= 2008 Market Rasen earthquake =

2008 earthquake epicentred in Market Rasen, Lincolnshire

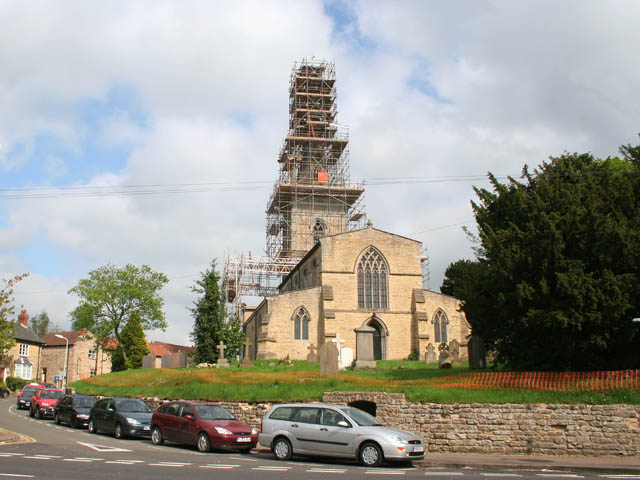
- Scaffolding covering the spire of the village church in Waltham on the Wolds after the earthquake

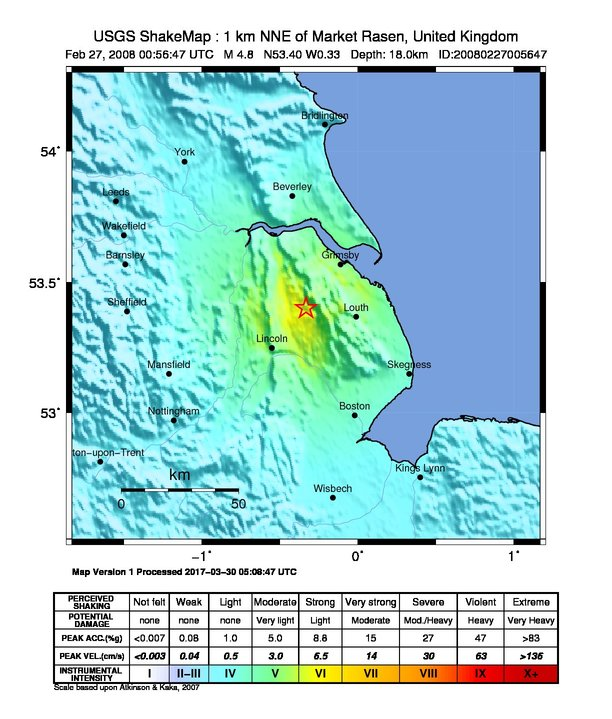
- Map showing epicentre (star) and shaking intensity
- UTC time: 2008-02-27 00:56:47
- ISC event: 13214978
- USGS-ANSS: ComCat
- Local date: 27 February 2008
- Local time: 00:56
- Magnitude: 5.2 M_{L} 4.8 mb
- Depth: 18.6 kilometres (12 mi)
- Epicentre: 53.404°N 0.331°W
- Areas affected: United Kingdom
- Total damage: £30 million (2008 GBP) (Note: Equivalent to £50 million ($65 million USD) in 2025)
- Max. intensity: EMS-98 VI (Slightly damaging)
- Casualties: One injured

On 27 February 2008 at 00:56:47.8s GMT an earthquake occurred at Market Rasen, Lincolnshire, England. According to the British Geological Survey the earthquake registered a reading of 5.2 on the Richter scale, with its epicentre 2.5 miles (4 km) north of Market Rasen and 15 kilometres (9 mi) south-west of Grimsby.

The duration of the earthquake was confirmed as roughly 10 seconds.

== Spread of effect ==
The tremors were felt across a wide area of England and Wales, from Hampshire in the south to Newcastle upon Tyne in the north, and as far west as Bangor, Northern Ireland. They were also reported in the Netherlands, Belgium, and the far north of France. Structural damage was recorded in some areas, including one case where a chimney collapsed and injured a person in Wombwell, South Yorkshire.

== Cause ==
The earthquake was caused by the sudden rupture and motion along a strike-slip fault, 18.6 kilometres (12 mi) beneath Lincolnshire. Earthquake motion occurred over a time span of ~2 minutes but it was most intense and was felt at the surface for just 10 to 30 seconds; maximum vertical ground motion at the epicentre of the earthquake was only ~1 mm. The observed focal mechanism implies either sinistral motion on a N–S or dextral motion on an E–W oriented strike-slip fault. The nine aftershocks observed, ~5 kilometres (3 mi) SSW of the main earthquake event, point to an approximately N–S oriented fault. From the 5.2 M_{L} magnitude of the main earthquake, a motion of a few centimetres along a ~2.5-kilometre-long (1.6 mi) fault rupture is derived. The energy released was 3.98 trillion joules (equal to the detonation of ~950 tonnes of TNT).

Unlike typical earthquakes worldwide, the earthquakes of Northern Europe are intraplate earthquakes, meaning they are not close to tectonic plate boundaries. Most intraplate earthquakes in northern Europe, including the British Isles, are thought to be driven by distant tectonic stresses—a combination of E–W North Atlantic Ridge and N–S African plate regional stress fields, and local mantle conditions. Indeed, the motion on the strike-slip fault responsible for the earthquake is compatible with a local NW–SE stress field; a product of the E–W and N–S regional stress fields.

Only a minority of earthquakes in the UK are related to post-glacial rebound e.g. the minor earthquakes (<3.5 M_{L}) of western Scotland, where glaciers ~1 km thick existed during the peak of the last ice age.

== Effects ==
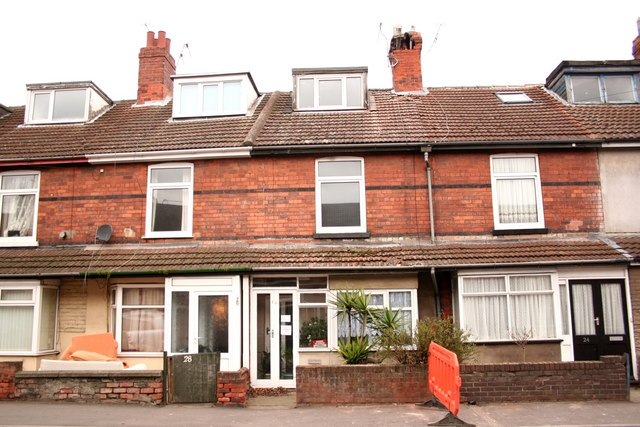
Collapsed chimneys were the primary damage reported across the earthquake area, as seen here in Gainsborough.

The earthquake resulted in structural damage to many homes and businesses in the epicentral area. Buildings as large as apartment blocks were reported to have shaken for up to 30 seconds afterwards. Birds and pets became highly agitated. There were no deaths, but a 19-year-old man in Wombwell, South Yorkshire suffered a broken pelvis when a piece of chimney fell through the roof onto his attic bed. The earthquake was felt by people as far south as Bournemouth, where it was felt as a mild but noticeable vibration, and as far away as Bangor, Northern Ireland, where it woke people.

Police in the Midlands received more than 5,000 telephone calls in an hour from members of the public regarding the earthquake. The earthquake caused power cuts in some areas. A church in March, Cambridgeshire reported that, since the earthquake, water had been coming up from the ground into the cellar at a rate of 10 imperial gallons (45 L) per hour. The spire of St Mary Magdalene church at Waltham on the Wolds in Leicestershire was damaged and was to be rebuilt at a cost of £100,000. Also damaged were the spires of St Andrew's Church in Haconby, St Andrew's Church in Witham on the Hill and St Vincent's Church in Caythorpe, all three in South Kesteven.

The cost of insurance payouts was estimated to be around £30 million, with the majority of damage being done to chimneys, roof tiles and by falling masonry.

=== Magnitude ===
The tremor was the largest earthquake to affect the UK since the 1984 Llŷn Peninsula earthquake, which measured 5.4 on the Richter scale. The British Geological Survey gave the earthquake a reading of 5.2 M_{L}, while the United States Geological Survey reported it measured 4.8 M_{b}. The French Atomic Energy Commission estimated the magnitude was 5.4 M_{L}.

=== Aftershocks ===
A total of nine aftershocks were recorded. The largest, measuring 2.8 on the Richter scale, occurred around five weeks after the initial event, on 5 April at 13:57 GMT.

== Responses ==
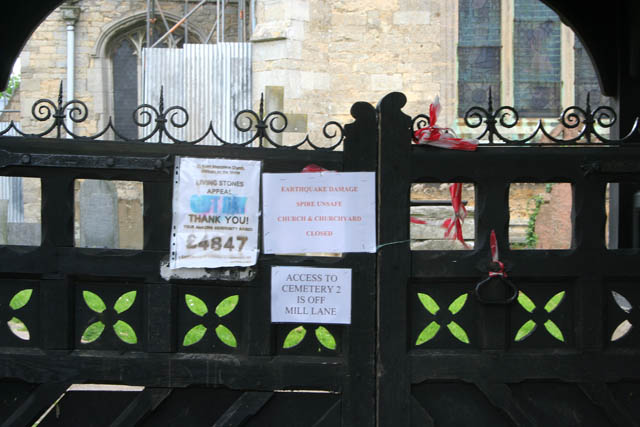
Many churches were damaged by the earthquake and temporarily closed.

Firefighting crews were called out to 50 incidents and one fire as a result of the quake. Building Control & Street Force officers worked quickly to assess damage in the area around West Lindsey, and West Lindsey District Council also urged people to call their telephone number if people were concerned about damage to their homes. Trent Street in Gainsborough was closed to traffic whilst a local builder assessed if properties were structurally safe, after 1 family was evacuated from their house following concerns about collapses.

== Significance ==
The BGS described the earthquake as an "extremely large earthquake in UK terms but not large in world terms". Approximately 200 earthquakes occur in the UK every year, approximately 175 of which are too weak to be noticed by humans.

== See also ==
- Geography of the United Kingdom
- List of earthquakes in 2008
- List of earthquakes in the British Isles
- London–Brabant Massif
