= 2007 Kent earthquake =

Earthquake in England

- Location within the United Kingdom
- UTC time: 2007-04-28 07:18:12
- ISC event: 11936179
- USGS-ANSS: ComCat
- Local date: April 28, 2007
- Local time: 8:18 am
- Magnitude: 4.3 M_{L}
- Depth: 5.3 kilometres (3 mi)
- Epicentre: 51.10°N 1.17°E
- Areas affected: Kent, England
- Max. intensity: EMS-98 VI (Slightly damaging)
- Casualties: 2 (minor injury)

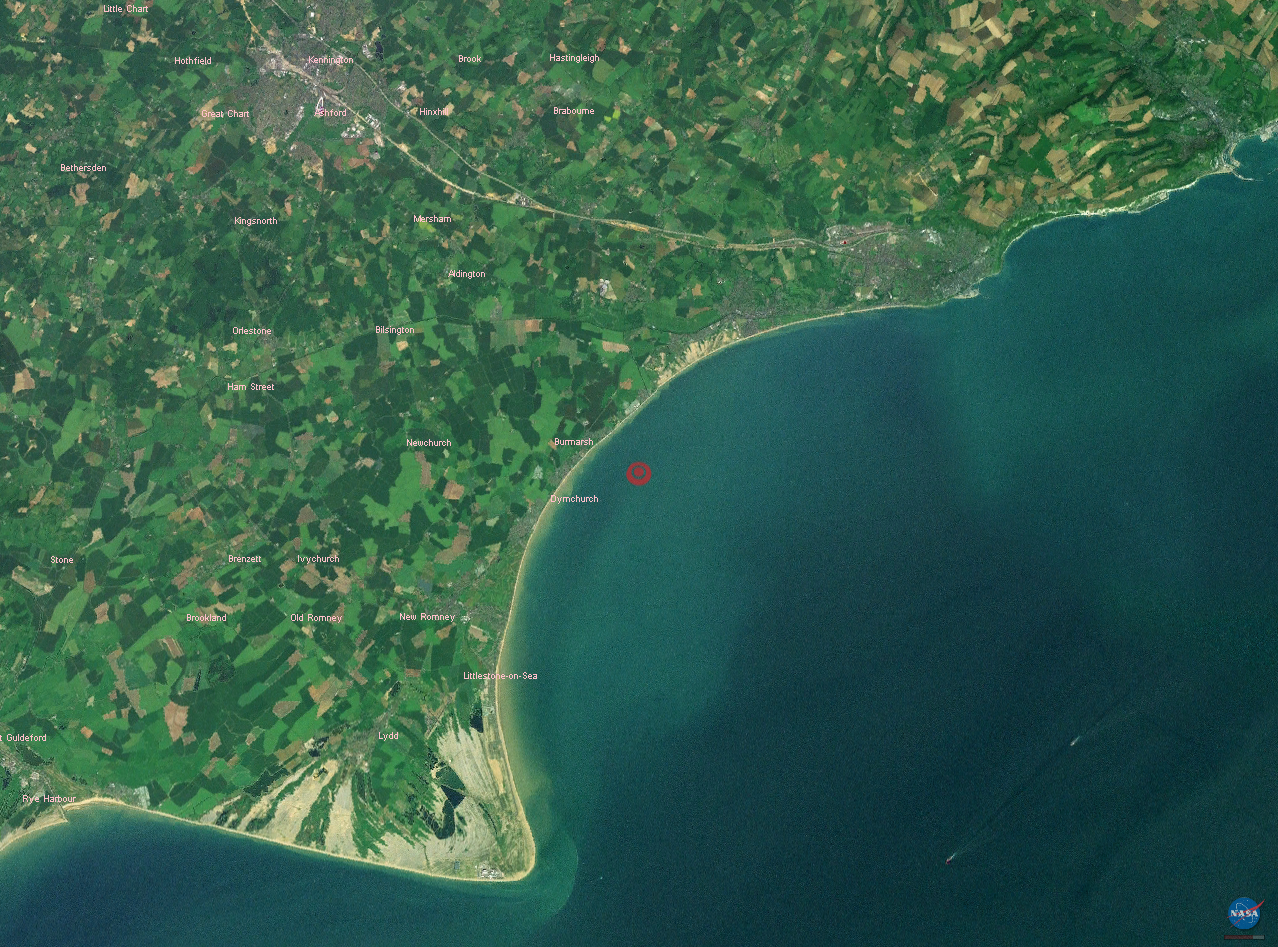
Landsat image of the earthquake's epicentre, based on USGS location data which was later revised.

The 2007 Kent earthquake registered 4.3 on the Richter scale and struck south east Kent, South East England on 28 April 2007 at 07:18:12 UTC (08:18:12 local time), at a shallow depth of 5.3 km.

The worst affected area was the town of Folkestone, although the towns of Deal, Dover and Ashford were also affected. The tremors could be felt across much of Kent and south east England, including as far as East Sussex, Essex and Suffolk, as well as on the other side of the English Channel at Calais and Brussels.

== Location ==
The British Geological Survey stated that the epicentre of the earthquake was less than 1 km north of Folkestone at 51.10°N, 1.17°E. The United States Geological Survey indicated that the location of the earthquake was at 51.085°N, 1.009°E suggesting a position approximately 5 km north west of Hythe.

== Impact ==
The earthquake's shallow depth and proximity to Folkestone resulted in structural damage in the town, and one woman suffered a minor head and neck injury. Following the earthquake, a total of 474 properties were reported as damaged, with 73 properties too badly damaged for people to return to, 94 seriously damaged, and 307 suffering from minor structural damage. Harvey Grammar School situated in Cheriton Road, Folkestone was closed on 30 April due to "significant structural damage".

Several thousand homes were left without power for several hours and there were reports of a "smell of gas" in Folkestone. The Port of Dover, the Channel Tunnel and travel links were unaffected, although authorities asked people heading towards Dover to use the A2.

EDF Energy had restored electricity supplies that had been cut by the earthquake by the same afternoon. The Salvation Army Church in Folkestone provided refuge on 28 April for approximately 100 people whose homes had been damaged by the earthquake.

On the same morning, a 300-metre (948 ft) long crack appeared in a cliff at Barton-on-Sea in Hampshire, creating fears of a landslide, although there were mixed views from authorities on whether it could be related to the earthquake.

== Magnitude ==
The British Geological Survey gave the earthquake a reading of 4.3 on the Richter scale, while the USGS and the European-Mediterranean Seismological Centre estimated that the earthquake had a body wave magnitude of 4.6 and 4.7 respectively.

It was the largest British earthquake since the 2002 Dudley earthquake and the strongest in the Dover Straits since a magnitude 4.4 earthquake in 1950. The strongest recorded British earthquake is the 1931 Dogger Bank earthquake, which measured 6.1 on the Richter scale.

Ten months later, the earthquake's strength was surpassed by that of the 2008 Lincolnshire earthquake, which was 5.2 in magnitude.

Less than two years later, on 3 March 2009 at 14.35 UTC, Folkestone was shaken by a smaller magnitude 3.0 quake, located in the same area.

== See also ==
- List of earthquakes in 2007
- List of earthquakes in the British Isles
- Dover Straits earthquake of 1580
- Geology of the United Kingdom
