= James Yates =

James or Jim Yates may refer to:

- James Yates (jurist), American attorney and jurist
- James Yates (minister) (1789–1871), English Unitarian minister and scholar
- James Yates (poet) (fl. 1582), English poet
- James Yates (cricketer) (1883–1929), English cricketer and British Indian Army officer
- Jamie Yates (born 1988), English footballer
- Jim Yates (bowls) (born 1934), former Australian lawn and indoor bowler and coach
- Jim Yates (politician), American politician in Kentucky
- James Yates (activist), African American anti-fascist
- Jimmy Yates (1869–1922), footballer
- The James Yates murders, a 1781 multiple homicide, the basis for the early American novel Wieland

== See also ==
- James Yeats (disambiguation)
