= St Vincent's Church, Caythorpe =

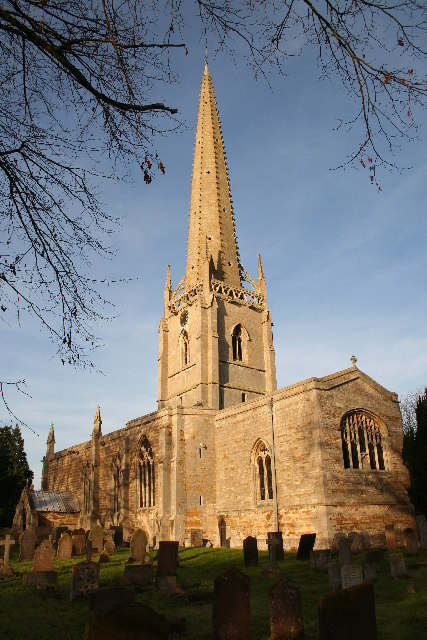
- Church of St Vincent, Caythorpe
- St Vincent's Church, Caythorpe
- 53.026155°N 0.60166365°W
- OS grid reference: SK 93894 48566
- Country: England
- Denomination: Church of England

History
- Founded: 13th century
- Dedication: Vincent of Saragossa

Architecture
- Heritage designation: Grade I
- Designated: 20 September 1966
- Architectural type: Decorated, Perpendicular

Specifications
- Materials: limestone, ironstone, rubble

Administration
- Province: Canterbury
- Diocese: Diocese of Lincoln
- Deanery: Deanery of Loveden
- Parish: Caythorpe

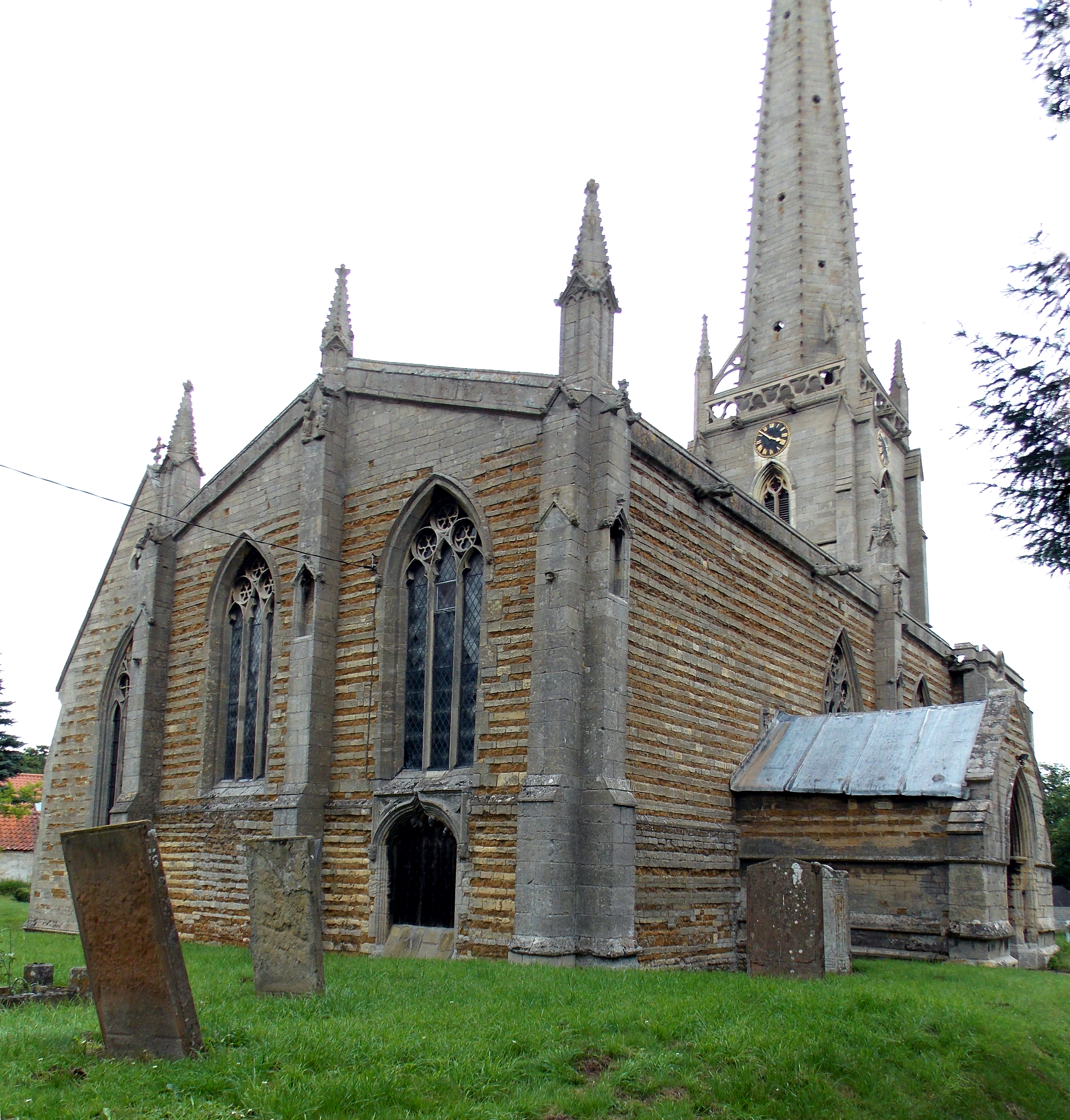
Nave from the south-west

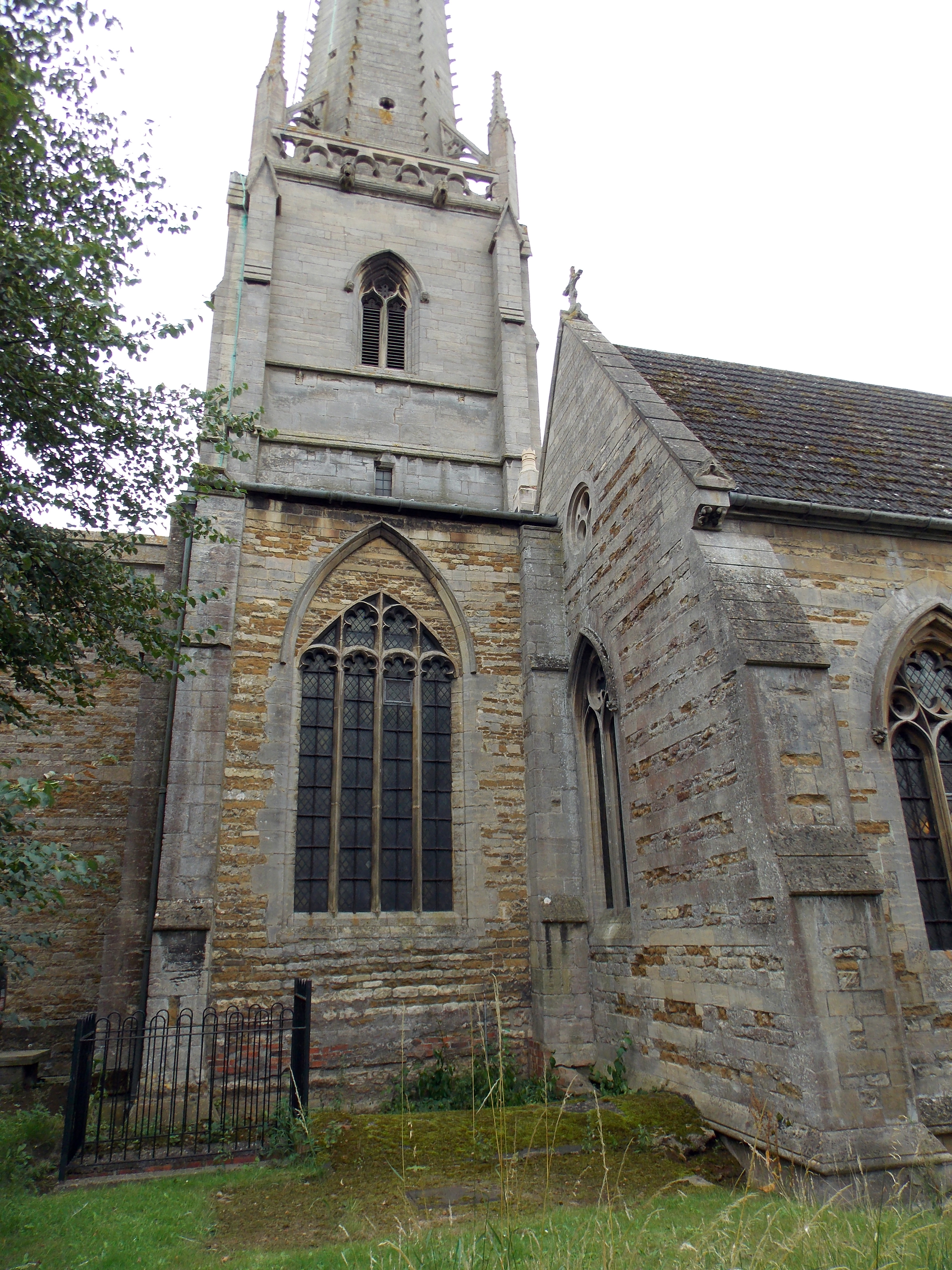
Church tower, north transept and north aisle from the north

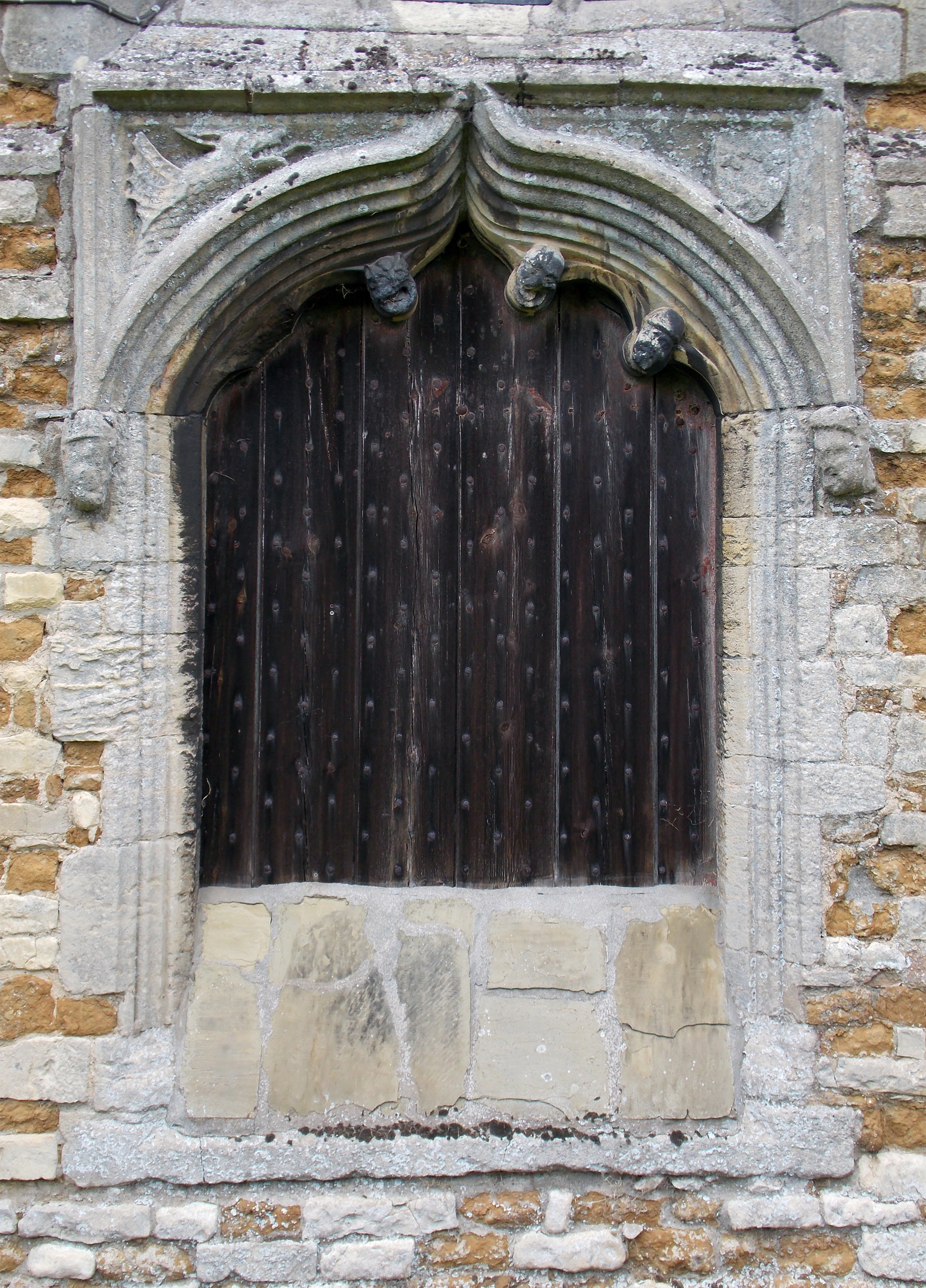
Blocked door in the west wall of the nave

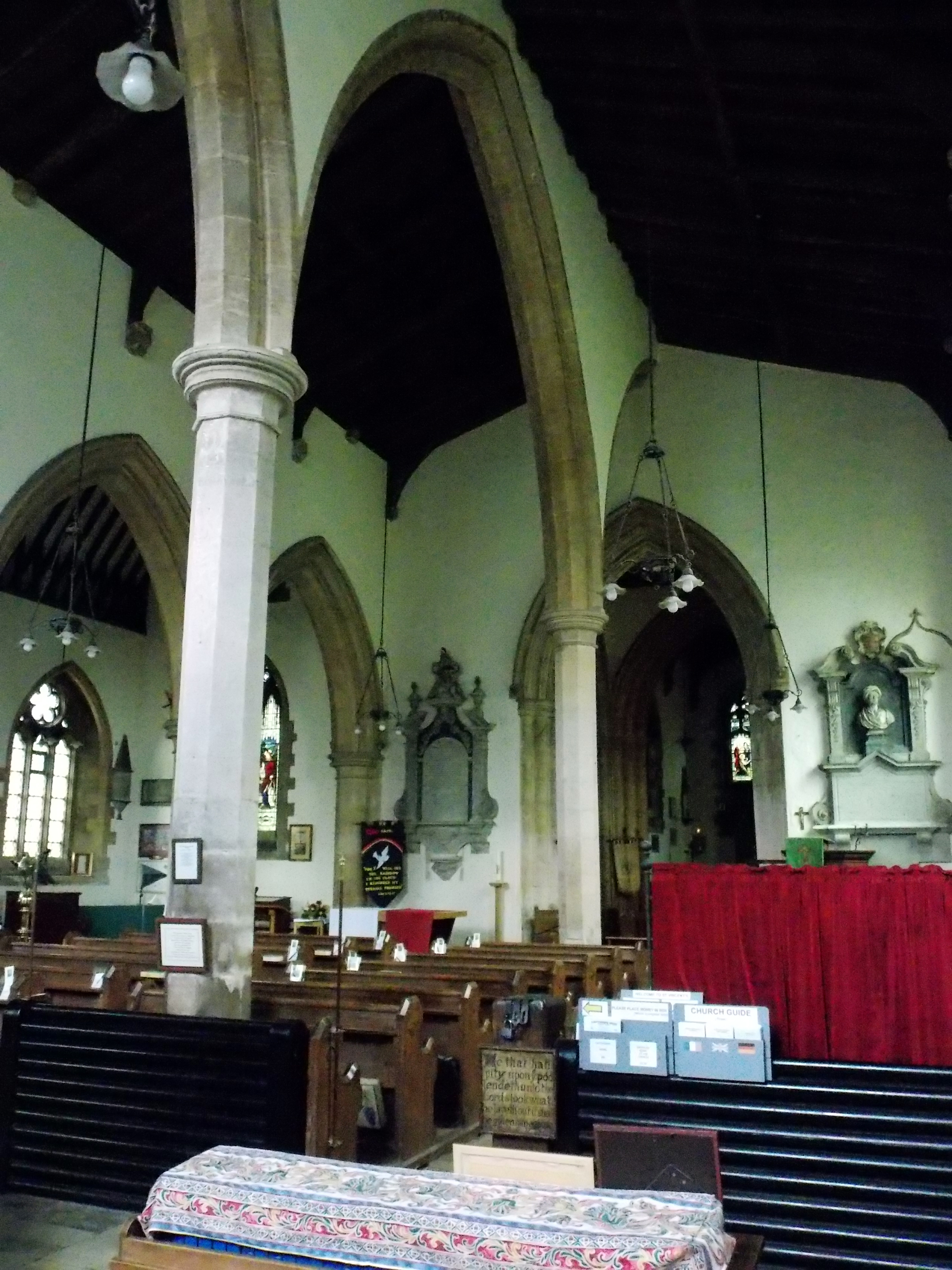
Nave from the south-west

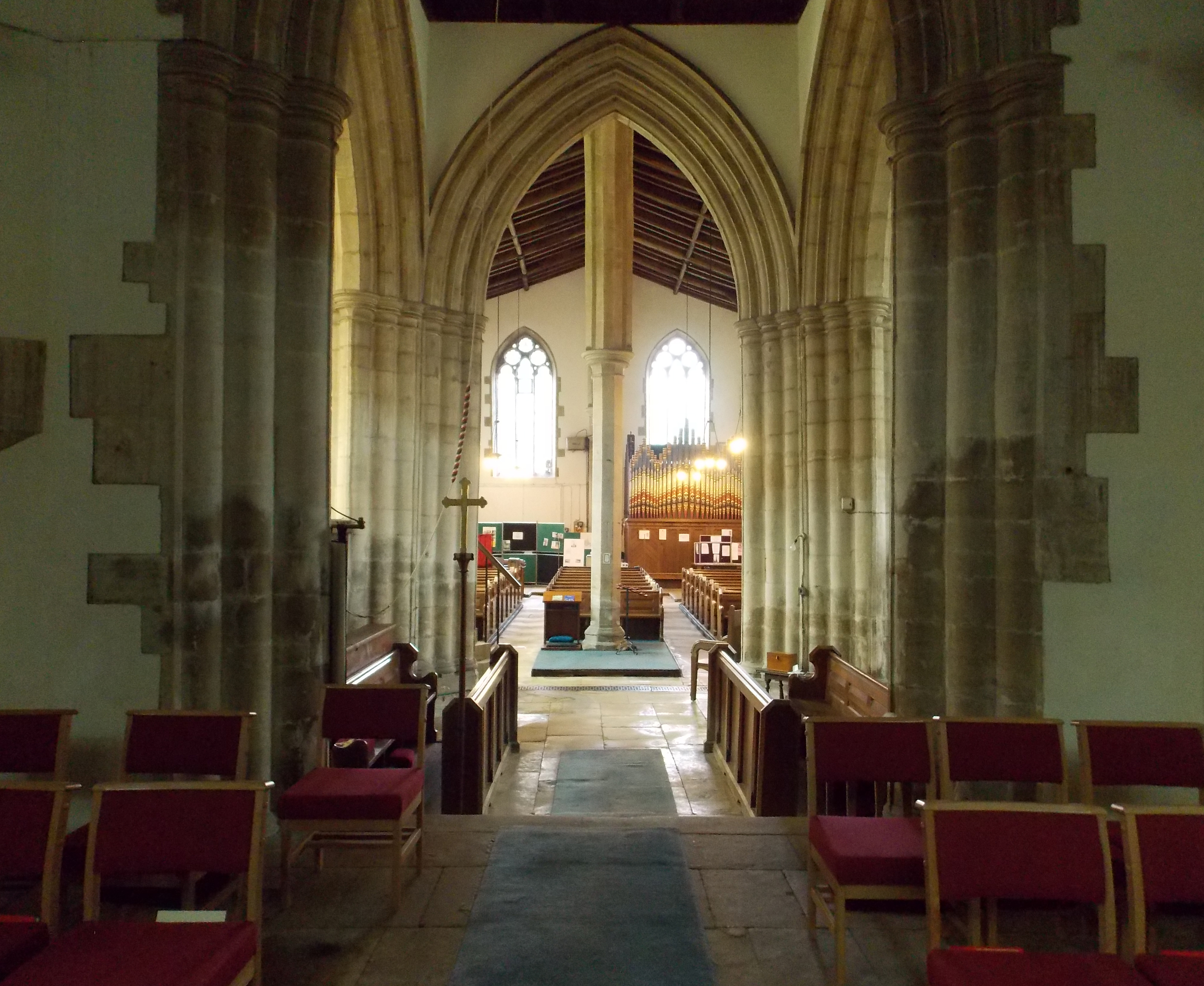
Chancel, crossing and nave from the east

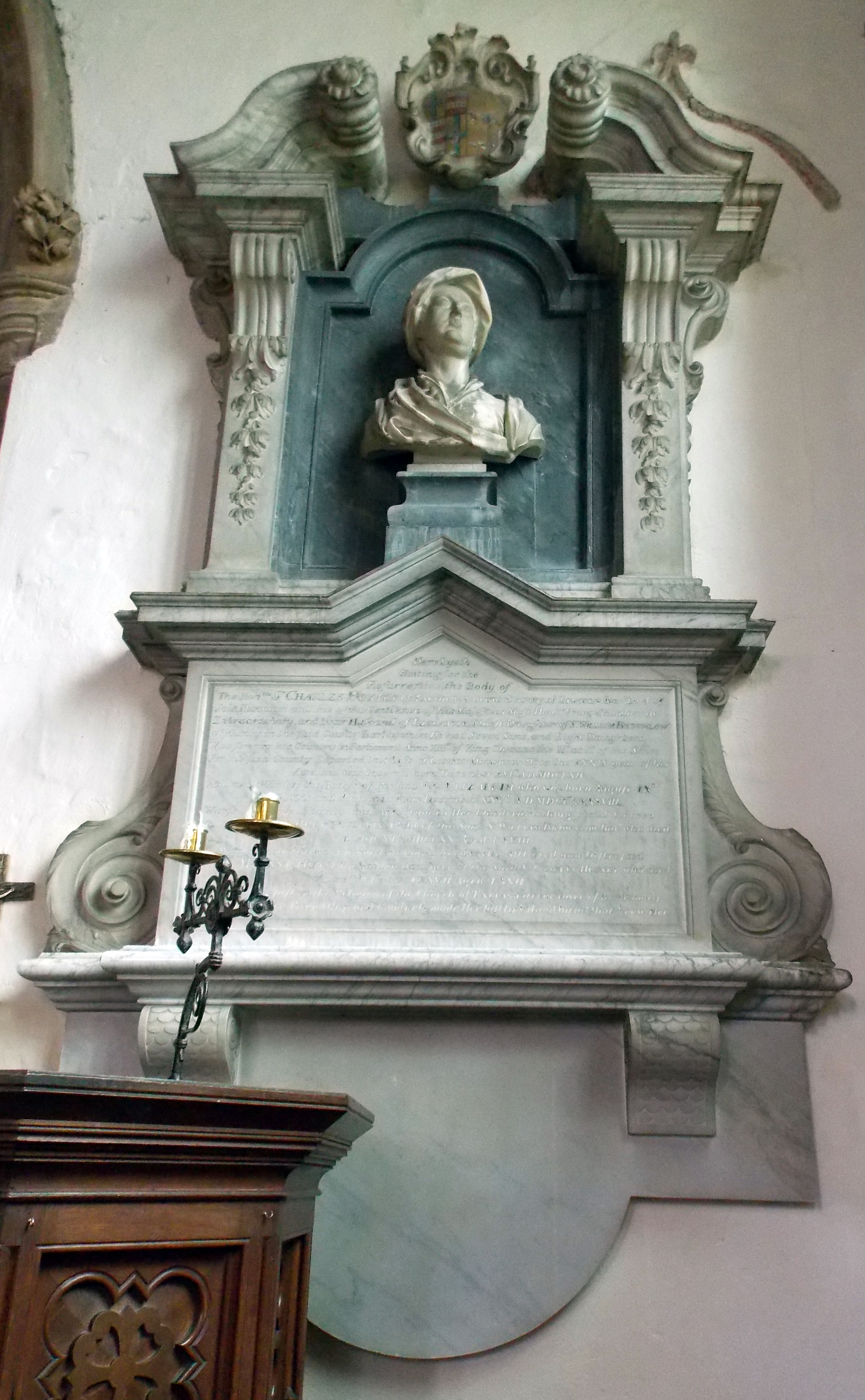
Memorial to Sir Charles Hussey

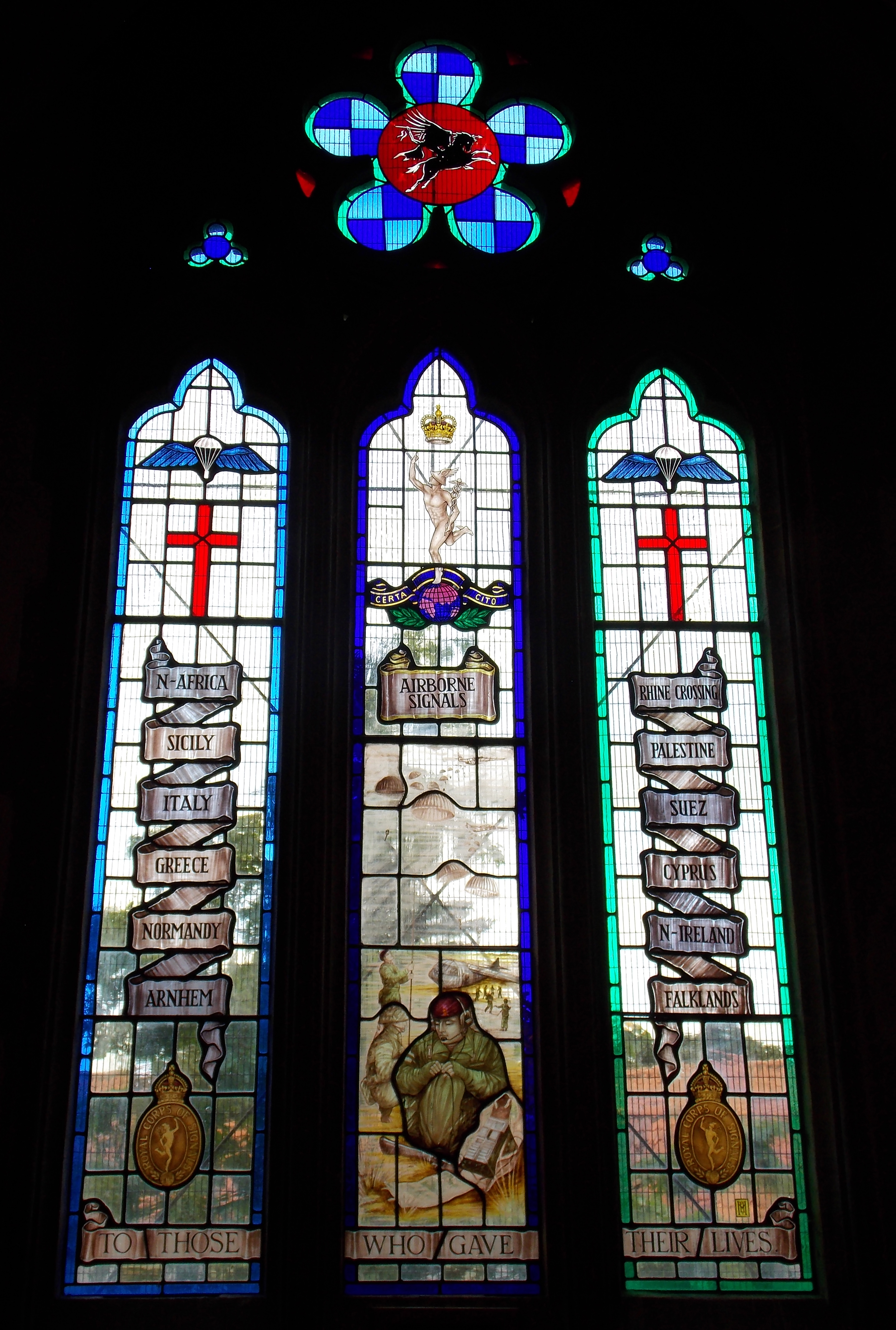
Stained glass window to the Airborne Signals

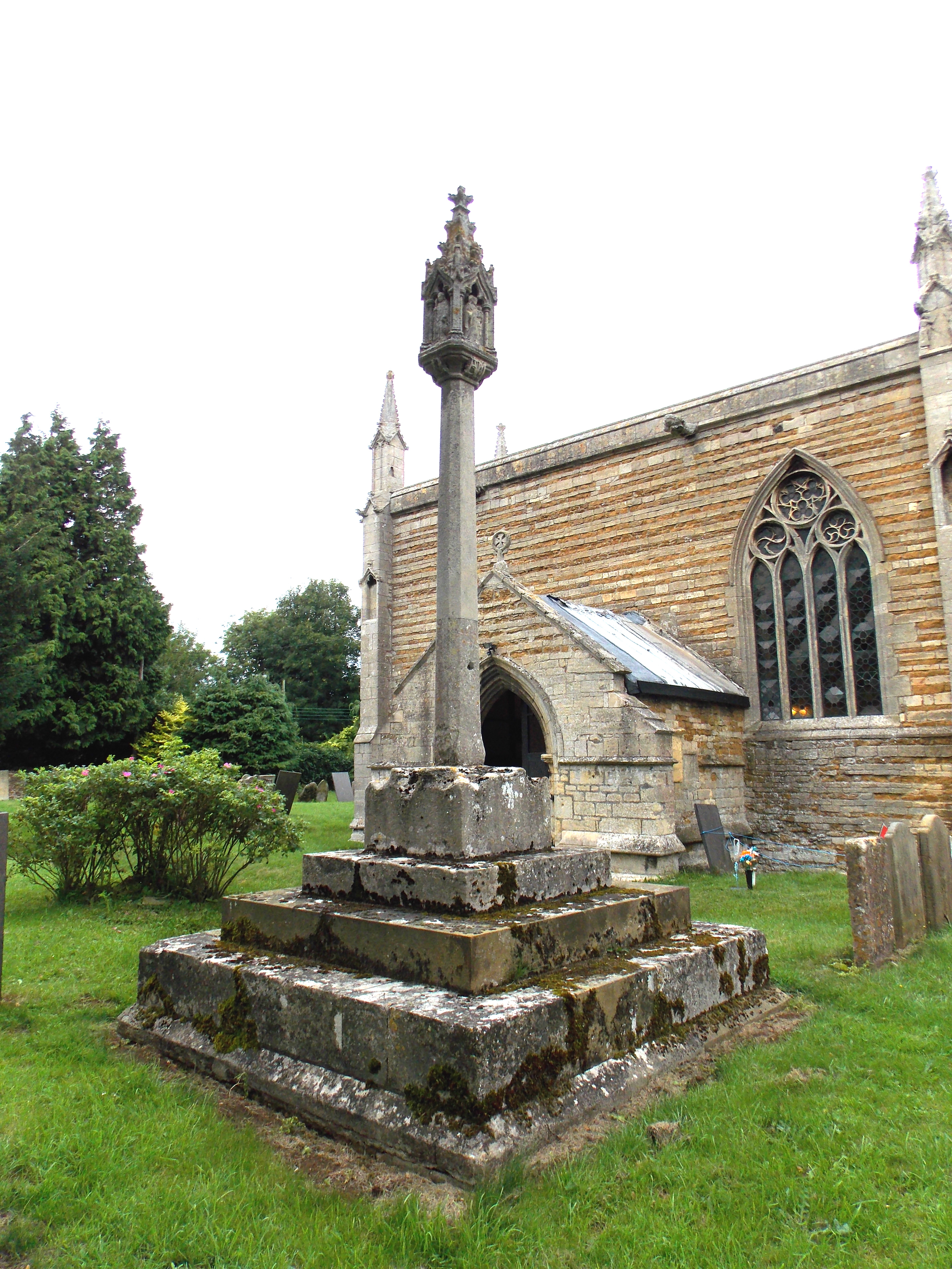
Cemetery cross from the south-east

St Vincent's Church is a Grade I listed Church of England parish church in Caythorpe, Lincolnshire, England. It is at the southern edge of the Lincoln Cliff in South Kesteven, and 10 miles (16 km) north from Grantham.

St Vincent's is only one of four churches in England dedicated to Vincent of Saragossa. The church is noted in particular for its double nave (one of only four existing in England), and monuments to Sir Charles and Sir Edward Hussey, and to the 18th-century astronomer Edmund Weaver.

The church is in the ecclesiastical parish of Caythorpe, and is one of the Caythorpe Group of churches in the Deanery of Loveden and the Diocese of Lincoln. Other churches within the group are St Nicholas' at Fulbeck, and St Nicholas' at Carlton Scroop with Normanton.

== History ==
There were two churches at Caythorpe in the 11th century, recorded in the 1086 Domesday Book. The present church building dates from the early, and chiefly completed before the middle of, the 14th century. The construction was probably sponsored by the niece of Edward II, Lady Elizabeth de Burgh who held the local lordship. The patronage of the present church at origin was held by the Knights Hospitaller, whose earlier Knights Templar had their Lincolnshire headquarters at Temple Bruer, 6 miles (10 km) to the north-east.

The parish register, which includes the adjoined hamlet of Frieston, dates from 1663 for baptisms; 1692 for marriages; and 1673 for burials. The earliest record of a Church of England rector at Caythorpe is of Christopher Mallam, parish priest in 1551. In 1842 the living was a rectory, valued in the Kings Books at £20. 11s. 10d., with 13 acres of glebe land, a residence, and a yearly modus—a payment in lieu of tithes—of £1,080. The incumbent was Rev’d George Woodcock, under the patronage of George Hussey Packe JP, Lord of the manor, principal landowner and High Sheriff of Lincolnshire. By 1855 the glebe acreage and modus had slightly increased, the incumbent being Rev'd Charles Daniel Crofts, BA, formerly of St John's College, Cambridge, rector until 1893. Between 1898 and 1938 the living, sponsored by Sir Edward Hussey Packe KBE, DL, JP, was held by Rev’d Frederick Markland Percy Sheriffs BA, formerly of Trinity College, Dublin, who was also the rural dean of Loveden.

On 30 December 1859 lightning struck the church spire causing the upper portion to fall through the roofs of the chancel and transepts. The spire was rebuilt in 1860 by George Gilbert Scott, the Gothic Revival architect. Its height, which was shortened by 10 feet (3.0 m), was compared by a contemporary Kelly's Directory as of a "general outline [that] is more graceful." At the same time a north aisle was added to the nave to a Scott design. Cox, in his 1916 publication Lincolnshire, described Scott’s new aisle as detrimental to the plan of the church, with Pevsner believing the nave "would be even more impressive if Scott had not added an outer aisle." The spire was again struck by lightning in 1937 with no damage caused to the structure.

Above and around the west arch of the transept crossing within the nave was previously the remains of ‘Doom’ mural paintings which included the Last Judgment and the Archangel Michael weighing souls. The paintings, damaged by weather during the 1859 lightning strike, were whitewashed over in the 1960s as restoration would have proved too expensive—only traces are visible, although the murals are capable of future recovery. An 1855 report described the paintings: "extending across the upper part of the west end of the nave is a beautiful fresco of the Last Judgment." By 1840 a gallery with seating for 150 had been built. Concurrent installations were a tower clock by E J Dent of The Strand, London, and a ring of eight "very fine bells" by Mears of Whitechapel, London, both presented to the parish by George Hussey Packe. These bells were recast in 1912 at a cost of £300. The eight bells are credited differently in Dove's Guide for Church Bell Ringers: being by George Oldfield (1639 and 1656), Thomas Eayre (1744), and John Taylor & Co (1913). John Taylor is also credited with a 1913 recasting.

In 1871 the church’s organ was supplied by Forster and Andrews of Hull, at a cost of £270. By the 1980s woodworm attack had necessitated a restoration, with only five ranks of the original pipes, diapason front pipes, and the organ casing remaining unaffected. The restoration was carried out by Henry Groves & Son of Nottingham in 1986, who amalgamated the original with a Gray and Davison organ from Christ Church Chilwell, and added a separate organ console within the north aisle. From the previous organ remained 456 pipes, to which were added a further 362. The refurbished organ was dedicated by the Bishop of Grantham.

In 1947 the 16th-century funerary armour of Baron Hussey, executed at Lincoln in 1538 (or 1536) for participation in the Pilgrimage of Grace, was donated to St Vincent’s by Sir Edward Hussey Packe KBE of Prestwold. In 1997 these artifacts and other valuables were stolen from the church and remain unrecovered. The brackets that held the armour are on the south wall of the chancel, although National Heritage continues to note the funerary armour as existing within the church.

St Vincent's received an English Heritage Grade I listing on 20 September 1966. In 2011 the church received £102,000 from the Heritage Lottery Fund towards the maintenance of the church spire and nave roof.

The church was closed temporarily in February 2012 after damage to the spire from the 2008 Lincolnshire earthquake was discovered.

Yearly memorial services for the No. 216 Parachute Signals Squadron have been hosted at St Vincent’s on the first Sunday in September. The Regiment was stationed at Caythorpe, and took part in the Second World War 1944 Operation Market Garden. Stained glass windows were installed in the north aisle in 1994, a memorial to the Airborne Signals (Royal Corps of Signals), and to those of its number who died in the 1982 Falklands War and other historic campaigns. In 2011 and 2012 the Band of the RAF Regiment Brass Ensemble gave concerts of jazz and military music within the church.

== Architecture ==
=== Exterior ===
St Vincent’s is a church of chiefly limestone rubble and ironstone fabrication, with ashlar details, and slate roofs. Of cruciform footprint, it comprises a chancel, double nave, tower with spire and belfry above a central crossing, north and south stub transepts, a north aisle, and a south porch. It dates in construction from the 13th to the 18th century, with 1860s additions and rebuilding, in mainly Early Decorated style, and Perpendicular.

The tower sits centrally at a crossing between the nave and chancel (west and east), and north and south stub transepts, and, with its crocketed spire, reaches a total height of 156 feet (47.5 m). The octagonal spire contains six small flush lucarnes each side in an alternating pattern, and is topped by a weathervane. The parapet above the belfry is a curvilinear open structure topped by a straight rail, and joins, at each corner, crocketed pinnacles attached to the spire by slender flying buttresses. The belfry stage is supported by two buttresses at each corner, and contains two clocks, one each on the south and west face, and a window on each side, each of two lancet lights topped with simple traceried openings, and edged by a hood mould arch—moulded arch projections against the wall—ornamented with label stops. The roof is drained through two grotesque gargoyles on each side, set between the base of the parapet and the belfry stage.

The nave, as with the chancel and north aisle, shows a banding construction from the ground to eaves in alternate courses of ironstone and ashlar. On its west are gabled buttresses, two at each corner, and one at the centre running to the point of the ridge—a further buttress supports the south wall, and all are topped by pinnacles inset with arched panels below crocketed spires. A bas relief Annunciation is worked into the top of the central west buttress, and this, and south facing buttresses, contain gabled statue niches with trefoiled inset surrounds. Two Decorated late 13th-century windows are placed in the west wall, one either side of the central buttress. They are of three lancets, with pointed heads, geometrical tracery—typically circular rosette devices dating from c.1250–1310—and hood moulds. Below the west wall south window is a late 14th-century door, now blocked, within an ogee-headed stone surround. The spandrels between the ogee and outer rectilinear enclosure contain on one side a dragon motif, and on the other, a shield. Beneath and attached to the ogee head are three grotesque bosses—a probable fourth is missing—as stops to the foiled moulding. The nave south wall is surmounted by a plain parapet holding projecting gargoyles. It contains two windows, each of four lights—one Decorated, the other with Perpendicular tracery—and both with hood moulds. Two small 15th-century windows sit beneath the easterly window, one of two lights, the other single.

The chancel is probably largely the result of 18th- and 19th-century rebuilding. The east wall contains a five light 15th-century style stained glass window, and the south and north walls with a two-light window each, the north with geometrical tracery. In the south wall are the remains of a 13th-century priest’s doorway with a trefoil head.

During Scott’s 1860 additions, what is now the north aisle west window of four lancets, contemporary with the 13th-century geometrical nave west windows, was re-sited from the original north wall of the nave. The aisle also contains Scott’s run of four windows on its long north side, all of three lancets with cinquefoils—lobes formed by the overlapping of five circles—set in a rosette above within a pointed head, and at the east one window of two lancets with a quatrefoil rosette above. Above the aisle east and west windows are small glazed trefoil openings. Between the north wall windows, and at the aisle corners, are buttresses with steeply angled double steps to the eaves of the slate roof, with their socles, or base plinths, continuing around the faces of the aisle walls.

The north stub of the earlier late 13th-century transept contains a 15th-century Perpendicular window, with four lights divided by slender mullions ending in flat curved arches with trefoils, the centre two lights extending above to a pointed arch. The line of the previous 13th-century north transept is defined by a pointed relief moulding above. The south stub transept window is Early English, incorporating four lancet lights with three quatrefoil rosettes above.

The 14th-century south porch is of the same banded limestone and ironstone, and set on an ashlar plinth. Its pointed and moulded arched entrance is supported by octagonal pillars. Remains of mass dials (sundials) are at the right of the entrance. The interior contains two stone benches, one each side. The nave door within the porch incorporates large elaborate wrought iron hinges, and is set within a moulded cusped (lobed) door surround. Above the surround is a gabled and crocketed relief moulding, within which sits a figure of the Virgin Mary. The entrance and the gabled relief are bordered left and right by buttresses, topped by pinnacles truncated by the roof. A grant to St Vincent’s from the Incorporated Church Building Society (established 1818), later managed by the Historic Churches Preservation Trust and today the National Churches Trust, is noted in an inscription in the porch: "The Incorporated Society for Building for Churches grant £1,100 towards enlarging this Church upon condition that 282 seats numbered… to… be reserved for use of the poorer inhabitants of this parish".

=== Interior ===
The major architectural feature of St Vincent’s is its nave, with Pevsner reporting the building as "one of the rare two-naved churches;" it being one of only four such in England. A two-and-a-half-bay arcade supported by three octagonal piers runs through the centre of the nave and rises to the roof ridge. It begins at the west wall and ends with a half arch meeting the west arch of the central crossing. The chief timbers of the nave, with its corbels at the south, are probably 14th-century. A 17th-century poor box is at the west of the nave. The unadorned "chalice shaped" Decorated hexagonal baptismal font is, according to Caythorpe Parish Council, 600 years old, but according to English Heritage is 19th-century.

Separating the nave from the 19th-century north aisle is a further arcade—part of the Scott rebuilding—with similar octagonal piers to the nave arcade, but with added hood moulds, and foliate label stops that English Heritage describes as "incongruously decorated Southwell-style." The north aisle, now also known as The Arnhem Aisle, contains a series of stained glass windows to the Royal Corps of Signals, while the east stained window is a 1902 dedication to George Henry Minnit, died 1900 at Frieston.

Between the nave and the chancel is a four-arch crossing which runs under the tower, with shallow transepts to the north and south. The arches are of 13th-century Decorative period and style. The piers are composed of five columns each with circular rolled capitals. The arches are moulded and pointed, with the nave arch bordered by a hood mould with label stops. There are mason marks on both nave-side pillars. To the south of the west crossing arch at the east of the nave, above and behind the Sir Charles Hussey monument, is a blocked entrance for a previous rood screen loft, indicated by an ogee head moulding. The south transept contains the church sacristy, with the north transept a chapel dedicated to the Blessed Virgin Mary. Windows in both transepts are clear glazed. Both transepts contain aumbries, with the north, a wall statue bracket. Blocked rood loft access openings also exist at both east and west sides of the south transept. Both transepts have previously been used as chapels.

The chancel contains 19th-century stained glass: the north window depicts Mary Magdalene and the risen Christ, and that at the south, two images of Christ, one holding a lantern, the other a lamb. This latter window is a memorial to the Rev’d Edward Thomas Lewis, rector from 1893 to 1898. The 19th-century five-light east stained window of 15th-century style sits behind a reredos and altar that were donated to the church in 1893. This, and the north stained glass window are memorials to the Rev’d Charles Daniel Crofts, rector from 1847 to 1893, and his wife. The central light of the east window portrays Christ, with prophets and apostles in lights to the north, and martyrs and bishops and an abbess in those to the south—one bishop is possibly Edward King.

Church plate comprises a 1732 paten and flagon by Thomas Tearle, and a 1569 silver chalice by John Morley, with a 1675 cover. Morley was possibly a silversmith from Osbournby.

== Memorials ==
Significant memorials are those to the Hussey baronets: Sir Charles (1626–1664), and his wife Elizabeth; and Sir Edward (c. 1661–1725), and his wife Elizabeth (died 1750). Both memorials are at the east wall of the nave. Sir Charles’s, immediately to the south of the crossing arch, is of a bust set between columns with hanging foliate relief below brackets, these supporting a broken and scrolled pediment with a decorative scrolled cartouche bearing coat of arms at its centre. Below, and part of the monument, is a plaque with inscriptions beneath a pediment and inside vertical volutes. The monument is ascribed to W. Palmer, and Pevsner gives its date as c. 1730. Sir Edward’s, to the north of the crossing arch, comprises a plaque inscription between pilasters on which is set a pediment broken into three sections topped with an urn on each side. A split garland above the plaque leads to a putto head beneath the central section of the pediment, upon which is a painted coat of arms surrounded by scrolled relief decoration. All parts of both memorials are marble.

Sir Edward was the second son of Sir Charles, MP for Lincolnshire in 1656, and between 1661 and 1664, and one of the Gentlemen of the Privy Chamber to Charles II. Sir Edward was MP for Lincoln between 1689 and 1702. The Hussey family were patrons of the church and its benefice.

A chancel memorial—in the shape of a tombstone, with putto head, scrolling, and foliate devices below a pediment—is that to Edmund Weaver of Frieston (1683–1748), the astronomer, local land surveyor, and author of The British Telescope ephemerides.

Plaques on the north aisle north wall are to those of the parish killed in the First and Second World Wars, and to those of the 1st Airborne Signals who fought in 1942–45 campaigns in Italy and North Africa. A further plaque describes the dedication of the north aisle to "the memory of the men of the First Airborne Divisional Signals who were billeted in the Parish and neighbourhood before flying to Holland [sic] in their valiant attempt to establish a bridgehead over the River Rhine at Arnhem. September 17th 1944."

Further memorials in the nave and chancel include plaques to Rebecca Atkin (1817); Thomas Hacket (1834), Lincoln County Hospital surgeon; Richard and Ann Metheringham (1785 and 1789); William, Catherine and Rebecca Pickworth; Mary Ann Smith (1806); Edward Smith (1799) and his son Edward aged six (1784); Parker Smith (1859), land agent and auctioneer, Mary Smith (1857) and Ann Hacket (1860); Infants Emily Ann (1828) and Ann Elizabeth (1825) Woodcock; Anna Elizabeth Woodcock (1834); Arthur Jesse Ison (1958), rector; George Woodcock MA (1844), rector; and Emma (1861) and Sarah (1863) Benworthy, last daughter of George Woodcock, rector. Monuments include those to William Shield (1812), Sophia Shield (1811), and Henrietta, an infant; William, Catherine and Rebecca Pickworth; Mary, Judith and Elizabeth Holmes; Thomas Dawson, Gent... (1729), and Pickworth B P Horton (1812), who died at the Battle of Salamanca.

== Churchyard ==
Within the churchyard to the south of the church is a 14th-century ashlar cross with tapering shaft. A gabled lantern was added in 1906 in 14th-century style, with Pevsner describing the cross as "with a square base with scooped-out top corners and part of the shaft." The cross, Grade II listed and a scheduled monument, might be a previous village market cross.

Immediately outside the church gates, at the south-west of the church, is the village war memorial. To the right of the war memorial, and set into the outer side of the churchyard wall, is a plaque in commemoration to those of the Airborne Signals killed in Operation Corporate in the 1982 Falklands War. The plaque was brought from Aldershot Barracks in 2000 following the formation of the 16 Air Assault Brigade. Adjacent is a boulder, brought from the Falkland Islands, on which is a plaque dedicated to two members of the Parachute Signals also killed during the Falklands War.

== Rectors ==
Taken from the St Vincent listings plaque, and the Clergy of the Church of England database.

- 1221 – Benedict
- 1250 – Alexander de Aldriseo
- 12?? – John de Sodington
- 1287 – Robert de Waldegrave
- 1291 – Brian de Podio
- 13?? – William ...
- 1349 – John de Hertford
- 1361 – Richard Keper
- 1381 – Thomas Whiston
- 1381 – Simon Helgeye
- 1391 – John Newton
- 1393 – John Launce
- 1395 – Robert Northelode
- 1396 – John Dyne
- 1397 – William Palmer
- 1399 – John Bulwyk
- 1402 – Robert Langton
- 14?? – Thomas ...
- 1410 – Edward Lyttyl
- 1412 – John de Waterden
- 1415 – Richard Manton
- 1419 – Simon Melburne
- 1423 – William Fallar
- 142? – Robert al Vickers
- 1429 – Robert Trewluffe
- 1435 – William Bedall
- 14?? – John Newton
- 1462 – Robert Cokke
- 1492 – John Walkewode
- 1506 – Edmund Wilkinson
- 15?? – William ...
- 1511 – John Hall
- 15?? – Thomas Thornton
- 1528 – Christopher Malhonie

Secession and break with Rome (1534)

- 1551 – Christopher Mallam
- 1557 – John Salisbury
- 1558 – Francis Babington
- 1563 – Roger Barker
- 1585 – Francis Babington
- 1597 – Thomas Thorold MA
- 1635 – Edward Kidd BD
- 1641 – Charles Harrington

Interregnum

- 1651 – Ralph Tonstall

Restoration

- 1662 – Richard Tonstall
- 1662 – Ralph Tunstall
- 1715 – Thomas Hopkin AM
- 1744 – George Pochin MA
- 1788 – Henry Woodcock LLB
- 1826 – George Woodcock MA
- 1844 – Agustus Packe MA
- 1847 – Charles Daniel Crofts BA
- 1893 – Edward Thomas Lewis MA
- 1898 – Frederick M. P. Sheriffs BA
- 1938 – Arthur J. Ison BA
- 1960 – Jonathan E. Draper
- 1966 – Eric V. Inglesby MA
- 1971 – Francis Kennedy MA

United benefice with Fulbeck and Carlton Scroop

- 1983 – Hugh C. Middleton BTh
- 1996 – Brian H. Lucas CB
- ???? – Ali S. Healy

== Gallery ==
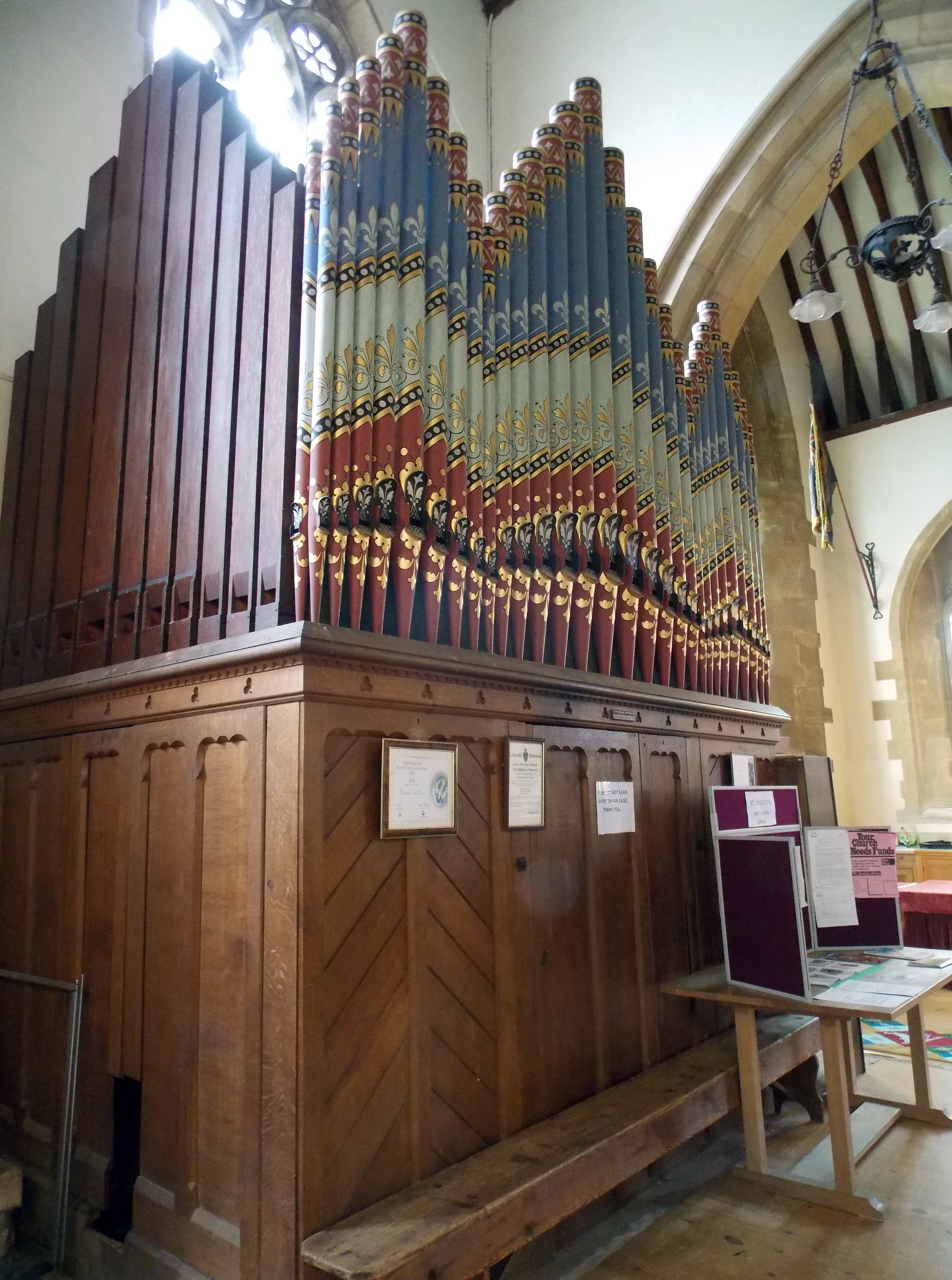
Church organ

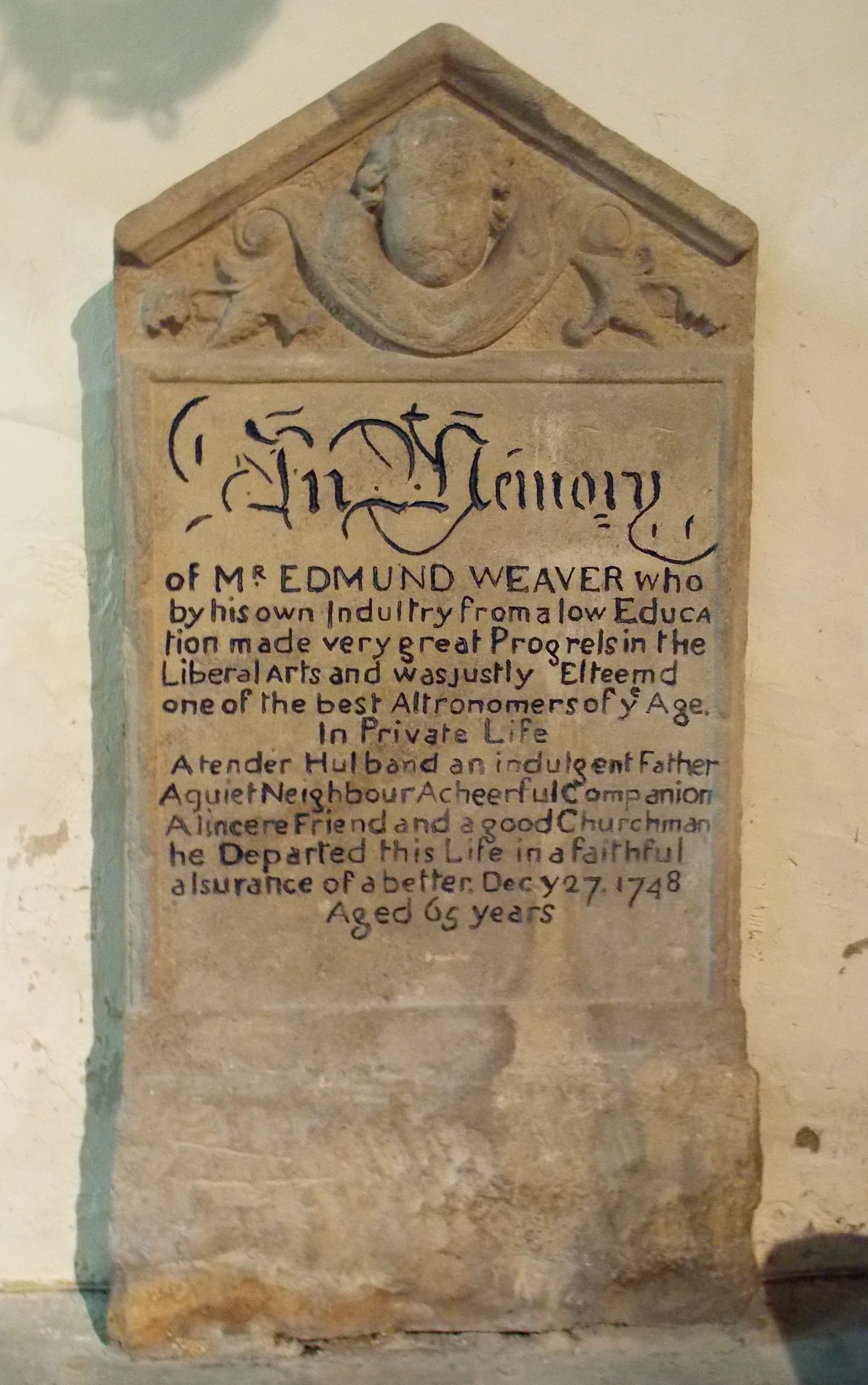
Chancel memorial to Edmund Weaver

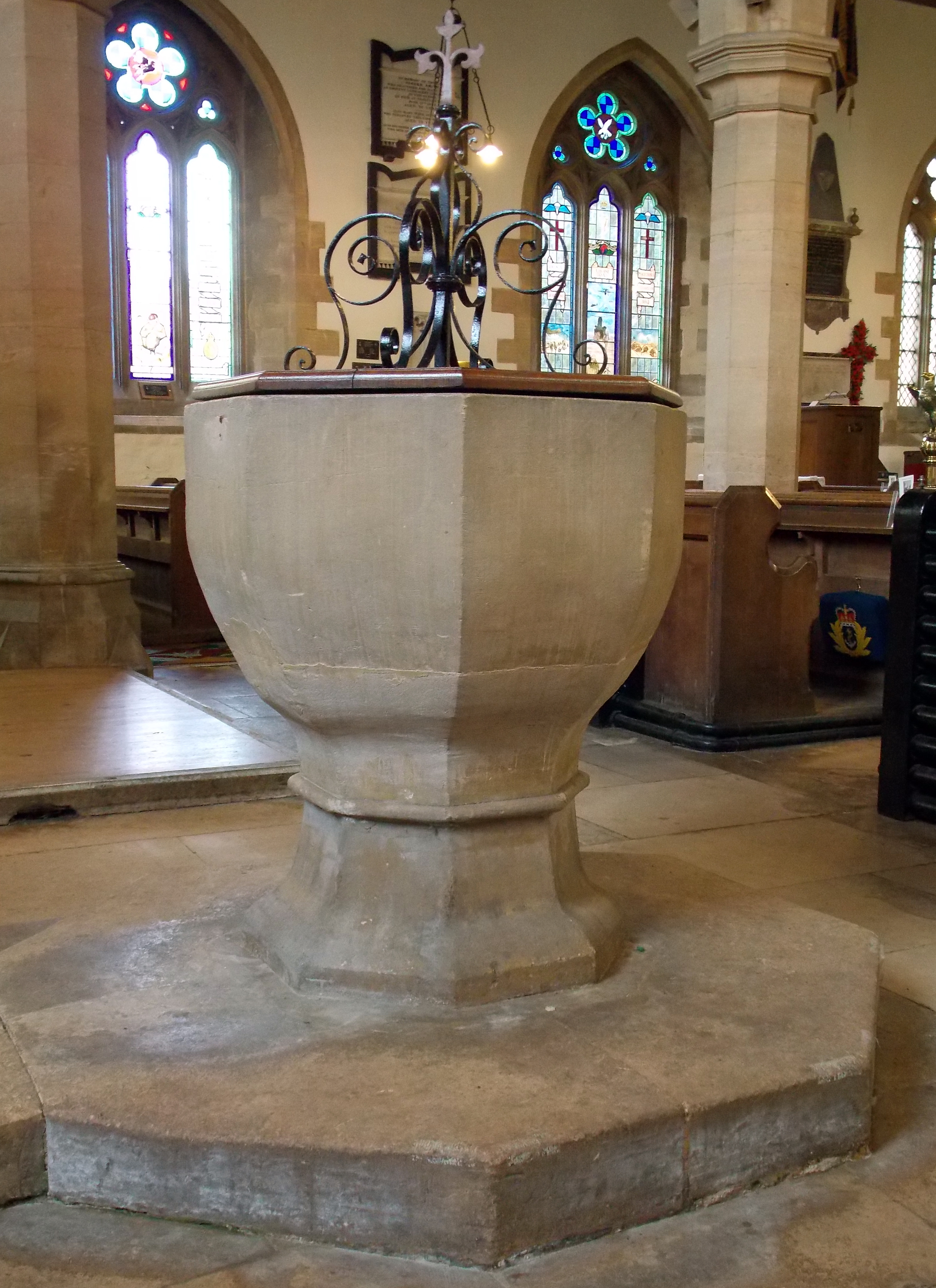
Baptismal font

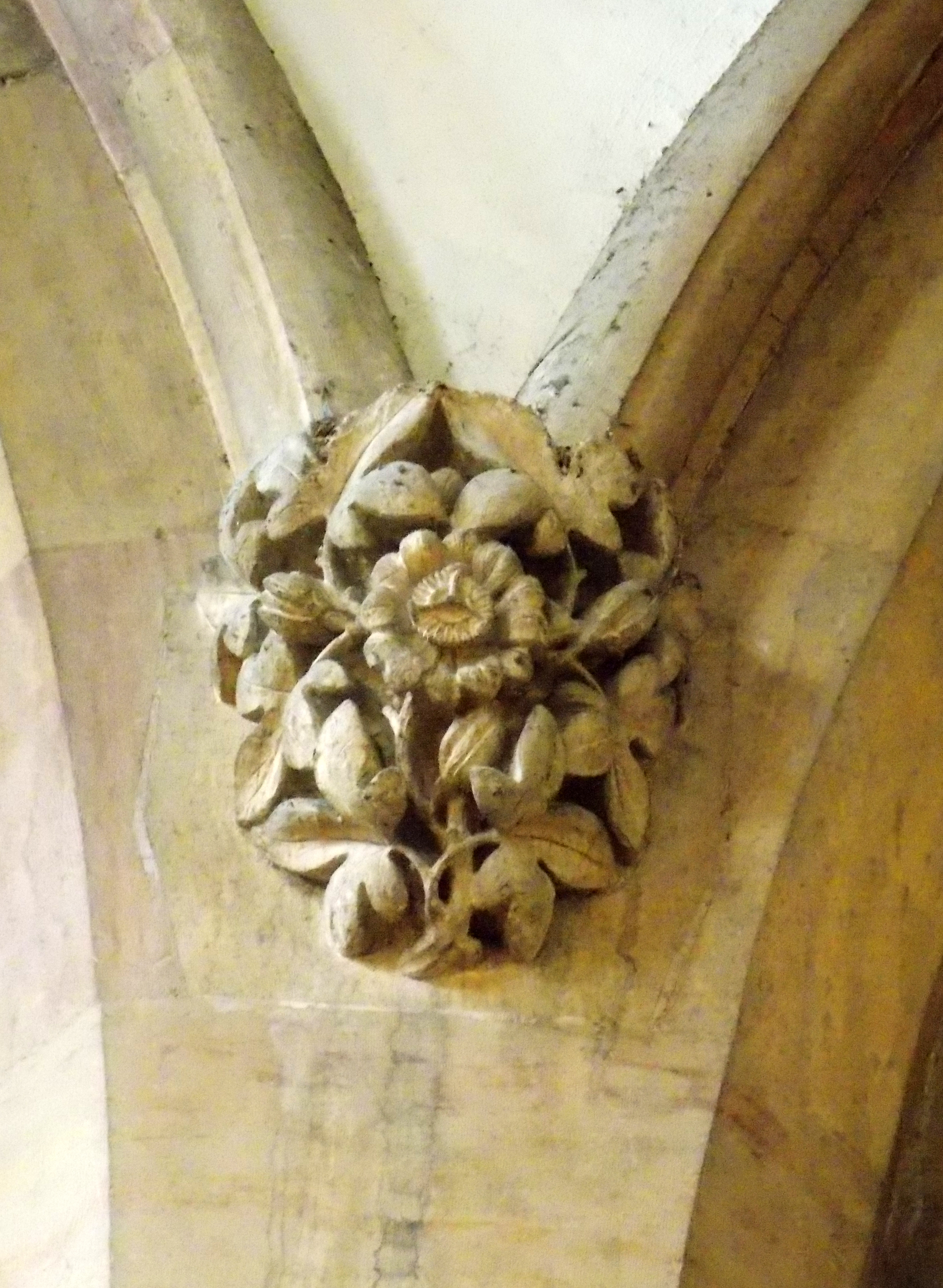
North arcade foliate stop

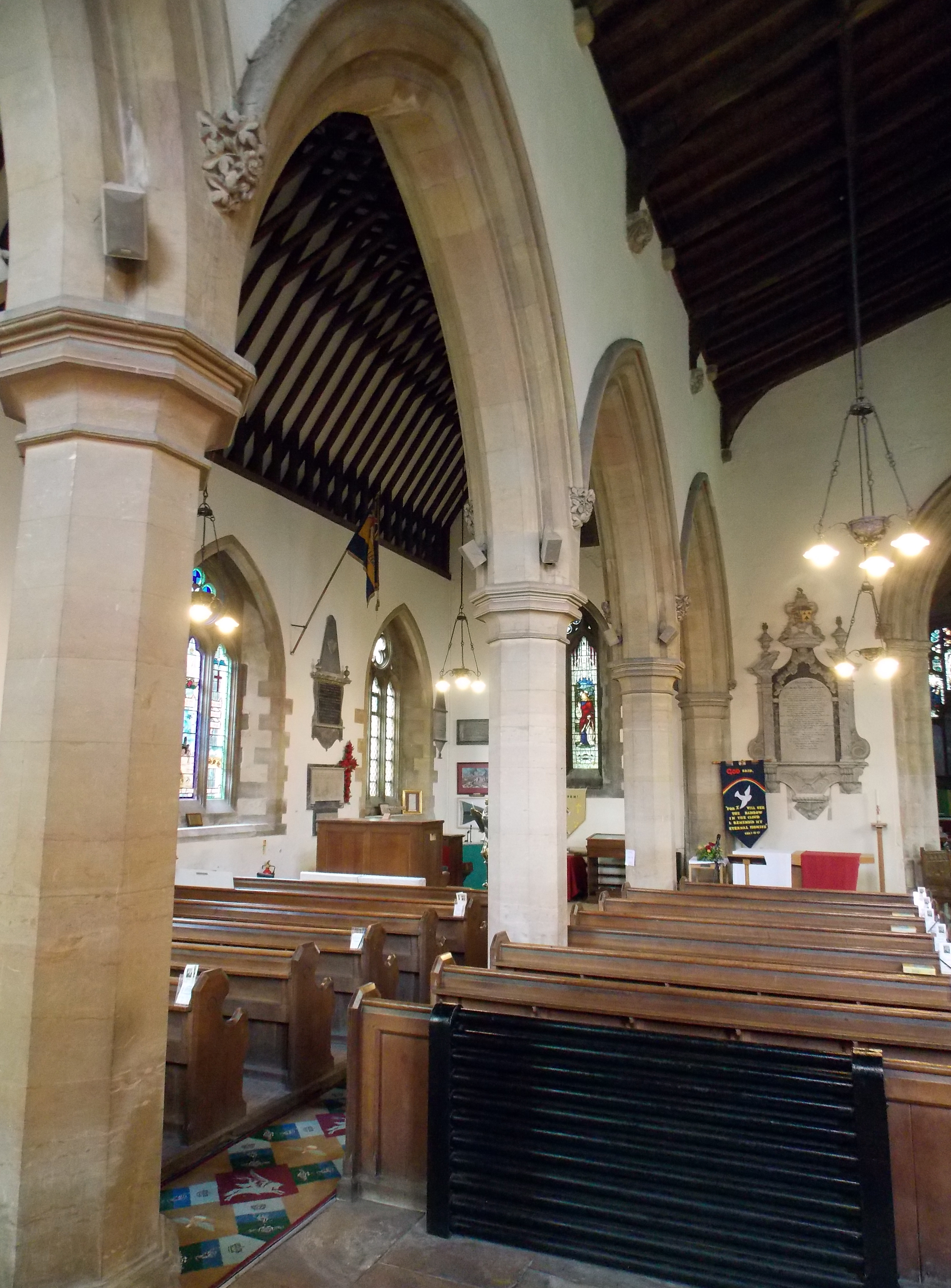
North arcade from nave

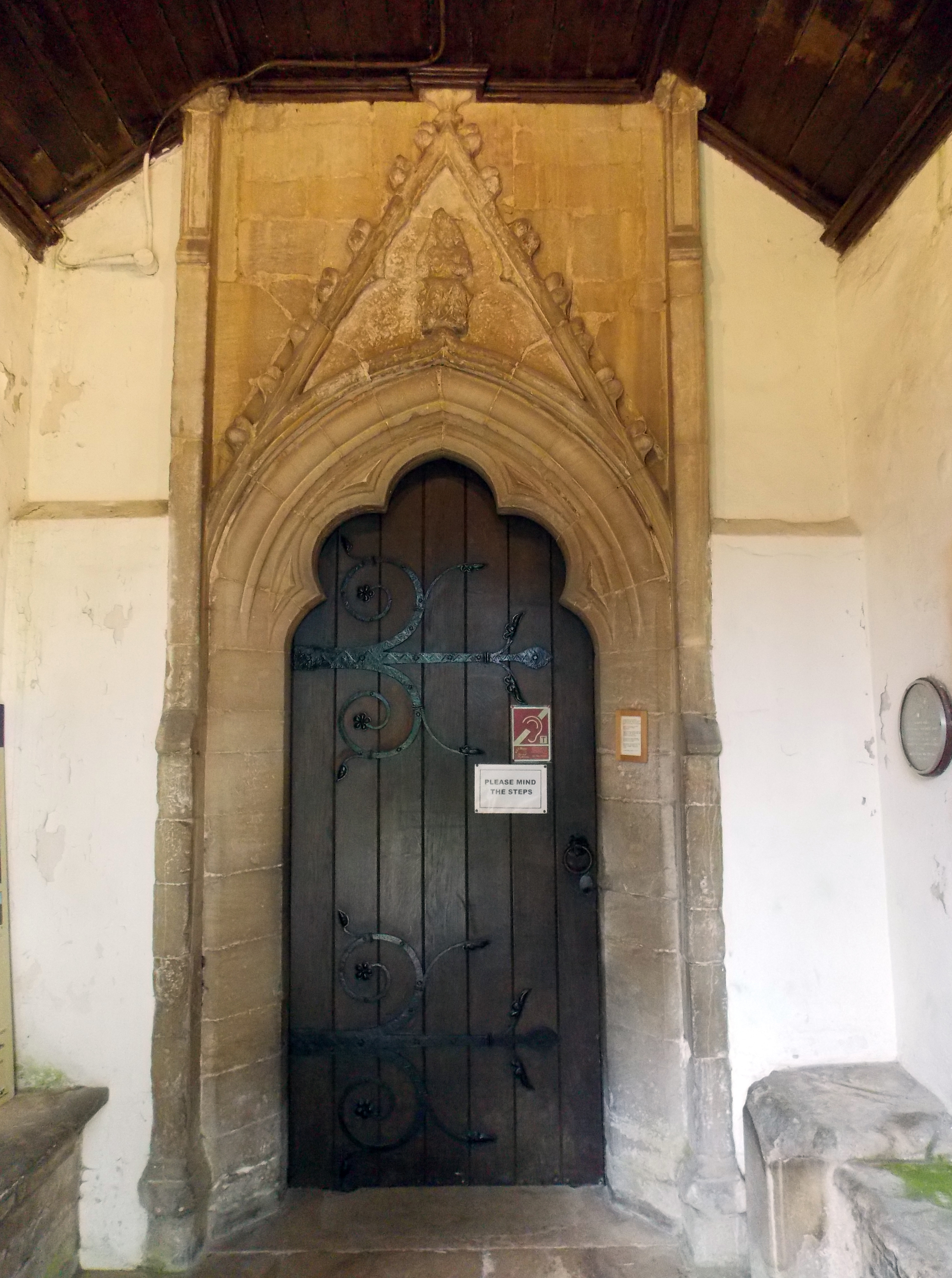
South door exterior within porch

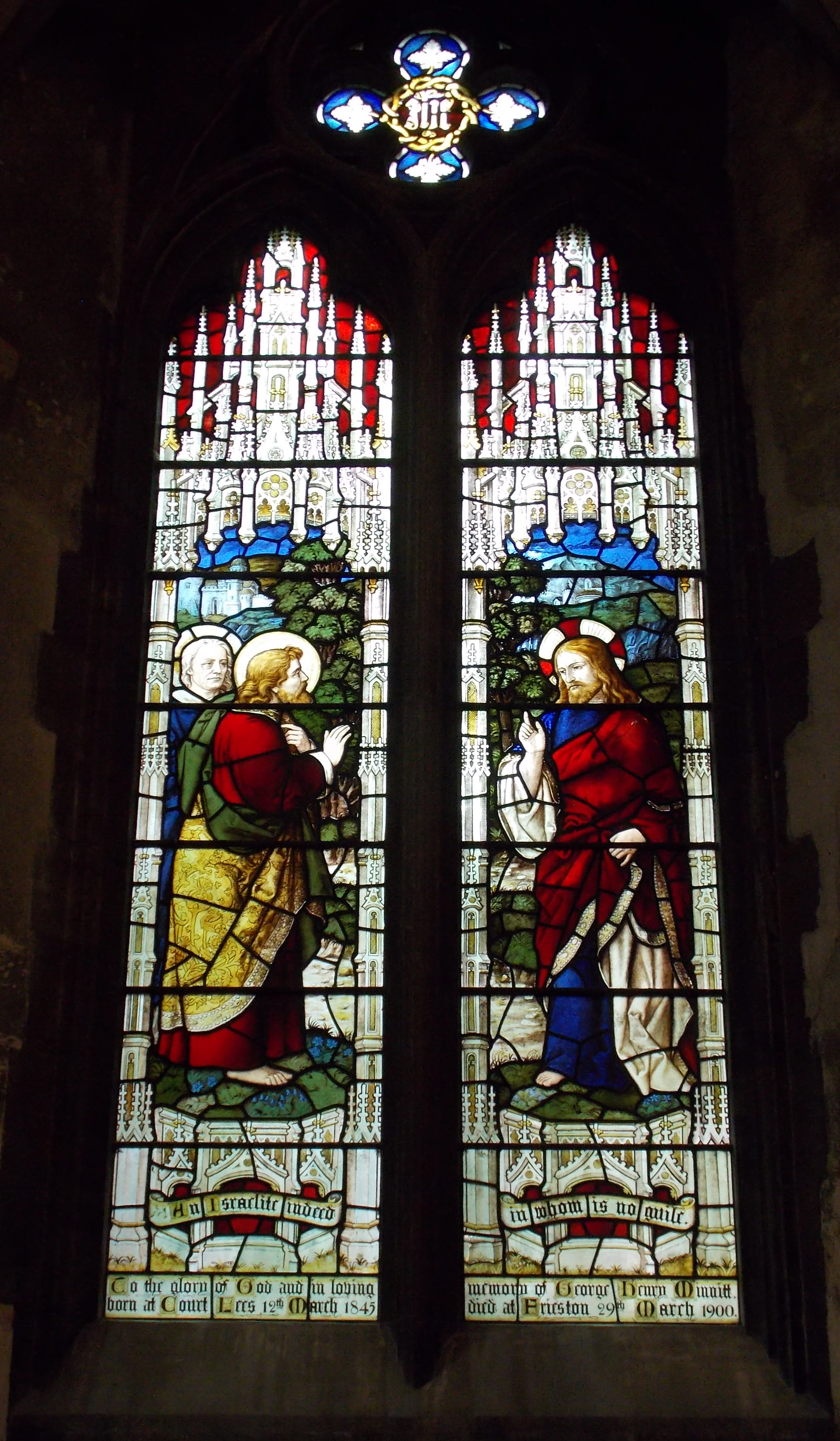
North aisle stained glass window to George Henry Minnit

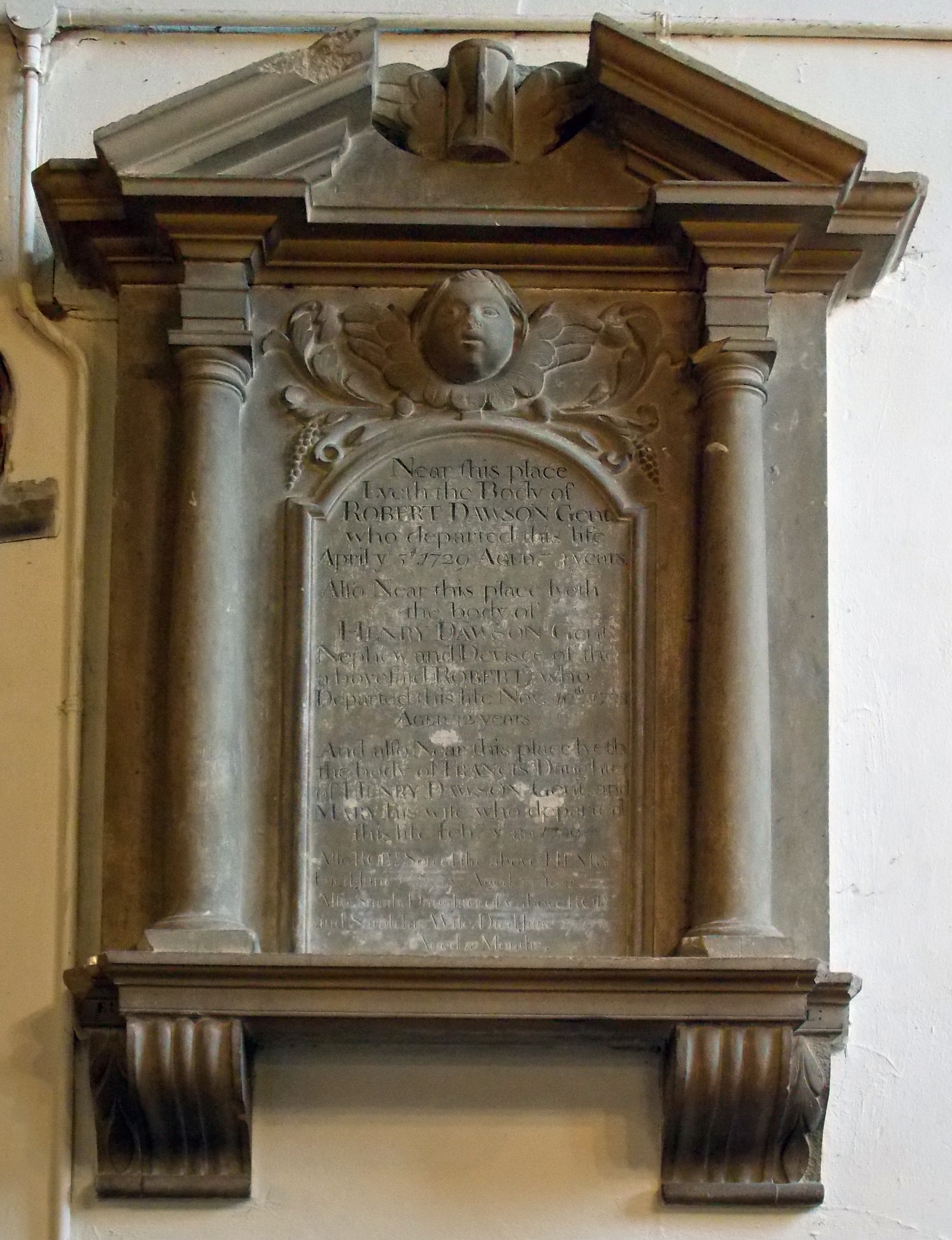
Nave memorial to Robert Dawson

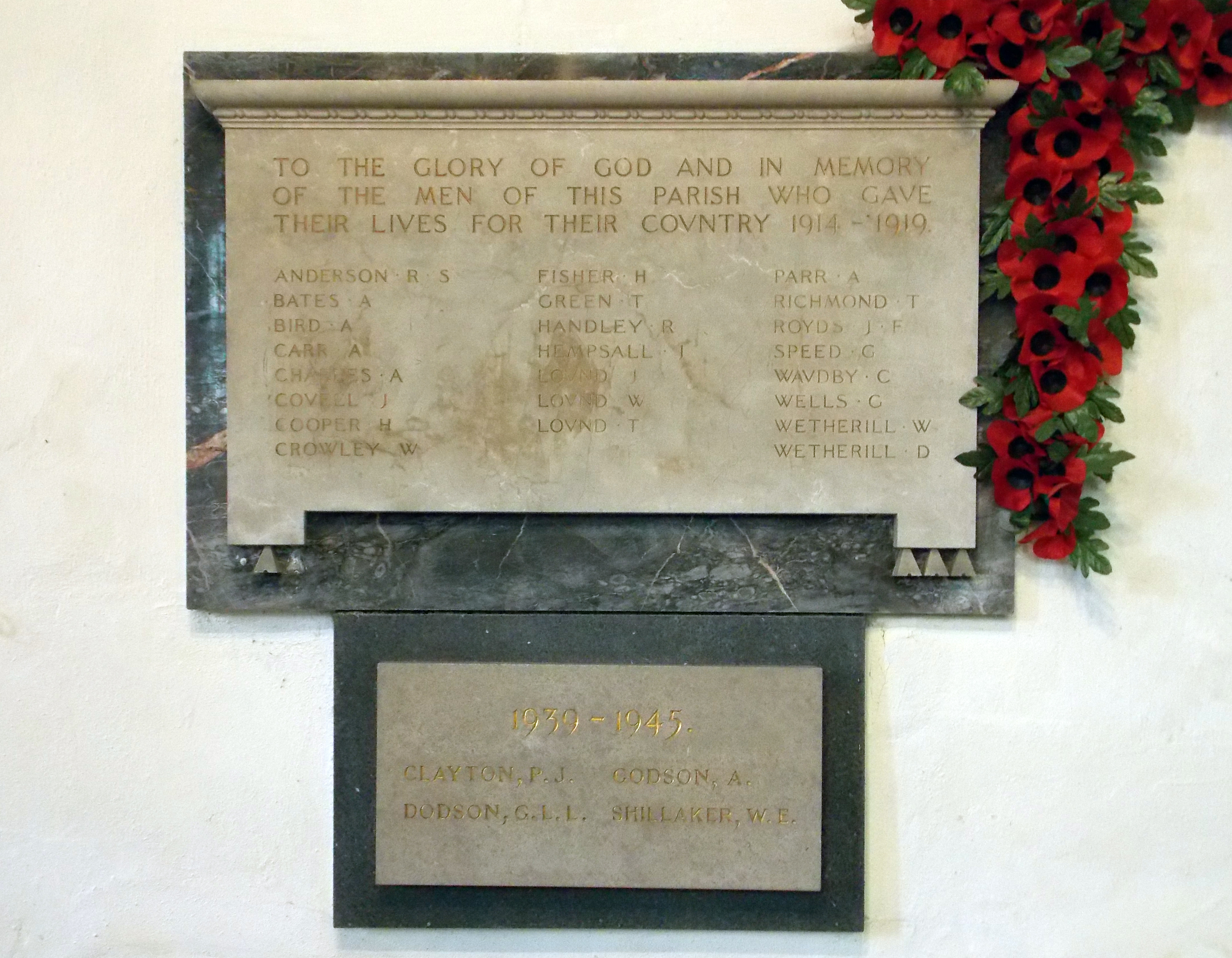
North aisle World War memorial

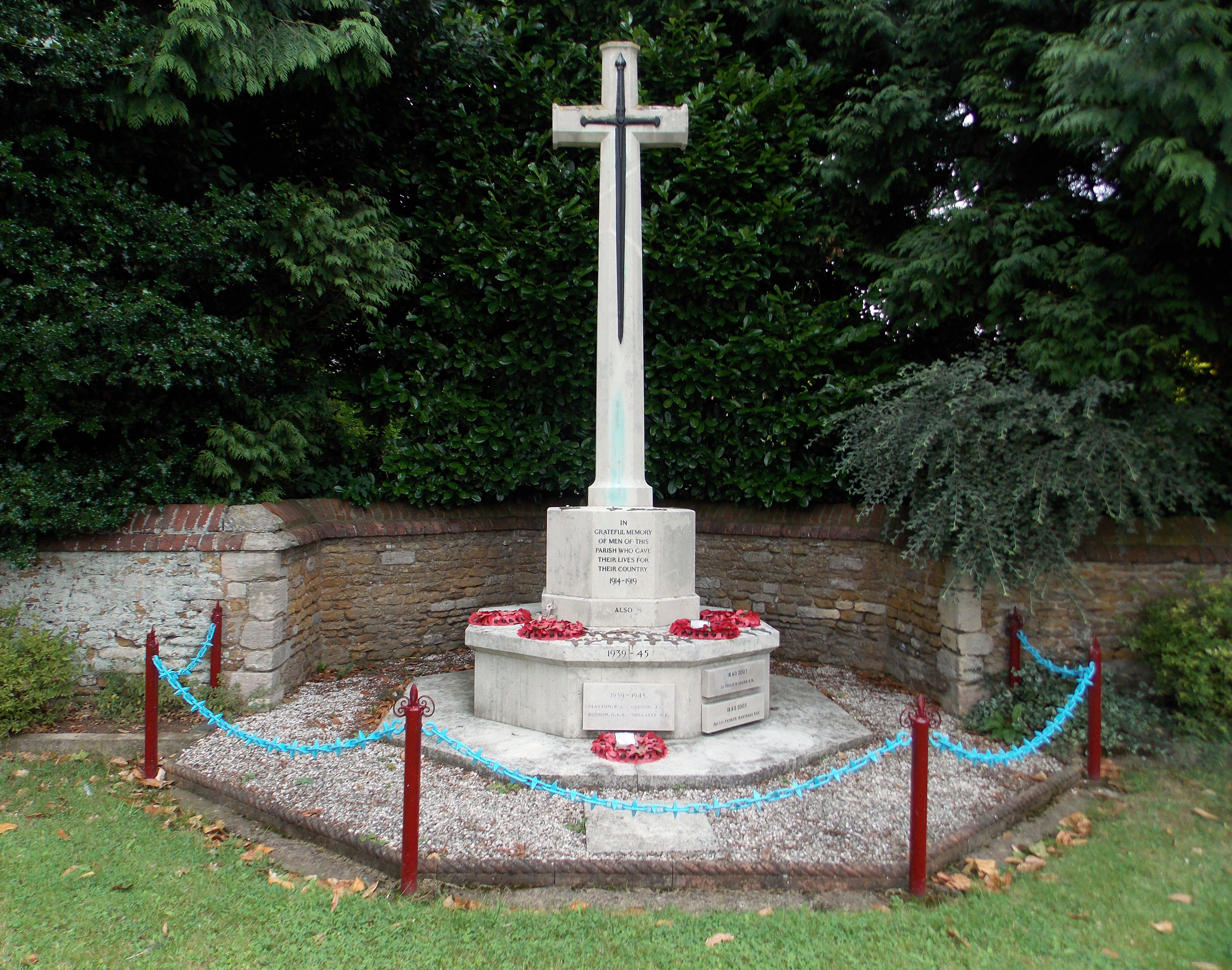
Village war memorial adjacent to churchyard gate
