= 1185 East Midlands earthquake =

Earthquake in England

- Location within England
- Local date: 15 April 1185
- Local time: 6th hour of the day
- Magnitude: 5.1 M_{w}
- Depth: 10 km
- Epicentre: 53.11°N 0.781°E
- Areas affected: England
- Max. intensity: EMS-98 VII (Damaging)

The 1185 East Midlands earthquake happened in England. It is the first earthquake in England for which there are reliable reports indicating damage. The moment magnitude of the shock was estimated to be above 5.0 and its intensity was placed at VII (Damaging) on the European macroseismic scale.

== Earthquake ==
The earthquake of 15 April 1185 in the region of East Midlands was one of the largest and most damaging earthquakes the British Isles had ever encountered. The magnitude has been estimated at 5 M_{w}. Some think the epicentre of the earthquake was close to Nottingham in the East Midlands. The epicentre has also been suggested to be in or around Lincolnshire. However, it could possibly be anywhere from Dogger Bank to the East Midlands. Some references talk of the earthquake happening somewhere offshore in the North Sea east of northern England; its effects may have been felt as far away as Norway.

The historian Matthew Paris did not report it as being felt in London. His history records show that the first major earthquake in England since 1133 was the one of 13 February 1247.

== Damage ==
There are reports of complete villages being totally demolished, including the villages of Raleigh and Danethorpe. (Note: See List of lost settlements in the United Kingdom.) The hamlet of Grimston, now referred to as Wellow, may also have suffered damage, but that is debatable as the land was used for expansion of Rufford Abbey, and there is confusion as to what actually happened to the small hamlet.

Masonry houses were knocked down completely, which indicates an intensity of more than VII EMS at certain locations. Ralph of Diceto reported in writings done in London that it struck in northern England and that "in some places buildings were destroyed". There are also reports that stones were split ("petrae enim scissae sunt"); stone houses were knocked down; and that parts of Lincoln Cathedral were brought down. The damage to Lincoln cathedral has been a controversial issue because it cannot be determined to what extent the earthquake damaged it and what parts fell on their own due to poor construction. The city of Lincoln was reported to have been damaged by the earthquake.

== See also ==
- List of earthquakes in the British Isles
- List of historical earthquakes
