= Caythorpe, Lincolnshire =

Village in Lincolnshire, England

Coordinates: 53.021155°N 0.599325°W

Caythorpe
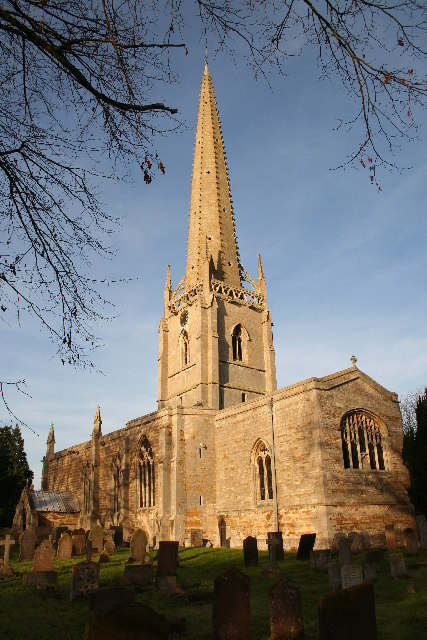
- St Vincent's Church, Caythorpe

- Location within Lincolnshire
- Population: 1,374 (2011)
- OS grid reference: SK939479
  - London: 105 mi (169 km) S
- Civil parish: Caythorpe and Frieston
- District: South Kesteven
- Shire county: Lincolnshire
- Region: East Midlands
- Country: England
- Sovereign state: United Kingdom
- Post town: GRANTHAM
- Postcode district: NG32
- Dialling code: 01400
- Police: Lincolnshire
- Fire: Lincolnshire
- Ambulance: East Midlands
- UK Parliament: Sleaford and North Hykeham

Caythorpe is a village and civil parish in the South Kesteven district of Lincolnshire, England. The population at 2011 census was 1,374. It is situated on the A607, approximately 3 miles (5 km) south from Leadenham and 9 miles (14 km) north from Grantham. Caythorpe Heath stretches east of the village to Ermine Street and Byards Leap.

== Arnhem heritage ==
Caythorpe is known for the soldiers based in the village during the Second World War. The 1st Airborne Signals Regiment took part in Operation Market Garden and fought for the bridges of Arnhem against the Nazis. Survivors of the Battle of Arnhem return to the village every late summer with the 216 Signals Regiment for Arnhem Weekend. There is a church service held in St Vincent's Church, a Gala, parade through the village of the veterans and soldiers and other events in the village. The Paratroopers HQ was Holy Cross House to the south of the village which no longer stands (which was known to be haunted by ‘the grey lady’), now there is a small housing estate. There is a stained glass window memorial in St Vincent's Church.

== Anglo-Saxon and Norman history ==
Before the Norman Conquest, Aelric (son of Mergeat) was the lord of the parish. After the Conquest of England by William the Conqueror the lord (as recorded in the 1086 Domesday Book) was Robert de Vessey. He was most likely rewarded with land by King William I after the invasion as he didn't own land prior. The Domesday Book noted that Caythorpe was in the hundred of Lovden and had a population of 172 (top 20% of settlements recorded).

== Village ==
Caythorpe Grade I listed Anglican parish church is dedicated to St Vincent. The church has a wide double nave divided by Geometric (early Decorated) piers. The central tower supports a crocketed spire rising to 156 feet. Within the church are monuments to the Hussey family, dated 1698 and 1725, and over the tower arch are remains of paintings of the Last Judgment, The churchyard cross, restored in 1906, is a scheduled ancient monument.

Grade II* listed Caythorpe Court lies on the northern edge of the village; it was built between 1824 and 1827 in the classical style. The park wall is all that remains of the earlier house, the seat of the Hussey family.

The Red Lion and the Waggon and Horses are the two village public houses.

There was once served by a railway station on the Grantham and Lincoln railway line.

Mensa International has had its registered office in the village since 2008.

== Agricultural college ==
Caythorpe Court, to the east of the village, was built as a hunting lodge, used in the Second World War as an auxiliary hospital and from 1946 it was Kesteven Agricultural College – the only college of its type in south-west Lincolnshire, recognised nationally for its excellence in agricultural engineering. In 1980 it became part of Lincolnshire College of Agriculture and Horticulture, and in 1994 was taken over by De Montfort University. When Riseholme Agricultural College, also part of De Montfort, was adopted by the new University of Lincoln in 2001, Caythorpe was subsumed into Lincoln as the Lincolnshire School of Agriculture. The school closed in September 2002, after which the building became a PGL activity centre.

== Notable people ==
Edmund Weaver, 18th-century astronomer and land agent, lived at Frieston. He was buried at St Vincent's Church, where his memorial is placed in the south chancel. George Hussey Packe (1796–1874), MP for the Southern Division of the County of Lincolnshire and Chairman of the Great Northern Railway, built and lived at Caythorpe Hall and provided the village school and patronage for St Vincent's Church.

== Gallery ==
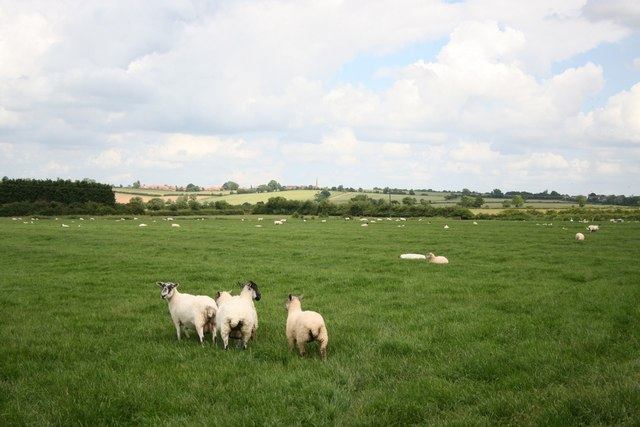
View towards Caythorpe from the south-west

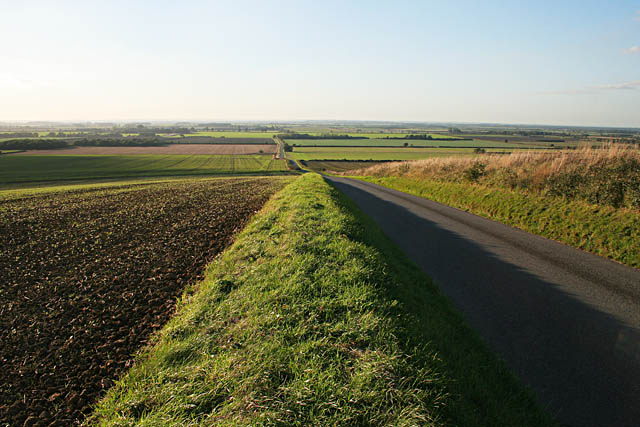
Caythorpe Low Fields

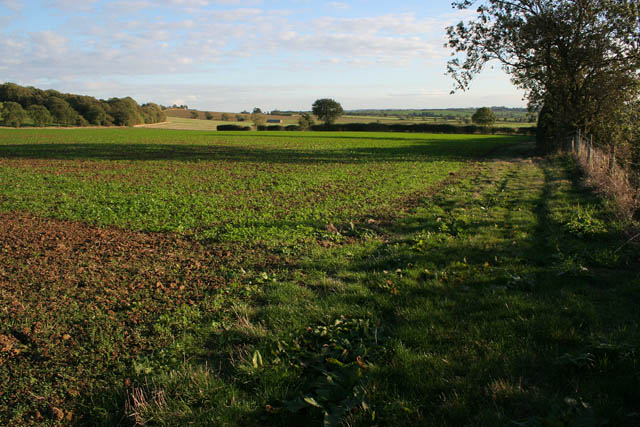
Gorse Hill Lane
