= List of earthquakes in the British Isles =

Epicentres of notable earthquakes in the British Isles

The following is a list of notable earthquakes that have affected the British Isles. On average, several hundred earthquakes are detected by the British Geological Survey each year, but almost all are far too faint to be felt by humans. Those that are felt generally cause very little damage. Nonetheless, earthquakes have on occasion resulted in considerable damage, most notably in 1580 and 1884; Musson (2003) reports that there have been ten documented fatalities – six caused by falling masonry and four by building collapse. The causes of earthquakes in the UK are unclear, but may include "regional compression caused by motion of the Earth’s tectonic plates, and uplift resulting from the melting of the ice sheets that covered many parts of Britain thousands of years ago." Medieval reports of "earthquakes" that threw down newly built cathedrals may simply have been catastrophic failure of overloaded masonry, particularly towers, rather than actual tectonic events.

== Earthquakes ==
Date	Location	Lat	Long	Intensity	$M_L$	Casualties	Comments	Source
15 April 1185	Lincoln, Lincolnshire, England			~VIII			Lincoln Cathedral badly damaged. See 1185 East Midlands earthquake.	
20 February 1247	South Wales to London, England				≳5.5		Felt in England, Wales, Scotland and Ireland	
21 December 1248	South West England			VII–VIII			Wells Cathedral reported to have been badly damaged	
11 September 1275	South Wales to Southern England			>VII	~6.0	Multiple fatalities	In Glastonbury, the Abbey was damaged and the Church of St. Michael on the Torr Hill destroyed. "Only contemporary report of earthquake fatalities before 1580". See 1275 British earthquake	
21 May 1382	Strait of Dover, England	51.34	2.00	VII–VIII	>5.5		The bell tower of the cathedral was "severely damaged" and the six bells "shook down". Cloister walls to the Canterbury dormitory were ruined. In Kent, All Saints Church, West Stourmouth, was badly damaged. Felt in London (MMVI) and lent its name to the "Earthquake Synod". See 1382 Dover Straits earthquake	
28 December 1480	Norwich, England			VIII			Severe damage reported affecting a wide area	
6 April 1580	Strait of Dover, England	51.06	1.60	VII–VIII	~5.8	2 fatalities	See Dover Straits earthquake of 1580	
11 April 1650	Cumberland, England	54.98	−2.78	VII	4.9		Epicentre probably near Carlisle, felt at Glasgow	
18 September 1692	Duchy of Brabant, Belgium	50.8	4.8		~6.0		Felt in most parts of England, France, Germany and the Netherlands	
19 July 1727	Swansea, Wales	51.57	-3.76	VII	3.3		Rang church bells as far away as Oxford.	
8 September 1775	Swansea, Wales	51.73	−3.81	VII	5.1		Some buildings said to have collapsed, felt from Devon to Lancashire to Surrey	
7 September 1801	Comrie, Perth and Kinross, Scotland	56.4	−3.99	VI	4.6	2 fatalities	Two farmworkers were killed when part of a barn collapsed	
17 March 1816	Mansfield, England	53.09	−1.18	VII	4.2	Several injuries	Falling masonry injured several in the church at Mansfield, felt from Blackburn to Hull to Gumley	
27 August 1834	Chichester, England	50.82	−0.82	VII	3.3		Last in a sequence of damaging earthquakes starting with an event in September 1833 that caused the death of a quarryman	
23 October 1839	Comrie, Perth and Kinross, Scotland			VII	~4.8		Part of a long-lived earthquake swarm. This was the largest of all known Comrie earthquakes, and was felt over most of Scotland. It caused a dam near Stirling to breach.	
9 November 1852	Caernarfon, Wales	53.02	−4.30	VII	5.3		Similar to the 1984 Llŷn Peninsula earthquake, felt in Dublin, Belfast, Carlisle and Cheltenham	
15 February 1865	Barrow in Furness, England	54.07	−3.18	VIII	2.2		Small area of high intensity indicating a shallow focus (≤1 km)	
28 November 1880	Argyll, Argyll and Bute, Scotland	56.19	−5.30	VI	~5.2		Largest recorded earthquake in Scotland.	
22 April 1884	Colchester, Essex, England	51.82	0.90	VIII	~4.6	2 fatalities	The most damaging earthquake since 1580. At least two indirect fatalities reported. Felt in France and Belgium. See 1884 Colchester earthquake.	
18 August 1892	Pembroke, Wales	51.70	−5.04	VII	5.1		Felt most strongly in Wales and South West England, but also felt in SE Ireland	
17 December 1896	Hereford, England	52.02	−2.55	VII			Felt widely throughout England and Wales and E Ireland	
18 September 1901	Inverness, Scotland	57.43	−4.32	VII	5.0		Considerable minor damage, many falling chimney pots. Many foreshocks and aftershocks.	
24 March 1903	Derby, England	53.05	−1.70	VII	4.6		Felt from Hoylake, to Boston and Richmond to Barnt Green	
27 June 1906	Swansea, Wales	51.62	−3.81	VII	5.2	3 injured	One of the most damaging British earthquakes of the 20th century. See 1906 Swansea earthquake.	
14 January 1916	Stafford, England	52.85	−2.19	VII	4.6		Significant damage at Chebsey	
4 April 1924	Mansfield, England	53.11	−1.34	VII			Most damaging of a sequence that started on 3 March	
15 August 1926	Ludlow, England	52.31	−2.66	VII	4.8		Felt from Plymouth to Hull	
3 May 1931	Manchester, England	53.50	−2.35	VII	3.7		Small but damaging earthquake	
7 June 1931	Dogger Bank, North Sea	54.08	1.50	VII	6.1	2 fatalities	Strongest recorded instrumentally. See 1931 Dogger Bank earthquake.	
16 July 1940	Kilsyth, Scotland	56.00	−4.00	VII–VIII	3.7		House gable collapsed at Carronbridge	
12 December 1940	Caernarfon, Wales	53.03	−4.18	V	4.7	1 fatalities	An elderly woman was killed after she fell down the stairs	
30 December 1944	Skipton, England	53.86	−2.02	VII	4.8		Generally minor damage	
11 February 1957	Derby, England	52.80	−1.33	VII	5.3		Felt across central England. Largest UK post-war earthquake until 1984, and one of the most damaging earthquakes of the twentieth century.	
26 December 1979	Longtown, Cumbria, England	55.03	−2.82	VI	4.7		Damage to buildings in Canonbie, Carlisle, and Glasgow.	
19 July 1984	Llŷn Peninsula, Gwynedd, Wales	52.96	−4.38	VII	5.4	Several injuries	Felt across Ireland and western Great Britain. See 1984 Llŷn Peninsula earthquake.	
2 April 1990	Bishop's Castle, England	52.43	−3.03	VI	5.1		Very widely felt in Wales and England. See 1990 Bishop's Castle earthquake.	
22 September 2002	Dudley, West Midlands, England	52.53	−2.16	V	4.7		Widely felt in England and Wales.	
21 October 2002	Manchester, England				3.9		Largest in an earthquake swarm of 116 earthquakes, 36 of which were felt	
28 April 2007	Folkestone, Kent	51.10	1.17	VI	4.3	2 injured	Caused significant damage in Folkestone, felt throughout Kent. See 2007 Kent earthquake.	
27 February 2008	Market Rasen, Lincolnshire, England	53.400	−0.332	VI	5.2	1 injuries	Felt widely in England and Wales. See 2008 Market Rasen earthquake.	
1 April 2011	Blackpool, England				2.3		First of two minor earthquakes that were caused by fracking carried out by Cuadrilla	
Note: The inclusion criteria for adding events are based on WikiProject Earthquakes' notability essay that was developed for stand alone articles. The principles described also apply to lists. In summary, only damaging, injurious, or deadly events should be recorded.

== See also ==
- Geology of England
- Geology of Great Britain
- List of volcanoes in the United Kingdom
