= James Yeats =

James Yeats may refer to:

- James Yeats (American football) player for 1960 Houston Oilers season
- James Yeats, character in British Intelligence (film)

== See also ==
- James Yates (disambiguation)
