= 1580 Dover Straits earthquake =

Magnitude 5 earthquake affecting England and France

- Local date: 6 April 1580
- Local time: 18:00
- Magnitude: 5.3–5.9 M_{L} (estimate)
- Depth: Approximately 20 kilometres (12 mi) (estimate)
- Epicentre: 51.06°N 1.60°E
- Areas affected: England, Flanders, northern France
- Casualties: 2 killed in England, "many" in France and "several" in Flanders

Though severe earthquakes in Britain and northern France are rare, the 1580 Dover Straits earthquake appears to have been one of the largest in the recorded history of England, Flanders or northern France. Its effects started to be felt in London at around six o'clock in the evening of 6 April 1580, being Wednesday in the Easter week.

== Location and magnitude ==
A study undertaken during the design of the Channel Tunnel estimated the magnitude of the 1580 quake at 5.3–5.9 M_{L} and its focal depth at 20–30 km, in the lower crust. The Channel Tunnel was therefore designed to withstand those tremors. Being relatively deep, the quake was felt over a large area and it is not certain where the epicentre was located. The Channel Tunnel study proposed three possible locations, two south of Calais and one offshore. The barycentre of the isoseismals with intensities IV to VII lies in the Boulonnais, 10 km east of Desvres, the barycentre of the VII isoseismal lies about 1 km northeast of Ardres, and the barycentre of the only pleistoseismal zone lies in the English Channel.

The British Geological Survey estimates the magnitude to be 5.7–5.8 M_{L}.

== Records ==
The earthquake is well recorded in contemporary documents, including the "earthquake letter" from Gabriel Harvey to Edmund Spenser mocking popular and academic methods of accounting for the tremors. It fell during Easter week, an omen-filled connection that was not lost on the servant-poet James Yates, who wrote ten stanzas on the topic:

Oh sudden motion, and shaking of the earth,
No blustering blastes, the weather calme and milde:
Good Lord the sudden rarenesse of the thing

A sudden feare did bring, to man and childe,

They verely thought, as well in field as Towne,
The earth should sinke, and the houses all fall downe.

Well let vs print this present in our heartes,

And call to God, for neuer neede we more:

Crauing of him mercy for our misdeedes,

Our sinfull liues from heart for to deplore,

For let vs thinke this token doth portend,
If scourge nere hand, if we do still offend.

Yates' poem was printed in 1582 in The Castell of Courtesy.

English writer Thomas Churchyard, then aged 60, was in London when the quake struck and he drafted an immediate account which was published two days later. In his 2007 biography of Richard Hakluyt, historian Peter C. Mancall provides extensive extracts from Churchyard's 8 April 1580 pamphlet, A Warning to the Wyse, a Feare to the Fond, a Bridle to the Lewde, and a Glasse to the Good; written of the late Earthquake chanced in London and other places, the 6th of April, 1580, for the Glory of God and benefit of men, that warely can walk, and wisely judge. Set forth in verse and prose, by Thomas Churchyard, gentleman. Mancall notes that Churchyard's pamphlet provides a sense of immediacy so often lacking in retrospective writing. According to Churchyard, the quake could be felt across the city and well into the suburbs, as "a wonderful motion and trembling of the earth" shook London, and "Churches, Pallaces, houses, and other buildings did so quiver and shake, that such as were then present in the same were toosed too and fro as they stoode, and others, as they sate on seates, driven off their places."

The English public was so eager to read about the quake that a few months later, Abraham Fleming was able to publish a collection of reports of the Easter Earthquake, including those written by Thomas Churchyard, Richard Tarlton (described as the writing clown of Shakespeare's day), Francis Schackleton, Arthur Golding, Thomas Twine, John Philippes, Robert Gittins, and John Grafton, as well as Fleming's own account. Published by Henry Denham on 27 June 1580, Fleming's pamphlet was titled: A Bright Burning Beacon, forewarning all wise Virgins to trim their lampes against the coming of the Bridegroome. Conteining A generall doctrine of sundrie signes and wonders, specially Earthquakes both particular and generall: A discourse of the end of this world: A commemoration of our late Earthquake, the 6 of April, about 6 of the clocke in the evening 1580. And a praier for the appeasing of Gods wrath and indignation. Newly translated and collected by Abraham Fleming.

Shirley Collins cites ballad-writer Thomas Deloney as having written the broadside ballad "Awake Awake" about the earthquake, which she subsequently recorded on her 2016 album Lodestar. In the sleeve notes she states "Awake Awake is a fascinating survival of the penitential song written in 1580 by ballad-writer Thomas Deloney, when the Great Earthquake in London toppled part of old St Paul's Cathedral, Deloney taking it as a sign of God's displeasure. Over three hundred years later, in 1909, Ralph Vaughan Williams noted down this version from the singing of Mrs Caroline Bridges of Pembridge and it's in Mary Ellen Leather's (1912). A remarkable journey down through those many years." An adaptation of the original tune was subsequently put to the carol "God Rest Ye Merry Gentlemen" by Ralph Vaughan Williams.

== Impact ==
Farther from the coast, furniture danced on the floors and wine casks rolled off their stands. The belfry of Notre Dame de Lorette and several buildings at Lille collapsed. Stones fell from buildings in Arras, Douai, Béthune and Rouen. Windows cracked in the cathedral of Notre Dame at Pontoise, and blocks of stone dropped ominously from the vaulting. At Beauvais, the bells rang as though sounding the tocsin. Many deaths were reported from Saint-Amand-les-Eaux.

In Flanders, chimneys fell and cracks opened in the walls of Ghent and Oudenarde, killing several people. Peasants in the fields reported a low rumble and saw the ground roll in waves.

On the English coast, sections of wall fell in Dover and a landslip opened a raw new piece of the White Cliffs. At Sandwich a loud noise emanated from the Channel, as church arches cracked and the gable end of a transept fell at St Peter's Church. Near Hythe, Kent, Saltwood Castle—made famous as the site where the plot was hatched in December 1170 to assassinate Thomas Becket—was rendered uninhabitable until it was repaired in the 19th century.

In London, half a dozen chimney stacks and a pinnacle on Westminster Abbey came down; two children were killed by stones falling from the roof of Christ's Church Hospital. Indeed, many Puritans blamed the emerging theatre scene of the time in London, which was seen as the work of the Devil, as a cause of the quake. There was damage far inland, in Cambridgeshire, where stones fell from Ely Cathedral. Part of Stratford Castle in Essex collapsed.

In Scotland, a local report of the quake disturbed the adolescent James VI, who was informed that it was the work of the Devil.

There were aftershocks. Before dawn the next morning, between 4 and 5 o'clock, further houses collapsed near Dover due to aftershocks, and a spate of further aftershocks was noticed in east Kent on 1–2 May.

== Other earthquakes in the Dover Straits ==
198 years earlier there was a very similar event, the magnitude 5.8–6.0 1382 Dover Straits earthquake, with an estimated epicentre not far from that estimated for the 1580 event. Two later quakes in the Dover Strait, in 1776 and 1950, both thought to be around magnitude 4, were noted in the 1984 compilation by R.M.W. Musson, G. Neilson and P.W. Burton. None in this study occurred before 1727, but the same team devoted an article to the 1580 earthquake that year.

The 2007 Kent earthquake was initially thought to have occurred in the Dover Straits, but later analysis showed it to have occurred directly under the town of Folkestone in Kent.

== See also ==
- Geology of Great Britain
- List of earthquakes in the British Isles
- List of earthquakes in France
