= Frieston =

Village in South Kesteven, Lincolnshire, England

Coordinates: 53.017769°N 0.602991°W

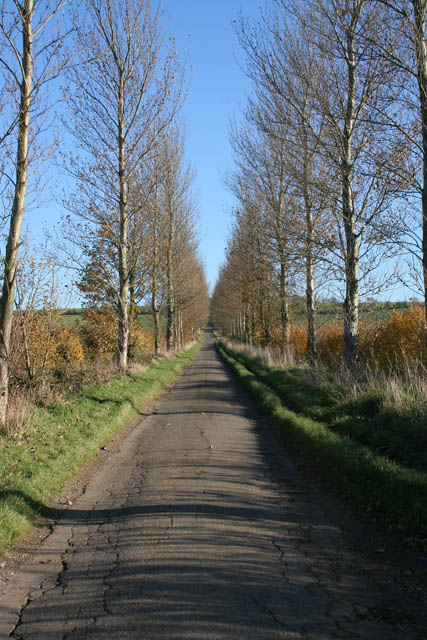
- Frieston Heath Lane

- Location within Lincolnshire
- OS grid reference: SK938476
  - London: 105 mi (169 km) S
- Civil parish: Caythorpe
- District: South Kesteven
- Shire county: Lincolnshire
- Region: East Midlands
- Country: England
- Sovereign state: United Kingdom
- Post town: Grantham
- Postcode district: NG32
- Police: Lincolnshire
- Fire: Lincolnshire
- Ambulance: East Midlands
- UK Parliament: Sleaford and North Hykeham

Frieston is a village in the South Kesteven district of Lincolnshire, England. It is situated just west of the A607 road, and 7 miles (11 km) north from the market town of Grantham. Frieston is conjoined to the southern part of the village of Caythorpe.

Frieston lies within Caythorpe civil parish. Local government has been arranged in this way since the reorganisation of 1 April 1974, which resulted from the Local Government Act 1972. Hitherto, the parish had formed part of the Parts of Kesteven. Kesteven was one of the three divisions (formally known as parts) of the traditional county of Lincolnshire. Since the Local Government Act 1888 Kesteven had been, in most respects, a county in itself.

It is believed that the name 'Frieston' is derived from the Frisians, who are known to have settled in Britain during the 5th and 6th Centuries AD. However, their numbers were small compared to the much larger Anglo-Saxon population. The thorpe element of Caythorpe indicates a secondary settlement by Vikings, in this case probably Danes, at some time between 800 and 1050.

== Notable people ==
- Edmund Weaver, 18th-century astronomer and land agent, lived at Frieston. He was buried at St Vincent's Church, Caythorpe, where his memorial is placed in the south chancel.
