= Edmund Weaver (astronomer) =

- Born: c. 1683
- Died: 27 December 1748 (aged 64–65)
- Scientific career
- Fields: Astronomy

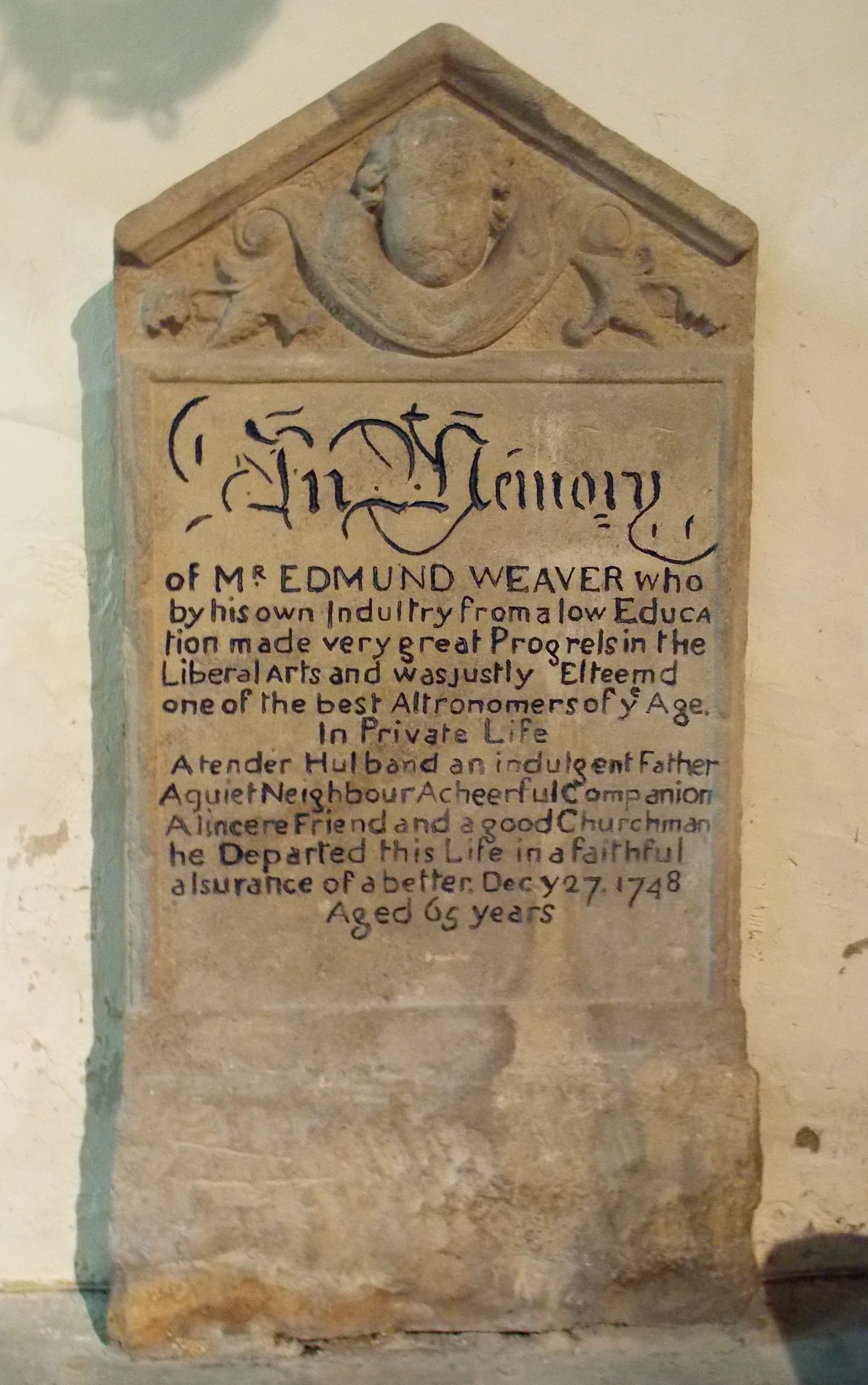
Memorial to Edmund Weaver in St Vincent's Church, Caythorpe

Edmund Weaver (c. 1683 – 27 December 1748) was an English astronomer, land surveyor, and friend to William Stukeley. Weaver's The British Telescope ephemerides (astronomical tables) is considered an important 18th-century publication on the movement of planets.

== Personal life ==
Edmund Weaver was born circa 1683 and lived at Frieston in Lincolnshire. He died on 27 December 1748, and was buried at St Vincent's Church, Caythorpe, the village to the north of his home at Frieston. The south chancel at St Vincent's contains a memorial to him.

== Astronomy ==
Self-taught, Weaver wrote The British Telescope, which led antiquarian William Stukeley to describe him as "a very uncommon genius, who had made himself master in astronomy and was scarcely to be accounted the second in the kingdom". It was through association with Weaver that Stukeley developed an interest in astronomy. Weaver's writing on astronomy and astrology was also appreciated by Martin Folkes, the president of the Society of Antiquaries.

Weaver supported the heliocentric view of the universe. He opposed criticism of the accuracy of ephemerides formulated by Edmond Halley, the Astronomer Royal, particularly that from Tycho Wing. Through his 1741 edition of The British Telescope, he described the path of the forthcoming 1769 transit of Venus as curved, and planetary movement as elliptical, attracting the attention of the Royal Astronomer journal.

== Land survey ==
In 1734, Weaver printed Proposals for making and publishing for Subscription an actual Survey of the County of Lincoln. The project was started but unfinished, with only a map and measurements of certain roads and bearings between places remaining. A correspondent to The Gentleman's Magazine, after examining the project in Weaver's effects, described him as "a noted Astrologer, Almanack-maker, Quack Doctor, Land Surveyor". The proposed survey of Lincolnshire would include all wapentakes, churches, chapels, religious houses, chaces and parks, notable houses, castles, and nobility. It would cover all parishes, settlements, waterways, bridges, and roads, would be carried out with contemporary technological equipment, and would be fully indexed.
