= 1984 Llŷn Peninsula earthquake =

Category-6 seismic tremor in northwest Wales, Britain

- Location within Gwynedd Location within the United Kingdom
- UTC time: 1984-07-19 06:56:10
- ISC event: 549253
- USGS-ANSS: ComCat
- Local date: 19 July 1984
- Local time: 07:56 (UTC +1)
- Magnitude: 5.4 M_{L}
- Depth: 20.7 kilometres (13 mi)
- Epicentre: 52.96°N 4.38°W
- Areas affected: United Kingdom; Ireland
- Max. intensity: MMI VI (Strong) EMS-98 VI (Slightly damaging)
- Casualties: Several injured

The 1984 Llŷn Peninsula earthquake struck the Llŷn Peninsula in Gwynedd, northwest Wales on Thursday 19 July 1984 at 06:56 UTC (07:56 BST). Measuring 5.4 on the Richter scale, it is the largest onshore earthquake to occur in the UK since instrumental measurements began.

The effects were felt throughout Wales, most of England, and parts of Ireland and Scotland. There were many reports of minor damage to chimneys and masonry throughout Wales and England, the biggest concentration of damage being in Liverpool, which is located around 65 miles northeast of the epicentre. Minor injuries were also reported in the areas surrounding the epicentral area, and rockslides occurred at Tremadog in Gwynedd.

The 19 July earthquake was followed by many aftershocks in the following months, the largest measuring 4.3 on the Richter scale, which itself was felt as far away as Dublin, in Ireland.

== Earthquake characteristics ==
The earthquake's epicentre was located on the Llŷn Peninsula at coordinates 52.978°N, 4.427°W (near grid reference SH371451). The focus, or hypocentre (the point within the Earth where the earthquake originated), was unusually deep at roughly 18 km beneath the surface. Body-wave magnitude measurements from European stations gave a value of 5.2, while the United States National Earthquake Information Center reported magnitudes of 5.0 Mb (body-wave) and 4.7 MS (surface-wave).

The earthquake was notable for its significant depth, occurring in what seismologists describe as the lower crust. This deep origin indicates an unusually deep transition between the brittle upper crust (where rocks fracture) and the ductile lower crust (where rocks deform plastically without breaking). This depth is possibly related to reduced heat flow in the region.

The focal mechanism (which describes the orientation of the fault and the direction of slip) indicated a predominantly strike-slip movement—where blocks of crust slide horizontally past each other—with a component of normal faulting. The earthquake did not correlate with movement on any of the major faults visible at the surface in the area, including the Menai Straits fault system.

Analysis revealed a northwest-southeast oriented maximum compressional stress direction, which agrees with measurements made in other parts of Britain. This provided valuable information about the regional stress patterns affecting the British Isles.

== Aftershocks ==
Following the main shock, a dense network of 14 seismograph stations was installed in Northwest Wales to study the aftershock sequence. In the first four weeks, aftershocks with magnitudes greater than 1.0 ML occurred at an average rate of about 20 per week. The two largest aftershocks, on 29 July (magnitude 4.0) and 18 August 1984 (magnitude 4.3), were felt as far away as Dublin and Merseyside.

The aftershocks clustered at depths between 21 and 24 km, forming a group about 3 km wide with no clear linear pattern. The aftershock mechanisms showed varied types of faulting, including thrust, normal, strike-slip, and oblique movements.

== Effects and damage ==
The maximum intensity of the earthquake reached VI on the MSK scale (similar to the Modified Mercalli scale), affecting most of the Llŷn Peninsula over an area of roughly 800 km^{2}. At this intensity, widespread cracks appeared in plaster, and some chimneys and weak masonry collapsed. The earthquake produced notably loud audible effects, indicating significant high-frequency energy. Liverpool experienced anomalously high intensities (V-VI), likely due to the vulnerability of some buildings and possible soil amplification effects on made-up ground and alluvium.

The earthquake was felt across a total area of approximately 250,000 km^{2}, with the mean radius of the area where it was clearly felt (intensity III) extending to 280 km from the epicentre. The extensive macroseismic data (information about how people experienced the earthquake) collected from this event has been valuable for calibrating historical earthquake records where instrumental data are limited or absent.

== Historical context and significance ==
The 1984 earthquake was not an isolated event for the region. Northwest Wales had previously experienced significant earthquakes in 1852, 1903, and 1940, with smaller events felt in Bangor and Anglesey in 1967 and 1969. In the broader context of British seismicity, the 1984 Llŷn Peninsula earthquake was comparable to the 1896 Hereford earthquake, and its felt area exceeded that of the more damaging 1884 Colchester event.

The earthquake provided a rare opportunity to obtain accurate focal parameters for a major British earthquake, helping scientists better understand the deep structural geology and regional stress regimes in Britain. The depth of the earthquake suggested unusual crustal conditions in North Wales, with the brittle-ductile transition occurring much deeper than typically expected, possibly due to lower heat flow in the area.

== See also ==
- List of earthquakes in 1984
- List of earthquakes in the British Isles
