= James Yates (poet) =

English poet (fl. 1578–1582)

James Yates (fl. 1582), poet, describes himself in the dedication of his only known volume as a "serving man", and no further details of his biography have been discovered. Park conjectured that he came from Suffolk on the ground that "he addressed verses to 'Mr. P. W.' who visited Ipswich and wrote an epitaph on Mrs. Pooley of Badley.’ Mrs. Pooley was "sister to my lady Wentworth", who may have been one of the wives of Thomas, second baron Wentworth, though there were many knights in the Wentworth family. Most of them, however, belonged to Suffolk, and it is possible that "Mr. P. W." may have been Peter or Paul Wentworth. Yates has also been associated with Warwickshire on the grounds that he dedicates his work to one Henry Reynolds, who is assumed to be identical with Henry Reynolds, and that Drayton, who was a Warwickshire man, also dedicated his epistle "Of Poets and Poesie" to Reynolds. Upon this flimsy evidence is also based the theory that the "verses written at the departure of his friend W. S. when he went to dwell in London" included in Yates's volume refer to Shakespeare. It is more probable that Yates's patron was the Henry Reynolds of Belstead who married Elizabeth, daughter of Edmund Withipol of Ipswich, and that "Mr. P. W." was Edmund's brother, Paul Withipol (Davy, Suffolk Collections, vol. xciii. f. 341).

All Yates's poems are included in one volume, which was entered on the "Stationers' Register" on 7 June 1582 (Arber, Stationers' Reg. ii. 412), and published at London in the same year (black letter, 4to) "by John Wolfe, dwellinge in Distaffe lane, neere the signe of the Castle." The title is given by Corser as "The Castell of Courtesie. Whereunto is adioyned the Holde of Humilitie; with the Chariot of Chastitie thereunto annexed. Also a Dialogue between Age and Youth, and other matters herein conteined." In Collier's "Extracts from the Register of the Stationers' Company" (ii. 166) and in the Gentleman's Magazine (1840, i. 385) the order of the first two titles is reversed, and Collier states that the "Castell of Courtesie" is a "separate publication of which we have no copy nor any other record." This is apparently an error, for, though each of the three parts has a separate title-page, all three titles are given in the entry in the "Stationers' Register" of 7 June 1582. The volume is chiefly interesting by reason of its rarity; George Steevens possessed an imperfect copy which he believed to be unique, and refused on that account to lend to Park. This copy was eventually bought for 9l. by Heber, who secured another imperfect copy and from the two made up a complete copy, which is now at Britwell. Corser also possessed two imperfect copies, and these were bought at the sale of his books in 1871 by Mr. W. C. Hazlitt, who, however, was unable to make up a complete copy from them. No other copies are known to be extant. The poems included in the volume are distinguished more by their religious and moral tone than by any poetic excellence. Besides the extracts printed by Collier and in the Gentleman's Magazine (1840, i. 385–7), others are given in the "Shakespearean Repository" (ed. James Hamilton Fennell, January 1823), in "Select Poetry" (Parker Soc. ii. 450–1), and in Corser's "Collectanea Anglo-Poetica" (xi. 432–5).

== See also ==
- 1580 Dover Straits earthquake#Records
