= European Macroseismic Scale =

Earthquake intensity scale

The European Macroseismic Scale (EMS) is the basis for evaluation of seismic intensity in European countries and is also used in a number of countries outside Europe. Issued in 1998 as an update of the test version from 1992, the scale is referred to as EMS-98.

== Overview ==
The history of the EMS began in 1988 when the European Seismological Commission (ESC) decided to review and update the Medvedev–Sponheuer–Karnik scale (MSK-64), which was used in its basic form in Europe for almost a quarter of a century. After more than five years of intensive research and development and a four-year testing period, the new scale was officially released. In 1996, the XXV General Assembly of the ESC in Reykjavík passed a resolution recommending the adoption of the new scale by the member countries of the European Seismological Commission.

The European macroseismic scale EMS-98 is the first seismic intensity scale designed to encourage co-operation between engineers and seismologists, rather than being for use by seismologists alone. It comes with a detailed manual, which includes guidelines, illustrations, and application examples.

Unlike the seismic magnitude scales, which express the seismic energy released by an earthquake, EMS-98 intensity denotes how strongly an earthquake affects a specific place. The European macroseismic scale has 12 divisions, as follows:

I. Not felt	Not felt by anyone.
II. Scarcely felt	Vibration is felt only by individual people at rest in houses, especially on upper floors of buildings.
III. Weak	The vibration is weak and is felt indoors by a few people. People at rest feel swaying or light trembling. Noticeable shaking of many objects.
IV. Largely observed	The earthquake is felt indoors by many people, outdoors by few. A few people are awakened. The level of vibration is possibly frightening. Windows, doors and dishes rattle. Hanging objects swing. No damage to buildings.
V. Strong	The earthquake is felt indoors by most, outdoors by many. Many sleeping people awake. A few run outdoors. Entire sections of all buildings tremble. Most objects swing considerably. China and glasses clatter together. The vibration is strong. Top-heavy objects topple over. Doors and windows swing open or shut.
VI. Slightly damaging	Felt by everyone indoors and by many to most outdoors. Many people in buildings are frightened and run outdoors. Objects on walls fall. Slight damage to buildings; for example, fine cracks in plaster and small pieces of plaster fall.
VII. Damaging	Most people are frightened and run outdoors. Furniture is shifted and many objects fall from shelves. Many buildings suffer slight to moderate damage. Cracks in walls; partial collapse of chimneys.
VIII. Heavily damaging	Furniture may be overturned. Many to most buildings suffer damage: chimneys fall; large cracks appear in walls and a few buildings may partially collapse. Can be noticed by people driving cars.
IX. Destructive	Monuments and columns fall or are twisted. Many ordinary buildings partially collapse and a few collapse completely. Windows shatter.
X. Very destructive	Many buildings collapse. Cracks and landslides can be seen.
XI. Devastating	Most buildings collapse.
XII. Completely devastating	Almost all structures are destroyed. The ground changes.
With respect to the full version the given external link should be used.

== See also ==
- Seismic intensity scales
- Seismic magnitude scales
