= A607 road =

Road in England

A607

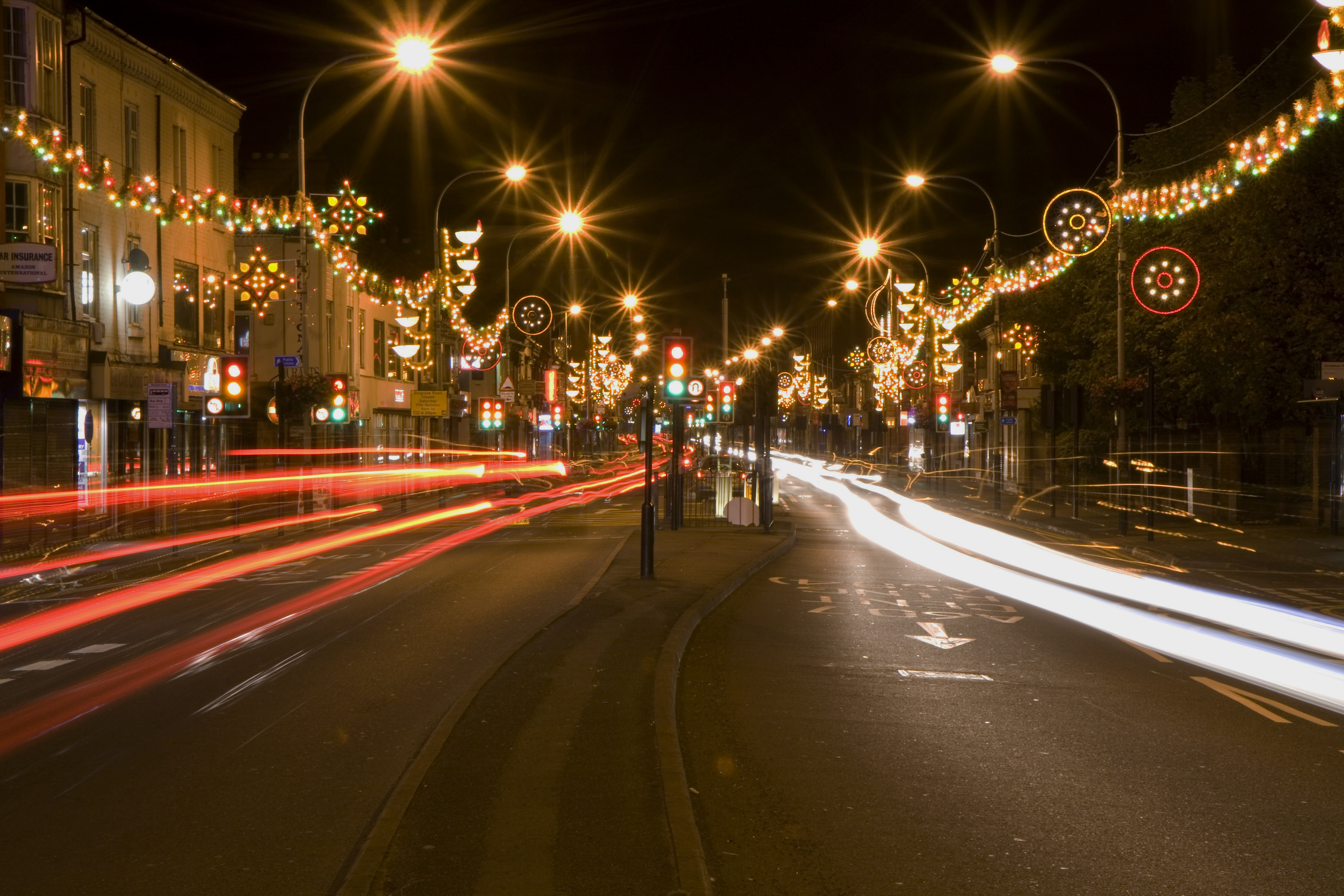
- The A607 at The Golden Mile in Belgrave, Leicester

Route information
- Length: 52.2 mi (84.0 km)

Major junctions
- South end: Belgrave, Leicester; 52.6415°N 1.1294°W
- North end: Bracebridge Heath; 53.1962°N 0.5347°W

Location
- Country: United Kingdom
- Primary destinations: Leicester; Melton Mowbray; Grantham

Road network
- Roads in the United Kingdom; Motorways; A and B road zones
← A606	→ A608

The A607 is an A road in England that starts in Belgrave, Leicester and heads northeastwards through Leicestershire and the town of Grantham, Lincolnshire, terminating at Bracebridge Heath, a village on the outskirts of Lincoln. It is a primary route from Thurmaston to the A1 junction at Grantham.

== Route ==
=== Leicester to Grantham ===
The road begins in Leicester on the A594 inner ring road from the Burleys Flyover intersection, near Thames Tower, as Belgrave Gate. The section of road was the A46, and also the A6. At Belgrave Circle (a grade separated junction – the Belgrave Flyover) it meets Abbey Park Road (B5327) north of the Murco Petroleum Ltd Flyover Filling Station and Leicester College's Abbey Park Campus at Painter Street, with the college's Technology and Engineering Centre to the east, next to the Bridle Lane Tavern. North of Belgrave Circle is Belgrave Road A.K.A the Golden Mile in Belgrave, Leicester, a notable road known for hosting the largest Diwali celebrations outside of India and for its large concentration of jewellers, restaurants and sari shops. The origin of the name of this stretch of the A607 is attributed to the many shops selling gold jewellery, said to be the largest selection outside India. The Road sells the most Gold in all of Europe.

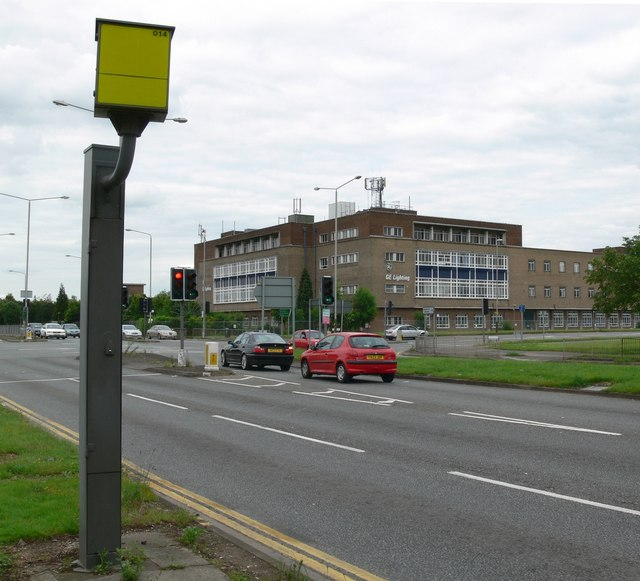
Former GE Lighting factory in Rushey Mead

At the end of this stretch of road Loughborough Road leaves to the left, which was the former A6. The road now becomes Melton Road and meets the former A6030 at a crossroads. On the corner of Sandringham Avenue there is the BP Sandringham Service Station on the left, and from here the road becomes a dual-carriageway. There is a roundabout with the Owl & Pussycat on the left. In Rushey Mead it passes Rushey Mead Academy on the right, and meets the A563 Leicester outer ring road (Troon Way) at the crossroads. The former site of the GE Lighting factory (closed in 2007 and originally British Thomson-Houston, then AEI), now occupied by a large Sainsbury’s supermarket is on the right.

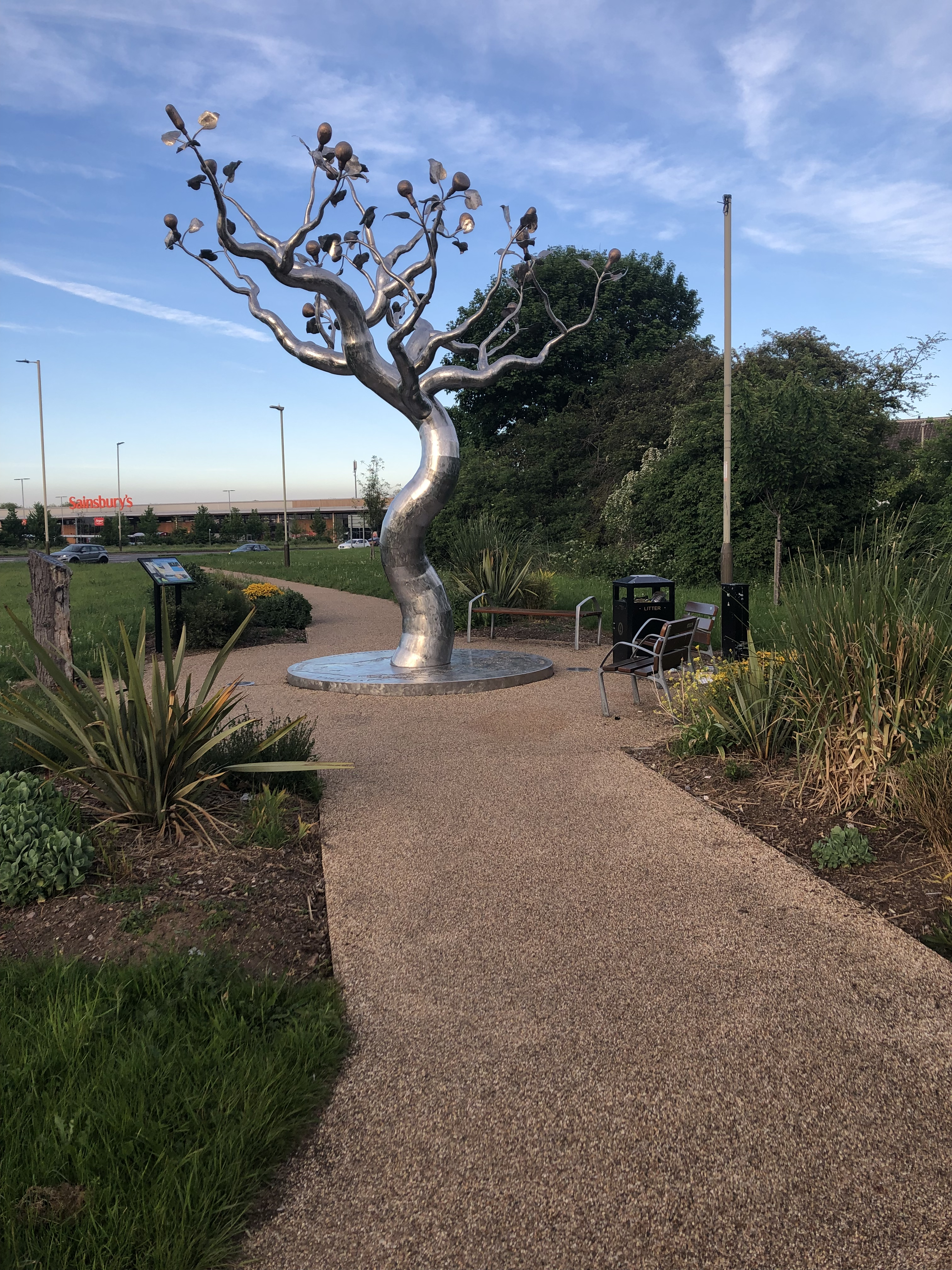
The World Tree on the south-eastern corner of the A563 Leicester outer ring road (Troon Way) at the crossroads in Rushey Mead

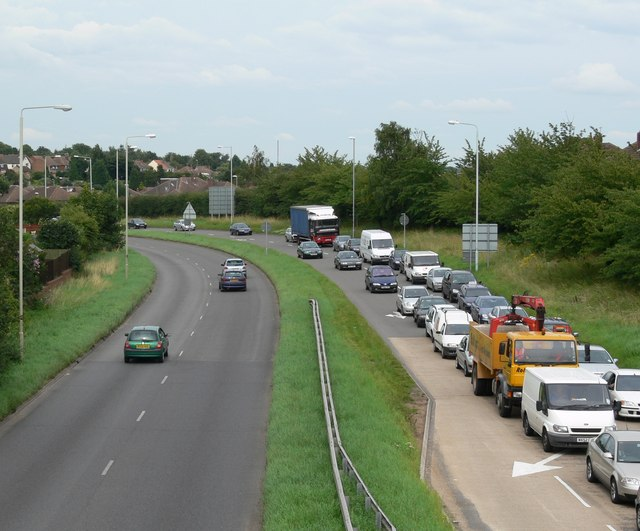
Newark Road - Thurmaston Bypass (former A46)

The road becomes a primary route, leaves the unitary authority of Leicester, and enters Leicestershire and the district of Charnwood. The road used to pass through the centre of Thurmaston, but there is now a bypass to the east (built as the A46) known as Newark Road, where the road leaves the route of the Fosse Way. At the large Thurmaston Roundabout with Barkby Thorpe Lane, there is a large Asda to the right, with a McDonald's, Pizza Hut and the Thurmaston Shopping Centre retail park. The Syston Bypass was originally built as the A46, before the Leicester Western Bypass was built in November 1995. Near The Roundhill Academy in Syston, the road used to diverge from the A46. The Syston bypass is quite some distance longer than driving through Syston itself. It passes the headquarters of Lafarge Cement UK on the right, and there is a left turn for the Watermead Country Park. At Syston, the road now meets with the Leicester Western Bypass (A46) at a roundabout, known locally as the Hobby Horse Roundabout which was widened in May 2006, where there is the Hobby Horse on the exit to the right, for Syston. At Cossington it crosses the Midland Main Line and leaves the A46 (Fosse Way) at an interchange in the parish of Ratcliffe on the Wreake. The Syston Northern Bypass opened in October 1992.

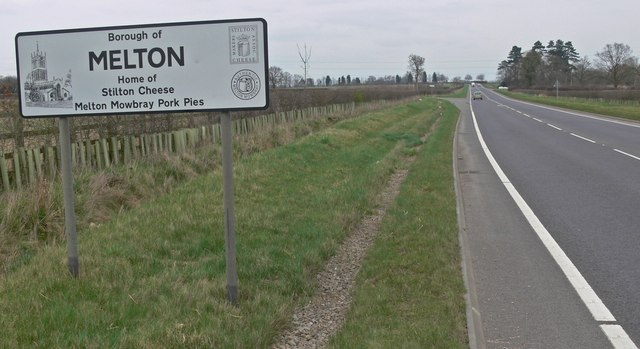
Entering the district of Melton at the end of the Rearsby bypass

There is a small roundabout as Cossington Lane with the former Fosse Way, and the road crosses the River Wreake then the Birmingham to Peterborough Line. It meets the former route (east of Syston) at the Queniborough Roundabout. The road used to pass through East Goscote and Rearsby (and access for the Beedles Lake Golf Centre), but is now bypassed to the east. The £7 million bypass was opened on 15 December 2004 by Charlotte Atkins, and construction had begun in April 2004. At the end of the bypass the road enters the district of Melton. There is a left turn for an agricultural college (Brooksby Melton College) at Hoby with Rotherby, where the road is crossed by the Midshires Way. The road is crossed by the Leicestershire Round at Frisby and Kirby. At Kirby Bellars it passes The Flying Childers, named after the Flying Childers race horse.

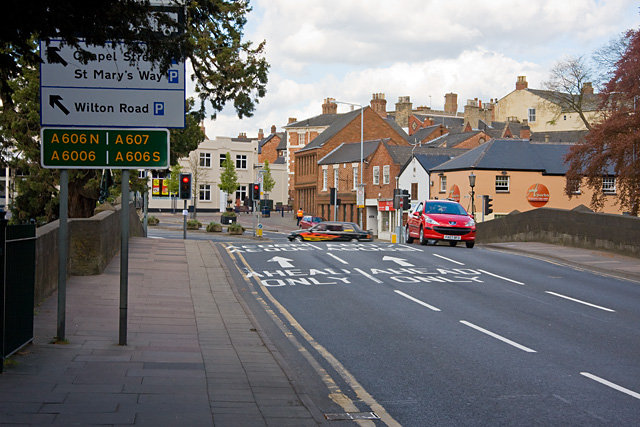
Crossing the River Eye in Melton Mowbray

Entering Melton Mowbray as Leicester Road, it passes the headquarters of Samworth Brothers on the Leicester Road Industrial Estate and crosses the former Northampton to Nottingham railway and then the Birmingham to Peterborough Line. It meets two roundabouts and passes Long Field Academy to the left. It meets Dalby Road (B6047, for Tilton on the Hill) to the right at the Total (former BP) Malthurst Egerton Park Filling Station, and crosses the two sections of the River Eye. It passes through the middle of Melton Mowbray and meets the A606 from the right. Opposite Brooksby Melton College, it meets the A6006 (for Loughborough) to the left, and the A606 exits straight ahead. It follows the exit to the right at the traffic lights crossroads and passes to the north of the town centre. At the traffic lights junction with the B676 (for Pedigree Petfoods), it leaves to the left, where it is crossed by the Jubilee Way. As Thorpe Road it passes the small Melton Mowbray Hospital on the right, near the B676 junction, and passes the JET Brobot Melton Mowbray garage and a Tesco on the right. It bends to the right, and the road ahead, Melton Spinney Road, is the exit for Twinlakes Theme Park (in the parish of Waltham and Thorpe Arnold).

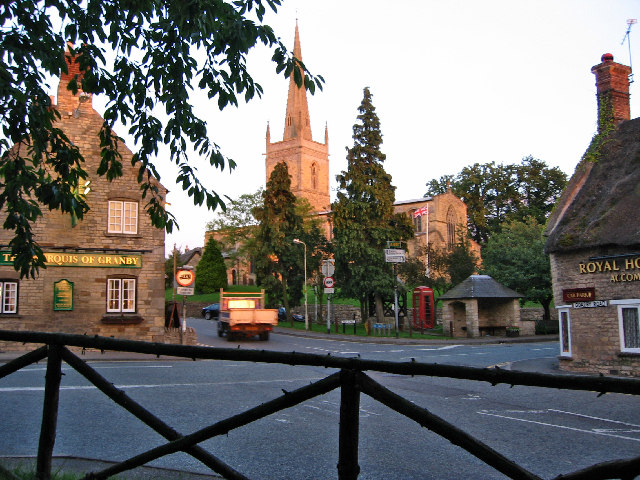
Waltham crossroads

In Thorpe Arnold (Waltham and Thorpe Arnold parish) it passes the church, then ascends the Leicestershire wolds, passing Melton Mowbray Golf Club on the right. The Waltham transmitting station dominates the view of the area to the right and is situated next door to the Waltham Centre for Pet Nutrition. At Waltham on the Wolds, it is crossed by the Mowbray Way, and the primary school is on the left. There is a crossroads next to St Mary Magdalene church, on the right. The Royal Horseshoes is on the left and the Marquis of Granby is on the right of the crossroads.

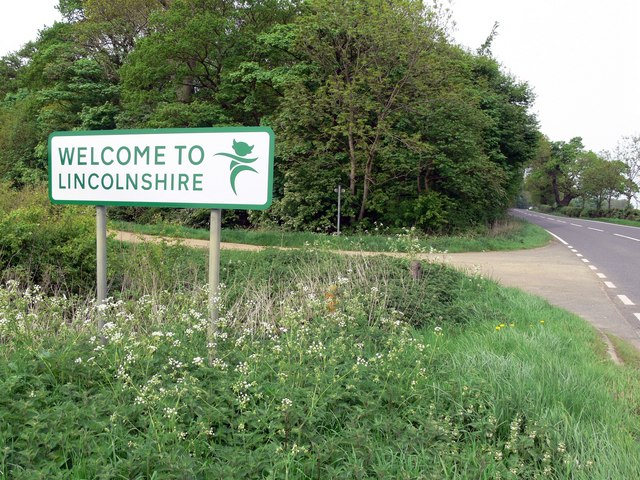
Entering Lincolnshire

In the parish of Croxton Kerrial at Lings Farm, it meets the Salters Way from the west – a Roman road along the top of the wolds from Six Hills, which eventually reaches Saltersford near Grantham. At this point, Lings Hill, the road is at its highest point of 173 metres. There is a right turn for Branston. In Croxton Kerrial, it passes the Peacock on the left, and there is a right turn for Knipton (and Belvoir Castle), and a left turn for Saltby. The road bends to the left and the Roman road carries straight on. The road is still on top of the wolds, and at Top Ash Plantation near Hill Top Farm, it meets the Viking Way (Sewstern Lane), and enters South Kesteven and Lincolnshire.

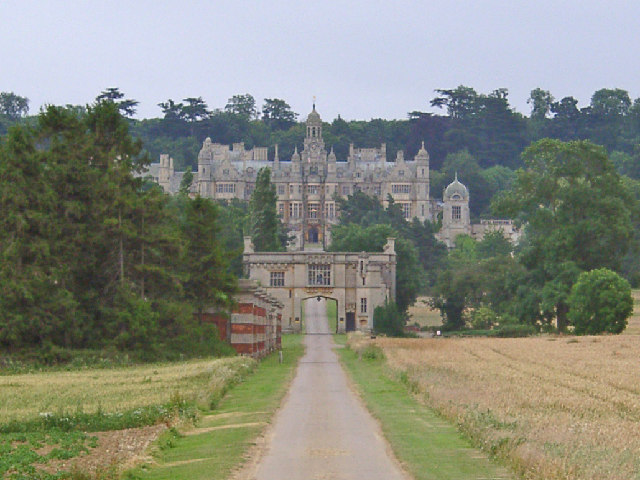
Harlaxton Manor

At this point, it descends from the top of the wolds down into Denton, which it passes to the south. It gently ascends a hill to reach Harlaxton. There is a crossroads, with the left exit for Barrowby. To the right is the entrance to Harlaxton Manor. It descends down the hill towards the A1 and the 400 kV pylon line. There is a roundabout for the northbound A1, where there is a Premier Inn, and the Farrier (Brewers Fayre) pub.

=== Grantham to Lincoln ===
This route follows broadly the former route of the Great Northern Railway Grantham to Lincoln line which had stations at Barkston, Honington, Caythorpe, Leadenham, Navenby, Harmston, Waddington and Bracebridge.

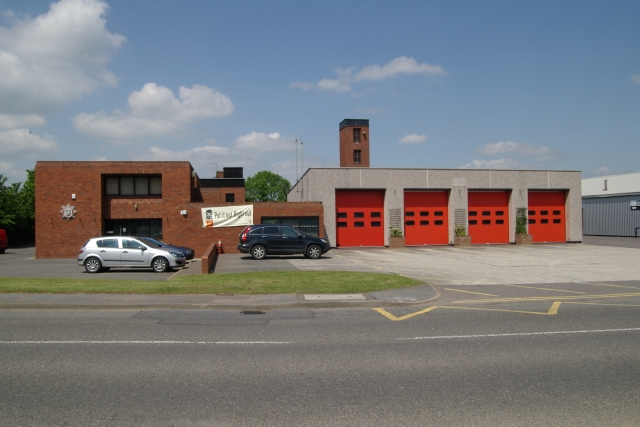
Grantham fire station on Harlaxton Road

The road passes under the A1 as Harlaxton Road, with the exit to the southbound A1 (for the Ramada Grantham and the former Fenland Foods), on the left where the road loses its primary route status. It passes close to Walton Academy, on the right. Grantham Fire Station is on the left, and at a cross roads with traffic lights it meets Trent Road, to the left, and Springfield Road, to the right. Springfield Road is a spur of the A607, and passes under the East Coast Main Line at a (13 ft – 3.8 m) low bridge, with single-lane access, to meet the A52. Both bridges are regularly hit by lorries, between 10 and 20 times a year. The main section of the road passes a large maltings and Grantham Magistrates' Court (now the main magistrates' court in south Lincolnshire) on the right, then the Huntingtower Arms, off Huntingtower Road. The BP Archways Service Station is on the left, and it passes under the ECML at the Harlaxton Road bridge (arched, 15 ft – 4.5 m at the centre – the highest clearance of the three low railway bridges for journeys across the town), meeting the A52 at the traffic lights (former roundabout) for Grantham railway station. The A607 from the A1 is the most popular, and quickest, route to the railway station.

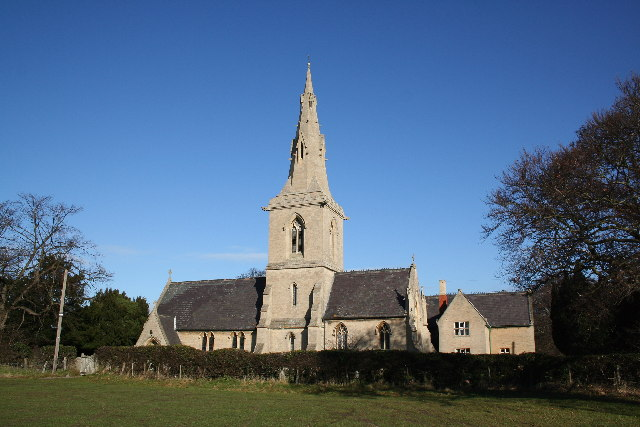
St John the Evangelist church in Manthorpe

The road follows the A52 on Sankt Augustin Way, following alongside the ECML. It used to follow Westgate into the Market Place. It passes Asda on the right and meets a small roundabout, taking the exit to the right. It crosses the former Great North Road, and on the corner is the former residence of Margaret Thatcher, Prime Minister from 1979 to 1990, now a chiropractic clinic. On the right hand side is The King's School, Grantham, and there is the JET Grantham Service Station on the right, followed by the Waggon & Horses. At this point, the road begins to follow the River Witham, which is to the east. It meets Belton Lane at traffic lights and Grantham and District Hospital is on the left which is near The Priory Ruskin Academy. Manthorpe Road passes through Manthorpe, and the St John the Evangelist church is on the left. There is a left turn for Great Gonerby.

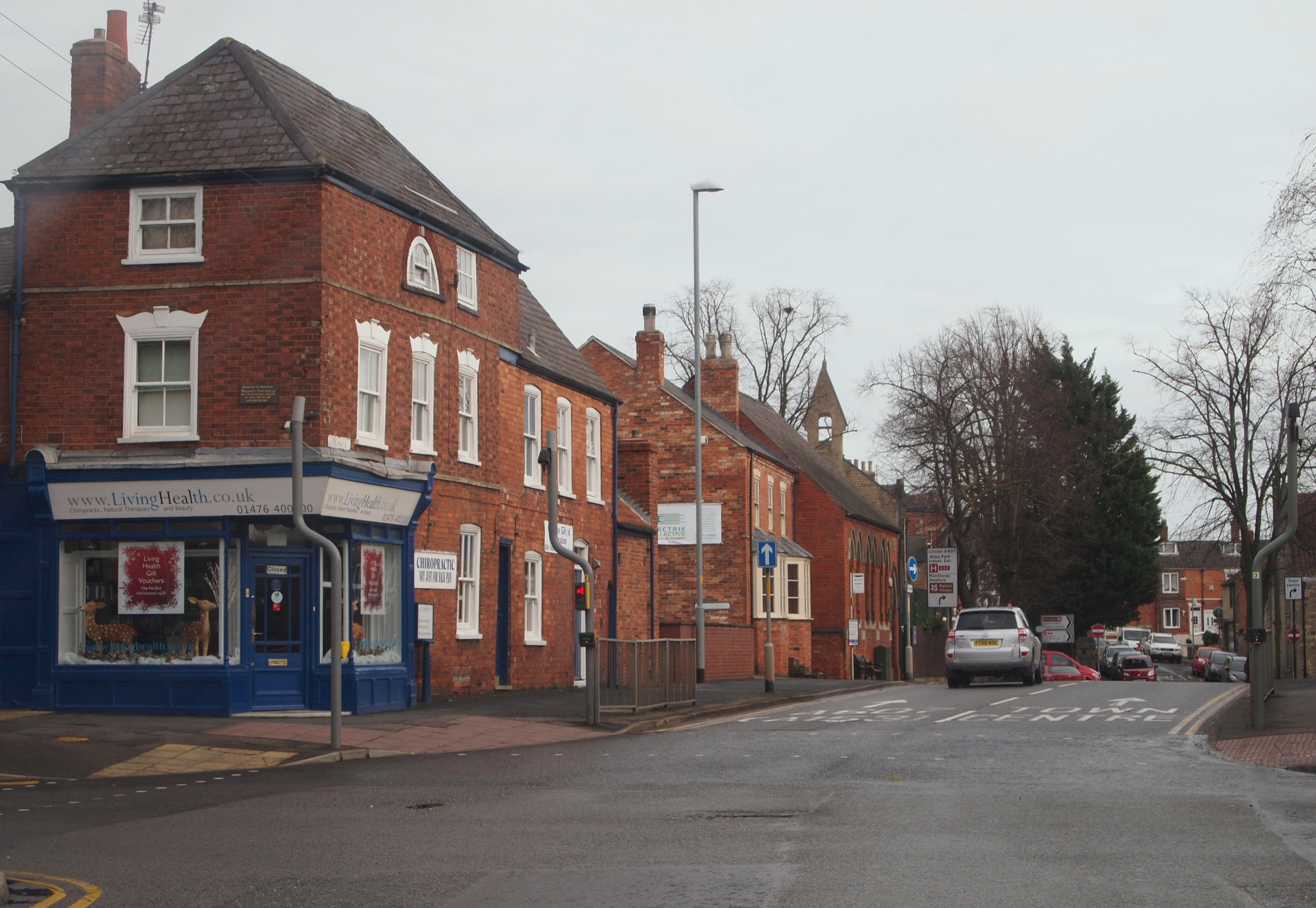
The birthplace of Margaret Thatcher

At Belton there is a left exit for the Belton Woods Hotel, country club, and golf course. The National Trust Belton House is to the east. The road used to pass through Belton, to the left but is bypassed. Syston is now bypassed to the east. The road takes a shorter route through Barkston, passing The Stag and the BP Barkston Service Station. The former route went past the primary school and church. At the Twelve Acre Plantation at Honington, the route leaves the main road to the left, which continues as the A153 (for Sleaford). It crosses the Grantham to Skegness Line at a level crossing. At Carlton Scroop the Viking Way follows the road from the church of St Nicholas, and passes over the former Grantham-Lincoln railway. Sudbrook Moor Golf Club is to the south, and in front is a BT transmitter on the southern beginnings of the Lincoln Cliff, which follows the road to Lincoln. The Viking Way leaves the road to the east, and the road passes through Normanton-on-Cliffe.

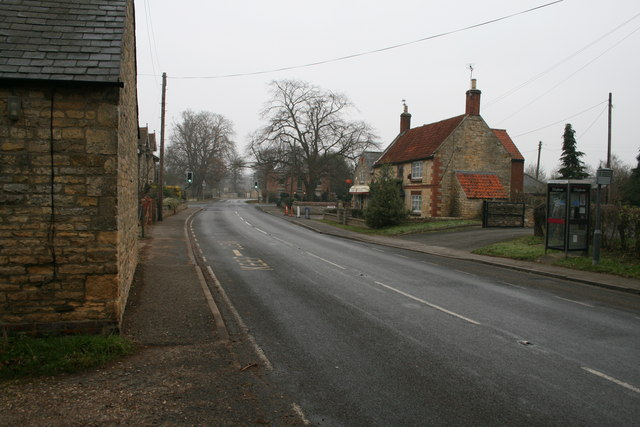
Leadenham

The former Grantham-Lincoln railway crosses the road at the point where it enters Frieston. The road passes to the west of Caythorpe on higher ground. On leaving Fulbeck, the road enters North Kesteven and passes over the A17 Leadenham bypass (built in March 1995). It passes the church of St Swithun, and there are traffic lights at crossroads where the road formerly met the A17. In the north of the village is the Total F Troop & Son garage. At Welbourn it crossed the former Grantham-Lincoln railway with the William Robertson school accessed to the right.

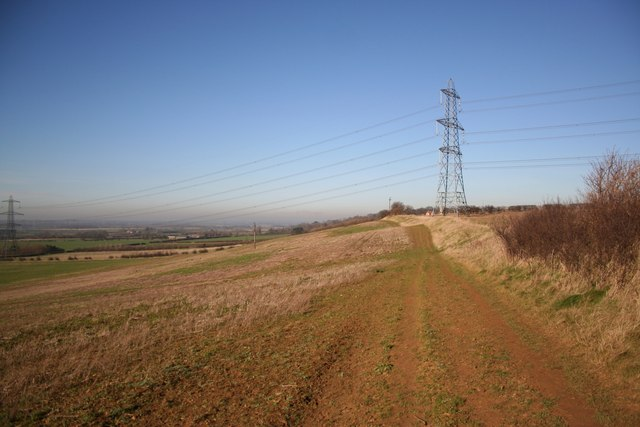
Lincoln Cliff between Boothby Graffoe and Coleby

Entering Wellingore the road ascends the Lincoln Cliff and the villages from here to Lincoln are known as the cliff villages. It passes All Saints Church and is crossed by the Viking Way. The villages of Wellingore and Navenby run into each other. The Viking Way follows the road, to the west, from here to Lincoln. At Boothby Graffoe the road passes St Andrews church and meets the B1202, for Metheringham to the east and is crossed by 400 kV pylons. It passes to the east of Coleby and at Harmston the road is briefly joined by the Viking Way and there is a crossroads with the B1178, to the east. RAF Waddington's airfield is nearby to the right. The road passes through Waddington, and bisects the older village to the left with the newer RAF housing to the right, passing the JET (former Texaco) Waddington Service Station. On the road to Bracebridge Heath, there are views from the limestone edge of North Hykeham to the west. Entering Bracebridge Heath as Grantham Road, it briefly follows the line of the former Roman road Ermine Street, passing the Total Bracebridge Heath Filling Station, then diverts to right, passing St John's church and meets the A15 at traffic lights and a T junction.

== History ==
=== Fosse Way ===
The road used to begin at the junction with the A46 (Fosse Way) in Syston.
