= Grantham and Lincoln railway line =

Railway line in Lincolnshire, England

The Grantham and Lincoln railway line was a line in Lincolnshire, built by the Great Northern Railway to shorten the distance between the town of Grantham and city of Lincoln. It had already formed a network in Lincolnshire, but the route from London and points south and west of Grantham was very indirect.

The line opened 1867, and was 18 miles in length, from Honington, near Grantham to Pelham Street Junction in Lincoln. Running through rural terrain, it was never heavily developed, and after nationalisation, through traffic was concentrated on a better alternative route via Newark. All local stations except Leadenham closed in 1962, and the line from Honington to Lincoln closed completely in 1965.

== Origins ==
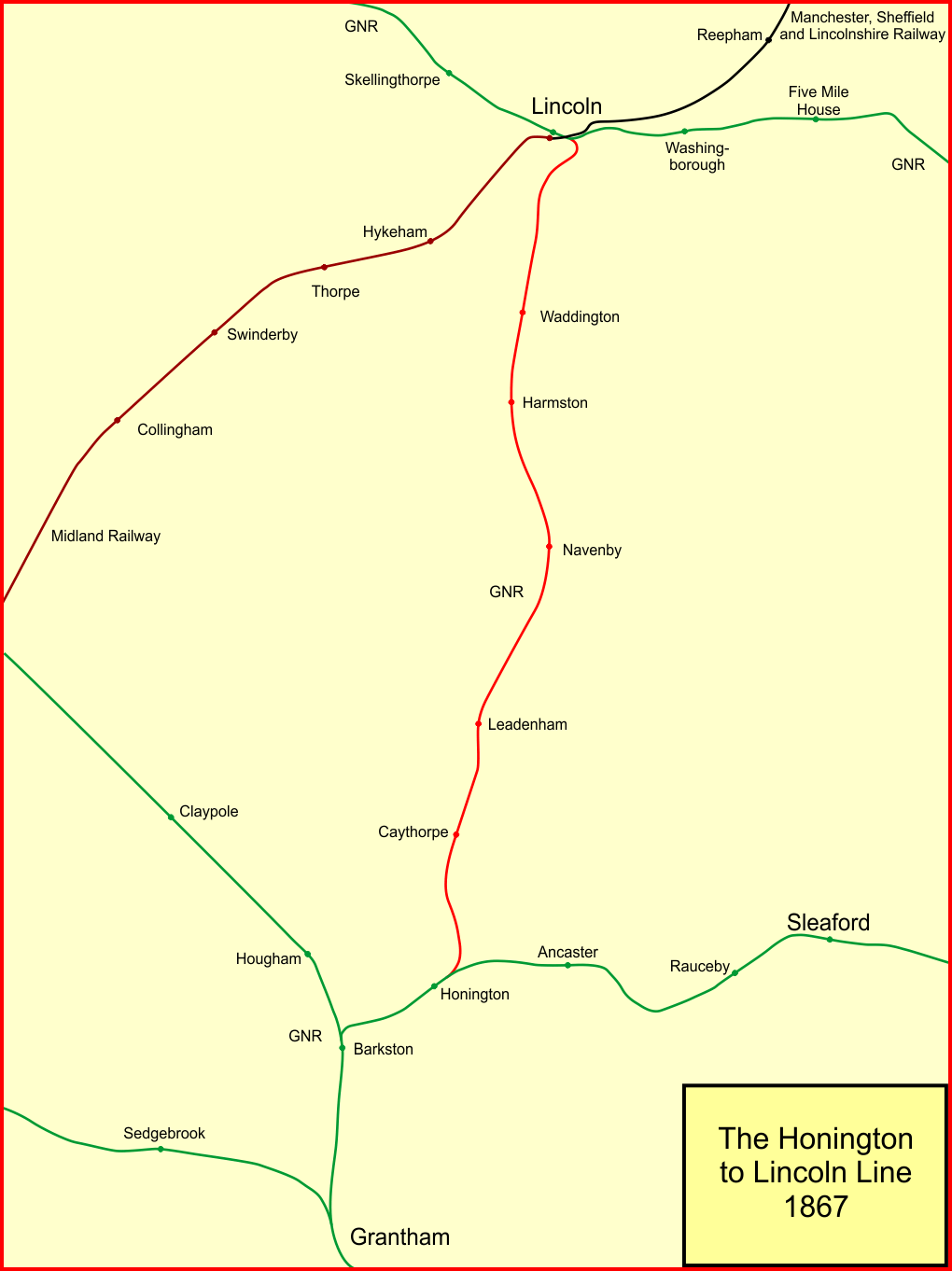
The Grantham and Lincoln railway line

In 1848 the Great Northern Railway opened part of its authorised network, from Peterborough to Lincoln via Spalding and Boston in 1848. The GNR called this the Loop Line, or the Lincolnshire Loop. In due course it opened its Towns Line, which eventually became part of the East Coast Main Line.

The Boston, Sleaford and Midland Counties Railway opened a railway line between Grantham and Boston, through Sleaford, providing an east–west line. It opened in two stages, in 1857 and 1859, and was worked by the GNR.

It became evident that the route from the south to Lincoln by way of Boston was rather roundabout, and the GNR gave thought to a shorter route. They were also concerned that the rival Great Eastern Railway sought to penetrate the area of Lincolnshire that the GNR dominated.

== Authorisation ==
Great Northern Railway (Lincoln to Bourn) Act 1864
- Act of Parliament
- Parliament of the United Kingdom
- Long title: An Act to enable the Great Northern Railway Company to extend their Railway from Lincoln to Sleaford; and to authorize the Amalgamation of the Boston, Sleaford, and Midland Counties Railway and the Bourn and Essendine Railway with the Great Northern Railway.
- Citation: 27 & 28 Vict. c. ccxlii

Dates
- Royal assent: 25 July 1864

Text of statute as originally enacted

A bill in the 1864 parliamentary session was for the railway, (Note: Great Northern Railway (No. 2) (Lincoln to Bourn) Bill. Note that the town of Bourne had the alternate spelling at that time.) in which the GNR sought powers for a line from a triangular junction at Honington to Lincoln, another from Sleaford to Bourne, and for absorption of the Boston, Sleaford and Midland Counties Railway, and the Bourn and Essendine Railway. The Sleaford—Bourn part of the proposal was rejected, but the remainder of the bill became the Great Northern Railway (Lincoln to Bourn) Act 1864 (27 & 28 Vict. c. ccxlii) on 25 July 1864, with new capital at £310,000 for the GNR.

== Opening ==
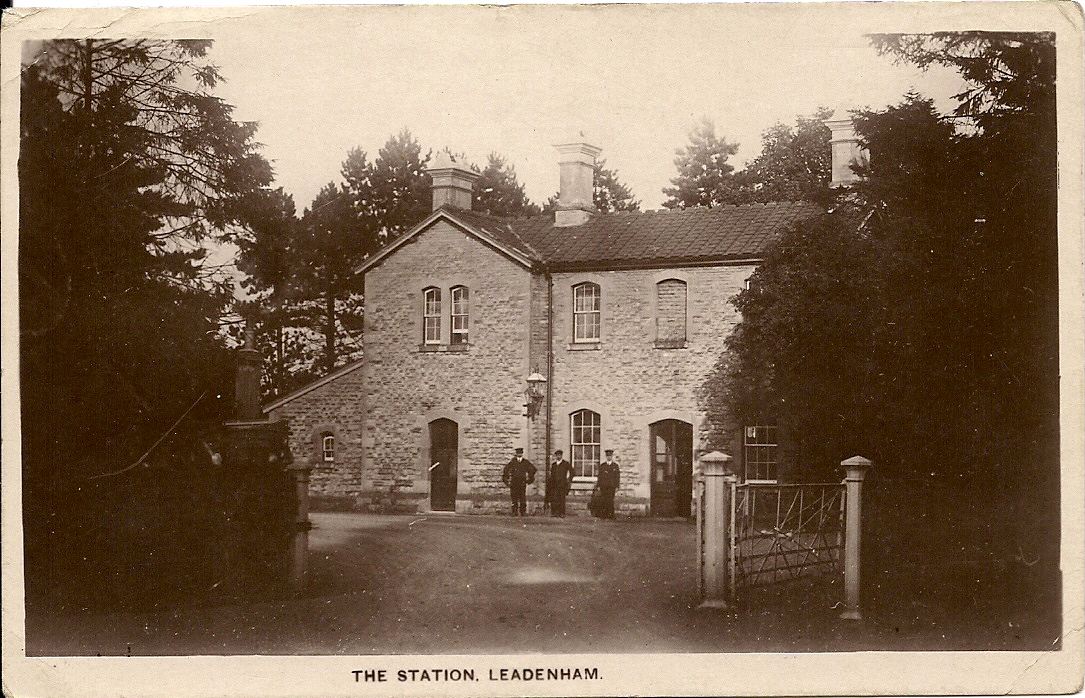
Leadenham railway station

The line between Honington and Lincoln was opened by the GNR on 15 April 1867. It was 18 miles 2 chains in extent and was constructed by Kirk & Parry for £121,533. There were stations at Caythorpe, Leadenham, Navenby, Harmston and Waddington, and the line joined the Lincolnshire Loop at Pelham Street junction, Lincoln. Board of Trade sanction was given for passenger opening, provided that a 5 mph speed limit was observed over Fulbeck bank where a slip was giving trouble, and on condition that all trains over Pelham Street crossing had a pilotman. Captain Tyler withdrew this condition on 2 August, as a satisfactory signalling and locking system had been installed there.

George Hussey Packe was chairman of the GNR and lived at Caythorpe Hall; he had the right to have any train stopped at Caythorpe. Construction of this branch involved provision of a new station at Honington, built slightly to the west of the old BS&MCR one, and with a refreshment room.

== Honington east curve ==
An east-to-north curve at Honington, for direct Sleaford-Lincoln running, was partly constructed. It appears doubtful if it was ever completed or used, and it was removed about 1882.

== Train service ==
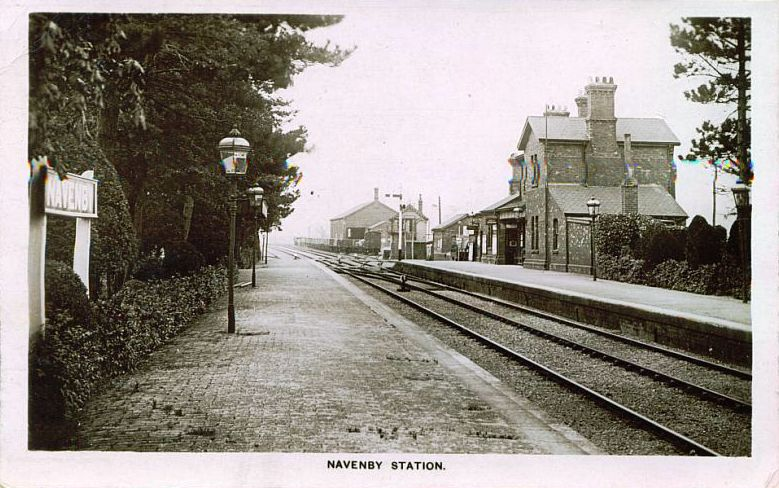
Navenby railway station

The passenger train service consisted of five trains each way on weekdays between Grantham and Lincoln and two on Sundays.

The new route cut three quarters of an hour off the journey time between Lincoln and London. By 1887 the train service had increased to nine each way, but only one each way on Sundays. In 1914 there were six weekday trains from Lincoln to Grantham, of which two, the 11.22 am and the 1.50 pm conveyed through carriages to London. From London through carriages ran on the 12.30 and 4.0 pm trains. In 1938 seven trains each way were normally run but only one conveyed through carriages to London. This was the 10.28 am from Lincoln to Grantham, where it was attached to the express from Newcastle due into Kings Cross at 1.15 pm. Return was by the 5.50 pm London to Yorkshire express, reaching Grantham at 7.55 pm. It left Grantham at 8.3 pm, called at Leadenham on request to set down passengers from London only, and was due into Lincoln at 8.37 pm. Not all trains stopped at all stations; usually one or two each way were Lincoln-Grantham direct to connect with main-line services. Most timetables show that if no scheduled stop was made at Leadenham, then some would stop to pick up or set down there if required.

== Block system ==
Preparations were made in 1878 for the block system of signalling on the Honington to Lincoln line. Temporary cabins were erected at the stations, later replaced by permanent boxes between 1880 and 1883. As part of the work, ironstone sidings and a signal box were brought into use at Frieston.

== Automatic train control system trial ==
In 1897 the line was used for an experiment with an early form of semi-automatic train control invented by Mr Wynford Brierly. A two-lever trip connected to a bell was placed beside the cab footstep on Stirling 2-2-2 no 6 and this contacted a rocker actuated by signal wire near the signals. When at danger the signal rocker engaged the lever on the locomotive, ringing a bell in the cab and displaying a red disc below it. Although the trial proved to be successful the system was never installed on the GNR.

== Bracebridge Gasworks Accident ==
There was a serious accident on the line on 25 January 1963, in which two drivers were killed. It took place at Bracebridge Gas Works, not far south of Lincoln. A steam locomotive carrying out shunting was standing on the down main line to allow an up train to pass. The signalman forgot about the engine and cleared his signals for a down train, which struck the engine at about 40 mph.

== Diesel trains ==
In the mid-1950s steam-hauled passenger trains were replaced with diesel multiple units on the line; it was one of the first routes on which this happened. Steam services were restored on some trains for a time in 1963 when Lincoln multiple units were taken temporarily to dieselise the Grantham to Nottingham service. The local goods trains remained steam hauled to the end.

== Decline and closure ==
In the 1960s the decline in local traffic could not be ignored, and all the stations on the line except Leadenham were closed to passenger traffic. Some retained their goods facilities for the time being, although Harmston closed completely. Two years later, on 15 June 1964, all stations lost their goods services other than for coal, at the time still an important resource. In 1965 Leadenham yard looked busier than it had done for many years when truckloads of steel were delivered for the construction of electricity pylons in the area.

However complete closure was inevitable, and on 1 November 1965 the line closed completely between Honington and Lincoln, and through trains were diverted via Newark. For a short time afterwards, one mile of track was retained northwards from Honington Junction and used for redundant wagon storage, and until 7 December 1970 the short section from Lincoln to the Gas Works was in use.

== Station list ==
- Grantham; main line station.
- Barkston; Boston, Sleaford and Midland Junction Railway station;
- Honington; Boston, Sleaford and Midland Junction Railway station;
- Caythorpe; opened 15 April 1867; closed 10 September 1962;
- Leadenham; opened 15 April 1867; closed 1 November 1965;
- Navenby; opened 15 April 1867; closed 10 September 1962;
- Harmston; opened 15 April 1867; closed 10 September 1962;
- Waddington; opened 15 April 1867; closed 10 September 1962;
- Pelham Street junction;
- Lincoln; main line station.

== See also ==
Lincolnshire lines of the Great Northern Railway
