= Honington railway station =

Former railway station in Lincolnshire, England

Coordinates: 52.9816°N 0.5998°W

Honington
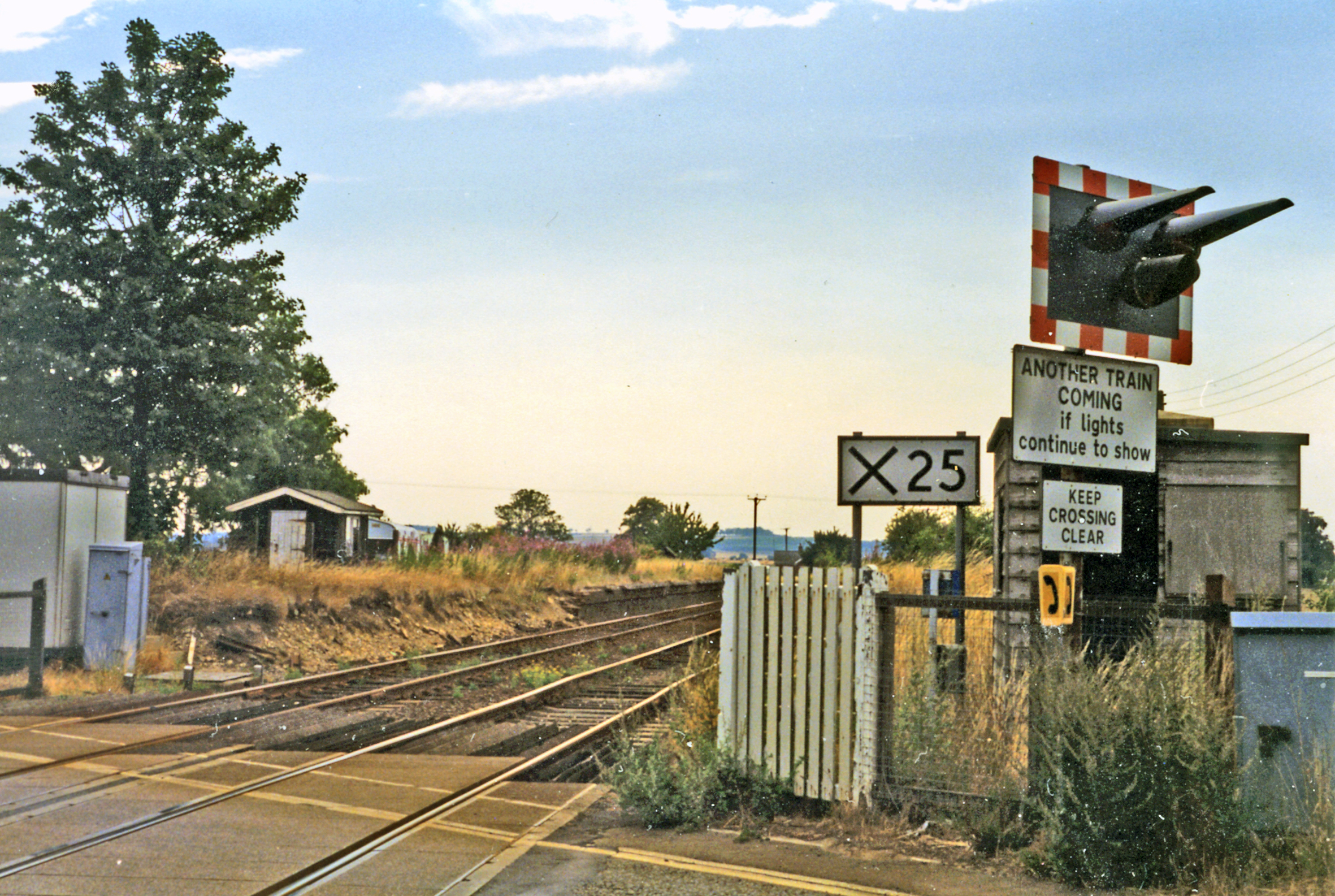
- Site of the station in 1995

General information
- Location: Honington, South Kesteven; England
- Platforms: 2

Other information
- Status: Disused

History
- Original company: Boston, Sleaford and Midland Counties Railway
- Pre-grouping: Great Northern Railway
- Post-grouping: London and North Eastern Railway

Key dates
- 1 July 1857: Opened
- 10 September 1962: Closed for regular passenger service
- 27 April 1964: closed for freight traffic
- 1965: closed completely
Location

Honington railway station was a station in the village of Honington, Lincolnshire. It was located on junction with the line Grantham and Lincoln railway line and Grantham to Sleaford and Skegness It was closed for regular services on 10 September 1962 but was used occasionally until 1965. The disused platforms are still in situ.

Preceding station	Disused railways	Following station
Barkston; Line and station closed	Great Northern Railway; Grantham to Boston Line	Ancaster; Line and station open
Barkston; Line and station closed	Great Northern Railway; Grantham and Lincoln railway line	Caythorpe; Line and station closed
