= Lincolnshire lines of the Great Northern Railway =

The Lincolnshire lines of the Great Northern Railway are the railways, past and present, in the English county built or operated by the Great Northern Railway.

The Great Northern Railway was authorised in 1846 and was to build from London to York via Newark and also a "Loop Line" via Lincoln. The GNR leased and operated the East Lincolnshire Railway. The construction proceeded in stages, and the line from Peterborough through Boston to Lincoln opened in 1848. The East Lincolnshire Railway from Boston to Grimsby opened in the same year.

Gradually the GNR filled in the space between the Loop Line and the coast. East-west connections were developed, and holiday and excursion traffic proved a huge development. The haulage of coal from the Nottinghamshire and Yorkshire coalfields to London and East Anglia was a lucrative traffic. There was relatively little competition from rival railways in the area, and the network as a whole was successful. However the rural character of many of the lines meant that commercially they were of limited success.

In 1879 the GNR had to concede the construction of a joint railway with the Great Eastern Railway, which abstracted considerable revenue from the mineral traffic income. After about 1965 many of the lines declined substantially, and in 1970 a widespread closure took place, leaving only key routes from the former GNR network.

== Origins to authorisation ==
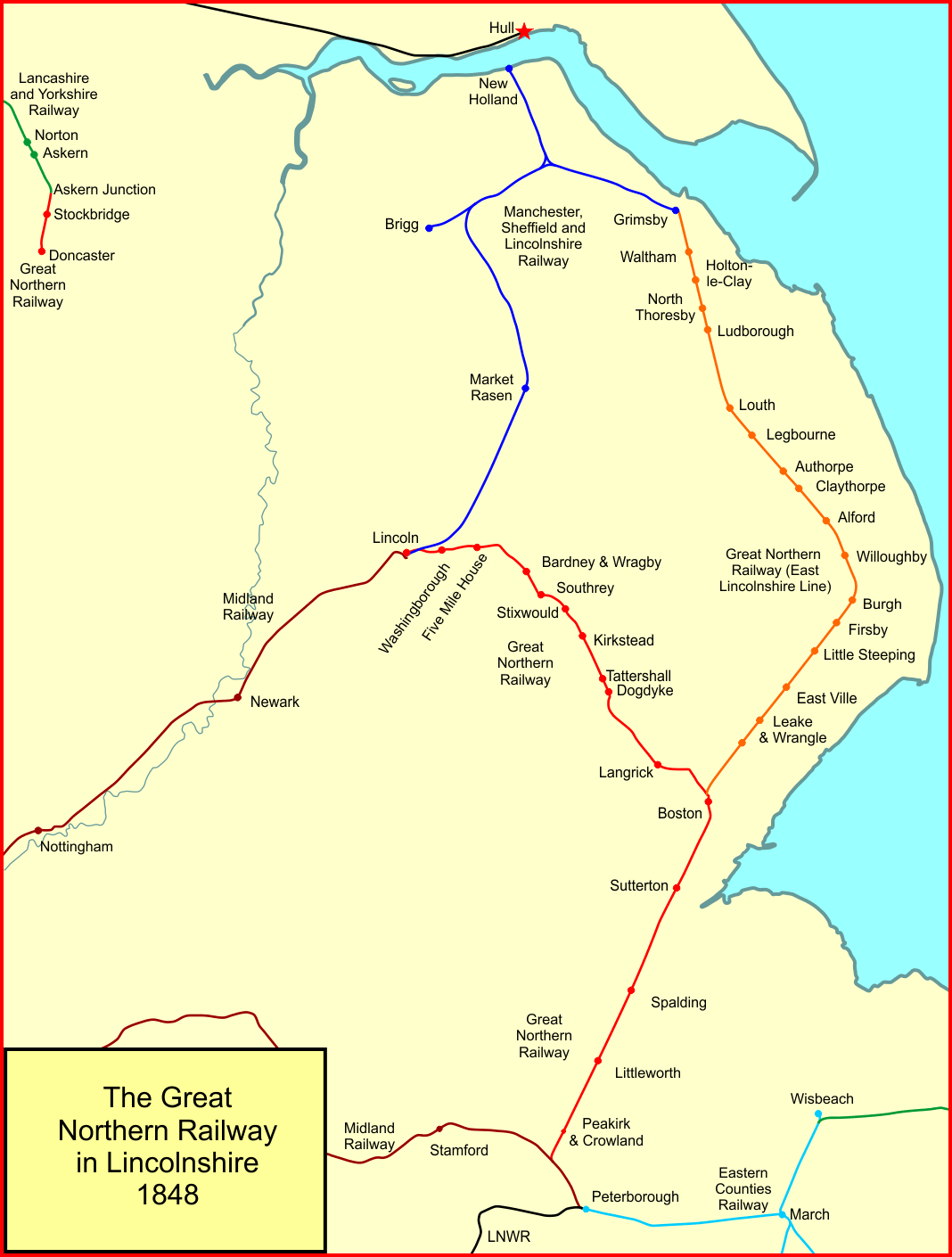
The Great Northern Railway in Lincolnshire in 1848

After the commercial success of the Liverpool and Manchester Railway (opened 1830), a number of schemes were promoted for longer distance railways. The Railway Mania took hold, and a huge number of railway projects were promoted, in many cases with little care in design, and investors scrambled to subscribe to them, hoping to make a quick fortune. In 1844 the London and York Railway was proposed; it met with fierce opposition: from the railways controlled by George Hudson, which already provided a railway connection to the north of England, and from rival schemes.

The extent of the proposed London and York undertaking dwarfed that of any railway project in this country before or since: a "leviathan undertaking". The deposited plans consisted of:

- The main line, London to York: 186 miles;
- A loop line off the main line, from Peterborough to Bawtry via Boston and Lincoln: 86 miles;
- A branch from Bawtry to Sheffield: 20 3/4 miles; and
- A branch from Doncaster to Wakefield: 20 1/4 miles.

In the 1846 session of Parliament, the London and York Railway was successful in gaining authorisation, in the Great Northern Railway Act 1846 (9 & 10 Vict. c. lxxi) passed on 26 June; it changed its title in the process to the Great Northern Railway. However the Bawtry to Sheffield branch was rejected, in favour of a rival scheme, the Sheffield and Lincolnshire Junction Railway. The Wakefield branch too was lost, but a line from Askern (north of Doncaster) to Methley (near Leeds) was authorised to the Great Northern's ally, the Manchester and Leeds Railway.

== East Lincolnshire Railway ==
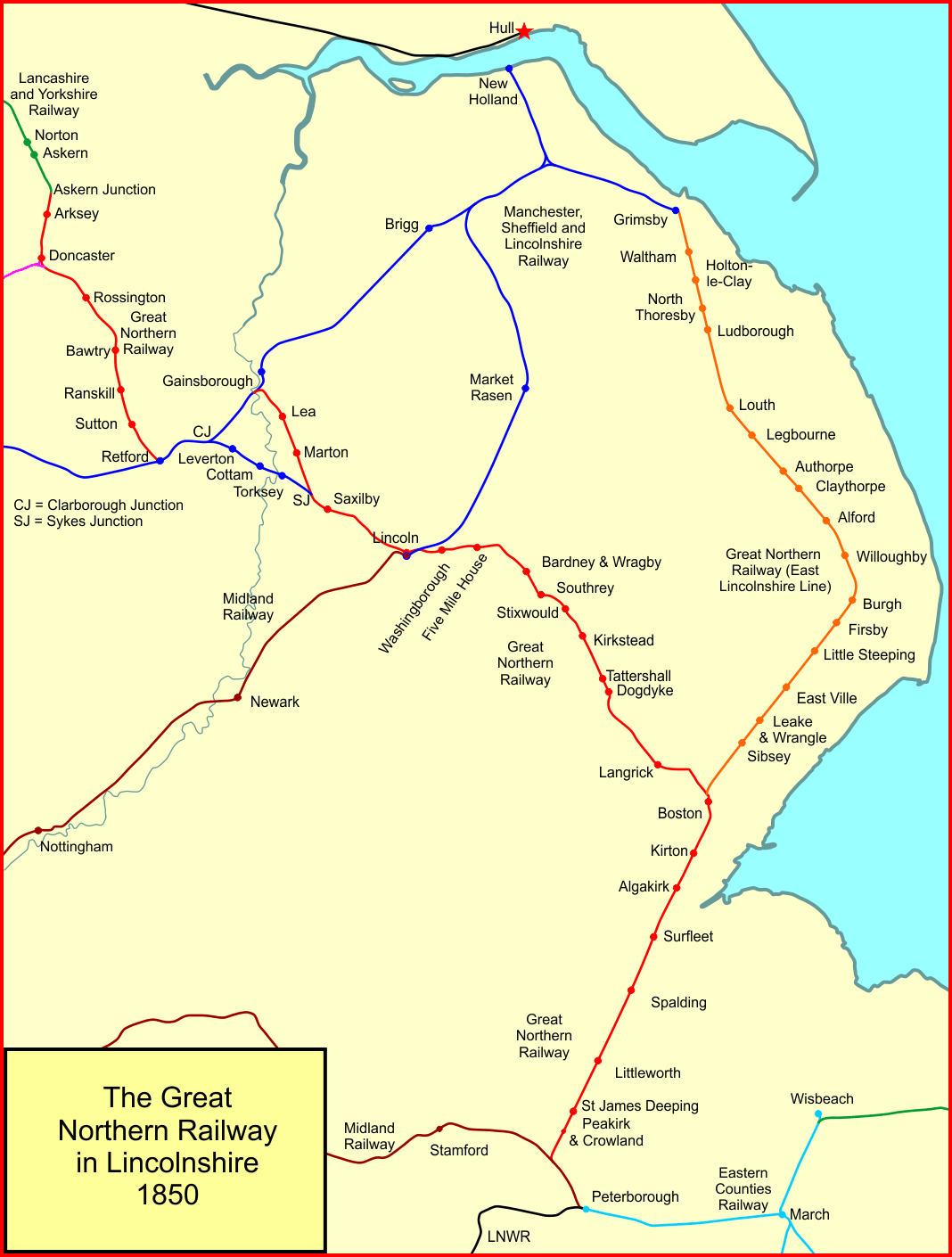
The gNR lines in 1850

The East Lincolnshire Railway was authorised on the same day as the Great Northern Railway in 1846. It was to be an independent railway from Boston to Grimsby via Louth. The directors of the GNR immediately arranged to lease the ELR; in doing so they secured nearly all of Lincolnshire into their control. "Somewhat improvidently" the ELR proprietors were guaranteed a permanent 6% lease rental. The lease of an unbuilt railway was feasible, because the lease payment was to be 6% of the paid-up capital, which was minimal at first. The promoters of the East Lincolnshire Railway had intended that their Boston terminus should be on the Haven bank at the end of Pulvertoft Lane but, under pressure from Boston Town Council during the passage of their bill through Parliament, they decided to use the GNR's station in the town.

Having taken control, the GNR now managed the construction of the East Lincolnshire Line. The East Lincolnshire Railway Company remained in existence, handling the lease charge and dividend payments, but now took a back seat. It was still in existence at the grouping of the railways in 1923 following the Railways Act 1921.

== Taking stock ==
The board were elated to have secured authorisation of their line, and reviewed what should be done in the light of the loss of the Sheffield branch. The GNR's authorised line was from London to York, dividing into two routes between Peterborough and Bawtry: a direct line through Grantham, Newark and Retford, (which soon became known as the "Towns Line",) and a roundabout route via Spalding, Boston and Lincoln (which was called the "Loop Line"). They converged at Bawtry because the intended GNR Sheffield branch was to connect there, but that had been cut out of the authorisation, and the Sheffield and Lincolnshire Junction Railway was authorised to make a similar line.

The board decided that the Loop Line should join the Towns Line further north, at Rossington, a few miles south of Doncaster. In 1847 a parliamentary bill was submitted to authorise the necessary line from Gainsborough to Rossington, but it was rejected in Parliament.

== Construction and first openings ==
Faced with 319 miles of railway (Note: London to York 186 miles; Loop Line 86 miles; East Lincolnshire Line 47 miles.) to construct, the board decided to prioritise on construction of the Loop Line and the East Lincolnshire Line, as they presented easier technical challenges.

In fact the first part of the network to open was on the East Lincolnshire Line, from Louth to Grimsby; it opened on 1 March 1848. On the same day the Manchester, Sheffield and Lincolnshire Railway opened its line from Brigg and New Holland to Grimsby. New Holland gave access by ferry to Kingston upon Hull. The Great Northern Railway worked the trains on the East Lincolnshire Line, and it was agreed with the MS&LR that each company's trains would operate throughout between New Holland and Louth. The East Lincolnshire Railway had originally planned a separate station, but it had been agreed that the GNR would use the MS&LR station.

This opening was followed by the section from Louth to Firsby (Note: Wrottesley says that Firsby was spelt Firstby at the time, but it is impossible to corroborate that. Ludlam repeats it, but that is merely derivative. Allen, writing a geographical history in 1834, consistently used Firsby, and it seems likely that the variant spelling is a transcription error by Wrottesley.) on 3 September 1848. The final stage was opened on 2 October 1848 (Note: Date from Wrottesley. Grinling and Ludlam say 1 October, but that was a Sunday.) from Firsby to a temporary station at Boston.

The East Lincolnshire Line was complete.

== Construction of the Loop Line to Lincoln ==
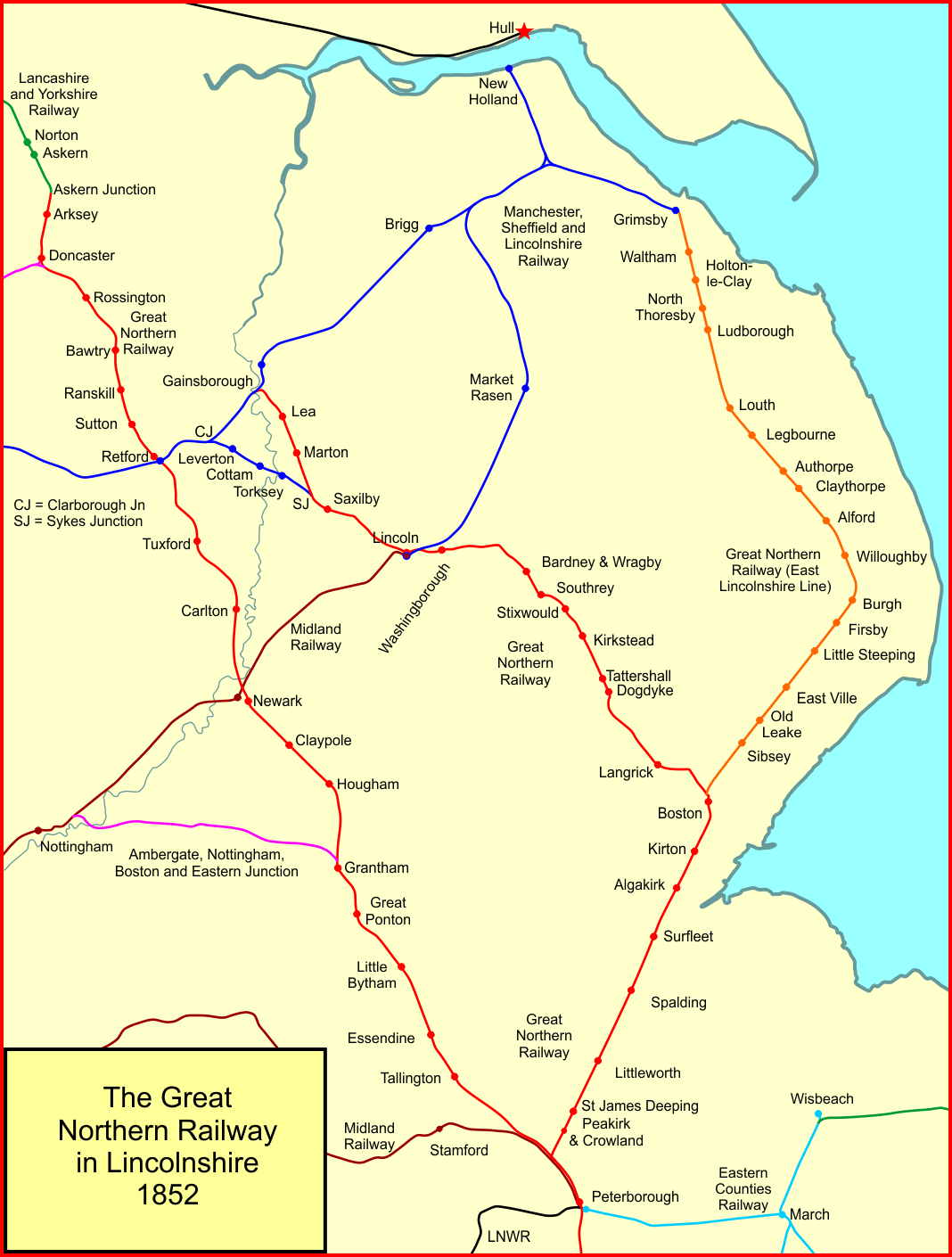
The GNR in 1852

So far as the GNR's own network was concerned, the directors had decided to concentrate on construction of the Loop Line, as that was technically simpler than other areas. A large section of the GNR Loop Line was soon ready, and 58 miles from Walton Junction (near Peterborough) to Lincoln via Boston opened on 17 October 1848. GNR trains reached Peterborough over the Midland Railway's line, and passengers and goods could reach London from Peterborough over the Eastern Counties Railway or the London and North Western Railway. The GNR Lincolnshire Loop was alongside the Midland Railway at the present-day Werrington Junction. It is likely the temporary connection was made there. There was no community named Werrington at the time, and Walton was the nearest identifiable settlement. The GNR provided a temporary engine shed at "Walton" so evidently the Midland Railway hauled the GNR trains to and from Peterborough,

Near the Grand Sluice at Boston, the East Lincolnshire Line and the Loop Line converged, and passed awkwardly as a single line between Witham Town and the River Witham. The GNR obtained the Great Northern Railway Amendment Act 1849 (12 & 13 Vict. c. lxxxiv) on 1 August 1849, for a deviation at Boston by-passing the single line section, and enlargement of the stations at Boston and Lincoln. The Boston deviation, consisting of 52 chains of double track including 13 chains on the East Lincolnshire Line was commissioned on Sunday 11 May 1850, making the Loop and East Lincolnshire Line double throughout.

For a while the steam packets on the River Witham continued to operate between Boston and Lincoln, and the railway introduced a fourth class at a very low fare of a halfpenny a mile. The steam packets did not give up the fight until 1861.

== Lincoln northwards ==
The original intention had been to build from Lincoln to Bawtry, via Gainsborough. At Bawtry the Loop Line was to join the Towns Line, and there would also be a branch from Bawtry to Sheffield. However the Sheffield branch had been thrown out by Parliament in 1846. The Board had considered what to do and they decided that it would be better if the Loop Line continued from Gainsborough to join the Towns Line further north, at Rossington, a few miles south of Doncaster. This required a fresh act of Parliament, but this too was thrown out in 1847, and again the following year. With construction progressing, it was becoming urgent to find a way of connecting the north end of the Loop Line. The MS&LR had powers to build a line that would shorten the route between Lincoln and Retford. This had been authorised in the Sheffield and Lincolnshire Extension Railway Act 1846 (9 & 10 Vict. c. cccxix), which was then amalgamated with others to form the Manchester, Sheffield and Lincolnshire Railway. The GNR asked the MS&LR to commence construction of this line. Although the MS&LR had shelved the project, it proved very co-operative and ordered its construction. The line was 8 miles long, and became known as the "Leverton Branch".

Meanwhile the Lincoln to Gainsborough section of the Loop Line was ready. Captain Wynne of the Board of Trade inspected the line on 29 March 1849, but refused permission to open until signals were provided at the swing bridge at Brayford Mere (Lincoln). They were duly provided, and the line was opened on 9 April 1849. The route made a junction with the Manchester, Sheffield and Lincolnshire Railway at Gainsborough; GNR trains reversed at the junction and used the MS&LR station at Gainsborough. At this stage the MS&LR line did not yet cross the River Trent; the two routes converged and ended together at the river bank. From 17 July 1849 the MS&LR crossed the Trent and ran through to Sheffield via Retford and Worksop.

== Reaching Retford, Sheffield and Doncaster ==
The Towns Line had not been neglected: the section from Retford to Doncaster opened on Tuesday 4 September 1849. It made a junction at Retford with the MS&LR route from Lincoln. This enabled the GNR to run trains from Peterborough to Leeds, via Boston, Lincoln and Gainsborough, then over the MS&LR to Retford, and thence on its own line northwards, using running powers and agreements to reach Leeds from there. In May 1850 the GNR understood that the Leverton branch was ready, and published an intended opening date for its own services of 1 July 1850. However the MS&LR, previously co-operative, physically blocked the line on that day, and the GNR had to continue to send its traffic round via Gainsborough. The GNR intended to run trains to Sheffield, for which it had running powers, and the MS&LR could run to Lincoln. The argument seems to have been resolved, resulting in the Leverton Branch being used from 7 August 1850. This shortened the route to Leeds, as well as enabling the Sheffield service.

The matter looked different from the MS&LR point of view:

The Leverton line was fit to carry goods traffic (but not passenger traffic owing to the absence of signalling) and on 26th January Allport [General Manager of the MS&LR] was instructed to start working goods trains over it. But the Great Northern thwarted this by refusing to allow MS&L trains to pass between Sykes Junction and Lincoln. The line was eventually opened on 7th August, when the Great Northern, adopting a more reasonable attitude, made use of it to introduce a through service between Doncaster and Lincoln via Retford. The GNR was reconsidering the northern part of the route to York, and on 6 June 1850 it agreed with the York and North Midland Railway to use that company's line from Knottingley to York, and to abandon the GNR's plans for its own line to York.

== Towns line opened ==
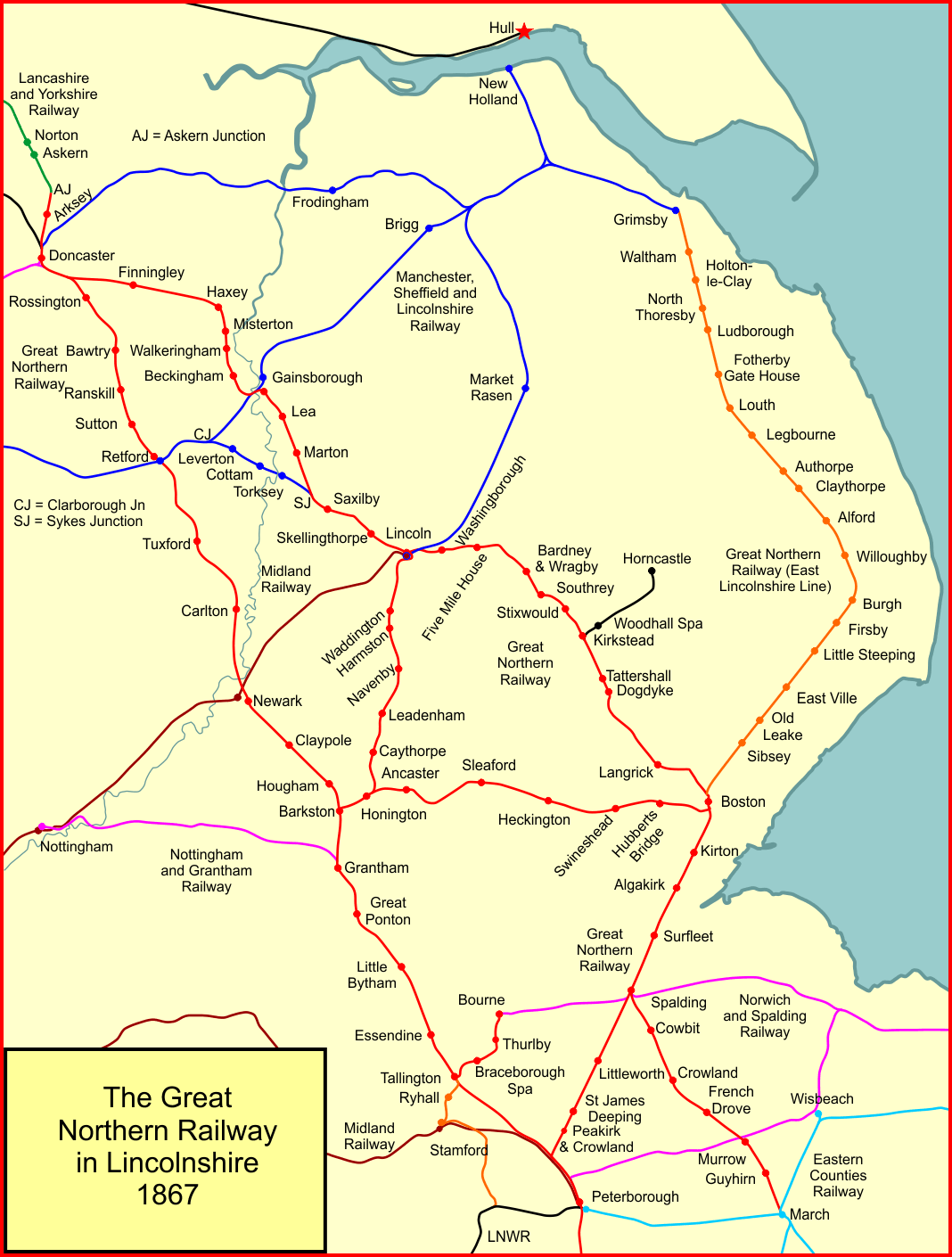
The GNR in 1867

On 7 August 1850 the GNR opened the southern end of its line from Peterborough to London. On 15 July 1852 the rest of the Towns Line opened to goods, and on 1 August 1852 to all traffic. Through trains to the north were transferred to the Towns Line. This meant that as soon as Kings Cross station opened fully on 14 October 1852 the entire network as originally authorised in 1846 was open, with the exception of the Gainsborough to Bawtry section, which had been abandoned. The approval of a Gainsborough to Rossington line remained to be secured.

== Grimsby Fish Dock co-operation ==
The MS&LR formed a subsidiary in 1854 to build and operate a fish dock at Grimsby, in collaboration with the Midland Railway and the GNR: the Grimsby Deep Sea Fishing Company was formed and several vessels were purchased. The dock was equipped with an icehouse, and fishermen's cottages were built. After two years, each of the three companies had lost about £2,000, and in 1858 the GNR board recommended that the company be wound up and the vessels and plant sold.

== Consolidation ==
Having built the authorised lines, the GNR did not at first seek to build new lines within Lincolnshire, and was reluctant to assist independent lines.

== Essendine railways ==
The independent Stamford and Essendine Railway opened in 1856. Stamford was an important town, but it already had a Midland Railway connection, and the new route requiring a change of trains at Essendine was unpopular. The associated Bourn and Essendine Railway opened in 1860. In an effort to encourage traffic the Stamford and Essendine company extended southwards to Wansford, opening in 1867. These lines were worked by the GNR, and later acquired by the company, but they were both commercially unsuccessful.

== Boston, Sleaford and Midland Counties Railway ==
The Boston, Sleaford and Midland Counties Railway opened between Grantham and Boston through Sleaford, in two stages, in 1857 and 1859. Coupled with the Ambergate, Nottingham, Boston and Eastern Junction Railway which had opened in 1850 and connected Nottingham to Grantham, the line provided an important west to east route, connecting the East Midlands to the east coast of Lincolnshire. Both lines were worked by the GNR.

== Gainsborough to Doncaster ==
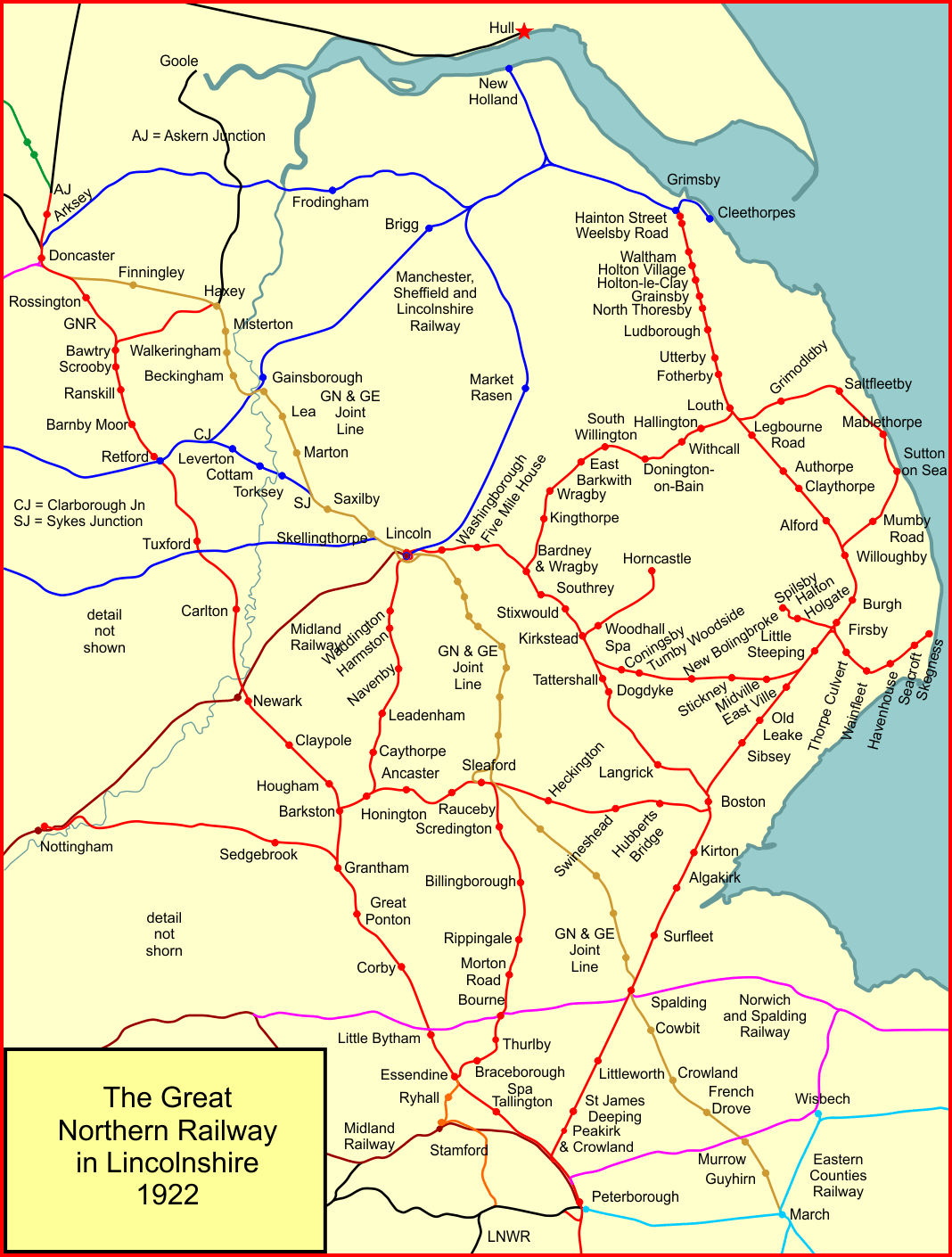
The GNR in 1922

By the Great Northern Railway (Doncaster to Gainsborough) Act 1864 (27 & 28 Vict. c. ccxliii) of 25 July 1864 the GNR at last obtained powers to build its Gainsborough to Doncaster line; it had been trying since 1847. It was authorised to raise £408,000 in share capital for the purpose.

The act of Parliament also provided for flattening the old line from Sykes Junction to Gainsborough. Bridges over the numerous watercourses were approached by short steep gradients. This section was temporarily closed on 1 December 1864; trains ran to Gainsborough via Retford for the time being. The new line was to have a bridge over the River Trent, but to save considerable expense an agreement was made with the MS&LR for the GNR to use its bridge at Bole (the River Trent crossing at Gainsborough). This change of plan was approved by the Great Northern Railway (Additional Powers) Act 1866 (29 & 30 Vict. c. cxxvii) of 28 June 1866.

The new line from Trent West Junction to Black Carr Junction with the Towns line near Doncaster, and the rebuilt line from Sykes junction to Trent East junction were brought into use for goods on 1 July 1867, and for passengers on 15 July 1867. Construction involved unusually heavy earthworks, to keep the formation almost level, the steepest gradient being 1 in 300. The passenger train service consisted of four each way between Lincoln and Doncaster on weekdays and one each way on Sundays. About 17 daily coal trains were diverted over the new line. The GNR ceased to exercise its powers between Sykes junction and Retford in 1868. Stations were at Marton, Lea (on the earlier line) and Gainsborough, Beckingham, Walkeringham, Misterton, Haxey, and Finningley.

== Honington to Lincoln ==
A branch had been authorised by the Great Northern Railway (Lincoln to Bourn) Act 1864 (27 & 28 Vict. c. ccxlii). It was cut back to run between Honington, east of Grantham, and Lincoln, and it opened in 1862.

== Spilsby branch ==
On 1 May 1868 the Spilsby branch opened; it was a short line from Firsby (on the East Lincolnshire line) where the junction faced Louth. The independent company was constantly short of money, and for some years the GNR gave it a subsidy to keep it operational. The GNR worked the line.

== Skegness branch ==
Skegness was becoming an important resort by the seaside, and the Wainfleet and Firsby Railway opened in 1871. In this case too the junction at Firsby faced Louth. The line was worked by the GNR, with eight trains each way every weekday. Passengers completed their journey to Skegness by road until 1873, when an extension of the branch line to Skegness was opened.

== Sleaford and Bourn Railway ==
The Sleaford and Bourn Railway was opened in stages in 1871 and 1872. The railway changed its spelling of Bourn to Bourne in 1872. The line was owned by the GNR.

== Nottingham to Skegness avoiding Grantham ==
The Ambergate, Nottingham, Boston and Eastern Junction Railway had constructed a line from Nottingham to Grantham and the Boston, Sleaford and Midland Counties Railway had built a line east from Grantham. There was a significant mineral flow from Nottingham to the Lincolnshire towns, as well as a developing holiday and excursion traffic. The GNR built the Sedgebrook and Barkstone (later spelt Barkston) Junction Line, connecting the two routes and avoiding Grantham. It opened in 1875.

== Louth to Bardney Line ==
A railway was planned connecting Louth to Lincoln; the plan was to give Lincoln a direct route to Grimsby via Louth. Although authorised, the Louth and Lincoln Railway Company was unable to raise enough money to build the line. Eventually it was sold on, and the route shortened to run between Louth and Bardney. At Bardney the connection was installed facing Boston, making through running inconvenient. The line opened in stages between 1874 and 1876. It was never commercially successful, and was reluctantly taken over by the GNR in 1883.

== The GN and GE Joint Line ==
The haulage of coal from Yorkshire and Nottinghamshire to the south of England and East Anglia was extremely lucrative, and for many years the Great Eastern Railway, connecting the GNR at Peterborough, had sought to get a larger part of the trade. Several attempts had been made to be permitted to build northwards, consistently refused by Parliament. The GNR could see that parliamentary opinion was moving in favour of the GER and that it was only a matter of time before that company was granted its desire. The GNR proposed a Joint Line between Doncaster and March; this would involve a new line from Spalding to Lincoln, and transfer of the Lincoln – Gainsborough – Doncaster (Black Carr Junction) line to joint control. This became the Great Northern and Great Eastern Joint Line, implemented in 1882 and 1883.

The Great Eastern route from March to Huntingdon was also transferred to joint control. The GER profited immensely from this new arrangement, bringing coal to East Anglia, and also to London via Cambridge. The March to Huntingdon transfer was supposed to enable the GNR to use that line for mineral traffic to avoid the congested lines south of Grantham, but the route involved reversal at St Ives, and was of limited practical value.

The GNR chairman defended the scheme on the basis that sharing the Joint Line was better than enabling the GER to build a competing line. The line from Spalding to Ruskington opened on 6 March 1882. The GNR March-Spalding, and the GER Huntingdon-St Ives and Needingworth junction-March lines were transferred to the Joint Committee. The remainder of the new line, Ruskington to Sincil junction, Lincoln, and an avoiding line, opened in July and August 1882.

== Louth and East Coast Railway ==
The Louth and East Coast Railway opened a line from Louth to Mablethorpe in 1877. Mablethorpe was a rising seaside resort, and the railway connection helped it considerably. However as elsewhere in Lincolnshire, the junction was laid facing against the dominant traffic.

== The route for Skegness traffic ==
Skegness had proved an extremely popular seaside resort, particularly with excursionists. All excursion trains had to reverse at Firsby, and a south curve there was considered essential. The Board of Trade sanctioned it for passenger traffic on 24 May 1881. Barkstone (later spelt Barkston) North curve was opened on 29 March 1882, enabling through running from Newark and the north towards Lincoln. The GNR asked for the doubling of the line from Firsby to Skegness but the Wainsfleet and Firsby Railway was not prepared to find the money. Some palliative improvements were carried out in 1883.

== Sutton on Sea ==
The Sutton and Willoughby Railway and Dock Company was authorised by the Sutton and Willoughby Railway Act 1884 (47 & 48 Vict. c. clxx) to build from Willoughby on the East Lincolnshire Line to Sutton on Sea and build docks there; authorised capital was £60,000. The line opened in 1886 but the docks were never built. In 1888 the line was extended to Mablethorpe, making a complete loop.

== The New Line ==
The seaside resorts of the Lincolnshire Coast proved increasingly popular, with holidaymakers and excursionists, especially from the industrial population centres of the East Midlands and Yorkshire. The route for most trains involved running via Boston and reversing there, a considerable diversion from a direct line. After a request by Skegness Town Council, the GNR built the New Line, forming a short cut between Kirkstead and Little Steeping, opened in 1913.

== Consolidation and decline ==
The Lincolnshire network of the Great Northern Railway can be categorised into the main lines, the seaside resorts, and rural branch lines.

The main lines continued to thrive, with both passenger and goods traffic. There was only limited competition from the Midland Railway and the Great Central Railway (successor to the Manchester, Sheffield and Lincolnshire Railway). Nevertheless the city of Lincoln and the port town of Boston never became major centres of industry, and the traffic they generated was limited.

The seaside resorts, Skegness, Sutton and Mablethorpe did very well for passenger traffic, and were remarkably popular. They continued to be so even as British seaside holidays declined in the mid-1960s.

The rural branches in general were not successful, largely due to the relatively sparse population in the area. As road transport began to be efficient from the late 1920s, and soon much more convenient, most of those lines were doomed.

When rationalisation was the priority in the late 1960s, the main lines were seen to be duplicated by alternative lines, and were slated for closure. Mablethorpe and Sutton declined as resorts. In 1970 a widespread closure of the former GNR lines in Lincolnshire took place. Skegness continued to be served via Grantham, Sleaford and Boston, but the rest of the East Lincolnshire Line closed. By this time most of the rural branch lines had already closed. Most of the GN&GE Joint Line continued in use, together with the Peterborough to Spalding feeder. Most of the rest of the former GNR network closed, or had already closed.
