= Leadenham =

Village and civil parish in North Kesteven district of Lincolnshire, England

Coordinates: 53.0589°N 0.5816°W

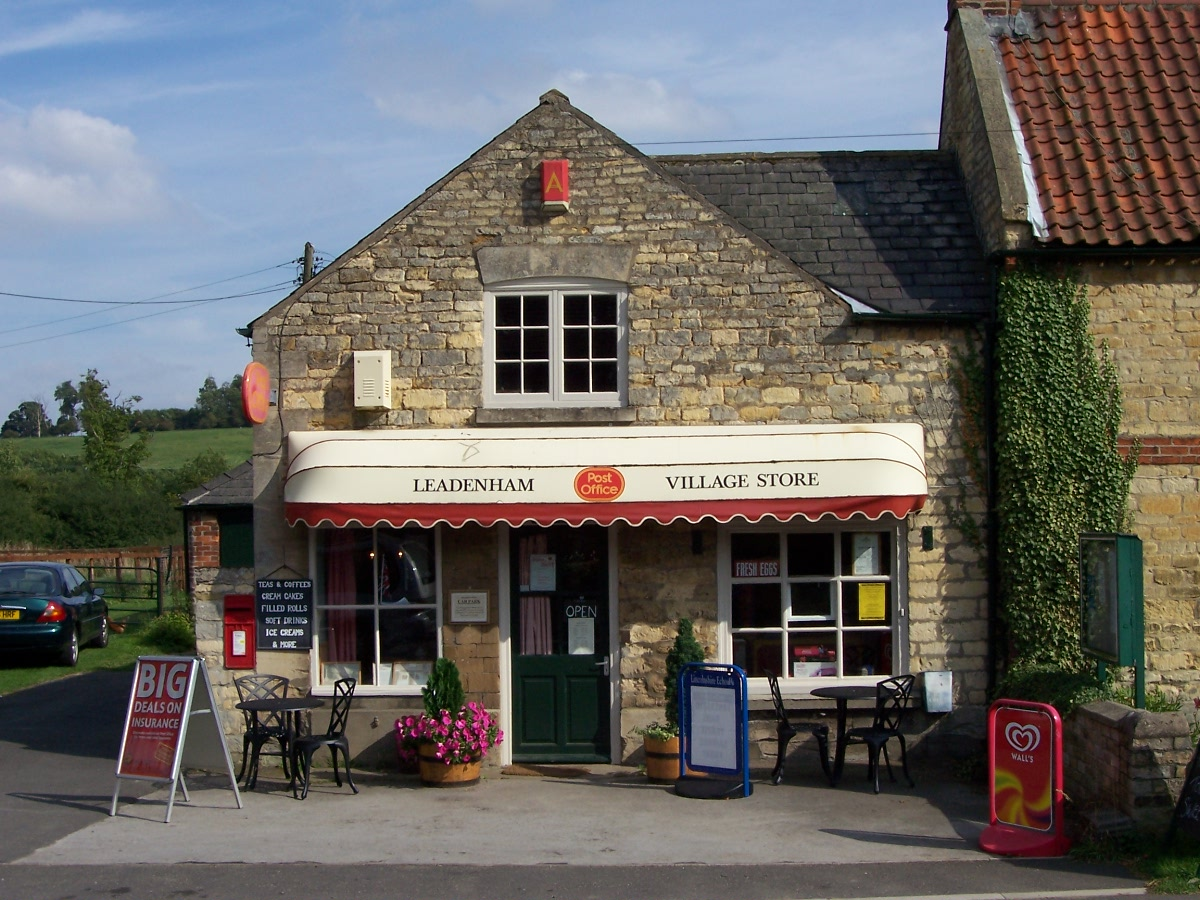
- Leadenham post office

- Location within Lincolnshire
- Population: 410 (2011)
- OS grid reference: SK952524
  - London: 110 mi (180 km) S
- District: North Kesteven
- Shire county: Lincolnshire
- Region: East Midlands
- Country: England
- Sovereign state: United Kingdom
- Post town: Lincoln
- Postcode district: LN5
- Police: Lincolnshire
- Fire: Lincolnshire
- Ambulance: East Midlands
- UK Parliament: Sleaford and North Hykeham

Leadenham is a village and civil parish in the North Kesteven district of Lincolnshire, England. The population of the civil parish at the 2011 census was 410. It lies 11 miles (18 km) north of Grantham, 14 miles (23 km) south of Lincoln and 9 miles (14 km) north west of Sleaford the A607 between Welbourn and Fulbeck, and at the southern edge of the Lincoln Cliff.

== History ==
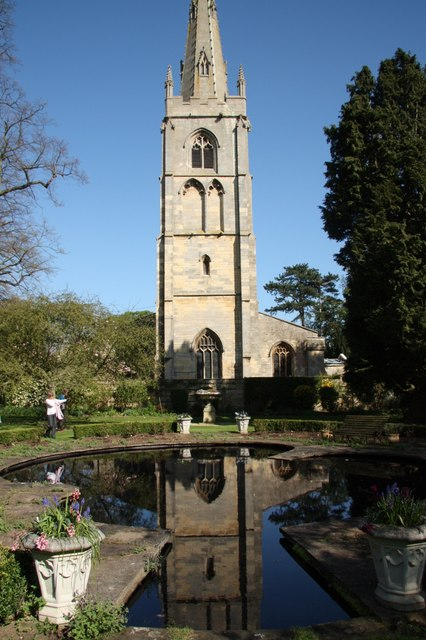
Saint Swithun's church, Leadenham

There is evidence of Bronze Age, Romano-British and Early Medieval occupation.

The name of the village probably comes from the Anglo-Saxon 'Leodan' and 'ham' for "homestead or village of a man called Leoda." It appears in the Domesday Book as "Ledeneham".

Much of the village belonged to the Reeve family whose family seat is still Leadenham House, a Georgian country house built from 1790 for William Reeve.

The Royal Flying Corps airfield to the east was built in 1916, and closed in 1919.

The village boasted a railway station from 1876 to 1965 which was part of the Grantham and Lincoln Railway Line.

== Geography ==
In 1995 the village was bypassed to the south by the A17.

Work on the bypass started on Thursday 17 February 1994. It cost £3.3m, being built by May Gurney. The bypass was opened on Friday 10 March 1995 by Douglas Hogg.

== Community ==
Leadenham Anglican church is dedicated to St Swithun; it originated in the 13th century and is in Decorated style.

The ecclesiastical parish is part of the Loveden Deanery of the Diocese of Lincoln. As of 2016, the incumbent is Rev Alison Healy.

The Village Post Office is in the heart of Leadenham on Main Road. In 2015, Leadenham Teahouse opened within the Post Office. In March 2017, the Post Office and Leadenham Teahouse won a Rural Oscar with the Countryside Alliance awards for the Best Post Office and Village Shop in the East of England.

The village public house is the George Hotel on High Street (A607).

== Transport ==
Leadenham is served by the hourly Lincolnshire InterConnect route 1 operated by Stagecoach Lincolnshire (between Lincoln and Grantham).
