= Caythorpe railway station =

Former railway station in Lincolnshire, England

Coordinates: 53.02515°N 0.58779°W

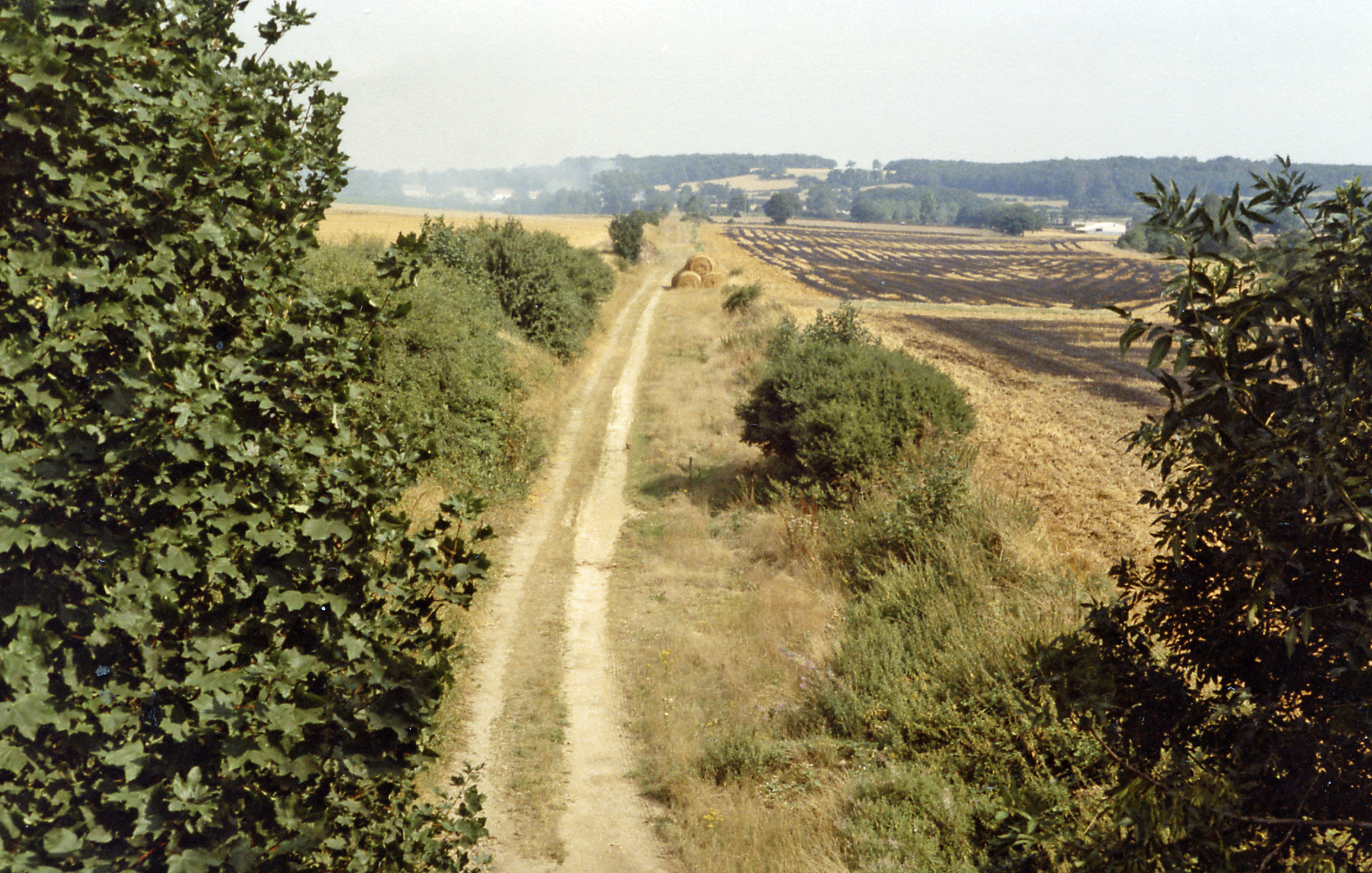
former trackbed from the station overbridge

Caythorpe railway station was a station in Caythorpe, Lincolnshire. Built to serve the nearby village of the same name. It was on the Grantham and Lincoln railway line. The line was built by the Great Northern Railway. The station closed for passengers in 1962, for goods in 1964 and the line closed in 1965 as part of the Beeching rationalisation of the UK railway system. The site now houses a recycling centre for household waste.

The Great Northern Railway (GNR) was a British railway company established by the Great Northern Railway Act 1846 (9 & 10 Vict. c. lxxi). On 1 January 1923 the company lost its identity as a constituent of the newly formed London and North Eastern Railway.

The line, opened in 1867, ran through land at Caythorpe owned by GNR chairman George Hussey Packe. Packe's land was the first in south-west Lincolnshire to be mined for iron ore. Opencast workings were either side of the line and used narrow gauge links to rail heads on the line.

Preceding station	Disused railways	Following station
Honington; Line and station closed	Grantham and Lincoln railway line	Leadenham; Line and station closed
