= Navenby railway station =

Former railway station in Lincolnshire, England

Coordinates: 53.1087°N 0.5434°W

Navenby Station in 1920

Navenby railway station was a railway station in Navenby, Lincolnshire on the Grantham and Lincoln railway line. The station closed for passengers in 1962 and freight in 1964 but the line remained open until it was closed in 1965 as part of the Beeching Axe.

Preceding station	Disused railways	Following station
Leadenham; Line and station closed	Great Northern Railway; Grantham and Lincoln railway line	Harmston; Line and station closed
