= Waddington railway station =

Former railway station in Lincolnshire, England

Coordinates: 53.1753°N 0.5560°W

Waddington railway station was a station in Waddington, Lincolnshire which opened on 15 April 1867 but closed for passengers on 10 September 1962 and for freight in 1964. The line through the station remained open until 1965.

The remaining buildings attributed to the Waddington Railway Station have been restored during the summer of 2010. These are located adjacent to the properties on Station Rd.

Preceding station	Disused railways	Following station
Harmston; Line and station closed	Great Northern Railway; Grantham and Lincoln railway line	Lincoln Central; Line closed, station open
