= Barkston railway station =

Former railway station in Lincolnshire, England

Coordinates: 52.96602°N 0.64249°W

Barkston
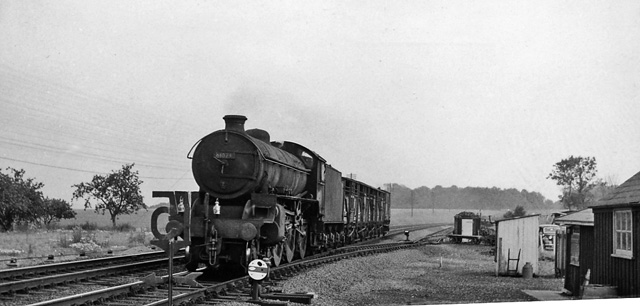
- Goods train passing through site of Barkston station

General information
- Location: Barkston, South Kesteven; England
- Platforms: 2

Other information
- Status: Disused

History
- Original company: Boston, Sleaford and Midland Counties Railway
- Pre-grouping: Great Northern Railway
- Post-grouping: London and North Eastern Railway

Key dates
- 1 July 1867: Opened
- 1955: Closed for regular passenger service
- 1964: closed for freight traffic
- 2006: Barkston Junction closed and lifted following the opening of the Allington Chord
Location

Barkston railway station is a former station serving the village of Barkston, Lincolnshire. It was on the Great Northern Railway main line near to the now realigned (Allington chord) junction with the lines to Sleaford and Lincoln. The station was closed for passengers in 1955 and goods in 1964 . It has been demolished leaving no trace today of its existence.

Preceding station	Historical railways	Following station
Grantham; Line and station open	Great Northern Railway; East Coast Main Line	Hougham; Line open, station closed
	Disused railways	
Grantham; Line and station open	Great Northern Railway; Grantham to Boston Line	Honington; Line and station closed
Grantham; Line and station open	Great Northern Railway; Grantham to Lincoln Line	Honington; Line and station closed
