= Frisby and Kirby =

Former civil parish in Leicestershire, England

Coordinates: 52.7508°N 0.9548°W

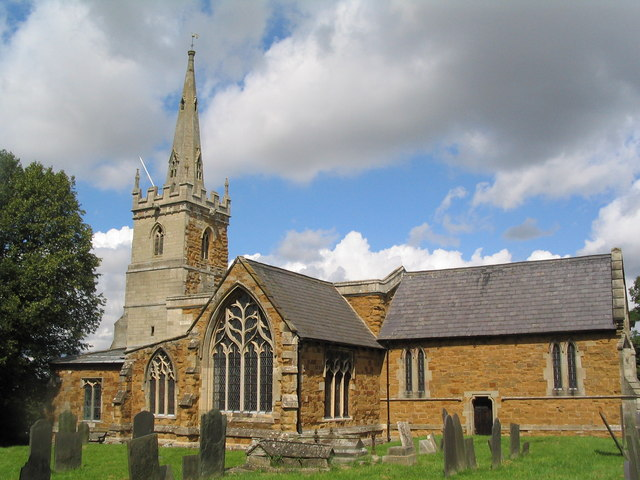
- Frisby on the Wreake church

- Location within Leicestershire
- Civil parish: Frisby on the Wreake; Kirby Bellars
- District: Melton
- Shire county: Leicestershire
- Region: East Midlands
- Country: England
- Sovereign state: United Kingdom

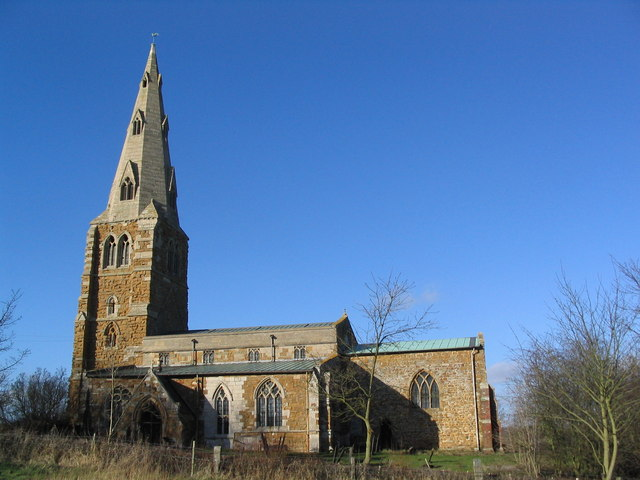
Kirby Bellars

Frisby and Kirby, formerly just Frisby is a former civil parish in the Melton district, in the county of Leicestershire, England. Its principal settlements were the villages of Frisby on the Wreake and Kirby Bellars, now both civil parishes in their own right. In 2001 it had a population of 890.

== History ==
The parish was formed on 1 April 1936 as "Frisby" from the parishes of "Frisby on the Wreak" and "Kirby Bellars". On 30 July 1980 it was renamed "Frisby & Kirby".

On 1 April 2005 the parish was abolished and split to "Frisby on the Wreake" and "Kirby Bellars".
