= Leadenham railway station =

Former railway station in Lincolnshire, England

Coordinates: 53.0633°N 0.5743°W

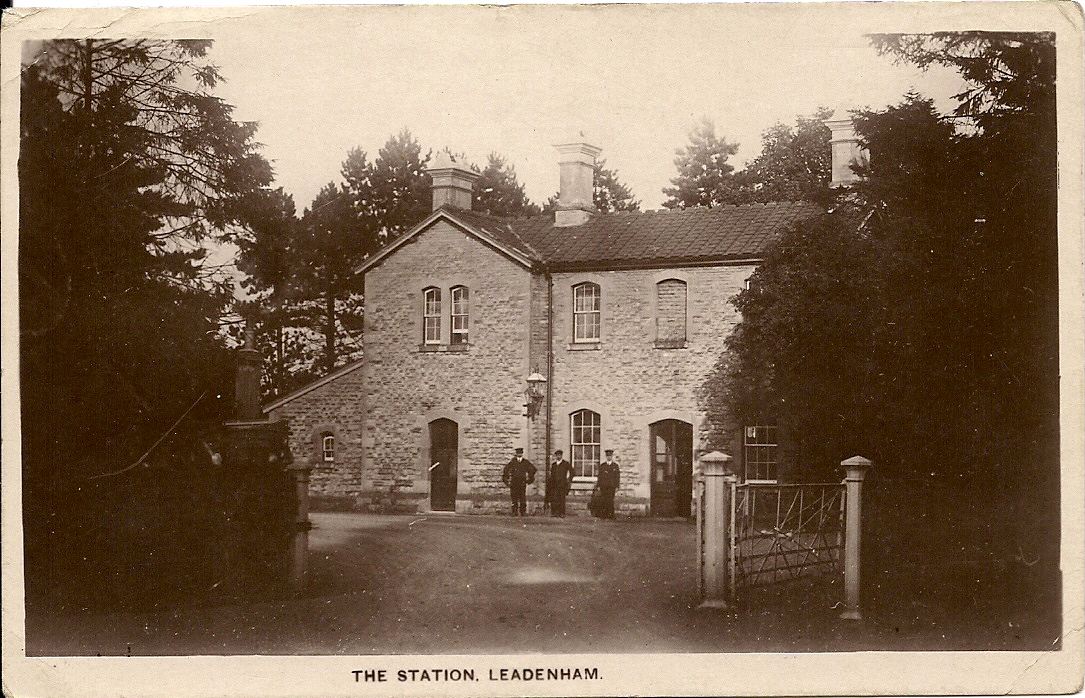
Leadenham Railway Station

Leadenham railway station was a railway station in Leadenham, Lincolnshire. It closed on 1 November 1965.

The station was located on Main Road, being built in 1867 from coursed rubble with flush ashlar dressings along with a slate roof with overhanging eaves. As the station was on the parish border between the Leadenham and Welbourn, Ancaster stone was used for the station and the goods shed and bridge to the north were built of red brick as they fell within the Welbourn parish. The design of the station differed from most of the stations on the line that were built of red brick, but local landowner Lieutenant-General J. Reeve of Leadenham Hall insisted that the station was to be built of local stone. Ordnance Survey maps from 1887 and 1905 show the station building to the west of the railway tracks with a waiting shelter on the opposite platform. There was also a signal box to the north.

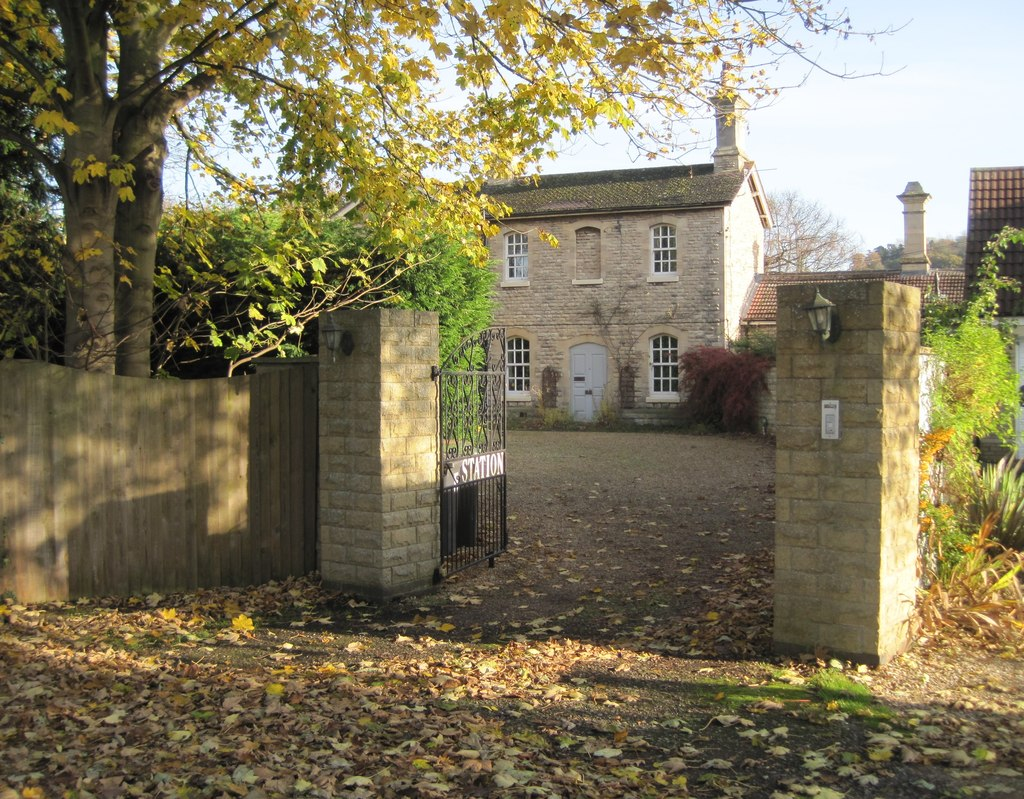
Leadenham Railway Station as of 11 November 2012

The old station building is still standing, it is a Grade II listed building which is now a private residence. The goods shed is also still standing and is currently a car dealership, with the gateway to the premises being a re-sited original GNR gate and piers. The bridge to the north is still in use too, but only for road traffic. The signal box and waiting shelter have both been demolished.

Preceding station	Disused railways	Following station
Caythorpe; Line and station closed	Great Northern Railway; Grantham and Lincoln railway line	Navenby; Line and station closed
