= Harmston railway station =

Former railway station in Lincolnshire, England

Coordinates: 53.1490°N 0.5617°W

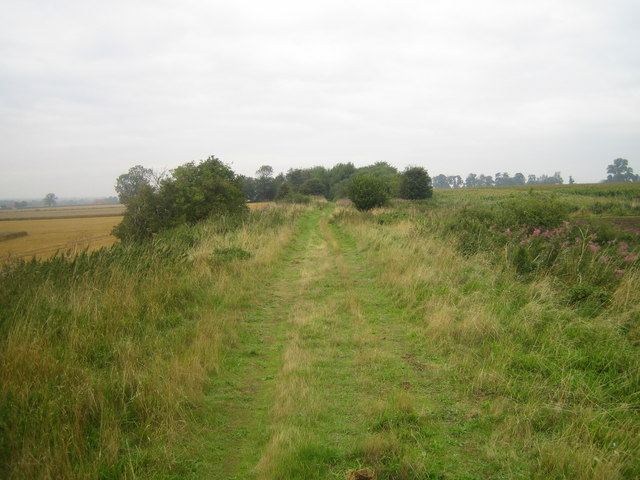
Dismantled railway

Harmston railway station was a station in Harmston, Lincolnshire on the Grantham and Lincoln railway line. It closed in 1962 but the line remained open until 1965.

| Preceding station | Disused railways | Following station |
|---|---|---|
| Navenby; Line and station closed | Great Northern Railway; Grantham and Lincoln railway line | Waddington; Line and station closed |
