= Boston, Sleaford and Midland Counties Railway =

Railway line in England

The Boston, Sleaford and Midland Counties Railway opened a railway line between Grantham and Boston, through Sleaford, England. It opened in two stages, in 1857 and 1859.

Although not a major line, it formed part of a route from industrial cities in the East Midlands to Lincolnshire seaside resorts, and a major seasonal traffic developed in the twentieth century.

The line remains open at the present day.

== Ambergate, Nottingham, Boston and Eastern Junction Railway ==
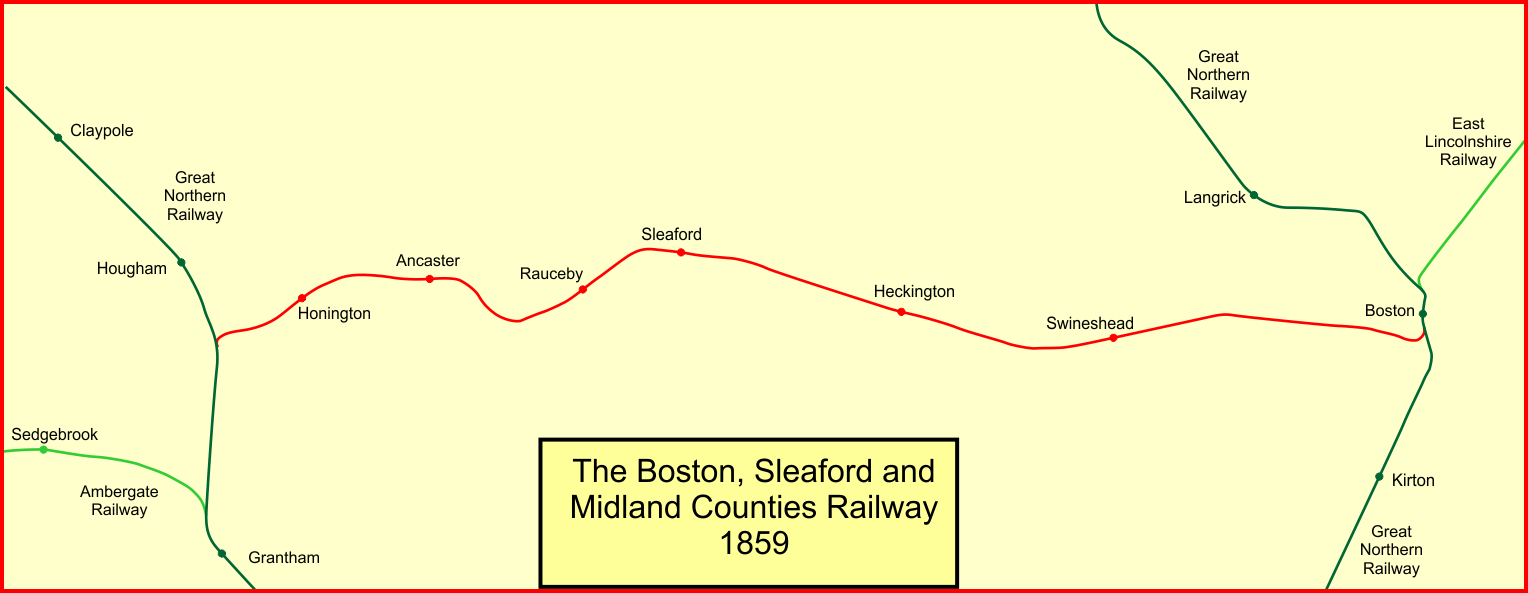
The Boston, Sleaford and Midland Counties Railway in 1859

In 1846 the Ambergate, Nottingham, Boston and Eastern Junction Railway had been authorised. Its intention was to connect the manufacturing districts of the north-west of England (by connecting with partner railways in the area) with the Nottinghamshire colliery districts and the port of Boston, in Lincolnshire.

In fact the company found it impossible to raise the huge capital needed for such a scheme, and it settled for a line between Colwick (a few miles east of Nottingham) and Grantham, where it connected with the Great Northern Railway. The Corporation of Boston was dismayed at this and appealed to the Ambergate company in August 1847 "to complete their line with as little delay as possible." The appeal was made in vain and the Ambergate company opened its line west of Grantham only, in 1853. It was leased by the Great Northern Railway in 1855. The company, now simply a financial shell, changed its name to the Nottingham and Grantham Railway and Canal Company.

== Boston, Sleaford and Midland Counties Railway formed ==
Boston, Sleaford and Midland Counties Railway Act 1853
- Act of Parliament
- Parliament of the United Kingdom
- Long title: An Act for making a Railway from the Great Northern Railway at Boston in the County of Lincoln to the Great Northern Railway at Barkstone in the same County, and for other Purposes.
- Citation: 16 & 17 Vict. c. ccxxiii

Dates
- Royal assent: 20 August 1853

Text of statute as originally enacted

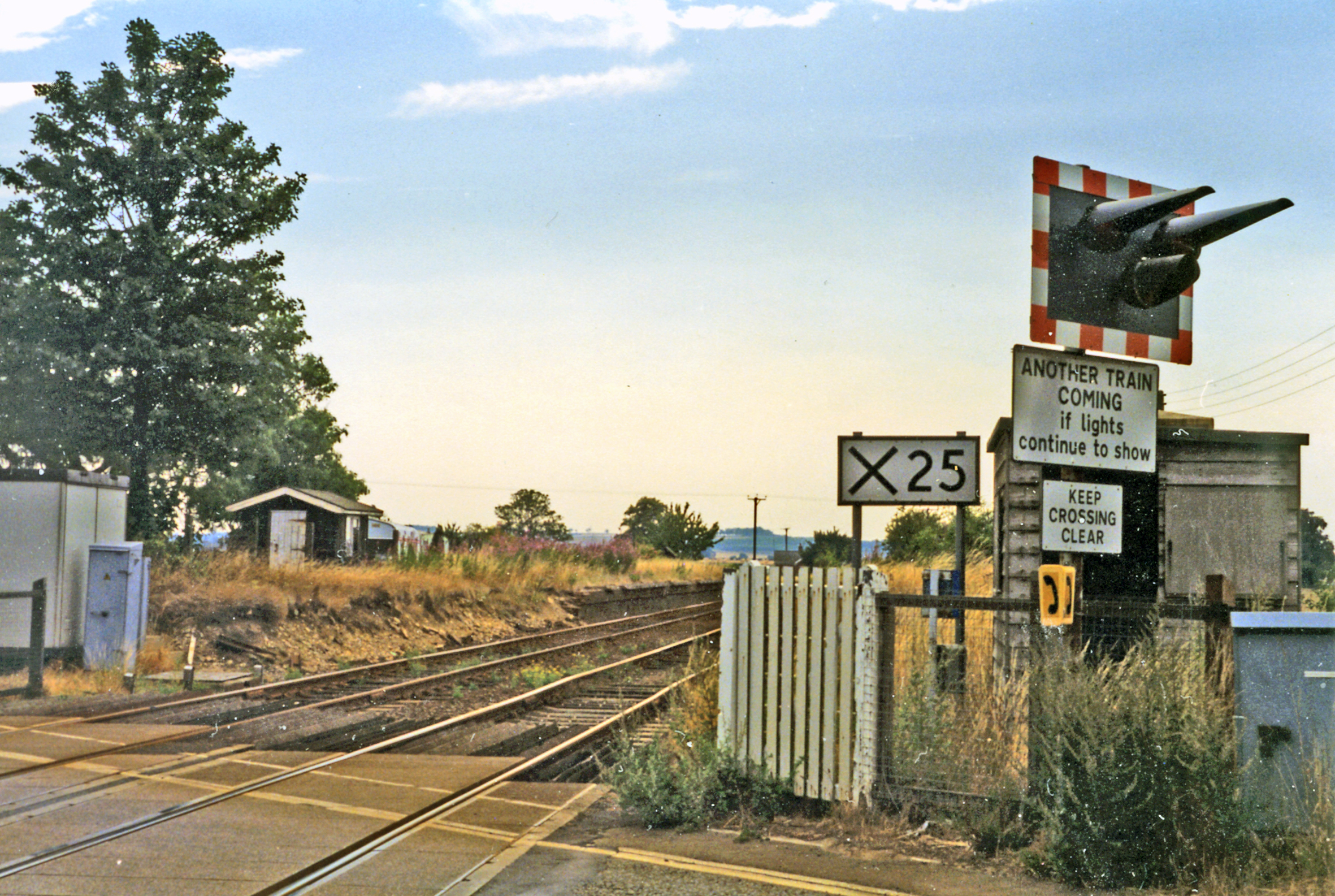
Honington station

Undeterred by the failure of the Ambergate company to reach Boston, promoters put forward a scheme that became the Boston, Sleaford and Midland Counties Railway; this was to connect Grantham and Boston, so completing the eastern part of the Ambergate scheme. The Boston, Sleaford and Midland Counties Railway Act 1853 (16 & 17 Vict. c. ccxxiii) obtained royal assent on 20 August 1853. (Note: Wright refers to the company as the Boston and Midland Counties Railway and Docks Company, quoting the same incorporation date.) It would start from Boston South Junction (later Boston, Sleaford Junction) on the East Lincolnshire Railway (opened 1848, and leased to the Great Northern Railway). The line would run via Sleaford to Barkston East Junction on the GNR main line from London to Doncaster. At Barkston East Junction, a branch was to continue westwards under the GNR main line to connect at Allington Junction with the Ambergate line, so that traffic from Boston could continue to Nottingham.

== Opening from Barkston to Sleaford ==
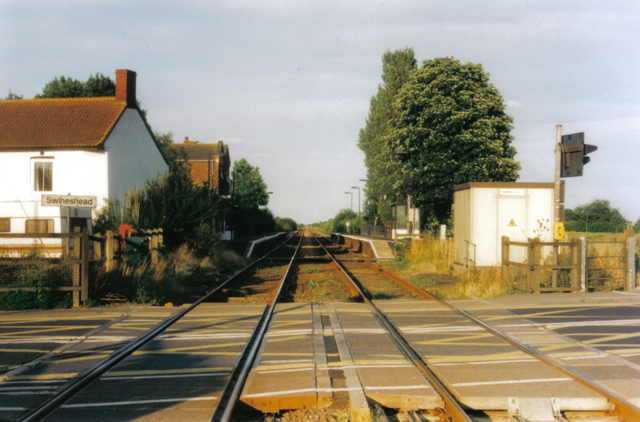
Swineshead station

When Captain Tyler of the Board of Trade inspected the line preparatory to opening for passenger traffic as far as Sleaford, he reported that it was a single line, with four bridges under the railway, and one timber viaduct. He did not approve the opening, but when Colonel Yolland visited on 13 June, he was satisfied that it could be opened, provided that tank engines were used until a turntable was installed at Sleaford. The line to a temporary terminus there was opened to the public from Sleaford to Barkston Junction on 16 June 1857. The GNR worked the line from the start, for 50% of gross earnings. The Barkston to Allington section was later in completion, opening in 1875.

In a shareholders' meeting it was reported by the Company Secretary that the first part of the line opened for passenger traffic on 15 June, but this was probably a ceremonial opening. The report said that it opened for goods traffic on 1 September, and that the "Ancaster stone traffic began in December".

== Opening from Sleaford to Boston ==
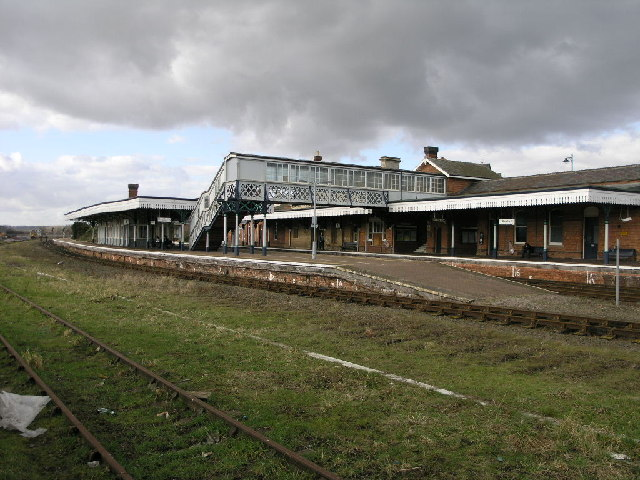
Sleaford station

The second part of the line was inspected by Captain Tyler on 31 March, but he was not satisfied, requiring the electric telegraph to be installed, the junction and signalman's stage at Boston to be completed, clocks at stations, a ballast pit near Sleaford to be fenced, contractors' gear removed, a safe method of working to be determined by the GNR, and iron spikes instead of wooden trenails used to secure chairs to sleepers. On his second visit he was satisfied that these conditions had been fulfilled. This section opened on 12 or 13 April 1859. The single line was to be worked in two sections by staff and ticket. The opening day was marred by a mishap when the 3.10 p.m. passenger train from Grantham ran into some coal wagons at Sleaford, which were being shunted from one side of the line to the other by coal merchants' men without the permission of railway staff.

== Absorbed by the GNR ==
The Boston, Sleaford and Midland Counties Railway was absorbed by the Great Northern Railway, by the Great Northern Railway (Lincoln to Bourn) Act 1864 (27 & 28 Vict. c. ccxlii) of 25 July 1864, effective on 1 January 1865.

The line had been built as a single line, but it was progressively doubled; the whole line was double by 1881.

== Barkston detail ==
An exchange station at Barkston was opened at the junction on 1 July 1867, to facilitate passengers' journeys from the Newark direction for Sleaford and Boston, platforms being staggered on either side of the level crossing, separate from the down main line and branch.

== Sedgebrook and Barkston ==
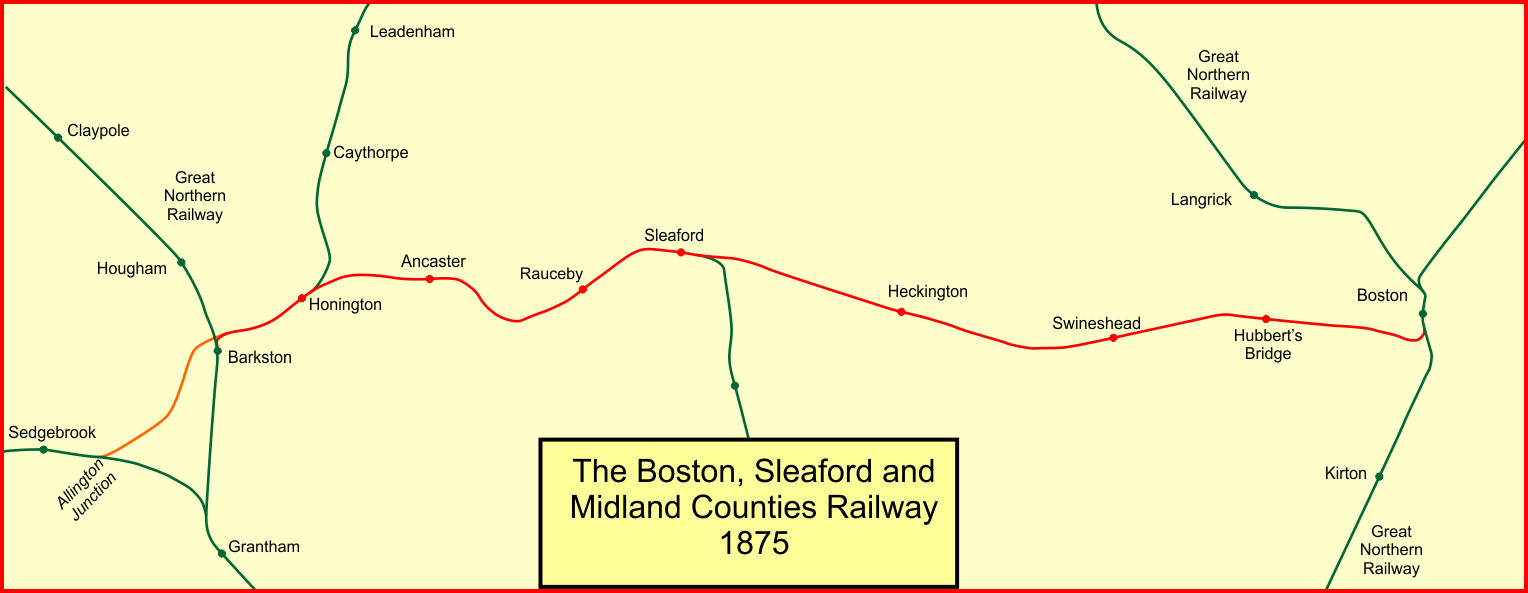
The former Boston, Sleaford and Midland Counties Railway in 1875

By the Great Northern Railway (Additional Powers) Act 1873 (36 & 37 Vict. c. xc) of 28 July 1873 the GNR obtained powers to construct the Sedgebrook and Barkstone Junction line. (The railway used the spelling "Barkstone" until December 1916. This was built with the main aim of simplifying the movement of coal from Nottinghamshire to Lincolnshire without reversal at Grantham. It was originally planned to extend from Allington junction, near Sedgebrook on the Nottingham and Grantham line, to a junction with the main line at Barkston, south of the junction with the Boston line. However on 10 January 1874 a passenger train from Boston overran signals at that junction, and fouled the path of an up Scotch express. The engine of the express struck the branch train's carriages and then grazed wagons of a passing down train. The fireman and a passenger were killed. As a result it was decided to take the new line under the main line north of Barkston station and make the junction with the Boston line, a deviation authorised by the Great Northern Railway Act 1875 (38 & 39 Vict. c. cx) of 29 June 1875.

The new bridge was completed on 18 January 1875; the line was made double track, 4 miles 3 chains from Allington junction to Barkston East junction. The line opened on 29 October 1875, with three freight trains each way daily; it was soon used extensively in summer by passenger trains from Nottingham and Leicester to Skegness. There were no intermediate stations or boxes but the long section was broken in May 1883 by opening Marston box, 1 1/2 miles from Allington junction.

== Barkston North Curve ==
The growth of Skegness holiday traffic moved the GNR to build a north curve at Barkston, enabling direct running from the Newark direction towards Sleaford. The north curve was opened on 29 March 1882; it was retrospectively authorised by the Great Northern Railway Act 1882 (45 & 46 Vict. c. cxci) on 10 August. It was double track, and 36 chains in length, mostly on a curve of 15 chains radius.

RAILWAY AT BARKSTONE.—A railway (3 furlongs 5·57 chains in length) wholly in the parish of Barkstone in the parts of Kesteven in Lincolnshire commencing by a junction with the Sedgebrook and Barkstone line of the Company and terminating by a junction with the main line of the Company about 3 chains from the post denoting 110 miles from London. — Section 5, Great Northern Railway Act 1882 (45 & 46 Vict. c. cxci)

From the summer of 1903, there was a GNR West Riding express from Leeds to Cromer and Yarmouth using the north curve.

== Train service ==
In 1895 there were seven stopping trains along the line daily, with no Sunday service. By 1911 there was one further stopping train and two limited-stop trains.

In July 1922 there were four stopping trains each way daily, supplemented by five Saturday fast trains running through to coastal destinations. By 1938 the ordinary train service had reduced to five daily, but twelve fast holiday trains ran on Saturdays (one on Friday late afternoons).

== Connecting lines ==
The route from Grantham to Lincoln was considered roundabout, and the Grantham and Lincoln railway line was opened from Honington, on the Grantham to Sleaford line, in 1867. It ran direct to Lincoln.

In 1872 a new line was built from Bourne to Sleaford under the sponsorship of the GNR. Known as the Bourne and Sleaford Railway, it was of local significance only.

In 1882 the Great Northern and Great Eastern Joint Railway was opened through Sleaford. In the Sleaford area this was a new railway, although it connected at its extremities with pre-existing lines which were now placed in the joint control and ownership. The line was designed for heavy mineral flows from the Yorkshire coalfields to London and East Anglia, and a bypass (avoiding) line was built for Sleaford to avoid conflict with ordinary traffic; a connection was built at each end of Sleaford to enable trains on the Joint Line to make station calls at Sleaford.

In 1917 the Cranwell branch line was opened from Sleaford to a Royal Naval Air Station at Cranwell, later RAF Cranwell.

== Allington curve ==
On 3 October 2005 a chord line was made at Allington, enabling trains from Grantham to reach the Boston line without running on the East Coast Main Line.

== Closures ==
Passenger services on the branch to Cranwell RAF College ceased in 1927, followed by those to Bourne on 22 September 1930.

The Bourne and Sleaford line closed in 1956, and the Honington to Lincoln line closed in 1965. Barkston North Curve closed in 1972.

== Station list ==
- Barkston East Junction; with GNR main line;
- Honington; opened 1 July 1857; closed 10 September 1962;
- Ancaster; opened 15 or 16 June 1857; still open;
- Rauceby; opened 1 October 1881; still open;
- Sleaford; opened 15 or 16 June 1857; still open;
- Heckington; opened 13 April 1859; still open;
- Swineshead; 13 April 1859; still open;
- Hubbards Bridge; opened 1860; name soon changed to Hubbert's Bridge; still open;
- Boston, Sleaford Junction; joins GNR line;
- Boston; opened 2 October 1848; still open.

== See also ==
Lincolnshire lines of the Great Northern Railway
