= Honington, Lincolnshire =

Village in Lincolnshire

Coordinates: 52.976995°N 0.59084°W

Honington
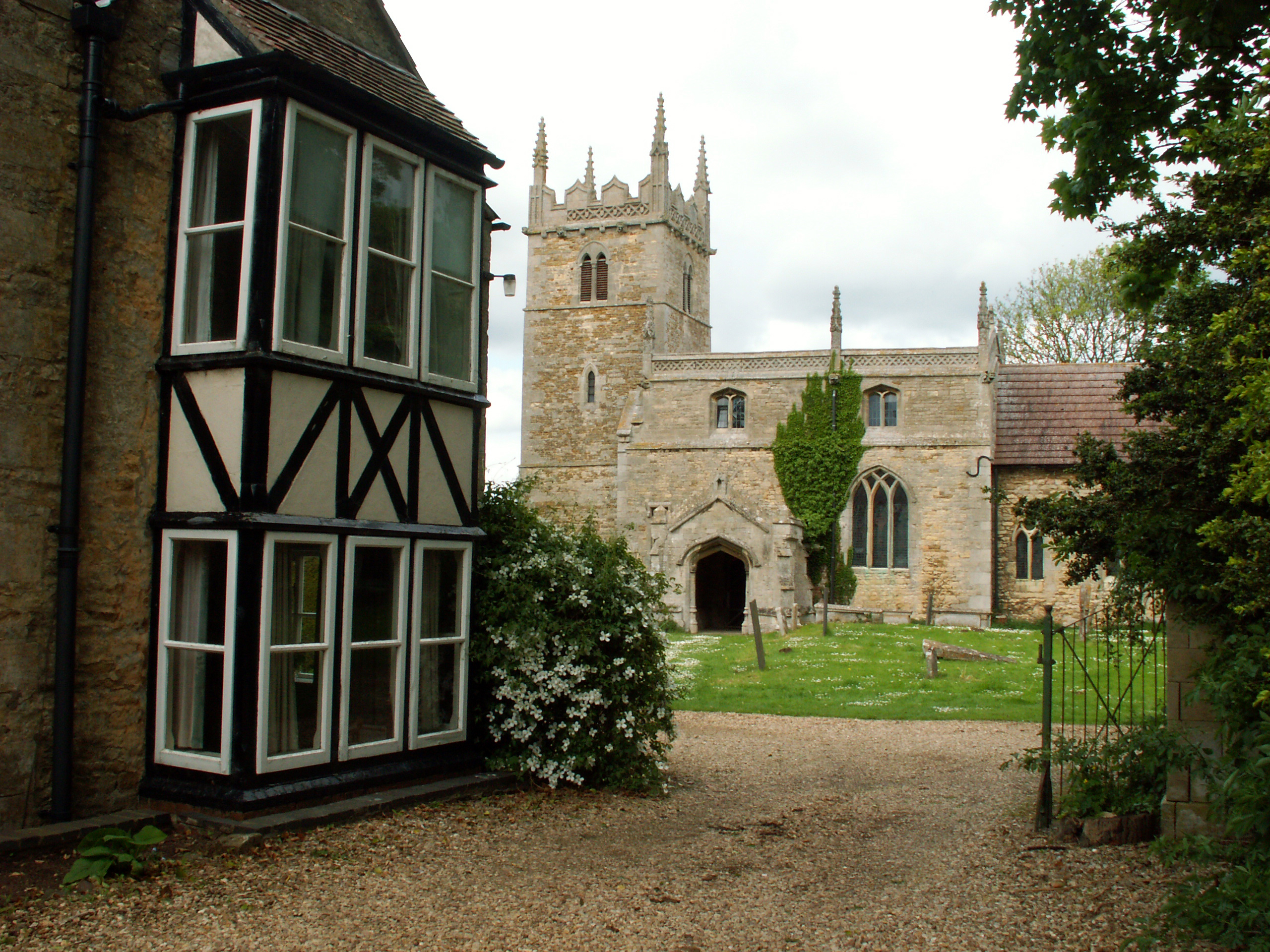
- St Wilfrid's Church and vicarage, Honington

- Location within Lincolnshire
- Population: 133 (2001)
- OS grid reference: SK947431
  - London: 100 mi (160 km) S
- District: South Kesteven
- Shire county: Lincolnshire
- Region: East Midlands
- Country: England
- Sovereign state: United Kingdom
- Post town: GRANTHAM
- Postcode district: NG32
- Dialling code: 01400
- Police: Lincolnshire
- Fire: Lincolnshire
- Ambulance: East Midlands
- UK Parliament: Grantham and Bourne

Honington is an English village and civil parish in the South Kesteven district of Lincolnshire. It lies just north of the junction between the A153 and A607 roads, about 5.5 miles (8.9 km) north of Grantham and 8 miles (12.9 km) west of Sleaford.

== History ==
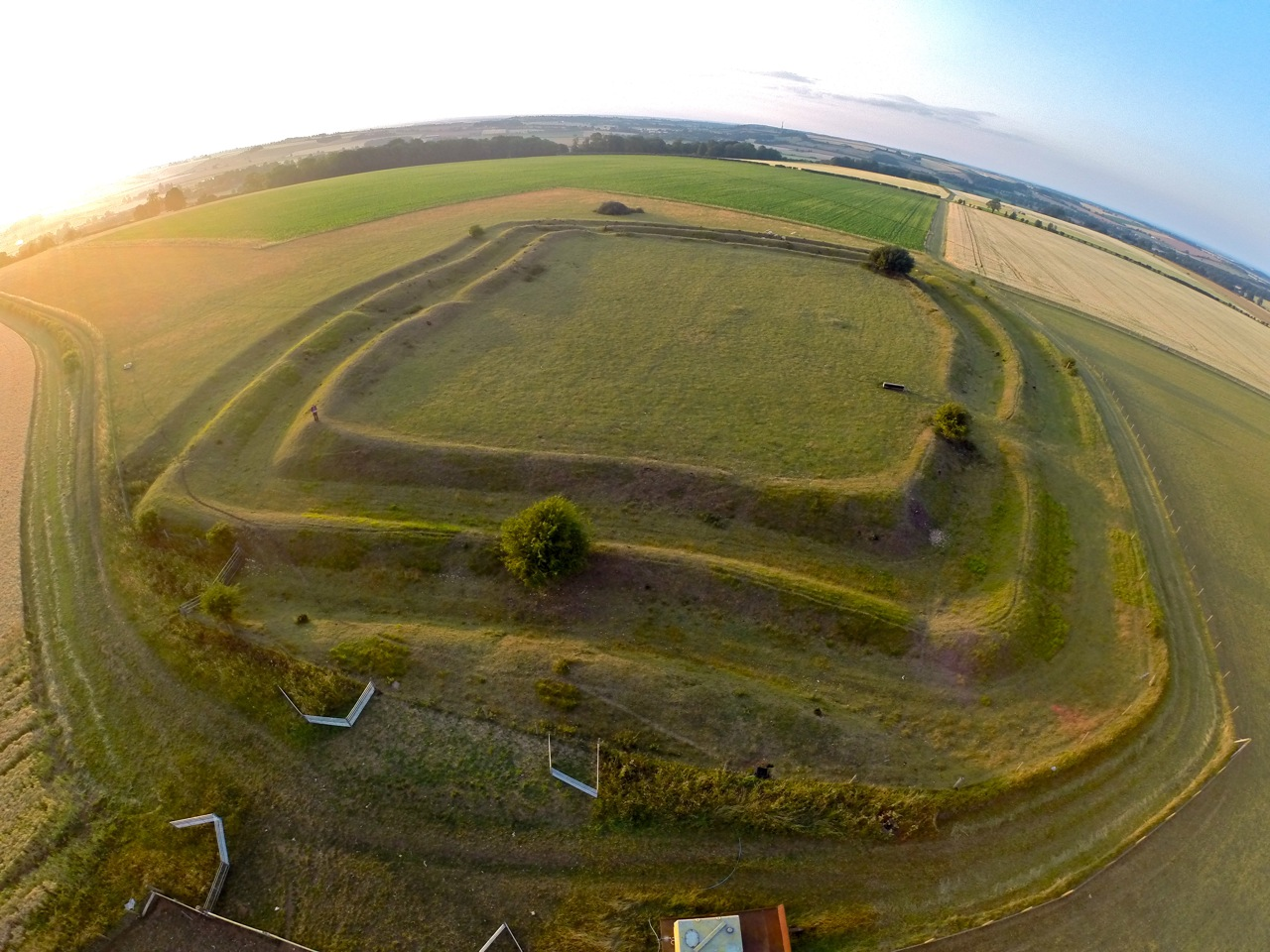
Honington Hill Fort

To the east of Honington are earthwork remains of an Iron Age fort, measuring 130-by-116-metre (427 by 381 ft) with defensive banks and ditches. There a hoard of Roman coins was found in 1691, although an investigation in 1976 could find no evidence of Roman occupation. The 1885 Kelly's Directory view of the earthworks "on the heath near the village" is that it is the site of a Roman Camp with fosse and vallum.

In the Domesday account of 1086, Honington appears as "Hondintone", "Hundindune" and "Hundinton". Honington consisted of two manors in the old wapentake of Threo. Before the conquest one lordship worth 9 geld units was held by Godwin of Barrowby, and after by Ivo Tallboys. The smaller lordship, worth three geld units, was held by Ulf (Fenman) before the 1066 conquest, then in 1086 by Fulbert with Gilbert of Ghent as his tenant-in-chief. Honington, like every Lincolnshire village, was assessed at twelve carucates to the geld was known as a hundred in the 11th century, each hundred being a fiscal unit distinct from the larger political wapentake.

The village belonged to the historical wapentake of Winnibriggs and Threo after the mergers of wapentakes that occurred in the 11th–13th centuries.

== Economy and amenities ==
Kelly's noted that Honington was a parish and railway station on the Grantham, Sleaford and Boston branch of the Great Northern Railway, at the junction with the Lincoln line. Agricultural production was chiefly wheat, barley, oats, turnips and seeds, in a parish area of 1,454 acres (5.88 km^{2}) with an 1881 population of 177. The Lord of the manor and sole landowner was Edward Southwell Trafford of Wroxham Hall, Norwich.

Honington Hall, seat of James Hornsby JP was built in 1862–1863 as a stone building in Elizabethan style with an attached observatory tower. A mixed parish school was built in 1863 for 60 children.

In December 2015 Fibre to the Cabinet Broadband was installed in the village as part of a Lincolnshire-wide scheme to upgrade the infrastructure.

== Church ==
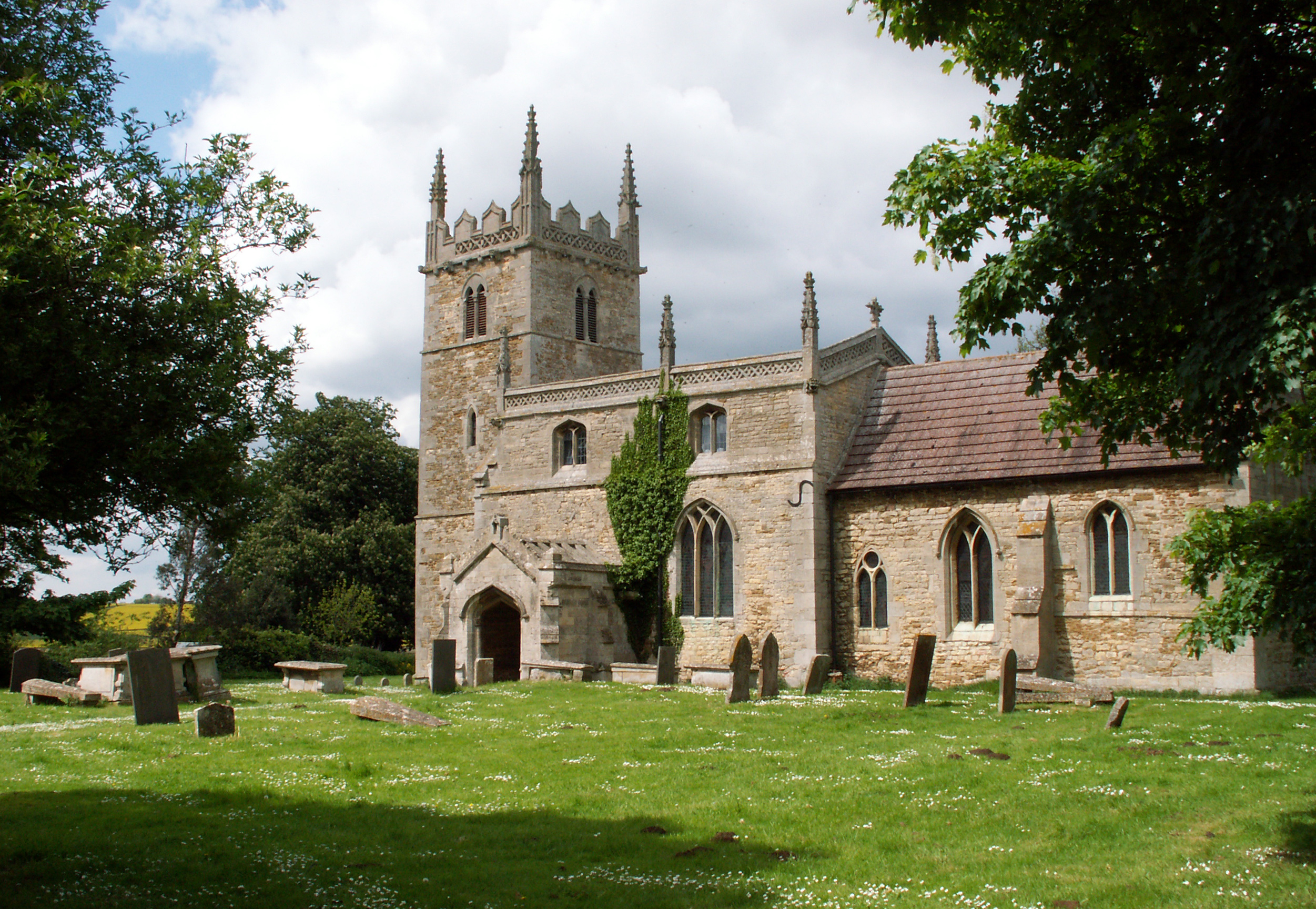
St Wilfrid's Church from the southeast

The ecclesiastical parish of Honington shares the civil-parish boundaries, as part of the Barkston and Hough Group of the Loveden Deanery of the Diocese of Lincoln. The originally 11th-century Anglican parish church, dedicated to St Wilfrid, is Grade II listed. The incumbent in 2013 was Rev. Alan Littlewood.

Kelly's noted that the church of St Wilfrid seated 120 people. It is in Norman, Early English and later styles, and consists of a chancel with a north aisle or chapel, a clerestoried nave of two bays, a porch, and a square tower of Early English date, with a Perpendicular parapet and pinnacles, containing three bells. The north aisle is late Perpendicular and the chancel arch encloses the remains of a stone screen. The original aisle or chapel was built by the Hussey family in reign of Henry VIII. At the west end of the chapel is a stone monument with figure to William Smith, died 1550, his wife, a daughter of Augustine Porter of Belton, and six children. In the pavement of the chancel is a grey slab, formerly commemorating a priest whose effigy partly remains, but now covered by a brass plate inscribed to John Hussey, died 1553, benefactor to Honington parish and Caythorpe. In 1873 the nave was restored and reseated, and the interior of the tower restored. Pevsner notes further monuments, including a bust of Thomas Hussey, died 1697, and an architectural tomb to Dame Sarah Hussey, died 1714, and also a 17th-century communion rail, a 1577 gilt beaker, and a 1732 paten and flagon by Benjamin Godfrey.
