= Lincoln Cliff =

Portion of escarpment in central Lincolnshire, England

Coordinates: 53.20°N 0.53°W

- Natural region
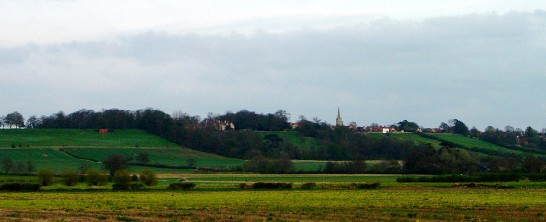
- Lincoln Cliff at Coleby

- The Lincoln Cliff and all the settlements along its course
- Country: United Kingdom
- Constituent country: England
- Region: East Midlands; Yorkshire and the Humber
- Counties: Lincolnshire
- Time zone: UTC±0 (Greenwich Mean Time)
  - Summer (DST): UTC+1 (British Summer Time)

The Lincoln Edge is a portion of a major escarpment that runs north–south through the historic divisions of Lindsey and Kesteven in central Lincolnshire from the River Humber estuary at its northern end north to Grantham at its southern end. It is a prominent landscape feature in a generally flat portion of the county. The section of the ridge north of Lincoln is sometimes referred to as the Lincoln Cliff or simply the Cliff. Towards its northern tip, near Scunthorpe, it is sometimes referred to as the Trent Cliff.

The Lincoln Gap is a break in the escarpment through which flows the River Witham eastwards towards the North Sea; similarly the Ancaster Gap further southwards provides a route for the River Slea.

== Description ==
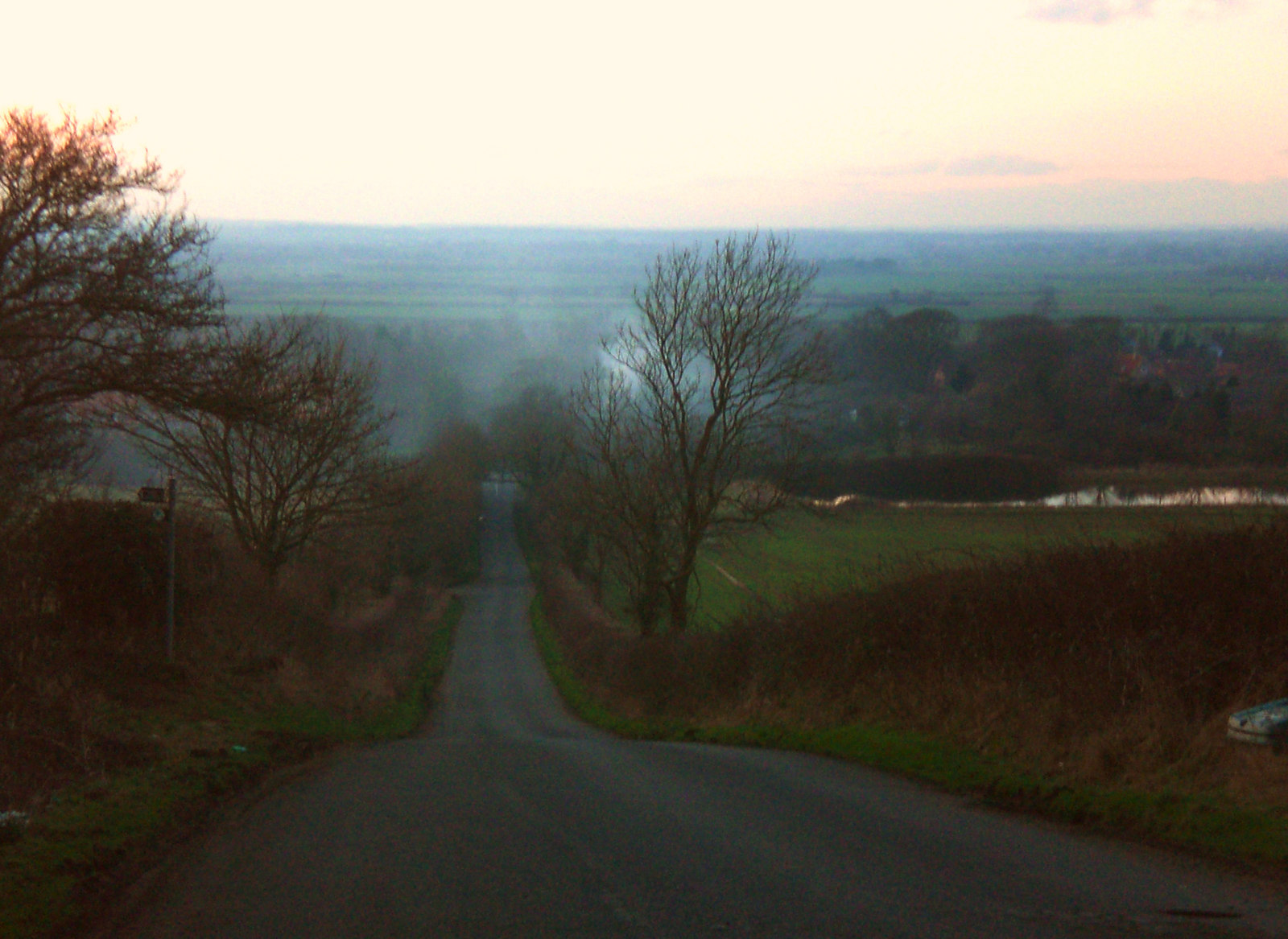
View from Lincoln Cliff above Welbourn (2009)

The scarp is formed by resistant Jurassic age rocks, principally the Lincolnshire Limestone Formation, and is remarkable for its length and straightness. However it is modest in height, rising about 50 metres or less above the surrounding landscape. It runs for over 50 miles from the Leicestershire border near Grantham to the Humber Estuary, and is broken only twice by river gaps at Ancaster and Lincoln, through which the rivers Slea and Witham respectively flow.

To the west of the Cliff north of Lincoln lies the River Trent, with the valley of the Witham to the west south of Lincoln. The top of the Cliff is followed by two historically significant roads. Closely following the escarpment is an ancient trackway, loosely known as the Jurassic Way, which in large parts now consists of the A607 south of Lincoln and the B1398 to the north. The second road is the Roman Ermine Street, the modern A15, that runs parallel a few miles to the east of the Edge.

== Geology ==
One of several west-facing scarps within the county, Lincoln Cliff or Edge is formed from a series of sedimentary rocks which dip very gently to the east. The older rocks to the west of the scarp are of Early Jurassic age whilst those to the east are of Middle Jurassic origin;

- Inferior Oolite Group (Middle Redbourne Group)(Middle Jurassic epoch)
  - Lincolnshire Limestone Formation (Lincolnshire Limestone)
  - Grantham Formation (Lower Estuarine Beds) / Northampton Sand Formation
- Lias Group (Lower Jurassic epoch)
  - Whitby Mudstone Formation (Upper Lias or Coleby Mudstones)
  - Marlstone Rock Formation (Marlstone Rock Bed)
  - Charmouth Mudstone Formation (Middle Lias or Coleby Mudstones)

Parts of this sequence of rocks have gone by different names in the past indicated above by italicised names in brackets, and these continue to be found in older geological literature and maps. The Charmouth Mudstones form the lower ground to the west and the lowest part of the "cliff" whilst the Lincolnshire Limestone forms the plateau surface to the east of the scarp.

The two gaps in the ridge at Lincoln and at Ancaster are interpreted as indicating the former course of the eastward flowing proto-Trent. The river flowed from the Nottingham area towards the North Sea via the Vale of Belvoir and the gap in the ridge at Ancaster. At a later stage it used the Lincoln Gap before assuming its present northerly course to join with the Yorkshire Ouse to form the Humber.

== List of cliff villages ==
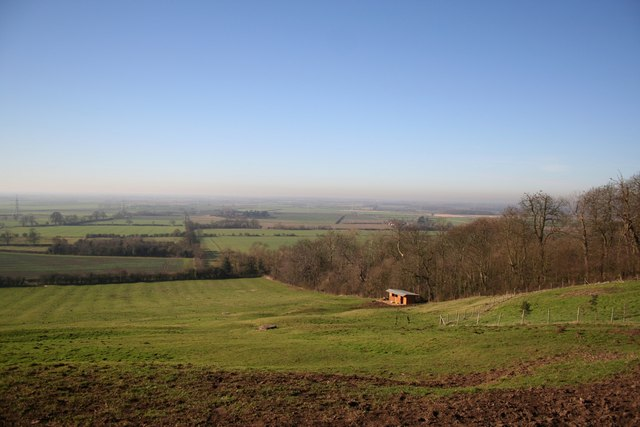
Looking west from Coleby south of Lincoln

North of Lincoln the term "Cliff" is used to refer to the entire ridge of Jurassic Limestone, not just its steep western scarp, preserving an obsolete sense of the word "cliff", which could historically refer to a hillside as well as a precipitous rock face.. This can be seen in placenames such as Welton Cliff, Saxby Cliff and Caenby Cliff, reflecting parish-based divisions of the ridge.

From north to south the "towns, villages and city (Lincoln)" are as follows along the cliff, most of them between Lincoln and Grantham are linked together by the A607, which closely follows the cliff:

- Winteringham, on the bank of the Humber
- Winterton
- Roxby
- Burton upon Stather
- Scunthorpe (Town)
- Kirton in Lindsey (Town)
- Grayingham
- Blyborough
- Willoughton
- Hemswell
- Harpswell
- Glentworth
- Fillingham
- Ingham
- Cammeringham
- Brattleby
- Aisthorpe
- Welton Cliff
- Welton
- Scampton
- North Carlton
- South Carlton
- Burton by Lincoln
- Lincoln – the "Lincoln Gap"; a break in the Edge (River Witham) (City)
- Canwick
- Bracebridge Heath
- Waddington
- Harmston
- Coleby
- Boothby Graffoe
- Navenby
- Wellingore
- Welbourn
- Leadenham
- Fulbeck
- Caythorpe
- Normanton
- Carlton Scroop
- Ancaster – the "Ancaster Gap"; a break in the Edge (River Slea)
- Honington
- Barkston
- Syston
- Belton
- Londonthorpe
- Manthorpe
- Grantham (Town)
