= Thorold baronets of Marston (1642) =

Baronetcy in the Baronetage of England

Coat of arms of the Thorold baronets of Marston
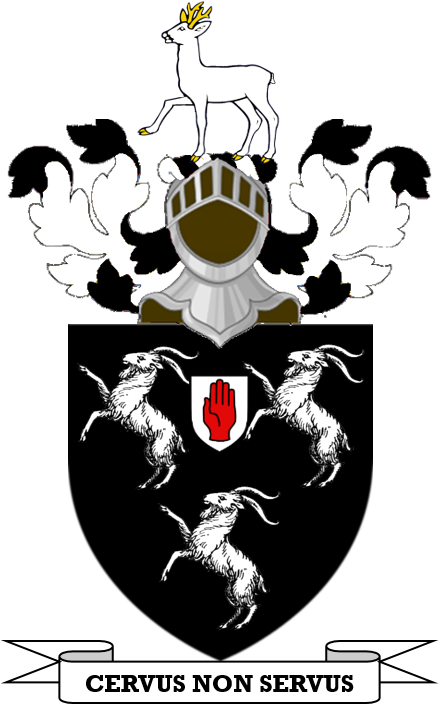
- Crest: A roebuck passant Argent attired Or
- Shield: Sable three goats salient Argent
- Motto: Cervus Non Servus (The Stag Is Not A Slave)

The Thorold baronetcy, of Marston in the County of Lincoln, was created in the Baronetage of England on 24 August 1642 for William Thorold. He fought as a Royalist in the Civil War and represented Grantham in the House of Commons after the Restoration.

The 4th Baronet sat as Member of Parliament for Grantham and Lincolnshire. The 9th Baronet was Member of Parliament for Lincolnshire.

The 10th Baronet was a noted book collector, as his father had been. The 12th Baronet represented Grantham in Parliament. The 15th Baronet was a captain in the Royal Navy and leader of the Lincolnshire County Council. As of 2026 the Official Roll marks the title "dormant".

The family seat was at Syston Park, near South Kesteven, Lincolnshire.

== Thorold baronets, of Marston (1642) ==
- Sir William Thorold, 1st Baronet (c. 1591–1678)
- Sir William Thorold, 2nd Baronet (c. 1659 – c. 1681)
- Sir Anthony Thorold, 3rd Baronet (c. 1663 – 1685)
- Sir John Thorold, 4th Baronet (c. 1664 – 1717)
- Sir William Thorold, 5th Baronet (died c. 1720)
- Sir Anthony Thorold, 6th Baronet (c. 1710 – 1721)
- Sir John Thorold, 7th Baronet (1675–1748)
- Sir John Thorold, 8th Baronet (1703–1775)
- Sir John Thorold, 9th Baronet (1734–1815)
- Sir John Hayford Thorold, 10th Baronet (1773–1831)
- Sir John Charles Thorold, 11th Baronet (1816–1866)
- Sir John Henry Thorold, 12th Baronet (1842–1922)
- Sir John George Thorold, 13th Baronet (1870–1951)
- Sir James Ernest Thorold, 14th Baronet (1877–1965)
- Sir Anthony Henry Thorold, 15th Baronet (1903–1999)
- Sir Anthony Oliver Thorold, presumed 16th Baronet (born 1945)

The heir apparent is the present holder's son Henry Lowry Thorold (born 1981).

== Extended family ==
- The family first came to Marston through the marriage of Sir Richard Thorold with the heiress of the de Marston family in the middle of the fourteenth century, in the middle of the fourteenth century,
- Anthony Wilson Thorold, second son of the Rev. Edward Thorold, third son of the 9th Baronet, was Bishop of Rochester and Bishop of Winchester.
- The family name is commonly pronounced "Thurrald", though the late Rev. Henry Croyland Thorold insisted on the pronunciation "Thorough". He was the son of the Rev. Ernest Hayford Thorold, a grandson of the 9th Baronet.
