= Lower Estuarine Series =

Geologic formation in England

The Lower Estuarine Series is an obsolete term for a thin sequence of fine-grained clastic sediments of Jurassic age, which are now called the Grantham Formation. The rocks of this formation form a lower part of the (Bajocian) Inferior Oolite Group, of Middle Jurassic age. In central England, it normally lies above the Northampton sand and below the Lower Lincolnshire Limestone Member.

The group is found in the East Midlands of England and was formed when the London-Brabant Island was drifting through the low northern latitudes, in conditions represented today by the Sahara Desert. The formation is often only around 2 - 5 metres thick.
