= John Thorold =

John Thorold may refer to:

- John Thorold (died 1700), Member of Parliament (MP) for Grantham 1685–1689
- Sir John Thorold, 4th Baronet (c.1664–1717), MP for Grantham and Lincolnshire
- Sir John Thorold, 9th Baronet (1734–1815), MP for Lincolnshire
- Sir John Thorold, 12th Baronet (1842–1922), Conservative MP for Grantham

== See also ==
- Thorold Baronets
