= William Thorold =

William Thorold may refer to:

- William Thorold (engineer), English engineer and architect
- William Thorold (died by 1594), MP for Grantham
- Sir William Thorold, 1st Baronet, his son, English landowner and politician, MP for Grantham
