= Thorold baronets of Harmston =

Coat of arms of the Thorold baronets of Harmston
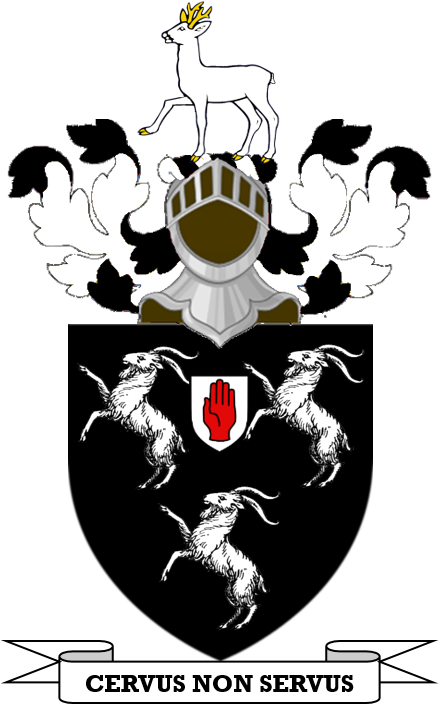
- Crest: A roebuck passant Argent attired Or
- Shield: Sable three goats salient Argent
- Motto: Cervus Non Servus (The Stag Is Not A Slave)

The Thorold baronetcy, of Harmston in the County of Lincoln was created in the Baronetage of Great Britain on 9 September 1709 for George Thorold. The title became extinct on the death of the 2nd Baronet in 1738. A second creation on 14 March 1740 was for Nathaniel Thorold, a "distant cousin" of the 2nd Baronet. The title became extinct on his death in 1764.

== Thorold baronets, of Harmston (1st creation, 1709) ==
- Sir George Thorold, 1st Baronet (c.1666–1722)
- Sir Samuel Thorold, 2nd Baronet (died 1738)

== Thorold baronets, of Harmston (2nd creation, 1740) ==
- Sir Nathaniel Thorold, 1st Baronet (died 1764). He had inherited the Harmston estate from the 2nd Baronet of the 1st creation. A special remainder, to Charles Thorold, a remote cousin, third son of the 7th Baronet of the 1642 creation, came to nothing and the title became extinct.

== Notes ==
Baronetage of Great Britain
Preceded by Elwill baronets	Thorold baronets of Harmston; 9 September 1709	Succeeded by Brown baronets
Preceded by Drury baronets	Thorold baronets of Harmston; 14 March 1740	Succeeded by Wynn baronets
