= Sproxton Quarry =

Quarry in Leicestershire, England

Coordinates: 52.817°N 0.719°W

- Site of Special Scientific Interest
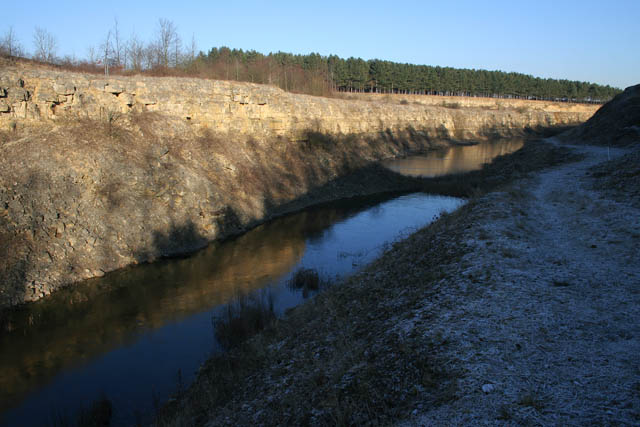
- Location of Sproxton Quarry.
- Area of search: Leicestershire
- Grid reference: SK 863 252
- Interest: Geological
- Area: 5.4 hectares (13 acres)
- Notification date: 1986
- Location map: Magic Map

Sproxton Quarry is a 5.4 hectares (13 acres) geological Site of Special Scientific Interest north-east of Sproxton in Leicestershire. It is a Geological Conservation Review site.

The quarry exposes one of the most complete sections of the Middle Jurassic Lincolnshire Limestone Formation, together with the underlying Grantham and Northampton Sand Formations. It has rare ammonites. Sproxton Quarry is a Reference Section for the Grantham Formation.
