= Adam Brown of Blackford =

Scottish merchant

Adam Brown of Blackford (c.1660–1711) was a Scottish merchant who served as Lord Provost of Edinburgh.

== Life ==
He lived in Blackford, south of Edinburgh.

In 1710 he succeeded Sir Patrick Johnston as Lord Provost. He died in office in October 1711 and was replaced by Sir Robert Blackwood of Pitreavie.

== Baronetcy ==
The Brown baronetcy, of Edinburgh in the County of Midlothian, was created in the Baronetage of Great Britain on 24 February 1710 for "Robert Brown, Lord Provost of Edinburgh". George Edward Cokayne stated that either this Adam Brown was meant, or the baronetcy is questionable.

== Family ==
He is possibly grandfather or great-grandfather of the later Lord Provost Walter Brown who was a wine merchant.

Baronetage of Great Britain
Preceded by Thorold baronets	Brown baronets of Edinburgh; 24 February 1710	Succeeded by Lambert baronets
