= Sir John Thorold, 4th Baronet =

English politician

Sir John Thorold, 4th Baronet (1664 – 14 January 1717) of Marston Hall and Cranwell, Lincolnshire was an English politician. He was a Member of Parliament representing either Grantham or Lincolnshire in a number of parliaments between 1697 and 1715.

Thorold was born in 1664 to Anthony Thorold and his wife Grisel, daughter of Sir John Wray, 2nd Baronet. Grandson of Sir William Thorold, 1st Baronet, he succeeded to the baronetcy after the death of his two brothers William and Anthony, the second and third baronets respectively, both in 1685.

He attended St John's College, Cambridge and then Lincoln's Inn. He was elected Member of Parliament for Grantham in the 1697 by-election, sitting until 1701. He then represented Lincolnshire until 1708, before representing Grantham between 1711 and 1715.

He married Margaret (née Waterer), widow of Francis Coventry, in 1701 at Westminster Abbey. He died without children on 14 January 1717 and was buried at Syston, Lincolnshire. He was succeeded by his cousin William as fifth baronet, son of the first baronet's third son John.

Baronetage of England
Preceded by Anthony Thorold	Baronet (of Marston); 1685–1717	Succeeded by William Thorold
