= Widmerpool (disambiguation) =

Widmerpool is a village and civil parish in Nottinghamshire, England.

Widmerpool may also refer to:

- Widmerpool Gulf, a geographical trough which existed as open water during the Lower Carboniferous (Tournaisian Age)
- Robert Widmerpool (died 1588), English martyr
- Kenneth Widmerpool, later Lord Widmerpool, the anti-hero of Anthony Powell's series of novels A Dance to the Music of Time
