= Sir Anthony Thorold, 15th Baronet =

English Royal Navy officer

Captain Sir Anthony Thorold Bt OBE DSC* DL
- Born: 7 September 1903
- Died: 1 May 1999 (aged 95)
- Spouse: Jocelyn (m. 1939; died 1993)
- Children: Three
- Military career
- Allegiance: United Kingdom
- Branch: Royal Navy
- Service years: 1917–1956
- Rank: Captain
- Commands: HMS Dryad; HMS Widemouth Bay; HMS Dacres
- Conflicts: Second World War
- Awards: Officer of the Order of the British Empire; Distinguished Service Cross & Bar

Captain Sir Anthony Henry Thorold, 15th Baronet, OBE, DSC & Bar, DL (7 September 1903 – 1 May 1999), was an English Royal Navy officer, public servant, and councillor. He served as Captain of HMS Dryad from 1951 to 1952, and was Commodore in Charge, Hong Kong, from 1953 to 1955. After retirement, he turned to public service and politics, serving as High Sheriff of Lincolnshire for 1968 and as Leader of Lincolnshire County Council from 1973 to 1981.

== Early life and education ==
Thorold was born on 7 September 1903 to Sir James Thorold, 14th Baronet, and his wife Katharine Thorold (née Tindal-Atkinson). He would succeed his father to the Thorold baronetcy in 1965. He was educated at Royal Naval College, Osborne, and at Royal Naval College, Dartmouth.

== Career ==
=== Naval career ===
Thorold joined the Royal Navy in 1917. He was regraded from acting sub-lieutenant to sub-lieutenant on 30 August 1924. He was promoted to lieutenant on 30 May 1926. He qualified as a navigating officer in 1928. He was promoted to lieutenant commander on 30 May 1934. He attended and passed the staff course at the Royal Naval College, Greenwich, in 1935.

At the beginning of the Second World War, from 1939 to 1940, Thorold served with the Mediterranean Fleet and the Home Fleet. He was promoted to commander on 30 June 1940. From 1941 to 1943, he was Staff Officer Operations to the Flag Officer Commanding Force H (James Somerville then Henry Harwood). Between 1944 and 1945, he was assigned to Western Approaches Command and served in command of various Escort Groups. He was captain of HMS Dacres from April 1945 to early 1946.

Thorold was promoted to captain on 31 December 1946. From January 1949 to 1950, he was senior officer of the Fishery Protection Squadron, and commanding officer of HMS Widemouth Bay. From December 1950 to January 1953, he was captain of HMS Dryad, a stone frigate that was home to the Royal Navy's Navigation and Direction School. From July 1953 to June 1955, he served as Commodore in Charge of Hong Kong. He was a Naval Aide de Camp to The Queen from 7 July 1955 to 7 January 1956.

Thorold retired from the Royal Navy on 7 January 1956. Due to his high rank, he was allowed to continue to be addressed as captain.

=== Public service ===
On 2 June 1959, Thorold was commissioned as a Deputy Lieutenant (DL) to the Lord Lieutenant of Lincolnshire. In 1961, he was appointed a Justice of the Peace (JP) for Kesteven. On 4 March 1968, he was appointed High Sheriff of Lincolnshire: the appointment is held for one year.

Thorold also held a number of voluntary chairmanships: Grantham Hospital Management Committee (1963 to 1974), Lincoln Diocesan Trust and Board of Finance (1966 to 1971), and Community Council of Lincolnshire (1974 to 1981).

=== Political career ===
From 1958 to 1974, Thorold was a county councillor for Kesteven. From 1973 to 1981, he was Leader of Lincolnshire County Council.

== Personal life ==
In 1939, Thorold married Jocelyn Elaine Laura Heathcote-Smith. She was the daughter of Sir Clifford Heathcote-Smith, a British diplomat and Royal Navy officer. Together they had three children: one son and two daughters. Their son Anthony Oliver Thorold would succeed to his father's title.

Thorold died on 1 May 1999. His wife predeceased him, dying in 1993. He is buried in the churchyard of St Mary's Church, Syston, Lincolnshire.

== Honours ==
In the 1942 King's Birthday Honours, Thorold was appointed an Officer of the Order of the British Empire (OBE). On 25 August 1942, he was awarded the Distinguished Service Cross (DSC) "For bravery and enterprise while serving in H.M. Ships, Transports and Royal Fleet Auxiliaries in the successful operations which led to the surrender of the important base of Diego Suarez". On 19 June 1945, he was awarded a bar to his Distinguished Service Cross "For outstanding courage, determination and skill while serving in H.M. Ships Nairana, Campania, Lark, Ainwick Castle, Onslow, Onslaught, Cygnet, Whitehall, Orwell, Zambesi, Zealous, Zest and Opportune, and H.M.C.S. Sioux, in escorting a convoy to and from North Russia under continuous and fierce attacks by the enemy and in exceptionally hard weather conditions."

Baronetage of England
Preceded by James Ernest Thorold	Baronet (of Marston); 1965–1999	Succeeded by Anthony Oliver Thorold
