= Anthony Thorold (MP) =

16th-century English politician

Sir Anthony Thorold or Tharrolde (by 1520 – 26 June 1594), of Marston and Blankney, Lincolnshire, was an English lawyer and politician.

Thorold was born in or before 1520, the eldest son of William Thorold (died 1569) and Dorothy, daughter of Thomas Leke of Halloughton, Nottinghamshire. He was admitted to Gray's Inn in 1537, becoming Recorder of Grantham soon after 1550, which he probably held until his death. With the support of Henry Manners, 2nd Earl of Rutland, he became the Member (MP) of the Parliament of England for Grantham in 1558. The following year, again with Rutland's support, he became Recorder of Lincoln (which he resigned in 1570) and was elected MP for Lincoln.

He was Sheriff of Lincolnshire between 1571 and 1572 and was appointed a Deputy Lieutenant by 1584. He was knighted in 1585.

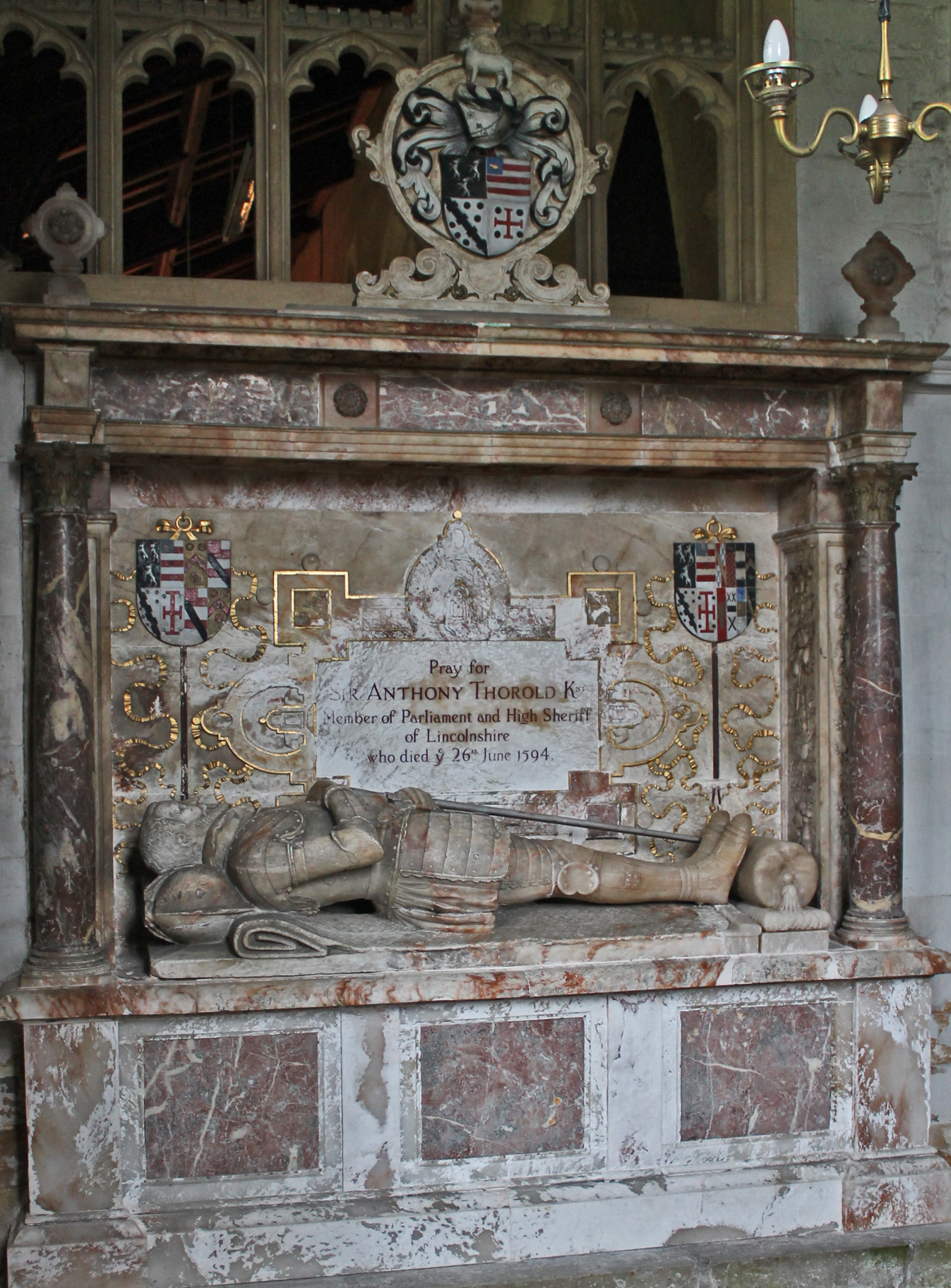
Tomb of Sir Anthony Thorold in Marston church

He married Margaret, daughter of Henry Sutton of Wellingore, and they had four sons and two daughters including Thomas (died 1574) and William (died by 1594). After Margaret's death, he married Anne, widow of George Babington and daughter and coheir of Sir John Constable of Kinoulton, Nottinghamshire. They had one daughter, Winifred.

Thorold died on 26 June 1594 and was buried at the church in Marston.
