= Barkston =

Village in Lincolnshire, England

Coordinates: 52.9628°N 0.6149°W

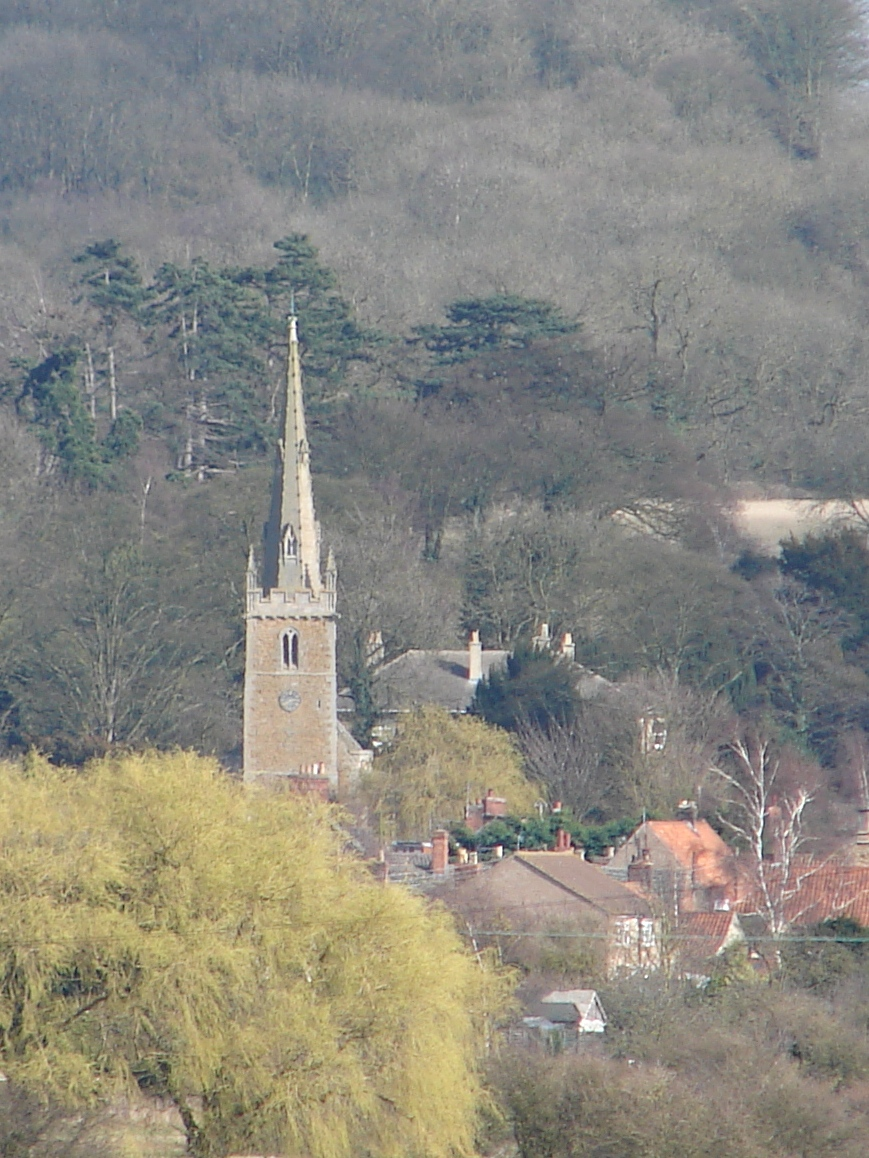
- The spire of Barkston church

- Location within Lincolnshire
- Population: 497 (2001 census)
- OS grid reference: SK930415
  - London: 100 mi (160 km) S
- Civil parish: Barkston
- District: South Kesteven
- Shire county: Lincolnshire
- Region: East Midlands
- Country: England
- Sovereign state: United Kingdom
- Post town: Grantham
- Postcode district: NG32
- Dialling code: 01400
- Police: Lincolnshire
- Fire: Lincolnshire
- Ambulance: East Midlands
- UK Parliament: Sleaford and North Hykeham

Barkston is an English village and civil parish in the South Kesteven district of Lincolnshire. The parish population was 497 at the 2001 census and 493 at the 2011 census. The village lies about 4 miles (6 km) north of the market town of Grantham, on the A607, just south of the junction with the A153 to Ancaster.

== History ==
The village is named in the Domesday Book as "Barchestune", which probably means "the farmstead of a man called Barkr." The deserted medieval village of Ringsthorpe lay just to the west of Barkston, on the far side of the River Witham.SK927414 It is mentioned in the 1087 Domesday Book. The latest archaeological discoveries at the site are from the Medieval period, and the last documentary mention of Ringsthorpe is in the 14th century.

Hickson's Almshouses, built in 1640 and re-built in 1839, still provide homes for local elderly people.

In 1947 Stan Laurel and Oliver Hardy visited the Old Plough Inn, a public house in the village, which was owned and managed by younger Laurel's sister, Beatrice, who was also known as Olga. date=10 May 2026 Barkston railway station, closed in 1955, was near the Barkston South junction of the East Coast Main Line and Sleaford railways.

=== Military history ===
During the Second World War, Arthur Lowe, the actor who played the main character in the television series Dad's Army, was stationed at Barkston with the Royal Army Ordnance Corps, which had the task of servicing searchlights.

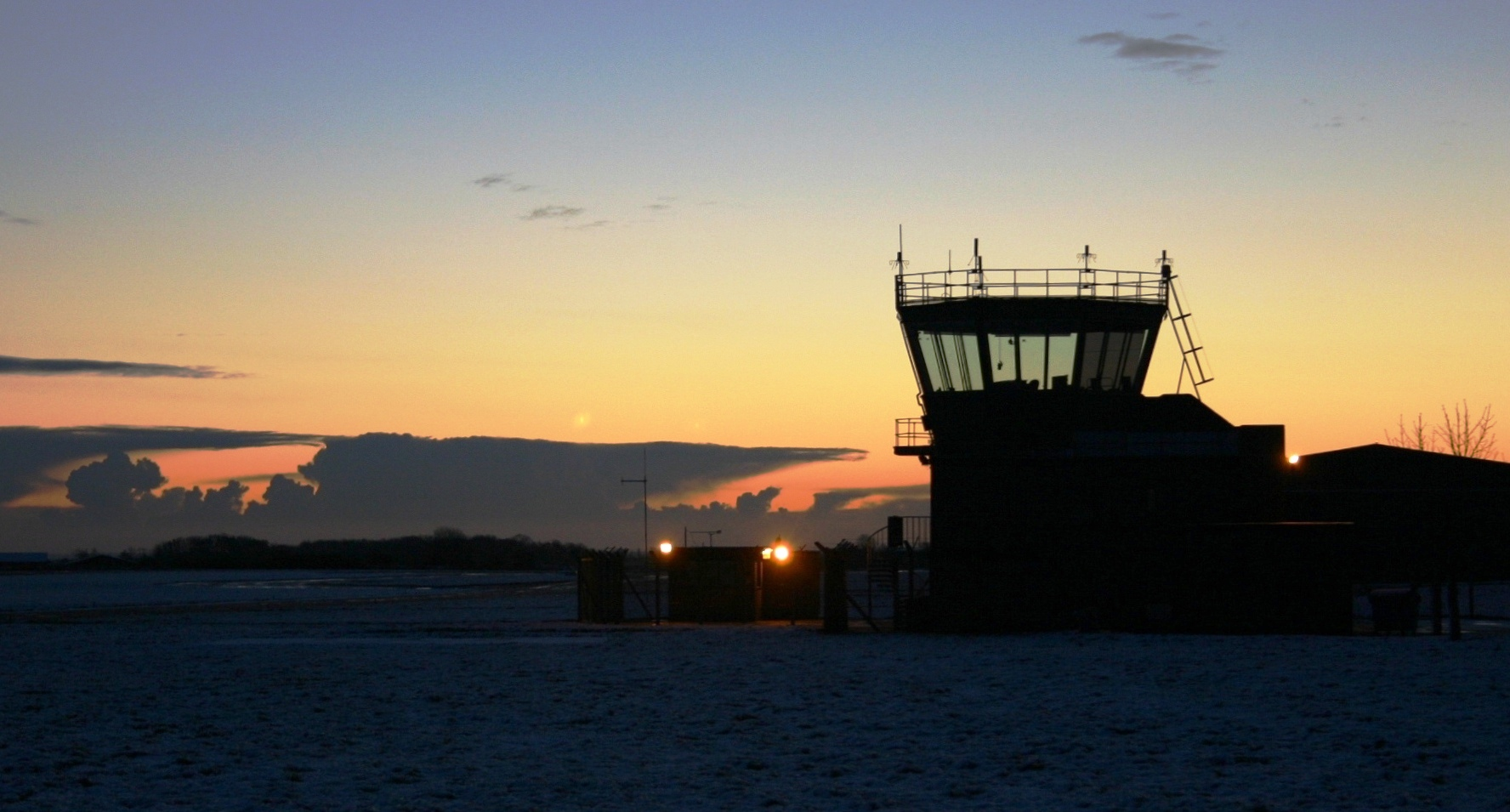
RAF Barkston Heath tower

RAF Barkston Heath was in recent years the base of the Joint Elementary Flying Training School (RAF and Fleet Air Arm) in 1995; the Army Air Corps joined in 1996, so that it became the Defence Elementary Flying Training School in 2003, when the RAF withdrew. Now the 703 Naval Air Squadron and 674 Squadron Army Air Corps are parts of the RAF's No. 3 Flying Training School. The airfield is also used for the British Model Flying Association national championships. In June 2003, the BBMF moved to Barkston Heath for four months.

== Geography ==
The present route of the A607 through the village dates from the 1930s. The River Witham passes through the west of the village. At the 2001 census there were 229 households, 100 per cent of the population were white, 87 per cent declared themselves to be Christian, and 20 per cent of the population were retired.

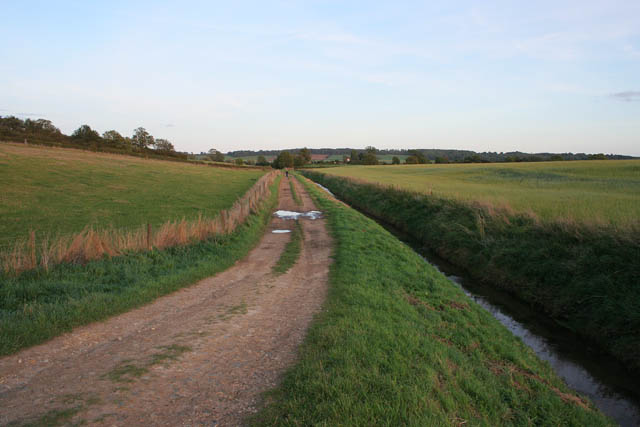
Viking Way

To the east, on top of the Jurassic limestone escarpment, RAF Barkston Heath stands next to the course of the Roman Road Ermine Street.

The parish boundary crosses the A607 at the north end of Syston bypass. Going south, it then crosses the River Witham, the north side of Hambleton Hill, and the East Coast Main Line at Shire House to the west. North are the Barkston South railway junctions, unused since 2004, either side of Westfield Farm. The boundary follows the north edge of Hurn Wood to meet Marston. Northwards it crosses the Grantham Avoiding Line at Sand Lane, then the East Coast Main Line, and follows the Viking Way eastwards to meet Hougham and the Witham south of Frinkley Plantation. At Far Hill, it leaves the Viking Way, passing north through Old Gorse Wood to the west of the former Barkston Gorse Farm and Frinkley Lane. Eastwards it touches Carlton Scroop and at the hilltop Honington at Spellar Wood, following its southern edge.] To the south-west it crosses Frinkley Lane, the Viking Way, Hough Road along the southern edge of Grove Plantations, and the Grantham–Sleaford railway line. It crosses the A607 at the A153 junction and Minnetts Wood north of Heath Farm, tops Honington Heath to meet Ancaster, and runs across RAF Barkston Heath. Along Ermine Street (B6403 road) it meets Wilsford and North Kesteven, and is briefly the South Kesteven boundary. At the southern edge of Barkston Heath, it follows Heath Lane westward and meets Syston. At this point a track passes through Minnett's Wood along Minnett's Hill.

== Community ==
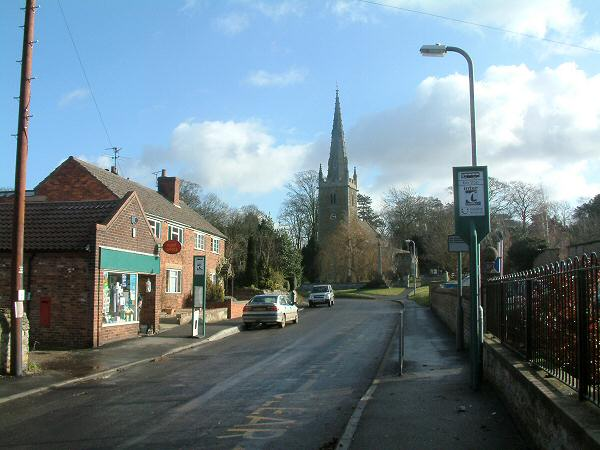
St Nicholas' Church

The ecclesiastical parish of Barkston belongs to the Barkston and Hough group in the Deanery of Loveden and Diocese of Lincoln. The incumbent since 2013 is Rev. Stuart Hadley.

The parish church is dedicated to Saint Nicholas of Myra, a philanthropist bishop from whom the legends and customs of Santa Claus derive. It includes a Norman window, a 14th-century spire and 15th-century porch.

The Methodist Chapel in West Street was built as a Wesleyan Methodist chapel in 1832. It closed in 2002, but the congregation continued to meet in the village hall as part of the Grantham and Vale of Belvoir Circuit until 2013.

The village pub is The Stag in Church Street, which also serves "locally sourced" food. A mobile library calls once a month, a mobile fish and chip van every Thursday, and a mobile greengrocer every Friday. There is a petrol station with a shop on the main road. Adjacent to it is a hand car wash and a mechanic's garage. The village has a primary school, catering for pupils aged 5-11 and is adjacent to the church. The school serves children from Barkston, Syston, Grantham and surrounding villages.

Barkston has Girl Guide and Brownie troops, and a mother-and-toddler group. A produce show is held every summer. The village has a cricket club, an indoor bowls team, and an association football team. The latter plays in the Grantham and District League Premier Division since finishing third in the 2007–2008 season in Division One.
