= Sir John Fryer, 1st Baronet =

Sir John Fryer, 1st Baronet (14 September 1671 – 11 September 1726) was a prominent Presbyterian layman, London pewterer, merchant and Lord Mayor of London. The baronetcy became extinct on his death in 1726. He was created a baronet on 13 December 1714.

"The King was pleased to make me a Barronett & my patent was ordered accordingly it bears date
This favour was conferred on me for my fidelity to the Protestant Succession in the House of Hanover & not laying down my Gown(?) when the Torie Ministry had made the Law against Occasional Conformity contrived on purpose to throw & exclude Dissenters out of Publick places."

== Biography ==
Born in Buckinghamshire, the son of Francis Fryer, he believed his family came from Oxfordshire and his grandfather (known as Francis Freer) settled in Little Marlow settling in the dissolved nunnery there called The Abbey and renting a farm of 50 acres. John was the only surviving child of his father's third wife, Susannah, daughter of maltster John Boulter, twice mayor of Abingdon, county town of Berkshire. Susannah's marriage portion had been £100 but her mother's brother was rich London merchant and baronet Sir John Cutler and when Cutler's heirs died young his estates fell back to his sister's numerous Boulter children.

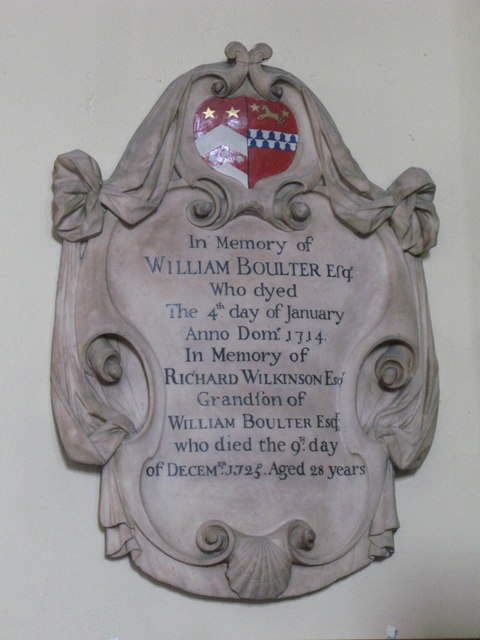
Haseley memorial St Nicholas Deptford

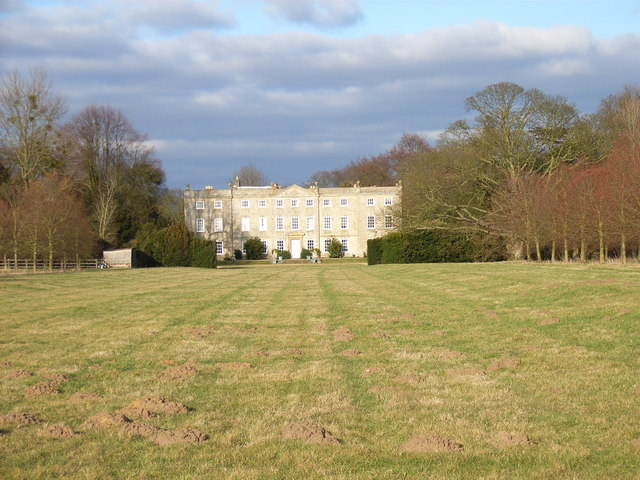
Haseley Court Little Haseley, Oxfordshire

These estates included Wimpole Hall in Cambridgeshire and Gawthorpe Hall and Harewood Castle near Leeds in Yorkshire, Little Haseley Oxfordshire, estates in Lincolnshire, the manor of Deptford near London, and estates in Hampshire Wherwell and Goodworth Clatford. Fryer was to receive Wherwell through his uncle Edmund Boulter, build a mansion there, Wherwell Priory, and make it his home. He was succeeded there by his Iremonger descendants.

John Fryer was a Pewterer by trade and (in his last few years so as to be eligible for the mayoralty) a member of the Fishmongers. He obtained election to Alderman of Queenhithe from 7 February 1710 retaining it until his death, and was created a baronet on 21 December 1714. He was a Sheriff of the City of London for 1715–16, and 386th Lord Mayor for 1720–21. The next year, he was Prime Warden of the Worshipful Company of Fishmongers. He was elected a director of the East India Company and the South Sea Company and inherited an estate at Wherwell, Hampshire.

He married three times. Katherine née Weedon died 12 November 1718 and Dorcas née Roberts 17 August 1723. He married thirdly Isabella Gerard on 11 March 1725 and she survived him.

In 1715 he began to enter in a small leather-bound ledger a note of the major events of his life making additions from time to time and he maintained this until near his end.

His only son who survived to adulthood, John Fryer by Katherine Weedon, died at Wherwell two years before him on 16 August 1724 aged 24. His daughter Delicia, by Dorcas Roberts, was adopted by Obadiah Hughes husband of her mother's sister, Delicia Roberts.

Sir John died in his 55th year of gout in the stomach at his seat at Wherwell on 11 September 1726 when the baronetcy became extinct. Presbyterian John Ball preached the funeral sermon. His widow married as his second wife, Henry Temple, 1st Viscount Palmerston, on 11 May 1738 at St Antholin, Budge Row.

== Timeline ==
- 14 September 1671, "on a Thursday at 4 in the afternoon" – birth at Well End, Little Marlow, Buckinghamshire. Nephew of Edmund Boulter. "The house being the second from the lane which goeth up to a place called Flackwell Heath".

attended the Grammar School in the parish taught by Minister Mr Thomas Beesly. "a very solid preacher and a good liver".

- 10 June 1685, Whitsuntide – sent to London to be improved in writing and accounts so might be fitted to be apprenticed to some trade.
- 1 March 1686 – bound to Mr Harford a pewterer in Bishopsgate (next house to corner house of Cornhill) for seven years.

"naturally of a weak constitution & being the only surviving child my dear mother had not inured me to any hard labour &, which was worse, in my infancy I had been cured of a rupture & I found such carrying or burdens strained which part and did me much hurt . . . my master put me on doing the servile part of the trade . . . not commonly done by other apprentices."

- 1 March 1692/1693 – "my time expired". 21 March made free, (yeoman), of the Worshipful Company of Pewterers, and soon after of the Citty of London.
- 1 April 1693 – uncle Edmund Boulter lends him money to purchase some £300 worth of goods on his own account.
- 15 April 1693 – great-uncle Sir John Cutler dies.
- 7 April 1696 – first marriage by Mr Meriton at St Nicholas Acons, London to Katherine Weedon 1677–1718, daughter of Nathaniel Weedon, gentleman, previously tanner, of Denham Buckinghamshire.
- 18 June 1696 – liveryman of the Pewterers' Guild.
- 1703 – steward of the Pewterers' Guild.
- 15 February 1708/1709 – uncle Edmund Boulter dies and Fryer "rashly" parts with his own business in Fenchurch Street ultimately receiving only part payment.

Boulter has left him his house in Prince's Street (to which Fryer moves his family) and, amongst other things, estates in Hampshire and Fryer soon starts building Wherwell Priory.

- 7 February 1710 – elected alderman of the City of London for Queenhithe held until his death in 1726.
- 20 September 1714 – comes up to London and rides in his place as Alderman when King George makes his Publick Entry through the City to St James's.
- 20 October 1714 – attends the King's Coronation and then dines with the King in Westminster Hall where a table was provided for the aldermen.
- 29 October 1714 – Lord Mayor's Day, his Majestie and family are invited to dine in the City.
- 21 December 1714 – created a baronet. Gazetted 16 November 1714
- 24 June 1715 – elected sheriff of London and the county of Middlesex. The year of the Jacobite rising.
- 26 July 1715 – elected Colonel of the Orange Regiment of Trained Bands but he did not accept it.
- 29 September 1715 – sworn sheriff at Guildhall and had the keys of the City's Prisons delivered to him (and Sir John Ward).
- 1715 – master of the Pewterers' Company.
- 26 November 1715 – appointed a commissioner for building 50 new churches in and about the cities of London and Westminster
- 24 February 1716 – attended Derwentwater and Kenmure (as Sheriff of London) on the scaffold "to see their heads chopt off".
- 12 November 1718 – wife, Katherine (Weedon) Fryer dies in London, buried at Wherwell.
- 9 April 1719 – director of the East India Company for the year ensuing.
- 19 July 1720 – translated (from Pewterers) to the Fishmongers' Company in order to qualify for the lord mayoralty.
- 27 July 1720 – second marriage at the Chapel in Lincoln's Inn to Dorcas Roberts ~1682–1723, daughter of Alderman Sir Gabriel Roberts 1629–1715 and Mary née Bulam, and granddaughter of Sir Lewis Roberts.
- 3 August 1720 – took (20-year-old) son John to Calais as it appeared he might have a consumption (and toured the great churches, convents and nunneries. It seemed a misery of a kingdom except their wine which was very good.)
- 6 September 1720 – commissioner for Salt.
- 29 September 1720 – elected Lord Mayor of London for the ensuing year. Elected midday 29 September 1720 (Michaelmas Day).
- 29 October 1720 – travelled by the City Barge to Westminster attended by the Livery Companies, took the oaths at the Exchequer Bar and returned by water as the Guns were fired divers times to Black Fryers (sic) and proceeded to Goldsmith's Hall where attended by the Lords Justices and the Privy Councillors. As he passed along there were loud acclamations of long live King George and Sir John Fryer. There were a few Jacobite incendiaries who had the insolence to hiss as his lordship passed along.
- 4 June 1721 – the Lady of Sir John Fryer, Lord Mayor of this city was delivered of a son and a daughter, Gabriel John and Dilitia.
- 28 October 1721 – at Guildhall surrendered to Sir William Stewart, lord mayor elect, the Chair and other Ensigns of Mayoralty.
- 30 October 1721 – at the installation of the new lord mayor there was a Tory mob who had the insolence to hiss the Rt. Honourable Sir John Fryer, the late Lord Mayor but they were well Drubbed.
- 1721–1722 – Prime Warden of the Fishmongers' Company.
- 16 August 1723 – second wife, Dorcas née Roberts dies, he narrowly recovers from the same illness.
- 5 February 1724 – elected a director of The South Sea Company.
- 16 August 1724 – son John dies aged 24 at Wherwell.
- 11 March 1724/1725 – third marriage to Isabella Gerard, daughter of Sir Francis Gerard 4th Baronet, at Lincoln's Inn Chapel by Mr Burroughs. She is a near relation to Sir Gerard Conyers, lord mayor of London.
- 11 September 1726 – died at Wherwell in his 55th year. Without surviving male issue being predeceased by three sons and one daughter.

He was survived by:

daughters by Katherine Weedon:

- Bithia Brassey 1698–1742, his eldest daughter, whose own daughter married Quaker Thomas Dimsdale MD, Baron of the Russian Empire
- Susannah Fryer 1712–1731, who died unmarried

daughter by Dorcas Roberts:

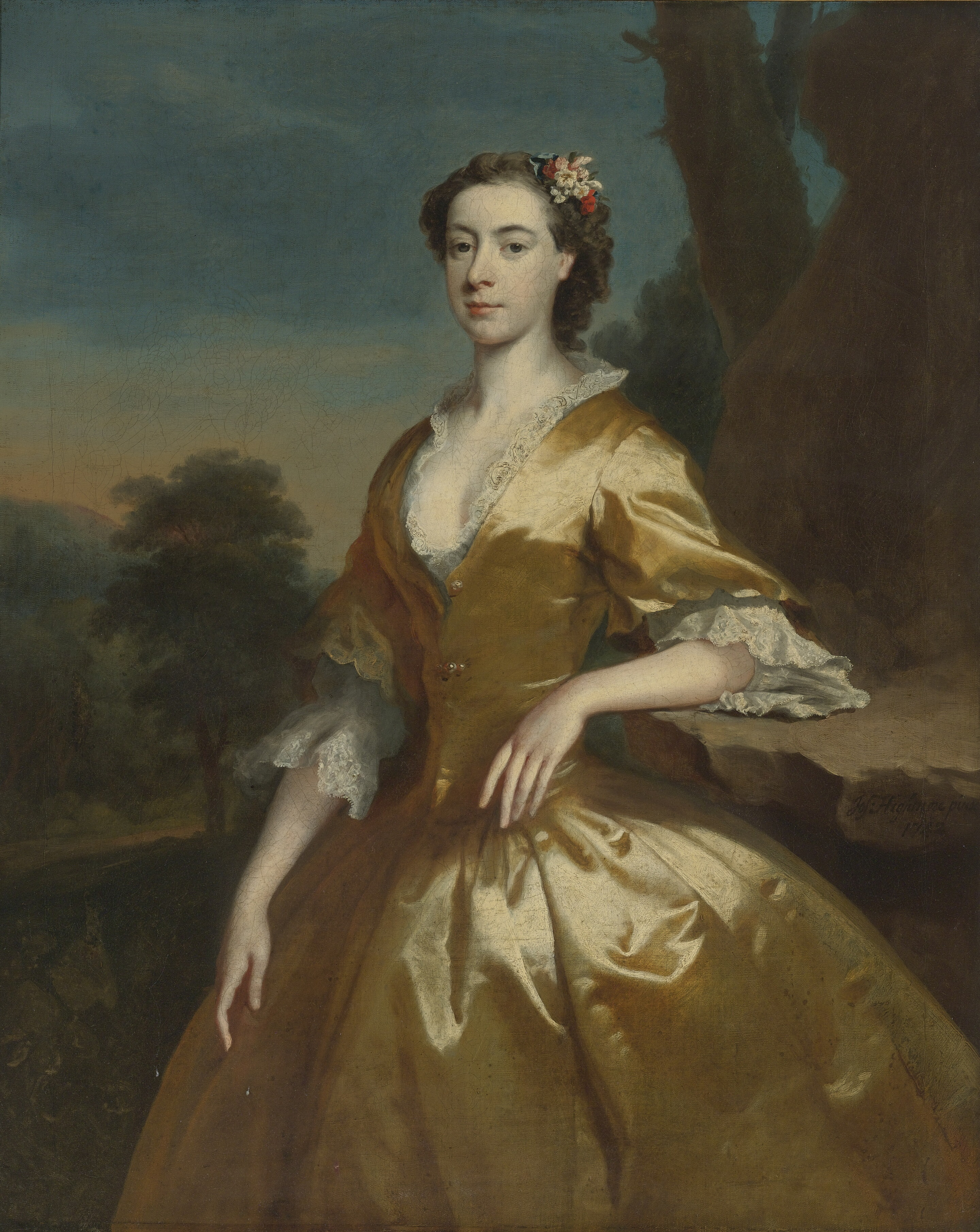
Delicia Fryer, Mrs. Joshua Iremonger, painting by Joseph Highmore, 1742.

- Dilitia Iremonger 1721–1744, whose descendants remained at Wherwell Priory

Some notable descendants:

- William Iremonger (1776–1852), nineteenth-century English colonel who erected the monument to Earl Athelwold of Wherwell
- Frederic Athelwold Iremonger, DD (1878–1952), eminent Anglican priest, radio broadcaster and Dean of Lichfield
- Harold Iremonger (1882–1937), Royal Marine officer and acting Governor of Saint Helena
- Anthony Eden, 1st Earl of Avon (12 June 1897 – 14 January 1977), Foreign Secretary and Prime Minister
- Thomas Iremonger (1916–1998), British Conservative Party politician

== Arms and crest ==
His coat of arms was Sable a chevron between three dolphins naiant Argent, a canton Ermine.

His crest was from a coronet Or, an heraldic antelope's head Argent, antlered and tusked, and tufted of the same.

== Notes ==
Civic offices
Preceded by Sir George Thorold, Bt	Lord Mayor of London; 1720–1721	Succeeded by Sir William Stewart
Baronetage of Great Britain
New creation	Baronet (of the City of London); 1714–1726	Extinct
Preceded by Page baronets	Fryer baronets of London; 21 December 1714	Succeeded by Lowther baronets
