= George Thorold =

English merchant

Sir George Thorold, 1st Baronet (c. 1666 – 29 October 1722) of Harmston, Lincolnshire, was an English merchant active in London. He served as Lord Mayor of London, Sheriff of London, and a Director of the Bank of England.

== Biography ==
Thorold was the fourth son of Charles Thorold, who had an ironmonger's business in London as well as an estate in Harmston, by his second wife, Anne Clarke, the daughter of George Clarke. He was born about 1666, and followed his father into the ironmongery business. He was elected an Alderman of the City of London for Cordwainer Ward on 3 May 1709, in succession to his elder brother, Charles Thorold, who was Sheriff of London 1705–06.

Thorold was created a baronet in the Baronetage of Great Britain on 9 September 1709, with a special remainder, if he had no sons, to his younger brother Samuel. Sir George was Sheriff of London, 1710–11, and Lord Mayor of London, 1719–20. Alexander Pope described his procession as Lord Mayor:

'Twas on the day when Thorold, rich and grave
Like Caesar, triumphed both on land and wave.

Thorold served as a Director of the Bank of England in 1711-16 and 1717-21.

Thorold married in 1713, Elizabeth Rushout, daughter of Sir James Rushout, 1st Baronet. He died without surviving issue in Bloomsbury Square, London, on 29 October 1722 aged 56 and was buried at Harmston on 11 November. His younger brother Samuel inherited the baronetcy, while his widow, Elizabeth, married secondly George Compton, 4th Earl of Northampton (as his second wife). Sir Samuel Thorold, 2nd and last Baronet, was High Sheriff of Lincolnshire, 1724–25. He died unmarried on 1 January 1738, and was buried at Harmston 18 days later. He left the estate at Harmston to his distant cousin Nathaniel Thorold, who was given a new baronetcy by King George II on 24 March 1741.

Civic offices
Preceded by Sir John Ward	Lord Mayor of London; 1719–1720	Succeeded by Sir John Fryer, 1st Baronet
Baronetage of Great Britain
New creation	Baronet (of Harmston); 1709–1722	Succeeded by Samuel Thorold
