= Market Weighton Axis =

The Market Weighton Axis is a geological feature which forms the south-eastern part of Yorkshire, England. The feature goes under a number of names such as 'block' or 'area' while the name of the town, Market Weighton is retained. 'Block' seems to be the most modern version but the most distinctive and widely known is 'axis'.

It takes the form of a ridge of tectonic uplift which has progressed during the period of deposition of the newer rocks from at least the end of the Triassic (205 million years ago) onwards. Its uplift has more or less kept pace with the deposition so that on the north and south sides of it, each stratum thins to nothing and in most cases, picks up again on the other side.

During the Carboniferous, the relationship between the Market Weighton Axis and the London-Brabant Massif affected the weaker rocks between them so influencing the geography at the surface. Features in the intervening district were the Widmerpool Gulf and the equatorial swamps which led to the deposition of the Nottinghamshire and Leicestershire coalfields.
