= Sir William Thorold, 1st Baronet =

English politician (1591-1678)

Sir William Thorold, 1st Baronet (1591–1678) was an English landowner and politician who sat in the House of Commons from 1661 to 1677. He fought for the Royalist cause in the English Civil War.

Thorold was the second son of William Thorold, of Marston, Lincolnshire and his wife Frances, daughter of Sir Robert Tyrwhitt, of Kettleby, Lincolnshire. He was admitted to Gray's Inn on 19 August 1610 and he was knighted on 3 August 1617. He succeeded his elder brother Anthony Thorold. He was Sheriff of Lincolnshire from 1632 to 1633 and was created baronet of Marston on 24 August 1642. In the Civil War, he fought for the King and suffered greatly as a result. His estate was sequestrated on 15 March 1643 and he was fined £4,160, on 1 December 1646.

In 1661, Thorold was elected Member of Parliament for Grantham in the Cavalier Parliament.

Thorold married Anne Blythe, daughter of John Blythe, of Stroxton, near Grantham, Lincolnshire.

Thorold died at the age of 86 in 1678. His two eldest sons, William and Anthony, predeceased him; Anthony's son William (died 1685) succeeded as second baronet, followed by his brothers Anthony (died 1685) and John (1664–1717) as third and fourth baronets respectively. John died without children and was succeeded as fifth baronet by William (died c. 1720), son of Thorold's third son John (died 1700).

Parliament of England
Preceded by Sir John Newton, Bt; Thomas Skipwith	Member of Parliament for Grantham; 1661–1677; With: Sir John Newton, Bt	Succeeded by Sir Robert Markham, Bt; Sir John Newton, Bt
Baronetage of England
New creation	Baronet (of Marston); 1642–1678	Succeeded by William Thorold
