= Lewes Roberts =

British merchant with the Levant Company and writer

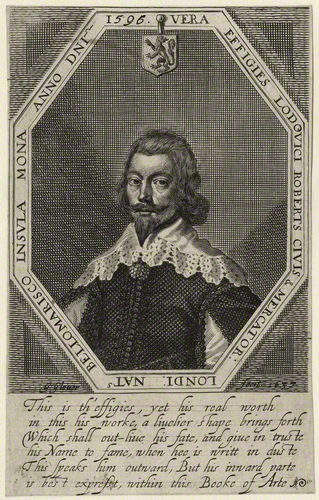
Sir Lewes Roberts.

Sir Lewes Roberts, also Captain Lewis Roberts (1596–1641), was an English merchant with the Levant Company and writer.

== Early life ==
Roberts, second son of Gabriel Roberts, a successful merchant by his wife Ann, daughter of John Hawarden of Appleton near Widnes, was born at Beaumaris, Anglesey, in 1596. Expecting to attend university but compelled 'by adverse fortune or cross fate' to devote himself to commerce he was apprenticed in 1612 to Thomas Harvey, a London overseas merchant and member of the Drapers. For Harvey Lewes Roberts visited such places as Newfoundland, Malaga, Algiers and Tunis and lived in France, Italy, the Ionian Islands, Constantinople and Asia Minor. After Harvey's death in 1623 while Roberts was in Asia Minor Harvey's brothers obtained for Roberts the freedom of the Levant Company. In 1625 he was admitted into the Merchant Adventurers at Delft and also joined the French company.

== City of London ==
The next year he married Anne, daughter of Edward Williamott, a mercer and later acquired Williamott's stock in the East India Company. In 1628 he became a captain in the Artillery Company – which provided officers for the trained bands – and the following year became a citizen of London joining the Drapers Company. In the Levant Company he was an assistant from 1630 to 1633 and its husband from 1633 to 1641. He was also a director of the East India Company for 1639–1640 but he fell ill at the time of the following election and he was not re-elected because he was, falsely, reported to have died.

He leased a town house in Threadneedle Street and a country house at Mason's Hill, Bromley, Kent.

== Author ==
Roberts had been well educated and had expected to attend university before he was obliged to be apprenticed to Harvey the overseas merchant. His first appearance in print was as the author of verses inserted at the front of friends' books, the first in 1633. He enjoyed the society of Izaak Walton and other literary men, and they returned the compliment in his own major work, The Merchants Mappe of Commerce, published 1638. An immediate success with the merchant community new editions were published until 1700.

== Economics ==
The Treasure of Traffike, or, A Discourse of Forraigne Trade was published in 1641, Roberts' closely reasoned analysis showing the benefits of the export trade and how imports supported local industry. Furthermore, he demonstrated that the re-export trade should not be taxed at all. Some protection for domestic manufacturers was advocated and his treatise continued to be cited for more than a century.

== Family ==
Roberts married Anne, daughter of Edward Williamott, mercer, of London, on 28 November 1626, at St Andrew Undershaft, London, Their children included:

- Sir Gabriel 1629–1715 (aged five in 1634) who was sub-governor of the African Company of Merchants and father-in-law of John Deacle, Presbyterian Minister, Obadiah Hughes and Sir John Fryer
- William 1633-1667, like his brother Gabriel, a leading assistant of both the Levant and Royal African Companies. Great-grandfather of Wenman Roberts Coke and patrilineal ancestor of the Earls of Leicester, 7th Creation.
- Sarah who married Peter le Piper
- Delicia who married John Nelson, a Turkey merchant and was mother of philanthropist and nonjuror Robert Nelson
- Anne who married George Hanger of Driffield Gloucestershire, was mother of John Hanger, governor of the Bank of England and Sir George Hanger, and grandmother of Sir George's son, Gabriel Hanger, 1st Baron Coleraine.

He died in London and was buried in St. Martin's Outwich on 12 March 1640/1641. His wife Anne, who died 24 February 1665, is buried beside him.

A portrait is prefixed to the first edition of the 'Merchants Mappe of Commerce.'

== Works ==
- The Merchants Mappe of Commerce; wherein the Vniversall Manner and Matter of Trade is compendiously handled, &c., London, 1638, fol. As one of the earliest systematic treatises on its subject in English, this gave Roberts a wide reputation; prefixed are commendatory verses by Izaak Walton; 3rd edit. enlarged, London, 1677, fol. … to which is annexed 'Advice concerning Bills of Exchange,' &c. [by T. Marins]; with … Engglands Benefit and Advantage by Foreign Trade, demonstrated by T[homas] Mun;' 4th edit. London, 1700, fol.
- Warre-fare epitomised, 1640, 4to.
- The Treasure of Traffike, or a Discourse of Forraigne Trade, &c. Dedicated to the High Court of Parliament now assembled,' London, 1641, 4to; reprinted in M'Culloch's Select Collection of Tracts on Commerce, &c., London, 1856, 8vo.
- Some verses by a 'Lod. Roberts,' probably the merchant, are prefixed to Fletcher's 'Purple Island' (1633)
