= Frogden Quarry =

Site of Special Scientific Interest in Dorset, England

Coordinates: 50.96305°N 2.50118°W

Frogden Quarry (grid reference ST649183) is a 0.2 hectare geological Site of Special Scientific Interest in Dorset, England, notified in 1954, by geologist Benjamin Starr. It exposes rocks of the Inferior Oolite, of Aalenian and Bajocian age. The sequence largely consists of limestone, with some marl and siltstone.

== Sources ==
- English Nature citation sheet for the site (accessed 31 August 2006)
