= Northampton Sand Formation =

Geological formation in England

Coordinates: 52.8313°N 0.5171°W

- Stratigraphic range: Aalenian 174–170 Ma
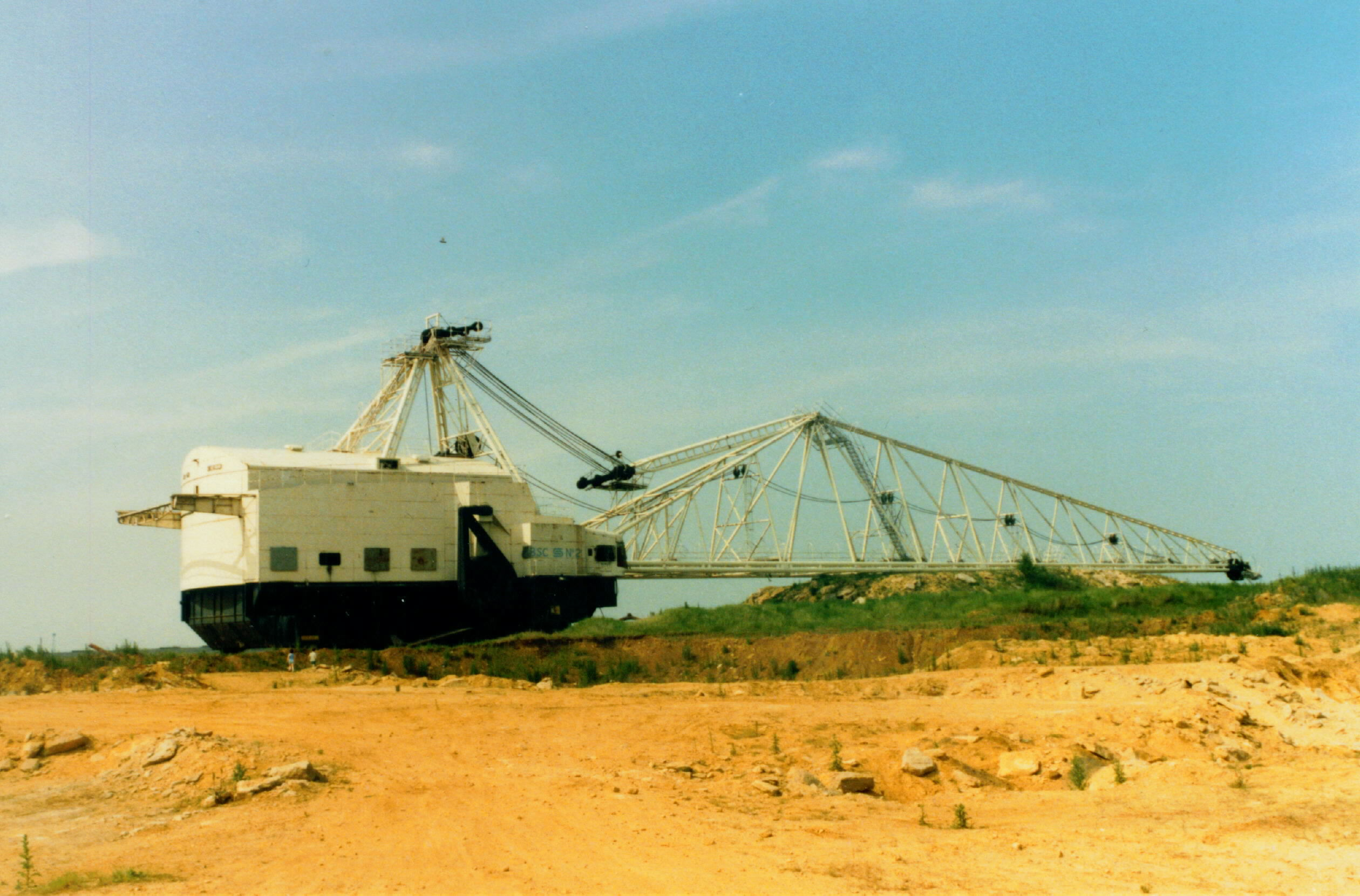
- Dragline opencast mining of the ironstone at Weldon, Northamptonshire.
- Type: Geological formation
- Unit of: Inferior Oolite Group
- Sub-units: Corby Ironstone Member, Duston Member (formerly Variable Beds)
- Underlies: Grantham Formation, Rutland Formation, Horsehay Sand Formation
- Overlies: Whitby Mudstone Formation
- Thickness: Up to 21 m, typically 4-8 m

Lithology
- Primary: Sandstone
- Other: Ironstone, Oolitic Limestone

Location
- Region: East Midlands
- Country: England
- Extent: Northamptonshire, Lincolnshire

Type section
- Named for: Northampton
- Named by: Sharp
- Location: Duston Top Pit
- Year defined: 1870
- Thickness at type section: 11.6 m

The Northampton Sand Formation, sometimes called the Northamptonshire Sand, is a geological formation in England dating to the Aalenian stage of the early Middle Jurassic which is placed within the Inferior Oolite Group. It was formerly worked extensively in Northamptonshire for its ironstone.

The Northampton Sand Formation constitutes the lowest formation of Inferior Oolite Group in the Midlands and lies upon Whitby Mudstone Formation, the uppermost unit of the underlying Lias Group. It attains a maximum thickness of up to 21 metres (69 ft) to the north and west of Northampton where it lies in a subterranean basin. In the south, it fades out around Towcester. Northward from the edge of the basin in the upper Lias, under Northampton, it underlies the Bajocian aged Lincolnshire Limestone Formation. A little to the north of Corby Glen (grid reference TF0027) it is at about 50 metres (160 ft) from the surface. It fades out under north Lincolnshire as the strata rise towards the Market Weighton Axis.

The formation predominantly consists of sandy ironstone, which when freshly exposed is greenish-grey in colour, which weathers to limonitic brown sandstone. It formed in an extensive, shallow sea on the northwestern margin of the London-Brabant Massif.

Fossils found in the formation include remains of an indeterminate sauropod dinosaur (previously attributed to Cetiosaurus and Brachiosauridae) known from fragments of the bones of the hip (pubis and possibly ischium) collected from near Harlestone in Northamptonshire and acquired by the Natural History Museum in London in 1916 (where it is held under the collection number PV R 9472), and which were subject to a thin sectioning histology study published in Nature in 1981. A species of horseshoe crab, Mesolimulus woodwardi has been described based on a fossil found in the Northampton Sand in the vicinity of Great Doddington near Wellingborough.

The formation is a significant emitter of radon gas, with a layer of relatively uranium rich (~ 20 ppm on average) phosphatic pebbles located in a 30 cm thick layer at the base of the formation being a particularly strong emitter, though significant levels of radon emanate from the whole of the formation.

== Commercial exploitation ==
There is a description of the twentieth century exploitation of the Northampton Sand for iron-smelting in the Wellingborough article.

== See also ==
- List of dinosaur-bearing rock formations
  - List of stratigraphic units with indeterminate dinosaur fossils

== Bibliography ==
- Kent, P. & Gaunt, G.D. British Regional Geology Eastern England to The Wash (1980) ISBN 0-11-884121-1
- Hains, B.A. & Horton, A. British Regional Geology Central England (1969) ISBN 0-11-880088-4
- British Geological Survey 1:50 000 Series. Stamford. Sheet 157 Solid & Drift Edition (1978)
