= Walter Brown (Lord Provost) =

Scottish wine merchant (1770 – 1840)

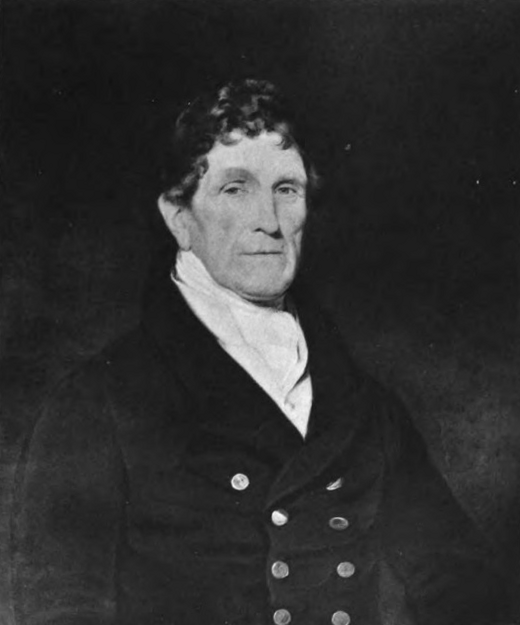
Walter Brown, Lord Provost of Edinburgh

Walter Brown (c.1770–c.1840) was a Scottish wine merchant who served as Lord Provost of Edinburgh from 1827 to 1829.

== Life ==
In 1810, "Walter Brown, merchant" is living at 3 Buccleuch Place in Edinburgh's South Side. It is unclear if this is Walter or his father.

He joined Edinburgh Town Council in 1815 and became a Baillie in 1817. In 1826 he was President of the Edinburgh Chamber of Commerce.

In 1825, he was running a wine and spirit shop at 19 Lothian Street under the name Walter Brown & Son.

In 1827, he succeeded William Trotter of Ballindean as Lord Provost of Edinburgh. His duties as Lord Provost included improvements to Leith Docks. He was then living at 41 Lauriston Place on the south side of Edinburgh close to George Heriot's School.

The most dramatic event in Edinburgh during his tenure were the Burke and Hare murders (1828). In architectural terms his most important act was the Edinburgh Improvement Act 1827 (7 & 8 Geo. 4. c. lxxvi) which conceived the Victoria Street connection from the Grassmarket, connecting to a new north-south road, George IV Bridge, which then connects the Royal Mile to Greyfriars Kirk and The Meadows. Victoria Street is a masterpiece of town planning. The Edinburgh Improvement Act 1827 also included a new western approach to the Royal Mile, climbing around the south side of Edinburgh Castle and now known as Johnston Terrace. The western connection in the plan, from Johnston Terrace to the west end of the Grassmarket, was never built.

He was succeeded as Lord Provost by William Allan of Glen in 1829.

Walter Brown & Son were still trading from Lothian Street in 1840 but gone by 1845.

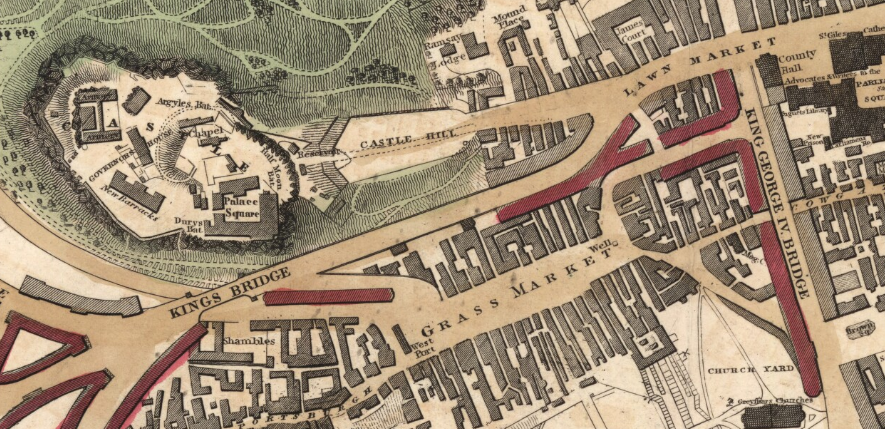
Streets to be created in the Edinburgh Improvement Act 1827.

== Artistic recognition ==
A full length silhouette by Augustin Edouart is held by the Scottish National Portrait Gallery.

His portrait in oils is held at Merchants Hall in Edinburgh.
