= London–Brabant Massif =

Ancient basement stretching from Rhineland to East Anglia

The London–Brabant Massif or London–Brabant Platform is, in the tectonic structure of Europe, a structural high or massif that stretches from the Rhineland in western Germany across northern Belgium (in the province of Brabant) and the North Sea to the sites of East Anglia and the middle Thames in southern England.

The massif also occurs in the Belgian subsurface, where it is bounded to the northeast by the Roer Valley Graben that runs diagonally through Dutch Limburg.

The Midlands Microcraton (southeastern Wales and part of western England) is often considered part of the massif and to reflect this the names Wales–Brabant Massif, Wales–London–Brabant Massif and Wales–Brabant High are sometimes used. This massif was also formerly referred to, at least in part, as St George's Land.

The London–Brabant Massif is part of the former microcontinent Avalonia. To the south it borders the Rhenohercynian Zone of the Hercynian orogeny. To the northeast it is flanked by the Anglo-Dutch Basin in the subsurface of the North Sea.

At times in geologic history the London–Brabant Massif formed an island, which is called the London–Brabant Island.

== Formation ==
Paleogeography of Europe during the Late Devonian, with the London–Brabant Massif the elongate region in grey east of the Welsh Massif

The massif is composed of crystalline basement (metamorphic and igneous rocks) with Proterozoic to early Paleozoic ages. It was deformed and metamorphosed during the Cadomian orogeny (Ediacaran, about 600 million years ago) and Caledonian orogeny (Silurian, about 420 million years ago). This basement is almost everywhere overlain by younger sedimentary rocks, except for some places in the southwest of England and in Wales.

The continent Avalonia was until the Ordovician (465 million years ago) part of the large southern continent Gondwana, but then began drifting independently to lower latitudes. As it passed through the dry latitudes represented today by the Namib Desert^{1}, it was eroded and the soils became laterite. The strata, particularly of the Precambrian are complex. Their continuity is also poorly understood because they are beyond the reach of most boreholes.

== Carboniferous period ==
The period from which the island has exercised most economic influence on modern Europe was the Carboniferous. As the continent was drifting past the Equator, on the island's shores, there grew a rich tropical forest swamp. On the island's southern shore, it left the Dinantian, Namurian and Westphalian coal fields of France, Belgium and western Germany. See Aachener Revier (in German).

To its northwest, the thinner crust between it and the Market Weighton Axis was crumpled between the blocks leaving low ridges of wet land between strips of water such as the Widmerpool Gulf. On the wet land, the coal fields of Leicestershire, Nottinghamshire and Derbyshire were deposited. These extend further east but are now at ever greater depth. At the modern east Yorkshire and north Lincolnshire coast for example, their upper surface is at about 2 km depth. These Carboniferous beds are part of a system linking with those of Westphalia, around the north side of the island. On the north Norfolk coast, the line of the Carboniferous shore roughly coincides with the modern one.^{2}

== The Permian and Triassic ==
As the continent drifted northwards, away from the Equator, through the latitudes represented today by the Sahara desert, the erosion was renewed. This time, the lateritic soils are represented by the New Red Sandstone and the red soils of Leicestershire and Rutland.

The early Permian was the time of the height of the Variscan earth movements as the crust to the south was crushed against the island. The great disturbances seen at the surface in Brittany, the Ardennes and the Rhineland also lie below the Paris Basin. They fade out in the gentler anticline of the downs and Weald of southern England which overlies the edge of the island. The axis of this anticline is normally called the northern Variscan front. However, the chalk of the downs is Upper Cretaceous, so the process continued well after the Permian. The point in the present context is that the stability of the island contrasts with the relatively unstable crust to its south, which was forced into a long mountain ridge.

To the north, economically important things were happening. Western Britain was pushed up as part of the Variscan Orogeny while the east of Britain, including the island began to subside leaving a broad basin, north of the island and south of Scandinavia. This formed a shallow sea in a very dry climate. Desert sands and salt basins were a result but there are also mudstones. This provided the alternating porous and impervious rocks which have trapped the gas escaping when the coal measures, below were subjected to geothermal heat. This has left a group of gas fields off the Norfolk coast. That is to say, off the coast of the island.

== Rhaetic transgression ==
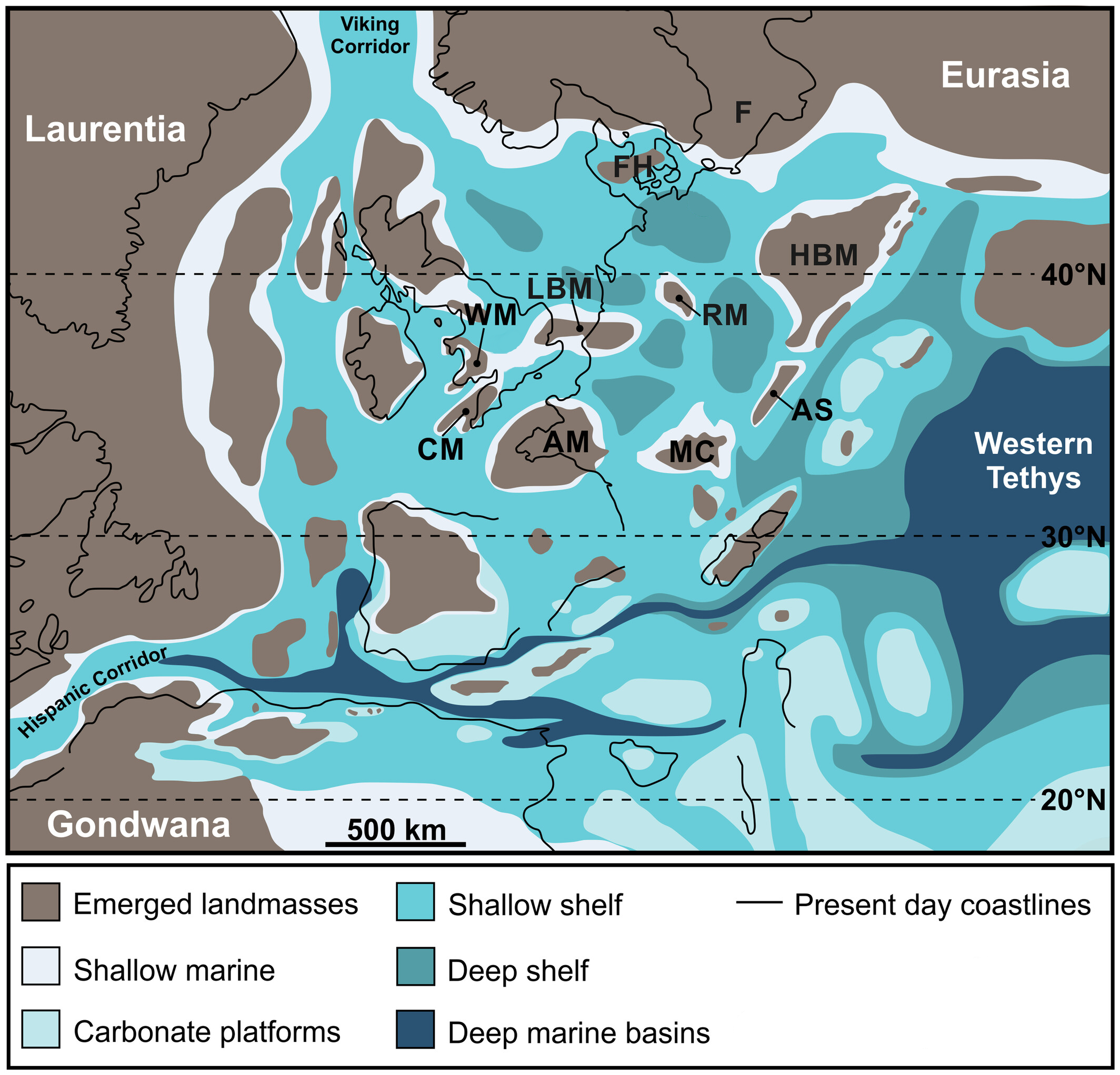
Map of Europe during the Early Jurassic (Toarcian), with the London Brabant Massif labelled LBM

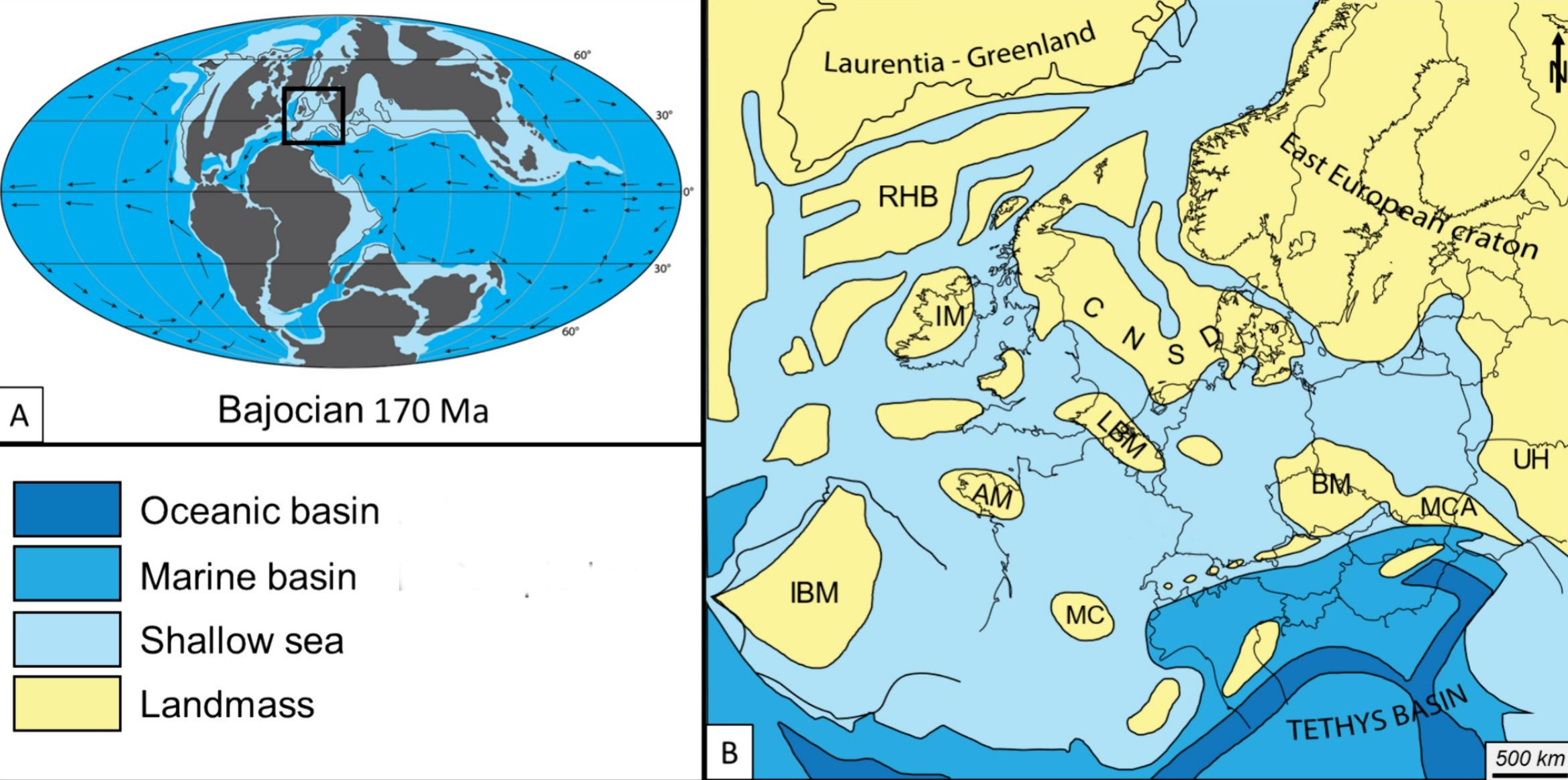
Map of Europe during the Bajocian stage of the Middle Jurassic, the London-Brabant massif is labelled "LBM"

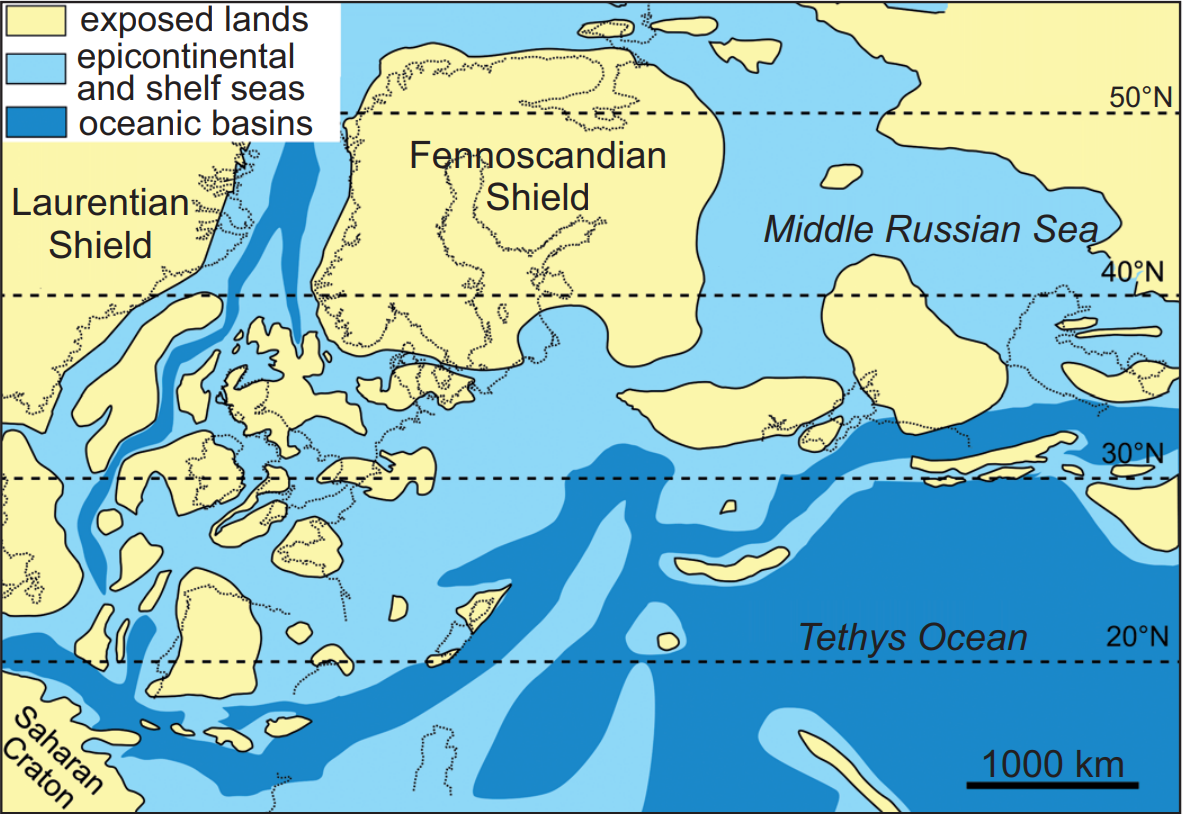
Map of Europe during the Middle-Late Jurassic boundary (late Callovian - early Oxfordian)

In the early Jurassic, the Rhaetic sea flooded much of the Permian plain. On the margin of the London–Brabant Island, the estuarine conditions which left the Lower Estuarine Series prevailed for a while before the sea rose so as to deposit the Lincolnshire limestones before falling again so that the Upper Estuarine Series was left. Again the sea rose to deposit the Blisworth Limestone, the Blisworth Clay and the Upper Jurassic clays.

The same general pattern occurred in France leaving the Paris Basin flooded from Anjou to Luxembourg.

== Cretaceous ==
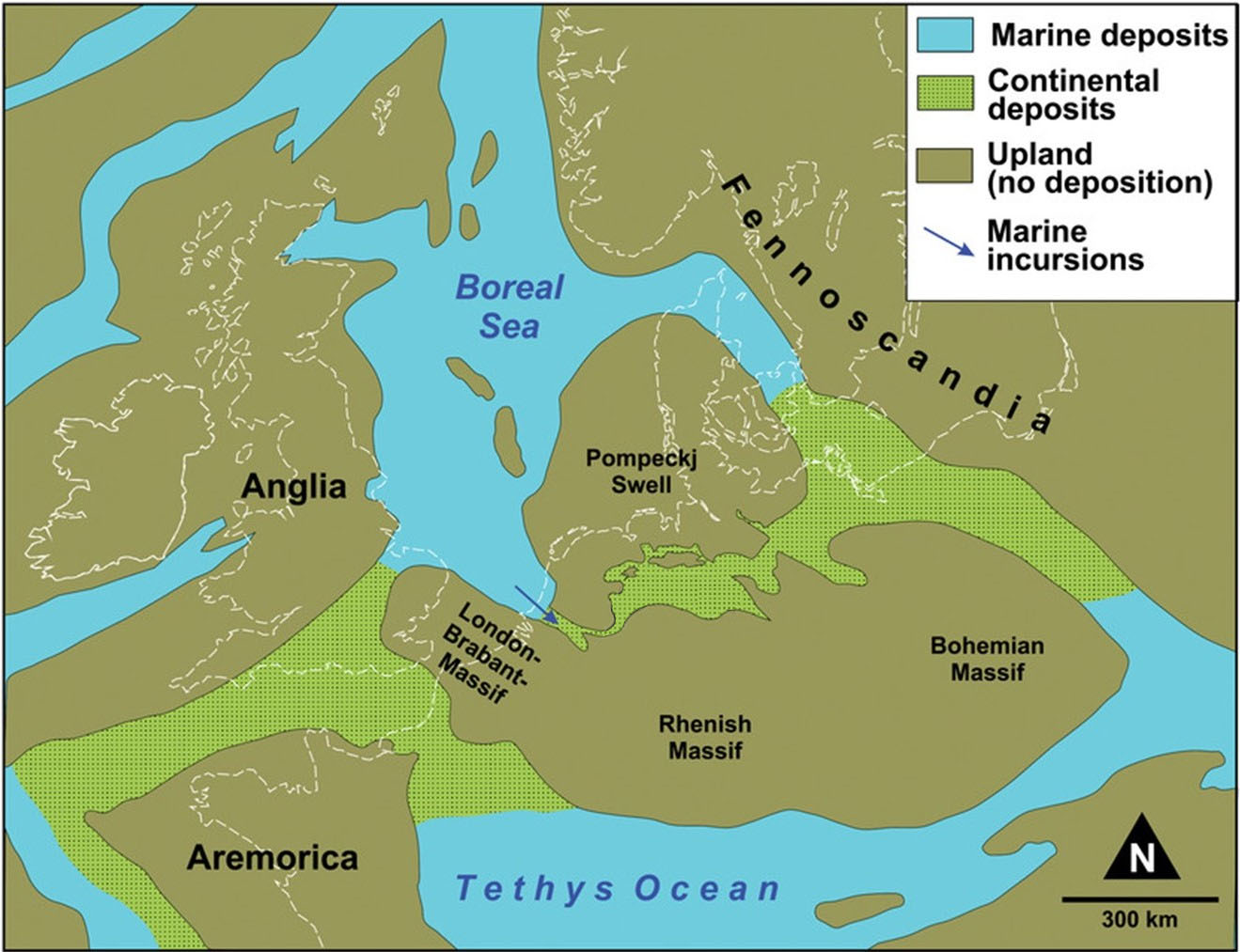
Map of Western Europe during the Early Cretaceous (Berriasian-Valanginian)

By the Cretaceous the island had sunk much further in relation to the sea level. Before the end of the period, the British end was buried in Upper Cretaceous chalk. This happened because the Pacific Ocean bed swelled up causing the world's seas to rise but also, the process released much carbon dioxide.

== Modern existence ==
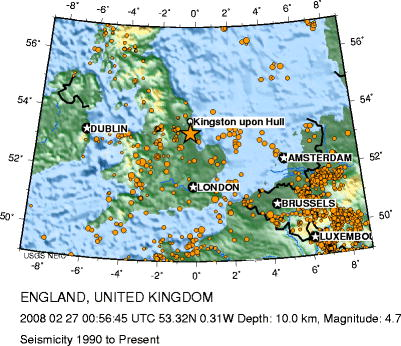
Seismicity in the United Kingdom from 1990 to 2008-02-27

It is now best viewed as a block of dense crust floating deeply sunk into the mantle and overlain with less dense superficial rocks. It depresses the boundary of the crust and the mantle (Mohorovičić discontinuity, commonly Moho) to depths greater than 40 kilometres as against a figure at the top of the continental shelf of about thirty and less than fifteen below oceanic depths.^{3}

The map shows that there is some tendency for such seismic activity as there is in the region to occur around the margin of the massif. It was into this pattern that the Dover Straits earthquake of 1580 and the 2008 Lincolnshire earthquake, the latter marked by an orange star, fell.

== See also ==
- Geologic time scale
- Proterozoic

== Footnotes ==
- Note 1: Reference to modern climate regions is intended to be helpful in envisaging events but although the basic climate zones persisted throughout the story, the changing configuration of the continents had a great and changing effect on the configuration of the climate zones.
- Note 2: Gallois, Figure 9 shows how the overlying strata lie in relation to it in north Norfolk.
- Note 3: Dercourt, Figure 6.2.

== Sources ==
- Bless M.J.M., Bouckaert J., Conil R., Groessens E., Kasig W., Paproth E., Poty E., Van Steenwinkel M., Streel M., Walter R. (1980). Pre-permian depositional environments around the brabant massif in Belgium, The Netherlands and Germany. Sedimentary Geology, Volume 27, Issue 1, pages 1–81. In: Pre-Permian Sedimentation in NW Europe, June 1980, doi:10.1016/0037-0738(80)90031-7.
- Cameron, T.D.J. et al. (1992). The Geology of the Southern North Sea. ISBN 0-11-884492-X.
- Dercourt, J. (2002). Géologie et Géodynamique de la France 3rd. edn. ISBN 2-10-006459-2.
- Dercourt, J. et al. Carte Géologique de la France à l'Échelle du Millionième. ISBN 2-7159-2158-6.
- Gallois, R.F. (1994). Geology of the Country around King's Lynn and The Wash. ISBN 0-11-884495-4.
- Glennie, K.W. ed. (1990). Introduction to the Petroleum Geology of the North Sea. 3rd. edn. ISBN 0-632-02711-8
