= William Thorold (died by 1594) =

English politician

William Thorold (died by 1594) was an English politician.

Thorold was the second son of Anthony Thorold and his first wife Margaret. Educated at Gray's Inn, he was justice of the peace for the Kesteven division and in 1584 was elected member (MP) of the Parliament of England for Grantham.

Thorold married Frances, daughter of Sir Robert Tyrwhitt of Kettleby, and they had two sons and six daughters, including Sir Anthony Thorold (Sheriff of Lincolnshire in 1617) and Sir William Thorold, 1st Baronet.
