= Thorold baronets of Hough-on-the-Hill (1644) =

Coat of arms of the Thorold baronets of Hough-on-the-Hill
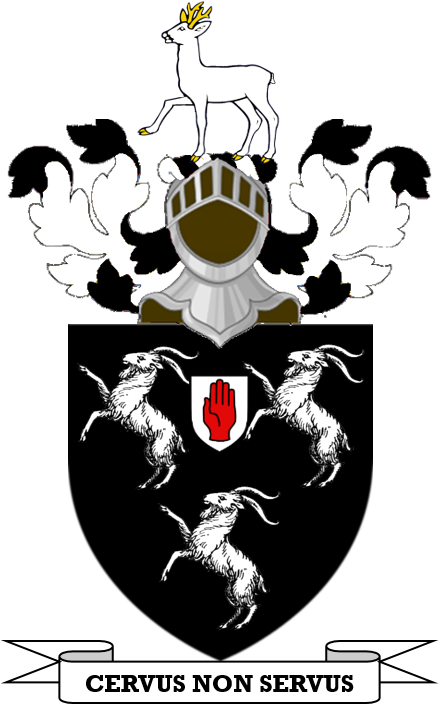
- Crest: A roebuck passant Argent attired Or
- Shield: Sable three goats salient Argent
- Motto: Cervus Non Servus (The Stag Is Not A Slave)

The Thorold baronetcy, of Hough-on-the-Hill in the County of Lincoln, was created in the Baronetage of England on 14 June 1644 for Robert Thorold. A Royalist, he had married around 1630 Katharine Roper, daughter of Christopher Roper, 2nd Baron Teynham.

The 2nd Baronet, a Catholic, was imprisoned in the Tower of London in 1792 for high treason. The title became extinct on the death of the 3rd Baronet in 1706.

== Thorold baronets, of Hough-on-the-Hill (1644) ==
- Sir Robert Thorold, 1st Baronet (died c. 1660)
- Sir Robert Thorold, 2nd Baronet (died c. 1695)
- Sir Robert Thorold, 3rd Baronet (died 1706)
