= Harmston =

Village and civil parish in the North Kesteven district of Lincolnshire, England

Coordinates: 53.1492°N 0.5457°W

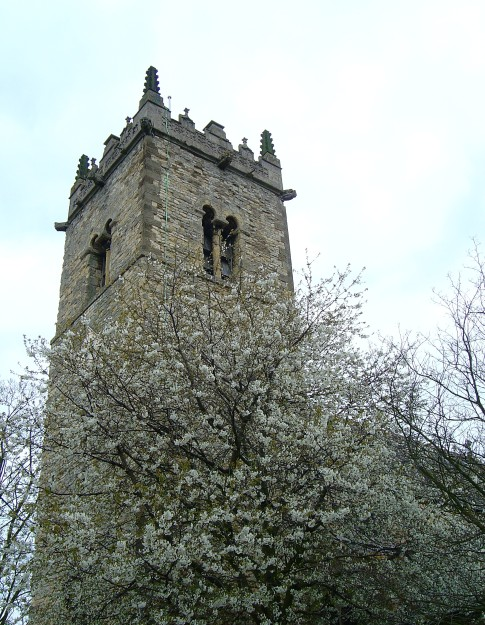
- All Saints' Church, Harmston

- Location within Lincolnshire
- OS grid reference: SK9762
  - London: 110 mi (180 km) S
- District: North Kesteven
- Shire county: Lincolnshire
- Region: East Midlands
- Country: England
- Sovereign state: United Kingdom
- Post town: Lincoln
- Postcode district: LN5
- Police: Lincolnshire
- Fire: Lincolnshire
- Ambulance: East Midlands
- UK Parliament: Sleaford and North Hykeham

Harmston is a village and civil parish in the North Kesteven district of Lincolnshire, England. It is situated just west off the A607, and 5 miles (8 km) south from the city and county town of Lincoln. It sits on the Lincoln Cliff overlooking the River Witham valley.

== History ==
The village is a documented settlement in the Domesday Book. The site of a toft, a settlement of small and relatively closely packed farms, lies towards the western end of Chapel Lane.

Harmston Hall was built as a manor house, totalling 20,800 square feet (1,930 m^{2}), in 1710 for Sir Charles Thorold, and in 1719 was the home of Sir George Thorold, Lord Mayor of London. In 1930 it became part of a mental health hospital complex, and functioned as the headquarters for the Lincolnshire Joint Board for Mental Defectives. The hospital closed in 1989, the site being redeveloped as a private residence.

Harmston remained a small village until the mid-1990s when the new owner of Harmston Hall, a local property developer, made plans for a housing development at the southern perimeter of the village on the former hospital site. The new housing estate, completed in 2006, brought in new people and has transformed Harmston from an agricultural to a mainly commuter village for workers in nearby Lincoln.

== Community ==
Harmston Anglican parish church is dedicated to All Saints. The village public house, The Thorold Arms, is situated close to the church.
