= Worshipful Company of Pewterers =

Livery company of the City of London

Coordinates: 51.51672°N 0.09511°W

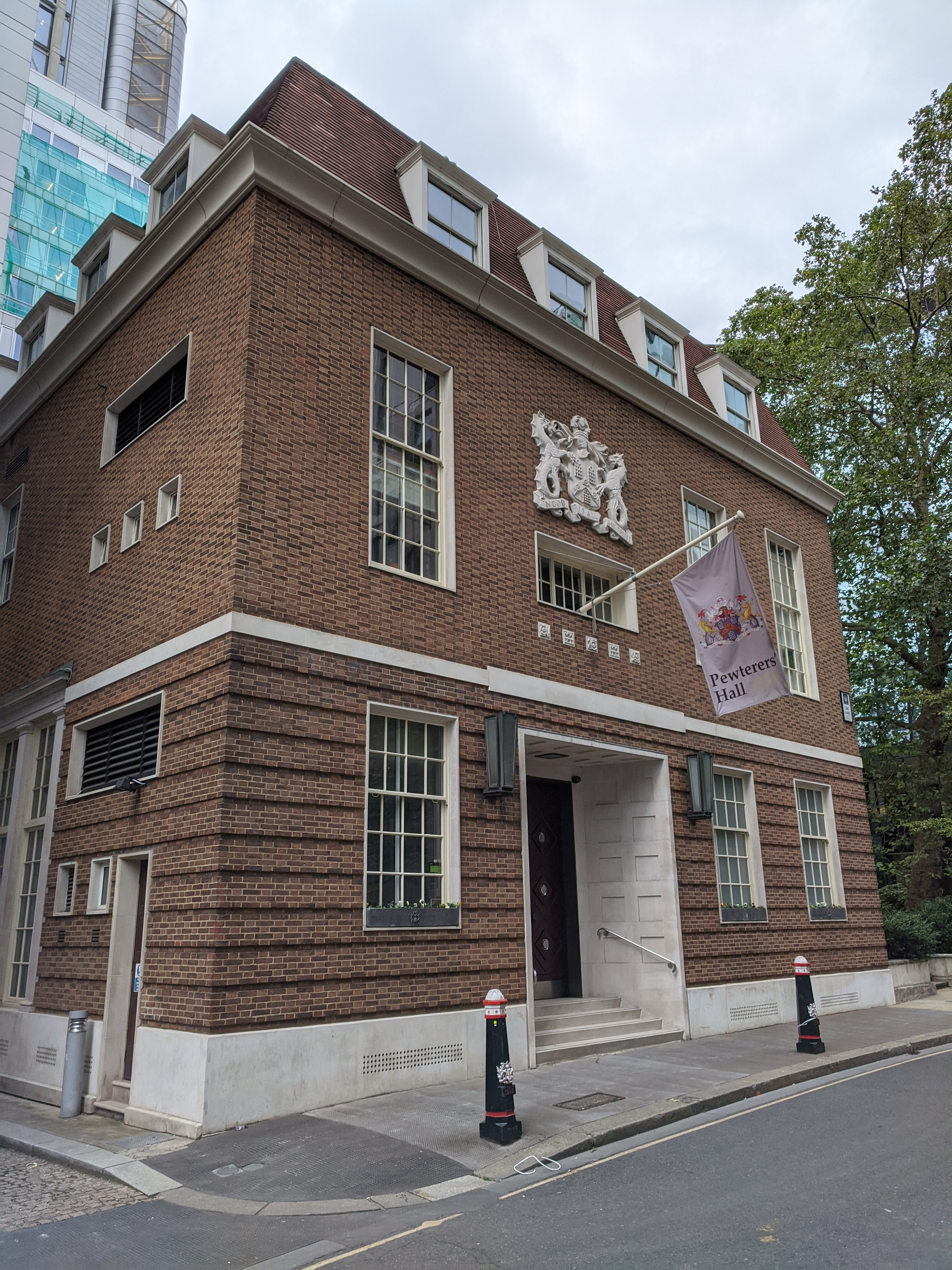
- Pewterers' Hall
- Motto: In God is all my trust
- Location: Pewterers' Hall, Oat Lane, London EC2
- Date of formation: 1348
- Company association: Metal industries
- Order of precedence: 16th
- Website: www.pewterers.org.uk

The Worshipful Company of Pewterers is one of the 114 Livery Companies of the City of London. It ranks 16th in the order of precedence of City Livery Companies and has existed since at least 1348. Like all the other City Livery Companies, the Worshipful Company of Pewterers has four main pillars of activity: Charitable endeavour, assistance to education, support for its trade and profession, and being a convivial and caring social community.

The Company has been based at Pewterers' Hall, Oat Lane, near London Wall, since 1961. It is its third livery hall, the first having been destroyed in the Great Fire of London and the second, also by fire, in 1840.

== Support for the pewter trade, profession and education ==
As a Livery Company, a cornerstone of the Pewterers' activity is to support its trade and professions, and inspire young craftspeople and those in education working with pewter. It annually runs Pewter Live, a three-day crafts exhibition, competition for craftspeople and those working with pewter, and shop selling pewter ware by leading manufacturers and craftsmen. Pewter is still a thriving UK industry, though smaller than the major industry it once was in centuries past.

== Charity ==
One of the original purposes of The Worshipful Company of Pewterers was for mutual help and charitable work; today the Company awards educational grants and supports a range of charitable causes through two Charitable Trusts: The 500th Anniversary Trust and The Seahorse Trust. The Company's two Charities currently give, in aggregate, some £200,000 in grants each year. All the grants are made within the UK and to UK registered charities. The Worshipful Company of Pewterers 500th Anniversary Trust is a registered charity in England and Wales: 267420. The Pewterers Seahorse Charitable Trust is a registered charity in England and Wales: 261889.

== Coat of arms ==
The earliest record of heraldic arms in use by the Pewterers' Company is dated 1451. These first arms depict a representation of the Assumption, recalling the Company's origin as a fraternity in honour of the Virgin Mary. The Pewterers, like other Livery Companies, found it politic to eliminate religious symbolism during the Reformation; thus, in 1533, new arms were granted, followed forty years later by its crest and supporters.

The Company's present arms are blazoned:

Arms: Azure on a Chevron Or between three antique Limbecks Argent as many Roses Gules.

Crest: A Mount Vert thereon two Arms embowed Proper vested Argent cuffed Gules holding in both Hands erect a Dish of the Third.

Supporters: Two Seahorses Or their Tails Proper.
