= Grantham Formation =

Geological formation in England, UK

- Stratigraphic range: Aalenian
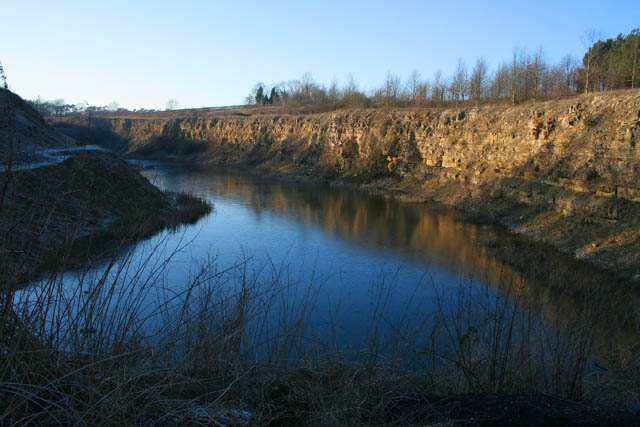
- Sproxton Quarry, a Reference Section for the Grantham Formation
- Type: Geological formation
- Unit of: Inferior Oolite Group
- Underlies: Lincolnshire limestone
- Overlies: Northampton Sand Formation, Whitby Mudstone Formation
- Thickness: 2 to 5 m, locally 15 m in channels

Lithology
- Primary: Mudstone
- Other: Sandstone

Location
- Region: England
- Country: United Kingdom

The Grantham Formation is a geological formation in England, which dates to the Middle Jurassic Aalenian age around 172 million years ago. It is composed of mudstones and sandstone, usually with abundant plant debris. It overlies the preceding Northampton Sand Formation and underlies the following Lincolnshire Limestone.

It is found from the Humber estuary to the Kettering/Peterborough area.
