= Inferior Oolite =

European Jurassic-age sedimentary rocks

Inferior Oolite Group
- Stratigraphic range: Aalenian–Bathonian (Middle Jurassic)
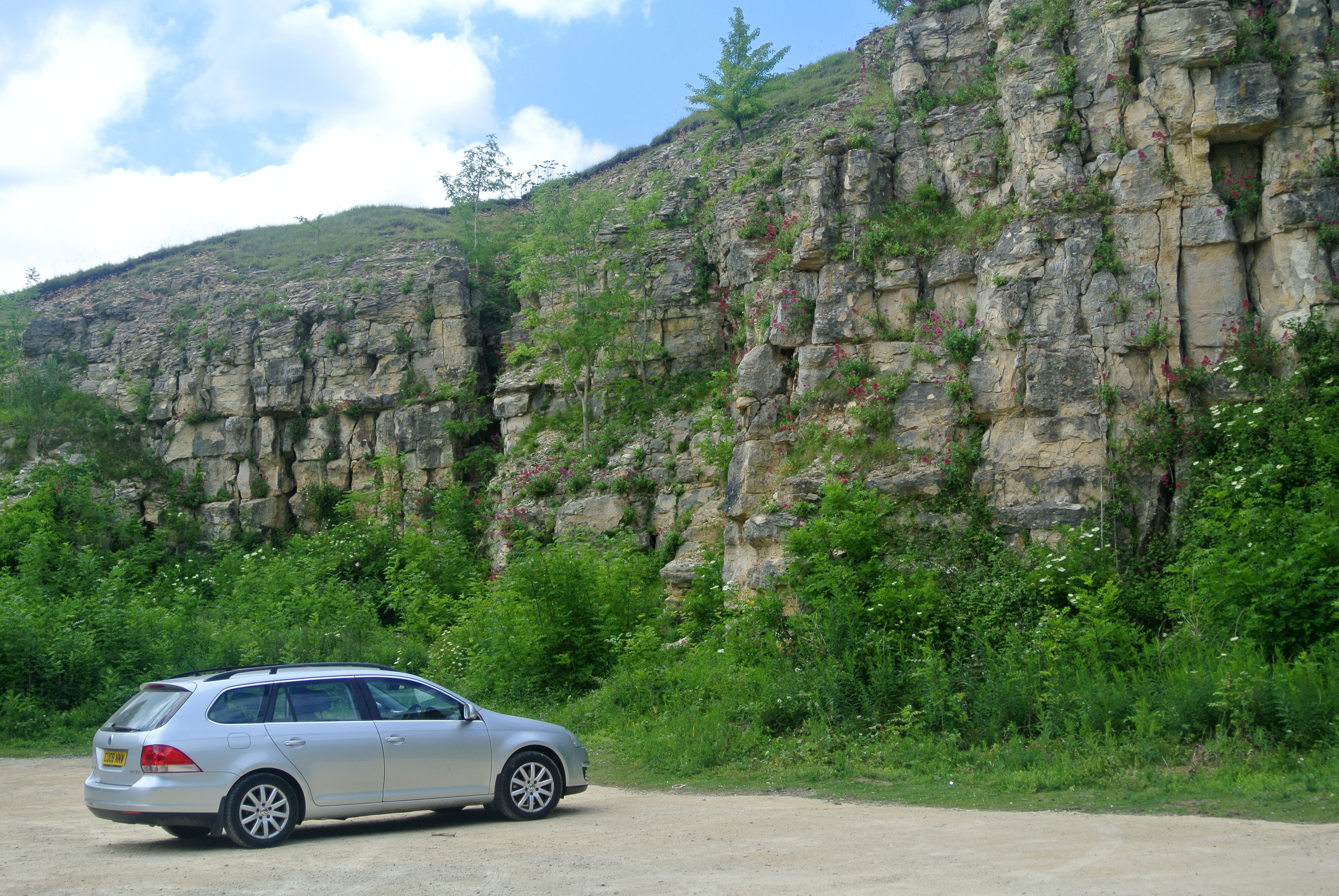
- Inferior Oolite at Leckhampton Hill, Gloucestershire.
- Type: Group
- Sub-units: East Midlands: Lincolnshire limestone; Grantham Formation; Northampton Sand Formation; Cotswolds: Salperton Limestone; Aston Limestone; Birdlip Limestone; Dorset -Lower, Upper Inferior Oolite Formations
- Underlies: Great Oolite Group
- Overlies: Lias Group
- Thickness: 0 - 120 m

Lithology
- Primary: limestones
- Other: sandstone, mudstone

Location
- Country: England

The Inferior Oolite is a sequence of Jurassic age sedimentary rocks in Europe. It was deposited during the Middle Jurassic. The Inferior Oolite Group as more recently defined is a Jurassic lithostratigraphic group (a sequence of rock strata) in southern and eastern England . It has been variously known in the past as the Under Oolite (or Oolyte), the Inferior Oolite, the Inferior Oolite Series and the Redbourne Group.

== Outcrops ==
The rocks are exposed from Dorset and Somerset eastwards and northwards through the English Midlands to Yorkshire. It is present at depth in the Wessex-Weald Basin, where it reaches its greatest thickness of 120 m.

== Lithology and stratigraphy ==
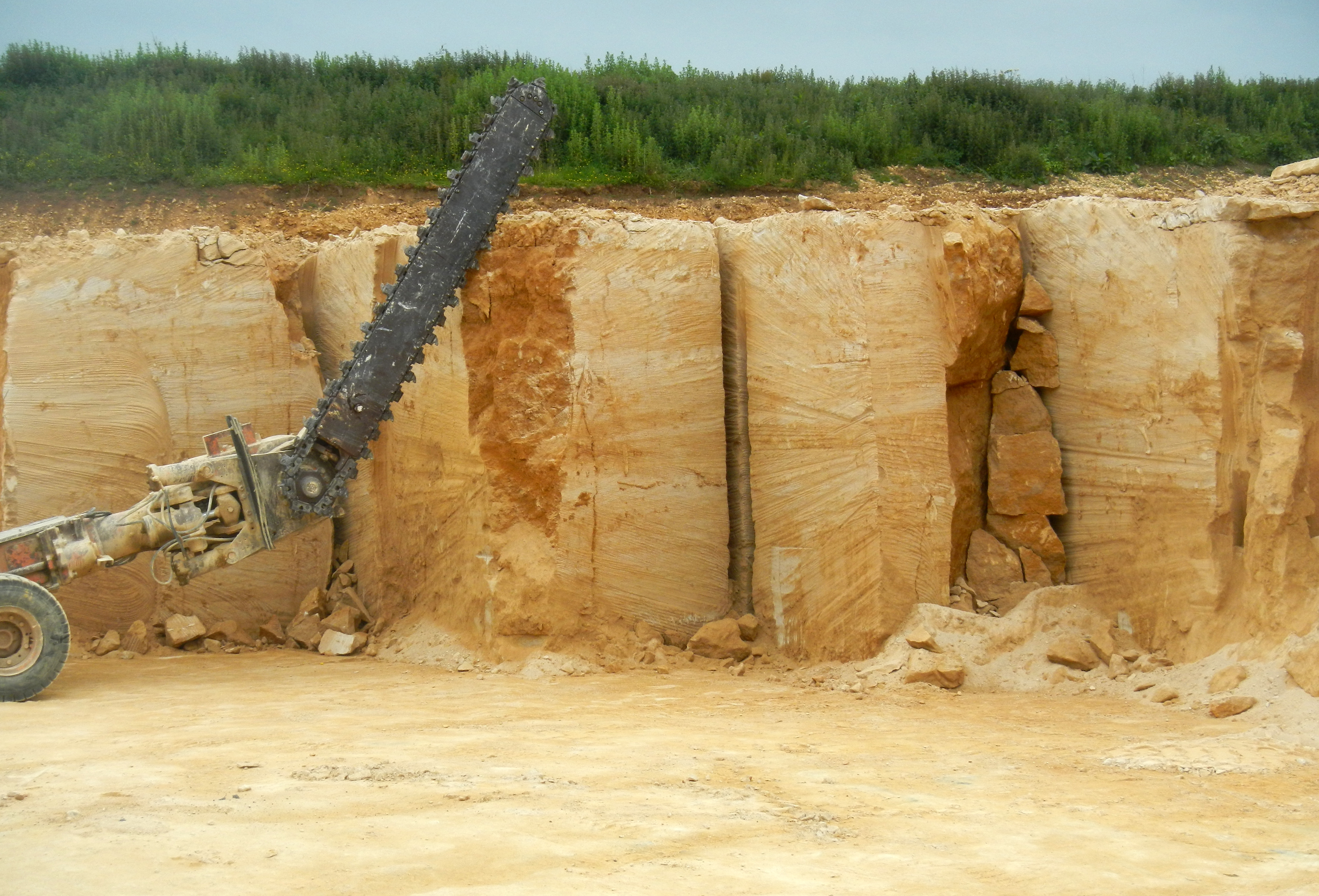
Inferior Oolite (Doulting Stone) at Doulting Stone Quarry, England

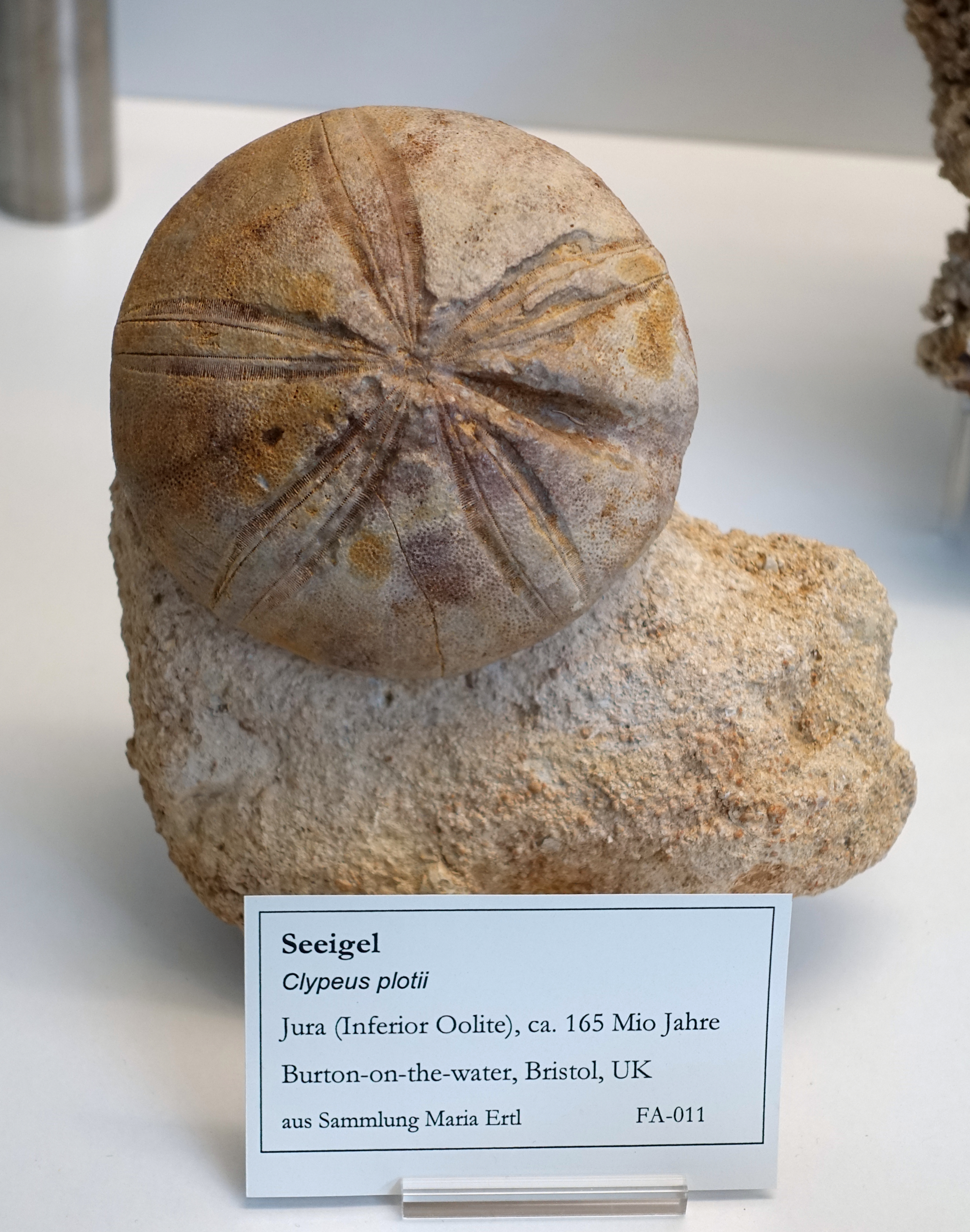
Clypeus ploti, the fossil echinoid that lends its name to the Clypeus Grit of the Inferior Oolite

The group consists of up to 120 m thickness of oolitic limestones and subordinate sandstones and mudstones laid down during the Jurassic Period. In the East Midlands it consists of (in descending order i.e. oldest last) the Lincolnshire Limestone, Grantham and Northampton Sand formations whereas in the Cotswold Hills it consists of the Salperton Limestone, Aston Limestone and Birdlip Limestone formations. The Salperton Limestone contains the Clypeus Grit, a somewhat shelly grainstone that contains the large-diameter echinoid Clypeus ploti as well as Stiphothyris terebratulid brachiopods, and large mussel-like bivalves. The limestones are rich in organic material. The ammonite Parkinsonia parkinsoni, an index fossil for the Bathonian, is native to the Inferior Oolite of Burton Bradstock.

Within Dorset, the Oolite is not subdivided into separately named formations, but is simply considered the Inferior Oolite Formation, sometimes subdivided into the Lower and Upper Inferior Oolite Formations. Within the vicinity of Yeovil it is divided into members which are in ascending order the Corton Denham Member, which predominantly consists of blue siltstone is about 2.5 m thick with the transitional top consisting of green Marl, the Oborne Ironshot Member, the term "ironshot" refers to ferruginised Oolite. The upper portion of which contains intensely bioturbated limestone. Moving Into the Upper Inferior Oolite the Sherborne Limestone Member, which consists of exposed yellow brown fresh grey bioclastic limestone, while the overlying Combe Limestone Member, consists of rubbly limestone and marl, a full stratigraphy of the locality is given below.

Stratigraphy of the Inferior Oolite at Frogden Quarry, Dorset
Formation	Member	Bed	Lithology	Thickness	Ammonite Zone
Upper Inferior Oolite Formation	Combe Limestone Member		Broken limestone and marl	Over 5.6 metres	Garantiana Zone-Parkinsoni Zone
Upper Inferior Oolite Formation	Sherborne Limestone Member	Redhole Lane Beds	Blocky Limestone	2 metres	Garantiana Zone, Dichotoma Subzone
Upper Inferior Oolite Formation	Sherborne Limestone Member	Sherborne Building Stone Beds	Mottled, blocky limestone	~1.5 metres	
Upper Inferior Oolite Formation	Sherborne Limestone Member	Acanthothyris Beds	"Brown sandy biomicrites interbedded with brown marls"	Up to 1.5 metres	
Lower Inferior Oolite Formation	Oborne Ironshot Member	Oborne Road Stone Bed	Bioturbated and intensely burrowed limestone	~0.8 metres	Niortense Zone
Lower Inferior Oolite Formation	Oborne Ironshot Member	Frogden Ironshot Bed	Ferruginous oolite	~1.2 metres	Sauzei to Humphriesianum Zones
Lower Inferior Oolite Formation	Corton Denham Member	Green Grained White Marl	Marl	0.01-0.15 metres	Laeviuscula Zone
Lower Inferior Oolite Formation	Corton Denham Member	Blue Bed	Very hard blue intensely burrowed siltstone	0.85-1 metre	Laeviuscula Zone, Trigonalis Subzone
Lower Inferior Oolite Formation	Corton Denham Member	Corton Denham Beds	Lenticular hard blue-grey siltstone, in channels. separated by nodular siltstone	Seen to 2 metres	Concavum-Ovale Zones

== Vertebrate fauna ==
Ornithopod tracks geographically located in North Yorkshire, England. Ornithopod and theropod tracks present in North Yorkshire, England. A supposed dermal spine long thought to be from a stegosaur is actually a caudal vertebra referable to Archosauria indet.

Color key: Taxon / Reclassified taxon / Taxon falsely reported as present / Dubious taxon or junior synonym / Ichnotaxon / Ootaxon / Morphotaxon	Notes; Uncertain or tentative taxa are in small text; ~~crossed out~~ taxa are discredited.

Dinosaurs of the Inferior Oolite
Genus	Species	Location	Stratigraphic position	Material	Notes	Images
Cetiosaurus	C. epioolithicus	North Yorkshire, England.				Duriavenator Magnosaurus
Cetiosaurus	Indeterminate	Wiltshire, England.				Duriavenator Magnosaurus
Duriavenator	D. hesperis	Dorset, England.		"Skull elements."		Duriavenator Magnosaurus
Magnosaurus	M. nethercombensis	Dorset, England.		"Dentaries, vertebrae, pubis, femora, [and] tibiae."		Duriavenator Magnosaurus
Megalosaurus	M. hesperis	Dorset, England.		"Skull elements."	Moved to the new genus Duriavenator in 2008.	Duriavenator Magnosaurus
Megalosaurus	Indeterminate	Northamptonshire, England.; Somerset, England.			Indeterminate Megalosaurid material.	Duriavenator Magnosaurus
Thyreophora	Indeterminate	Dorset, England.				Duriavenator Magnosaurus

== See also ==
- List of dinosaur-bearing rock formations
