= Widmerpool Gulf =

Former sedimentary basin in England

The Widmerpool Gulf is a name given to a sedimentary basin that existed as an area of open water during the Early Carboniferous (Tournaisian Age). It is named after Widmerpool, near Nottingham and was an extension eastwards as far as Lincolnshire, of the North Staffordshire Gulf. It was formed during a rifting event, which began in the Late Devonian, that affected the area between the London-Brabant Massif to the south and the Highland Boundary Fault to the north. It has a large normal fault on its southern margin and has the form of a half-graben.

In time, the equatorial swamp forests on its shores were converted into the coalfields of Leicestershire, to the south and Nottinghamshire, to the north.
