= Lincolnshire Limestone Formation =

Geological formation in England

- Stratigraphic range: Bajocian
- Type: Geological formation
- Unit of: Inferior Oolite Group
- Sub-units: Upper Lincolnshire Limestone Member, Lower Lincolnshire Limestone Member
- Underlies: Rutland Formation, Great Oolite Group or Hunstanton Formation, Chalk Group
- Overlies: Grantham Formation, Northampton Sand Formation or Lias Group
- Thickness: 0-30 m

Lithology
- Primary: Limestone
- Other: Sandy limestone, mudstone

Location
- Region: Market Weighton to Kettering, Peterborough
- Country: England

Type section
- Named for: Lincolnshire

The Lincolnshire Limestone Formation is a geological formation in England, part of the Inferior Oolite Group of the (Bajocian) Middle Jurassic strata of eastern England. It was formed around 170 million years ago, in a shallow, warm sea on the margin of the London Platform and has estuarine beds above and below it. There are two sub-divisions, the Upper and Lower Lincolnshire Limestone.

It is typically about 30 m thick, reaching a maximum of over 40 m in south Lincolnshire. The lower division varies in thickness between 15 m and 21 m and the upper is typically between 10 m and 16 m thick.

The dividing marker is the 'Crossi' bed which is distinguished by the fossils of the brachiopod Acanthothris crossi it contains. The Crossi bed forms the top of the Lower Lincolnshire limestone. The bottom of the Lower Lincolnshire limestone has some of the characteristics of the underlying Lower Estuarine Series, in that it tends to contain more than usual amounts of sand. A stone from this part of the formation which was commercially exploited is the Collyweston stone slate which was used for roofing for several centuries. It is now largely replaced in new work by concrete imitations.

Much of the rest of the Lower Lincolnshire limestone is oolitic. It formed in warm, shallow seas where evaporation concentrated the dissolved calcium carbonate and then the precipitated material formed concentric layers building up around a nucleus of, usually, a shell fragment as the sea surface was disturbed by winds rolling the sea-bed material around: the resulting little rounded balls are called ooliths or ooids.

== See also ==
- Oolite
- List of types of limestone
- Ancaster stone
- Castle Bytham Quarry
- Collyweston stone slate
