= Syston, Lincolnshire =

Village and civil parish in the South Kesteven district of Lincolnshire, England

Coordinates: 52.957480°N 0.618479°W

Syston
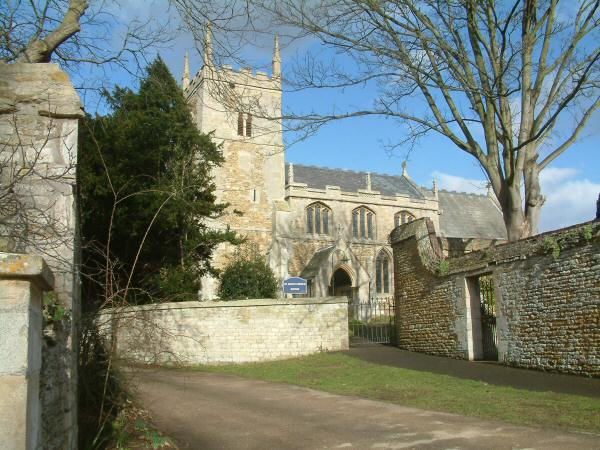
- St Mary's Church, Syston

- Location within Lincolnshire
- Population: 162 (2011)
- OS grid reference: SK929409
  - London: 105 mi (169 km) S
- District: South Kesteven
- Shire county: Lincolnshire
- Region: East Midlands
- Country: England
- Sovereign state: United Kingdom
- Post town: GRANTHAM
- Postcode district: NG32
- Police: Lincolnshire
- Fire: Lincolnshire
- Ambulance: East Midlands
- UK Parliament: Grantham and Bourne

Syston is a village and civil parish in the South Kesteven district of Lincolnshire, England. The population of the civil parish was 162 at the 2011 census. It is situated 3 miles (5 km) north from Grantham, and on the A607 road which runs to the county town of Lincoln. Syston lies between the larger village of Barkston to its north, and Belton to its south.

== Syston Park ==
Syston Park Hall, built in 1775 to the designs of John Lanwith, for Sir John Thorold. Most of the hall was demolished in 1928, but Lord Barnby of Blyth Hall bought that portion which was worth preserving on architectural grounds. It was the seat of the Thorold baronets, who had relocated from Cranwell Manor. The 9th and 10th baronets both served as High Sheriff of Lincolnshire, in 1778 and 1822 respectively. The 10th baronet commissioned architect Lewis Vulliamy in 1822–4 to build a new library which was then richly stocked with rare books and manuscripts, including a copy of the Gutenberg Bible. On his death in 1831 the property passed to his widow Mary Anne, who married Sir Charles Ogle, Bt in 1834.

The contents of the house were dispersed in sales held in 1884 and 1923.

== Motorsports at Syston Park ==
Sir John Thorold was a motorsports enthusiast and held a hill climb in 1906 at Syston Park, T. W. Mays won the 12 hp class in this year, probably accompanied by his son Raymond Mays who went on to become a well known racing driver and owner of ERA and BRM.

In 1926 a circuit was created from the estate road and motorcycle races were held there until the 1930s. At first, these were unaffiliated but soon Syston Park became a Grand Prix venue attracting crowds of up to 30,000 and legends such as Stanley Woods, C. J. Williams and Tommy Cann.

Raymond Mays returned in 1934 to test his new voiturette class racing car ERA R1A and the following year, 1935 Oxford and Cambridge held the Inter-'Varsities at Syston.

Racing ceased in 1939, however, vintage cars and motorcycles returned to Syston Park in 2015 with a regular event established from 2016, Syston Park Speed Trials.
