= Marston, Lincolnshire =

Village and civil parish in the South Kesteven district of Lincolnshire, England

Coordinates: 52.981079°N 0.674421°W

Marston
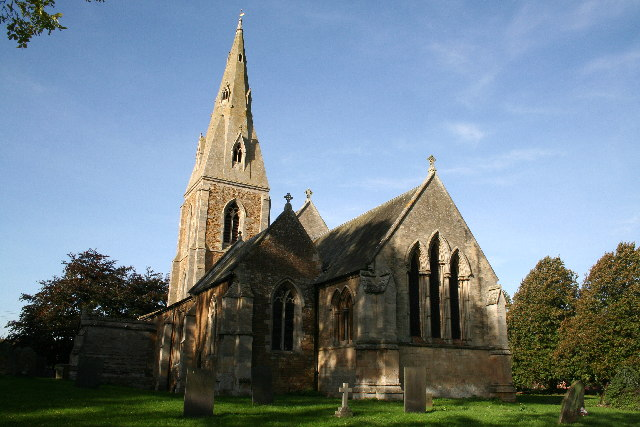
- St Mary's Church, Marston

- Location within Lincolnshire
- Population: 360 (2011)
- OS grid reference: SK890434
  - London: 105 mi (169 km) S
- District: South Kesteven
- Shire county: Lincolnshire
- Region: East Midlands
- Country: England
- Sovereign state: United Kingdom
- Post town: Grantham
- Postcode district: NG32
- Police: Lincolnshire
- Fire: Lincolnshire
- Ambulance: East Midlands
- UK Parliament: Grantham and Bourne

Marston is a village and civil parish in the South Kesteven district of Lincolnshire, England. The population of the civil parish at the 2011 census was 360. It lies 5 miles (8 km) north from Grantham, 8 miles (13 km) south-east from Newark, and 1.5 miles (2.4 km) north from the A1 near Long Bennington

Marston Grade I listed Anglican parish church is dedicated to St Mary, and is of 12th-century origin, with an 1881-82 chancel by C. Kirk. Pevsner gives the date of the chancel as 1878, restored and partly rebuilt in Early English style. St Mary's holds monuments to members of the Thorold family.

Marston Hall is a Grade II* late 16th-century country house, with further alterations up to the 18th century. Pevsner records a 1962 "gothick" style garden gazebo, designed by John Partridge, with pinnacles by Christopher Blackie and murals by Barbara Jones.

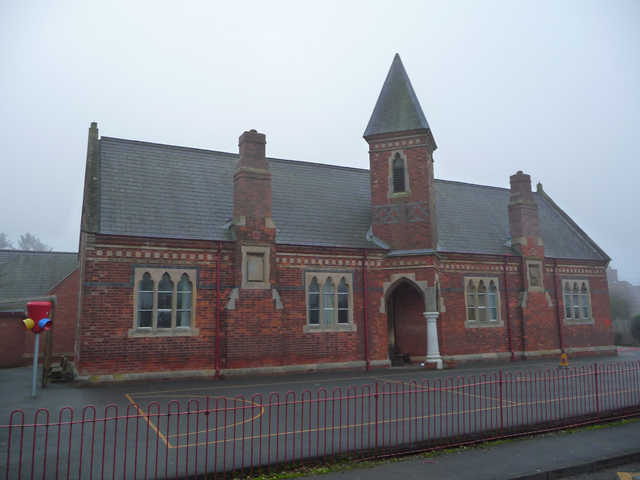
Marston school

Marston Thorold Primary School dates from 1861. It is still somewhat supported by the Dame Margaret Thorold Educational Foundation, is now Church of England voluntary aided.

The village also has a church hall, the Thorold Arms public house and a fishery. The Ramada Resort hotel, formerly the Old Barn, is located on Toll Bar Road.
