= Thorold baronets =

Set index for Thorold baronets

There have been four baronetcies created for members of the Thorold family of Lincolnshire, two in the Baronetage of England and two in the Baronetage of Great Britain. As of 2026 one creation is extant.

- Thorold baronets of Marston (1642)
- Thorold baronets of Hough-on-the-Hill (1644)
- Thorold baronets of Harmston, 1709 and 1740 creations
