= Navenby =

Village and civil parish in Lincolnshire, England

Coordinates: 53°06′27″N 0°31′30″W

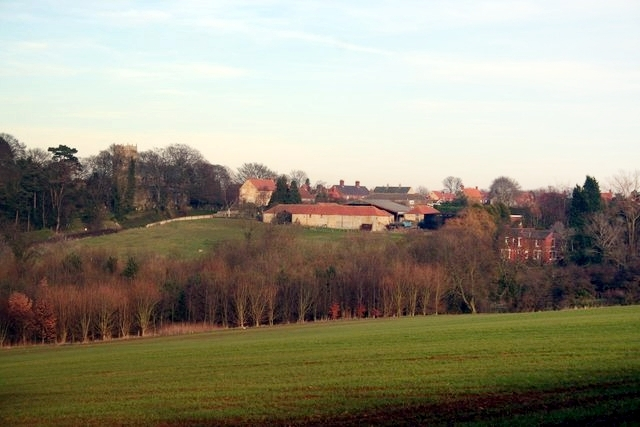
- Navenby village from the Viking Way

- Location within Lincolnshire
- Population: 2,361 (2021 census)
- OS grid reference: SK987580
  - London: 110 mi (180 km) S
- District: North Kesteven
- Shire county: Lincolnshire
- Region: East Midlands
- Country: England
- Sovereign state: United Kingdom
- Post town: LINCOLN
- Postcode district: LN5
- Dialling code: 01522
- Police: Lincolnshire
- Fire: Lincolnshire
- Ambulance: East Midlands
- UK Parliament: Sleaford and North Hykeham

Navenby /ˈneɪvənbi/ is a village and civil parish in the North Kesteven district of Lincolnshire, England. Lying 8 miles (13 km) south from Lincoln and 9 miles (14 km) north-northwest from Sleaford, Navenby had a population of 2,361 in the 2021 census. In March 2011, it was named as the 'Best Value Village' in England following a national survey.

A Bronze Age cemetery and the remains of an Iron Age settlement have been uncovered in the village by Navenby Archaeologist Group and Allen Archaeology. Historians also believe Navenby was a significant staging point on the Roman Ermine Street, as the Romans are reported to have maintained a small base or garrison in the village due to close proximity to the village of Ancaster. Navenby became a market town after receiving a charter from Edward the Confessor in the 11th century. The charter was later renewed by William Rufus, Edward III and Richard II. When the market fell into disuse in the early 19th century, Navenby returned to being a village.

The civil parish of Navenby is rural, covering more than 2,100 acres (850 ha). It straddles Ermine Street, a Roman road built between 45 and 75 AD, which runs between London and York. The Viking Way, a 147-mile (237 km) footpath between the Humber Bridge in North Lincolnshire and Oakham in Rutland, also cuts through the village. The Vikings exerted great influence over Lincolnshire in the 9th and 10th centuries, as can be seen in the many local place names ending in -by, such as Navenby. Names ending with -by meant homestead or village.

== History ==
=== Early history ===
Archaeological investigations around Navenby indicate the area has been occupied since at least the British Bronze Age, about 600 BC. The remains of British Iron Age farms have been found at Chapel Lane, a site now protected as a public open space by the district and parish councils and supported by Navenby Archaeology Group.

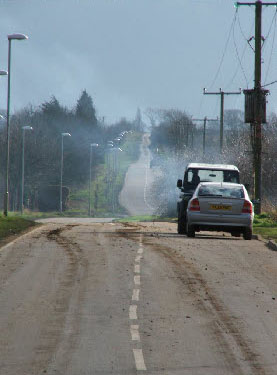
Ermine Street in Navenby today

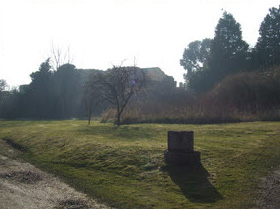
The remains of Navenby's market cross

Significant Roman finds include parts of shops and houses that would have fronted onto Ermine Street, down which Roman armies marched to and from the Legionary Fortress at Lincoln. The city of Lincoln was very important at that time, probably the capital of the late Roman Province of Flavia Caesariensis. Evidence suggests that Navenby was a significant staging point along Ermine Street. The Romans are reported to have maintained a small base or garrison in the village, and a possible Romano-British temple and burial sites have been unearthed in the area. A 2009 archaeological dig uncovering a road, building foundations and Roman graves along with pottery and coins, showed Navenby to be a Roman Service Station.

Cremations dated to the middle Saxon period have been discovered near the junction of High Dyke with Chapel Lane. Late Saxon remains have also been found under and around St Peter's Church, suggesting the original Roman village had moved from Ermine Street to Church Lane and North Lane by the late-Saxon period.

Navenby's Saxon name is unknown. The present name is derived from the Old Norse Nafni+by, which means "farmstead or village of a man called Nafni". In the Domesday Book of 1086, Navenby appears as Navenbi and Navenebi. The Vikings exerted considerable influence over Lincolnshire in the 9th and 10th centuries, as can be seen in the many local place names ending in -by. The Viking Way, a 147-mile (237 km) footpath that cuts through the village, is a lasting reminder of their presence.

=== Middle Ages ===
Navenby, originally an agricultural village, became a market town after receiving a charter from Edward the Confessor in the 11th century. The charter was later renewed by William Rufus, Edward III, and Richard II.

The wide main street, down which farmers once drove their sheep to market, is lasting evidence of its market town status. A market square once stood at the centre, marked by a cross in honour of Queen Eleanor. Today, the square has gone and the cross is a ruin.

Parish records exist for Navenby from 1681, although bishops' transcripts go back to 1562. The documents show the village hosted several annual fairs each year: a market fair on 17 October at which farm animals were traded; a feast on the Thursday before Easter; and a Hiring Fair held each May Day, at which servants gathered to seek employment.

The records also show that part of the parish of Navenby was enclosed in 1772. Such was the significance of Navenby at this time that a workhouse for the parish poor was erected here, although the building was later given over to other uses. A Sick Society was founded in 1811 and a Parish School was built next to St Peter's Church in 1816, paid for by subscription. Following the Poor Law Amendment Act 1834 Navenby parish became part of the Lincoln Poor Law Union.

=== 19th century ===
Church Street – now renamed Church Lane – in 1907

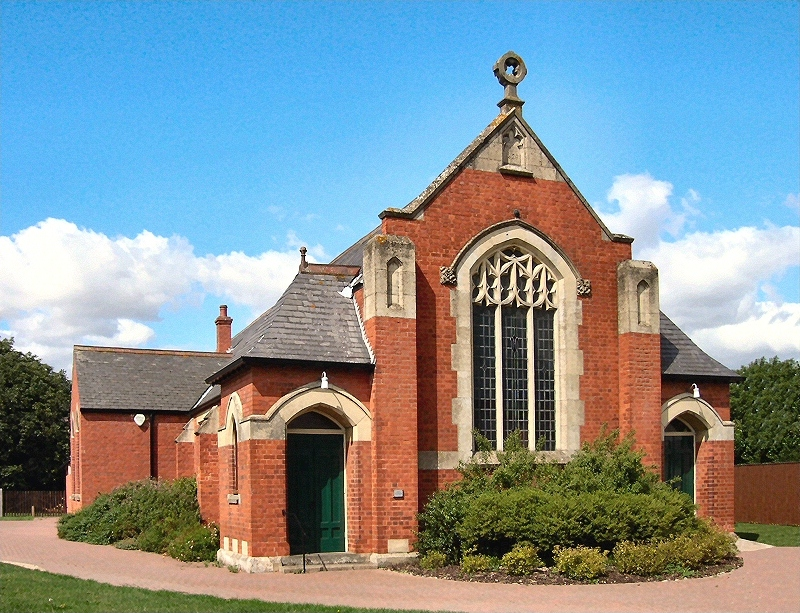
Navenby Methodist Church

When the market closed in the early 19th century Navenby lost its status as a market town, and once again became an agricultural village. The Penny Cyclopaedia of 1839, published by The Society for the Diffusion of Useful Knowledge, described the village in this way:

Navenby is in the hundred of Boothby Graffoe, parts of Kesteven, on the road from Grantham to Lincoln, 124 miles [200 km] from London.

The church is partly of Early English and partly of Decorated English architecture. The windows of the chancel are very fine specimens of Decorated character, particularly the east window, the mullions and tracery of which are remarkably graceful.

There were in 1833 two dame schools, with 18 children; two day-schools, with 25 children; and one endowed day and Sunday school, with 109 children in the week and 166 on Sunday.

Many buildings were erected in Navenby during the 19th century, including a small Wesleyan Methodist chapel in about 1830, which was completely rebuilt in 1840. A Temperance Hall was built in 1852, later used as a second base by the Wesleyan Reformers.

A Volunteer Fire Brigade was founded in 1844, comprising five men and a manual engine. The Provincial Gas Light and Coke Company began supplying gas lighting to the village in 1857, and in 1867 a railway station was built three-quarters of a mile (1.2 km) west of the village, on the Lincoln-to-Grantham branch of the Great Northern Railway.

By 1871, the Dean and Chapter of Lincoln was the principal landowner and Lord of the manor of Navenby. A witch bottle was discovered in the foundations of a Navenby farmhouse in 2005, thought to date back to about 1830. Containing pins, human hair and urine, the bottle was believed to protect a household against evil spells.

=== Modern history ===
Navenby was an agricultural village at the beginning of the 20th century, but the outbreak of the First World War brought changes for the community. A small airfield, Wellingore Heath, was opened on land bordering Navenby in 1917, to provide a base for the Royal Flying Corps and the Royal Naval Air Service. The flat landscape, with its cliff-top situation, proved an ideal situation for flight operations.

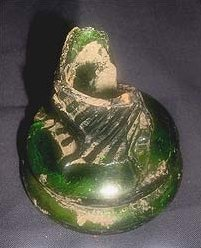
The Navenby Witch Bottle

T. E. Lawrence, perhaps better known as Lawrence of Arabia, was stationed at nearby RAF Cranwell just after the war, in 1926, where he wrote a revised version of his Seven Pillars Of Wisdom. He mentioned Navenby in a letter to a friend at the time, saying:

I'm too shy to go looking for dirt. That's why I can't go off stewing into the Lincoln or Navenby brothels with the fellows. They think it's because I'm superior: proud, or peculiar or 'posh', as they say: and it's because I wouldn't know what to do, how to carry myself, where to stop. Fear again: fear everywhere.

Wellingore airfield closed after the war ended, but it was re-opened in 1935 and its facilities expanded during the winter of 1939–40. By then known as RAF Wellingore, notable officers stationed there included Wing Commander Guy Gibson. Group Captain Douglas Bader is known to have briefly messed at Wellingore while on R&R leave from the Battle of Britain too, and both Gibson and Bader were regular visitors to Navenby. The base served as a satellite field for RAF Digby until 1944 and as a relief landing ground for RAF Cranwell from April 1944 until its final closure in 1945, after which it was used as a camp for prisoners of war from Germany and Ukraine; the inmates were often made to work on the surrounding farmland.

Navenby lost many men during the two World Wars. The village war memorial, a rough hewn stone Celtic Cross mounted on a plinth with a three-stepped base, is in the churchyard of St Peter's. It was manufactured by Messrs G Maile & Son Ltd at a cost of £200, and unveiled in April 1921. On it are inscribed the names of the 22 casualties from the First World War and the 8 from the Second World War.

Following an initial decline in the population of Navenby at the turn of the 20th century, the post-war years saw numbers rise steeply. This increase can be directly linked to the 35-plus new houses built from the end of the First World War until the 1950s, as well as to other building projects from the 1970s onwards. Other post-war changes include the move away from a dependence on farming. Although Navenby continues to be surrounded by farms, it is now largely a dormitory village for Lincoln, Grantham and beyond. Figures from the 2001 census show that, out of a population of 1,666, almost 600 commute to work each day.

== Governance ==
The parish of Navenby was originally in the higher division of the ancient Boothby Graffoe wapentake, in the North Kesteven division of the county of Lincolnshire. The term wapentake dates back to the Vikings and was used to describe a collection of local parishes. It originally meant "show your weapon" and the idea behind the term was that all those in favour of a resolution would raise their sword or axe to show agreement.

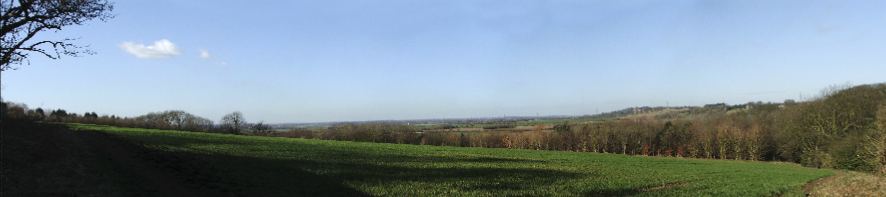
A panoramic view across Navenby lowfields and the old station, towards the Trent valley, from the top of the Lincoln Cliff at Clint Lane, Navenby

The History of the County of Lincoln, a book written by Thomas Allen in 1834, states:

The Wapentake of Boothby Graffoe is bounded on the north by Lawress wapentake; on the east by Lincoln Liberty and Langoe wapentake; on the south by Loveden wapentake; and on the west by Nottinghamshire. It is separated into High and Low Divisions. Through this wapentake a Roman road passes from Lincoln to Brough, a village just without the bounds of the county. The High division of the wapentake of Boothby Graffoe contains the villages of Boothby, Coleby, Harmston, Navenby, Skinnard, Swinethorpe, Welbourn and Wellingore. Navenby used to be a market town. The living is a rectory, rated at £17 10s. 0d., and is in the patronage of the Master and Fellows of Christ Church College, Cambridge.

Navenby was classed as an ancient parish from the 11th to the 19th century, as it came "under the jurisdiction of a clergyman" and existed before 1597. Early records show that the Manor of Navenby was granted to the Dean and Chapter of Lincoln in 1292. The money generated by land rent was used by Roger de Newton, the first incumbent of the chantry chapel at Harby, Nottinghamshire, to maintain the building. This followed the death of Queen Eleanor, wife of Edward I, while on a visit to Lincoln. Eleanor died at de Newton's manor house at Harby in November 1290 and the chapel was erected in her honour.

The parish began to take on civil as well as ecclesiastical duties following the 16th-century Dissolution of the Monasteries and the Tudor Poor Law Acts of 1601. The ecclesiastical parish of Navenby was originally placed in the Longoboby Rural Deanery, but was transferred to the Graffoe Rural Deanery in 1968, and it is still part of the Diocese of Lincoln. Navenby officially became a civil parish in the 19th century and became a member of the Lincoln Poor Law Union in 1834. The parish was also part of the Lincoln Rural Sanitary District. The Navenby civil parish boundaries were adjusted in 1931, to include the civil parish of nearby Skinnand.

Following the Local Government Act 1888, Navenby was governed by Branston Rural District Council from 1894 to 1931. The village then came under the control of North Kesteven Rural District Council from 1931 to 1974, after the Local Government Act 1972 reformed the districts of Holland, Kesteven and much of Lindsey into the shire county of Lincolnshire. Today Navenby remains part of the North Kesteven district.

Before the Reform Act 1832 (2 & 3 Will. 4. c. 45), Lincolnshire sent twelve members to parliament, including two for the county, two for the city of Lincoln and two for the boroughs of Boston, Grantham, Great Grimsby and Stamford. As a result of the act, Lincolnshire's electoral divisions were amended, and Navenby became part of the South Division Parliamentary District for Lincolnshire. Two Whig candidates, Henry Handley and Gilbert John Heathcote, were returned in the first election. The village remained in the South Division until 1867, when it was transferred to the Mid Division. In 1885 it joined the North Kesteven Division, and in 1918 it became part of the Grantham Division, until 1974.

Today, Navenby has its own parish council, dealing with issues such as play-area revamps and the protection of public open spaces. The council is based at High Street, Navenby. As of 2014, the chairman is Steve Woollas. The second tier of local government provided for Navenby is the Conservative-controlled North Kesteven District Council, which is responsible for housing problems and public health. The council is based at Kesteven Street, Sleaford. Navenby is part of the Cliff Villages ward and is represented by two local councillors on the district council: Mrs Marianne Jane Overton and Mrs Laura Louise Conway, who both belong to the Rural Independent Group.

Conservative-led Lincolnshire County Council provides the top tier of local government for Navenby, with responsibility for highways, sites of special interest and schools. It is based at the County Offices in Newland, Lincoln. Navenby has one representative on this council, Marianne Overton, who also represents Branston ward. Following the by-election of December 2016, Navenby is represented at government level by Caroline Johnson, the Conservative MP for Sleaford and North Hykeham constituency, following the resignation of Stephen Phillips. Prior to Phillips, the Right Honorable Douglas Hogg QC, stood down from the post before the 2010 election after having to pay back the cost of cleaning his moat.

Navenby was part of the East Midlands constituency for the European Parliament until Brexit in 2020. Former Conservative turned Liberal Democrat Bill Newton Dunn represented the area as a Member of the European Parliament. Newton Dunn lives in Navenby and his European responsibilities included vice-chairman of Foreign Affairs, Human Rights, Common Security and Defence Policy Committee. In the 1980s, Newton Dunn coined the much-used phrase "Democratic deficit".

== Geography ==
=== Topography ===
Navenby at the turn of the 20th century

The civil parish of Navenby straddles the old Roman Ermine Street, known locally as High Dyke. The road runs between the neighbouring villages of Boothby Graffoe and Wellingore and covers more than 2,100 acres (850 ha). The Viking Way, a 147-mile (237 km) footpath between the Humber Bridge in North Lincolnshire and Oakham in Rutland, also passes through the village.

Navenby is known as a Lincolnshire Cliff Village, as it is situated on a ridge of Jurassic limestone called the Lincoln Edge or Lincoln Cliff. The small cliff is one of the most distinctive hills in Lincolnshire. Lying 8.7 miles (14 km) south of Lincoln and 8.9 miles (14.3 km) north-northwest of Sleaford, Navenby enjoys warm summers and dry frosty winters.

During the Ice Age, most of the region surrounding Navenby was covered by ice sheets and this has influenced the topography and nature of the soils. Much of Lincolnshire is low-lying, in some places below sea level, but Navenby's cliff-top position means it is 226 feet (69 m) above sea level, giving it commanding views over the River Witham valley.

The parish of Navenby is elongated in an east–west direction, extending east to the Lincoln Heath and west to the River Brant. The size of the parish has varied over the past two centuries. In 1821 it covered 2,110 acres (854 ha); in 1951 it was 3,345 acres (1,354 ha).

=== Housing, streets and nearby places ===
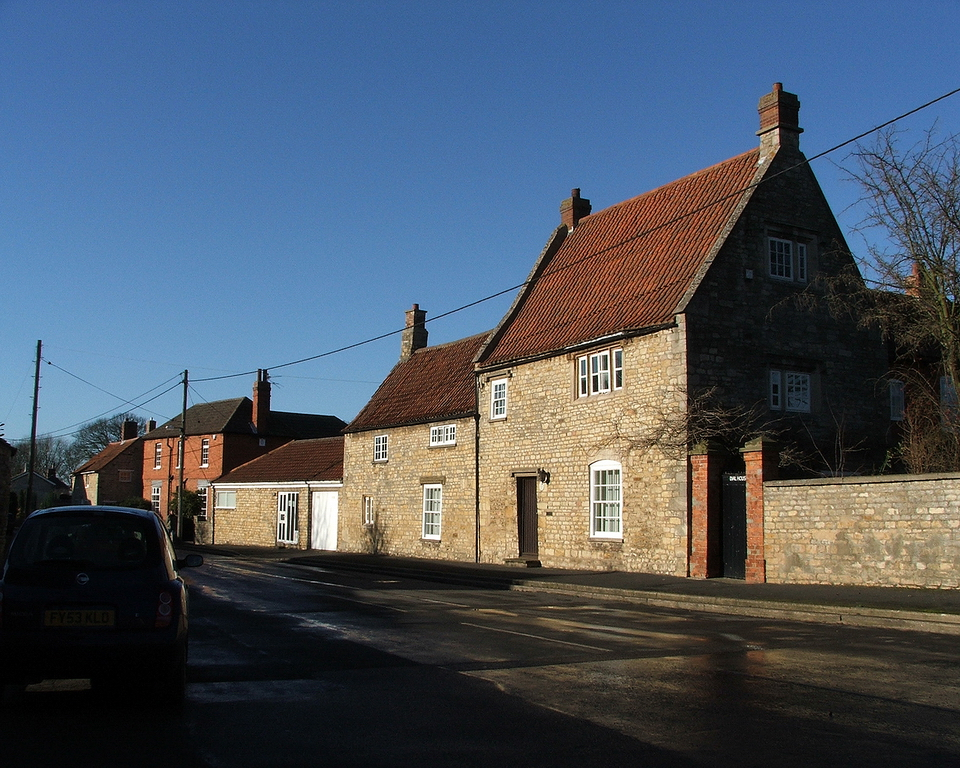
Grade II listed Dial House, Navenby

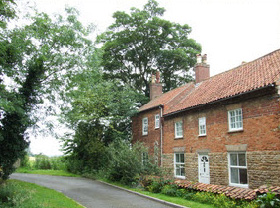
Clint Lane – Grade II listed housing

Although house prices have traditionally been lower than the national average in Navenby, they have risen quickly in recent years. In 2004, the average house price rose by 8.2% to £163,186, according to the Land Registry, while in 1999 the average was £60,000. The district surrounding Navenby – North Kesteven – remains a relatively inexpensive place to purchase property. Consequently, owner occupation is 77% – which is higher than both the regional and national averages. However, the rising prices of recent years are resulting in housing becoming increasingly "out of reach for those on average incomes". A 2004 Housing Needs Study, carried out by Fordham Associates for North Kesteven District Council, highlighted the need for 460 "affordable homes" to be built each year for the next five years in Navenby and the surrounding villages.

More than a dozen houses, pubs and other buildings have been granted listed status in Navenby. Houses of specific interest include Grade II listed Dial House in North Lane, which has a priest hole, and the Old Rectory in North Lane, which was built of Ashlar stone in 1859 by H A Darbyshire, a London architect.

Several of Navenby's street names hint at its past. For example, the street now known as Clint Lane used to be Watery Lane, apparently due to the number of springs that ran along it. The only "watery" part of Clint Lane today is a duck pond. The street includes a mix of 18th-century cottages, Victorian properties, Grade II listed farm buildings and 20th-century homes.

Gas Lane, which is next to Clint Lane, used to be called Meg's Lane. It was renamed Gas Lane after the Provincial Gas Light and Coke Company set up a base there in 1857. The firm later became the Navenby and Wellingore Gas Light and Coke Company. Although the business has long since disappeared, the street name survives.

The street now known as Church Lane used to be Church Street. The road was named for the village church, St Peter's, which is located here, as is a former village school, now a private house. The school was built by subscription in 1816 and carries the inscription "The Benefit Society 1821".

=== Climate ===
According to the Köppen classification, the British Isles experience a maritime climate characterised by relatively cool summers and mild winters. Compared with other parts of the country, Lincolnshire – and Navenby – are slightly warmer and sunnier in the summer and colder and frostier in the winter. Owing to Navenby's inland position, far from the landfall of most Atlantic depressions, it is one of the driest places to live in the UK, receiving, on average, less than 2 ft (610 mm) of rain per year. The mean annual daily duration of bright sunshine is four hours and 12 minutes; the absence of any high ground is probably responsible for the area being one of the sunniest parts of the British Isles.

Climate data for Navenby
Month	Jan	Feb	Mar	Apr	May	Jun	Jul	Aug	Sep	Oct	Nov	Dec	Year
Mean daily maximum °F	43	44	49	54	60	65	70	70	64	57	48	44	56
Mean daily minimum °F	35	35	38	40	45	50	54	54	51	46	40	37	42
Average precipitation inches	1.45	1.08	1.04	1.46	1.13	1.51	1.7	1.45	1.61	1.83	1.51	1.38	21
Mean daily maximum °C	6	7	9	12	16	18	21	21	18	14	9	7	13
Mean daily minimum °C	2	2	3	4	7	10	12	12	11	8	4	3	6
Average precipitation mm	37	27	26	37	29	38	43	37	41	46	38	35	530
Source: MSN

== Demography ==
Data from the 2001 UK census
	Navenby	North Kesteven	England
Total population	1,666	94,024	49,138,831
Long-term illness	19.2%	17.8%	18.2%
Unemployed	2.4%	2.4%	3.4%
Aged 75+	11.4%	8.3%	7.6%
Average age	43.6	40.8	38.6
Ethnic white	98.9%	98.9%	90.9%
Christian	85.2%	82.4%	71.8%
Married or remarried	64.0%	61.4%	50.9%
Good health	68.7%	69.6%	68.6%
Living alone	24.5%	24.8%	30.0%
Owner occupied	83.7%	77.1%	68.9%
Degree+ education	21%	16.2%	19.8%
Providing unpaid care	10.3%	10.2%	10.0%
Two+ cars	38.6%	36.3%	29.4%

The United Kingdom Census 2001 found Navenby had 861 households and a population of 1,666, of which 792 were male and 874 female. This figure shows a population growth of more than 70% in the past 30 years, mainly due to on-going housebuilding projects.

The 2001 census revealed there were only three second homes in the village, but that many villagers commuted each day to work. The great majority of properties are owner-occupied, with just over 100 rented from the council or private landlords. Most of the houses (over 500) are classified as detached, the average number of rooms per property is 6.0 and the average household size is 2.3.

Ethnic diversity is minimal in Navenby. Statistics for 2001 show that of 707 households questioned, 703 were classed as white. Of those 707 households, 104 were pensioners living alone, 176 were couples without children, 27 were lone parents and 153 couples with dependent children. 343 of the households had at least one vehicle. Sickness rates were surprising high – with 237 households reporting one or more people with limiting long-term illness. A total of 82% call themselves Christians.

People aged between 25 and 44 represent the majority of Navenby residents, with 451 recorded in 2001. This is closely followed by people aged 45–64 (442) and children aged 5–15 (221). Children aged under 4 (69) and people aged 16–24 (115) are in the minority. Almost 200 people (190) over the age of 75 were living in Navenby in 2001. The mean age of Navenby's population is 43.5 and the median age is 43.5. In 1851, 136 babies in every 1,000 died in their first year. This figure dropped to 107 per 1,000 in 1911 and three per 1,000 by 2001.

The people of Navenby enjoy a high employment rate, although most work outside the village. Almost 600 commute each day, with the average journey to work being 12.5 miles (20.1 km). The 2001 census revealed that of 1,186 people questioned aged 16–74, 722 were economically active, with men working an average of 44.8 hours each week and women an average of 31.2. The service industry was the largest sector of the local economy, employing 67% of all workers, compared to 1841 when 48% worked in agriculture. Manufacturing work was carried out by 178 people in 2001 and 565 were in the service industries. Of these workers, 371 were classed as managerial and professional. In 1841, just 16.6% of male workers had middle class jobs, but the 2001 census showed this figure had increased to 47.9%.

Those with few or no qualifications numbered 597 in 2001, while 328 had higher diplomas, degrees or further degrees. In contrast, about 53% of children aged 5–14 went to school in 1851, but today 58% of those aged 16–17 stay on at school.

At the point of the 2011 census, Navenby contained approximately 914 households with a population of about 2,128.

Historical population of Navenby
Year	Population
1801	479
1811	542
1821	625
1831	778
1851	1,057
1871	1,000
1901	779
1911	796
1921	824
1951	851
1971	938
2001	1,666
2011	2,128
2021	2,361

== Economy and media ==
Navenby was originally an agricultural village, with most people living off the land or trading goods in the local market. Statistics show that, in 1841, 48% of villagers worked in agriculture, but today the majority of villagers, 67%, are employed in the service industry and most commute to work away from Navenby. The village does, however, offer limited work opportunities, with the High Street lined with shops, fast-food stores and public houses. A doctors' surgery, building society and residential care home are based in the village, although the post office closed in January 2011.

The local newspaper for Navenby is the Lincolnshire Echo, which includes news and sports reports, as well as job advertisements. The local radio stations for the village are BBC Radio Lincolnshire on 94.9 FM and Greatest Hits Radio on 102.2 FM. The newest addition to the local airwaves is Siren FM, a community radio station that broadcasts on 107.3 FM from the University of Lincoln.

== Landmarks ==
The centre of Navenby village is a designated conservation area; many of the stone and brick-built houses date back hundreds of years. More than 20 of the properties, as well as the 1935 red telephone kiosk in High Street, have listed building status.

=== Mrs Smith's Cottage ===
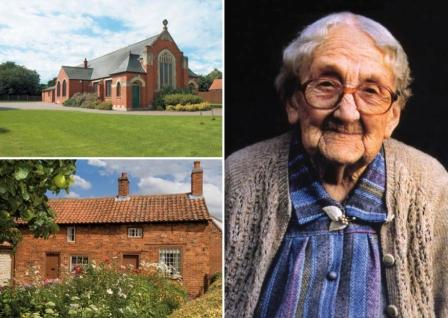
Mrs Smith. To her left is her cottage and Navenby Methodist Church, where she was a member.

Mrs Smith's Cottage is a mid-19th century Grade II listed building made from early Victorian red bricks. The range, the heart of the house, was in daily use for cooking and heating until the mid-1990s. The only access to the bedrooms is by a ladder. Electricity was installed in the 1930s, and the only other visible modern innovations are the coldwater tap – installed to prevent the local council condemning the cottage in the late 1970s – and an inside toilet. The original outside privy and washhouse can still be viewed.

The cottage is named after its last resident, Mrs Hilda Smith, who lived there until 1995, when she was 102 years old. When she died, villagers mounted a campaign to ensure the cottage was kept as "something special" for Navenby.

Today the cottage is run as a museum, granted permission for use as such in March 2000. It is open for much of the year and staffed by volunteers. The old pig sty and storage shed, deemed beyond repair, were demolished and the bricks used to build a purpose-built visitor centre, used for exhibitions about Navenby and the locality.

=== St Peter's Church ===
The Grade I listed Church of England parish church in Navenby is dedicated to Saint Peter. Its parish registers survive from 1681 and Bishop's transcripts from 1562. It is difficult to date the building as it has a mishmash of styles, although its origins are probably 13th century.

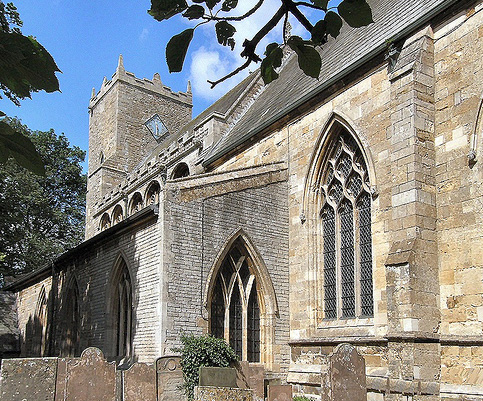
St Peter's Church today

St Peter's is made up of three parts, including a mid-19th-century west tower, which replaced the original in 1859–60 after it fell down. The perpendicular clerestory is decorated with shields in quatrefoils and is lit with closely set three-light windows. The tall, decorated chancel has very large windows. The side windows have reticulated tracery. The large east window was partly rebuilt 1875–76, and is of six lights with two large mouchettes nodding to each other, as well as a very large reticulation unit.

The sedilia and piscina are thought to date back to William de Herleston, who was rector from 1325–29. He was Edward I's chancellor and later became Canon of Llandaff. A founder's tomb, which is in a slightly different style, is probably that of his successor, John de Fenton, rector until 1332. The font is a lavish Victorian affair by Charles Kirk the Younger, which was shown at the 1862 International Exhibition in London. The Pulpit is Jacobean and the Rood screen by Temple Moore dates from 1910. The Royal Arms are signed "Thomas Hunton of Lincoln. Painter 1710." There is a late 13th-century grave slab, with an inscription in Norman script which says "Pray for Richard de Lue" (Louth).

The church also contains an Easter Sepulchre. The carving is recognised as one of the finest in Lincolnshire, if not in the country, and receives a mention in virtually every book written on churches and their architecture. The churchyard is managed as a nature reserve.

In 1982, the parochial church council proposed closing the church as it was denied permission to sell its antique silver to assist with urgent repairs. The Archdeacon, Michael Adie, ruled that such sales were against church policy and that funds must be raised locally.

== Transport ==
Navenby village lies at the eastern end of Navenby parish and is best accessed by road, as the A607 trunk road passes through the heart of the village. Navenby can also be reached from the A15 road, which runs past the end of Green Man Lane and links Lincoln with Sleaford. Editors of the website RoadGhosts.com claim this is one of the most haunted roads in Britain.

Navenby station in around 1920

Navenby once had its own railway station, built in 1867 as part of the Lincoln to Grantham branch of the Great Northern Railway. It fell victim, however, to the government's post-war railway closure programme, which was designed to modernise the service and return it to profitability. Some 3,318 miles (5,340 km) of railway were closed between 1948 and 1962 under this scheme, including Navenby station, which was shut in 1962. Today, the closest main line stations are Newark North Gate and Grantham, both on the high-speed London to Scotland East Coast Main Line; nearby branch line stations include Lincoln and Sleaford.

Bus services to and from Navenby are limited. The main service is provided by Stagecoach in Lincolnshire, which runs the Number 1 service from Lincoln to Grantham, via Navenby, along the A607 every 30 minutes, from 7 am until 7 pm, every day except Sunday. There is only one bus on a Sunday. The same Number 1 service runs in the opposite direction too, from Grantham to Lincoln via Navenby, every 30 minutes each day except Sunday. Hodson's Coaches of Navenby runs an extra bus each Sunday to Lincoln.

== Education ==
Navenby is served by its own village school, Navenby Church of England Primary School. It is a voluntary controlled school for children aged 4–11. There is a choice of nearby senior schools for older Navenby pupils, although none are within the village. Lincolnshire County Council operates a preference system for parents, which allows them to choose a preferred school, rather than one for which they are in the catchment area. The closest senior school to Navenby, and the one that is within the Designated Transport Area, is Sir William Robertson High School at Welbourn. This is a mixed comprehensive school named after Field Marshal William Robertson, who was born in Welbourn and served in the First World War.

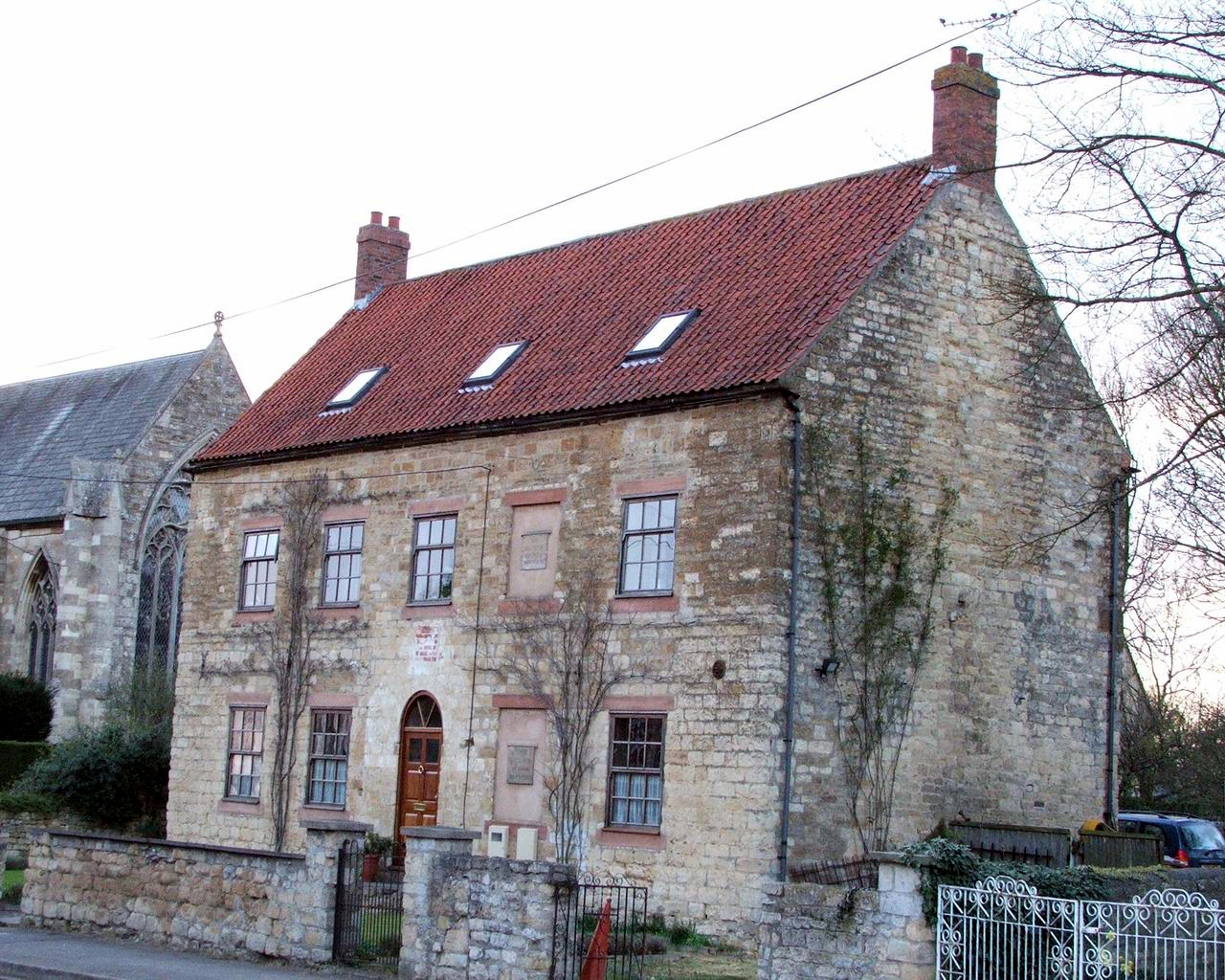
The old school in Church Lane

Other senior schools within a 10-mile (16 km) radius include Branston Community Academy, and two grammar schools in nearby Sleaford – Carre's Grammar School for boys and Kesteven and Sleaford High School for girls. Private schools are available in Lincoln. Many local senior schools offer sixth form tuition, and further education courses for students aged 16 and over are also provided by Lincoln College, which is the largest educational institution in Lincolnshire. It has 18,500 students, of whom 2,300 are full-time.

Nearby Lincoln has two higher education institutions, the older Bishop Grosseteste University and the more recent, larger University of Lincoln.

== Culture and community ==
Navenby used to be served by several public houses, but The Butcher's Arms and The Green Man Inn have long been converted into private houses. Now, just the King's Head and The Lion and Royal remain.

High Street houses in the 1920s

The Grade II listed 18th-century King's Head is probably the oldest public house in the village; the nearby Lion and Royal dates from 1824 and is also Grade II listed. It was probably just called "The Lion" when it first opened, but added "Royal" to its name in honour of a special visitor. There is a large emblem over the front door, topped by the Prince of Wales's feathers, presented after the Prince (later Edward VII) stayed there, albeit briefly, in 1870.

The former Green Man Inn, at the junction of Green Man Lane and the A15, was once a staging post for travellers and may have also been a court house. The Lincoln Club was established here in about 1741, catering for the "distinguished gentlemen of Lincolnshire". Sir Francis Dashwood, founder of the notorious Hellfire Club, was a member, as were Lord Monson of Burton and Lord Robert Manners of Bloxholm.

Lincolnshire has a number of local dishes, including stuffed chine and haslet, and Navenby is home to several local food champions. Navenby baker Pete Welbourne was named as Great Britain's Baker of the Year in 2004, for his Lincolnshire Plum Bread recipe, and Odling Bros butchers' shop has enjoyed repeated success in an annual competition to find the best Lincolnshire pork sausages in the county.

Local legend has it that Navenby is part of the Temple Bruer Pentagram. The pentagram includes the nearby villages of Temple Bruer – which has strong connections with the Knights Templar of the 12th century – as well as Wellingore and Harmston. It appears the sign is centred on the sewage works just west of Navenby. The pentagram is seen as having magical associations and is often said to have offered protection to witches. It also, however, has links with Christianity, Freemasonry and the Knights Templar, who used the pentagram symbol to represent "infinity, connectiveness and oneness".

Although the A607 trunk road passes through Navenby, the village can also be accessed from the "haunted" A15, which runs past the end of Green Man Lane. According to local legend, a hanging tree once stood at the junction of the two roads, and those who died there still haunt the area.

Scottish singer Barbara Dickson, OBE, briefly lived in Navenby in the 1970s.

== Public services ==
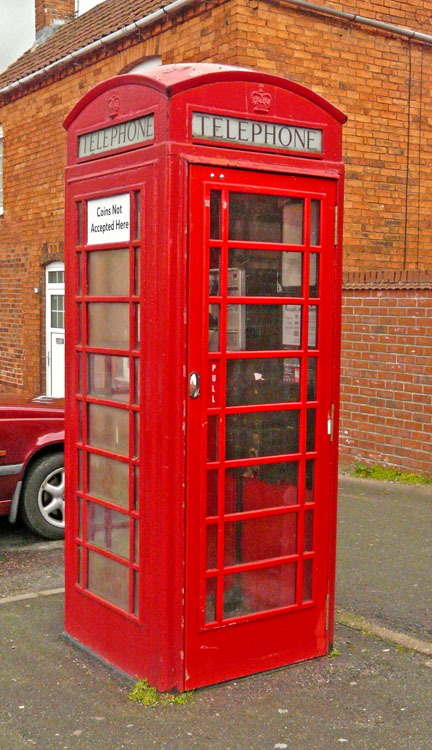
Navenby's Grade II listed public phone box

Navenby's water is supplied by the Anglian Water company, and there is a sewage treatment works just west of the village.

Healthcare is provided by the United Lincolnshire Hospitals NHS Trust, and a doctors' surgery operates in North Lane. The nearest NHS hospital is Lincoln County Hospital, Greetwell Road, Lincoln, which is 8.7 miles (14 km) north of Navenby. The second closest is Grantham and District Hospital, Manthorpe Rd, Grantham. The nearest dentists are also based in Lincoln or Grantham. The East Midlands Ambulance Service NHS Trust operates ambulances in the Navenby area, and the village is also covered by The Lincolnshire and Nottinghamshire Air Ambulance, based at nearby Royal Air Force Waddington on the edge of Waddington village.

Other emergency services are provided by Lincolnshire Fire and Rescue, whose nearest fire stations are in Lincoln and Grantham, and the Lincolnshire Police Force. The nearest police stations are in Lincoln, Sleaford and Grantham.

== Sport and clubs ==
Navenby Juniors FC logo

Navenby has a bowls club, Navenby Bowls Club, with approximately 50 members. The bowls season lasts from May to August and club members take part in three Bowls Leagues; Division 3 of the Cliff Bowls League, Section C of the City Evening League and Division 3 of the Lincoln and District League. At least three evening matches are held each week during the season.

Navenby's FA Chartered Standard junior football club, Navenby Juniors, has teams from Under 7 to Under 18's playing in the Grantham, Mid Lincs and Newark leagues, and a Development Squad for boys and girls aged 4 to 5.

Nearby Lincoln has a professional football team, Lincoln City F.C., nicknamed "The Imps", which plays at the Sincil Bank stadium. Navenby villager Tracey Duxbury was a member of the Lady Imps team, the women's team attached to Lincoln City, until 2007. She became one of the youngest people to achieve the UEFA B coaching licence in 2006 and now plays with the West Ham United Ladies. More recently, Adam Crookes and Hayden Cann have played for Lincoln City, having represented and grown up in Navenby respectively.

Other clubs include Navenby History Group, which aims to uncover the village's extensive historic past. There is also the Women's Institute, which has celebrated its 40th anniversary in 2007, and Artists of Navenby, a 40-strong group of artists.

== See also ==
- List of civil parishes in Lincolnshire
