= Wellingore =

Village and civil parish in the North Kesteven district of Lincolnshire, England

Coordinates: 53.098857°N 0.533291°W

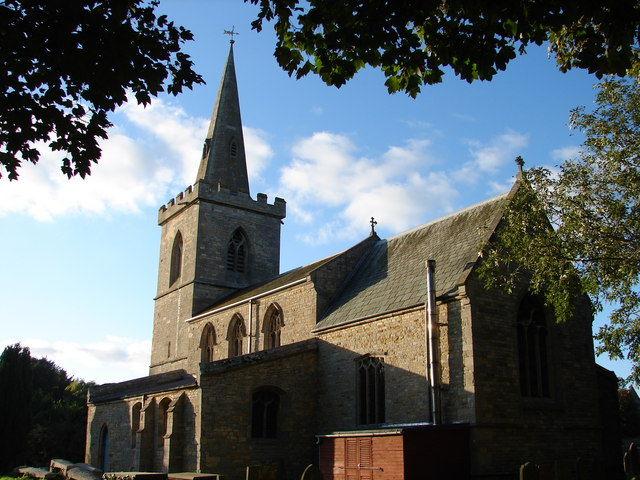
- All Saints' Church, Wellingore

- Location within Lincolnshire
- Population: 356 (2011)
- OS grid reference: SK983567
  - London: 110 mi (180 km) S
- District: North Kesteven
- Shire county: Lincolnshire
- Region: East Midlands
- Country: England
- Sovereign state: United Kingdom
- Post town: LINCOLN
- Postcode district: LN5
- Police: Lincolnshire
- Fire: Lincolnshire
- Ambulance: East Midlands
- UK Parliament: Sleaford and North Hykeham (UK Parliament constituency)

Wellingore is a village and civil parish in the North Kesteven district of Lincolnshire, England. The population of the civil parish at the 2011 census was 356. It is situated on the A607 road, approximately 12 miles (19 km) south from Lincoln. It conjoins the village of Navenby to the north. The Viking Way traverses through the village, passing from the side of the cliff edge to Ermine Street.

William White ‘'History, Gazetteer, and Directory of Lincolnshire,’’, 1856.
Wellingore, ten miles S. of Lincoln, and N.W. of Sleaford, is a large village, pleasantly situated on the western verge of the bold ridge of the heath hills, called the Cliff range…. Its parish contains 914 souls and 2987 acres. 2 roods and 28 perches of land. Henry Nevile Esq. is lord of the Manor and owner of a great part of the soil. . The Chaplin, Ashton, Reeve, Brown and other families have estates here. The Hall…….was the seat of the late Colonel Nevile, who had assumed the name of Noel. Hill House is the pleasant seat of Mathew Ashton Esq. The Church (All Saints) is a neat Gothic fabric, with a tower surmounted by an octagonal spire… now valued at £206, in the patronage of the Dean and Chapter of Lincoln, who are also the appropriators of the rectory, to which £472acres, 2 roods 39 perches were allotted at the time of enclosure, when 103 acres, 20 perches were allotted in lieu of tithes. The Rev. John Peacock is the incumbent, and has a neat stone vicarage house, commanding extensive views. There is in the village a Wesleyan Chapel, and an ancient stone cross. . The school, erected about five years ago … has about 80 scholars.

— Published by William White, Sheffield 1856, pg. 343..

The name 'Wellingore' is thought to derive from the Old English for 'ridge at the place with the spring/stream'.

== Population ==
In 1801 there was a resident population of 559, which peaked to 943 in 1861. In the 1971 census there were 618 people recorded.

== Buildings in Wellingore ==
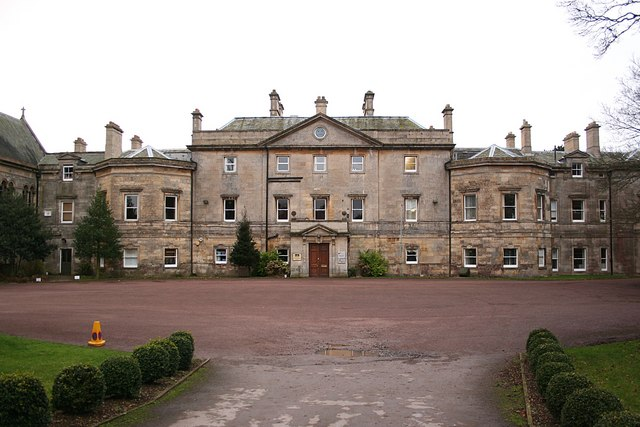
Wellingore Hall

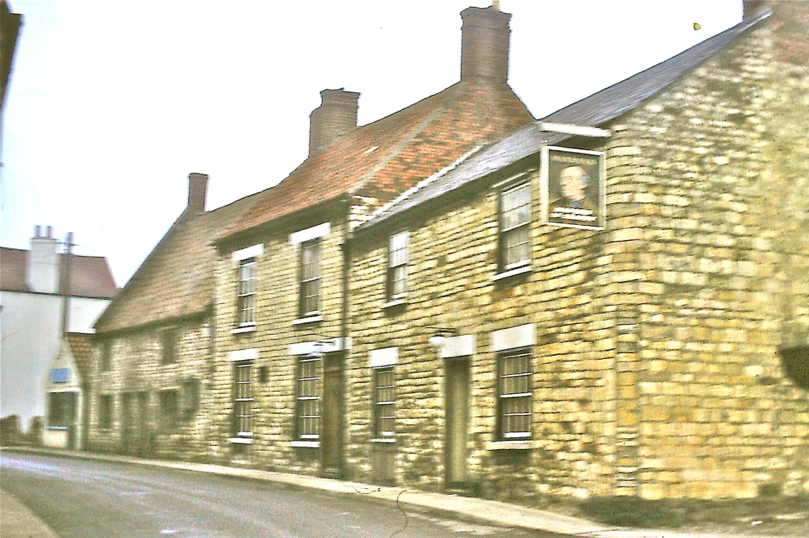
Wellingore High Street in 1973 with the Marquis of Granby in foreground.

Wellingore is an attractive village with many of the older houses built in the local limestone. Wellingore was the first village in North Kesteven to be designated a Conservation Area in February 1971. The following buildings are of particular interest:

- All Saints Church Wellingore
- Wellingore Hall. The largest building in Wellingore is Wellingore Hall.
- The Manor House, The Green.
- Hill House, Barnes Lane
- Village public houses are the Marquis of Granby and the Red Lion Inn, both on High Street.

== RAF Wellingore ==
RAF Wellingore opened in 1935 and operated for ten years until it was decommissioned in 1945. It originally opened in 1917 as RFC Wellingore Heath. The control tower was demolished, but several pillboxes and the Battle HQ building still exist.
