= RAF Wellingore =

Former fighter aircraft station

RAF Wellingore
- Wellingore, Lincolnshire in England
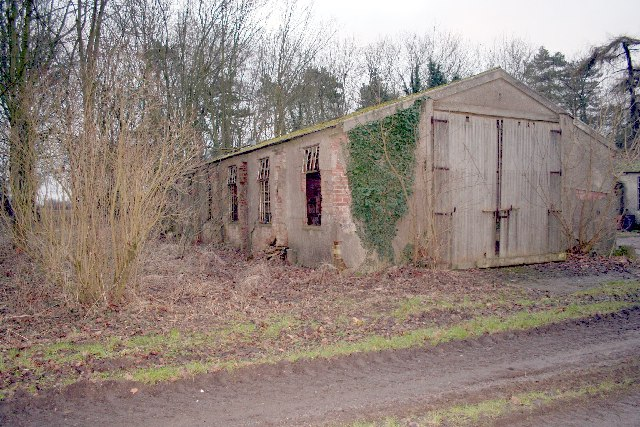
- Technical Site for RAF Wellingore

Site information
- Type: Relief Landing Ground
- Code: JW
- Owner: Air Ministry
- Operator: Royal Air Force
- Controlled by: RAF Fighter Command * No. 12 Group RAF; 1940-44; RAF Flying Training Command

Location
- Shown within Lincolnshire
- Coordinates: 53°04′42″N 000°31′30″W

Site history
- Built: 1934/35
- In use: 1935 - 1945
- Battles/wars: European theatre of World War II

Airfield information
- Elevation: 79 metres (259 ft) AMSL
Runways
| Direction | Length and surface |
|---|---|
| 00/00 | Grass |
| 00/00 | Grass |

Royal Air Force Wellingore or more simply RAF Wellingore is a former Royal Air Force fighter relief landing ground located 1.9 miles (3.1 km) south of Navenby, Lincolnshire and 10 miles (16 km) south of Lincoln, Lincolnshire, England.

== History ==
The airfield was originally opened in 1917 as a Royal Naval Air Service station called Wellingore Heath. The airfield reopened in 1935. By the winter of 1939/40, the airfield was fully operational and consisted of two grass runways, a concrete perimeter track and several hangars. It initially operated as a Relief Landing Ground (RLG) for RAF Cranwell before later operating as a RLG for RAF Digby. Various squadrons equipped with Spitfires, Hurricanes, Blenheims and Beaufighters flew from the station.

The airfield was closed in 1947.

=== Squadrons ===
- No. 29 Squadron RAF (Blenheim then Beaufighter night fighters) - July 1940 to April 1941
- No. 402 Squadron RCAF (Hurricanes) - May 1941 to June 1941 & (Spitfires) January 1944 to April 1944
- No. 412 Squadron RCAF (Spitfires) - October 1941 to May 1942
- No. 54 Squadron RAF - June 1942 to June 1942
- No. 81 Squadron RAF (Spitfires) - September 1942 to October 1942
- No. 154 (Motor Industries) Squadron RAF (Spitfires) - September 1942 to November 1942
- No. 288 Squadron RAF - December 1942 to January 1943
- No. 309 Polish Fighter-Reconnaissance Squadron
- No. 349 (Belgian) Squadron RAF (Spitfires) May 1943
- No. 416 Squadron RCAF (Spitfires) - May 1943 to June 1943 & September 1943 to October 1943
- No. 439 Squadron RCAF (Hurricanes) - August 1943
- No. 613 (City of Manchester) Squadron AAF (Mustangs) - April 1943 to May 1943
- No. 17 Service Flying Training School RAF (Harvards and Oxfords)- 1944-45

Units

- No. 3 (Coastal) Operational Training Unit RAF
- No. 11 Service Flying Training School RAF
- No. 17 Service Flying Training School RAF
- No. 19 Flying Training School RAF
- No. 56 OTU
- No. 2953 Squadron RAF Regiment

=== John Gillespie Magee Jr ===
In December 1941, John Gillespie Magee, Jr., author of the famous aviation poem "High Flight", took off from Wellingore on his final flight, in which he was killed.

=== Guy Gibson ===
In November 1940, Guy Gibson, who later led Operation Chastise (better known as the Dambusters Raid), was stationed at Wellingore. Later in November 1940, he flew from Wellingore to Cardiff for his wedding. He had his first victories as a nightfighter pilot operating from here. In April 1942, a German intruder aircraft attacked Gibson's aircraft while landing at Wellingore, injuring his navigator.

== Post-war use ==
The station was used as a prisoner of war camp before being handed back to the local land owner. Many of the original buildings, including the control have been demolished. A number of airfield defence concrete bunkers remain dotted around the airfield which has been returned to agricultural use.

== See also ==
- List of former Royal Air Force stations
