= Stephen Phillips (British politician) =

British politician

Stephen Phillips KC

Member of Parliament for Sleaford and North Hykeham
- In office 6 May 2010 – 4 November 2016
- Preceded by: Douglas Hogg
- Succeeded by: Caroline Johnson

Personal details
- Born: Stephen James Phillips; 9 March 1970 (age 56) Chiswick, London, England
- Party: Conservative (until 2016)
- Spouse: Fiona née Goldsby (m. 1998; div. 2013)
- Education: Oriel College, Oxford

Stephen James Phillips KC (born 9 March 1970) is a British Conservative Party politician, barrister and recorder (part-time Crown Court judge). He represented the constituency of Sleaford and North Hykeham as its Member of Parliament (MP) from 2010 until his resignation on 4 November 2016, when he announced that he was standing down with immediate effect owing to his irreconcilable policy differences with the government.

== Early life and education ==
Stephen Phillips was born in London on 9 March 1970. He was the son of Stewart Charles Phillips, a civil servant, and his wife Janice Frances née Woodhall. He attended St. Mary's and Hardye's School, prior to being privately educated at Canford School, Dorset, for A Levels, attending Oriel College, Oxford, from 1988 to 1992, where he graduated with a BA degree (proceeding MA [Oxon]) in Jurisprudence (Law) in 1991; he pursued postgraduate studies at Oxford University, receiving a Bachelor of Civil Law (BCL) in 1992.

After studying to become a barrister at the Inns of Court School of Law, he was called to the Bar at Lincoln's Inn in 1993. He took silk (QC), and since 2009 has also served as a recorder. He was chairman of the governing body of Frank Barnes School, one of the few sign-bilingual schools for deaf people in Britain.

Phillips served a short commission in the British Army, as a Welsh Guards officer. In 2008, he contested a by-election for Hampstead Town ward (where he lives) on Camden London Borough Council, that had been triggered by the resignation of the Conservative incumbent, but lost to the Liberal Democrats.

== Parliamentary career ==
Phillips entered the House of Commons in 2010 as Member of Parliament for Sleaford and North Hykeham, being its second parliamentary representative since the constituency was created, following Douglas Hogg.

Phillips sat on the European Scrutiny Committee, the Public Accounts Committee and the committee for the Defamation Bill. He showed "his anger and disappointment" with Lin Homer, head of HMRC, who he said had allowed HSBC to get away "scot free" with large-scale tax avoidance. He attracted criticism from some for spending around 1,700 hours annually working as a barrister whilst serving as an MP. Phillips described his own parliamentary attendance record as "excellent", stating that his outside work "doesn't affect the way in which I perform as an MP", and accused his critics of "envy" over his yearly £750,000 earnings from his legal work.

In November 2016, he resigned as an MP, saying that he had "irreconcilable policy differences" with the government of Theresa May. Phillips had previously said that he believed the government was becoming more right-wing, and that its attempts to begin negotiations to leave the EU without consulting Parliament were "divisive and plain wrong". Formally, he was appointed Steward and Bailiff of the Manor of Northstead in North Yorkshire.

== Personal life ==
From 1998 to 2013, Phillips married Fiona née Goldsby, a barrister and QC. Together they have three children. He divides his time between London and his home in Lincolnshire.

== See also ==
- Courts of England and Wales
- Public Accounts Committee (United Kingdom)

Parliament of the United Kingdom
Preceded by Douglas Hogg	Member of Parliament for Sleaford and North Hykeham; 2010–2016	Succeeded by Caroline Johnson
