= Branston, Lincolnshire =

Village in Lincolnshire, England

Coordinates: 53.1944°N 0.4717°W

Branston
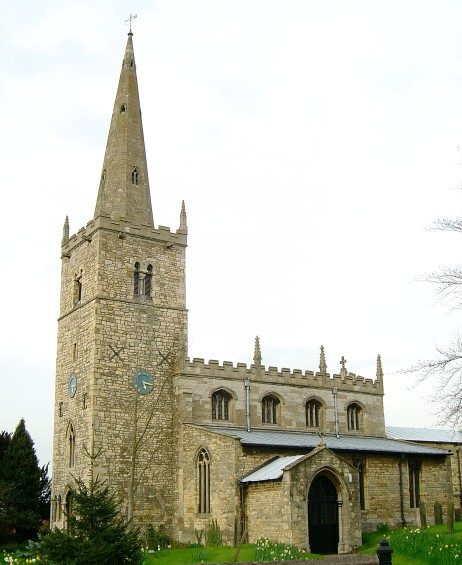
- All Saints' Church in 2005

- Location within Lincolnshire
- Area: 1.563 km^{2} (0.603 sq mi)
- Population: 4,283 (2021 Census)
  - Density: 2,740/km^{2} (7,100/sq mi)
- OS grid reference: TF021673
  - London: 120 mi (190 km) S
- Civil parish: Branston and Mere
- District: North Kesteven
- Shire county: Lincolnshire
- Region: East Midlands
- Country: England
- Sovereign state: United Kingdom
- Post town: LINCOLN
- Postcode district: LN4
- Dialling code: 01522
- Police: Lincolnshire
- Fire: Lincolnshire
- Ambulance: East Midlands
- UK Parliament: Sleaford and North Hykeham

Branston is a large village in the civil parish of Branston and Mere, in the North Kesteven district of Lincolnshire, England, 4 miles (6 km) south-east of Lincoln on the B1188 road to Sleaford. In 2021 it had a population of 4283. It is the principal settlement in the parish of Branston and Mere.

== History ==
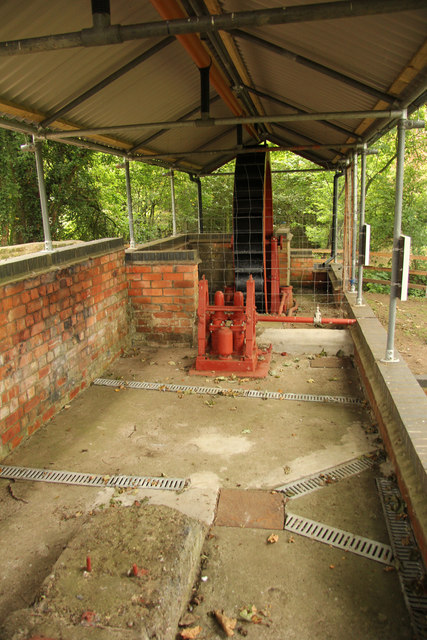
Waterwheel formerly used to supply several country houses from the beck

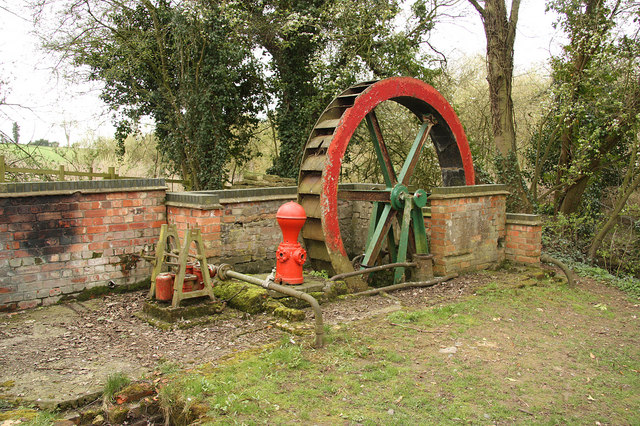
19thC water pump on Waterwheel Lane in 2010

Neolithic and Bronze Age axes have been found in the village, including ten Bronze Age axes in the grounds of Branston Hall in 1906. Evidence has also been found of a Roman villa or villa farm near Folly Lane: a Roman memorial stone, part of a statue, a bronze candlestick and pottery fragments. The inscription on the Roman memorial stone is incomplete but has been translated as 'In this estate (lie the bones of) Aurelia Concessa, a very pure girl'.

The 1086 Domesday Book records a village population of 350, a figure which stayed relatively stable until the 19th century. In the 19th century the population almost tripled, rising to 1216 in 1901. In the 20th century the population trebled further, to exceed 4000. The character of the village changed much over the second half of the 20th century, but Branston has retained much of its historic centre, where the majority of buildings are constructed from local limestone.

The 'Bran' in 'Branston' may refer to a leader with the Norse name 'Brandr', in which case the name was probably coined during the Danelaw in the 9th–11th centuries, or it could be from the same Saxon root as 'bourne' in Old English and 'burn' in Scots, referring to the three streams in the village. In the Domesday book it is listed as Branztune or Branztone. In the Norman Conquest, land in Branston was passed from Haminc (Hemming, a thegn of Blankney) to Walter de Aincurt (a Norman Baron and kinsman of Remigius de Fécamp). In 1219 the De Aincurt estate passed from Oliver De Aincurt to his wife Amabila Camville, who remarried to Henry Le Eueske. Farming in Branston followed an open-field system, with commons for grazing, until Enclosure in 1765.

The village's most notable buildings are Branston Hall, built 1884–86 and Branston All Saints' Church (parts dating to the 11th century). Branston Hall was preceded by Branston old hall, dating to 1735, which burnt down in 1903. There was also a major fire at Branston All Saints Church on Christmas Day in 1962.

Other historic buildings include a rectory house, built in 1765, and a Wesleyan Methodist chapel, built in 1883, which is of Gothic style, previously seated 300 and closed in 1998. An earlier Methodist chapel, beside it, became a Sunday school. A former public primary school on Branston High Street was built in 1873, and preceded by a fee-paying school on Hall Lane, built in 1837. Opposite the church still stands a blacksmith's forge.

Two other public houses were once located in the village; The Plough which stood on the High Street opposite the Waggon and Horses, which was demolished in the 1970s to straighten a dangerous bend at the centre of the village, and the Bertie Arms, a small public house on Hall Lane, long ago converted into a private dwelling. The Bertie Arms was named after the family which built Branston old hall. The building now occupied by the Home Guard Club was formerly a hops store. 19th-century communal water pumps have been preserved on Hall Lane and Waterwheel Lane. The village used to have a railway station which was in the parish of Heighington. Before then, Station Road was called Heighington Road. Silver Street was formerly known as Bleak Street.

A memorial to men of the parish killed in the First World War was erected on the village green in 1920.

In 1921 the civil parish had a population of 1275. The civil parish of Branston was merged with that of Mere to form the present unit on 1 April 1931. In the early 1930s parish occupations included twenty-one farmers and one smallholder, two poultry breeders, a horse dealer, a haulage contractor, two coal dealers, a motor bus proprietor, a cycle dealer, a fried fish dealer, three blacksmiths, a wheelwright, a plumber, two carpenters, a boot maker, two butchers, two grocers, three shopkeepers, two tailors, one of whom ran the post office, and four pub landlords.

Abel Smith Gardens was built on former allotments. In July 1977, more than fifty children from Branston Junior Academy had to go to Lincoln County Hospital after a crop spraying aircraft inadvertently sprayed their playground. The insecticide was a mixture of meta-systox and aphox; organophosphate and carbamate compounds designed to clear crops of aphids. A hotel called Moor Lodge Hotel stood on Moor Lane until it was demolished in 2005 to make way for housing.

== Geography and ecology ==
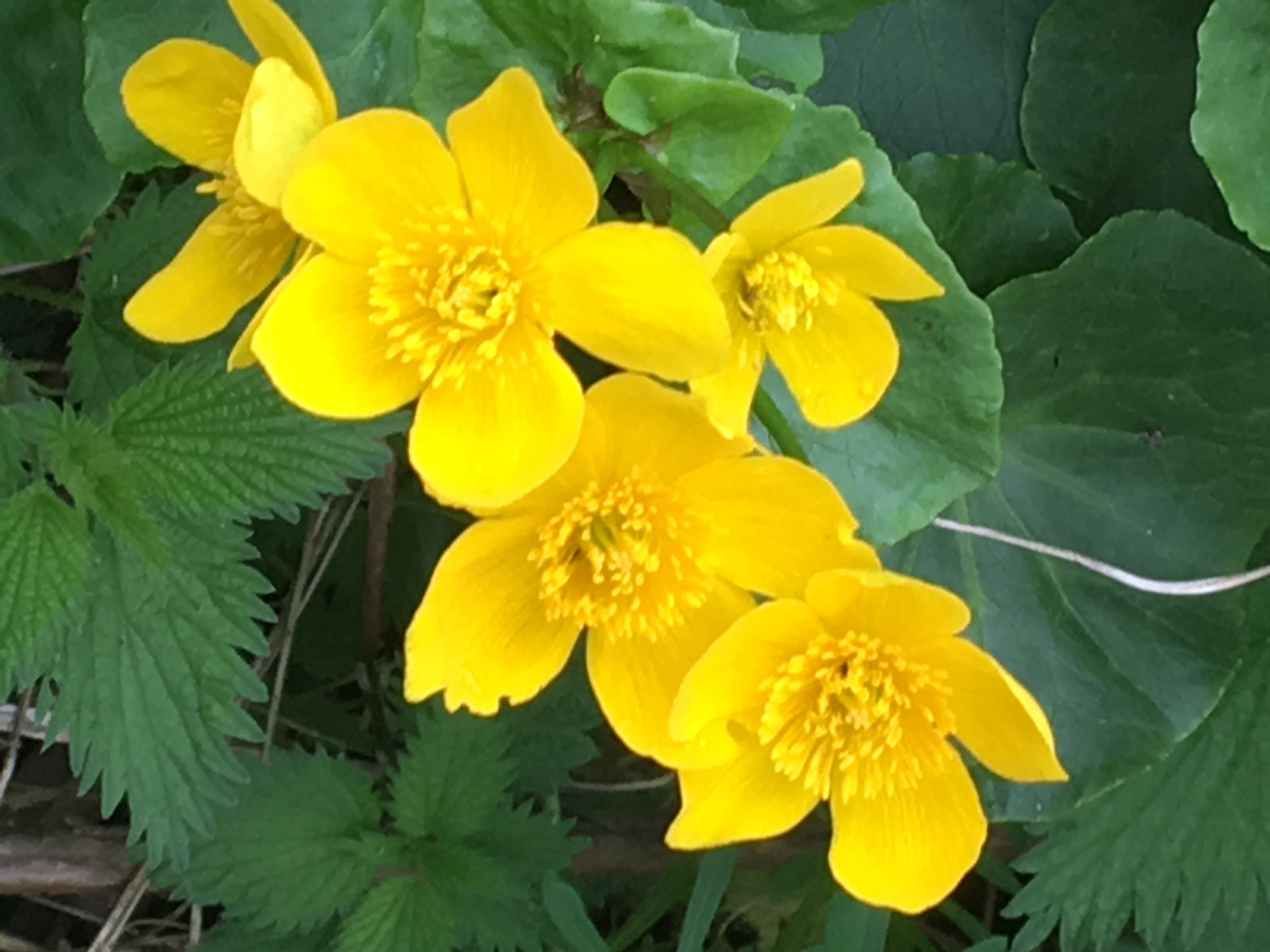
Caltha palustris (marsh-marigold), one of many native wildflowers found in Branston Jungle Local Nature Reserve

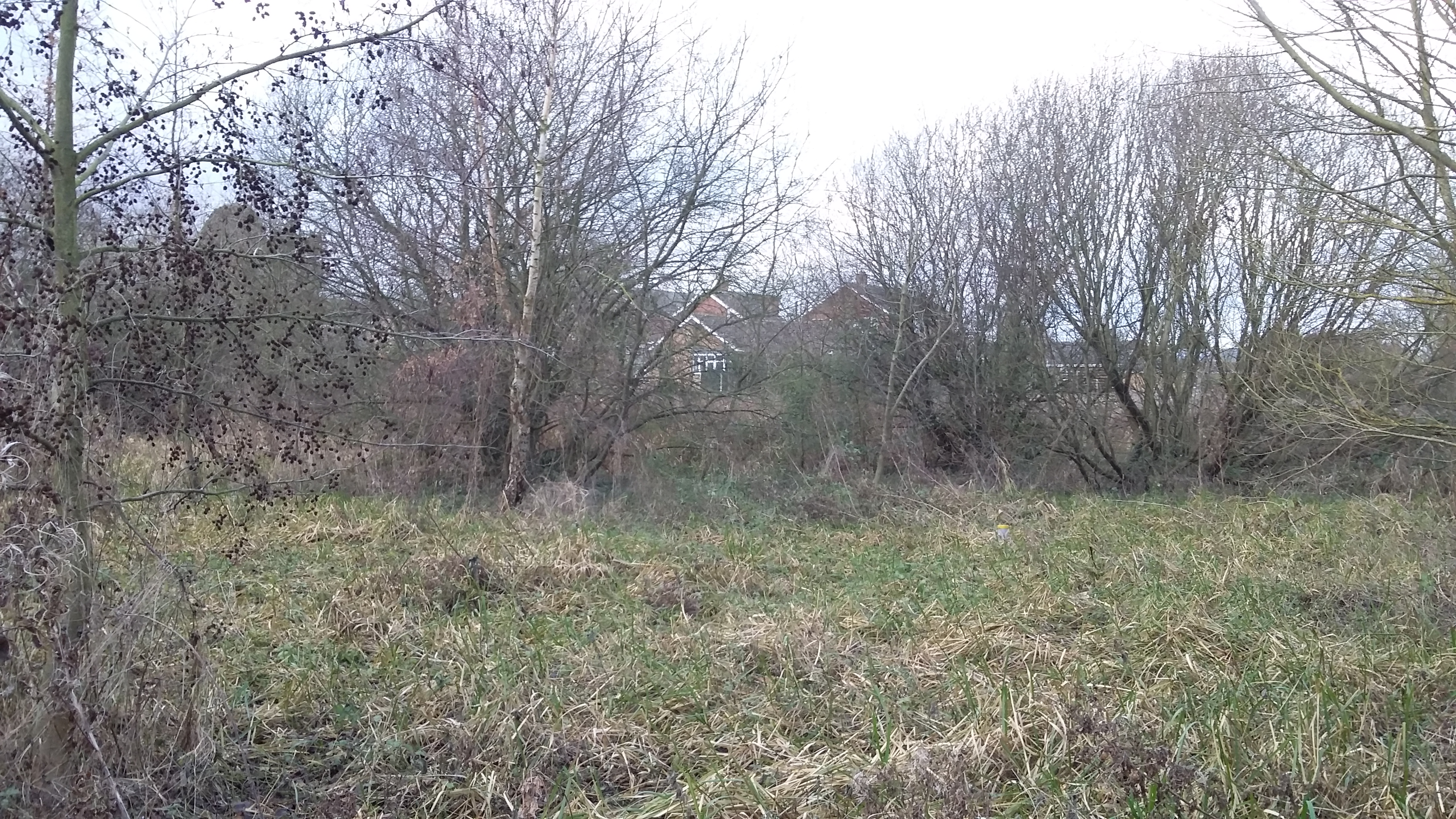
Branston Jungle Local Nature Reserve in December 2016, alder, sallow and birch trees and much reed sweet grass

Most of the village is around 45 metres (148 ft) above sea level. It is built around the shallow valleys of three limestone streams which originate within 3 miles (4.8 km) of the village, at Westfield Farm, at Mere Farm and near Highfield House. These merge and flow northwards, joining the River Witham at Washingborough. Smaller freshwater springs have been found in the valleys.

The bedrock under the village is Jurassic limestone. Fossils in it are mostly marine animals, including ammonites, crinoids and coral, reflecting the fact that the area was under the sea for much of prehistory.

Arable farmland now dominates the surrounding countryside. The main crops are wheat, barley and potatoes. Sheep, horses and pigs are also raised in the village. Wildlife found in the arable fields includes barn owl, linnet and northern lapwing. A marsh occupies the valley in the middle of the village, part of which is designated a Local Nature Reserve. The marsh is fed by two of the village streams but also probably by freshwater springs. Wildlife found in the local nature reserve, known as Branston Jungle, includes water rail, common frog, blackcap, hops, yellow flag iris and alder. Woodlands surrounding Branston Hall Hotel and within the boundary of the Village Conservation Area feature a range of woodland wildflowers as well as tawny owls, stoats and jays.

== Amenities ==
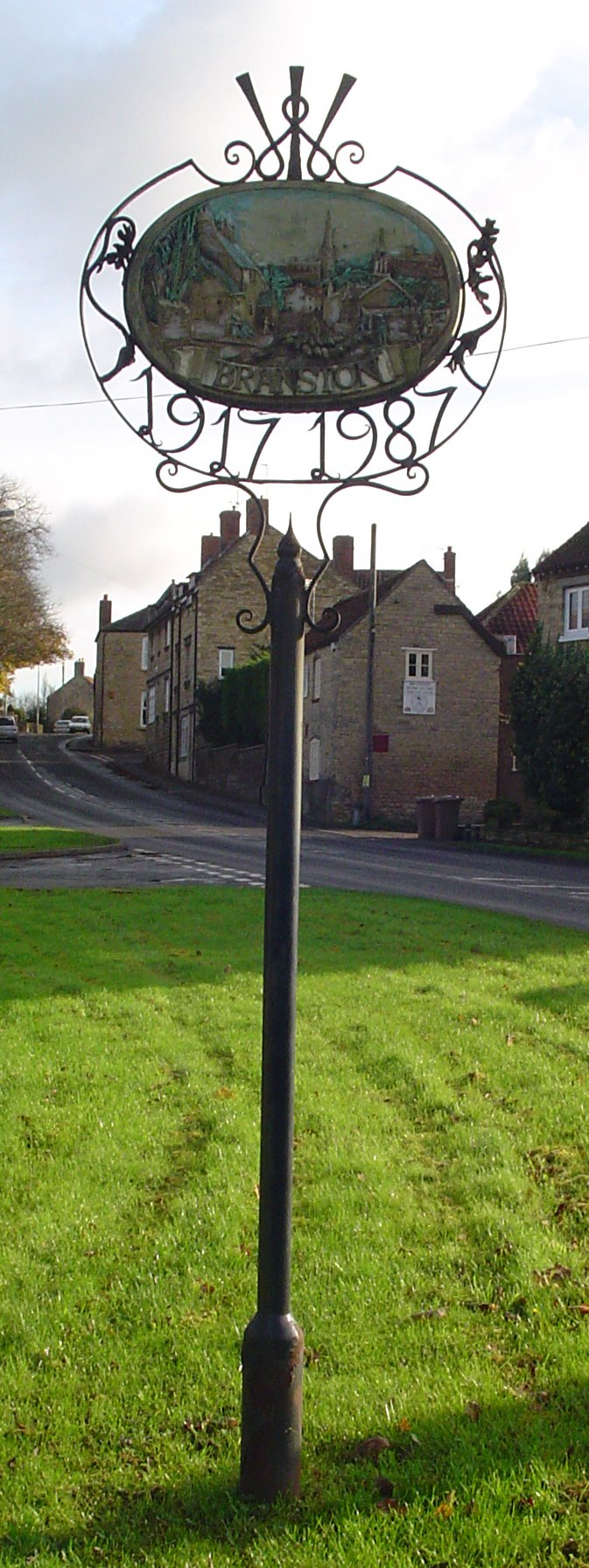
Village sign in Branston

Branston has one public house, the Waggon and Horses, a modern building which stands on the High Street close to the historic centre of the village. About 110 yards (100 m) farther along the High Street is the Home Guard Club, a private members club. The bar at Branston Hall Hotel is open to visitors and residents. There is a café on the High Street and a supermarket on Station Road. There are four takeaway restaurants. Social activities take place at the Church Hall on Church Hill as well as at the Village Hall on Lincoln Road.

Public recreation grounds can be found on Lincoln Road and Moor Lane. There are tennis courts, a skate park and lawns for bowls. Herons Fitness operate a swimming pool at Branston Community Academy. Pottergate Golf Club is on Moor Lane. There are three hairdressers, beauty salons and a spa. In the village there are social clubs for knitting, gardening and Lego construction. An annual garden show takes place at the Village Hall on Lincoln Road and there is a Christmas Market each winter, located close to the church.

There are two doctors' surgeries in the village; one on Station Road and the other on Beech Road. Lincoln County Hospital is only five miles away. Creche facilities are available at the Infant School and on the grounds of Branston Community Academy. Also at Branston Community Academy secondary school, there is a medium-sized public library run by volunteers. Branston All Saints' Church is an Anglican place of worship.

== Education ==
Branston C of E Infant School is located on Beech Road, to the northern end of the village. Branston Junior Academy is located on Station Road, close to the Co-op supermarket. Branston's secondary school is Branston Community Academy, situated on the outskirts of the village on the road to Heighington; the public library is situated in the school. Further education opportunities include Branston Community Academy Sixth Form and Lincoln College. Due to the concentration of schools in the village, children travel to Branston for school from many nearby villages. The nearest Higher Education institutions are the University of Lincoln and Bishop Grosseteste University (four and five miles away, respectively.)

== Economy ==
Most local employment is the nearby city of Lincoln. Branston Potatoes, founded in 1968, employs 863 people nationwide as of 2025. The three schools in the village also provide employment.

A 94 hectare solar park was built between Mere Road and Sleaford Road, to generate electricity for the National Grid. It has been estimated that it will produce enough electricity to power 15,000 homes. Planning permission is temporary, for 35 years, after which time it may be dismantled and returned to agricultural use.

There has been a recent decline in retail businesses in the village, despite population growth. Since 1990 Branston has lost all its newsagents and post offices, as well as its hardware store and greengrocer.

Formerly, the local economy was based around wool production, as evidenced by the remains of the sheepwash on Rectory Lane and the name of Dye House Farm. Wool and other goods were transported to the River Witham along Branston Causeway. In 2016 the artist James Sutton was commissioned by the Branston Christmas Market Committee and Branston History Group to produce a metal sculpture called 'Lincoln Longwool Sheep Heading for the Sheepwash', located on the High Street, to commemorate this past and a local variety of sheep, which has the longest fleece of any breed in the world. Wool production became uneconomical for most of the United Kingdom in the mid-20th century, due to cheap imports, and farmland in Lincolnshire transitioned away from mixed farming, to specialising in arable cropping.
