= Caroline Johnson =

British politician

Caroline Johnson MP
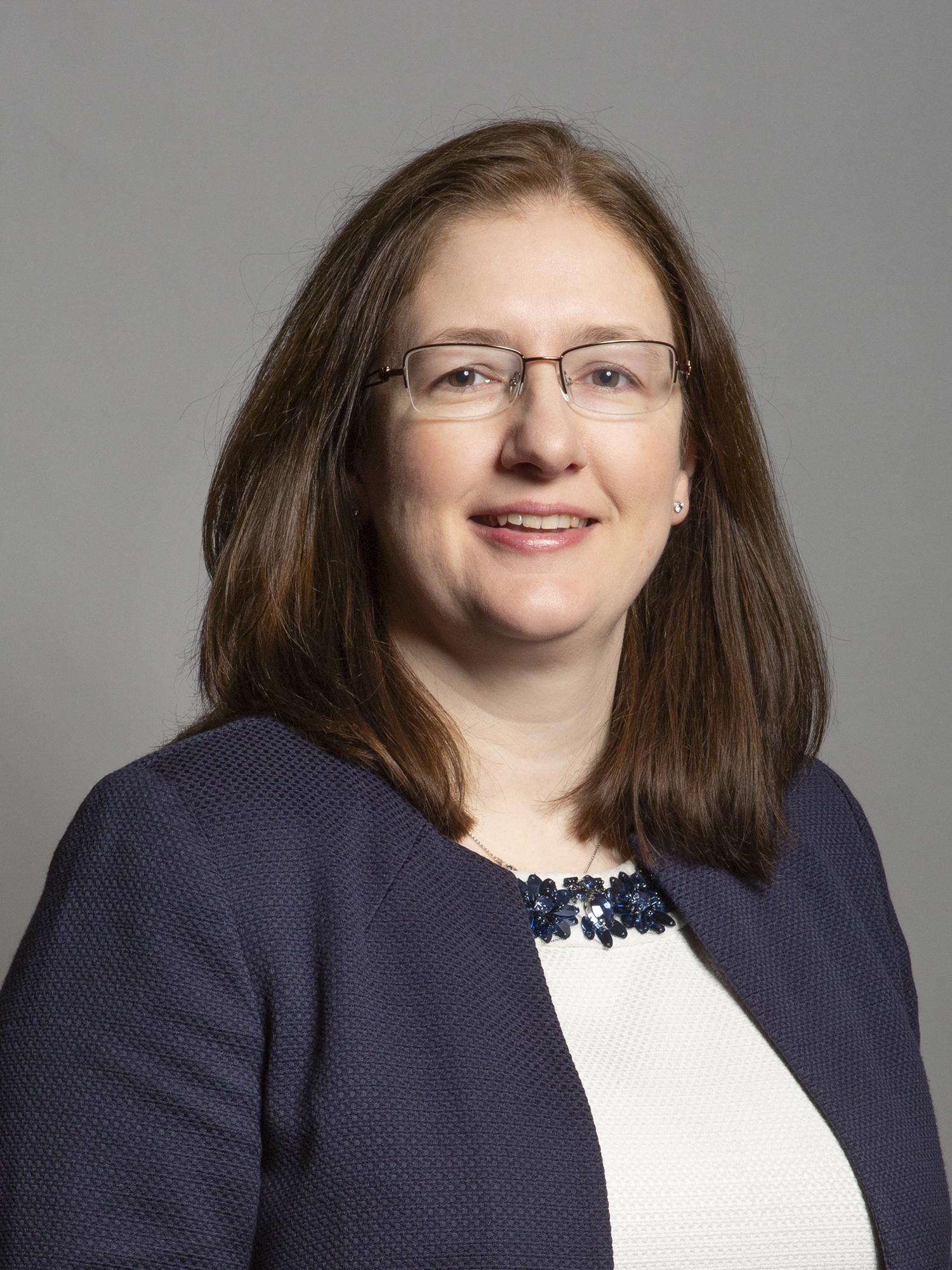
- Official portrait, 2019

Shadow Minister for Health and Social Care
- Incumbent
- Assumed office 19 July 2024 Serving with Luke Evans
- Leader: Rishi Sunak; Kemi Badenoch
- Preceded by: Karin Smyth

Parliamentary Under-Secretary of State for Mental Health and Public Health
- In office 8 September 2022 – 27 October 2022
- Prime Minister: Liz Truss; Rishi Sunak
- Preceded by: Gillian Keegan (Note: As Minister of State for Care and Mental Health)
- Succeeded by: Maria Caulfield (Note: As Parliamentary Under-Secretary of State for Mental Health and Women's Health Strategy)

Member of Parliament for Sleaford and North Hykeham
- Incumbent
- Assumed office 8 December 2016
- Preceded by: Stephen Phillips
- Majority: 4,346 (8.9%)

Personal details
- Born: Caroline Elizabeth Burton; 31 December 1977 (age 48) Middlesbrough, England
- Party: Conservative
- Spouse: Nik Johnson (m. 2001)
- Children: 3
- Education: Gordonstoun
- Alma mater: Newcastle University (MB BS)
- Occupation: Politician; doctor

Caroline Elizabeth Johnson (née Burton; born 31 December 1977) is a British Conservative Party politician and consultant paediatrician who has been the Member of Parliament (MP) for Sleaford and North Hykeham since 2016. She served as Parliamentary Under-Secretary of State for Mental Health and Public Health from September to October 2022. She has been Shadow Minister for Health and Social Care since July 2024.

== Early life and career ==
Caroline Burton was born on 31 December 1977 in Middlesbrough. She attended Gordonstoun, a private school in Moray. She graduated from Newcastle University Medical School in 2001.

Johnson became a senior house officer in 2002, a paediatrics specialist registrar in 2005; and a consultant in 2012.

== Parliamentary career ==
Johnson stood as the Conservative candidate in Scunthorpe at the 2010 general election, coming second with 32.6% of the vote behind the Labour candidate Nic Dakin.

In the June 2016 European Union membership referendum, Johnson voted for Brexit.

Johnson was selected in November 2016 as the Conservative candidate for the 2016 Sleaford and North Hykeham by-election. She was elected to Parliament as MP for Sleaford and North Hykeham with 53.5% of the vote and a majority of 13,144.

At the snap 2017 general election, Johnson was re-elected as MP for Sleaford and North Hykeham with an increased vote share of 64.2% and a majority of 25,237. Following the election, she was chosen to be part of the Health and Social Care Select Committee and the Environment, Food and Rural Affairs Committee. She served on the Health and Social Care Select Committee until February 2018 and Environment, Food and Rural Affairs Committee until November 2019.

Johnson voted for then Prime Minister Theresa May's Brexit withdrawal agreement and against any referendum on a withdrawal agreement in March 2019.

She supported Boris Johnson in the 2019 Conservative Party leadership election. Following his election as prime minister, she voted for his Brexit withdrawal agreement in October 2019.

At the 2019 general election, Johnson was again re-elected with an increased vote share of 67.1% and an increased majority of 32,565.

She was a member of the Education Select Committee between March 2020 and October 2022. Johnson rejoined the Health and Social Care Select Committee in November 2022.

During the July 2022 United Kingdom government crisis, Johnson resigned as the Vice Chair of the Conservative Party on 7 July, after over 50 previous resignations of MPs and ministers, criticising then Prime Minister Boris Johnson's "errors of judgement" and calling for his resignation. After the election of Liz Truss as prime minister in September 2022, she was appointed as a Parliamentary Under-Secretary of State in the Department of Health and Social Care. Following Truss' resignation, she supported Johnson's bid to return as PM in the October 2022 Conservative Party leadership election.

From September 2022, Johnson became chair of the All Party Parliamentary Groups (APPG) for Children who need Palliative Care.

In March 2023, Johnson was re-selected as the Conservative candidate for Sleaford and North Hykeham at the 2024 general election.

In July 2023, Johnson opened a debate on planning to voice her opposition to new large solar farms as she felt that it would "dramatically alter the landscape for the worse" and reduce the availability of arable land.

At the 2024 general election, Johnson was again re-elected, with a decreased vote share of 35.7% and a decreased majority of 4,346.

== Personal life ==
Caroline married Nik Johnson in 2001 and they have three children. He owns a fertiliser business. They live in Sudbrook, Lincolnshire.

In addition to her parliamentary duties, she continues to work part-time as a consultant paediatrician in Peterborough City Hospital and earns a salary of £26,211.60 for 336 hours annually as of June 2026.

In 2024 she took part in her first marathon, the London Marathon, in aid of the special care baby charity Bliss. Her finish time of 7:47:32 was the slowest of any MP in the race.

== Notes ==
Parliament of the United Kingdom
Preceded by Stephen Phillips	Member of Parliament for Sleaford and North Hykeham; 2016–present	Incumbent
