= Pirimicarb =

Names
- Preferred IUPAC name 2-(Dimethylamino)-5,6-dimethylpyrimidin-4-yl dimethylcarbamate

Identifiers
CAS Number	23103-98-2
3D model (JSmol)	Interactive image
ChEBI	CHEBI:8248
ChemSpider	29348
ECHA InfoCard	100.041.285
KEGG	C11079
PubChem CID	31645
UNII	1I93PS935T
CompTox Dashboard (EPA)	DTXSID1032569
- InChI: InChI=1S/C11H18N4O2/c1-7-8(2)12-10(14(3)4)13-9(7)17-11(16)15(5)6/h1-6H3 Key: YFGYUFNIOHWBOB-UHFFFAOYSA-N; InChI=1/C11H18N4O2/c1-7-8(2)12-10(14(3)4)13-9(7)17-11(16)15(5)6/h1-6H3 Key: YFGYUFNIOHWBOB-UHFFFAOYAL
- SMILES: CC1=C(N=C(N=C1OC(=O)N(C)C)N(C)C)C

Properties
Chemical formula	C_{11}H_{18}N_{4}O_{2}
Molar mass	238.29 g/mol
- Except where otherwise noted, data are given for materials in their standard state (at 25 °C [77 °F], 100 kPa). Infobox references

Pirimicarb is a selective carbamate insecticide used to control aphids on vegetable, cereal and orchard crops by inhibiting acetylcholinesterase activity but does not affect useful predators such as ladybirds that eat them. It was originally developed by Imperial Chemical Industries Ltd., now Syngenta, at their Jealott's Hill site and first marketed in 1969, four years after its discovery.
