= Sleaford and North Hykeham =

UK Parliament constituency (since 1997)

Coordinates: 53.05°N 0.50°W

- County constituency for the House of Commons
- Interactive map of boundaries since 2024
- Location within the East Midlands
- County: Lincolnshire
- Electorate: 73,380 (March 2020)
- Major settlements: Sleaford, North Hykeham

Current constituency
- Created: 1997
- Member of Parliament: Caroline Johnson (Conservative)
- Seats: One
- Created from: Grantham, Lincoln

Sleaford and North Hykeham is a parliamentary constituency (Note: A county constituency (for the purposes of election expenses and type of returning officer)) in Lincolnshire, England which elects a single Member of Parliament (MP) to the House of Commons of the UK Parliament. It has been represented since 2016 by Dr Caroline Johnson, who is a member of the Conservative Party. The seat was created in 1997 and has always been represented by Members of Parliament (MPs) from the Conservative Party; like all British constituencies, it elects one candidate by the first-past-the-post voting system. Johnson became the MP for the constituency after a by-election in December 2016, following the resignation of the previous MP for the seat, Stephen Phillips. The constituency is considered a safe seat for the Conservatives.

== Constituency profile ==
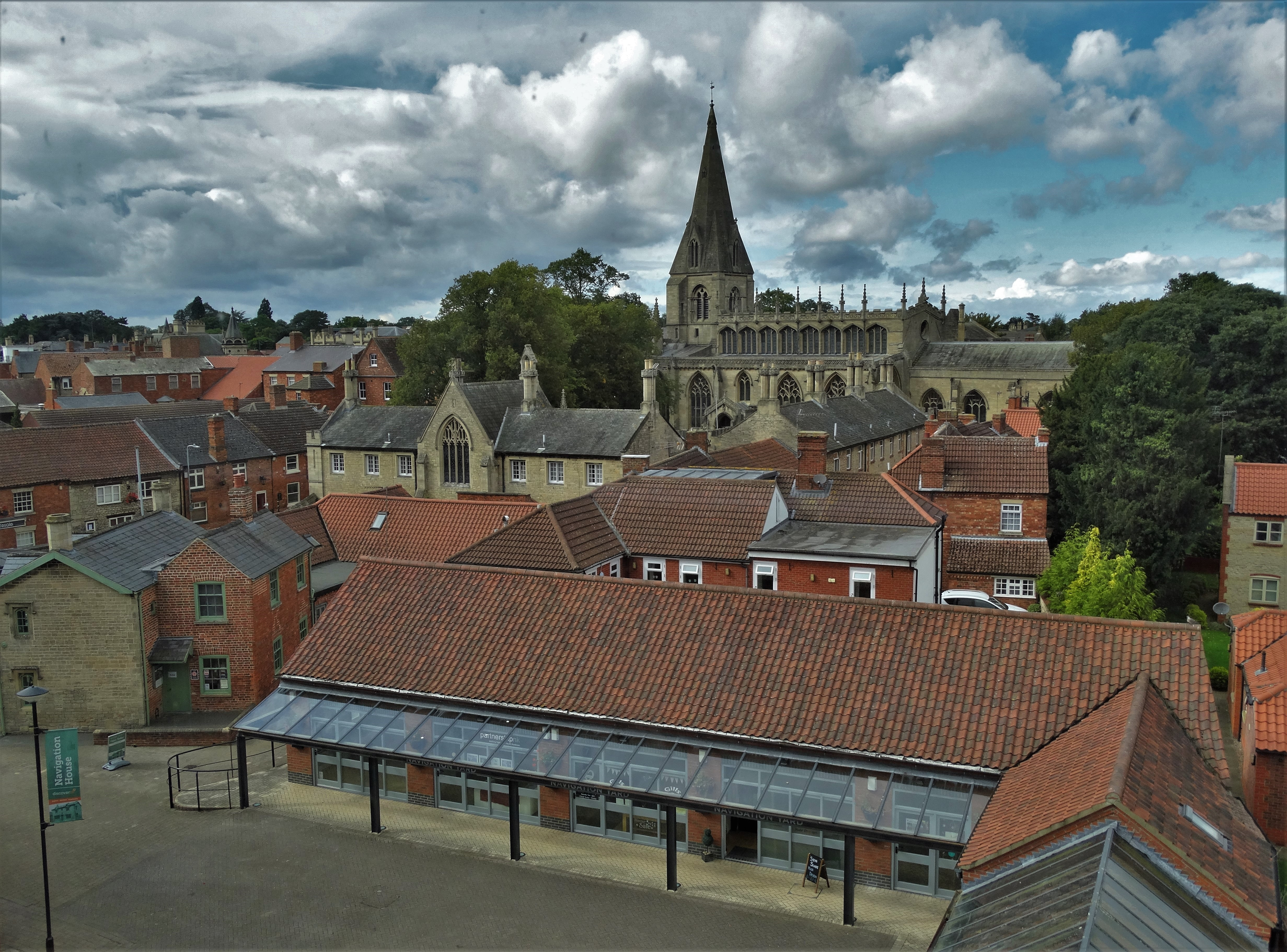
Sleaford

Sleaford and North Hykeham is a constituency in Lincolnshire in the East Midlands of England, covering most of the North Kesteven district. It is named after its two largest towns, Sleaford and North Hykeham, which each have populations of around 18,000. Other settlements include the villages of Witham St Hughs, Navenby, Cranwell, Ruskington, Metheringham, Branston, Washingborough and Heighington.

This is a large, rural constituency covering the towns and villages south of Lincoln. North Hykeham is a historic town contiguous with Lincoln that largely functions as a suburb of the city today. Sleaford is an important local centre for agricultural industry and trade. Much of the land surrounding the town was sold to property developers in the 1980s and Sleaford's population more than doubled over the next 30 years. This area's flat geography and sparse population made it favourable for the construction of Royal Air Force bases. Most have now been decommissioned, however RAF Digby and RAF Cranwell remain in operation, the latter serving as the force's officer training academy. This constituency is generally wealthy with low levels of deprivation, especially in North Hykeham. House prices across the constituency are similar to the rest of the East Midlands and lower than the UK average.

Sleaford and North Hykeham has a large retired population and low proportions of young and middle-aged adults. Residents have average levels of income, high rates of homeownership, and the child poverty rate is below-average. They have average levels of education and a high proportion work in the agriculture, manufacturing and construction sectors. The percentage of residents claiming unemployment benefits is around half the UK-wide rate. White people made up 97% of the population at the 2021 census.

At the local district council, most of the constituency is represented by Conservatives or independents. At the county council, which held elections more recently (in 2025), the rural areas elected Conservatives whilst the towns elected Reform UK representatives. Voters in Sleaford and North Hykeham strongly supported leaving the European Union in the 2016 referendum; an estimated 62% voted in favour of Brexit compared to the UK-wide figure of 52%.

== Boundaries ==
=== 1997–2010 ===
The District of North Kesteven except for the ward of Bracebridge Heath, and the District of South Kesteven wards of Ermine, Heath, Loveden, Saxonwell, and Witham Valley.

The constituency covers the towns of Sleaford and North Hykeham and a large area of rural Lincolnshire south west of Lindsey. The constituency's boundaries roughly correspond to those of North Kesteven local government district. In their formative proposals for 1997, the Boundary Commission for England proposed calling the new constituency Mid Lincolnshire, however the name was changed to its current form during the local inquiry process. The inclusion of North Hykeham in the constituency title was criticised by the author and psephologist Robert Waller in 1995, on the grounds that North Hykeham was effectively an overspill area of the City of Lincoln; however, not on the grounds of its actual inclusion, as its local government authority has long been seen as linked with the villages to the south in this seat, and wholly separate from the city.

=== 2010–2024 ===
The District of North Kesteven wards of Ashby de la Launde, Bassingham, Billinghay, Branston and Mere, Brant Broughton, Cliff Villages, Cranwell and Byard's Leap, Eagle and North Scarle, Heckington Rural, Heighington and Washingborough, Kyme, Leasingham and Roxholm, Martin, Metheringham, North Hykeham Forum, North Hykeham Memorial, North Hykeham Mill, North Hykeham Moor, North Hykeham Witham, Osbournby, Ruskington, Sleaford Castle, Sleaford Holdingham, Sleaford Mareham, Sleaford Navigation, Sleaford Quarrington, Sleaford Westholme, and Waddington West, and the District of South Kesteven wards of Barrowby, Ermine, Heath, Loveden, Peascliffe, Saxonwell, and Witham Valley.

Following another Boundary Commission review, the constituency boundaries with two of its neighbouring seats Lincoln and Grantham and Stamford were changed for the 2010 general election.

=== Current ===
Further to the 2023 review of Westminster constituencies, which came into effect for the 2024 general election, the composition of the constituency was defined as follows (as they existed on 1 December 2020):

- The District of North Kesteven wards of: Ashby de la Launde and Cranwell; Bassingham and Brant Broughton; Billinghay, Martin and North Kyme; Branston; Cliff Villages; Eagle, Swinderby and Witham St. Hughs; Heighington and Washingborough; Kirkby la Thorpe and South Kyme; Leasingham and Rauceby; Metheringham; North Hykeham Forum; North Hykeham Memorial; North Hykeham Mill; North Hykeham Moor; North Hykeham Witham; Ruskington; Sleaford Castle; Sleaford Holdingham; Sleaford Navigation; Sleaford Quarrington and Mareham; Sleaford Westholme; Waddington West.

In order to bring the electorate within the permitted range, the parts in the District of South Kesteven and the two North Kesteven wards of Heckington Rural and Osbournby were transferred to the new constituency of Grantham and Bourne.

Following a local government boundary review which came into effect in May 2023, the constituency now comprises the following wards of the District of North Kesteven from the 2024 general election:

- Ashby de la Launde, Digby & Scopwick; Bassingham Rural; Billinghay Rural; Branston; Cranwell, Leasingham & Wilsford (most); Heighington & Washingborough; Hykeham Central; Hykeham Fosse; Hykeham Memorial; Kirkby la Thorpe & South Kyme; Metheringham Rural; Navenby & Brant Broughton; Ruskington; Skellingthorpe & Eagle (part); Sleaford Castle; Sleaford Holdingham; Sleaford Navigation; Sleaford Quarrington & Mareham; Sleaford Westholme; Waddington Rural (part); Witham St Hughs & Swinderby.

The areas within the constituency of Sleaford and North Hykeham are under the control and come under the responsibility of Lincolnshire County Council for the provision of certain public services, such as roads and local authority education.

== History ==
=== 1997–2015 ===
Douglas Hogg moved to represent Sleaford and North Hykeham from the previously existing Grantham constituency, a safe Conservative seat, which he had held since 1979. At the 1997 general election, Hogg won 43.9% of the vote, giving him a majority of 5,123 votes (9.6%) ahead of the second-placed Labour Party. At the 2001 general election, the Conservatives increased their vote share by 5.7%, while the Labour Party's vote share decreased; the seat had a majority of 8,622 votes (17.7%), which was the 104th-smallest percentage majority out of the 166 seats won by the Conservatives. At the 2005 general election, Hogg won a majority of 12,705 votes (23.8%); this was the 35th-largest absolute majority (number of votes) and 52nd-largest percentage majority of the 198 seats won by the Conservative Party. UKIP, a minor party, won 5% of the vote in the constituency (coming fourth), retaining its deposit. He stood down at the 2010 general election owing to controversy over his expenses claims, making him the first MP to resign because of the scandal.

Hogg was replaced by fellow Conservative Stephen Phillips. In 2010, he won a majority of 19,905 votes (33.4%); the Liberal Democrats came second. Out of the 650 UK Parliament constituencies contested at the election, Sleaford and North Hykeham had the 14th-largest absolute majority and the 72nd-largest percentage majority. The Lincolnshire Independents, a minor party, won 6.4% of the vote in the seat and came fourth; as this was more than 5%, the party retained its deposit. At the 2015 general election, Phillips won a majority of 24,115 votes (38.9%), with the Labour Party coming second in the seat. This made the constituency the 34th-safest by absolute majority, and the 99th-safest by percentage majority, out of the 650 constituencies.

=== 2016 by-election ===
Phillips stood down as an MP on 4 November 2016, owing to "irreconcilable differences" with the Government over the issue of Brexit. This triggered a by-election within the constituency, which was held on 8 December; Caroline Johnson retained the seat for the Conservatives with a large majority.

=== 2017–present ===
At the 2017 general election, Johnson won a majority of 25,237 votes; this was the second-largest majority of any seat in the East Midlands region (after Leicester South. Johnson's 42,245 votes were the greatest tally for her party in that election. The majority in percentage was surpassed by six candidates of the same party. At the 2019 general election, the Conservatives increased their majority further to 32,565. This was the largest Conservative majority (measured by number of votes) at the election, and the largest majority of any seat in the East Midlands.

The seat was overweight in electorate meaning each elector's potential vote counts for about 15% less than the smallest mainland seats and each potential vote has 24.4% of the potential effect as the remote seat covering Na h-Eileanan an Iar (the Western Isles or Outer Hebrides). A seat consisting of the latter seat multiplied by four times its electorate would, narrowly, be smaller than this seat's adult eligible voters (electorate).

== Members of Parliament ==
Grantham and Lincoln prior to 1997

Election	Member	Party
1997	Douglas Hogg	Conservative
2010	Stephen Phillips	Conservative
2016 by-election	Caroline Johnson	Conservative

== Elections ==
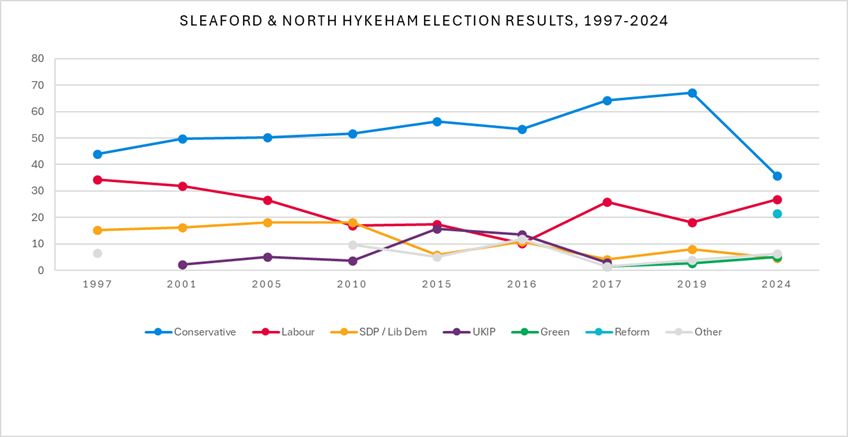
Sleaford and north Hykeham election results 1997–2024

=== Elections in the 2020s ===
General election 2024: Sleaford and North Hykeham
Party	Candidate	Votes	%	±%
Conservative	Caroline Johnson	17,348	35.7	−30.8
Labour	Hanif Khan	13,002	26.8	+8.2
Reform	Ben Jackson	10,484	21.6	New
Lincolnshire Independent	Robert Oates	3,032	6.2	+3.1
Green	Martin Blake	2,435	5.0	+2.6
Liberal Democrats	Matthew Winnington	2,264	4.7	−3.5
Majority		4,346	8.9	−40.0
Turnout		48,565	64.1	−6.1
Registered electors		75,807		
Conservative hold		Swing	−19.5	

=== Elections in the 2010s ===
General election 2019: Sleaford and North Hykeham
Party	Candidate	Votes	%	±%
Conservative	Caroline Johnson	44,683	67.1	+2.9
Labour	Linda Edwards-Shea	12,118	18.2	−7.6
Liberal Democrats	Olly Craven	5,355	8.0	+3.9
Lincolnshire Independent	Marianne Overton	1,999	3.0	New
Green	Simon Tooke	1,742	2.6	+1.1
Independent	Caroline Coram	657	1.0	New
Majority		32,565	48.9	+10.5
Turnout		66,554	70.2	−2.2
Conservative hold		Swing	+5.3	

General election 2017: Sleaford and North Hykeham
Party	Candidate	Votes	%	±%
Conservative	Caroline Johnson	42,245	64.2	+8.0
Labour	Jim Clarke	17,008	25.8	+8.5
Liberal Democrats	Ross Pepper	2,722	4.1	−1.6
UKIP	Sally Chadd	1,954	3.0	−12.7
Green	Fiona McKenna	968	1.5	New
Independent	Paul Coyne	900	1.4	New
Majority		25,237	38.4	−0.5
Turnout		65,797	72.4	+2.2
Conservative hold		Swing	−0.3	

By-election 2016: Sleaford and North Hykeham
Party	Candidate	Votes	%	±%
Conservative	Caroline Johnson	17,570	53.5	−2.7
UKIP	Victoria Ayling	4,426	13.5	−2.2
Liberal Democrats	Ross Pepper	3,606	11.0	+5.3
Labour	Jim Clarke	3,363	10.2	−7.1
Lincolnshire Independent	Marianne Overton	2,892	8.8	+3.6
Independent	Sarah Stock	462	1.4	New
Monster Raving Loony	The Iconic Arty-Pole	200	0.6	New
No description	Paul Coyne	186	0.6	New
No description	Mark Suffield	74	0.2	New
Bus-Pass Elvis	David Bishop	55	0.2	New
Majority		13,144	40.0	+1.1
Turnout		32,893	37.1	−33.1
Conservative hold		Swing	+0.2	

General election 2015: Sleaford and North Hykeham
Party	Candidate	Votes	%	±%
Conservative	Stephen Phillips	34,805	56.2	+4.6
Labour	Jason Pandya-Wood	10,690	17.3	+0.4
UKIP	Steven Hopkins	9,716	15.7	+12.1
Liberal Democrats	Matthew Holden	3,500	5.7	−12.5
Lincolnshire Independent	Marianne Overton	3,233	5.2	−1.2
Majority		24,115	38.9	+5.5
Turnout		61,944	70.2	+0.6
Conservative hold		Swing	+2.1	

General election 2010: Sleaford and North Hykeham
Party	Candidate	Votes	%	±%
Conservative	Stephen Phillips	30,719	51.6	+1.0
Liberal Democrats	David Harding-Price	10,814	18.2	+0.1
Labour	James Normington	10,051	16.9	−9.5
Lincolnshire Independent	Marianne Overton	3,806	6.4	New
UKIP	Roger Doughty	2,163	3.6	−1.3
BNP	Mike Clayton	1,977	3.3	New
Majority		19,905	33.4	+9.6
Turnout		59,530	69.6	+2.8
Conservative hold		Swing	+0.45	

=== Elections in the 2000s ===
General election 2005: Sleaford and North Hykeham
Party	Candidate	Votes	%	±%
Conservative	Douglas Hogg	26,855	50.3	+0.6
Labour	Katrina Bull	14,150	26.5	−5.5
Liberal Democrats	David Harding-Price	9,710	18.2	+2.0
UKIP	Guy Croft	2,682	5.0	+2.8
Majority		12,705	23.8	+6.1
Turnout		53,397	66.8	+1.9
Conservative hold		Swing	+3.05	

General election 2001: Sleaford and North Hykeham
Party	Candidate	Votes	%	±%
Conservative	Douglas Hogg	24,190	49.7	+5.8
Labour	Elizabeth Donnelly	15,568	32.0	−2.3
Liberal Democrats	Robert Arbon	7,894	16.2	+1.0
UKIP	Michael Ward-Barrow	1,067	2.2	New
Majority		8,622	17.7	+8.1
Turnout		48,719	64.9	−9.5
Conservative hold		Swing	+4.0	

=== Elections in the 1990s ===
General election 1997: Sleaford and North Hykeham
Party	Candidate	Votes	%	±%
Conservative	Douglas Hogg	23,358	43.9	
Labour	Sean Hariss	18,235	34.3	
Liberal Democrats	John Marriott	8,063	15.2	
Referendum	Peter Clery	2,942	5.5	
Independent Conservative	Richard Overton	578	1.1	
Majority		5,123	9.6	
Turnout		53,176	74.2	
Conservative win (new seat)				

== See also ==
- List of parliamentary constituencies in Lincolnshire
