= 2016 Sleaford and North Hykeham by-election =

2016 by-election in Lincolnshire, England

- 8 December 2016

Sleaford and North Hykeham constituency
- Turnout: 37.1%
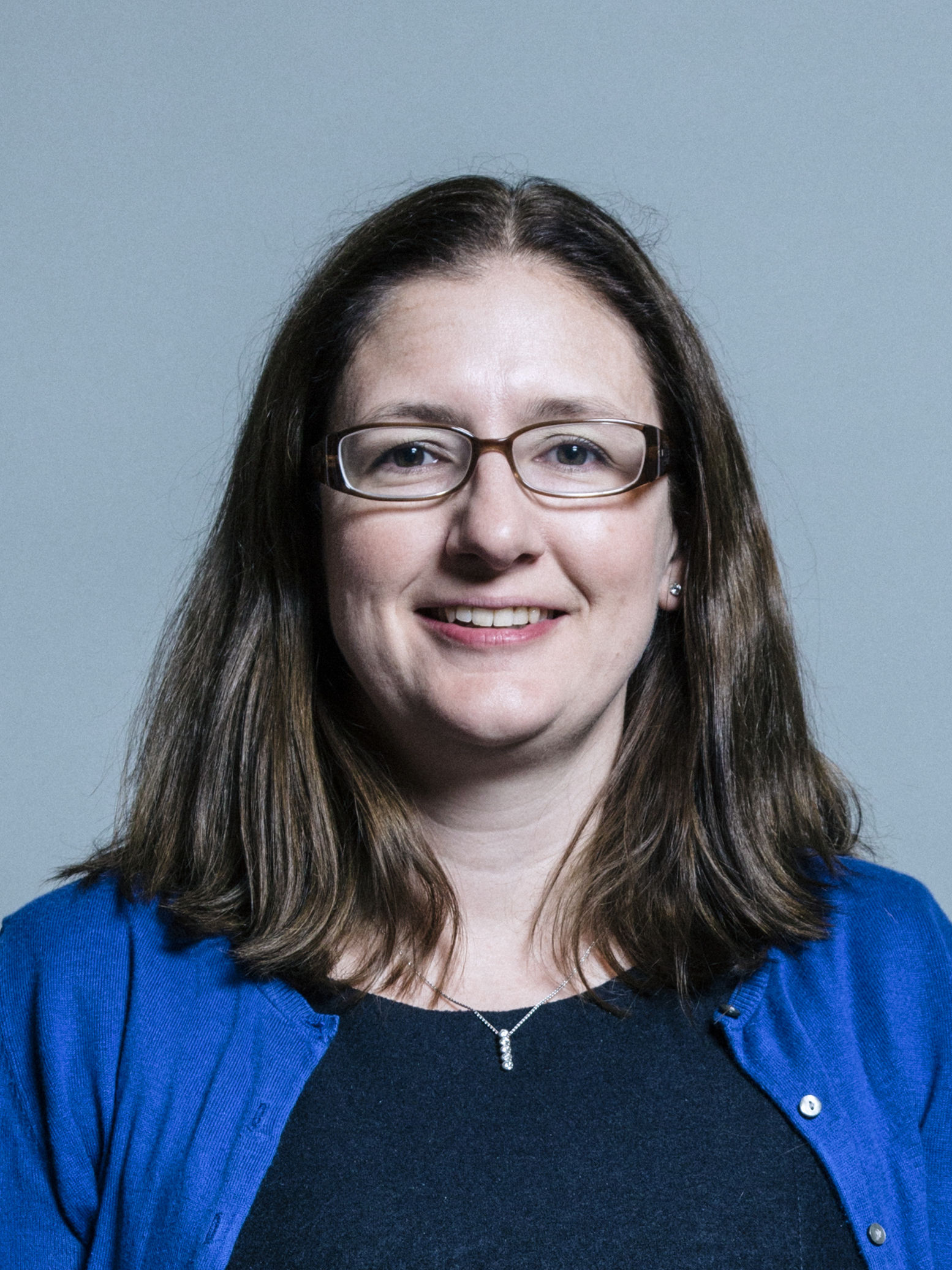

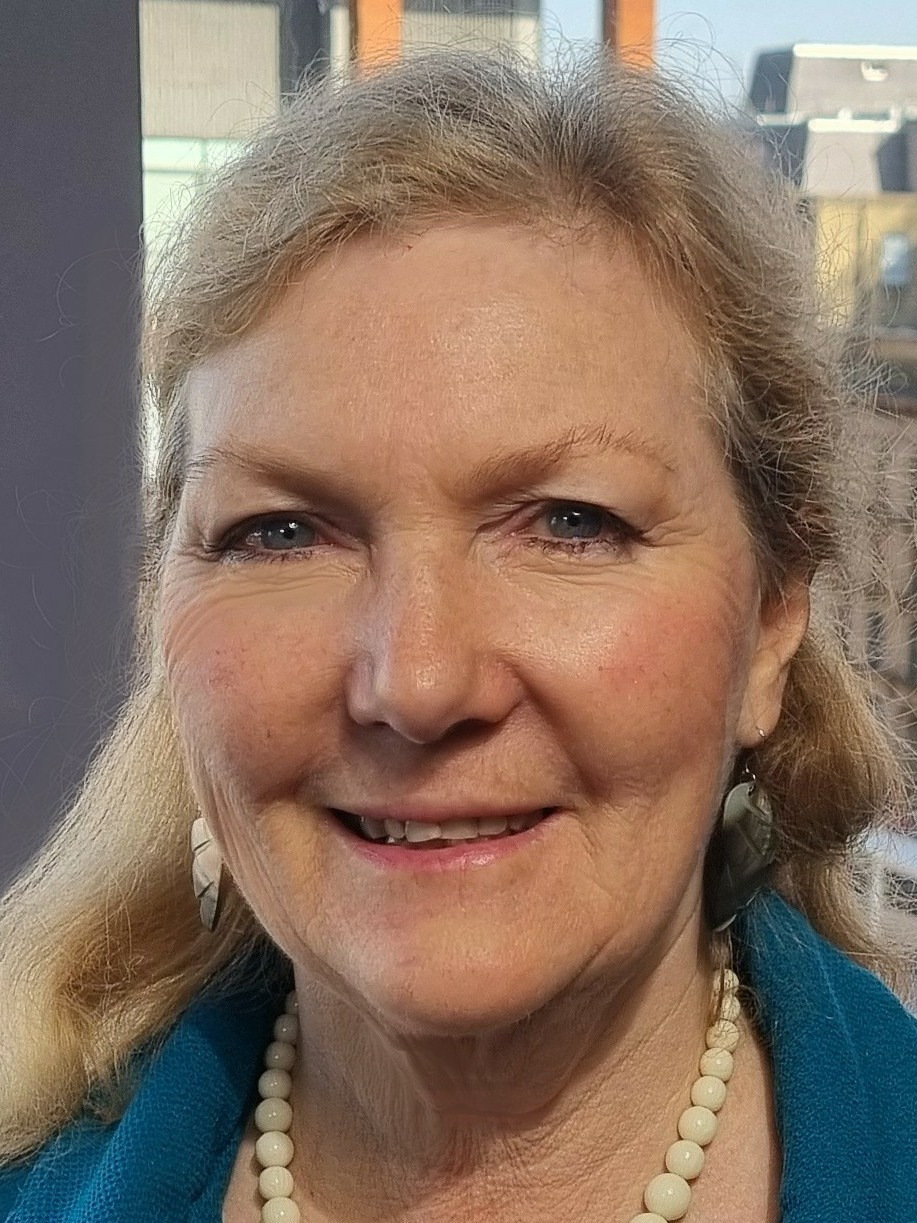
	First party	Second party	Third party
		UKI	Lib
Candidate	Caroline Johnson	Victoria Ayling	Ross Pepper
Party	Conservative	UKIP	Liberal Democrats
Popular vote	17,570	4,426	3,606
Percentage	53.5%	13.5%	11.0%
Swing	▼2.7 pp	▼2.2 pp	▲5.3 pp
	Fourth party	Fifth party
	Lab
Candidate	Jim Clarke	Marianne Overton
Party	Labour	Lincolnshire Independent
Popular vote	3,363	2,892
Percentage	10.2%	8.8%
Swing	▼7.1 pp	▲3.6 pp
MP before election
Stephen Phillips
Conservative
Elected MP
Caroline Johnson
Conservative

A by-election for the United Kingdom parliamentary constituency of Sleaford and North Hykeham was held on 8 December 2016. It was triggered by the resignation of incumbent Conservative Party Member of Parliament (MP) Stephen Phillips, who stood down citing irreconcilable differences with the Conservative government led by the Prime Minister Theresa May over Brexit—the British withdrawal from the European Union (EU). Conservative candidate Caroline Johnson won the by-election, comfortably holding the seat for the party with over half of the vote share.

Phillips had won a large majority of 39 per cent in 2015, with the Labour Party candidate coming second. The constituency had been held by the Conservatives since it was first contested in the 1997 general election and was considered a safe seat for the party. Sleaford and North Hykeham was estimated to have had a vote share of more than 60 per cent in favour of leaving the EU in the 2016 EU membership referendum and Brexit was a key issue in the by-election campaign. Phillips had supported a UK withdrawal from the EU but resigned in opposition to the government's handling of the issue – he felt that Parliament was not being consulted sufficiently.

Ten candidates stood in the by-election. The Eurosceptic UK Independence Party (UKIP) came second with 13 per cent of the vote, followed by the Liberal Democrats with 11 per cent of the vote and Labour on 10 per cent. The by-election result was widely seen as poor for the Labour Party, whose vote share decreased by 7 per cent.

== Background ==
=== Constituency ===
Location of Sleaford and North Hykeham within the parts of Lincolnshire that are within the Lincolnshire County Council area

Location of Lincolnshire within England (the Lincolnshire County Council area is in bright red)

The UK Parliament constituency of Sleaford and North Hykeham is located in Lincolnshire, which is in the East Midlands region of England. The constituency covers a large area of the county south-west of Lindsey and consists of most of the district of North Kesteven as well as several wards of the district of South Kesteven. Sleaford and North Hykeham is a county constituency, which means it is partly rural. In 2016, 75.2 per cent of adults in the constituency aged 16 to 64 were in employment, which was higher than both the regional and national averages. The most important industries in the area are wholesale and retail trade, manufacturing, and human health and social work. The average gross weekly pay for full-time workers in 2016 was £437, less than the regional average of £483 and the British average of £540.

The constituency was first contested in the 1997 general election, when it was created as part of the fourth periodic review of Westminster constituencies. Like all UK Parliament constituencies, it elects one member of parliament (MP) to the House of Commons using the first-past-the-post voting system. Sleaford and North Hykeham has only elected Conservative MPs since its creation. Stephen Phillips was first elected in the 2010 general election and was re-elected in 2015 with a large majority of over 24,000 votes, making the constituency a safe seat for the Conservative Party. Phillips won a majority of 38.9 per cent, followed by the Labour Party in second and the anti-European Union UK Independence Party (UKIP) in third. The Liberal Democrat candidate came fourth, while Marianne Overton of the Lincolnshire Independents came fifth and last with 5.2 per cent of the vote. Overton was the only 2015 candidate to stand in the 2016 by-election.

==== Previous election results ====
Graph of election results in Sleaford and North Hykeham, from 1997 to 2015 (some minor parties are omitted) View source data.

General election 2015: Sleaford and North Hykeham
Party	Candidate	Votes	%	±%
Conservative	Stephen Phillips	34,805	56.2	+4.6
Labour	Jason Pandya-Wood	10,690	17.3	+0.4
UKIP	Steven Hopkins	9,716	15.7	+12.1
Liberal Democrats	Matthew Holden	3,500	5.7	−12.5
Lincolnshire Independent	Marianne Overton	3,233	5.2	−1.2
Majority		24,115	38.9	+5.5
Turnout		61,944	70.2	+0.6
Conservative hold		Swing	+2.1	

=== 2015 general election and Brexit ===
At the general election on 7 May 2015, the Conservative Party won a narrow majority in the House of Commons, securing 331 of the 650 total seats, and the party's leader, David Cameron, remained prime minister, a position he had held since 2010 as part of a coalition government with the Liberal Democrats. Labour came second with 232 seats, while the Liberal Democrats won 8 seats and UKIP 1; no other party that stood in the by-election won any seats. Due to the first-past-the-post electoral system used in British general elections, UKIP won fewer seats than the Liberal Democrats despite winning a higher vote share nationally.

A referendum was held on 23 June 2016 on whether the UK should leave the European Union (EU). As of the day before the referendum, 185 Conservative MPs declared they would vote to remain and 138 declared they would vote to leave. Phillips supported a withdrawal from the EU. The Labour Party and the Liberal Democrats officially supported the continuation of EU membership. UKIP supported the UK's withdrawal from the EU, which was the party's main policy. The UK voted to leave the EU, with approximately 52 per cent of votes cast in favour of withdrawal from the EU. The UK did not leave immediately; the referendum result led to a period of negotiations between the UK and the EU. The Conservative Party was officially neutral in the referendum, although Cameron campaigned to remain. Immediately after the referendum result was announced, Cameron resigned as prime minister. He was replaced in July 2016 as Conservative leader and as prime minister by Theresa May.

The result of the EU referendum in Sleaford and North Hykeham is not known because the results were totalled and announced in counting areas rather than in constituencies. The researcher Chris Hanretty published estimates of the referendum results from each constituency, and calculated that voters in Sleaford and North Hykeham voted 61.6 per cent in favour of leaving the EU. Based on these estimates, the constituency had the 125th-highest vote-share for withdrawal out of the 650 UK Parliamentary constituencies.

=== Resignation of Stephen Phillips ===
On 3 November 2016, the High Court had ruled the UK could not invoke Article 50 to begin the process of leaving the EU without a parliamentary vote. The government appealed the ruling, but the Supreme Court upheld the High Court's decision in January 2017. The day after the High Court ruling, Phillips resigned his parliamentary seat over the issue, citing policy differences and criticising the Conservative government under May for failing to consult Parliament sufficiently over Brexit. Phillips had been critical of May's approach, calling for MPs to have a more decisive role in the Brexit negotiations, and had previously called for an urgent debate on the issue. In the appeal, the Supreme Court later ruled against the government.

In his resignation letter to his local Conservative Association, Phillips said; "The referendum result gives the government no authority or mandate to adopt a negotiating position without reference to the wishes of the House and those of the British people expressed through their elected representatives". He set out three policy areas in which he disagreed with the Government:

- "its failure to appreciate the constitutional necessity of properly consulting Parliament" on leaving the EU;
- "the continued shirking of our responsibility for unaccompanied child refugees who have been forced to flee war and conflict"; and
- "the way in which international aid is now apparently to be used other than to assist some of the world's poorest and most vulnerable people".

He concluded by saying "It has become clear to me over the last few months that my growing and very significant policy differences with the current government mean that I am unable properly to represent the people who elected me". The Daily Telegraph reported that some Conservative MPs said that Phillips, who is a lawyer, may have been motivated by disappointment over not being promoted to Attorney General.

The resignation was met with surprise among local councillors and some other Conservative MPs. It came less than two weeks after the Conservative MP Zac Goldsmith resigned in protest against the government's decision to support the expansion of Heathrow Airport. Phillips's resignation triggered a by-election in the constituency, the date of which was set on 7 November for 8 December.

== Candidates and campaign ==
=== Candidates ===
The Conservative campaign started on 5 November (the day after the resignation) with a candidate to be chosen on 10 November. Caroline Johnson, a consultant paediatrician who lives near Sleaford, was selected by members of the Sleaford and North Hykeham Conservative Association following a hustings (a campaign event where candidates give speeches). She defeated two other finalists, local councillor Lindsay Cawrey and the Conservative Party's regional chairman Kelly Smith; the Lincolnshire County Councillor Richard Davies had also expressed interest in being the party's candidate. Johnson had stood in Scunthorpe at the 2010 general election, coming second to the Labour candidate. After her selection, Johnson said; "I am completely behind the Government's plans for Brexit and to deliver on the decision made by the British people".

At least three individuals put themselves forward to be UKIP's candidate: the Lincolnshire County Councillors Robin Hunter-Clarke and Victoria Ayling, and Suzanne Evans – a candidate in the party's leadership election. Hunter-Clarke and Evans withdrew from the contest on 10 November, the latter because she would not have been able to stay in the party leadership contest if she had been selected. Ayling was selected on 13 November. She had stood for UKIP in the 2016 Lincolnshire Police and Crime Commissioner election and in the Great Grimsby constituency in 2015, and previously in Great Grimsby in 2010 as the Conservative candidate. In 2013, Ayling was criticised after saying "I just want to send the lot back" in a video about immigration, and these remarks were brought up during the by-election campaign; she said that she had been referring to the deportation of illegal immigrants and that her words had been taken out of context.

The Labour Party selected Jim Clarke, a trade unionist, refuse collector and former postman. The Liberal Democrats selected Ross Pepper, who worked for an optician, on 11 November; he had stood in Lincoln in the 2015 general election, coming third. Marianne Overton, leader of the Lincolnshire Independents, was her party's candidate. Sarah Stock, a National Health Service (NHS) campaigner and former nurse, was an independent candidate with a "Save the NHS" platform. The Green Party declared it would not be fielding a candidate and instead supported Stock.

The other candidates were Peter Hill, appearing on the ballot paper under the name of The Iconic Arty-Pole for the satirical Official Monster Raving Loony Party; David Bishop of the Church of the Militant Elvis Party; (Note: Also called the Bus Pass Elvis Party) Mark Suffield, a North Kesteven district councillor; and Paul Coyne, a Sleaford Town Councillor: the latter two appeared on the ballot paper with no stated party affiliation. In total, ten candidates stood in the by-election.

=== Campaign ===
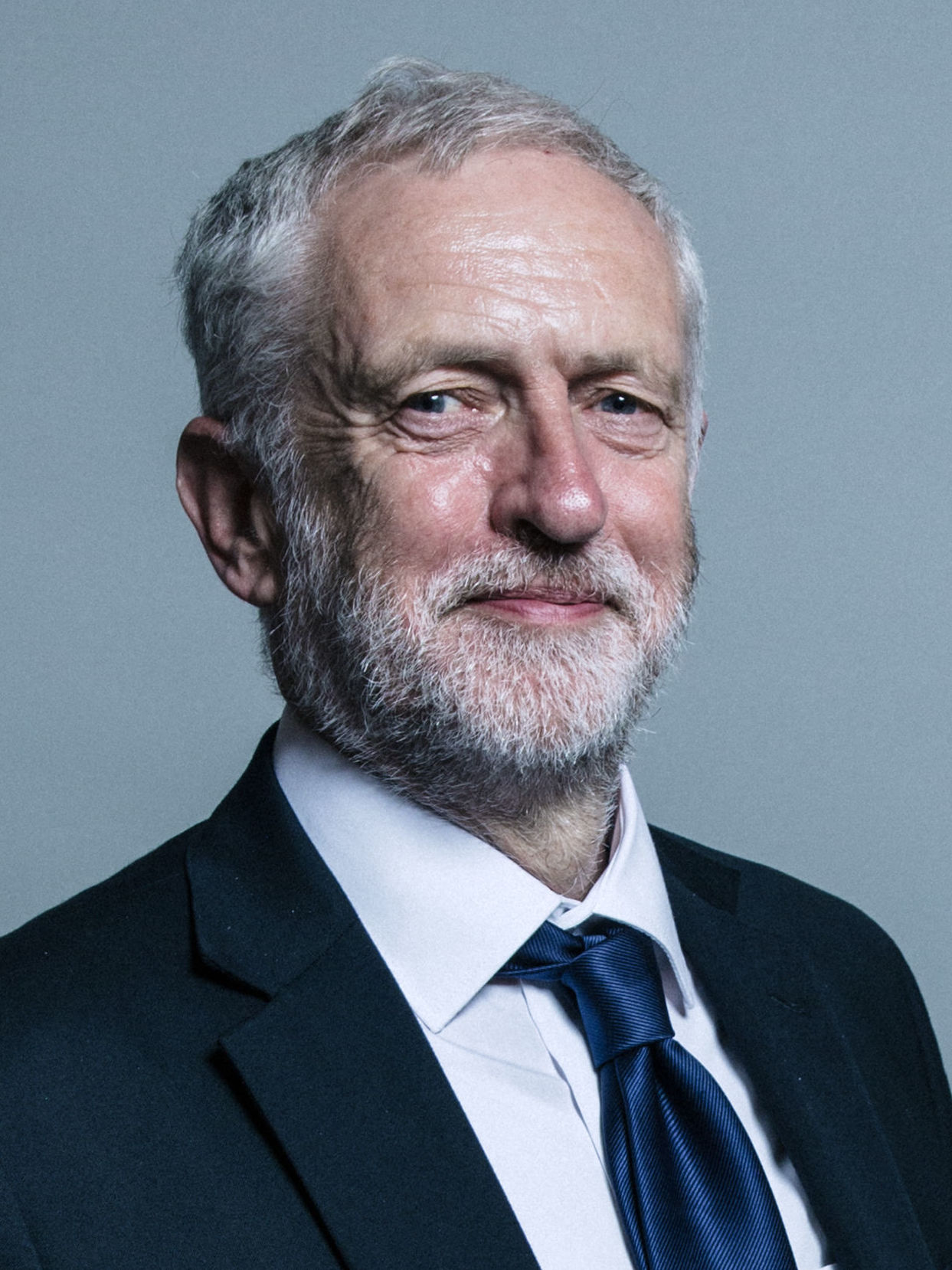
Jeremy Corbyn, the leader of the Labour Party at the time, visited the constituency during the campaign.

The current and former leaders of UKIP (Paul Nuttall and Nigel Farage) and the leaders of the Labour Party (Jeremy Corbyn) and the Liberal Democrats (Tim Farron) all visited the constituency during the campaign. Brexit was the main issue in the by-election. UKIP campaigned actively in the by-election despite the Conservative Party's large majority. UKIP hoped to perform strongly in the by-election due to the high level of support in the constituency for the leaving of the EU – Farage said "people here voted for Brexit and this is about getting the right deal, which you won't get if people vote Conservative". On 5 December, Farage campaigned in front of a poster on which "Hykeham" was misspelt as "Hykenham", which The Guardian speculated could hurt his party's chances in the election. Ayling criticised Theresa May and the Conservatives for not proceeding quickly enough with Brexit.

Jim Clarke, the Labour candidate, opposed Brexit during the referendum campaign but said he would now support it because of the referendum's result. Clarke argued the NHS was the main issue in the by-election, saying many voters had mentioned it to him. Clarke campaigned against the closure of an accident and emergency (A&E) unit in the area. The Liberal Democrat candidate, Ross Pepper, focused on gaining the votes of constituents who had voted to remain in the EU in the referendum.

In the Richmond Park by-election that was held one week before the Sleaford vote, the Liberal Democrats won the seat from the former Conservative MP Zac Goldsmith in a substantial swing (Goldsmith stood as an independent, but the Conservatives did not stand a candidate against him). The result was seen as a sign of opposition to Brexit because the constituents of Richmond Park voted to remain in the EU. The Conservatives were expected by journalists to win the Sleaford and North Hykeham by-election; in an opinion piece in The Guardian on 4 December, the journalist Andrew Rawnsley argued that whether UKIP would overtake Labour was the most important question in the by-election, and speculated whether this could indicate a realignment of British politics based on views on Brexit instead of the traditional left–right political spectrum.

The main candidates are fighting a battle to appear the most anti-EU, with UKIP leaflets relentlessly painting the Tories as "Brexit backsliders" and Labour's candidate keen to highlight his willingness to trigger Article 50 despite having voted to remain. Only the Lib Dem candidate is concentrating on the 40% of voters in the constituency who backed remain last June.

— Rowena Mason, The Guardian (2016)

== Result and analysis ==
Sleaford and North Hykeham by-election, 8 December 2016
Party	Candidate	Votes	%	±%
Conservative	Caroline Johnson	17,570	53.5	−2.7
UKIP	Victoria Ayling	4,426	13.5	−2.2
Liberal Democrats	Ross Pepper	3,606	11.0	+5.3
Labour	Jim Clarke	3,363	10.2	−7.1
Lincolnshire Independent	Marianne Overton	2,892	8.8	+3.6
Independent	Sarah Stock	462	1.4	N/A
Monster Raving Loony	The Iconic Arty-Pole (Note: Real name Peter Hill)	200	0.6	N/A
No description	Paul Coyne	186	0.6	N/A
No description	Mark Suffield	74	0.2	N/A
Church of the Militant Elvis	David Bishop	55	0.2	N/A
Majority		13,144	40.0	+1.1
Turnout		32,893	37.1	−33.1
Conservative hold		Swing	−0.3	

The election took place on 8 December 2016. The Conservatives received more than half of the votes cast and won a large majority of 40 per cent and over 10,000 votes, described by Stephen Bush in the New Statesman as "one of the party's all-time best by-election performances while in government". Turnout in the by-election fell to 37.1 per cent, which was described by The Guardian as "remarkably low even for a by-election", compared to just over 70 per cent at the 2015 general election. A 2019 article in a Scottish newspaper, the Irvine Times, discussed whether the low turnout was due to the time of year, and concluded that the fact that the fact that the election was in winter did not seem to have a large effect; the race not being close was also a factor (the Richmond Park by-election at the same time of year had a turnout of over 50 per cent).

The result was widely seen as poor for the Labour Party, whose vote share decreased by 7 per cent; the party came fourth, having been in second place in the 2015 general election. An article in The Guardian described the party as "pushed into irrelevance" at the by-election. Commentators blamed the party's stance on Brexit, which tried to appeal to voters on both sides of the Brexit debate – the party supported leaving the EU but called for free movement of people with the bloc. The leadership of Jeremy Corbyn was also cited as a reason for the poor performance, including by Jess Phillips – the Labour MP for Birmingham Yardley. David Winnick, the Labour MP for Walsall North, called the result "humiliating" and said it could foreshadow an "electoral disaster" for the party. Vernon Coaker, Labour MP for Gedling, said that the result was disappointing, and blamed the focus on Brexit instead of on issues like the NHS. The result was considered good for the Liberal Democrats, whose share of the vote increased. Tim Farron, the party's leader, said the result showed his party was the real opposition to the Conservatives. UKIP's performance was also seen in some quarters as poor, even though they beat both Labour and the Liberal Democrats, as their vote-share declined in comparison with the 2015 general election results.

== Aftermath ==
Graph of election results in Sleaford and North Hykeham, from 2015 to 2019 (minor parties that never received more than 5 per cent of the vote are omitted); note that the Lincolnshire Independents did not stand in the constituency in the 2017 general election, and UKIP did not stand in the constituency in the 2019 general election. View source data.

Johnson retained her seat at the 2017 general election, winning a large majority of more than 25,000 votes over the Labour Party candidate, who came second. She voted in favour of May's Brexit deal on all three occasions when it was voted on in Parliament, though it was rejected in all three votes. After May announced in May 2019 that she would resign as prime minister, Caroline Johnson supported Boris Johnson in the Conservative Party leadership election to be May's replacement, arguing that he was the best politician to deliver Brexit. Boris Johnson won the leadership election in July.

At the 2019 general election, Caroline Johnson increased her majority over Labour further. After the 2019 election, the Conservative majority in the seat was 32,565 votes, which was the largest majority in terms of number of votes of any seat won by the party in the election. Caroline Johnson voted in favour of Boris Johnson's revised Brexit deal in December 2020, which was approved by Parliament, and the United Kingdom left the European Union on 31 January 2020.

== See also ==
- List of United Kingdom by-elections (2010–present)
