= Branston Community Academy =

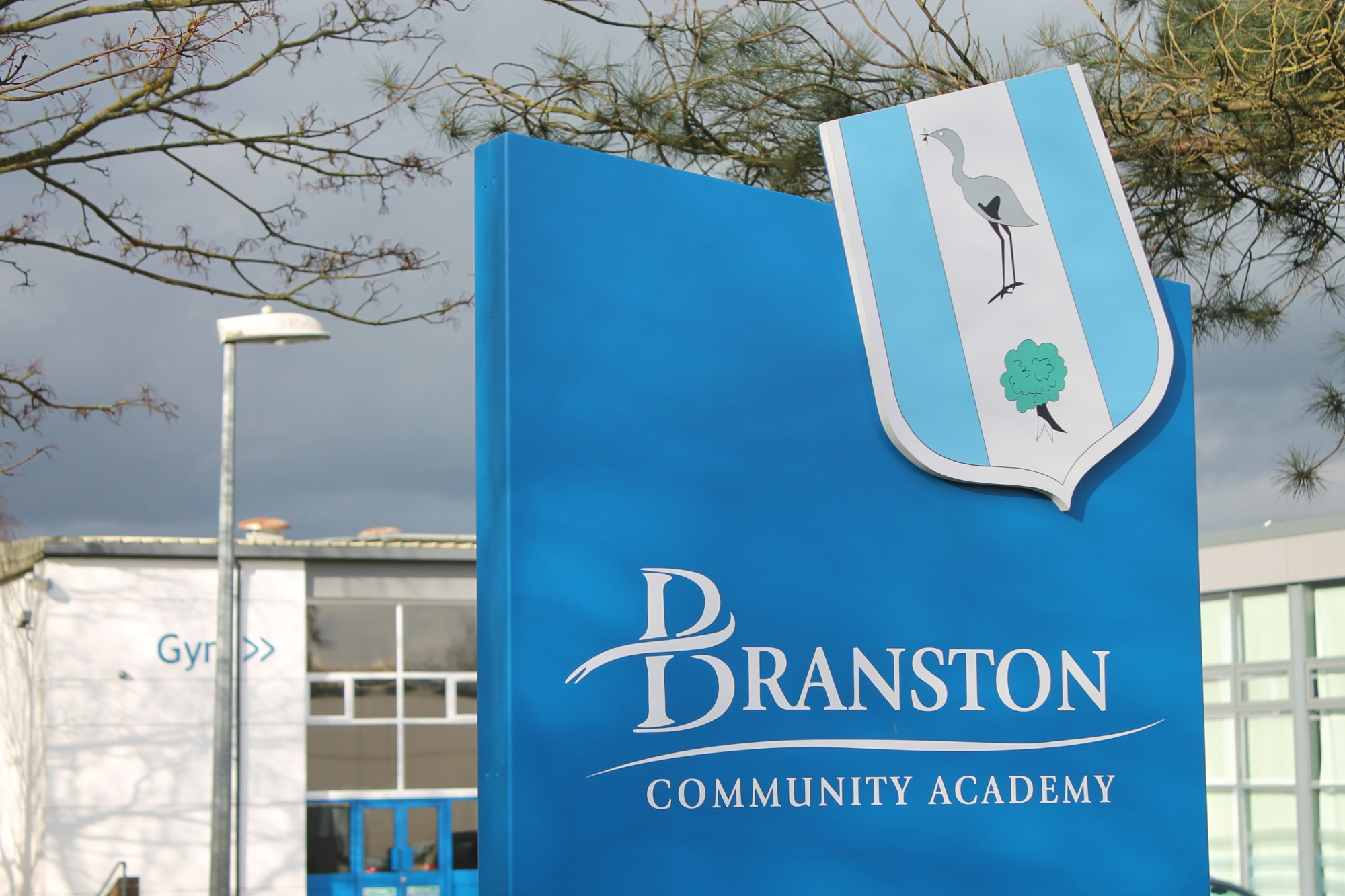

Location
- Station Road; Branston, Lincolnshire, LN4 1LH; England; 53.19861°N 0.46639°W >

Information
- Type: Academy
- Established: 2010
- Department for Education URN: 136358 Tables
- Ofsted: Reports
- Chairman: M. Norman
- Principal: James Carter
- Gender: Mixed
- Age: 11 to 18
- Colours: navy and silver
- Website: Official website

Branston Community Academy, (formerly Branston School and Community College) is a secondary school for 11- to 18-year-old students on Station Road in Branston, Lincolnshire, England.

== History ==
=== Secondary modern school ===
Building started in 1955, and it was partly opened in January 1957 as Branston County Secondary Modern. It was built by Bosworth & Wakeford of South Parade, Grantham. It was officially opened by the Earl of Ancaster, the Lord Lieutenant, on Friday 5 July 1957.

By 1959 around 350 pupils were enrolled. The name was shortened to Branston County Secondary School in 1968, and to Branston School in 1970. The headteacher was Mr L Kellett, the school was nine acres and cost £99,133, the furniture cost £11,300.

=== Comprehensive ===
The name was changed to Branston School and Community College in 1972, and later shortened to Branston Community College.

The original school consisted of a Main block of classrooms (Current maths block), as well as other areas including a dining hall on the ground floor, a gymnasium, sports changing rooms, and a stage (Concert hall). Woodwork and metalwork workshops (Current Design technology block) were built nearby. The school greenhouses and changing rooms were at the back of the site. The school for many years ran a house system based on royal houses, with allocated colours: Tudor (yellow), Lancaster (red), Windsor (green), Stuart (blue), York (white) and Hanover (orange). This system has since ended and been replaced by a house system now rarely used, only used for sporting events: Titans, Trojans, Spartans. House rooms have also since been turned into year rooms to provide students with an indoor area at break and lunchtimes. However, in 2022 the House System was phased out at the same time that they stopped Sports Day.

Classroom space expanded through increased pupil numbers over the years and A new library and office accommodation block (current admin and computing block), and sports complex including a sportshall and pe offices with a youth wing above (Current herons gym) were built (1970). The sixth form unit (1960-70s). Science, languages and Humanities block (1970-80s). swimming pool and music block (1980). Business and enterprise block & hairdressing block (now "New English block") (2000s). Another business and enterprise building (Used as the religious studies block) (2018)

=== Business and Enterprise College ===
Branston has previously held Business and Enterprise Specialist status and was one of the first 18 British schools designated as a Specialist Business and Enterprise College in September 2002. In 2003 the school became a DCSF Pathfinder Enterprise School, and in 2006 it was designated as the regional hub school for Enterprise. In 2005 the College set up a four-year partnership with Lincolnshire Cooperative and it has also been asked by the Specialist Schools Trust to take part in the research project, Capturing Transformation.

== Today ==
In December 2010 the school changed its name from Branston Community College to Branston Community Academy.

A permanent fence was placed around the site in October 2025.

The Community Library has since been altered, along with the location of the schools reception (which is now in the previous community lounge / gallery) to allow members of the public to be able to use the library, as well as allowing students who arrive late to be able to gain access to the site without compromising the security of the site.

In late 2025 and early 2026, additional security infrastructure was installed, including electromagnetic lock doors.

Branston community academy is still developing its site from a 1950s secondary modern, and still has a vast amount of traditional mid century features and details which puts towards an unyielding feel about the site, especially felt in the original buildings.

Some of these features mentioned are traditional parquet and herringbone flooring, spotlite glass inserts, original orange veneered doors, and other architectural features of a mid century style. The schools original buildings feature basements and tunnels between, understage storage and office access doors found in certain classroom cupboards.
