= List of bridges and viaducts in Lincolnshire =

This is a list of all the bridges and viaducts in the ceremonial county of Lincolnshire, England.

Bridges are listed under their current use or traffic. For example, Torksey Viaduct is listed under 'Highway' as it is now used by foot and cycle traffic, and not under 'Railway' as it used to be. However, if the bridge or viaduct has not been re-purposed yet it listed in the section of its original use.

== Railway bridges ==
Name	Crosses	Locality	Length (m)	Longest Span (m)	Date	Type	Grade	Notes	Image
Barkston East Junction Railway Bridge	River Witham	Barkston						Carries Grantham to Sleaford Line (Poacher Line).	
Barkston Junction Bridge	Grantham to Sleaford Line (Poacher Line).	Barkston				Steel Beam		Carries East Coast Main Line. Bridge No7a	
Barkston North Junction Railway Bridge	River Witham	Marston						Carries East Coast Main Line	
Brigg Railway Bridge	New River Ancholme	Brigg						Carries Gainsborough to Grimsby railway.	
Cadney Road Railway Bridge	Old River Ancholme, Cadney Road	Brigg				Iron Box Girder		Carries Gainsborough to Grimsby railway.	
Claypole Railway Bridge	River Witham	Claypole						Carries the East Coast Main Line.	
Coningsby Railway Bridge 1	Hunter's Lane (Unclassified road)	Coningsby			1913			Carried the Kirkstead and Little Steeping Railway. Now partially dismantled.	
Coningsby Railway Bridge 2	River Bain	Coningsby			1913	Brick Arch		Carried the Kirkstead and Little Steeping Railway.	
Coningsby Railway Bridge 3	A153 Tumby Road	Coningsby			1913			Carried the Kirkstead and Little Steeping Railway. Now dismantled.	
Cow Bridge Drain Railway Bridge	Cow Bridge Drain	Cowbridge, Boston						Carries the Poacher Line (Nottingham to Skegness)	
East Holmes Bridge	River Witham	Lincoln				Brick Arch		Carries the Newark to Lincoln Line.	
Grand Sluice Railway Bridge	River Witham	Boston			1885	Iron Truss Bridge	II	Designed by Richard Johnson. Originally double track but now single. Carries the Poacher Line.	
Keadby Bridge	River Trent	Althorpe	167	46	1916	Rolling lift	II	Also known as the King George V Bridge. Combined road and rail bridge.	
Maud Foster Railway Bridge	Maud Foster Drain	Boston	30	30	1922	Iron Box Girder		Carries the Poacher Line (Nottingham to Skegness)	
Saxilby Rail Bridge	Foss Dyke	Saxilby				Iron Beam		Carries Lincoln to Gainsborough Line	
Spalding East Railway Bridge	Coronation Channel (River Welland)	Spalding				Iron Beam		Disused.	
Spittlegate Railway Bridge	River Witham	Spittlegate						Carries the East Coast Main Line.	
Stamp End Bridge	River Witham	Lincoln		20	1848/1903	Iron Box Girder	II	Oldest Iron Box Girder Bridge in Britain and possibly the World. Partially reconstructed in 1903.	
Swing Bridge (Boston Docks)	River Witham	Boston			1884	Iron Swing Bridge	II	Carries a branch into Boston Docks.	
Trent Junction Railway Bridge	River Trent	Gainsborough	138					Carries the Sheffield to Lincoln Line.	
Vazon Sliding Railway Bridge	Stainforth and Keadby Canal	Keadby				Sliding Bridge			
Worlaby Railway Bridge	River Ancholme	Worlaby				Iron Box Girder		Carries the Scunthorpe to Grimsby Line.	

== Highway bridges ==
=== A ===
Name	Crosses	Locality	Length (m)	Longest Span (m)	Date	Type	Grade	Notes	Image
Agnes Street Footbridge	River Witham	Grantham						Public footpath.	
Aswardby Bridge	River Lymn	Aswardby							
Aubourne Bridge 1	River Witham	Aubourn				Steel truss		Public bridleway. Deemed unsafe by Lincolnshire County Council with users advised to use the next bridge upstream.	
Aubourne Bridge 2	River Witham	Aubourn				Concrete beam		Public footpath	
Aubourne Fen Bridge	River Brant	Aubourn						Carries farm track. No public access.	
Aubourne Weir Footbridge	River Brant	Aubourn				Concrete beam		Public footpath. Part of the weir infrastructure. Also known as Mill Weir and Haddington Weir.	

=== B ===
Name	Crosses	Locality	Length (m)	Longest Span (m)	Date	Type	Grade	Notes	Image
Bardney Bridge	River Witham	Bardney	30	30	1894	Iron Truss		Built by Sherwin Reynolds & Son of Boston. Carries B1190. Single track.	
Bardney Lock Bridge	River Witham	Bardney and Branston Island	78			Iron Box Girder		Carries the Water Rail Way, part of the National Cycle Network (Route 1) managed by Sustrans. It used to carry the Lincolnshire Loop Line (Boston to Lincoln).	
Bargate Sluice Footbridge 1	River Witham	Boultham, Lincoln				Concrete Beam		Public Footpath.	
Bargate Sluice Footbridge 2	Sincil Dike	Boultham, Lincoln				Steel Arch		Public Footpath.	
Bargate Sluice Footbridge 3	Sincil Dike	Boultham, Lincoln				Steel Arch		Public Footpath. Also known as Webb Street Footbridge.	
Barkston Bridge	River Witham	Barkston				Brick Arch		Carries Station Road (minor road) between Barkston and Marston.	
Barkston Pipe Bridge	River Witham	Barkston						Pipe Bridge	
Barnby Bridge 1	River Witham	Barnby in the Willows						Carries farm track. Public footpath.	
Barnby Bridge 2	River Witham	Barnby in the Willows						Carries farm track. Public footpath.	
Footbridge	River Witham	Barnby in the Willows						Public footpath	
Bassingham Fen Bridge	River Brant	Bassingham						Carries farm track. No public access.	
Beckingham Bridge 1	River Witham	Beckingham						Carries farm track. No public access.	
Beckingham Bridge 2	River Witham	Beckingham						Carries farm track. No public access.	
Belton Bridge 1	River Witham	Belton						Carries Belton Bypass A607.	
Belton Bridge 2	River Witham	Belton			1903	Stone Arch	II	Carries Main Road (minor road) through Belton.	
Belton Footbridge 1	River Witham	Belton						Part of the Belton House Estate.	
Belton Footbridge 2	River Witham (former course)	Belton						Part of the Belton House Estate.	
Belton Footbridge 3	River Witham	Belton				Timber Beam		Part of the Belton House Estate.	
Belton Footbridge 4	River Witham (former course)	Belton				Timber Beam		Part of the Belton House Estate.	
Birdhouse Clough Pipe Bridge	River Ancholme	Worlaby				Steel Truss		Carries pipelines.	
Bishop Bridge	River Ancholme	Bishopbridge						Carries A631. Confluence of the Rivers Ancholme and Rase, and the beginning of the New River Ancholme drainage channel.	
Bishopbridge Weir Footbridge	River Ancholme	Bishopbridge				Iron Truss		No public Access. Part of the weir infrastructure. Point at which the Ancholme ceases to be navigable.	
Black Dike Bridge	Black Dike	Waddingham				Brick Arch		Carries B1205.	
Black Dike Footbridge	Black Dike	Waddingham				Steel Arch		Public Footpath.	
Black Sluice Pumping Station	South Forty Foot Drain	Boston			1946			The road bridge is part of the sluice infrastructure.	
Blackmoor Bridge	River Brant	Aubourn						Carries Blackmoor Road (minor road) between Harmston and Aubourn.	
Blackmoor Farm Bridge	River Witham	Aubourn						Carries farm track. No public access.	
Boultham Avenue Bridge	River Witham	Lincoln				Concrete Beam		Carries Boultham Avenue (minor road).	
Brace Bridge	River Witham	Bracebridge, Lincoln			1927	Stone Arch		Carries A1434. Site of ancient crossing of the Roman Fosse Way of the River Witham.	
Brandon Bridge 1	River Brant	Brandon						Carries farm track. Public footpath.	
Brandon Bridge 2	River Brant	Brandon						Carries farm track	
Brandon Bridge 3	River Brant	Brandon						Carries Hough Road (minor road) between Brandon and Hough on the Hill.	
Brandon Bridge 4	River Brant	Brandon						Carries Grange Road (minor road) between Brandon and Hough on the Hill.	
Brandy Wharf Bridge	New River Ancholme	Waddingham				Iron Arch		Carries B1205.	
Brant Broughton Bridge	River Brant	Brant Broughton				Concrete beam		Carries minor rod between Brant Broughton and Welbourn.	
Brayford Flyover	Fossdyke Navigation	Lincoln	152		1996	Steel Beam		Carries B1273.	
Brayford Wharf East Footbridge 1	River Witham	Lincoln				Steel Arch		Disused	
Brayford Wharf East Footbridge 2	River Witham	Lincoln				Concrete Beam		Provides access to the University of Lincoln.	
Bridge End Road Bridge	River Witham	Grantham						Carries Bridge End Road (A52).	
Bridgewater House Footbridge 1	River Witham	Belton						No public access.	
Bridgewater House Footbridge 2	River Witham	Belton						No public access.	
Brigg Pipe Bridge	River Ancholme	Brigg						Carries pipeline.	
Broughton Bridge	River Ancholme	Broughton			19th century	Iron Inverted Suspension	II	Carries farm track. Public Footpath.	
Brown's Bridge	River Ancholme	Snitterby			19th century	Iron Arch		Carries farm track. No public access.	
Bycroft's Bridge	River Lymn	Wainfleet Bank						Carries Brewster Lane (minor road) between Wainfleet Bank and Wainfleet All Saints.	

=== C ===
Name	Crosses	Locality	Length (m)	Longest Span (m)	Date	Type	Grade	Notes	Image
Cadney Bridge	River Ancholme	Cadney			1882	Iron Arch	II	Carries farm track. Public Footpath. Designed by Alfred Atkinson.	
Caistor Canal Lock 1 Bridge	Caistor Canal	South Kelsey			1795	Steel Arch	II	Public Footpath. Listing due to abutments not the span itself.	
Carlton Lowfield Footbridge	River Brant	Carlton-le-Moorland				Steel Beam		Public footpath	
Castlethorpe Bridge	River Ancholme	Castlethorpe				Iron Truss		Carries farm track. Public Footpath.	
Castlethorpe Pipe Bridge	River Ancholme	Castlethorpe				Steel Truss		Carries pipeline.	
Caythorpe Low Fields Bridge 1	River Brant	Caythorpe						Carries farm track. No public access.	
Caythorpe Low Fields Bridge 2	River Brant	Caythorpe						Carries Gorse Hill Lane (minor road) between Brandon and Caythorpe.	
Caythorpe Low Fields Bridge 2	River Brant	Brandon						Carries farm track. No public access.	
Chain Bridge (new)	River Lymn	Wainfleet All Saints				Concrete Beam		Carries A52.	
Chain Bridge (old)	River Lymn	Wainfleet All Saints				Iron Beam		No public access. Carries farm track; it was a minor road before the New Chain Bridge (A52 Wainfleet Bypass) was built.	
Childers North Drove	Coronation Channel (River Welland)	Spalding				Concrete Beam		Carries farm track. Public bridleway.	
Childers South Drove	Coronation Channel (River Welland)	Spalding						Carries farm track. Public bridleway.	
Church Bridge	River Witham	Bassingham				Concrete Beam		Public footpath	
City Square Bridge	River Witham	Lincoln				Steel Arch		Footbridge connecting City Square and the Waterside Shopping Centre.	
Claypole Bridge	River Witham	Claypole				Brick Arch		Carries Shire Lane (minor road) between Balderton and Claypole.	
Claypole Footbridge	River Witham	Claypole				Steel Beam		Public footpath	
Clough Bridge	River Lymn	Firsby						Carries minor road between Thorpe Fendykes and Firsby.	
Clough Bridge	River Lymn	Wainfleet Clough						No public access. Carries farm track.	
College Street Footbridge	River Witham	Grantham						Public footpath.	
Corporation Bridge	Alexandra Dock	Grimsby	150		1925	Bascule		Designed by Charles Sacre. Replaced an earlier bridge from 1872.	
County Bridge	Old River Ancholme	Brigg			1828	Stone Arch	II	Also known as Old Town Bridge.	
Cow Bridge	Maud Foster Drain	Cowbridge, Boston			1811	Iron Arch	II	Public Footpath. Cast at the Butterley Works in Derbyshire.	
Cowbit Road Bridge	Coronation Channel (River Welland)	Spalding				Concrete Beam		Carries Cowbit Road (B1172) between Spalding and Spalding Bypass.	
Cowbridge Lock Footbridge	West Fen Drain	Cowbridge, Boston				Concrete Beam		Public Footpath. Part of sluice/lock infrastructure.	
Crosskeys Bridge	River Nene	Sutton Bridge			1897	Swing	II*	Formerly carried a railway.	
Crowle Bridge (New)	Stainforth and Keadby Canal and South Humberside Main Line	Crowle				Concrete Beam		Carries A161. Replaced a swing bridge.	
Crow's Bridge	River Lymn	Wainfleet Bank			1812	Brick Arch	II	Carries minor road between Wainfleet Bank and Wainfleet All Saints. Designed by John Rennie.	

=== D ===
Name	Crosses	Locality	Length (m)	Longest Span (m)	Date	Type	Grade	Notes	Image
Dale Bridge	The Dale	West Rasen				Concrete Beam		Carries A631.	
Dixon Street Bridge	River Witham	Lincoln				Concrete Arch		Carries Dixon Street (B1360).	
Doddington Bridge	River Witham	Dry Doddington				Concrete Beam		Carries Doddington Lane (minor road) between Dry Doddington and the A1.	
Duckpool Bridge	Catchwater Drain	Stixwould				Concrete Arch		Carries minor road (C603) between Stixwould and Bucknall/Horsington.	
Dudley Road Footbridge	River Witham	Grantham				Steel Arch		Public footpath.	
Dunham Bridge	River Trent	Dunham-on-Trent			1832/1979	Steel Beam		Current bridge rebuilt on original piers.	

=== E ===
Name	Crosses	Locality	Length (m)	Longest Span (m)	Date	Type	Grade	Notes	Image
East Drain Bridge	East Drain	Owersby				Brick Arch		Public Footpath.	

=== F ===
Name	Crosses	Locality	Length (m)	Longest Span (m)	Date	Type	Grade	Notes	Image
Ferriby Sluice Bridge 1	New River Ancholme	Ferriby Sluice				Lift Bridge	Scheduled Ancient Monument	Carries A1077. Part of the sluice infrastructure. Ferriby Sluice is a Scheduled Ancient Monument.	
Ferriby Sluice Bridge 2	New River Ancholme	Ferriby Sluice				Concrete Beam	Scheduled Ancient Monument	Carries A1077. Part of the sluice infrastructure. Ferriby Sluice is a Scheduled Ancient Monument.	
Ferriby Sluice Bridge 3	Old River Ancholme	Ferriby Sluice				Stone Arch	Scheduled Ancient Monument	Carries Public Footpath. Ferriby Sluice is a Scheduled Ancient Monument.	
Ferriby Sluice Conveyor Bridge 1	B1204 Road	Ferriby Sluice				Steel Truss		Carries clay and cement and clay between the quarry and cement works.	
Ferriby Sluice Conveyor Bridge 2	River Ancholme	Ferriby Sluice				Steel Truss		Carries clay and cement and clay between the quarry and cement works.	
Ferriby Sluice Footbridge	Old River Ancholme	Ferriby Sluice				Steel Truss			
Ferry Farm Pipe Bridge	Foss Dyke, Lincoln to Gainsborough Line (rail)	Skellingthorpe				Steel Truss			
Firth Road Footbridge	River Witham	Lincoln				Concrete Arch		Public Footpath. Immediately parallel to Firth Road Bridge.	
Firth Road Bridge	River Witham	Lincoln				Iron Box Girder		Carries Firth Road (minor road).	
Five Mile Bridge	River Witham	Fiskerton				Steel Truss		Footbridge connecting the Water Rail Way (south bank) to the north bank and Fiskerton. So named since it is five miles east of Lincoln.	
Fosdyke Bridge	River Welland	Fosdyke				Steel Beam		Carries A17. Lowest crossing of the River Welland. Location has been an important river crossing for centuries and reputedly the location where King John lost his treasure.	
Fulbeck Low Fields Bridge	River Brant	Stragglethorpe						Carries Brant Road (minor road) between Fulbeck and Stragglethorpe.	
Fulbeck Low Fields footbridge	River Brant	Stragglethorpe						No public access.	

=== G ===
Name	Crosses	Locality	Length (m)	Longest Span (m)	Date	Type	Grade	Notes	Image
Gaunt Street Footbridge	River Witham	Lincoln				Iron Truss		Disused?	
Gipsey Bridge	Castle Dyke	Gipsey Bridge				Brick Arch		Carries B1184	
Glanford Bridge	Old River Ancholme	Brigg				Steel Beam		Carries A18.	
Godnow Bride	Stainforth and Keadby Canal	Crowle				Swing Bridge			
Grand Sluice	River Witham	Boston			1766/1883		II	Sluice designed by John Grundy and Langley Edwards. The road bridge is part of the sluice infrastructure and was added in the early 20th century.	
Grantham Bridge 1	River Witham	Grantham						Carries Belton Lane (minor road) through Grantham.	
Grantham Footbridge 1	River Witham	Grantham				Steel Arch		Public footpath.	
Great Ponton Bridge	River Witham	Great Ponton						Carries Dallygate Lane (minor road) between Great Ponton and Ermine Street (B6403).	
Great Ponton Mill Footbridge	River Witham	Great Ponton						Part of watermill infrastructure. No public access.	

=== H ===
Name	Crosses	Locality	Length (m)	Longest Span (m)	Date	Type	Grade	Notes	Image
Haddington Bridge	River Witham	Haddington				Concrete beam		Carries Bridge Road (minor road) between Haddington and Aubourn.	
Haltham Lock Footbridge	River Bain	Haltham				Concrete Beam		Public Footpath. Part of the weir (formally lock) infrastructure.	
Haltoft End Bridge	Hobhole Drain	Haltoft End						Carries A52.	
Halton Bridge	River Lymn	Halton Holegate						Carries B1195.	
Hambleton Bridge	River Witham	Syston				Concrete Beam		Carries farm track. Public footpath.	
Harlem Hill Lock Footbridge 1	River Ancholme	Bishop Norton				Steel Arch		Bridge also part of the lock infrastructure.	
Harlem Hill Lock Footbridge 2	River Ancholme	Bishop Norton				Steel Beam		Part of weir (former lock) infrastructure.	
Harrowby Mill Bridge	River Witham	Manthorpe				Concrete Beam		Part of weir (former mill) infrastructure.	
Haven Bridge	River Witham	Boston			1966	Concrete Arch		Carries the A16 John Adams Way	
Hibaldstow Bridge	River Ancholme	near Hibaldstow			1889	Iron Arch	II		
High Bridge	River Witham	Lincoln			1160	Stone Arch	I	Oldest bridge in Britain with buildings on it.	
Holbeach Road Bridge	Coronation Channel (River Welland)	Spalding				Concrete Beam		Carries Holbeach Road (A151) through Spalding.	
Holme Barn Farm Bridge	River Witham	Claypole						Carries farm track. No public access.	
Horkstow Bridge	New River Ancholme	Horkstow	42.6		1836	Suspension	II*	Designed by Sir John Rennie.	
Hospital Bridge	Maud Foster Drain	Boston			1811	Iron Arch	II	Public Footpath. Cast at the Butterley Works in Derbyshire.	
Hougham Footbridge 1	River Witham	Hougham						No public access	
Hougham Footbridge 2	River Witham (former course)	Hougham						Public footpath	
Hougham Weir Footbridge	River Witham	Hougham						Public footpath. Part of the weir infrastructure.	
Hubbert's Bridge	South Forty Foot Drain	Hubberts Bridge	17	17	1888	Brick Arch		Carries B1192. Designed by John Kingston, the County Surveyor for the Parts of Holland.	
Humber Bridge	The Humber	Barton-upon-Humber	2,220	1,410	1981	Suspension		Longest single-span in the UK and formerly the World	
Hykeham Bridge	River Witham	North Hykeham				Concrete Beam		Carries Meadow Lane (minor road) between North Hykeham and Waddington.	
Hykeham Footbridge	River Witham	North Hykeham				Concrete Beam		Public Footpath.	

=== I ===
Name	Crosses	Locality	Length (m)	Longest Span (m)	Date	Type	Grade	Notes	Image
Ings Bridge	Hobhole Drain	Boston Long Hedges				Brick arch			

=== K ===
Name	Crosses	Locality	Length (m)	Longest Span (m)	Date	Type	Grade	Notes	Image
Keadby Bridge	River Trent	Althorpe	167	46	1916	Rolling lift	II	Also known as the King George V Bridge. Combined road and rail bridge.	
Kelsey Bridge	Cow Bridge Drain	Boston, north of.						Carries A16.	
Kirkby on Bain Footbridge	River Bain	Kirkby on Bain				Concrete Beam		Public Footpath	
Kirkstead Bridge	River Witham	Woodhall Spa	293	35	1968	Concrete Arch		Carries B1191	

=== L ===
Name	Crosses	Locality	Length (m)	Longest Span (m)	Date	Type	Grade	Notes	Image
Langrick Bridge	River Witham	Langrick			1909	Steel Truss		Carries B1192	
Leadenham Mill Bridge	River Brant	Brant Broughton						Carries A17	
Lincoln University Footbridge 1	River Witham	Lincoln				Concrete Arch			
Lincoln University Footbridge 2	River Witham	Lincoln				Steel Truss Arch		Disused	
Little Ponton Bridge	River Witham	Little Ponton			1922	Concrete Beam		Carries Whalebone Lane (minor road) between Little Ponton and Woodnock.	
Long Bennington Bridge 1	River Witham	Long Bennington						Carries Westborough Lane (minor road) between Long Bennington and Westborough.	
Long Bennington Bridge 2	River Witham	Long Bennington				Concrete Beam		Carries farm track. Public footpath. Carries Viking Way.	
Long Bennington Footbridge	River Witham	Long Bennington						Carries unofficial public footpath.	
Low Road Bridge	Coronation Channel (River Welland)	Spalding						Carries Low Road (minor road) between Spalding and Spalding Bypass.	
Lush's Bridge	Mill Drain	Frithville				Concrete Beam		Carries B1183.	

=== M ===
Name	Crosses	Locality	Length (m)	Longest Span (m)	Date	Type	Grade	Notes	Image
M180 Brigg Bridge	River Ancholme	Brigg				Concrete Beam		Carries M180	
M180 Trent Viaduct	River Trent	West Butterwick	271		1979	Concrete Arch		Carries M180	
Magpie Bridge	River Witham	Lincoln				Stone Arch		Carrie Melville Street (A15). Also known as Thorne Bridge.	
Malcolm Arms Bridge	Newham Drain	Anton's Gowt				Brick Arch		Carries minor road.	
Manthorpe Bridge	River Witham	Manthorpe						No public access.	
Manthorpe Footbridge 1	River Witham (former course)	Manthorpe						No public access.	
Manthorpe Footbridge 2	River Witham (former course)	Manthorpe						No public access.	
Manthorpe Mill Bridge 1	River Witham	Manthorpe						No public access.	
Manthorpe Mill Bridge 2	River Witham (mill stream course)	Manthorpe						No public access.	
Manthorpe Mill Bridge 3	River Witham	Manthorpe						No public access.	
Market Bridge	River Bain	Great Sturton				Concrete Beam		On the site of the crossing of the Roman Lincoln to Skegness Road of the River Bain.	
Marlborough Bridge	River Brant	Marlborough						Carries farm track. No public access.	
Marsh Road Sluice Bridge	Coronation Channel (River Welland)	Spalding						Carries March Road (minor road) between Spalding and Spalding Marsh.	
Marston Mill Bridge	River Witham	Marston						Carries farm track. No public access.	
Mason's Bridge	River Bain	Coningsby				Steel Beam		Public Footpath	
Maud Foster Footbridge	Maud Foster Drain	Boston				Concrete Beam		Public Footpath	
Scott's Bridge	Melville Street (A15)	Lincoln				Concrete Arch		Public Footpath	
Mickling Plantation Bridge	River Witham	Barkston				Steel Truss		Carries farm track. Public footpath. Carries Viking Way.	
Mill Bridge	River Lymn	Great Steeping						Carries minor road between Halton Fenside and Great Steeping.	
Mill Farm Bridge	River Witham	Claypole				Brick Arch		Carries farm track. Public footpath.	
Mill Farm Bridge	River Witham	Marston						Carries farm track. No public access.	

=== N ===
Name	Crosses	Locality	Length (m)	Longest Span (m)	Date	Type	Grade	Notes	Image
New Bridge	River Rase	West Rasen				Concrete Beam		Carries A631.	
New Sleaford Road Bridge	River Witham	Beckingham				Concrete Beam		Carries A17 Beckingham Bypass	
Newsham Bridge	Newsham Lake	Brocklesby Estate			1772	Stone Arch	I	Probably designed by Capability Brown	
Northorpe Bridge	River Lymn	Northorpe						Carries minor road between Spilsby and Ashby by Partney.	
North Bridge	River Witham	Marston						Carries minor road between Marston and Hougham.	
North Soak Drain Bridge	North Soak Drain	Crowle				Brick Arch			

=== O ===
Name	Crosses	Locality	Length (m)	Longest Span (m)	Date	Type	Grade	Notes	Image
Odder Pipe Bridge	Foss Dyke, Lincoln to Gainsborough Line (rail)	Odder				Steel Truss			
Old Beckingham Bridge	River Witham	Beckingham				Concrete Beam		Public footpath	
Old North Bridge	River Witham	Marston				Brick Arch		No longer used. Replaced by North Bridge.	
Old Tollgate Bridge	Old River Ancholme	South Kelsey			18th century	Brick Arch	II		

=== P ===
Name	Crosses	Locality	Length (m)	Longest Span (m)	Date	Type	Grade	Notes	Image
Packhorse Bridge	River Rase	West Rasen			1310	Stone Arch	II* and Scheduled Ancient Monument	Has 15th-century alterations. Built by Bishop of Lincoln John Dalderby. Also known as Bishop's Bridge, but not to be confused with Bishop's Bridge two miles downstream.	
Packhorse Bridge	Unnamed Stream	Utterby			14th century	Stone Arch	II* and Scheduled Ancient Monument		
Paper Mill Farm Bridge	River Witham	Spittlegate						Carries farm track. No public access.	
Paper Mill Farm Footbridge	River Witham	Spittlegate						Part of weir infrastructure. No public access.	
Partney Bridge	River Lymn	Partney						Carries A16.	
Paul's Bridge	Frith Bank Drain	Cowbridge, Boston				Concrete Beam		Carries B1183.	
Pelham Bridge	Peterborough to Lincoln Line (rail) and local roads	Lincoln	300		1958	Concrete Arch		Carries A15 Dual-Carriageway	
Pilford Bridge	River Ancholme	Toft next Newton				Concrete Beam		Carries Highgate Lane (minor road) between Toft next Newton and Normanby-by-Spital.	
Poucher's Bridge	Catchwater Drain	Bucknall				Concrete Beam		No public access. Carries farm track.	
Pyewipe Inn Bridge	Foss Dyke, Lincoln to Gainsborough Line (rail).	Lincoln				Concrete Beam		Carries Lincoln Bypass (A46) and Sustrans route 64.	

=== R ===
Name	Crosses	Locality	Length (m)	Longest Span (m)	Date	Type	Grade	Notes	Image
Raithby Bridge	Unknown Stream	Raithby						Carries minor road between Hagworthingham and Raithby.	
Rawson's Bridge	Maud Foster Drain	Boston			1805	Brick Arch	II	Possibly designed by John Rennie	
Redcross Street Footbridge	River Witham	Grantham						Public footpath.	
Red Mill Bridge	River Bain	Kirkby on Bain				Brick Arch		Carries Rime's Lane.	
Richardson's Bridge	West Fen Drain	Cowbridge, Boston				Brick Arch		Carries B1183. Formerly known as Kitchen's Bridge.	
Riverside Drive Apartments Footbridge	River Witham	Lincoln				Concrete Beam		Public Footpath.	
Ropewalk Bridge	River Witham	Lincoln				Brick Arch			
Ropewalk Bridge 1	River Witham	Lincoln				Concrete Beam		Public Footpath. Immediately north of Ropewalk Bridge.	
Ropewalk Bridge 2	River Witham	Lincoln				Steel Truss		Public Footpath. Immediately south of Ropewalk Bridge.	
Russell Street Bridge	River Witham	Bracebridge, Lincoln			1924	Iron Beam		Public footpath. Originally located elsewhere, but moved into current location in 1924.	

=== S ===
Name	Crosses	Locality	Length (m)	Longest Span (m)	Date	Type	Grade	Notes	Image
Saltersford Bridge	River Witham	Saltersford						No public access.	
Saltersford Footbridge 1	River Witham	Saltersford						No public access.	
Saltersford Footbridge 2	River Witham	Saltersford						No public access.	
Saltersford Footbridge 3	River Witham	Saltersford						No public access.	
Sausthorpe Bridge	River Lymn	Sausthorpe						Carries minor road between Raithby and Sausthorpe.	
Saxby Bridge	River Ancholme	Saxby All Saints			19th century	Iron Arch	II		
Saxilby A57 rail bridge	Lincoln to Gainsborough Line (rail)	Saxilby				Concrete Beam		Carries A57.	
Saxilby Bridge	Foss Dyke	Saxilby				Steel Beam		Carries A57.	
Saxilby Footbridge 1	Foss Dyke	Saxilby				Iron Truss		Public footpath. At Saxilby Wharf. On site of previous swing bridge.	
Saxilby Footbridge 2	Foss Dyke	Saxilby				Steel Truss		Public footpath. Parallel to rail bridge.	
Saxilby Pipe Bridge 1	Foss Dyke	Saxilby				Steel Truss		Pipe bridge	
Saxilby Pipe Bridge 2	Foss Dyke	Saxilby				Tubular Steel Pipe		Pipe bridge	
Scawby Bridge	New River Ancholme	Brigg			1827	Stone Arch	II	Carries A18. Designed by Sir John Rennie.	
Scotwater Bridge	River Witham	Norton Disney			1850	Brick Arch			
Sherman's Wath Bridge	River Bain	West Ashby						Carries Sherman's Wath (road)	
Short Ferry Bridge	Barlings Eau	Short Ferry				Steel Arch			
Skerth Bridge	Skerth Drain	Swineshead						Carries A1121.	
Skinnand Bridge	River Brant	Skinnand						Carries minor road between Bassingham and Navenby.	
Slate Mill Bridge	River Witham	Grantham				Concrete Beam		Public footpath.	
Spalding Bridge 1	River Welland	Spalding				Concrete Beam		Carries A151 through Spalding. Part of roundabout twin bridge.	
Spalding Bridge 2	River Welland	Spalding				Concrete Beam		Carries A151 through Spalding. Part of roundabout twin bridge.	
Spalding Bypass Bridge 1	River Welland	Spalding				Steel Arch		Carries Spalding Bypass (A16).	
Spalding Bypass Bridge 2	River Welland	Spalding				Steel Arch		Carries Spalding Bypass (A1175).	
Spalding Drove Bridge	Coronation Channel (River Welland)	Spalding						Carries Spalding Drover (minor road) between Spalding and Spalding Bypass.	
Spalding Road Bridge	South Forty Foot Drain	Boston				Steel Beam		Carries A16. Replaced a railway bridge in the same location.	
St. Botolph's Footbridge	River Witham	Boston			2014	Steel Arch		Replaced a previous footbridge.	
St. Catherine's Road Bridge	River Witham	Grantham						Carries St Catherine's Road (minor road) through Grantham.	
Stapleford Church Bridge	River Witham	Stapleford				Concrete Beam			
Stapleford Bridge	River Witham	Stapleford						Carries Clay Lane (minor road) between Stapleford and Brant Broughton.	
Station Street Bridge	River Witham	Lincoln						Carries Station Street (minor road).	
Stockwith Mill Bridge	River Lymn	Harrington				Brick Arch		Carries Harrington Road (minor road) between Hagworthingham and Harrington	
Stone Bridge	Stone Bride Drain	Frithville				Concrete Beam			
Stonebridge Road Bridge	River Witham	Grantham				Concrete Beam		Carries minor road (Stonebridge Road) through Grantham.	
Stragglethorpe Bridge 1	River Brant	Stragglethorpe						Public footpath	
Stragglethorpe Bridge 2	Sand Beck	Stragglethorpe						Public footpath	
Stragglethorpe Bridge 2	Sand Beck	Stragglethorpe						Carries farm track. No public access.	
Stragglethorpe Bridge 2	Sand Beck	Stragglethorpe						Carries farm track. No public access.	
Swineshead Bridge	South Forty Foot Drain	Swineshead Bridge				Concrete Beam		Carries A17.	

=== T ===
Name	Crosses	Locality	Length (m)	Longest Span (m)	Date	Type	Grade	Notes	Image
Tattershall Bridge (New)	River Witham	Tattershall	68					Carries A153	
Tattershall Bridge (Old)	River Witham	Tattershall				Brick Arch		Former highway crossing, now only for pedestrian traffic.	
Tattershall Sluice Footbridge	River Bain	Tattershall				Steel Truss			
Thorpe Culvert Bridge	River Lymn	Thorpe Culvert						Carries minor road between Thorpe Culvert and Wainfleet Bank.	
Thurlby Bridge	River Witham	Bassingham				Brick arch		Carries Bassingham Road (minor road) between Bassingham and Thurlby.	
Titanic Bridge	River Witham	Lincoln			1912/1990	Iron Arch (formerly lifting)		Formerly railway bridge and lifting bridge. Was converted to fixed bridge in 1990.	
Torksey Lock Bridge	Foss Dyke	Torksey				Concrete Arch		Carries A156. Part of the lock infrastructure.	
Torksey Lock Footbridge	Foss Dyke	Torksey				Steel Arch		Public Footpath. Part of the lock infrastructure.	
Torksey Viaduct	River Trent	Torksey	256	39.6	1849	Iron Box Girder	II*	Designed by John Fowler. Currently being converted into a cycle/pedestrian path by Sustrans as part of the National Cycle Network.	
Town Bridge	River Witham	Boston			1808/1913	Iron Arch	II	Designed by John Rennie, and largely rebuilt in 1913.	
Trent Bridge	River Trent	Gainsborough	100	21	1791	Stone Arch	II	Designed by William Weston. Carries A631.	
Trinity Bridge	None, historically the River Welland	Crowland			1390	Stone Arch	I	Three-way bridge	

=== W ===
Name	Crosses	Locality	Length (m)	Longest Span (m)	Date	Type	Grade	Notes	Image
Warth's Bridge	River Lymn	Thorpe Culvert						Carries minor road between Thorpe Fendykes and Thorpe Culvert.	
Westborough Footbridge 1	River Witham	Westborough				Steel Beam		Public footpath. Carries Viking Way.	
Westborough Footbridge 2	River Witham	Westborough				Concrete Beam		Public bridleway	
White House Bridge	River Lymn	Wainfleet				Brick Arch		Carries a minor road between Wainfleet All Saints and the coast.	
Wigford Way	River Witham	Lincoln	19	19	1972	Concrete Beam		Carries A57 Wigford Way Dual-Carriageway	
Willson's Gorse Bridge	River Brant	Stragglethorpe						Carries farm track. No public access.	
Wisemans Bridge	South Soak Drain	Crowle			1989	Steel Beam		Pedestrian Bridge built by Bullivant Engineering for Keadby Canal JAC.	
Witham Farm Bridge	River Witham	Claypole						Carries farm track. No public access.	
Witham Washland Control Site Bridge	River Witham	South Hykeham			1980s	Concrete Arch		Carries farm track. No public access. Part of flood defence infrastructure.	
Wyberton High Bridge	South Forty Foot Drain	Boston	22.5	22.5	1930	Concrete Arch		Carries A52. Built for Holland County Council.	

== Other bridges ==
Name	Crosses	Locality	Length (m)	Longest Span (m)	Date	Type	Grade	Notes	Image
Cowbridge Aqueduct	Cow Bridge Drain	Cowbridge, Boston						Carries Stonebridge Drain.	

== See also ==
- List of railway bridges and viaducts in the United Kingdom
- List of canal aqueducts in the United Kingdom
- List of tunnels in the United Kingdom
- List of bridges
