= Skinnand =

Deserted medieval village in Lincolnshire, England

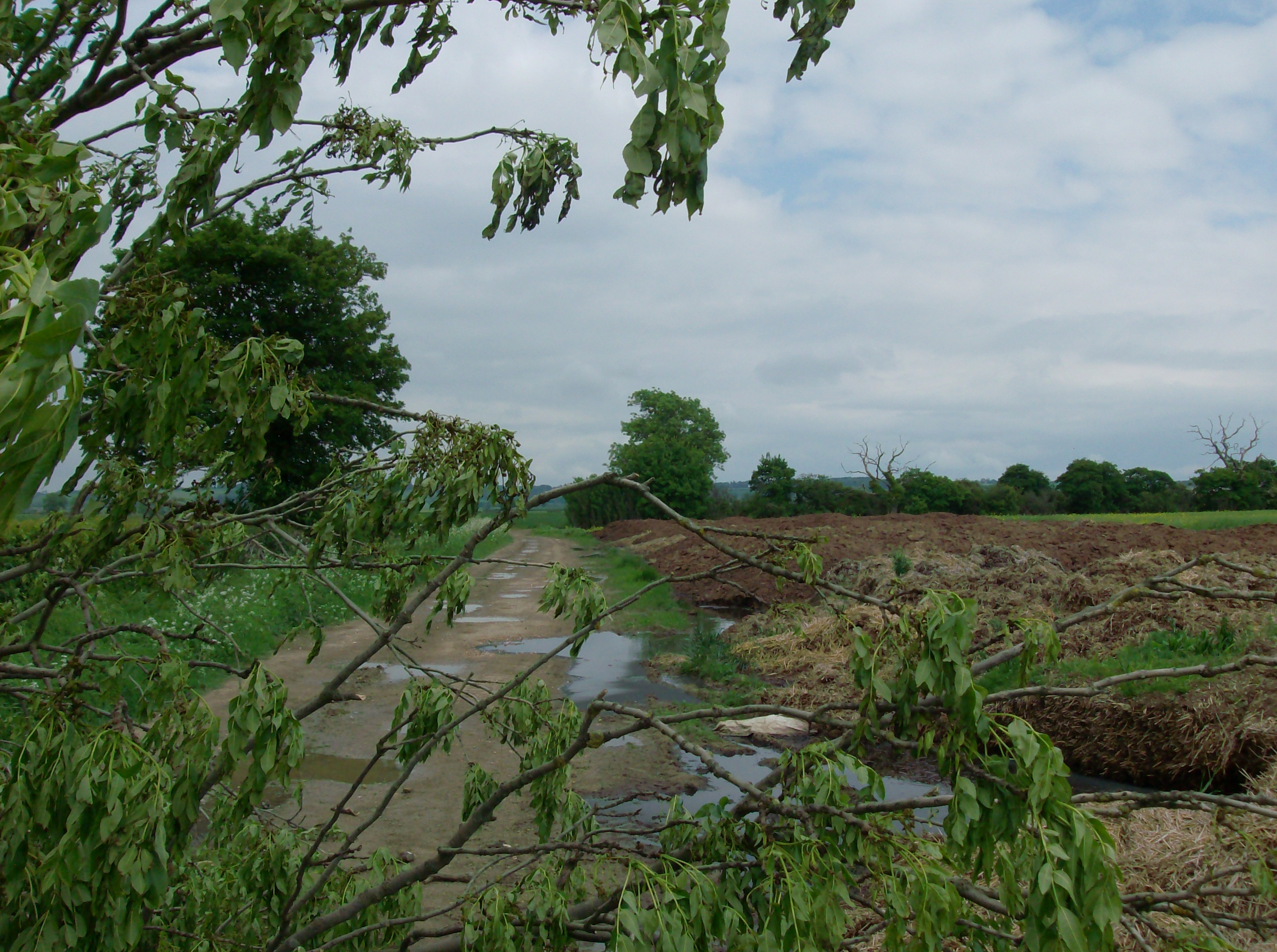
- The field where Skinnand once stood

- Location within Lincolnshire
- OS grid reference: SK9457
  - London: 110 mi (180 km) S
- Civil parish: Navenby
- District: North Kesteven
- Shire county: Lincolnshire
- Region: East Midlands
- Country: England
- Sovereign state: United Kingdom
- Post town: LINCOLN
- Postcode district: LN5
- Dialling code: 01522
- Police: Lincolnshire
- Fire: Lincolnshire
- Ambulance: East Midlands
- UK Parliament: Sleaford and North Hykeham

Skinnand is a deserted medieval village in the civil parish of Navenby, in the North Kesteven district, in the county of Lincolnshire, England. It was a small farming community situated 9 miles (14 km) south of Lincoln and 11.5 miles (19 km) northwest of Sleaford, composed of a church and several houses. During the English Civil War of 1642-1646 the church fell into ruins. Today only fields and one deserted farmhouse remain.

== History ==
=== Early history ===
Archaeological investigations in the area around Skinnand indicate the countryside was occupied from at least the Bronze Age, in about 600 BC. The remains of Iron Age farms have been found at nearby Navenby, 2.5 miles (4 km) west of Skinnand, as well as Bronze Age and Roman remains. Skinnand was recorded as "Schinende" in the Domesday Book of 1086, a name thought to be of Anglo-Saxon origin. Historians believe the original name may have come from the Old Scandinavian word "skinnari," which means "skinner or tanner."

=== Middle Ages ===
The ancient parish of Skinnand was recorded as the smallest village in the Deanery of Longoboby in 1332. It had the lowest tax assessment, a population of around 40 and was predominantly based on agriculture. The population of Skinnand stayed stable for many generations but, by 1563, only three of the original ten households remained. This decrease in numbers has been attributed, by some historians, to a reduction in arable farming and a rise in sheep production.

Records show that the village of Skinnand had up to six houses before the English Civil War, most built as small single-storey stone dwellings with thatched roofs. Two, however, were much larger. One was owned by a John Chester, which boasted four domestic rooms with 'upper chambers,' and the other was the parsonage. The parsonage included a hall, two parlours, a kitchen, buttery, milkhouse, brewhouse and stable. It also had three upstairs rooms, as well as an orchard, garden, yard and dovecote. It is believed the parsonage was pulled down, however, during the Civil War and, by the time of the Hearth Tax returns of 1665, there were just three houses in Skinnand.

Details about the Norman-built Anglican church of Skinnand are sketchy, although it was reputedly dedicated to St Matthew and burned down by Oliver Cromwell's forces in the 1640s. Historical records certainly show that it had begun to fall into ruins in the 17th century - at around the time of the English Civil War. The Glebe Terrier documents of 1700 recorded: "The church was in ruins, no house for the rector, more than this we find not, all the buildings being long since disappeared." Despite the disappearance of the church, parish registers reveal that services were still held throughout the 19th century, at the home of Skinnand man John Woolfitt. The Skinnand burial ground was also in use until 1911.

=== 19th century ===
Skinnand was a village of just 12 people in 1801, according to the Census returns. The population did rise slightly over the next 100 years, to 30 in 1901, but by 1921 numbers were once again decreasing and the figure stood at 25. Census returns also reveal that most of the village men worked on the land as unskilled labourers. The children of these poor labourers attended school at Wellingore, just south of Navenby, and at Carlton-le-Moorland and Bassingham - each village several miles walk away.

As a result of the Poor Law Amendment Act 1834, the parish became part of the Lincoln Poor Law Union and, by the mid-19th century, Skinnand was a struggling parish in the Higher division of the wapentake of Boothby Graffoe. According to the Institute of Historical Research, it consisted of 636 acres (2.57 km^{2}), of which 40 were arable and the rest "old pasture and meadow." The records add: "The living is a discharged rectory, valued in the King's books at £5. 13. 11½.; net income, £85; patron, S. Nicholls, Esq. The church is in ruins." Skinnand was also the main residence in the area for the Woolfitt family, land owners and clergy at the church. Headstones for members of the Woolfitt family, including local Methodist minister John Woolfitt, can be found in the remains of the cemetery.

In 1871 it was recorded that "just a few stones remain to mark the location" of the old church. In the same year, the Census showed that the parish now consisted of only three farms, all belonging to Mr S. Nicholls of London. Other surnames in the parish at that time included Clawson, Burt and Picker.

=== 20th century ===
The 1911 Census shows that the population of Skinnand was once again in decline at the turn of the 20th century, with just 28 people living in the village. Most were tenant labourers as, by 1913, William Grant of Grimsby was the principal landowner. The village was occupied for just a few more years, however, before the final families moved out. Today, just a boarded up old farm house stands where the thriving community of Skinnand once was.

== Governance ==
The parish of Skinnand was in the higher division of the ancient Boothby Graffoe wapentake, in the North Kesteven division of the county of Lincolnshire. The term wapentake dates back to the Vikings and was used to describe a collection of local parishes. It meant "show your weapon" and the idea behind the term was that all those in favour of a resolution would raise their sword or axe to show agreement.

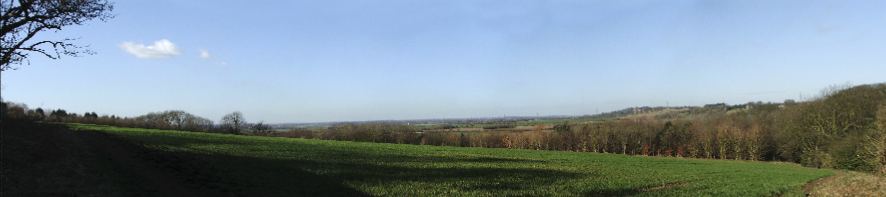
A panoramic view across Navenby lowfields, where Skinnand once stood, taken from the top of the Lincoln Cliff at Clint Lane, Navenby

The History of the County of Lincoln, a book written by Thomas Allen in 1834, states:

The Wapentake of Boothby Graffoe is bounded on the north by Lawress wapentake; on the east by Lincoln Liberty and Langoe wapentake; on the south by Loveden wapentake; and on the west by Nottinghamshire. It is separated into High and Low Divisions. Through this wapentake a Roman road passes from Lincoln to Brough, a village just without the bounds of the county. The High division of the wapentake of Boothby Graffoe contains the villages of Boothby, Coleby, Harmston, Navenby, Skinnard, Swinethorpe, Welbourn and Wellingore. Navenby used to be a market town. The living is a rectory, rated at £17 10s. 0d., and is in the patronage of the Master and Fellows of Christ Church College, Cambridge.

Skinnand was classed as an ancient parish from the 11th to the 19th century, as it came "under the jurisdiction of a clergyman" and existed before 1597. Early records show that the Manor of Navenby and Skinnand was granted to the Dean and Chapter of Lincoln in 1292. The money generated by land rent was used by Roger de Newton, the first incumbent of the chantry chapel at Harby, Nottinghamshire, to maintain the building. This followed the death of Queen Eleanor, wife of Edward I, while on a visit to Lincoln. Eleanor died at de Newton's manor house at Harby in November 1290 and the chapel was erected in her honour.

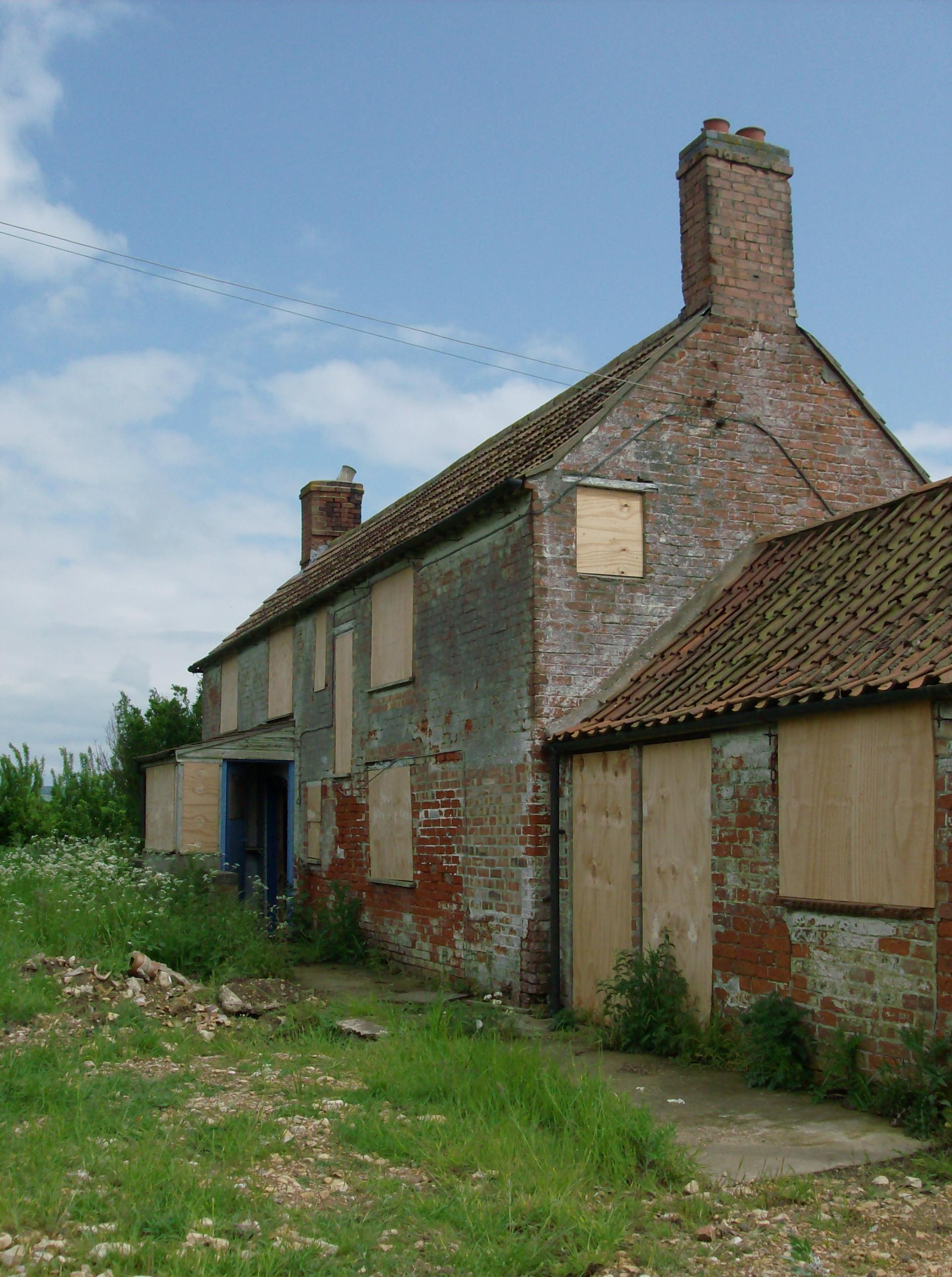
A derelict farmhouse – about one mile south-southeast of the site of Skinnand

The parish began to take on civil and ecclesiastical duties following the 16th century dissolution of the monasteries and the Tudor Poor Relief Act 1601. The ecclesiastical parish of Navenby was placed in the Longoboby Rural Deanery, but was transferred to the Graffoe Rural Deanery in 1968, and it is still part of the Diocese of Lincoln. Navenby became a civil parish in the 19th century and became a member of the Lincoln Poor Law Union in 1834. The parish was also part of the Lincoln Rural Sanitary District. On 1 April 1931 the parish was abolished and merged with Navenby. In 1921 the parish had a population of 25.

Following the Local Government Act 1888, Skinnand was governed by Branston Rural District Council from 1894 to 1931. The village then came under the control of North Kesteven Rural District Council from 1931 to 1974, after the Local Government Act 1972 reformed the districts of Holland, Kesteven and much of Lindsey into the shire county of Lincolnshire. Today Skinnand remains part of the North Kesteven district.

Before the Reform Act 1832 (2 & 3 Will. 4. c. 45), Lincolnshire sent twelve members to parliament, including two for the county, two for the city of Lincoln and two for the boroughs of Boston, Grantham, Great Grimsby and Stamford. As a result of the act, Lincolnshire's electoral divisions were amended, and Skinnand became part of the South Division Parliamentary District for Lincolnshire. Two Whig candidates, Henry Handley and Gilbert John Heathcote, were returned in the first election. The village remained in the South Division until 1867, when it was transferred to the Mid Division. In 1885 it joined the North Kesteven Division, and in 1918 it became part of the Grantham Division, until 1974.

== Geography ==
The civil parish of Skinnand lies close to the old Roman Ermine Street, known locally as High Dyke. The road runs between the neighbouring villages of Boothby Graffoe, Navenby and Wellingore and covers more than 2,100 acres (8.5 km^{2}). The Viking Way, a 147-mile (237 km) footpath between the Humber Bridge in North Lincolnshire and Oakham in Rutland, also passes through the parish.

Skinnand is located at 53°06′25″N 0°35′49″W and is situated just below the ridge of Jurassic limestone called the Lincoln Edge or Lincoln Cliff. The small cliff is one of only a few hills in Lincolnshire. Lying 8.7 miles (14 km) south of Lincoln and 8.9 miles (14.3 km) north-northwest of Sleaford, Skinnand enjoys warm summers and dry frosty winters.

During the Ice Age, most of the region surrounding Skinnand was covered by ice sheets and this has influenced the topography and nature of the soils. Much of Lincolnshire is low-lying, in some places below sea level, including Skinnand. The parish of Skinnand and Navenby is elongated in an east–west direction, extending east to the Lincoln Heath and west to the River Brant. The size of the parish has varied over the past two centuries. In 1821 it covered 2,110 acres (8.5 km^{2}); in 1951 it was 3,345 acres (13.54 km^{2}).

== Climate ==
According to the Köppen classification, the British Isles experience a maritime climate characterised by relatively cool summers and mild winters. Compared with other parts of the country, Lincolnshire – and Skinnand – are slightly warmer and sunnier in the summer and colder and frostier in the winter. Owing to Skinnand's inland position, far from the landfall of most Atlantic depressions, it is one of the driest places to live in the UK, receiving, on average, less than 3 ft (600 mm) of rain per year. The mean annual daily duration of bright sunshine is four hours and 12 minutes; the absence of any high ground is probably responsible for the area being one of the sunniest parts of the British Isles.

Climate data for Skinnand
Month	Jan	Feb	Mar	Apr	May	Jun	Jul	Aug	Sep	Oct	Nov	Dec	Year
Mean daily maximum °F	43	44	49	54	60	65	70	70	64	57	48	44	56
Mean daily minimum °F	35	35	38	40	45	50	54	54	51	46	40	37	42
Average precipitation inches	1.45	1.08	1.04	1.46	1.13	1.51	1.7	1.45	1.61	1.83	1.51	1.38	21
Mean daily maximum °C	6	7	9	12	16	18	21	21	18	14	9	7	13
Mean daily minimum °C	2	2	3	4	7	10	12	12	11	8	4	3	6
Average precipitation mm	37	27	26	37	29	38	43	37	41	46	38	35	530
Source: MSN
