= Hatton, Lincolnshire =

Village in Lincolnshire, England

Coordinates: 53.275970°N 0.234609°W

Hatton
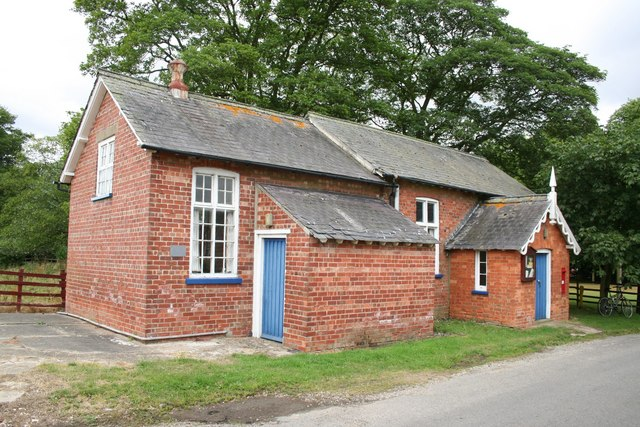
- Hatton village hall (one time school, now a private residence)

- Location within Lincolnshire
- Population: 200 (Including Hatton. 2011)
- OS grid reference: TF178768
  - London: 120 mi (190 km) S
- District: East Lindsey
- Shire county: Lincolnshire
- Region: East Midlands
- Country: England
- Sovereign state: United Kingdom
- Post town: Market Rasen
- Postcode district: LN8
- Police: Lincolnshire
- Fire: Lincolnshire
- Ambulance: East Midlands
- UK Parliament: Louth and Horncastle

Hatton is a small village and civil parish in the East Lindsey district of Lincolnshire, England. It is situated 3 miles (5 km) east of the town of Wragby, 6 miles (10 km) north-west of the town of Horncastle, and just north of the A158 road.

Neighbouring villages are Sotby, Panton, and Great Sturton.

Hatton Wood, a Site of Special Scientific Interest (SSSI), lies 1 mile (1.6 km) to the south-west of the village. It forms part of the Bardney Limewoods National Nature Reserve. Hatton Meadows, a nature reserve belonging to the Lincolnshire Wildlife Trust, lies to the north of Hatton Wood.

The National Transmission System has one of its twenty-six compressor stations, driven by three gas turbines, just off the A158 west of the village at Hatton Bridge.

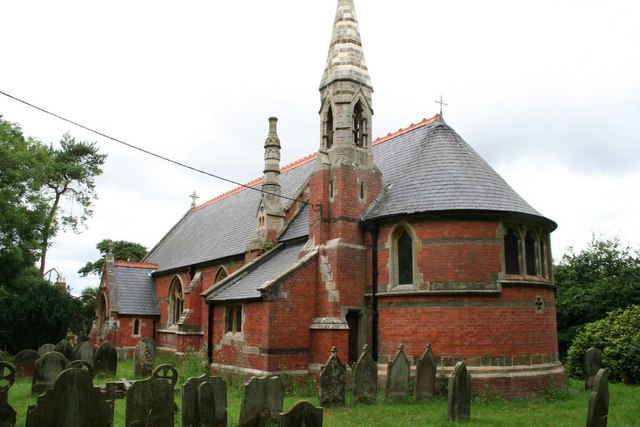
St.Stephen's Church

Hatton church is dedicated to Saint Stephen, and is a Grade II listed building dating from the 13th century, rebuilt in 1870 by James Fowler.

The deserted medieval village (DMV) of Schankeston was in or near the village.

A public house on the A158, The New Midge, is currently closed.
