= Ferriby =

Ferriby is the name of two places, on opposite sides of the Humber Estuary

- North Ferriby, in the East Riding of Yorkshire
- South Ferriby, in North Lincolnshire

The two were historically linked by a ferry.

- Ferriby railway station serves North Ferriby.
- Ferriby Sluice is a hamlet to the west of South Ferriby.
