= Bassingham =

Village and civil parish in the North Kesteven district of Lincolnshire, England

Coordinates: 53.12939°N 0.63901°W

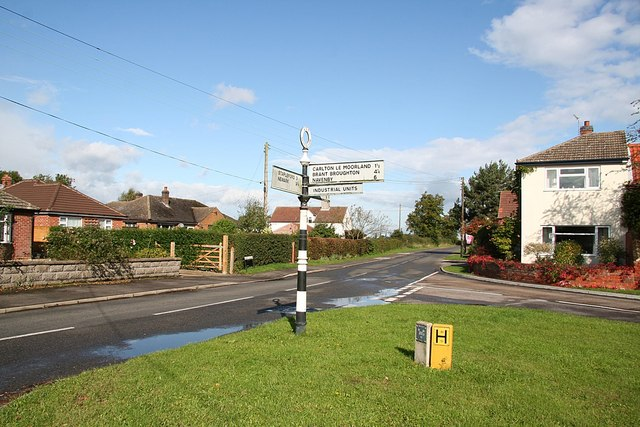
- Bassingham

- Location within Lincolnshire
- Population: 1,425 (2011)
- OS grid reference: SK911599
  - London: 110 mi (180 km) S
- District: North Kesteven
- Shire county: Lincolnshire
- Region: East Midlands
- Country: England
- Sovereign state: United Kingdom
- Post town: LINCOLN
- Postcode district: LN5
- Dialling code: 01522
- Police: Lincolnshire
- Fire: Lincolnshire
- Ambulance: East Midlands
- UK Parliament: Sleaford and North Hykeham

Bassingham is a village and civil parish in the North Kesteven district of Lincolnshire, England. The population of the civil parish at the 2011 census was 1,425. The village is situated approximately 8 miles (13 km) south-west of Lincoln.

Bassingham is situated about midway between Newark-on-Trent and Lincoln. The parish is defined by the River Witham to the west, and the River Brant to the east (across Bassingham Fen). To the south-west is Carlton-le-Moorland.

A Ham class minesweeper, HMS Bassingham, was named after the village.

The church of St. Michael and All Angels was recorded in the Domesday Book of 1086. The church is in the Bassingham Group of seven churches.

In 1998 the church added a seventh bell: the ship's bell from HMS Bassingham, presented by her former commander after she was decommissioned. It hangs in a mahogany bell hood in the north aisle and is rung to signal the start of Sunday worship.

Bassingham has two public houses, the Five Bells and the Bugle Horn, a primary school, and a Methodist chapel.

== Notable people from Bassingham ==
- Jack Harvey (born 1993), racing driver and IndyCar Series pit reporter and commentator for FOX Sports
