= Stapleford Woods =

Woodland in Lincolnshire, England

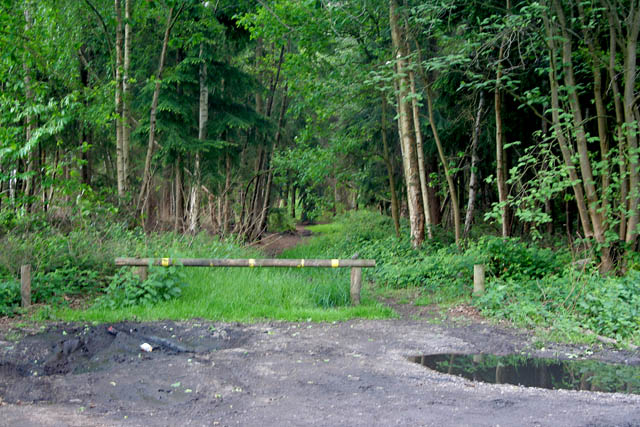
- Stapleford Woods

- Location within Lincolnshire
- Interactive map of Stapleford Woods

Geography
- Location: Lincolnshire, East Midlands, England
- Coordinates: 53°05′57″N 0°42′54″W

Administration
- Status: Working forest, accessible to visitors via marked woodland paths
- Established: pre-1600s
- Authority: Forestry Commission
- Website: www.forestry.gov.uk/forestry/englandlincolnshirenoforeststaplefordwoods

Ecology
- Forest cover: 750 acres (300 ha)
- Dominant tree species: Scots pine, Corsican pine, Silver Birch, Rhododendrons

Stapleford Woods form an area of ancient woodland and forest in Stapleford, Lincolnshire, England. The boundary of the ancient woods follows the county boundary between Lincolnshire and Nottinghamshire.

== History ==
Left in ancient times to Trinity College, Cambridge, the 750 acres (300 ha) site was clear-felled during the early stages of World War I to supply local industry. Left unplanted between the wars, the grounds were used as a British Army camp and training grounds during World War II.

In September 1943 No. 239 Squadron RAF had moved to RAF Ayr to train as a night fighter unit, and re-equipped with the De Havilland Mosquito. It then moved to RAF West Raynham, Norfolk to join No. 100 (Bomber Support) Group, participating in night time operations against enemy Nazi-Luftwaffe fighters. On 27 October 1944 during fighter affiliation training with No. 49 Squadron RAF, a Mosquito piloted by F/Lt J.H.Roberts and accompanied by Flight Engineer Sgt. A.M.Ashcroft, stalled and crashed in the woods, with the immediate death of both pilot and passenger.

After hostilities had ceased in late 1945, the woods were bought by the newly formed Forestry Commission. Along with much woodland in the River Trent valley, the site was extensively replanted in the 1950s with Scots and Corsican pine, chosen to supply local industry.

== Present ==
Now a managed working forest under the care of Forestry England, surveys in 2004 found that the wood dated back at least 400 years, making it a designated ancient woodland. While many visitors are attracted by the Victorian era-plated Rhododendrons which are found throughout the wood at heights of up to 7 metres (23 ft), Forestry England and North Kesteven council have agreed to a 50-year plan to restore the forest to its original broad-leaf tree state. Initial clearance of a 75 acres (30 ha) area yielded a resultant crop of purple flowering heather, which germinated from seeds that had been buried for over 70 years.

== Leisure ==
The Forestry England car park grid reference SK861569 gives access to a circular walk, which takes 30-40 minutes to complete. The car park can be accessed from Coddington Lane whilst travelling through the woods.

== The Real Badlands ==
The woods were the main backdrop for the 2009 documentary film The Real Badlands produced by Current TV and Rockwood Pictures, by British filmmakers Tim Clark and Craig Ford. The film tells the story of a Newark-on-Trent couple (Simon Burgess and Susan Moran) fed up with modern-day life, who quit their jobs, sell all of their possessions and move into the woods.

The film was shot in the woods and Kelham, near Newark, during the summer and winter of 2008. After release the film was controversial, due to claims that the film was in fact a mockumentary. The filmmakers publicly denied these claims in a written statement read out live on Current TV, minutes after the film was broadcast.
