= Hough Priory =

Priory in Hough-on-the-Hill, England

Hough Priory was a priory in Hough-on-the-Hill, Lincolnshire, England. The manor on which the priory of Hough was afterwards built was granted by Henry I to his abbey of St. Mary de Voto at Cherbourg, for Austin canons. The parent abbey itself at its foundation contained only an abbot and four canons, and the cell having no other endowment than the manor and church of Hough, was intended for the support of a prior with a single chaplain for his companion, to maintain divine service for the soul of the king and his family.

The prior was at first bound to send a fixed sum of money to Cherbourg every year; after the beginning of the Hundred Years' War (1337–1453) this pension was transferred to the Exchequer. Early in the fourteenth century the assistant chaplain was withdrawn, as the revenue was not sufficient to support two canons any longer, and in 1340, the prior himself was reduced to such straits that he had to beseech Edward III of England for remission of his arrears, amounting to 55 marks. An inquisition of the property was taken in 1349, when it was again found almost impossible to pay the pension appointed. The priory mill had become broken and useless, and nearly all the trees had been cut down; indeed, almost everything of value in the house had been sold to supply the money due to the Exchequer. Most of the chantries founded in the priory church had lapsed, as the prior could not serve them all by himself.

The priory was restored to the abbey of Cherbourg in 1399, but finally granted to the Carthusians of Mountgrace in 1432, (fn. 6) and confirmed to them by Edward IV of England in 1462.

The revenue of the priory was valued in 1388 at £38 8s. 8d.
