= River Brant =

River in Lincolnshire, England

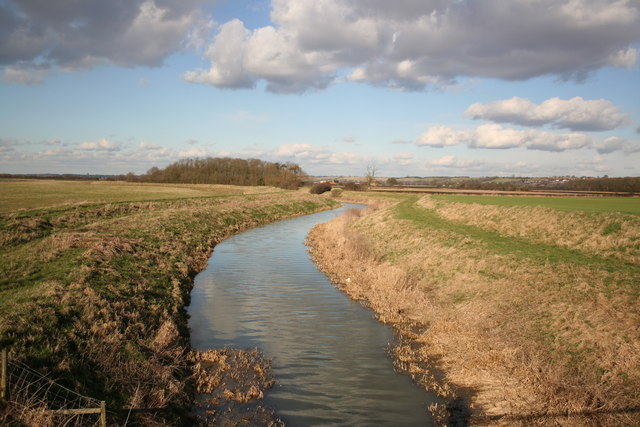
- The River Brant at Blackmoor bridge

Location
- Country: United Kingdom
- Country within the UK: England
- Counties: Lincolnshire
- District: North Kesteven, South Kesteven
- Villages: Gelston, Brandon, Stragglethorpe, Brant Broughton

Physical characteristics
- Source
  - location: Gelston, Lincolnshire
  - coordinates: 52.9948°N 0.6438°W
  - elevation: 60 m (200 ft)
- Mouth
  - location: River Witham near South Hykeham, Lincolnshire
  - coordinates: 53.1623°N 0.5772°W
  - elevation: 5 m (16 ft)
- Length: 23 km (14 mi)
- Basin size: 138 km^{2} (53 sq mi)
- Discharge
  - location: Brant Broughton
  - average: 0.24 m^{3}/s (8.5 cu ft/s)

Basin features
- Tributaries
  - left: Sand Beck, West Brant Syke
  - right: The Beck

The River Brant is a 14 mi-long (23 km) tributary of the River Witham that flows entirely within the county of Lincolnshire, in the east of England.

In 1855 the river was described as follows:

"Brant, a tributary of the Witham in the western part of the county of Lincoln. This small stream has its rise in several fine springs in the parish of Hough-on-the-Hill, and pursues its humble course in a northern direction, westward of a range of high land."

== Name ==
The origin of the name is from the Old English brant (meaning "steep", "deep"), referring to a steeply sloping incline.

== Course ==
The Brant rises on the flank of Summerfields Hill to the south-west of Gelston near Hough-on-the-Hill, and curves round such that it flows almost directly north, parallel to the Limestone Lincolnshire Edge. The river flows past Brandon to which it gives its name, then reaches Stragglethorpe where it is joined by The Beck, which drains Fulbeck. At Brant Broughton it meets with its largest tributary the Sand Beck, and then continues north passing the Low Fields of Navenby, Boothby Graffoe and Coleby where it flows to the west of the deserted medieval village of Skinnand and the remains of Somerton Castle. Further north it then reaches its confluence with the River Witham between the villages of Aubourn and South Hykeham.

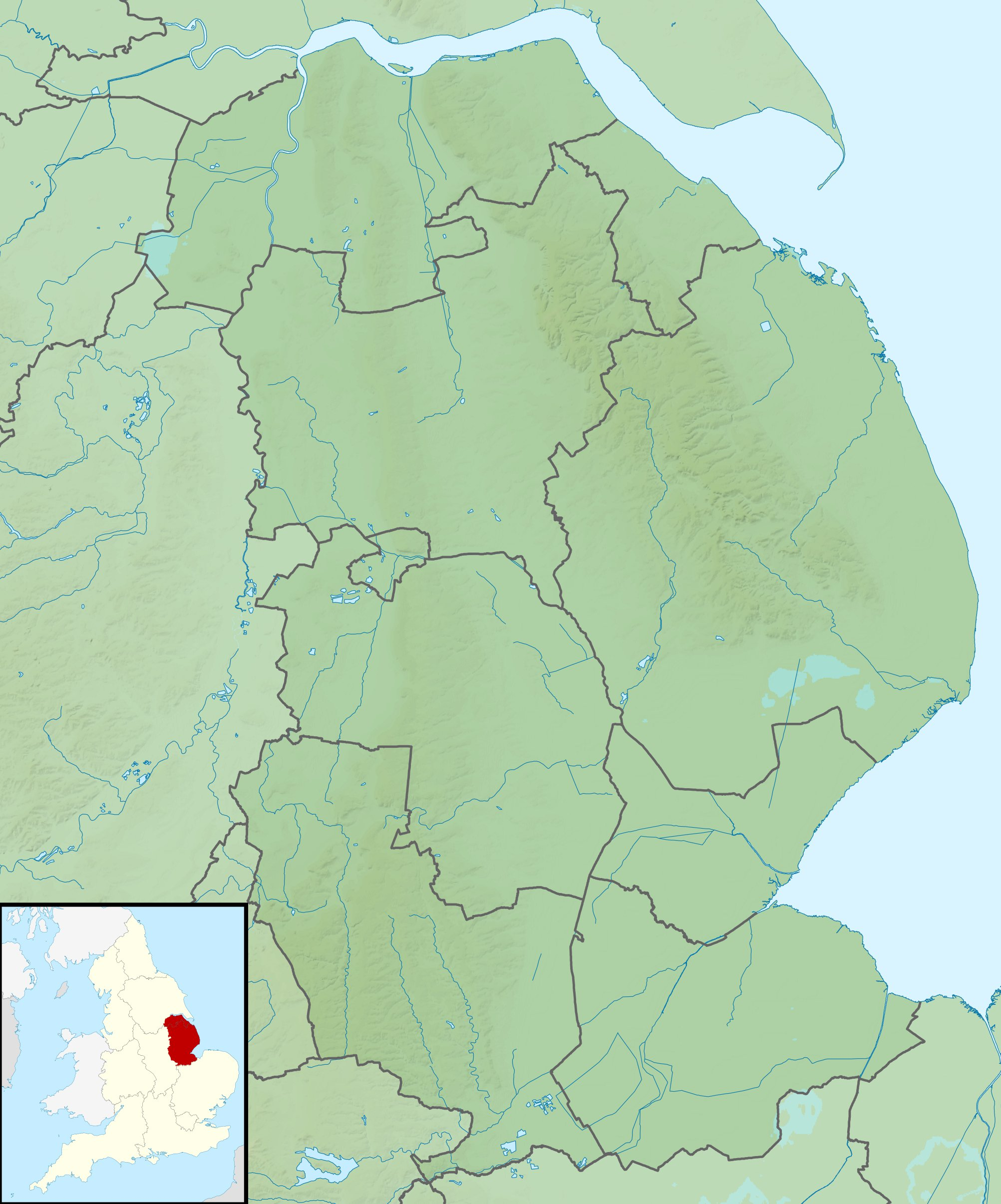
Map showing Lincoln, and the course of the Brant and locations along its length in Lincolnshire

== See also ==
- Upper Witham IDB
