= Catchwater Drain (Stixwould) =

Artificial watercourse in Lincolnshire, England

Coordinates: 53.1705°N 0.2703°W

Catchwater Drain Duckpool Catchwater
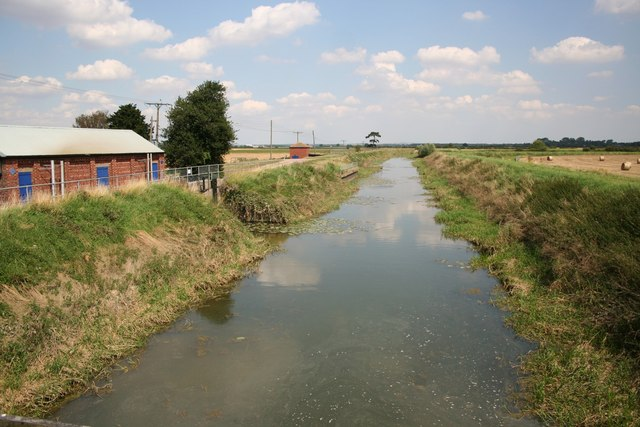
- Catchwater Drain at its mouth at the River Witham

Physical characteristics
- Source
  - location: Great Sturton
- Mouth
  - location: River Witham

Basin features
- Tributaries
  - left: Wispington Beck, All Hallows Drain, Monk's Drain, Reeds Beck

The Catchwater Drain (or Duckpool Catchwater, or Bucknall Catchwater) is an artificial watercourse in Lincolnshire draining into the River Witham near to Stixwould. It begins as Minting Beck, a stream originating in Great Sturton approximately 5 miles (8 km) north of Horncastle, which becomes known as Great Drain between Gautby and Bucknall. Tributaries include Wispington Beck, All Hallows Drain, Monk's Drain/Poolham Beck and Reeds Beck. It runs for 4.88 miles (7.85 km).
