= Horkstow Bridge =

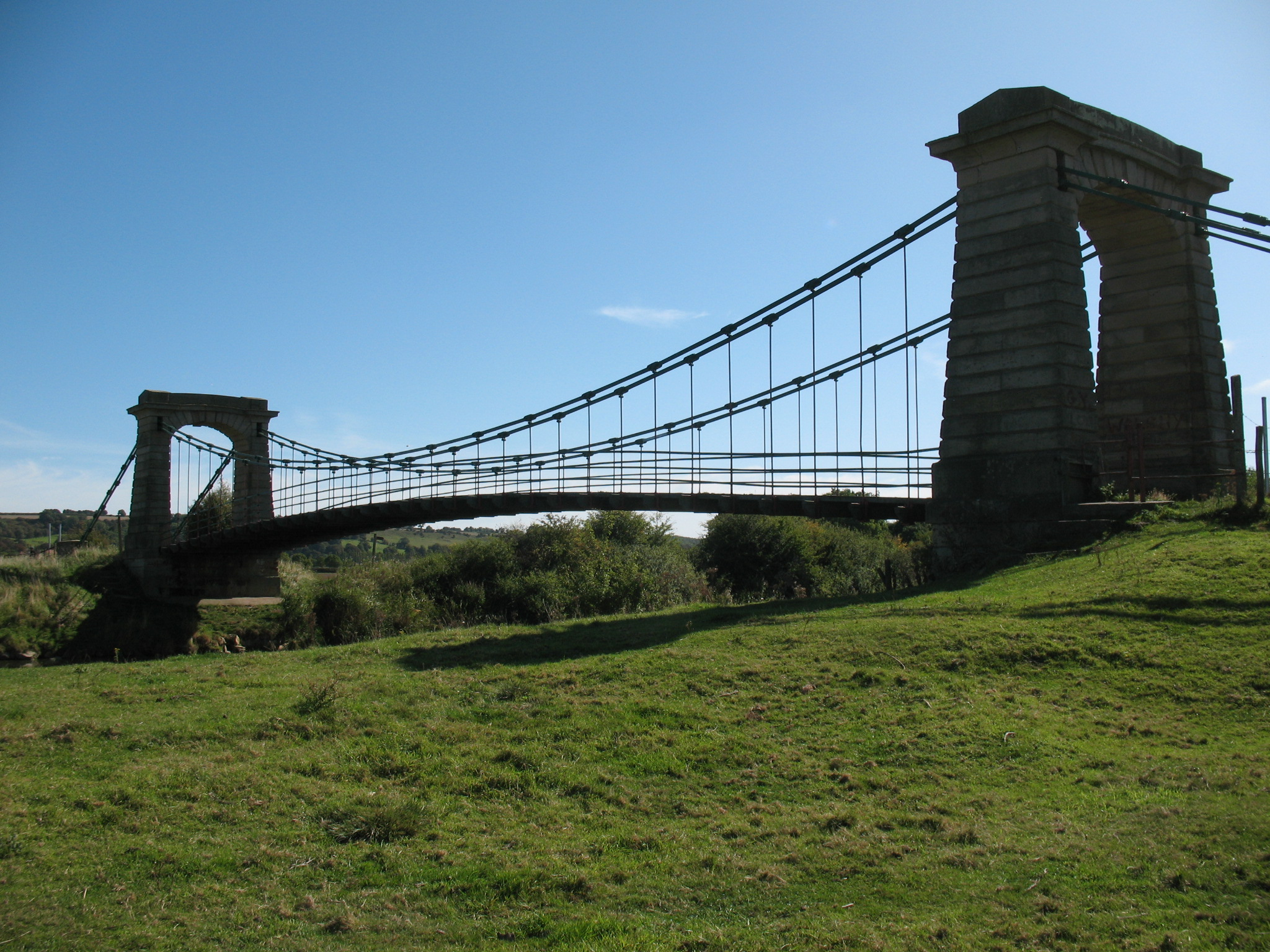
- Viewed from field below raised riverbank
- Coordinates: 53.6585°N 0.5280°W
- Crosses: New River Ancholme
- Locale: North Lincolnshire
- Maintained by: Environment Agency
- Heritage status: UK Grade II* listed building

Characteristics
- Design: Suspension
- Material: Wrought iron, timber
- Total length: 42.6 m (140 ft)
- Width: 4.3 m (14 ft)
- No. of spans: 1
- Load limit: 5 t
- Clearance below: 4.7 m (15 ft 5 in)

History
- Designer: Sir John Rennie
- Construction end: 1836

Horkstow Bridge is a suspension bridge that spans the New River Ancholme near the village of Horkstow in North Lincolnshire. It was designed by Sir John Rennie as part of the River Ancholme Drainage Scheme, completed in 1836, and is a Grade II* listed building.

== History and description ==
The River Ancholme rises south of Bishopbridge in Lincolnshire, flows northwards through the town of Brigg and the Ancholme Level, an area of fenland, and enters the Humber at Ferriby Sluice. Attempts were made to drain the wetland and improve the navigability of the river as early as the 13th century, and in the 1630s Sir John Monson constructed the first sluice gates near South Ferriby and a new straight channel, the Ancholme Navigation, to drain the Level and protect the town of Brigg from flooding. A 1767 Act of Parliament authorised works towards "the more effectual draining the Lands lying in the Level of Ancholme" and making the river navigable as high as Bishopbridge, to be financed by a land tax and the imposition of tolls on goods carried. Two further Acts followed to enlarge the powers of the first. Under the 1825 Act, Sir John Rennie proposed the New River Ancholme Drainage Scheme, by which the navigation, or New River Ancholme, was straightened, widened and deepened, existing small bridges with many arches were replaced by single-span structures, and the locks at Ferriby Sluice were enlarged.

Horkstow Bridge, the only suspension bridge designed by Rennie, is one of several bridges built as part of that project. The ironwork was supplied by Messrs John and Edward Walker of Gospel Oak Ironworks, Tipton, Staffordshire, and the bridge was completed in 1836 under the supervision of site engineer Adam Smith. At each end of the bridge are rusticated stone piers in the form of 6.5 m (21 ft) towers which form archways above the road. The single span measures 42.6 m (140 ft) from centre to centre of the masonry towers and the entrance to the bridge deck through the archways is 3.5 m (11 ft) wide. The deck is 4.3 m (14 ft) wide between the rails, surfaced with wooden planks, supported by timber crossbeams suspended from double wrought-iron chains, and is distinctly arched. At normal water levels there is 4.7 m (15 ft 5 in) clearance beneath the bridge.

It is about 1.1 miles (1.8 km) upstream from Ferriby Sluice and links the villages of Horkstow, east of the river, and Winterton on the west. A ferry had previously connected the villages, and it is believed a bridge had occupied the site from the 18th century, providing access to the brick-making kilns located on the Winterton side. Following a Principal Inspection carried out in the summer of 2025, Horkstow Bridge was assessed to be in an unsafe condition for vehicular and pedestrian use. Consequently, the bridge has been closed to all traffic until further notice. It is hoped that refurbishment and strengthening works will commence in early 2026 to restore the historic structure while retaining its original character.

Horkstow is one of "only a handful" of early suspension bridges in Britain to remain as originally designed, but it has not survived completely unscathed. In 1979, repairs were needed after the tractor unit of a 23-ton articulated lorry fell through into the river, destroying a quarter of the bridge deck and damaging the attached suspension rods, though the rest of the structure remained intact. In the 1990s, the bridge was strengthened – the deck relaid using a tropical hardwood timber to support a 5 t load and the underground parts of the suspension chains replaced with high-tensile bars – while retaining its appearance and functionality. The works earned engineers C Spencer Ltd a commendation in the 1999 Institution of Civil Engineers Historic Bridge Awards.

Although open to motor traffic, it is mostly used by ramblers, cyclists and anglers. It is owned by the Environment Agency, and in September 1979 was listed at Grade II*, a grading which covers "particularly important buildings of more than special interest". The site of the former brickyard is a Site of Nature Conservation Interest.

== Gallery ==
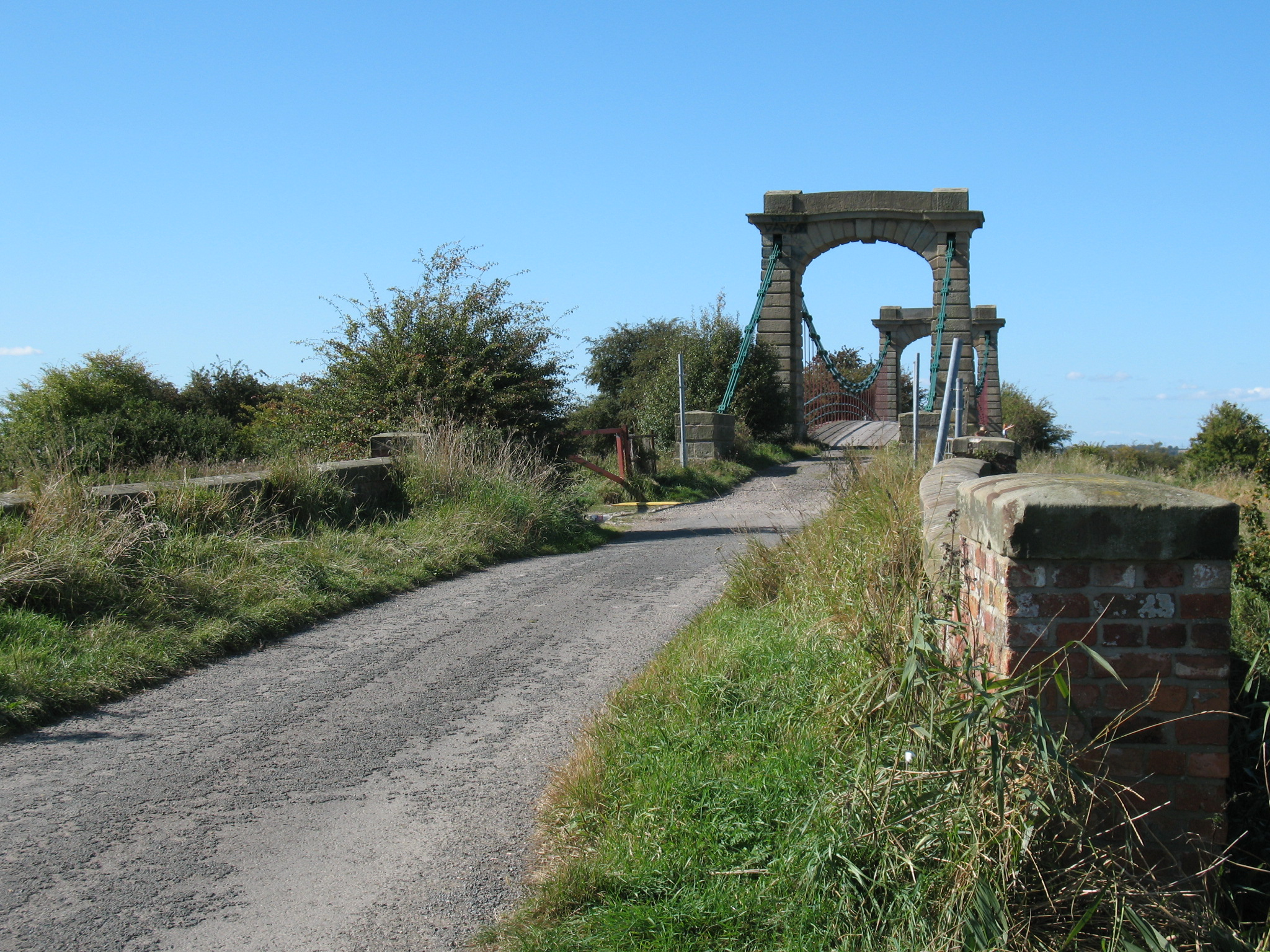
Approached via Bridge Lane from the east

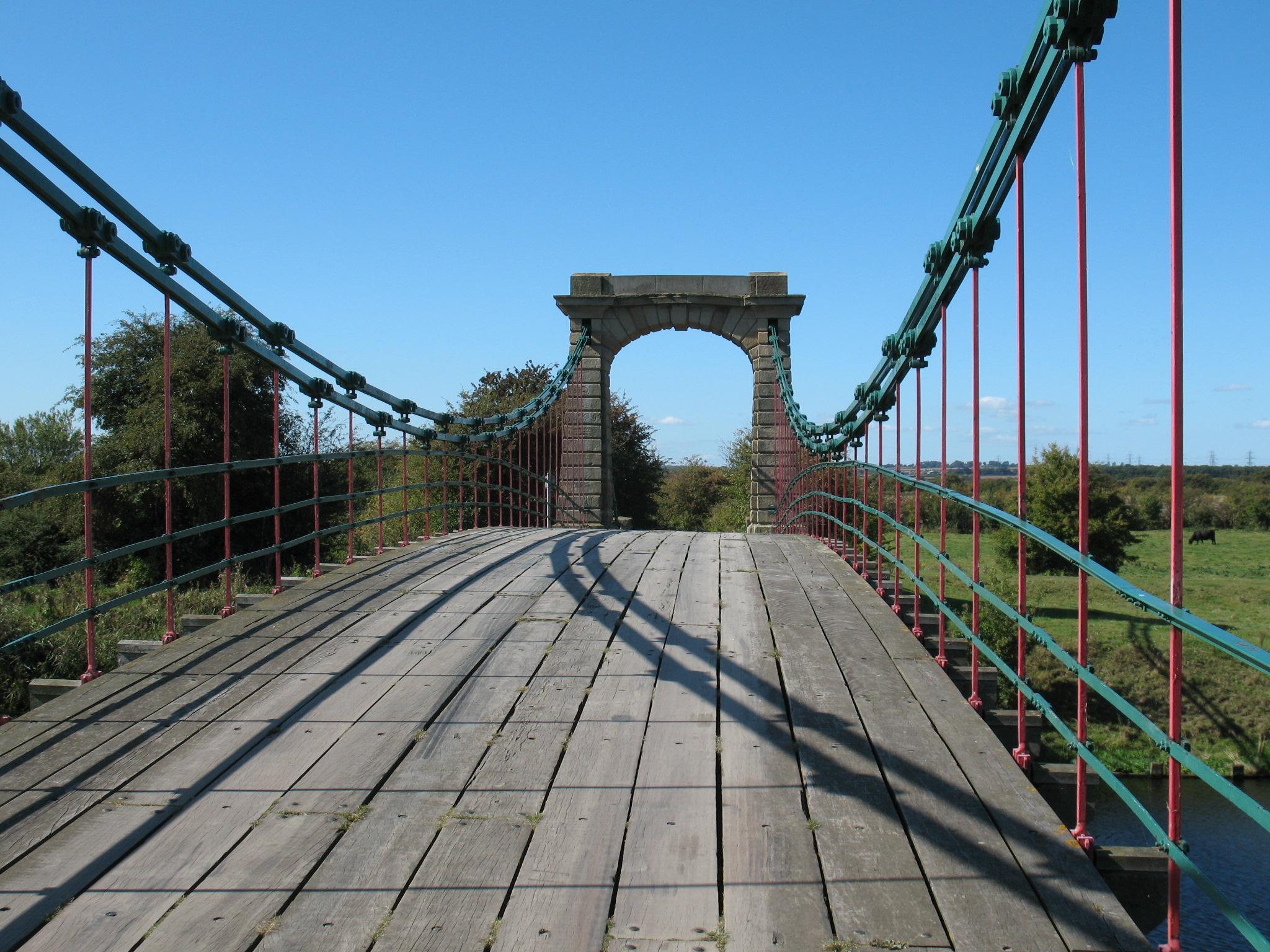
Deck and western arch

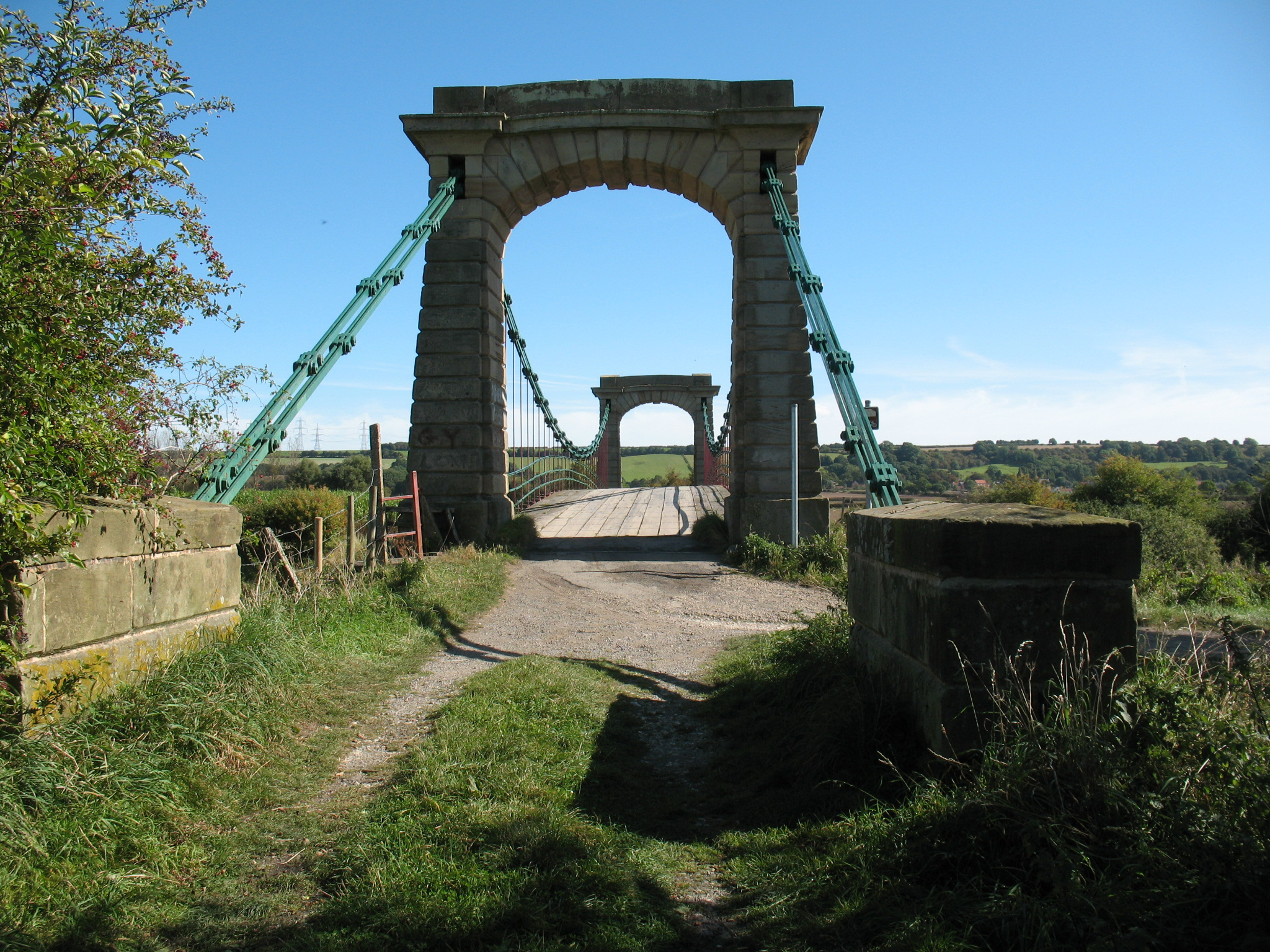
Approached from the west

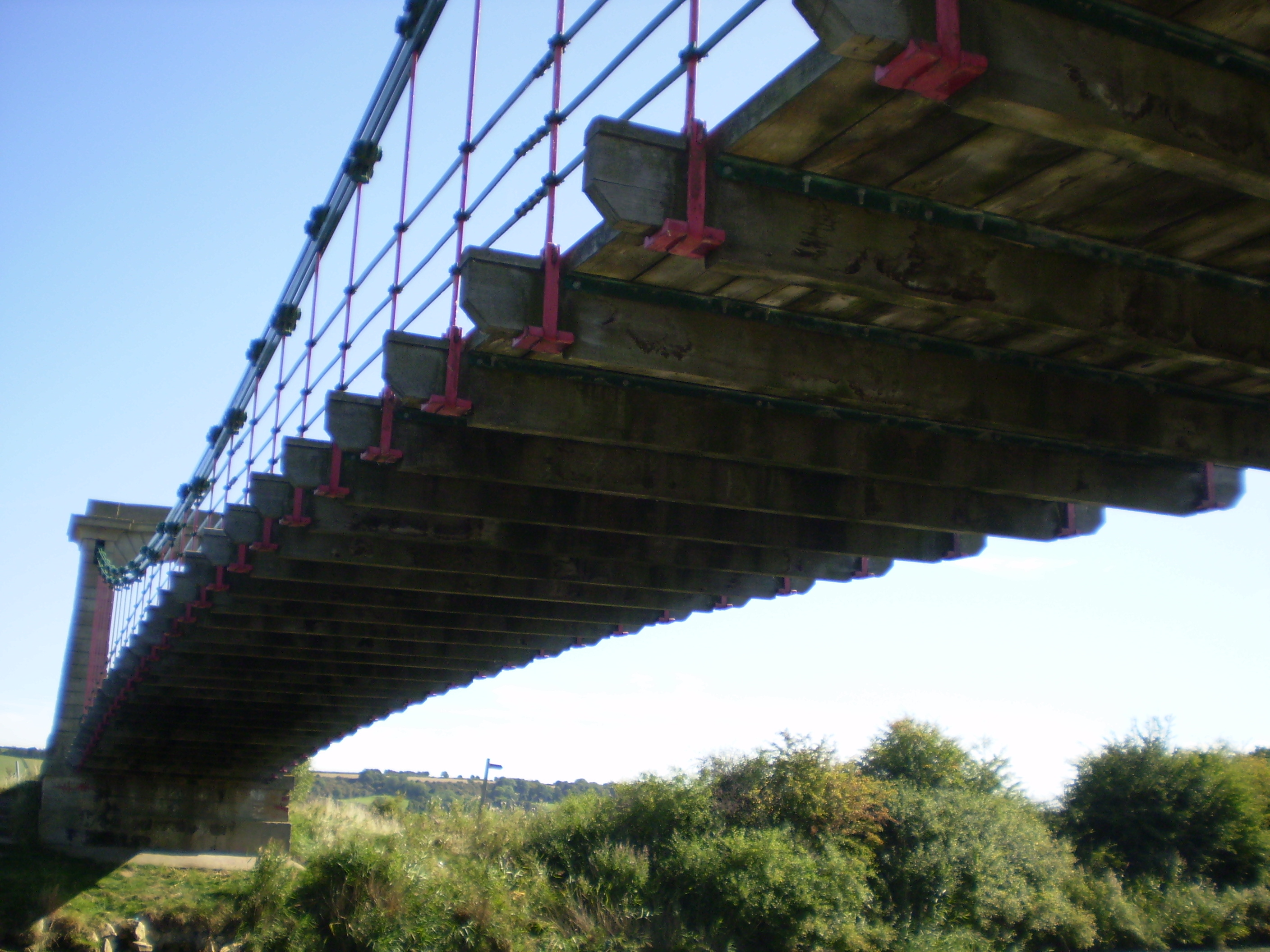
From beneath, showing crossbeams and hangers
