= No. 239 Squadron RAF =

Defunct flying squadron of the Royal Air Force

- Official squadron badge for No. 239 Squadron RAF
- Active: 20 August 1918 – 31 May 1919; 18 September 1940 – 1 July 1945
- Country: United Kingdom
- Branch: Royal Air Force
- Mottos: Latin: Exploramus ("We seek out")

Insignia
- Squadron Badge heraldry: A winged spur This was the first squadron to work with an armoured division, which included mechanised cavalry, with which the spur provided association
- Squadron Codes: HB (Sep 1940 – Sep 1943 and Jan 1945 – Jul 1945)

No. 239 Squadron RAF was an anti-submarine squadron of the Royal Air Force during World War I. During World War II the squadron performed as an army co-operation squadron and later as a night intruder unit. After the war the squadron was disbanded.

== History ==
=== Formation and World War I ===
No. 239 Squadron RAF was formed from No 418 (Coastal reconnaissance) Flight at Torquay, on 20 August 1918, and was equipped with the Short 184, flying anti-submarine patrols with them until the Armistice. The squadron either disbanded on 15 May 1919 or on 31 May 1919

=== World War II ===
On 18 September 1940, the squadron reformed at RAF Hatfield from a flight each of No. 16 and No. 225 squadrons. The squadron began with Westland Lysanders, and then later re-equipped with Curtiss Tomahawks and Hawker Hurricanes. The squadron converted to North American P-51 Mustangs in May 1942 and began ground attack and reconnaissance operations over Northern France, which lasted till August 1943, the squadron also taking part in the air cover during the Dieppe Raid.

In September 1943 the squadron moved to RAF Ayr to train as a night fighter unit, and re-equipped with the de Havilland Mosquito. It then moved to RAF West Raynham to join No. 100 (Bomber Support) Group, participating in night time operations against enemy fighters. On 27 October 1944 during fighter affiliation training with No. 49 Squadron RAF, a Mosquito piloted by F/Lt J.H.Roberts and accompanied by Flight Engineer Sgt. A.M.Ashcroft, stalled and crashed in Stapleford Woods, Lincolnshire, with the immediate death of both pilot and passenger.

The squadron disbanded on 1 July 1945.

== Aircraft operated ==
Aircraft operated by No. 239 Squadron RAF
From	To	Aircraft	Variant
Aug 1918	May 1919	Short 184	
Sep 1940	Mar 1941	Westland Lysander	Mk.II
Mar 1941	Jan 1942	Westland Lysander	Mk.IIIa
Jun 1941	May 1942	Curtiss Tomahawk	Mks.I & IIa
Jan 1942	May 1942	Hawker Hurricane	Mks.I & IIc
Jun 1942	Dec 1942	Fairey Battle	Mk.II
Mar 1942	Jul 1942	Miles Master	Mks.I & III
May 1942	Sep 1943	North American Mustang	Mk.I
Oct 1943	Jan 1944	Bristol Beaufighter	Mk.If
Dec 1943	Sep 1944	de Havilland Mosquito	Mk.II
Sep 1944	Jan 1945	de Havilland Mosquito	Mk.VI
Jan 1945	Jul 1945	de Havilland Mosquito	NF.30
