= Beckingham, Lincolnshire =

Village and civil parish in the North Kesteven district of Lincolnshire, England

Coordinates: 53.074042°N 0.694073°W

Beckingham
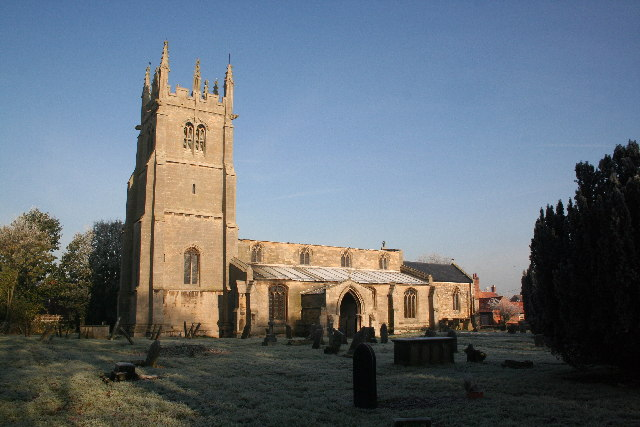
- All Saints' church Beckingham

- Location within Lincolnshire
- Population: 452 (2011)
- OS grid reference: SK875537
  - London: 110 mi (180 km) S
- District: North Kesteven
- Shire county: Lincolnshire
- Region: East Midlands
- Country: England
- Sovereign state: United Kingdom
- Post town: Lincoln
- Postcode district: LN5
- Police: Lincolnshire
- Fire: Lincolnshire
- Ambulance: East Midlands
- UK Parliament: Sleaford and North Hykeham

Beckingham is a village and civil parish in the North Kesteven district of Lincolnshire, England. The population of the civil parish (including Stapleford) at the 2011 census was 452. It is situated approximately 4 miles (6 km) east from Newark-on-Trent on the A17 road, and on the east bank of the River Witham.

Beckingham is largely a residential community with a village hall. The village public house is the Grade II listed Pack Horse Inn. Nearby to the west is Newark Golf Course.

It also is the home to beckingham training camp which trains the atc, navy cadets and army cadets in the area which is also the site of air cadets annual wing camp

== History ==
The Grade I listed parish church is dedicated to All Saints. It was restored in 1857, 1888, and 1889–90. The church was featured on the BBC TV programme Restoration in 2006, where it became a regional runner-up. Further listed buildings are The Old Smithy, Sutton Lane Farmhouse, Beckingham Hillside Cottages, Glebe Farmhouse, Apricot Hall, Rose Cottages, The Rectory, and Redvers House,

== Geography ==
In 1972 the village was bypassed by a dual-carriageway at a cost of £600,000. A contract taking 15 months was given in March 1971 for £247,178. The bypass was 1.25 miles long.

== Notable people ==
The Sheffield Tigers Speedway rider (1968 1972) - Brian Maxted.
