= Gelston, Lincolnshire =

Village in the South Kesteven district of Lincolnshire, England

Coordinates: 52.997254°N 0.641095°W

Gelston
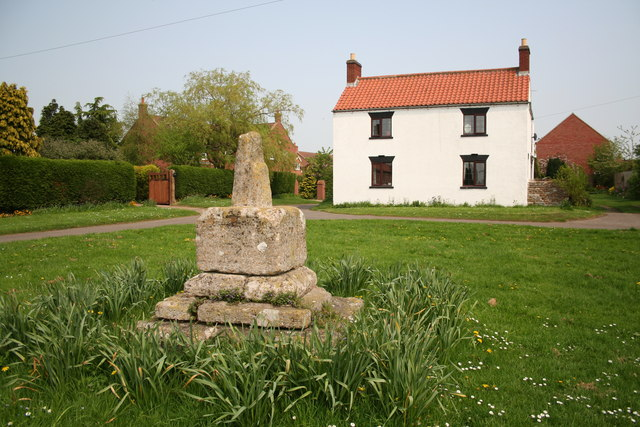
- 15th century cross, Gelston

- Location within Lincolnshire
- OS grid reference: SK913453
  - London: 105 mi (169 km) S
- Civil parish: Hough-on-the-Hill
- District: South Kesteven
- Shire county: Lincolnshire
- Region: East Midlands
- Country: England
- Sovereign state: United Kingdom
- Post town: GRANTHAM
- Postcode district: NG32
- Dialling code: 01400
- Police: Lincolnshire
- Fire: Lincolnshire
- Ambulance: East Midlands
- UK Parliament: Sleaford and North Hykeham

Gelston is a village in the South Kesteven district of Lincolnshire, England. It is 2 miles (3 km) west from the A607 road, 5 miles (8 km) north from Grantham, and in the civil parish of Hough-on-the-Hill, a village 1 mile (1.6 km) to the north-east.

The village is included in the ecclesiastical parish of Hough-on-the Hill, part of the Loveden Deanery of the Diocese of Lincoln.

== History ==
According to A Dictionary of British Place Names, Gelston could be "a farmstead or a village of a man called Gjofull" – 'Gels' from an Old Scandinavian person name and 'ton' Old English for "enclosure, farmstead, village, manor [or] estate".

Gelston is referred to in the 1086 Domesday account as "Chevelestune" in the manor of Hough-on-the-Hill, and in the Loveden Hundred of Kesteven. It had 26 households, 18 villagers, 6 smallholders and 2 freemen, with 16 ploughlands, a meadow of 146 acres (0.6 km^{2}) and a woodland of 200 acres (0.8 km^{2}). In 1066 Earl Ralph was Lord of the manor; after 1086 this transferred to Count Alan of Brittany, who also became Tenant-in-chief.

In 1885 Kelly's Directory noted: "at Gelston there is a place of worship for Wesleyan Methodists; and an ancient cross". The Wesleyan chapel was built in 1839, closed in 1958, and is now a private residence. The medieval limestone cross on the village green dates from the 15th century, is Grade II listed and is a scheduled ancient monument.
