= John Rennie the Younger =

British engineer (1794-1874)

John Rennie
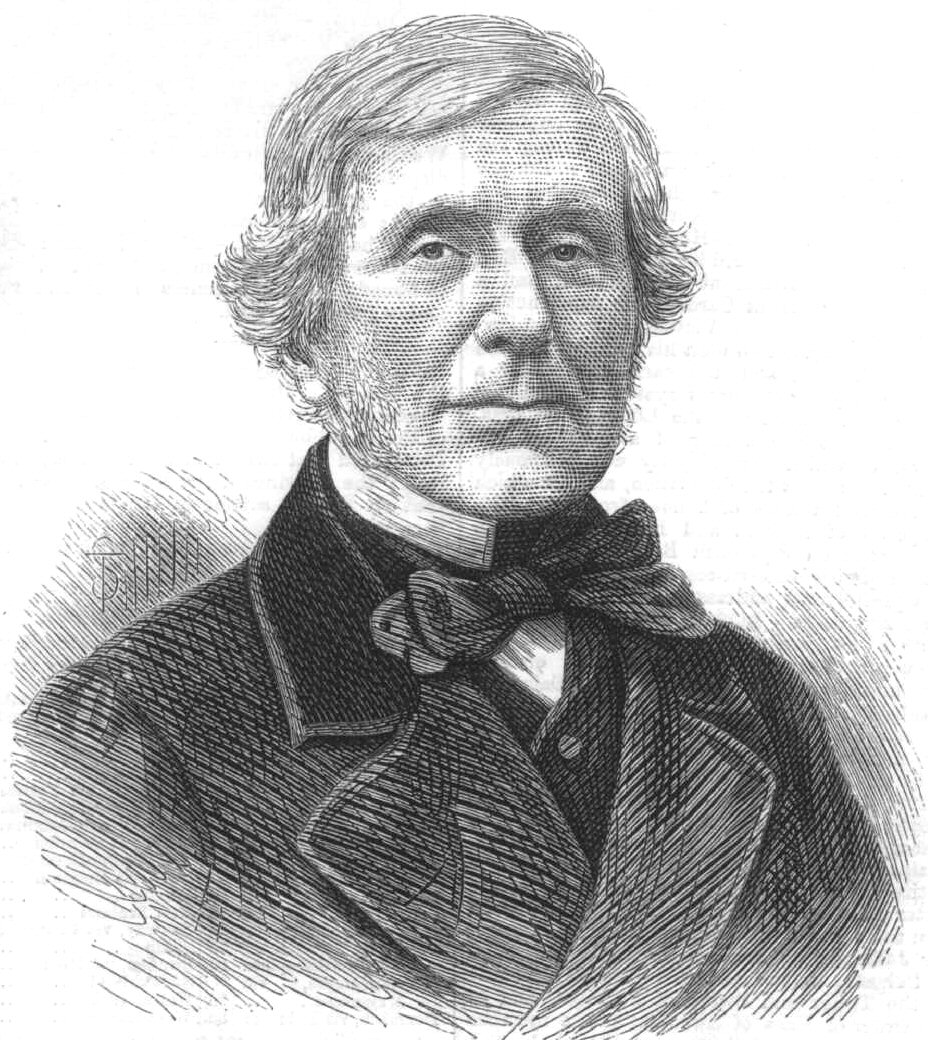
- John Rennie the Younger
- Born: 30 August 1794; Southwark, London, England, Kingdom of Great Britain
- Died: 3 September 1874 (aged 80); Bengeo, Hertfordshire, England, United Kingdom of Great Britain and Ireland
- Engineering career
- Discipline: Civil engineer
- Institutions: Institution of Civil Engineers (president)
- Projects: Waterloo Bridge Southwark Bridge London Bridge

Sir John Rennie FRSA (30 August 1794 – 3 September 1874) was a British engineer who was the second son of engineer John Rennie the Elder, and brother of George Rennie.

== Early life ==
John Rennie was born at 27 Stamford Street, Blackfriars Road, London, on 30 August 1794. He was educated by Dr. Greenlaw at Isleworth, and afterwards by Dr. Charles Burney at Greenwich. He subsequently entered his father's manufactory in Holland Street, Blackfriars Road, where he acquired a practical knowledge of his profession, and in 1813 he was placed under Mr. Hollingsworth, resident engineer of Waterloo Bridge, the foundations of which he personally superintended. In 1815 he assisted his father in the erection of Southwark Bridge, and in 1819 he went abroad for the purpose of studying the great engineering works on the continent.

== J. & G. Rennie ==
On the death of his father in 1821, John remained in partnership with his brother George, the civil engineering portion of the business being carried on by him, whereas the mechanical engineering was supervised by George.

== Royal William Victualling Yard ==
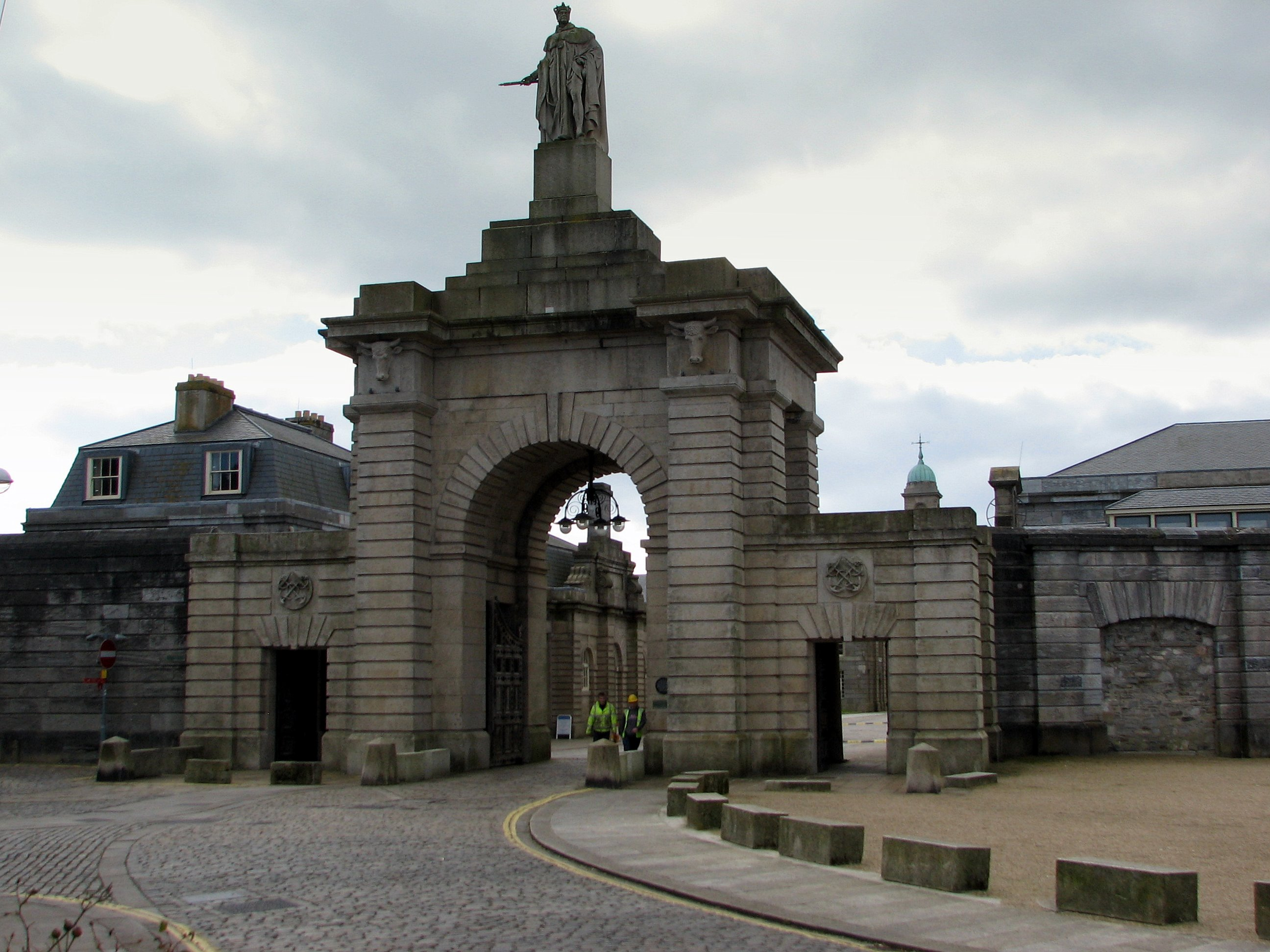
Royal William Victualling Yard, Stonehouse, 1825–33.

Rennie along with Philip Richards designed Royal William Victualling Yard, Plymouth, (1823–33). Covering 14 acres (57,000 m^{2}), this grand classical style ensemble built from Plymouth limestone and Dartmoor granite, consists of a grand gateway surmounted by a statue of King William IV. There is the Slaughterhouse, then around a central dock basin, to the south, Melville Square - a warehouse with a central courtyard - it has a clock tower over the main entrance; to the west of the basin is the Bakery with its mill and to the east the Brewery, with its cooperage.

== Cannon Workshops ==
Rennie also was responsible for designing Cannon Workshops, which arose following the strike by the coopers employed by the West India Dock Company. The company decided to reorganise the cooperage department, and Rennie drew up the plans, submitting them in 1824. The buildings were completed in 1825.

== Bridges and marine engineering ==
The most important of John Rennie's undertakings, from 1824, was the construction of London Bridge, the designs for which had been prepared by his father. The bridge was opened in 1831, when Rennie was knighted, being the first of the profession since Sir Hugh Myddleton to be thus distinguished. He was responsible for the New River Ancholme Drainage Scheme in Lincolnshire, and Horkstow Bridge, which he designed to cross the river at Horkstow in 1835–6, is one of the earliest suspension bridges to survive and remains substantially as designed. As engineer to the Admiralty, a post in which he succeeded his father, he completed various works at Sheerness, Woolwich, Plymouth, Ramsgate, and the great breakwater at Plymouth, of which he published an 'Account' in 1848. Many years of his life were spent in making additions and alterations to various harbours on different parts of the coast, both in England and in Ireland. One example would be his work in the 1850s designing a drydock for Joseph Wheeler at his Rushbrooke yard in Cork. He completed the drainage works in the Lincolnshire fens commenced by his father, and, in conjunction with Telford, constructed the Nene outfall near Wisbech (1826–1831). He also restored the harbour of Boston in 1827–8, and made various improvements on the Welland. He also re-modernised the Chatham Dockyards in 1862. Creating 3 huge basins and passageways.

== Railway engineering ==
Although Rennie and his brother were early in the field as a railway engineers – having been involved, with George Stephenson, in the design of the Liverpool and Manchester Railway – their practice in this department was not very large. The company did however supply a number of locomotives for the London and Croydon Railway in 1838 and 1839. In 1852 John laid out a system of railways for Sweden, for which he received the order of Gustavus Vasa, and in 1855 he designed a series of railways and harbours for Portugal, none of which were, however, carried out.

== Institution of Civil Engineers ==
Rennie was elected a member of the Institution of Civil Engineers on 25 June 1844, and he became president on 21 January 1845, retaining the office for three years. His presidential address in 1846 was a complete history of the profession of civil engineering. He also contributed papers on the drainage of the level of Ancholme, Lincolnshire, and on the improvement of the navigation of the Newry. He published, besides his Account of Plymouth Breakwater, (1848), the Theory, Formation, and Construction of British and Foreign Harbours (1851–54). He was elected a foreign member of the Royal Swedish Academy of Sciences.

== Retirement and death ==
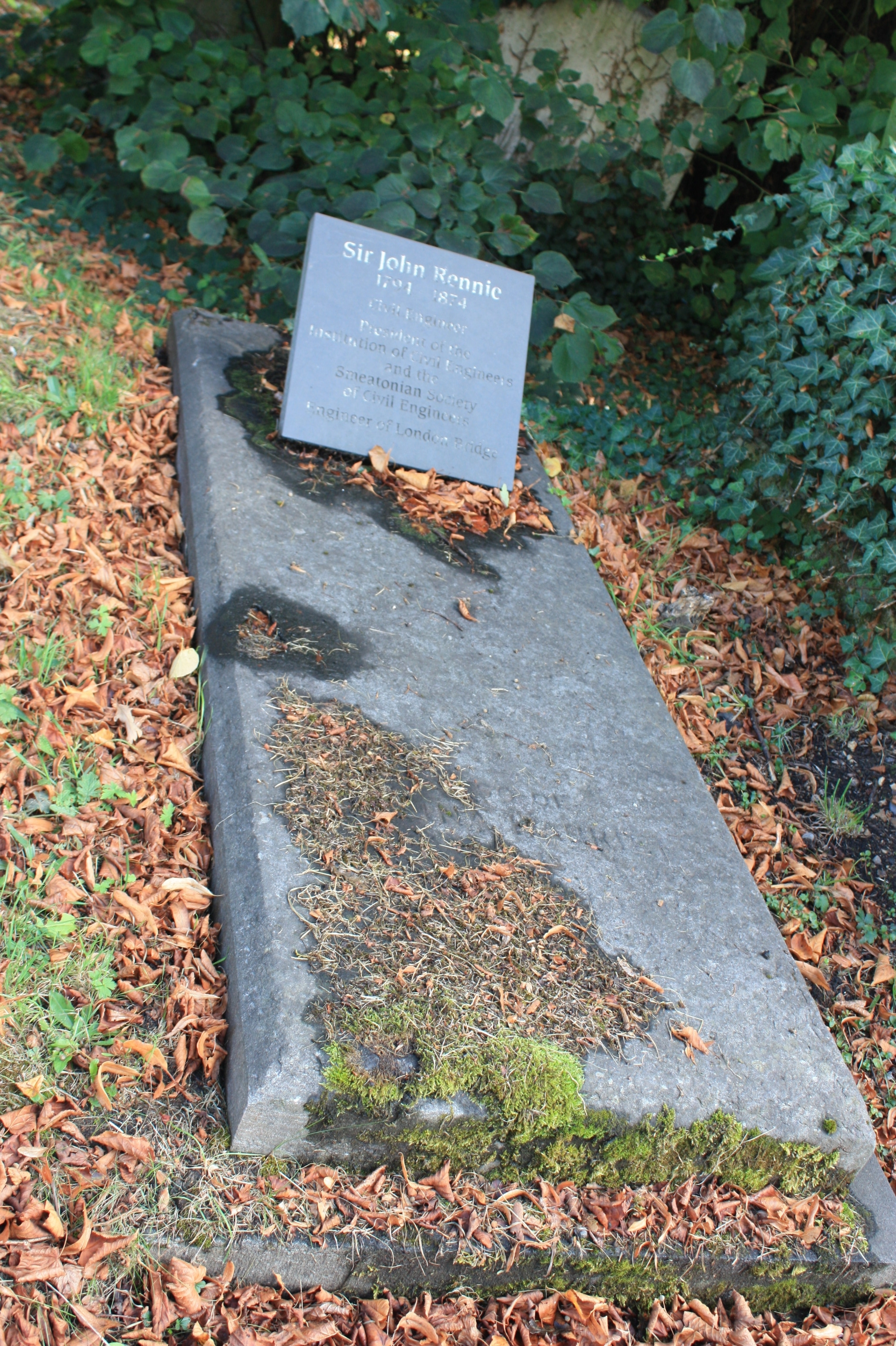
John Rennie's grave, Kensal Green Cemetery

Rennie retired from the active duties of his profession about 1862, and died at Bengeo, near Hertford, on 3 September 1874, just after his 80th birthday.

He is buried in Kensal Green Cemetery in London on the edge of a southern spur path. The grave has a new plaque to compensate for the original worn slab.

Professional and academic associations
Preceded by James Walker	President of the Institution of Civil Engineers; January 1845 – January 1848	Succeeded by Joshua Field
