= Stapleford, Lincolnshire =

Village and civil parish in North Kesteven district of Lincolnshire, England

Coordinates: 53.109119°N 0.683137°W

Stapleford
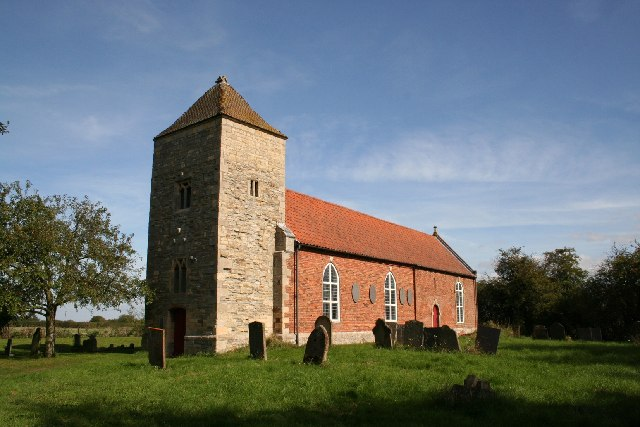
- All Saints' Church, Stapleford

- Location within Lincolnshire
- OS grid reference: SK882576
  - London: 115 mi (185 km) S
- District: North Kesteven
- Shire county: Lincolnshire
- Region: East Midlands
- Country: England
- Sovereign state: United Kingdom
- Post town: Lincoln
- Postcode district: LN6
- Police: Lincolnshire
- Fire: Lincolnshire
- Ambulance: East Midlands
- UK Parliament: Sleaford and North Hykeham

Stapleford is a village and civil parish in North Kesteven district of Lincolnshire, England, and about 6 miles (10 km) north-east from the town of Newark-on-Trent and 12 miles (19 km) south-west from the city of Lincoln. The population is included in the civil parish of Beckingham.

In the 1086 Domesday Book, Stapleford is listed as having 38 households and a church.

The Grade II listed parish church is dedicated to All Saints and dates from the 11th century, although it was rebuilt in 1770, and restored in 1903–04. In the churchyard is a Grade II listed and scheduled churchyard cross which dates from the 14th century, and is believed to stand in its original position.

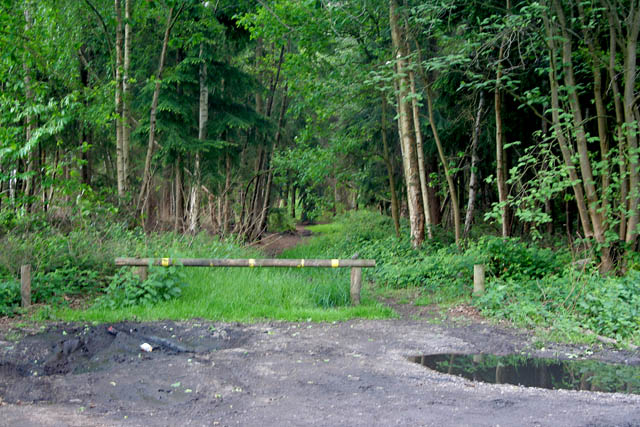
Stapleford Woods

Stapleford Woods are under the care of the Forestry Commission.

Stapleford CE School was built in 1867 as a National School. It was closed on 18 July 1984.

Samual Keetly was the pioneer of Stapleford Wood, planting the first trees on Stapleford Moor in 1785. His previous employment was at Wollaton Gardens. Before any trees were set, the land was turned with an iron plough, with planting taking him ten years to complete. He was a parishioner of Stapleford for 40 years, having brought his family to live there in 1787.
