= Brandon, Lincolnshire =

Village in South Lincolnshire, England

Coordinates: 53.02°N 00.65°W

Brandon
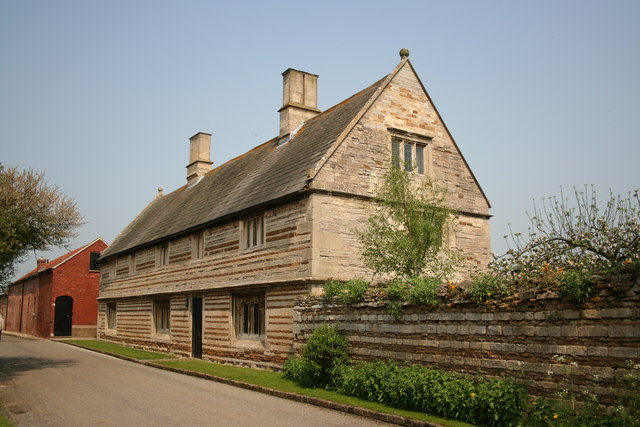
- Brandon Old Hall

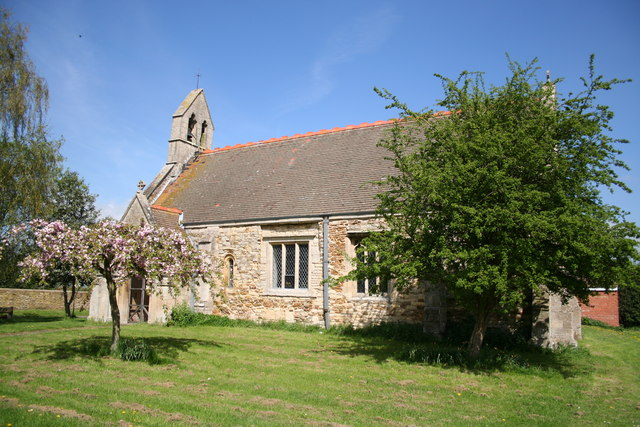
- Chapel of Ease, dedicated to St. John the Evangelist

- Location within Lincolnshire
- OS grid reference: SK904482
  - London: 107 mi (172 km) S
- District: South Kesteven
- Shire county: Lincolnshire
- Region: East Midlands
- Country: England
- Sovereign state: United Kingdom
- Post town: GRANTHAM
- Postcode district: NG32
- Dialling code: 01636
- Police: Lincolnshire
- Fire: Lincolnshire
- Ambulance: East Midlands
- UK Parliament: Grantham and Bourne

Brandon is a small village in South Kesteven, south Lincolnshire, England, part of the civil parish of Hough-on-the-Hill (where the population is listed).

The village is also part of the ecclesiastical parish of Hough on the Hill, part of the Loveden Deanery of the Diocese of Lincoln. There is a chapel of ease dedicated to St John the Evangelist, linked to the main church at Hough.

== Geography ==
It is situated between Stubton and Caythorpe, just west of the River Brant, from which the village gets its name. The East Coast Main Line is just over 1 mile (1.6 km) to the south-west.

The village's placename is likely derived in part from the name of the river, and thus means "hill by the River Brant". The placename is thus composed of two Old English elements: brant (meaning "steep", "deep") and dūn (meaning "hill").

== History ==
A notable building is Brandon Old Hall, built in the 16th century. Built of coursed dark gold bands of ironstone, light gold bands of ironstone, narrow bands of blue lias with limestone ashlar dressings. The garden is walled in the same unique style.

Medieval earthworks of a toft (homestead with land), a hollow way and some boundaries have been identified around the existing village.

The church, or chapel, was restored in 1872 by Kirk of Sleaford. It includes fragments of Saxon stonework whose origin is uncertain, and a Norman door. The style is Early English with Decorated and Perpendicular features.

== Businesses ==
A racing circuit (PF International) designed for single-seat karts is 1 mile to the north. British, European and Karting World Championship were held there.
