= Wainfleet St Mary =

Village and civil parish in the East Lindsey district of Lincolnshire, England

Coordinates: 53.109278°N 0.193211°E

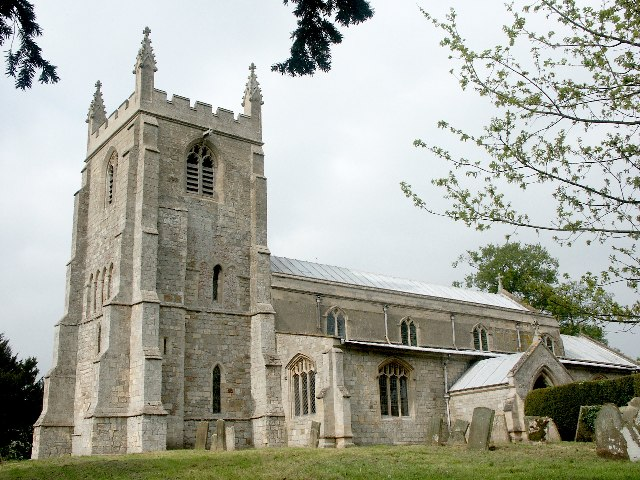
- Wainfleet St Mary Church

- Location within Lincolnshire
- Population: 1,025 (2011)
- OS grid reference: TF469591
  - London: 110 mi (180 km) S
- Civil parish: Skegness
- District: East Lindsey
- Shire county: Lincolnshire
- Region: East Midlands
- Country: England
- Sovereign state: United Kingdom
- Post town: Skegness
- Postcode district: PE24
- Dialling code: 01754
- Police: Lincolnshire
- Fire: Lincolnshire
- Ambulance: East Midlands
- UK Parliament: Boston and Skegness

Wainfleet St Mary is a village and civil parish in the East Lindsey district of Lincolnshire, England. It is situated directly south of Wainfleet All Saints on the A52 road, 5 miles (8 km) south-west from Skegness and 14 miles (23 km) north-east from Boston. The 2001 Census recorded a population of 1,106, reducing to 1,025 at the 2011 census. It includes the hamlet of Wainfleet Bank.

== History ==
The name "Wainfleet" is derived from Wegn fleot, a stream that can be crossed by a wagon (compare with 'wainwright', a maker of wagons).

The first mention of Wainfleet St Mary as a separate and distinct place from Wainfleet All Saints, is in 1378 when it belonged to the Priory of Stixwould.

The limestone Grade II listed church is dedicated to Saint Mary and dates from the 12th century, being restored in 1875 and 1892. The western tower dates from the 12th century although it was raised in the 15th century. Inside is a 15th-century font and a black and white marble monument, with broken pediment, to Edward Barkham who died in 1724. One hundred yards (91 m) south of the nave is the remains of a 14th-century stone cross, which is both a scheduled monument and Grade II listed.

There is a Grade II listed windmill at Mill Garage built of red brick in the early 19th century. It ceased working in 1947 and has been converted into a house.

Within the garden of Pinfold Lodge, lying at the junction of Vicarage Road and Low Road, is a brick-built octagonal pinfold roofed with slate. It is Grade II listed and thought to date back to approximately 1800.

Wainfleet St Mary C of E Primary School originated in the Bethlehem Hospital School, built in 1831. It was known as Wainfleet St Mary Church School by 1903, and as Wainfleet St Mary C of E School by 1913 and until 1981. The school was closed in 1987.

== Population ==
Population of Wainfleet St Mary Civil Parish
Year	1801	1811	1821	1831	1841	1851	1881	1891	1901	1911	1921	1931	1961	2001
Population	421	475	544	660	731	717	705	718	669	789	908	958	1,038	1,106

== Geography ==
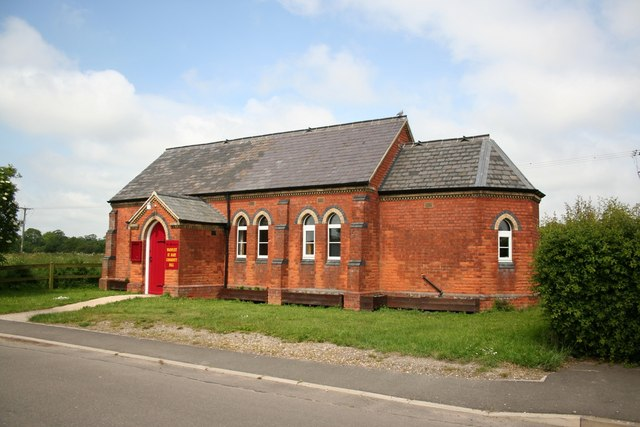
Wainfleet St.Mary Community Hall - Also known as St Michael's Chapel
