= Great Sturton =

Hamlet and civil parish in the East Lindsey district of Lincolnshire, England

Coordinates: 53.273426°N 0.178396°W

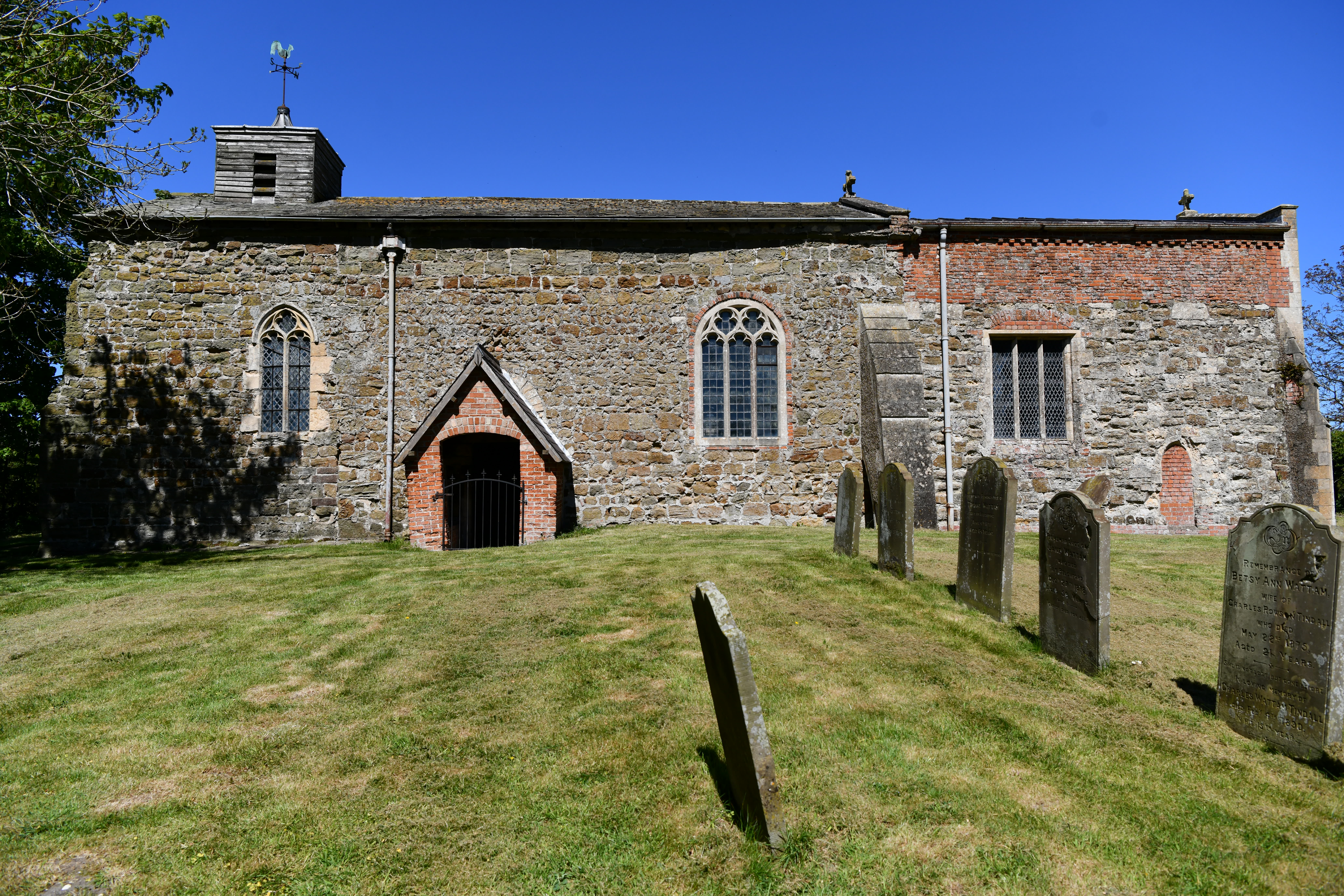
- All Saints' Church, Great Sturton

- Location within Lincolnshire
- OS grid reference: TF215767
  - London: 120 mi (190 km) S
- District: East Lindsey
- Shire county: Lincolnshire
- Region: East Midlands
- Country: England
- Sovereign state: United Kingdom
- Post town: Horncastle
- Postcode district: LN9
- Police: Lincolnshire
- Fire: Lincolnshire
- Ambulance: East Midlands
- UK Parliament: Louth and Horncastle

Great Sturton is a hamlet and civil parish in the East Lindsey district of Lincolnshire, England. It is situated approximately 7 miles (11 km) from the market town of Horncastle.

The hamlet has twelve houses and fewer than 40 residents. Neighbouring villages are Sotby, Baumber, Hatton and Ranby.

Great Sturton church is dedicated to All Saints, and is a Grade II* listed building dating from the 11th century. It was restored in 1904 by T. J. Micklethwaite.

Both a middle and a late Bronze Age spearhead were found at Great Sturton.

There are two deserted medieval villages (DMV) listed for Great Sturton; one was Sudtone, the other the hamlet of Lowthorpe.

== Sturton Hall ==
The first Sturton Hall is a Grade II listed ruin. The house was deserted in 1810 when the Livesey family bought the manor and built a new Hall in Sturton Park. The Manor, with neighbouring Baumber, once belonged to Thomas Dighton whose daughter and Heiress married Edward Clinton, the second son of the first Earl of Lincoln, whose successors were the Dukes of Newcastle. These estates remained in the family until they were sold to Thomas Livesey of Blackburn, Lancashire.
