= Sotby =

Village and civil parish in the East Lindsey district of Lincolnshire, England

Coordinates: 53.293316°N 0.193124°W

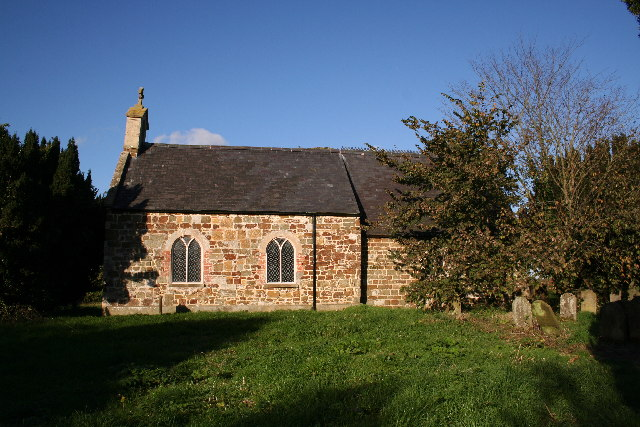
- St Peter's Church, Sotby

- Location within Lincolnshire
- Population: 62 (2001)
- OS grid reference: TF205788
  - London: 125 mi (201 km) S
- District: East Lindsey
- Shire county: Lincolnshire
- Region: East Midlands
- Country: England
- Sovereign state: United Kingdom
- Post town: Market Rasen
- Postcode district: LN8
- Dialling code: 01507, some 01673
- Police: Lincolnshire
- Fire: Lincolnshire
- Ambulance: East Midlands
- UK Parliament: East Lindsey

Sotby is a village and civil parish in the East Lindsey district of Lincolnshire, England. It is situated 15 miles (24 km) north-east from the city and county town of Lincoln, midway between the market towns of Horncastle, to the south, and Market Rasen, to the north. As the population of the village remains less than 100 it is now included in the civil parish of Market Stainton.

The parish church is a Grade II* listed building dedicated to Saint Peter. It dates from the 12th century, and was restored in 1857 by Michael Drury, using greenstone, limestone and some red brick. There is a gravestone in the chancel floor to John Porter, rector, who died 1688.
