= Hough-on-the-Hill =

Village and civil parish in the South Kesteven district of Lincolnshire, England

Coordinates: 53.0075°N 0.6212°W

Hough on the Hill
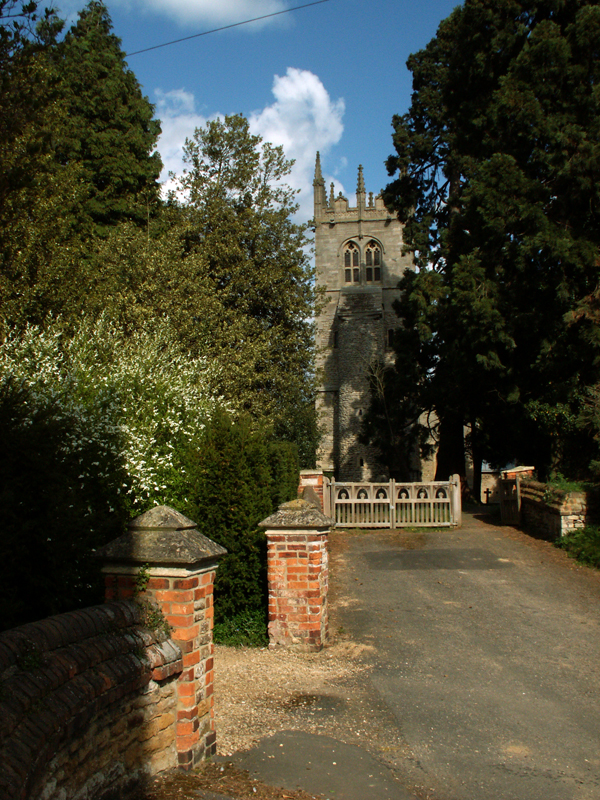
- All Saints' Church, Hough-on-the-Hill, with its circular Saxon stair tower in front

- Location within Lincolnshire
- Population: 399 (2011)
- OS grid reference: SK9246
  - London: 105 mi (169 km) S
- District: South Kesteven
- Shire county: Lincolnshire
- Region: East Midlands
- Country: England
- Sovereign state: United Kingdom
- Post town: GRANTHAM
- Postcode district: NG32
- Dialling code: 01400
- Police: Lincolnshire
- Fire: Lincolnshire
- Ambulance: East Midlands
- UK Parliament: Grantham and Bourne

Hough-on-the-Hill is a village and civil parish in the South Kesteven district of Lincolnshire, England. The population of the civil parish including Brandon was 399 at the 2011 census. It is situated approximately 7 miles (11 km) due north from the market town of Grantham. The hamlets of Gelston and Brandon are part of the parish. Hough-on-the-Hill is on a significant rise, hence the name.

== History ==
The name Hough is Old English "haga", or 'enclosure'.

The village is listed in the Domesday Book of 1086 as "Hag" and "Hache", comprising 45 households, four mills and a church. It is not clear when the 'le Hill' or 'on the Hill' suffix was added.

An extensive Anglo-Saxon cemetery including both burials and cremations has been excavated on Lovedon Hill.

There was also a medieval motte-and-bailey castle situated on a natural mound, known as Castle Hill, on which the church of All Saints was later built. It is an ancient scheduled monument.

Hough Priory was located here, dependent on the Augustinian Abbey of Notre Dame du Voeu in Cherbourg; it was founded about 1164 and dissolved in about 1414. In 1432 it was granted to the Carthusian order of Mountgrace. There are no remains.

== Landmarks ==
The Grade I listed church, which is dedicated to All Saints, is built of ironstone and limestone and dates back to the 11th century. It was restored in 1845. It contains monuments to the Payne family and is notable for its Saxon tower with an unusual circular stairway. The top storey of the tower was added during the 15th century.

The post office is a Grade II listed 17th-century shop with house attached, built of ironstone and red brick.

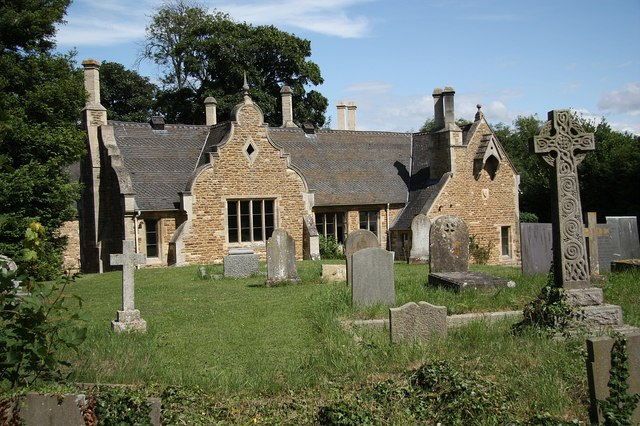
Schoolhouse

The Grade II listed Brownlow Arms public house was built in 1852 of ironstone and limestone.

The old school and schoolhouse were built in 1867 on the site of the medieval castle but they are outside of the present scheduled area.
