= Carlton-le-Moorland =

Village in North Kesteven district, Lincolnshire, England

Coordinates: 53.116667°N 0.65°W

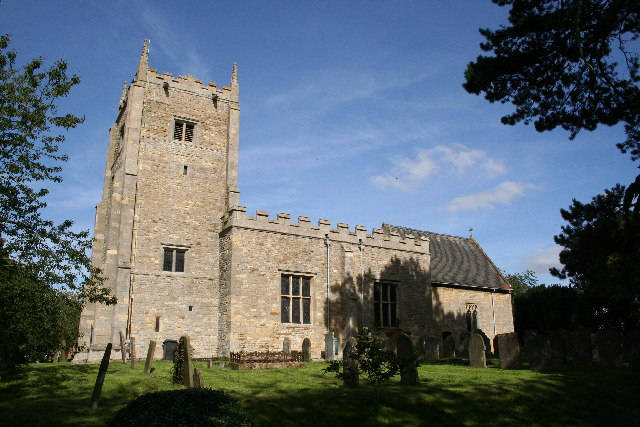
- Church of St Mary, Carlton-le-Moorland

- Location within Lincolnshire
- Population: 565 (2011)
- OS grid reference: SK906581
  - London: 110 mi (180 km) S
- District: North Kesteven
- Shire county: Lincolnshire
- Region: East Midlands
- Country: England
- Sovereign state: United Kingdom
- Post town: Lincoln
- Postcode district: LN5
- Police: Lincolnshire
- Fire: Lincolnshire
- Ambulance: East Midlands
- UK Parliament: Sleaford and North Hykeham

Carlton-le-Moorland, is a village and civil parish in the North Kesteven district of Lincolnshire, England, between Newark-on-Trent and Lincoln. The parish had a population at the 2011 census of 565.

== Heritage ==
Carlton-le-Moorland is listed in the Domesday Book as having of 29 households, 255 acres (1.0 km^{2}) of meadow, and a church.

The parish church is a Grade I listed building dedicated to Saint Mary. It dates from the 11th century, but the nave and tower were rebuilt in the late 16th century. It was restored in 1890–1891 by C. Hodgson Fowler. The font is from the 12th century. Outside, the Grade II listed lychgate was installed in 1918 as a war memorial.

St Lazarus Hospital, a leper colony in Carlton-le-Moorland founded before 1180, was maintained by the Order of Saint Lazarus. It is not known when it closed. According to England and the Crusades, 1095–1588, Nigel of Amundeville gave land at Carlton-le-Moorland to the brethren of the Order of Burton Lazars about 1242, probably because some of his family suffered from leprosy. His father, Ralf, had given land in 1180 for the same purpose, as did his brother Elias, whose own daughter was a sufferer.

The Knights Templar and a monastic order owned lands in and around the parish in the Middle Ages. Eventually the Disney family, with its main branch in Norton Disney, acquired the local estates that had been monastic holdings in the 16th century. There are Disneys buried in the church. There used also to be a manor house opposite the church, where the Disneys lived before moving to Somerton Castle.

== Amenities ==
The parish council owns the village hall, the playing fields, and "The Sands", an area of amenity land and allotments. Over the last couple of decades, the village has undergone some housing development. It has a pub called the White Hart.
