= Ferriby Sluice =

Hamlet in Lincolnshire, England

Coordinates: 53.676°N 0.520°W

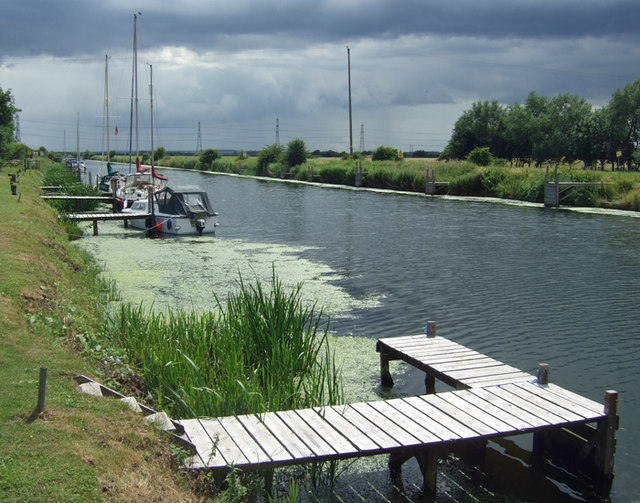
Yachts moored on the new Ancholme at Ferriby Sluice

Ferriby Sluice is a hamlet situated near the lock complex on the Humber and River Ancholme, Lincolnshire, England. It is now part of the village of South Ferriby but once stood alone in its own right. It is situated west of South Ferriby, physically separated from the bulk of the village, and once was the point of departure for the packet boats that used to ply the Humber.
