= Brant Broughton and Stragglethorpe =

Civil parish in Lincolnshire, England

Coordinates: 53.078°N 0.633°W

- Civil parish
- St Helen's church, Brant Broughton St Michael's church, Stragglethorpe

- Location within Lincolnshire
- Interactive map of Brant Broughton and Stragglethorpe
- Area: 5.8 sq mi (15 km^{2})
- Population: 785 (2021)
  - Density: 135/sq mi (52/km^{2})
- OS grid reference: SK917542
  - London: 110 mi (180 km) S
- District: North Kesteven
- Shire county: Lincolnshire
- Region: East Midlands
- Country: England
- Sovereign state: United Kingdom
- Settlements: Brant Broughton; Stragglethorpe
- Post town: LINCOLN
- Postcode district: LN5
- Dialling code: 01400
- Police: Lincolnshire
- Fire: Lincolnshire
- Ambulance: East Midlands
- UK Parliament: Sleaford and North Hykeham
- Website: brant-broughton-stragglethorpe.parish.lincolnshire.gov.uk

Brant Broughton and Stragglethorpe is a civil parish in the North Kesteven district of Lincolnshire, England. It lies approximately 8 miles (13 km) east of Newark-on-Trent, 12 miles (19 km) north-west of Sleaford and 12 miles (19 km) south of Lincoln, just north of the A17 road. The parish comprises the villages of Brant Broughton and Stragglethorpe. At the 2021 census it had a population of 785.

== Geography ==
The parish occupies low-lying land in the valley of the River Brant, which flows to the east of Brant Broughton. The landscape is predominantly agricultural, with the two villages linked by minor roads. Brant Broughton is the larger settlement and contains a conservation area.

== History ==
The settlement of Brant Broughton has Anglo-Saxon origins and continuous occupation. Medieval ridge-and-furrow earthworks survive in places, and watching briefs have recovered medieval pottery and structural features. Stragglethorpe shows evidence of medieval and later occupation linked to its role as an outlying settlement.

Brant Broughton is recorded in the Domesday Book of 1086 as a substantial manor (with associated sokeland) containing at least eighteen carucates of land, a church, a priest and a mill; the recorded population included 36 villeins, 9 bordars and 15 sokemen. The name is generally interpreted as “fortified settlement (or farmstead) on the River Brant”. Stragglethorpe, whose name incorporates the Old Danish element thorpe for secondary settlement, is first clearly documented in the 13th century and was historically a dependent chapelry associated with Beckingham.

The two ancient parishes were merged on 1 April 1931 to form the present civil parish of Brant Broughton and Stragglethorpe.

== Governance ==
The parish is administered by Brant Broughton and Stragglethorpe Parish Council. It forms part of the Navenby and Brant Broughton electoral ward and the Sleaford and North Hykeham parliamentary constituency. Historically both settlements lay in the Loveden Wapentake in the Parts of Kesteven.

== Demographics ==
The 2021 census recorded a population of 785. Earlier figures were 639 (2001) and 744 (2011). The population is predominantly White British and rural in character.

== Economy ==
The local economy is primarily agricultural. Limited local services and small businesses serve the villages including a public house, holiday lets and campsite; residents travel to Newark, Sleaford or Lincoln for most shopping, employment and secondary education.

== Community ==
Community facilities include the two parish churches, the Quaker Meeting House, village halls (including the Jubilee Hall in Brant Broughton), post office, playing fields, holiday lets and public house. Residents use amenities in nearby larger settlements for secondary schooling, healthcare and most shopping. Events include church activities such as Christmas celebrations.

== Landmarks ==
The parish contains 44 listed buildings:

- Church of St Helen, Brant Broughton (Grade I) – notable for its elegant spire (approximately 170 ft / 52 m high). The church has Early English and Perpendicular features and was restored by G. F. Bodley in 1873–76.
- Church of St Michael, Stragglethorpe (Grade I) – an 11th-century church with later alterations, now in the care of the Churches Conservation Trust; it retains an early font and 18th-century box pews.
- Brant Broughton Quaker Meeting House and attached stable (Grade II*) – a rare early-18th-century meeting house converted from a late-17th-century barn and cottage, retaining original furnishings.
- Stragglethorpe Hall (Grade II) – a 16th-century H-plan country house, extended in the early 20th century, together with its listed stable block.
- Other Grade II listed structures include almshouses, farmhouses, cottages, the former school, and various agricultural buildings within Brant Broughton Conservation Area.

== Transport ==
The parish is served by minor roads linking to the A17. There is no railway station; the nearest stations are at Newark North Gate or Sleaford. Limited bus services connect the villages to surrounding towns.

== Education ==
The Church of England and Methodist Primary School is at Brant Broughton.

== Religious sites ==
Church of St Helen is at Brant Broughton and dates from Early English period. The Church of St Michael is in Stragglethorpe and is from the 11th-century.

== Sport ==
There is a playing field and sports pavilion to the north of Brant Broughton.

== Notable people ==
- William Warburton (1698 – 1779) , Bishop of Gloucester
- Earle baronets, of Stragglethorpe
