= Thomas Earle =

Thomas Earle may refer to:

- Thomas Earle (American politician), American journalist and politician
- Thomas Earle (Canadian politician) (1837–1911), Canadian businessman and Conservative politician
- Thomas Earle (MP) (c. 1629–1696), English merchant and politician
- Thomas Earle (sculptor) (1810–1876), British sculptor
- Tom Earle (born 1966), Canadian author and teacher
- Thomas Earle (slave trader) (1754–1822), Liverpool slave trader

== See also ==
- Thomas Erle (disambiguation)
