= Hardman Earle =

English railway director and slaveholder (1792–1877)

Sir Hardman Earle, 1st Baronet
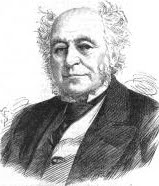
- Born: July 11, 1792
- Died: January 25, 1877 (aged 84)
- Known for: British businessman

Sir Hardman Earle, 1st Baronet (11 July 1792 – 25 January 1877) was a British businessman, railway director and slave owner.

Earle was a partner in several cotton trading enterprises and owned slaves in Antigua until slavery was abolished.

Sir Hardman was best known for his investment and business dealings in the railway industry, he was a director from the 1830s until his death, being primarily associated with the London and North Western Railway.

== Early life ==
Earle was born on 11 July 1792. He was the fourth son of the slave trader, Thomas Earle.

Earle attended school in Warrington before attending Charterhouse School, then located in Charterhouse Square, London.

== Cotton trading and other business ==
In 1812, Earle became a partner in a Liverpool cotton broking business, Salisbury Turner & Earle, where he was responsible for all cotton trading. In 1822 he joined the seed-crushing business of Earles & Carter as a partner, together with his older brother William Earle, this firm became Earles and King and was effectively the 'family business'.

Salisbury Turner & Earle was a founder member of the Liverpool Cotton Brokers' Association, now the International Cotton Association, and Earle served as president in 1849. (Note: It is possible that this was his son Hardman junior, but the date makes the older man far more likely.)

Earle was a founding director of Martins Bank which started trading as 'The Bank of Liverpool' in 1831. He was chairman of the board from 1858 to 1861.

== Slavery ==
His family were steeped in the slave trade, his father, Thomas Earle, grandfather William Earle and great-grandfather John Earle all having been slave traders.

In 1833, slave ownership was abolished in the British colonies and with the Slave Compensation Act 1837, the British Government compensated the owners who were forced to free enslaved people.

Hardman Earle was awarded £19,000, around £2.5m in 2020 money, in compensation; the former captives were not awarded anything.

He received compensation for freeing enslaved people on the following Antiguan plantations: Lynch's Estate, Blizards, Bodkin's (St Paul), Thibou's Estate, Gunthorpe's (St Georges) and Manning's Estate. (Note: The Newton Heritage Trail notes that "he owned plantations and slaves in what is now Guyana" but all the compensation records are for plantations on Antigua.)

== Railway director ==
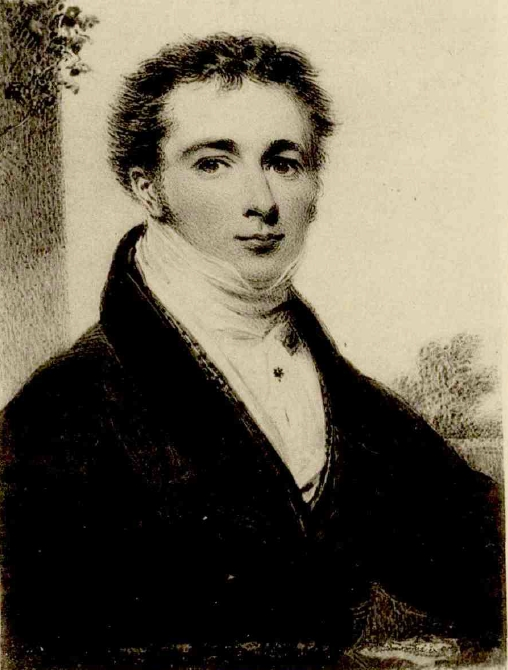
Sir Hardman Earle, 1st Baronet

Earle was best known as a railway investor and executive.

He had previously been an investor and proprietor of the Mersey and Irwell Navigation and opposed the building of railways, he was a witness against Liverpool and Manchester Railway's (L&MR) enabling Act as it was proceeding through Parliament.

He changed his mind and invested in the planned L&MR joining his relative Charles Lawrence as one of the initial directors of the company. A family legend claimed that he made the investment after personally walking the entire route to assess its prospects.

In 1833 the Grand Junction Railway (GJR) was authorised and Earle was one of the incorporated proprietors named in the Act, he became a director at the first meeting of the company.

The L&MR and the GJR merged under the GJR name in 1845. The enlarged GJR then amalgamated with the London and Birmingham Railway (L&BR) in 1846 to become the London and North Western Railway (L&NWR) during all these amalgamations Earle remained a director becoming one the first directors of the L&NWR.

He was a director of the Preston and Wigan Railway and took part in the negotiations between it and the Wigan Branch Railway when they decided to amalgamate in 1833 and become the North Union Railway (NUR) of which he became a director. The NUR was first leased by and subsequently became part of the L&NWR.

He remained an active member of the L&NWR board of directors until his death, when he was thought to be the oldest such official in the UK. He was a senior and experienced director, but didn't always get his own way, he suffered defeat in his 1857 campaign to protect the position of his former Grand Junction colleague Francis Trevithick.

The L&NWR named a locomotive after him, LNWR Precedent Class 2-4-0 number 890, built in 1877, the locomotive was 'renewed' as a LNWR Improved Precedent Class in 1895 and remained in service until 1928.

== Religion and politics ==
Earle served as a churchwarden in the Liverpool parishes of St Peter's and St Nicholas and as a Liverpool JP.

Earle, and most of his family, were Whigs which became the Liberal Party (UK) in the 1850s. He unsuccessfully stood for election as a Liverpool town councillor in 1837. In 1869, he was awarded a baronetcy for his services to the Liberal Party.

== Earlestown ==
Earlestown in Newton-le-Willows is named after him, in 1853 the L&NWR leased the Viaduct Foundry from Jones & Potts who had ceased trading in 1852, subsequently purchasing the site outright in 1860, it became the Earlestown wagon works. (Note: The works were originally the Earlestown carriage and wagon works but carriage manufacturing was transferred to Saltney in 1860 and wagon manufacturing and repair work was centralised at Earlestown.)

In 1855 the works and the new town that sprang up next to it was named Earlestown in his honour as he had been instrumental in setting up the works. (Note: The works eventually grew to 36 acres and employed 2,000, the railway company itself built 340 houses.)

== Allerton Tower ==
Earle bought part of the Allerton Hall estate and built a mansion called Allerton Tower. The mansion was of classic Italianate style, designed by Harvey Lonsdale Elmes, with a tower providing a view of the surrounding countryside, it was completed in 1849.

The tower was demolished in 1937. The lodge, stables, former laundry and part of the orangery remain. The locality was acquired by Liverpool Corporation in 1924 and has now become Allerton Towers Park.

== Personal life ==
Earle married Mary Langton of Kirkham on 24 August 1819.

They had four sons and six daughters:

- Thomas Earle (1820–1900) who succeeded to the title as Sir Thomas Earle, 2nd Baronet, and was a Justice of the peace (JP) and Deputy lieutenant for Lancashire and a JP for Liverpool; he married in 1853 Emily Fletcher, daughter of William Fletcher, banker of Liverpool, and left eight sons and three daughters, including the future line of baronets.
- Mary Earle, died in infancy in 1821.
- Hardman Earle junior (1825–1853) who died at sea aged 28, married the daughter of a 'Brazilian merchant',
- Elizabeth Earle (1826–1905), remained unmarried
- Emily Earle (1827–1914), married Hugh Perkins a wool broker,
- Harriet Earle (1829–1913), married Archibold Tod a share broker,
- Georgina Earle (1830–1908), married Hugh Longueville Jones a fundholder and JP,
- Caroline Earle (1833–1875), married a brother of the same Brazilian merchant's daughter that her brother Hardman junior had married,
- William Earle (1834–1885), who became a Major General, married Mary the daughter of General Sir William John Codrington
- Arthur Earle (1839–1919), married the daughter of a merchant and diplomat.

Mary died in 1850 aged 52; Hardman died on 25 January 1877. Both were buried at St Peter's Church, Woolton, Liverpool.

Sir Hardman frequently made time for sport, he was well known for riding with the Cheshire hounds almost until his death. He was a founding player at Liverpool Cricket Club, he also leased part of his grounds to the club from 1845 to 1880.

== See also ==
Earle baronets

== Sources ==
- Baxter, Bertram (1979). Baxter, David (ed.). British Locomotive Catalogue 1825–1923. Vol. 2B: London and North Western Railway and its constituent companies. Ashbourne, Derbyshire: Moorland Publishing Company. ISBN 0-903485-84-2.
- Biddle, Gordon (2003). Britain's Historic Railway Buildings: An Oxford Gazetteer of Structures and Sites. Oxford: Oxford University Press. ISBN 9780198662471.
- Braine, Peter (2010). The Railway Moon: A man and his railway: Sir Richard Moon and the L&NWR. Taunton: PMB. ISBN 978-0-9565290-0-8.
- Carlson, Robert Eugene (1969). The Liverpool & Manchester Railway Project, 1821-1831. Newton Abbot: David & Charles.
- Casserley, H.C. (1963). British locomotive names of the twentieth century (2 ed.). OCLC 12442632.
- Chandler, George (1964). Four Centuries of Banking as Illustrated by the Bankers, Customers and Staff Associated with the Constituent Banks of Martins Bank Limited: The Grasshopper and the Liver Bird. Vol. 1. Liverpool and London: Batsford Ltd.
- Dawson, Anthony (2020). The Liverpool and Manchester Railway : an operating history. Barnsley, South Yorkshire: Pen & Sword Transport. ISBN 978-1-4738-9913-1. OCLC 1204607582.
- Earle, Isaac Newton (1925). History and genealogy of the Earles of Secaucus : with an account of other English and American branches. Marquette, Mich.: Guelff.
- Earle, T. Algernon (1890). "Earle of Allerton Tower" (PDF). Transactions of the Historic Society of Lancashire and Cheshire. 42. Liverpool: 15–76.
- Ellison, Thomas (1886). The Cotton Trade of Great Britain: including a history of the Liverpool cotton market and of the Liverpool Cotton Brokers' Association. London: Effingham Wilson.
- Grant, Donald J. (2017). Directory of the Railway Companies of Great Britain (1st ed.). Kibworth Beauchamp, Leicestershire: Troubador Publishing Ltd. ISBN 978-1-78803-768-6.
- Holt, Geoffrey O.; Biddle, Gordon (1986). The North West. A Regional history of the railways of Great Britain. Vol. 10 (2nd ed.). David St. John Thomas. ISBN 978-0-946537-34-1. OCLC 643506870.
- Larkin, Edgar J.; Larkin, John G. (1988). The Railway Workshops of Britain, 1823-1986. Basingstoke: Macmillan. ISBN 978-1-349-08074-8. OCLC 1053798352.
- Onslow, Tony; Sturgeon, John (2007). Dogs and Ladies Not Allowed: The 200 Year History of Liverpool Cricket Club. Countryvise Limited. ISBN 978-1901231847.
- Reed, Brian (1969). Crewe to Carlisle. Shepperton, Surrey: Ian Allan. SBN 7110-0057-3.
- Reed, Malcolm C. (1996). The London & North Western Railway: A History. Atlantic Transport. ISBN 978-0-906899-66-3.
- Talbot, E. (1978). LNWR Miscellany. Oxford Publishing Co.
- Webster, Norman W. (1972). Britain's First Trunk Line:The Grand Junction Railway. Adams & Dart. SBN 239 00105 2.

Baronetage of the United Kingdom
New creation	Baronet (of Allerton Tower); 1869–1877	Succeeded by Thomas Earle
