= Earle baronets =

Titles in the Baronetages of England and UK

There have been two baronetcies created for persons with the surname Earle, one in the Baronetage of England and one in the Baronetage of the United Kingdom. One creation is extant as of 2007.

The Earle Baronetcy, of Stragglethorpe in the County of Lincoln, was created in the Baronetage of the United Kingdom on 2 July 1629 for Richard Earle. The title became extinct on the death of the fourth Baronet in 1697.

The Earle Baronetcy, of Allerton Tower in Woolton (South Liverpool) in the parish of Childwall in the County Palatine of Lancaster, was created in the Baronetage of the United Kingdom on 3 November 1869 for the businessman and slave trader Hardman Earle. The Earle family descends from John Earle of Warrington. His son John settled in Liverpool and served as Mayor of the city in 1709. His grandson Thomas Earle, also a slave trader, was Mayor of Liverpool in 1787. He was the father of William Earle, Mayor of Liverpool in 1836, and of Sir Hardman Earle, 1st Baronet.

In the 1830s, when the British government emancipated the slaves, the Earles were compensated to the tune of over £25,000 for the liberation of over 300 slaves over 12 estates across Antigua.

== Earle baronets, of Stragglethorpe (1629) ==
Augustine Earle purchased the Manor of Stragglethorpe from the Lacon family in 1608, who in turn had brought it off the Rygge family a few years before. The Lacon and Rygges were related by marriage. Besides Richard, he had a further 5 children by his then third wife, Francis, who was sister to Sir Thomas Coney of Bassingthorpe. The BishopsTranscripts for Stragglethorpe contain some details of the Births, Deaths and Marriages in the hamlet. Augustine was buried in the Chapel of Stragglethorpe in 1636 and his will, dated 20 July 1636, can be downloaded from the National Archives.

Escutcheon of the Earle baronets of Craglethorpe

- Sir Richard Earle, 1st Baronet (c. 1606 - bur 27 March 1667)
- Sir Richard Earle, 2nd Baronet (bapt c.1652 - bur 6 July 1678)
- Sir Richard Earle, 3rd Baronet (bapt 11 Nov 1629 - bur 13 Dec 1679)
- Sir Richard Earle, 4th Baronet (bapt 11 July 1672 – bur 20 August 1697)

== Earle baronets, of Allerton Tower (1869) ==
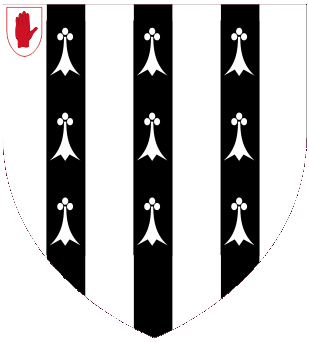
Shield of arms of the Allerton Tower baronets: Argent three pallets Ermines.

- Sir Hardman Earle, 1st Baronet (1792–1877)
- Sir Thomas Earle, 2nd Baronet (1820–1900)
- Sir Henry Earle, 3rd Baronet (1854–1939)
- Sir (Thomas) Algernon Earle, 4th Baronet (1860–1945)
- Sir Hardman Alexander Mort Earle, 5th Baronet (1902–1979)
- Sir Hardman George Algernon Earle, 6th Baronet (1932–2025)
- Sir Robert George Bligh Earle, 7th Baronet (born 1970)
