= William Earle (British Army officer) =

British soldier (1833–1885)

Major-General William Earle CB
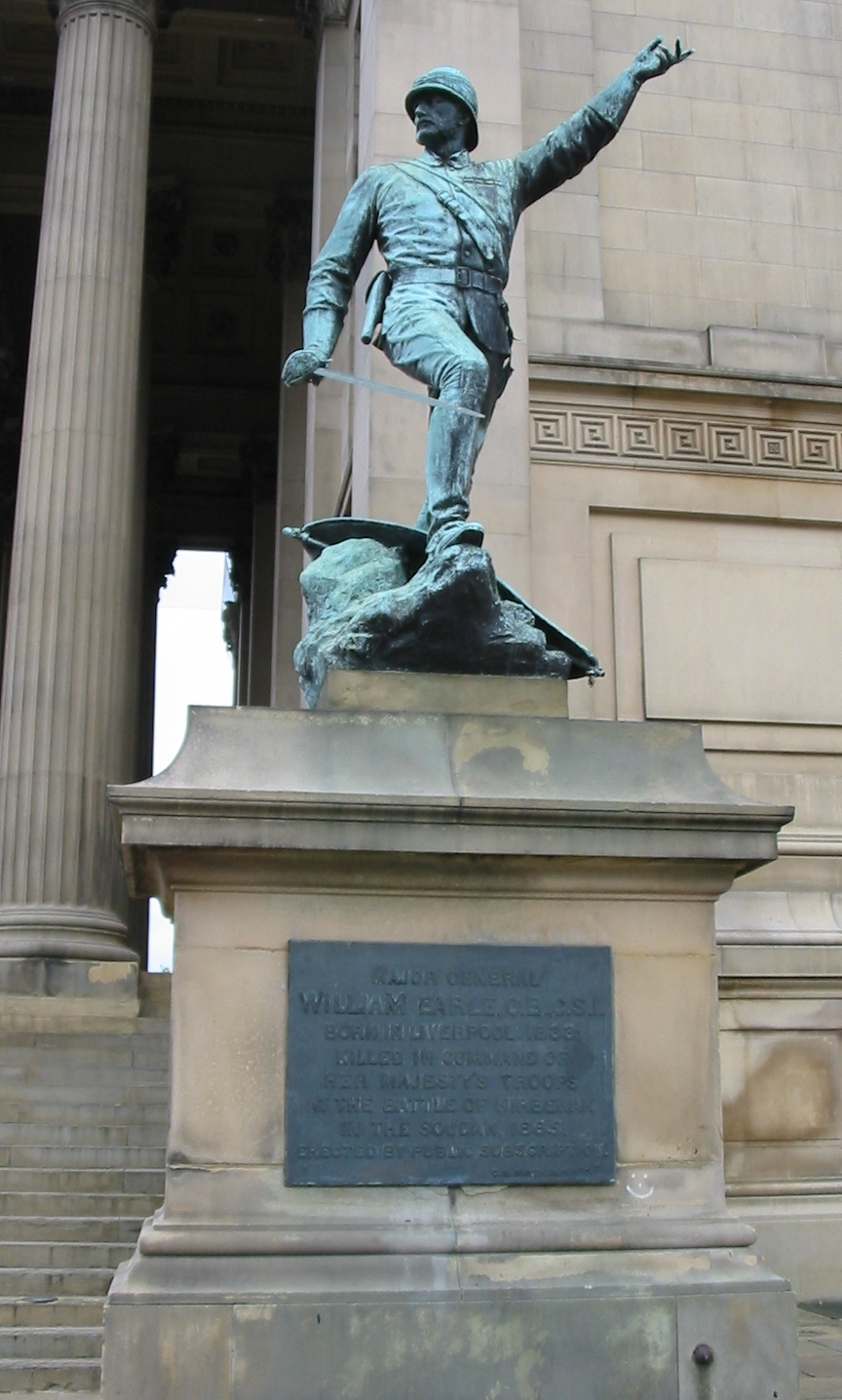
- Statue of William Earle outside St George's Hall, Liverpool
- Born: 18 May 1833; Liverpool, England
- Died: 10 February 1885 (aged 51); Battle of Kirbekan, Battle of Kirbekan Sudan

Major-General William Earle CB (18 May 1833 – 10 February 1885) was a British Army officer of the 19th century.

== Military career ==
He had a successful military career, recognised by honours including a Companion of the Order of the Bath. He fought in the Crimean War and was later part of the Nile Expedition attempting to relieve General Gordon at Khartoum. He was killed following the Battle of Kirbekan.

== Personal life ==
He was born in Liverpool, the son of the merchant Sir Hardman Earle, 1st Baronet and his wife Mary (née Langton). He married Mary Codrington, daughter of William Codrington on 21 July 1864. His grandfather was the slave trader Thomas Earle.

== Legacy ==
There is a bronze statue of him outside St George's Hall, Liverpool, by sculptor Charles Bell Birch. There is also a stone bust of General Earle at St Mark's Anglican Church in Alexandria, Egypt. This bust is mentioned by E. M. Forster in his Alexandria: A History and a Guide, and by Lawrence Durrell in his novel Justine, the first volume of The Alexandria Quartet.
