= Brant Broughton =

Village in Lincolnshire, England

Coordinates: 53.077715°N 0.63253°W

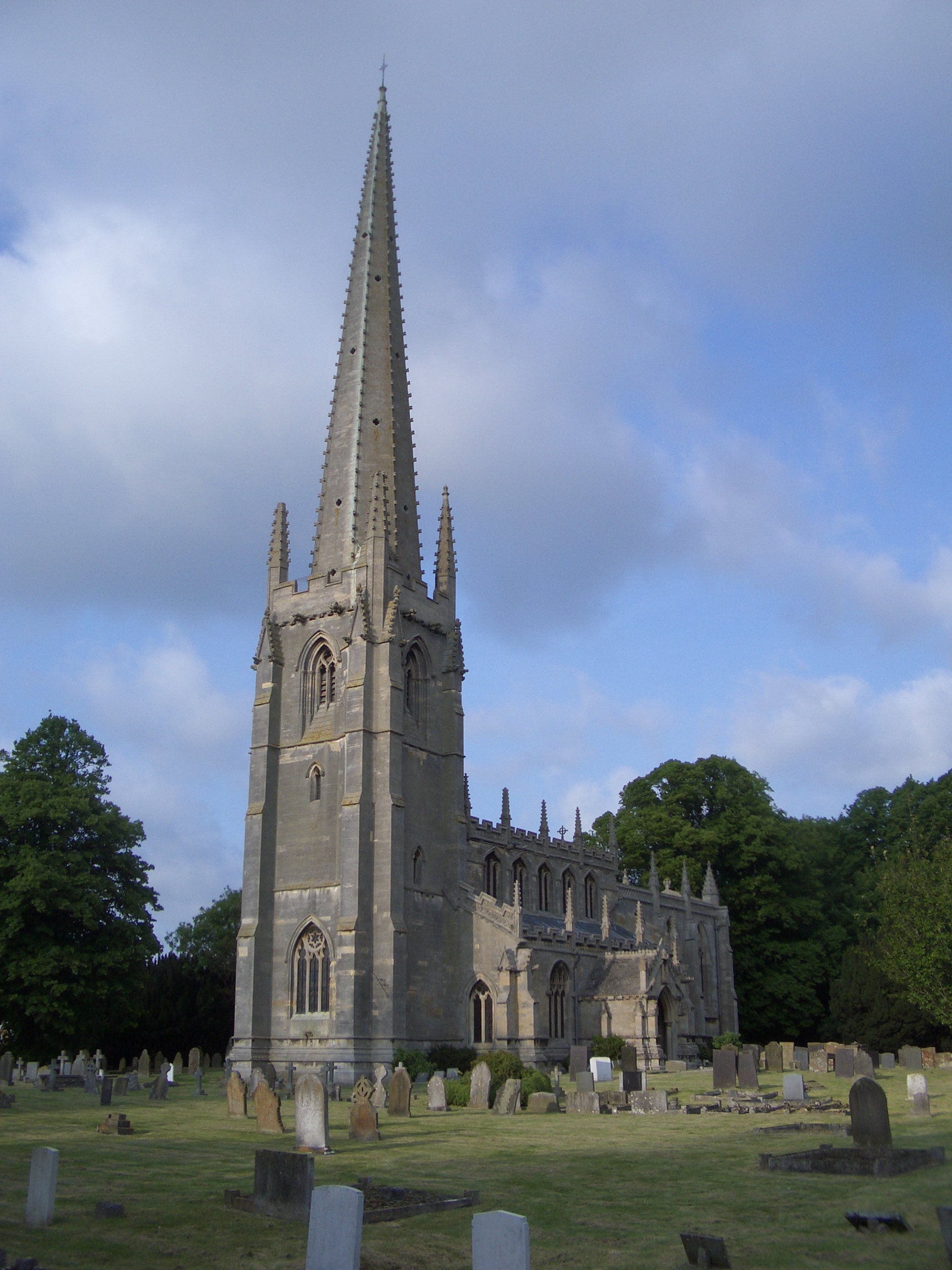
- St Helen's Church, Brant Broughton

- Location within Lincolnshire
- Population: 639
- OS grid reference: SK917542
  - London: 110 mi (180 km) S
- Civil parish: Brant Broughton and Stragglethorpe
- District: North Kesteven
- Shire county: Lincolnshire
- Region: East Midlands
- Country: England
- Sovereign state: United Kingdom
- Post town: Lincoln
- Postcode district: LN5
- Police: Lincolnshire
- Fire: Lincolnshire
- Ambulance: East Midlands
- UK Parliament: Sleaford and North Hykeham

Brant Broughton (pronounced Brew-ton) is a village in the civil parish of Brant Broughton and Stragglethorpe, in the North Kesteven district of Lincolnshire, England. It lies north of the A17 approximately 8 miles (13 km) east of Newark-on-Trent, 12 miles (19 km) north west of Sleaford and 12 miles (19 km) south of Lincoln. In 1921 the parish had a population of 515. On 1 April 1931 the parish was abolished and merged with Stragglethorpe to form "Brant Broughton and Stragglethorpe".

== Geography ==
Brant Broughton lies north of the A17 road and west of Leadenham, where the A17 crosses the A607 road. The River Brant flows to the east of the village, where it is joined by the Sand Beck. The name itself means 'fortified settlement on the River Brant’.

The village has a very wide main street with many of the houses dating back to the coaching days of the 18th and 19th centuries when many of the residents were based in London and used the village for their country retreats.

An unusual building in the village is the converted barn in Meeting House Lane, built in 1701. Used as a meeting house by the Quakers, it retains its original furnishings.

The Grade I listed Anglican parish church of St Helen, which Pevsner describes as having "one of the most elegant spires of Lincolnshire". Although restored between 1873 and 1876, it retains its 170 ft. high spire, an Early English nave, arcades and chancel arch, and Perpendicular vaulted porches and clerestory.

== Notable people ==
The theologian William Warburton, later the Bishop of Gloucester, lived in Brant Broughton for eighteen years. During this time, Warburton's research resulted in his treatises Alliance between Church and State (1736) and Divine Legation of Moses (2 vols., 1737–41).

In 1798, Sir Richard Sutton 2nd Baronet of Norwood Park, Nottinghamshire, was born in Brant Broughton. (See Sutton baronets of Norwood Park (1772).)

== See also ==
- St. Helen's Church, Brant Broughton

== Sources ==
- Urban, Sylvanus, ed. (1856). "Obituary Sir Richard Sutton, Bart". The Gentleman's Magazine. XLV (new series): 80–82.
