= Stragglethorpe =

Village in Lincolnshire, England

Coordinates: 53.059156°N 0.640975°W

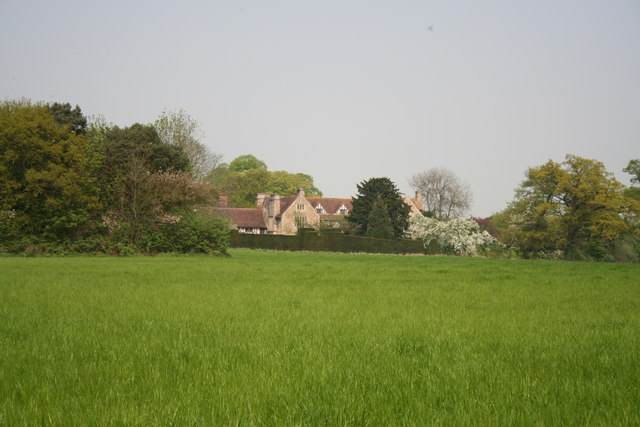
- Stragglethorpe Hall

- Location within Lincolnshire
- OS grid reference: SK911521
  - London: 110 mi (180 km) S
- Civil parish: Brant Broughton and Stragglethorpe
- District: North Kesteven
- Shire county: Lincolnshire
- Region: East Midlands
- Country: England
- Sovereign state: United Kingdom
- Post town: Lincoln
- Postcode district: LN5
- Police: Lincolnshire
- Fire: Lincolnshire
- Ambulance: East Midlands
- UK Parliament: Sleaford and North Hykeham

Stragglethorpe is a village in the civil parish of Brant Broughton and Stragglethorpe, in the North Kesteven district of Lincolnshire, England. The village is situated approximately 8 miles (13 km) east of Newark-on-Trent. These figures refer to the population of Brant Broughton and Stragglethorpe combined. However, slips of paper can be found in the Stragglethorpe churchwardens' accounts for 1801, 1811 and 1821, which record the population as 79, 92 and 100 respectively while denoting the number of inhabited houses and families as 14/17, 16/16 and 18/19. In 1921 the parish had a population of 86. On 1 April 1931 the parish was abolished and merged with Brant Broughton to form "Brant Broughton with Stragglethorpe".

Before 1931, Stragglethorpe had been associated with the land and villages to the West of it, namely Beckingham, Sutton and Fenton. In fact, a thousand years before, it had been an outlying hamlet to the village of Holme. The Saxon "thorpe" part of its name denotes this fact; confusingly, Holme Manor and buildings were just to the south of Sutton and were abandoned many centuries ago; the earth mounds and ramparts were levelled by the landowner in the early 1970s. It seems to be widely accepted by recent historians, but not proved, that the other church mentioned in the Domesday Book of 1086 under the heading of Holme was in fact that belonging to Stragglethorpe. The expression "Stragglethorpe in the parish of Beckingham" is used repeatedly in the title of the Bishops' Transcripts during the late 16th and 17th centuries; these can be found in the Lincoln Archives.

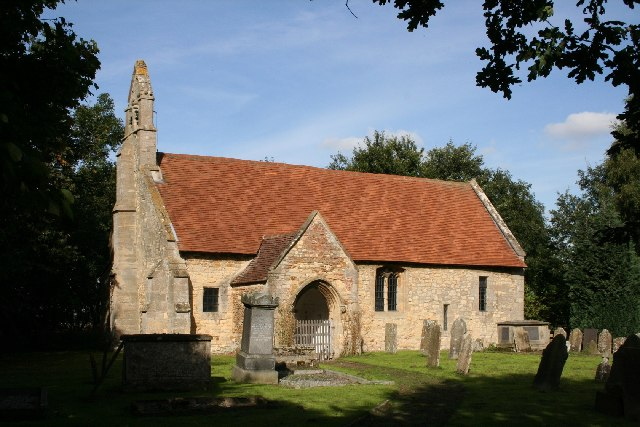
St Michael's Church

Saint Michael's Church is a Grade I listed building dating from the 11th century, now in the care of the Historic Churches Preservation Trust. It has an 11th-century font and 18th-century box pews. Several well-respected church architects have the opinion that the West wall of the church is pre Norman Conquest (1066). This wall is rubble-built with a later buttress added for the stability of the bell cote. When viewed from the inside, an early west-facing doorway with triangular stone lintel and a window opening above are clearly visible. There used to be a Rood screen in the church – the carved stone supports on either side are clear evidence of this. It was mentioned in the notes of William Monson when he visited on 9 August 1833, and a report in the Grantham Journal of 1886 tells of how it was bedecked with flowers for the Harvest Festival. However, it must have been removed soon afterwards as a visitor in 1921 reports that there is no chancel screen to be seen. No photographic picture of the screen has come to light as of yet.

The church contains a sumptuous monument to Sir Richard Earle, who died at the age of 24 and without children in August 1697, and as his father was also deceased, the Manor of Stragglethorpe reverted to his mother who was part of the Welby family of Denton. This also marked the beginning of the end of the Earle family's association with the village. The depicted image of this work, by Thomas Green of Camberwell, was captured by the local photographer, Mr Kenewell, about 1910. The visitor to the church today will see a slightly different work of art, as it was vandalised in the 1980s, by someone who prised off the seated cherub.

Very little seems to have been written about this family, who were Lords of the Manor of Stragglethorpe. The exception is the piece written by Alfred C E Welby for Lincolnshire Notes and Queries in 1915, which included some of their family tree. The Parish Registers of the village are of little use, though while the General Register does exist for 1701–1764, it is in very poor condition. However, with a little help from the Lincoln Archives, it is possible to track down and get a sight of the Bishops' Transcripts. They are largely complete (1566-1812) but missing the twenty years from 1641 to 1661.

There is a flat stone slab or ledger stone in the floor of the church near the altar, which commemorates the life of Richard Earle Bart., who died in March 1667. Because of continual wear through footfall over the years, it is now virtually illegible. Fortunately, the church was visited by William Monson on 9 August 1833, who recorded the inscription upon it.

Stragglethorpe Hall is a Grade II listed Elizabethan "H plan" country house dating from the 16th century, and extended between 1912 and 1914. The stable block is also Grade II listed, dating from the same period and with a similar restoration between 1912 and 1914.

Stragglethorpe village hall is a new building, replacing a temporary structure built in 1921 by the RAF. It was built with the aid of a grant from the Big Lottery Fund. The previous sentence does not refer to Stragglethorpe in Lincolnshire, there has never been a village hall in this village, I suspect that the contributor is referring to the village in Nottinghamshire of the same name, near Cotgrave. However, there was a village school but no building – it existed for a few years and probably held in a room in one of the houses. The evidence for this lies in a report by the Nottinghamshire Guardian of August 1869 in which the details of a first anniversary celebration was held, games were held in front of the Hall and the whole event was supported by the two tenant farmers... Mssr Parke and Tonge. Over £5 was raised for the school on the day.

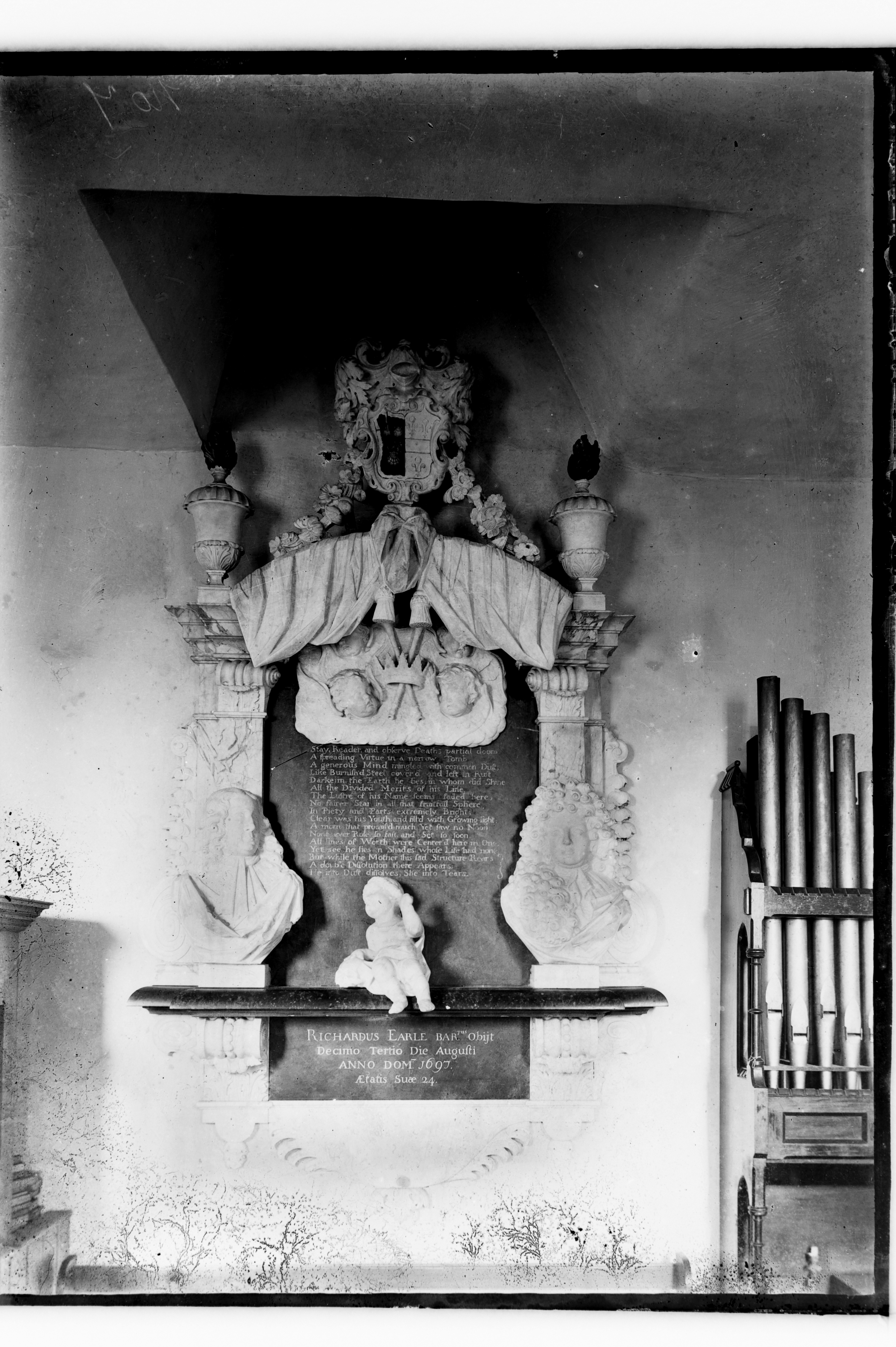
Marble monument to Sir Richard Earle

There was a "Poor House" in the village for many years, and it was mentioned every year in the Chapelwardens' Register, 1796 - 1838, where a typical entry would state: "To Sir Wm Welby for the Poor House Rent... £1-0-0." It also appears that the village was responsible for the upkeep and maintenance of this building, as in 1819 an invoice was paid by the Chapelwarden for £2-8-9d to Mr Gibson's delivery of 1500 bricks for the Poor House. It does not make clear whether this is for repairs or for an extension.

The Lincoln Archives also contain the Hearth Tax of the village for 1662 and 1664. The first list recorded Sir Richard Earle as being assessed for 10 hearths, and two years later being noted as having to pay tax for 13 hearths. The majority of the village had a single hearth while a couple of doubles were noted.

Reading and transcribing the scores of inventories that are associated with Stragglethorpe, and stored in Lincoln Archives, can be most revealing. There is an inventory from 1680 for Thomas Yates, the term "Lady Earles Ground" is mentioned twice along with Cony Close. While it is unclear where Lady Earles Field is today, the whereabouts of Cony Close is well known. The second field to the south of the village, next to Stragglethorpe Lane, has always been known as "Cony Close". It also appears on a map of a transfer deed of over a hundred years ago. The name "Cony" has one wondering whether it was once a rabbit warren, but the answer most probably lies with the Earle family's original connection to the village. Namely that Augustine Earle's third wife (who bore him several children) was Francis Cony of Bassingthorpe near Grantham. She was sister to Sir Thomas Cony, who was probably one of the wealthiest and most influential men in the county of Lincolnshire in the late 16th century.
