= Thomas Erle (disambiguation) =

Thomas Erle may refer to two English people:

- Thomas Erle (1621-1650), lawyer and politician
- Thomas Erle (1650–1720), army general and politician

== See also ==
- Thomas Earle (disambiguation)
