= Battle of Kirbekan =

Battle in the Mahdist War

- Part of the Mahdist War
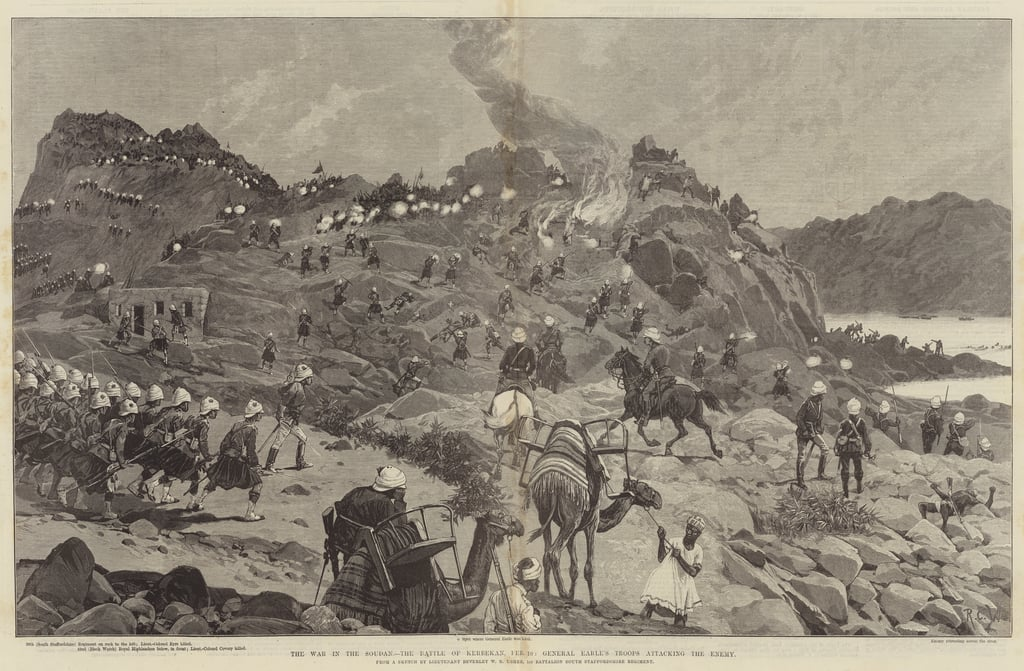
- Richard Caton Woodville, Jr.ː The War in the Soudan, the battle of Kerbekan (c. 1900)
Date	10 February 1885
Location	Mahdist Sudan
Result	British victory

Belligerents
United Kingdom • Canada	Mahdist State

Commanders and leaders
William Earle †	Unknown

Strength
1,000 men	9,000 men

Casualties and losses
60 killed	2,000 killed

The Battle of Kirbekan took place during the Mahdist War. It was fought February 10, 1885, when the British Nile Column, about 1,000 strong, under General Earle, stormed the heights of Kirbekan, which were held by a strong Mahdist force, and totally routed them, with heavy loss.

== Background ==
The British lost 60, among whom was General William Earle. It was the first appearance of the Egyptian Army Camel Corps under Bimbashi Marriott in action. A brass plaque on the North wall of Lichfield Cathedral commemorates the death of Lieutenant colonel Philip Eyre of the First South Staffordshire Regiment in the battle.

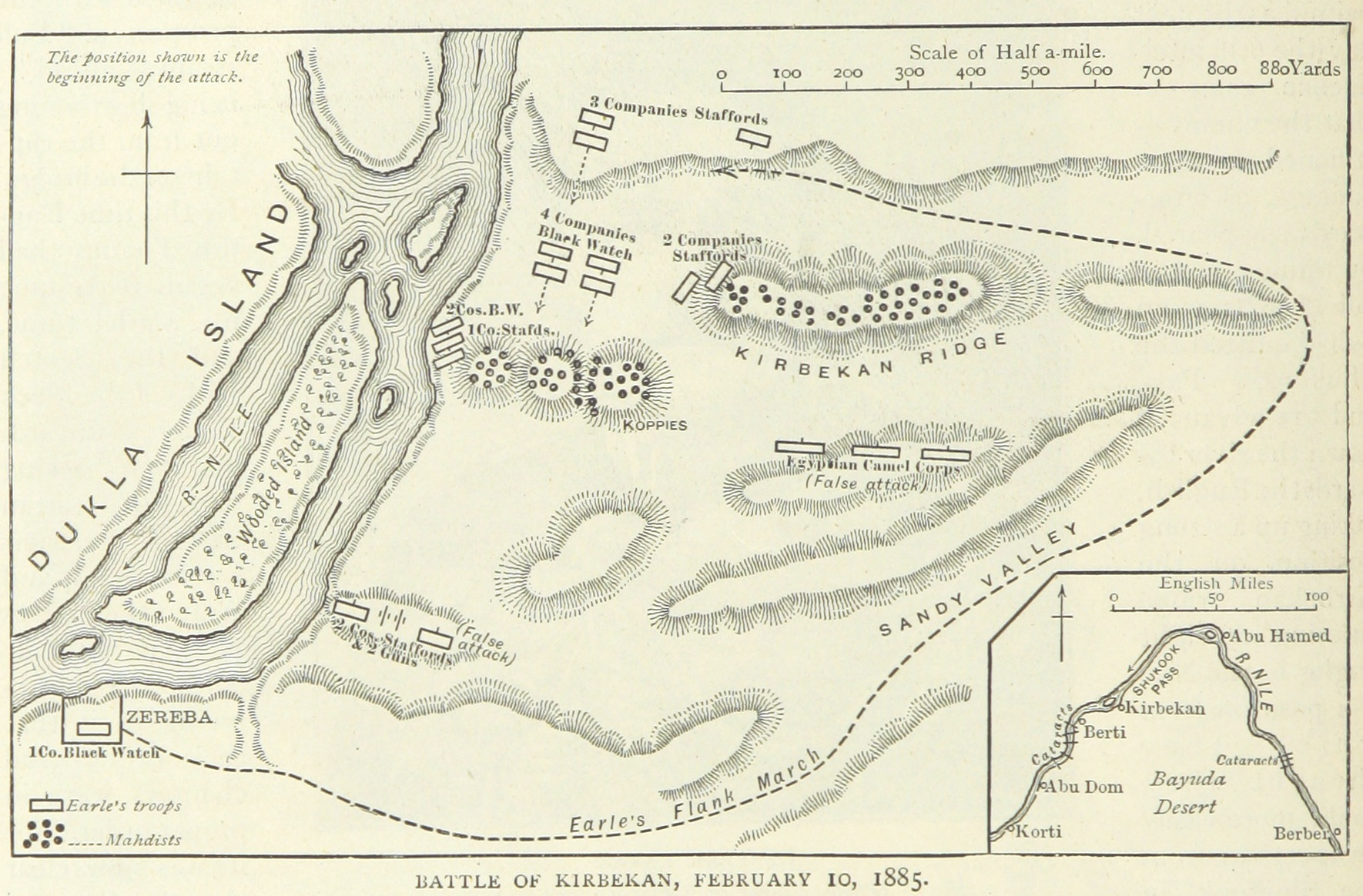
A British map of the battle

== Forces ==
The British forces involved in the battle were:

- Squadron from 19th Hussars
- 1st Battalion, South Staffordshire Regiment
- 1st Battalion, The Black Watch (Royal Highlanders)
- D Company, 1st Battalion, Gordon Highlanders
- 45 Boatmen from Canada
