= St Helen's Church, Brant Broughton =

Coordinates: 53°4′28″N 0°38′5″W

St. Helen's Church, Brant Broughton
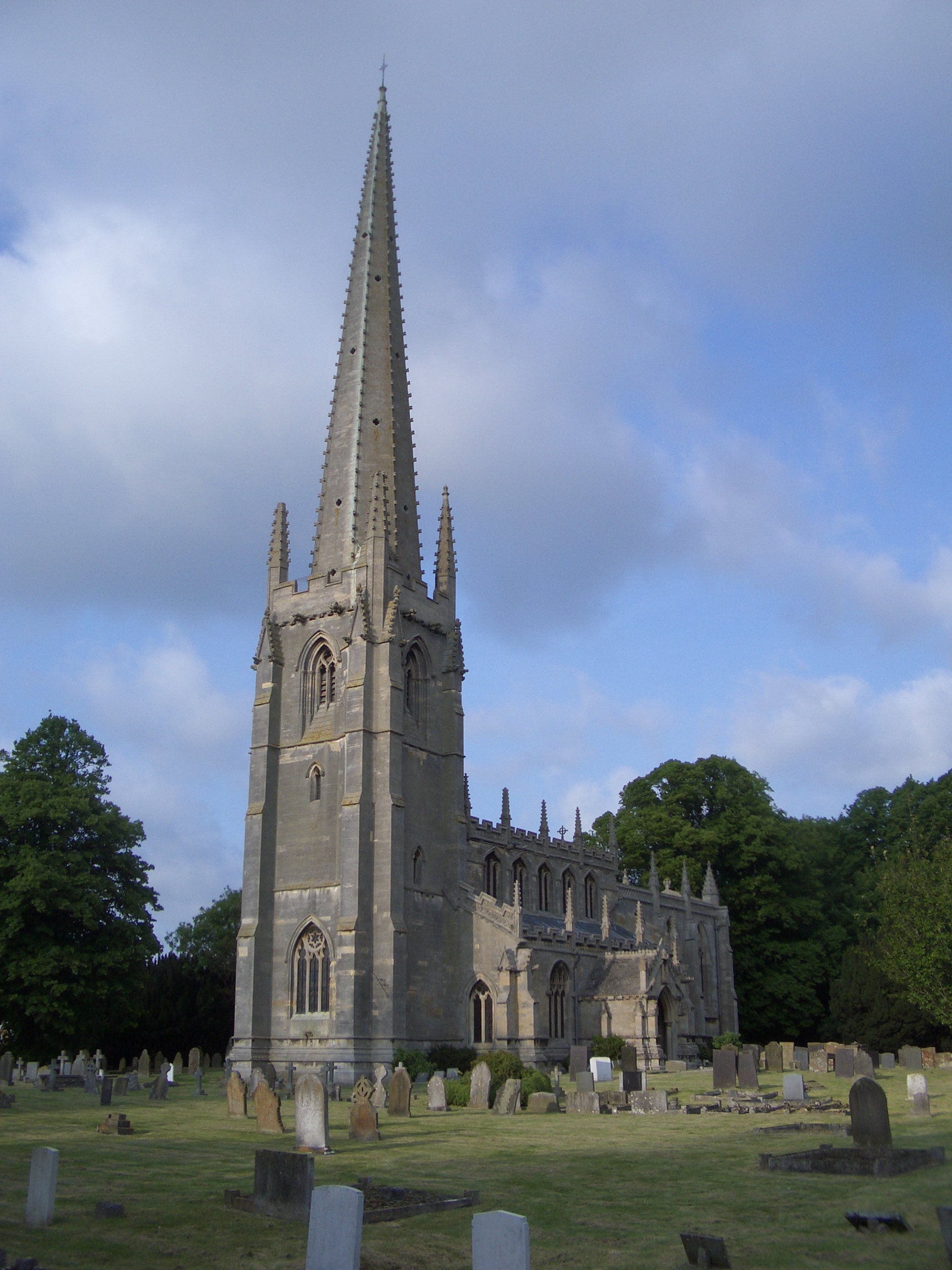
- St. Helen's Church
- St. Helen's Church, Brant Broughton
- Denomination: Church of England
- Churchmanship: Broad Church

Administration
- Province: Province of Canterbury
- Diocese: Diocese of Lincoln

Clergy
- Vicar: The Revd A J Megahey

St Helen's Church is an Anglican church in Brant Broughton, Lincolnshire, England. It is a Grade I listed building.

== History ==
St Helen's Church a medieval church dedicated to 'St Helen' dating from the 13th century. It was heavily restored by the Rector, Canon Frederick Heathcote Sutton and the architect George Frederick Bodley between 1874 and 1876.

The chancel (a rebuild of 1812) was entirely demolished by Bodley in 1874. He added the reredos in 1887. The bells were repaired and refurbished in 1881 by John Taylor of Loughborough.

The wrought ironwork, gates, railings, candlesticks and candelabra were made by the village blacksmith, F. Coldron.

Pevsner described the church as having "one of the most elegant spires of Lincolnshire". The spire although reduced in height in 1897 is commonly misquoted as 198 feet (60 m) high. According to a survey in 2011 by architect Julian Flannery, the spire is actually 167 feet (51 metres) high. Parts of the church date back to about 1290 though most dates back to about the late 14th century.

There is a late 15th-century German painting of the Ascension and a piece of Anglo Saxon interlace stonework in the vestry. Under the tower there are the remains of a 14th-century trinity which has the top half of God The Father missing. There are Green Man bosses to be found in the roof.

== Incumbents ==
- William Warburton 1728 – 1730
- ?
- Revd H Houson ca 1839
- Revd Canon Frederick Heathcote Sutton 1873 – 1889
- Revd Canon Arthur Sutton 1889 – 1924
- ?

== Organ ==
The organ is by Wordsworth and Maskell of Leeds installed in 1876. The organ case was added in 1906.

== Churchyard ==
The churchyard contains the war grave of a Royal Armoured Corps soldier of the Second World War.

== Gallery ==
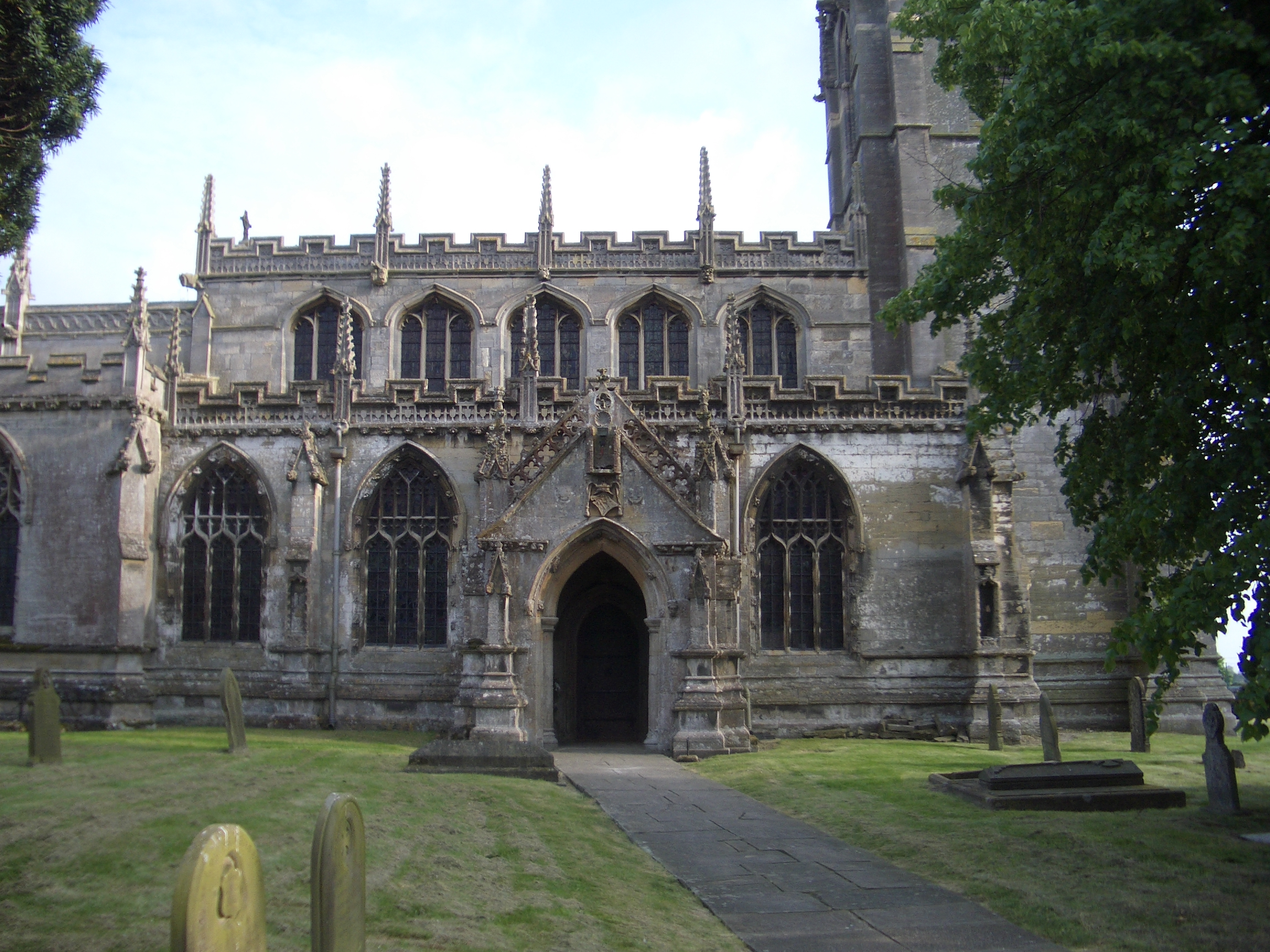

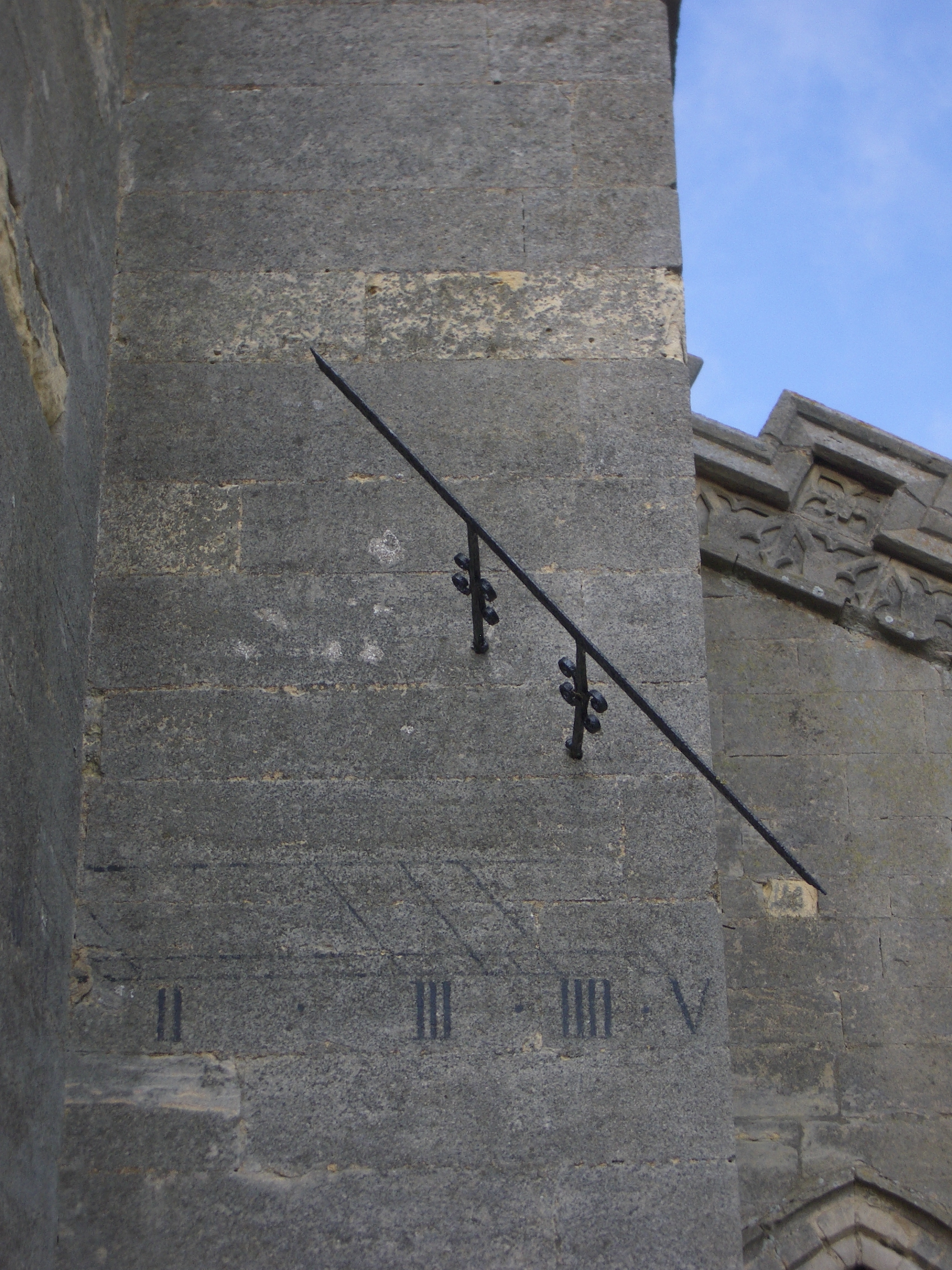

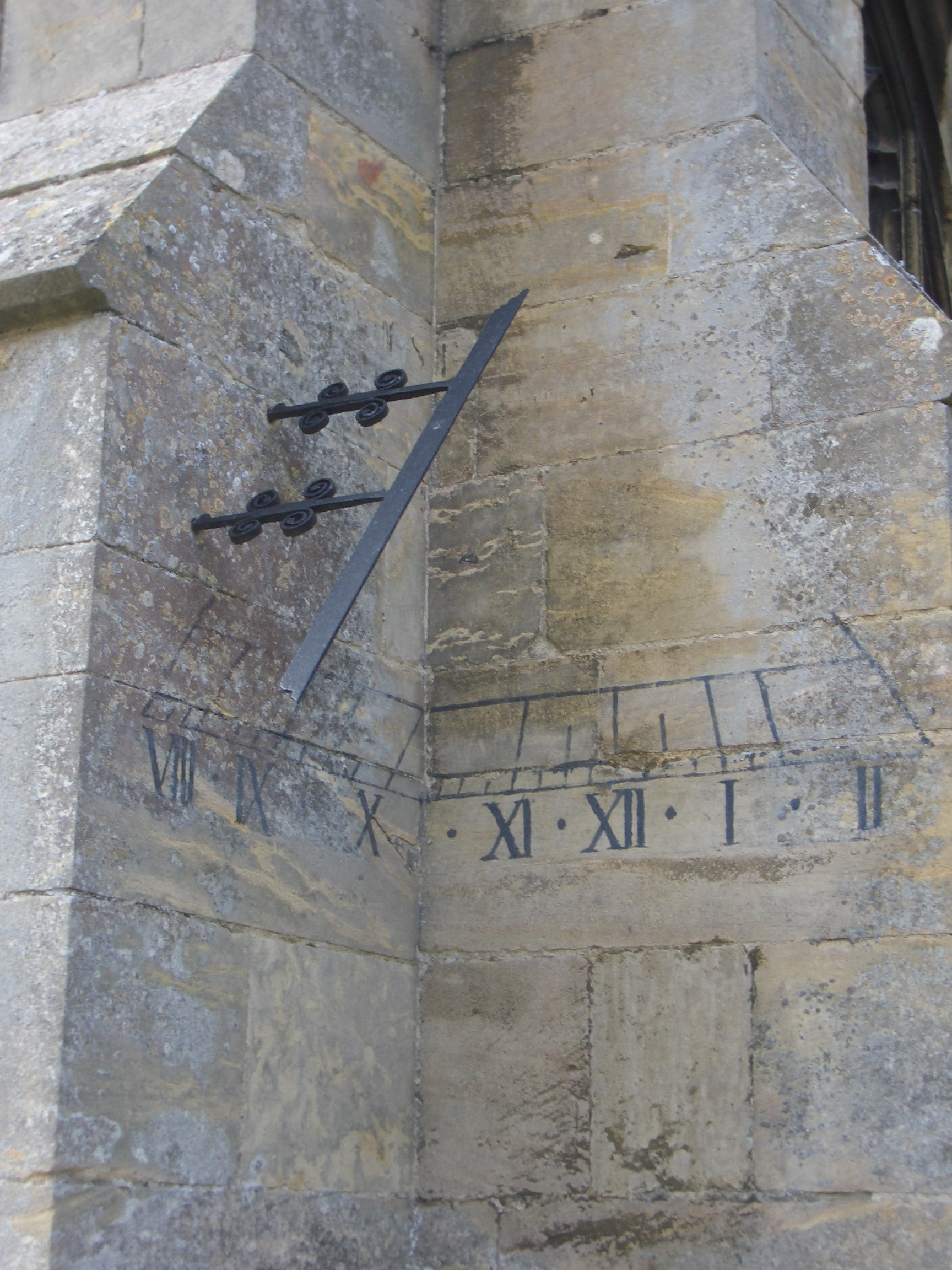

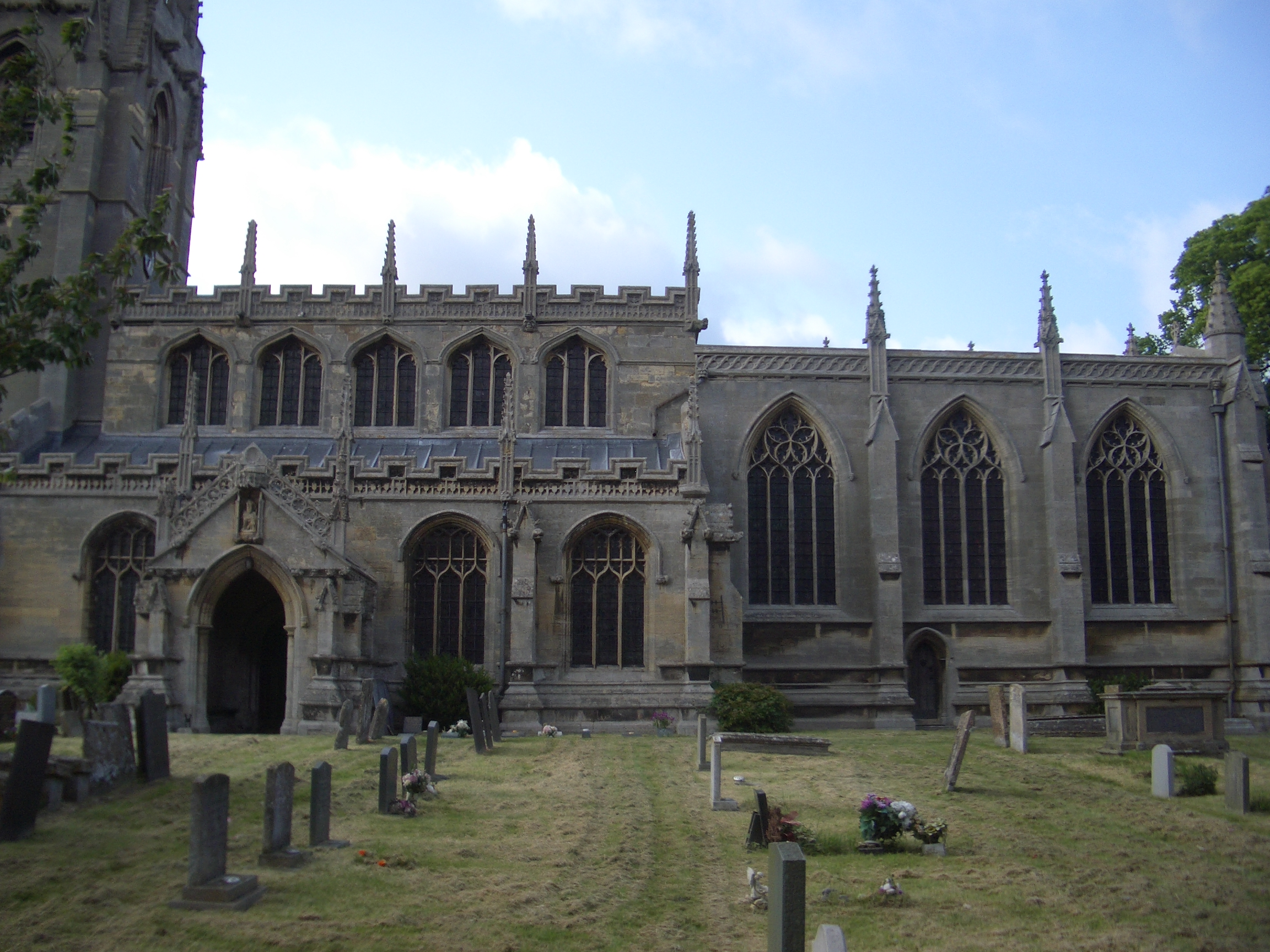

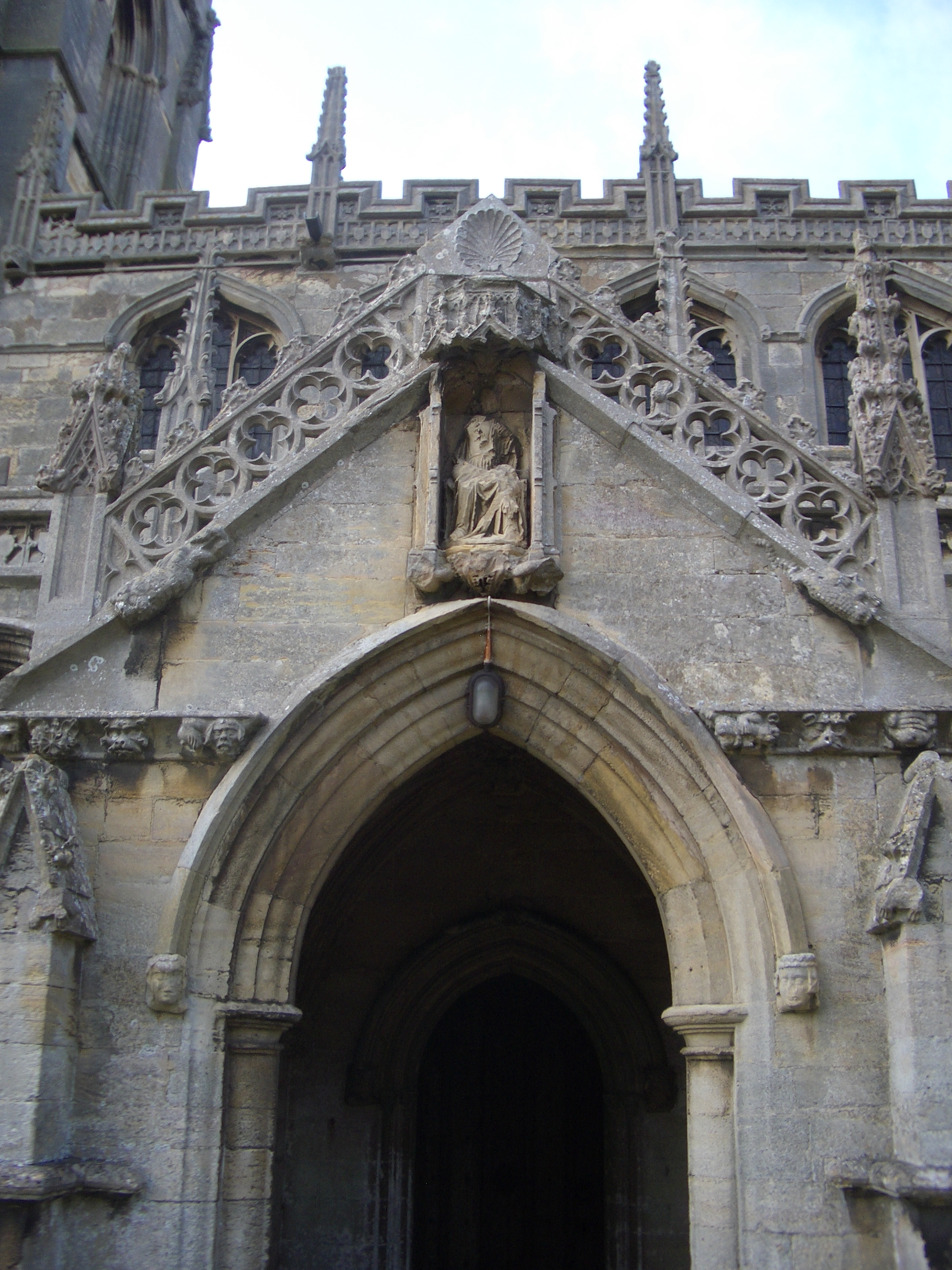

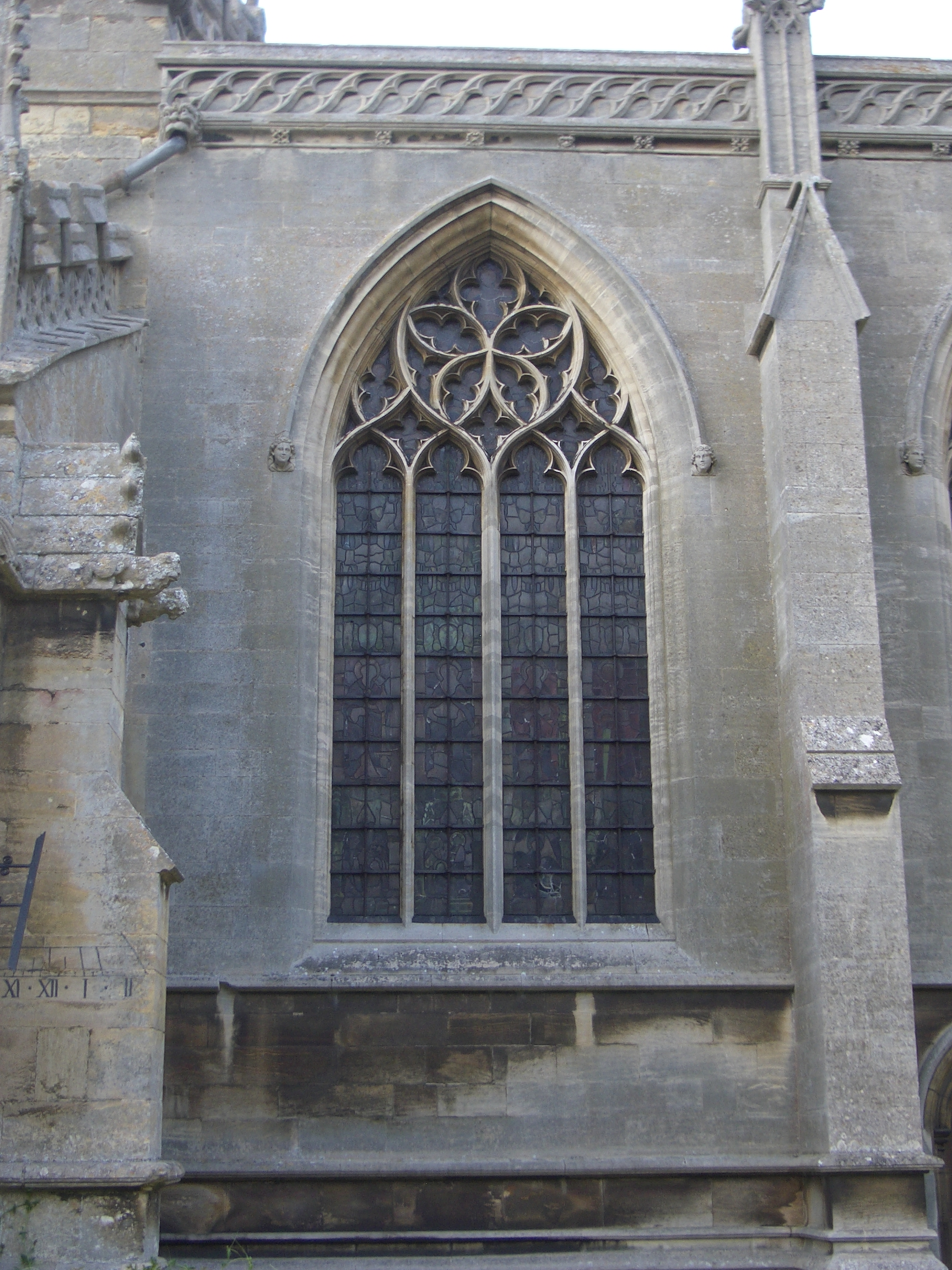

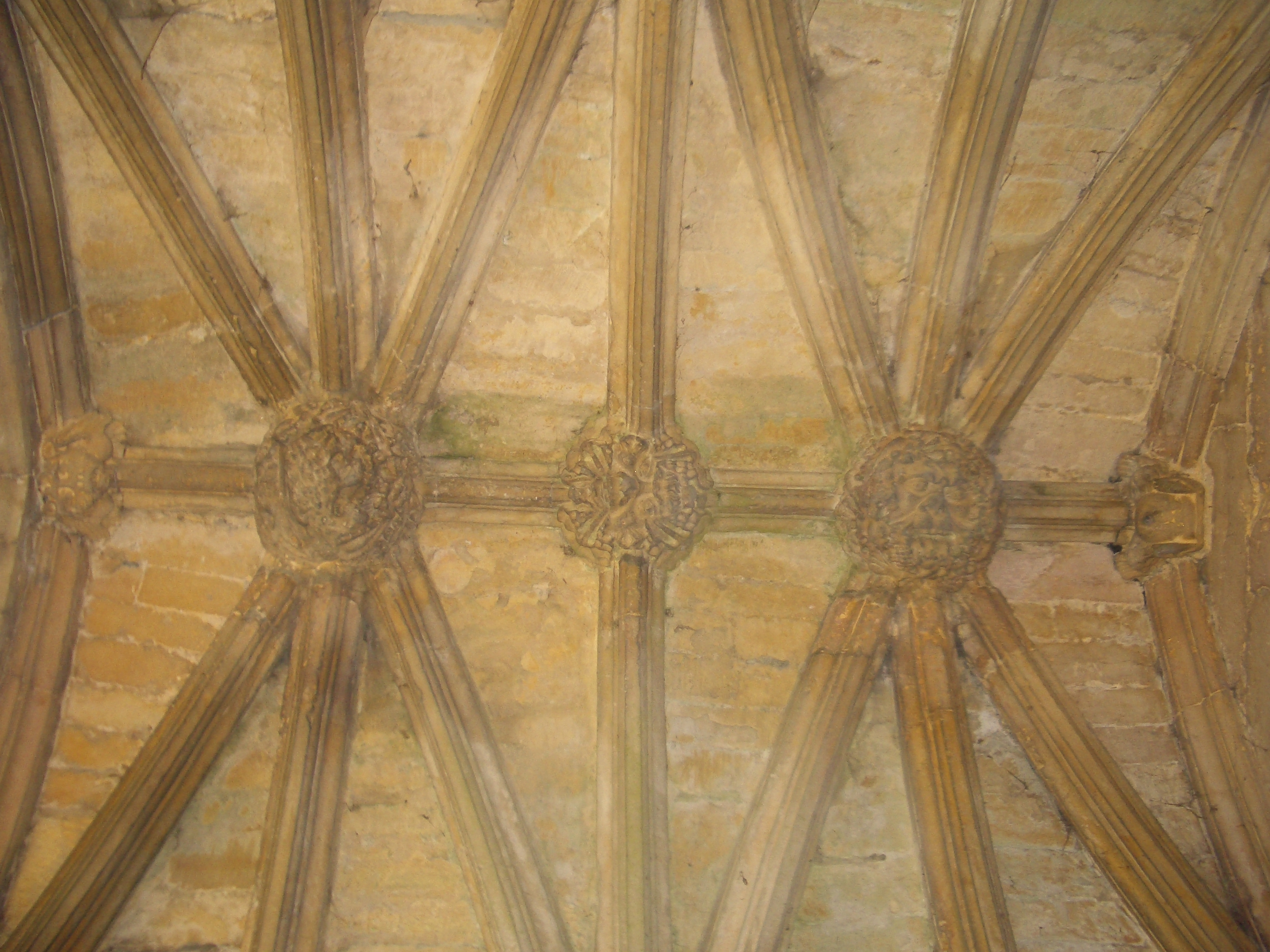

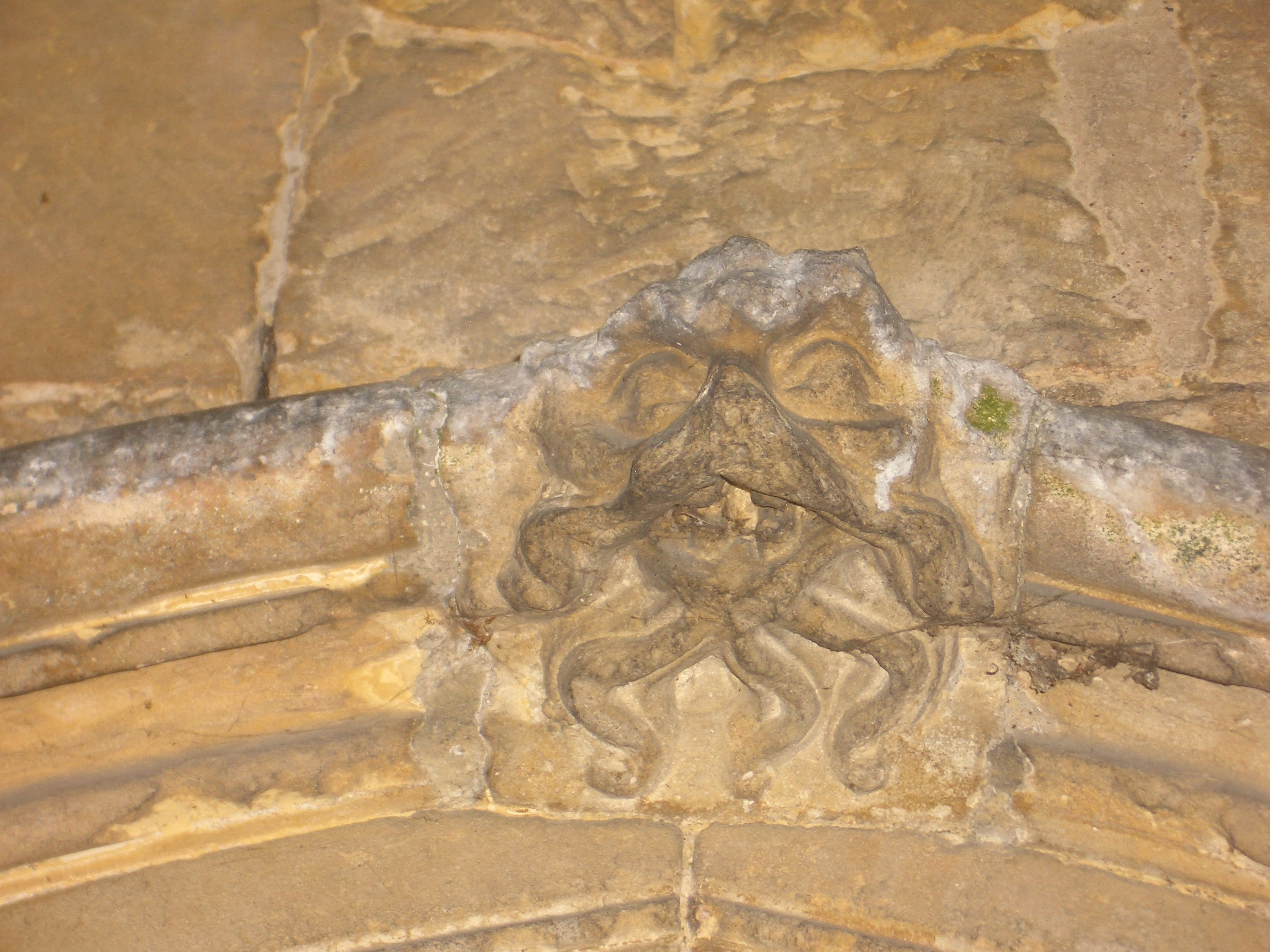

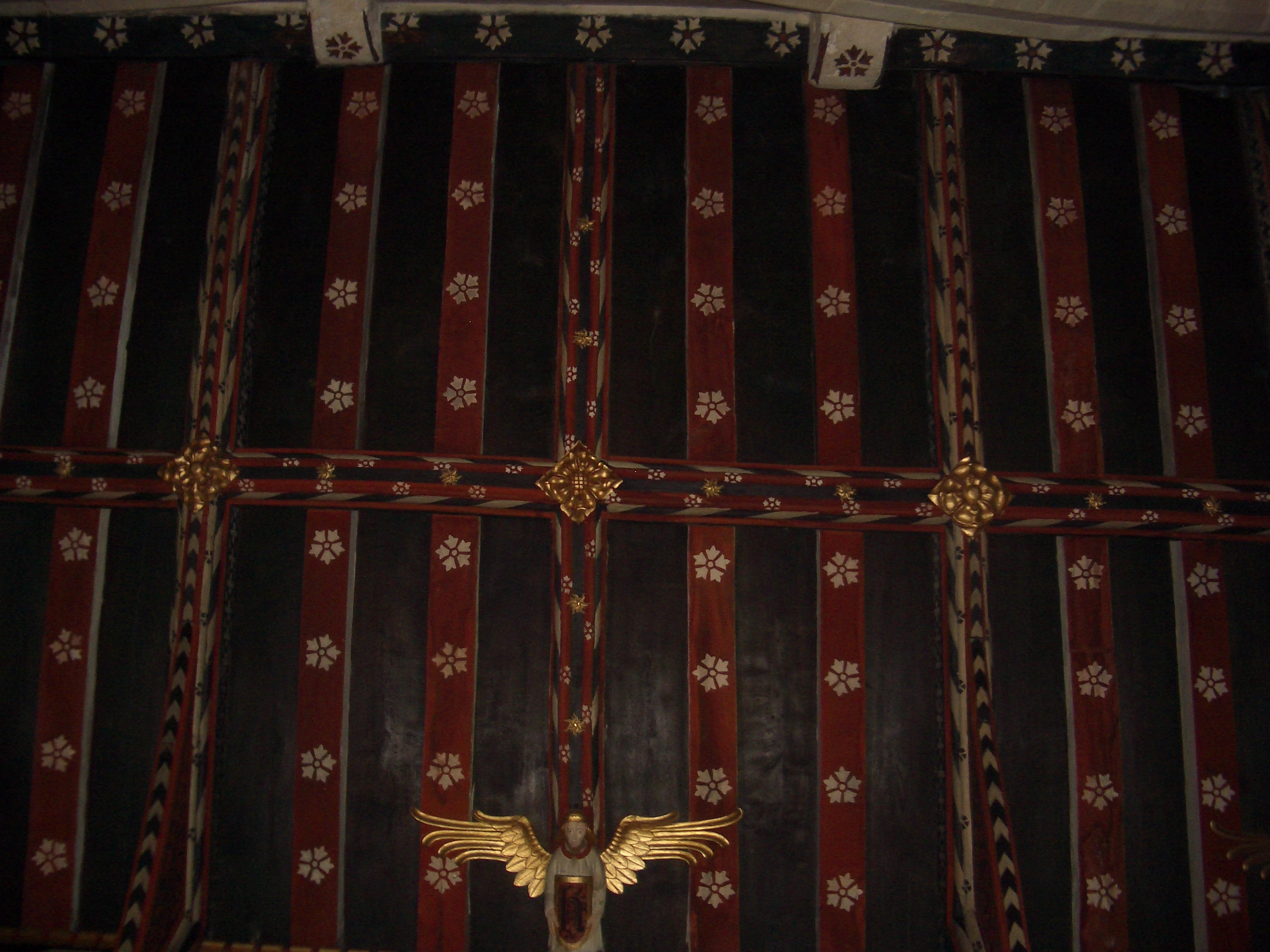

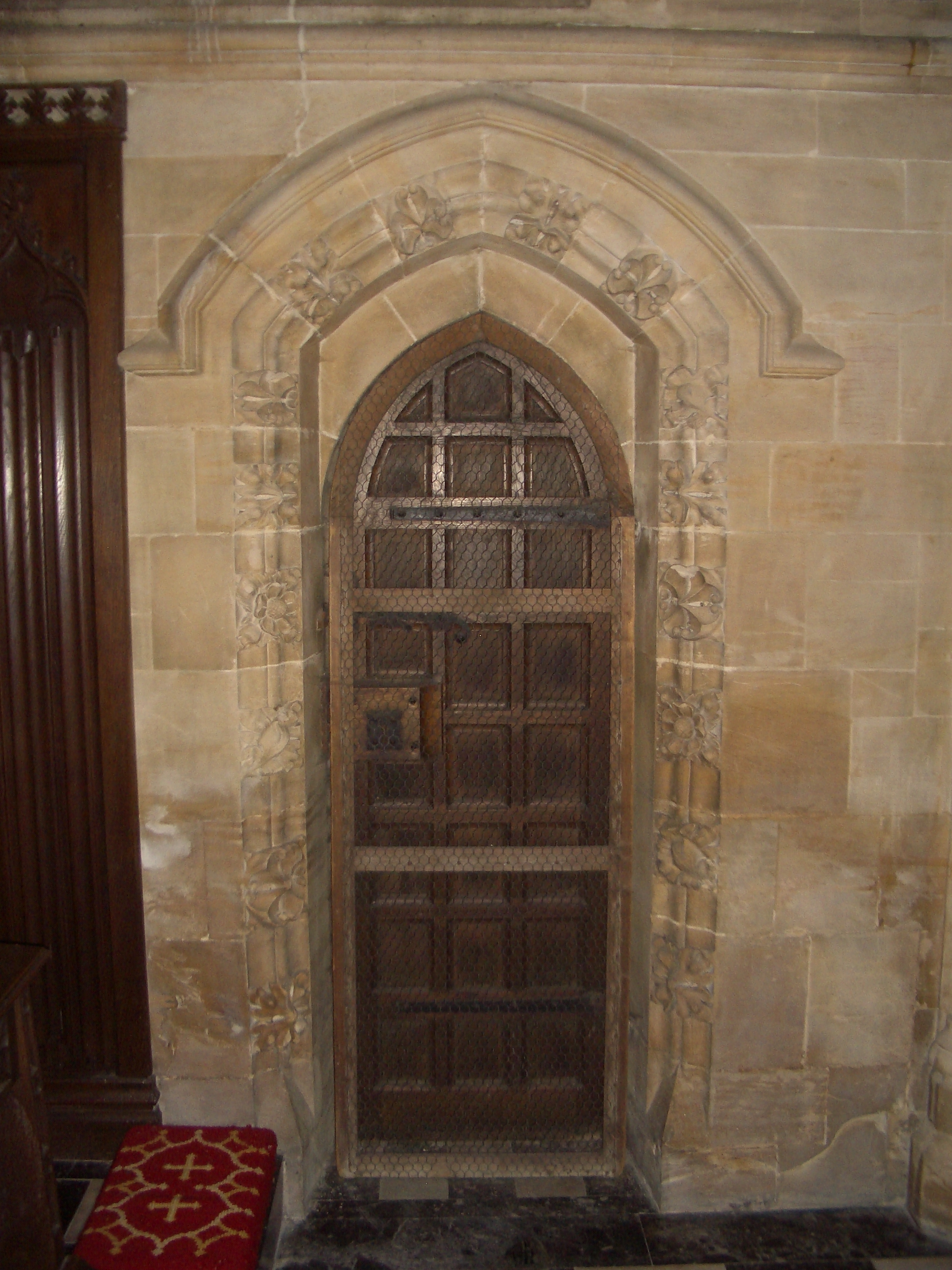

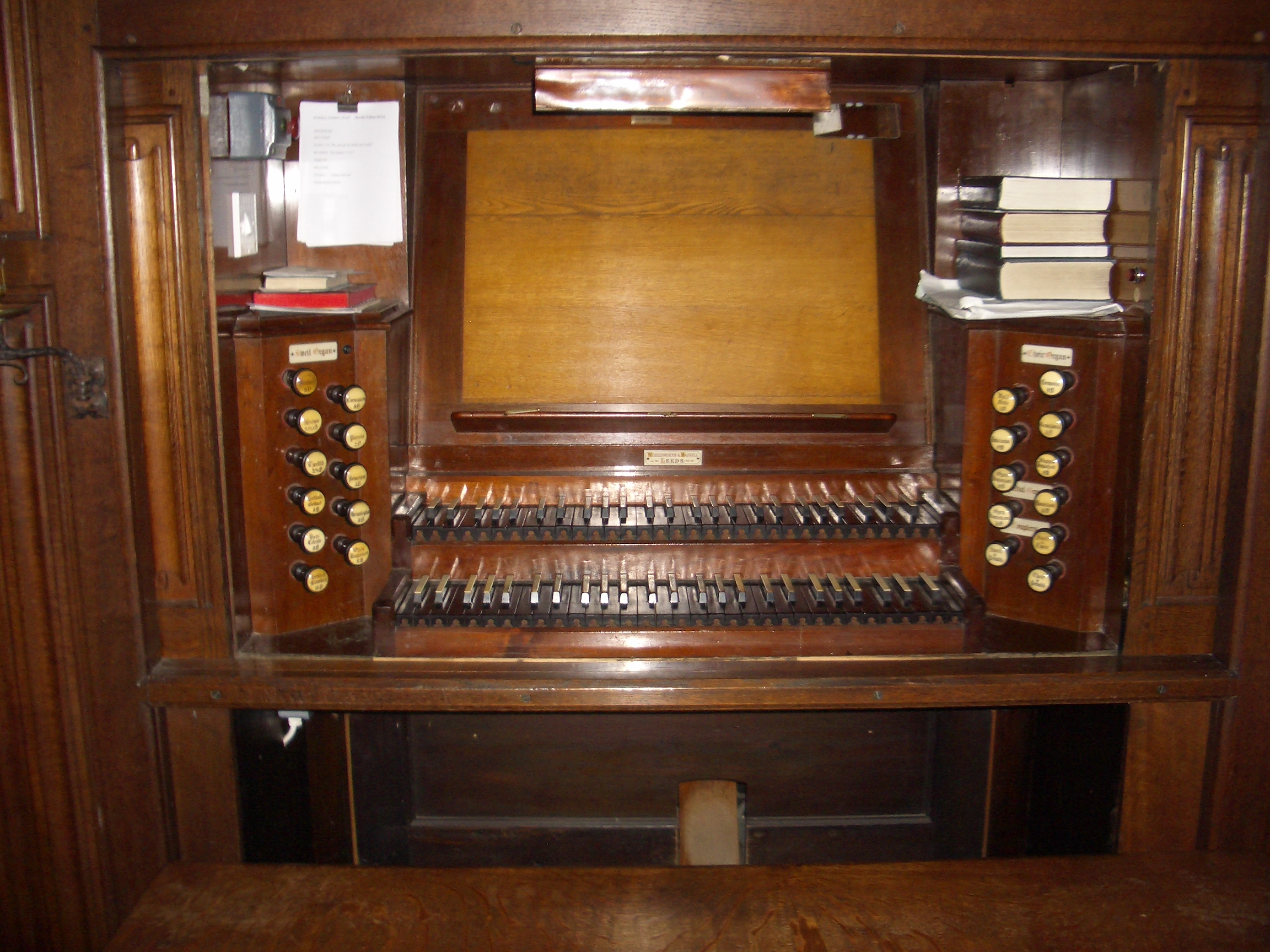

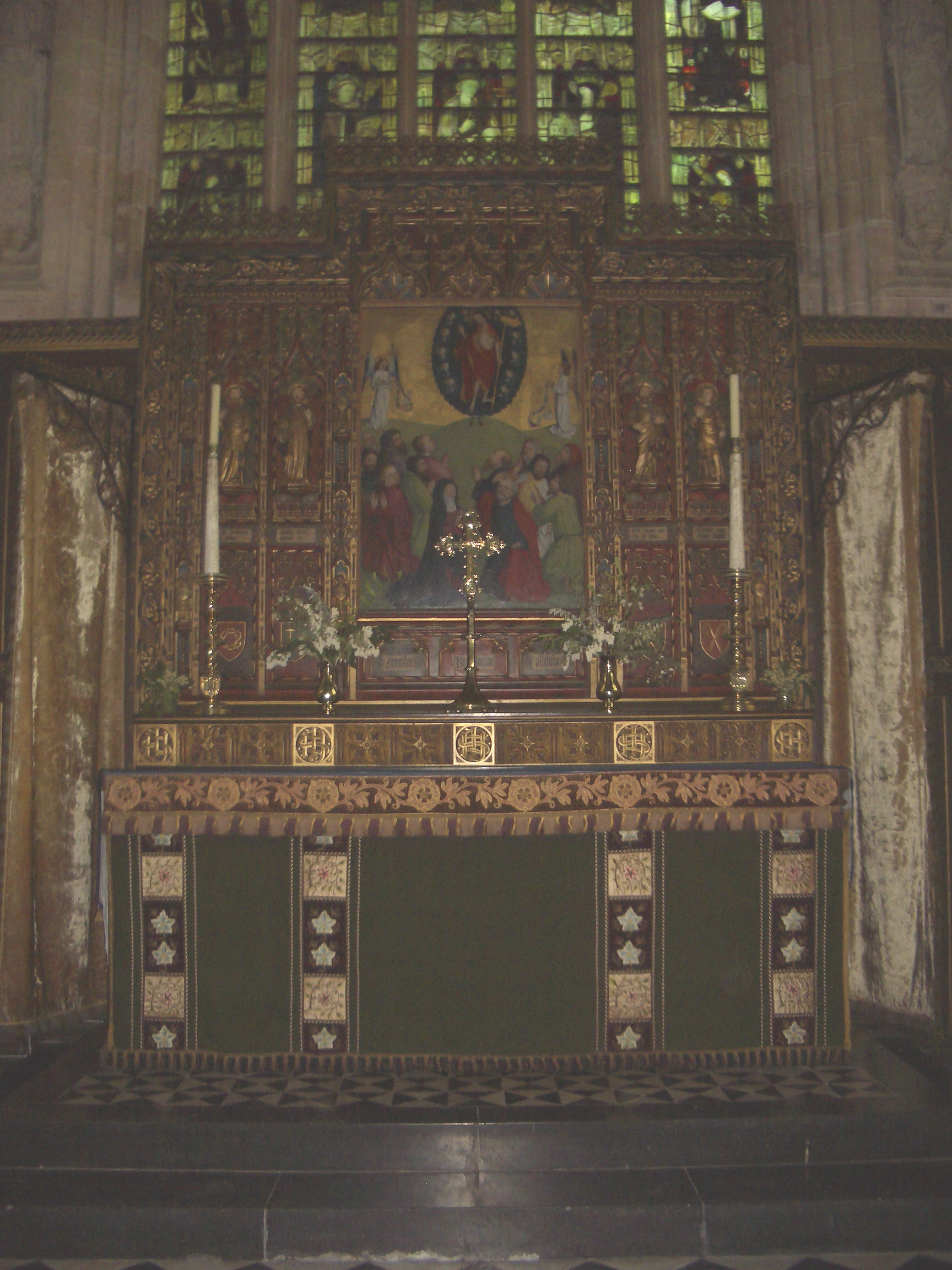

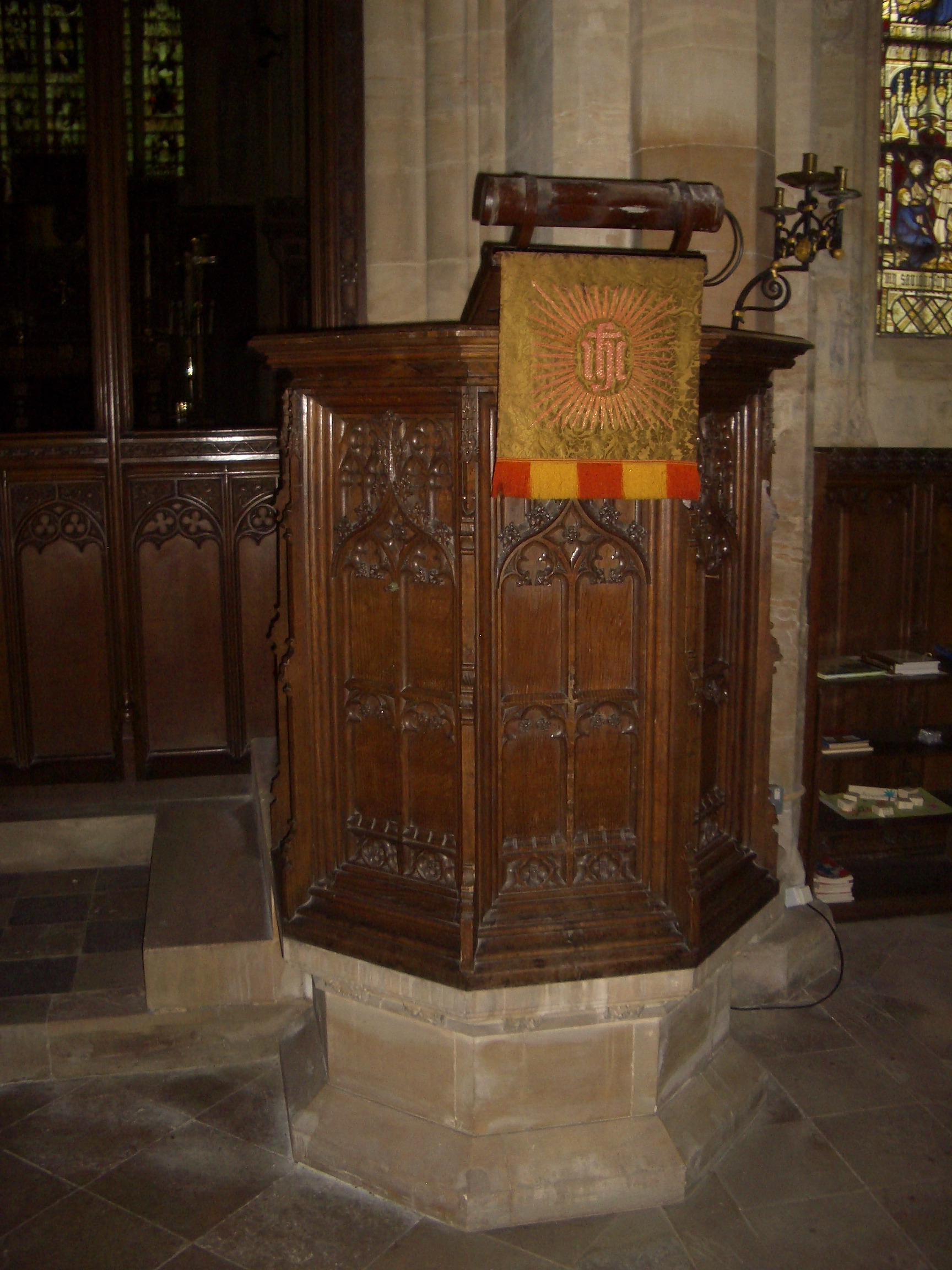

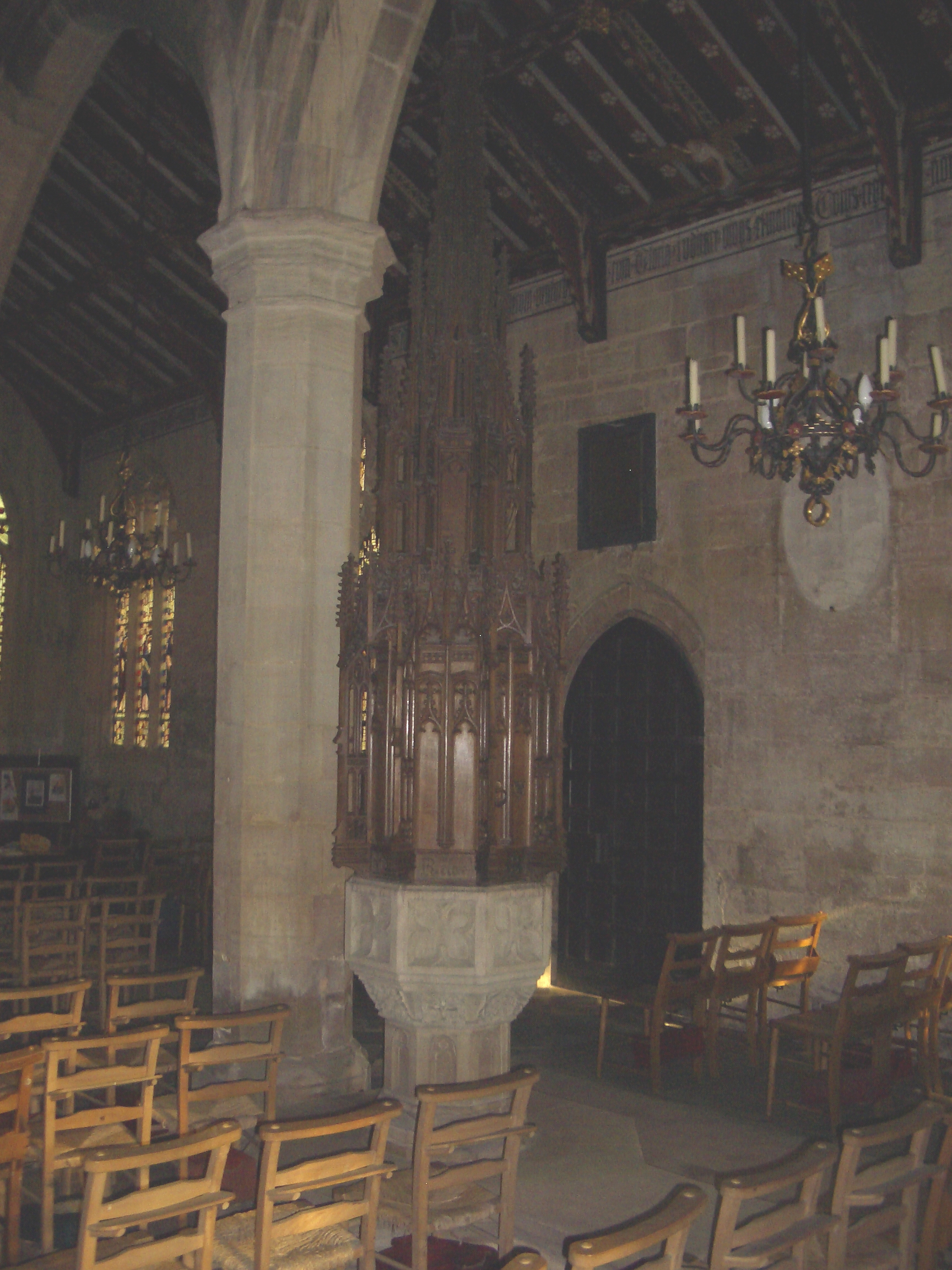

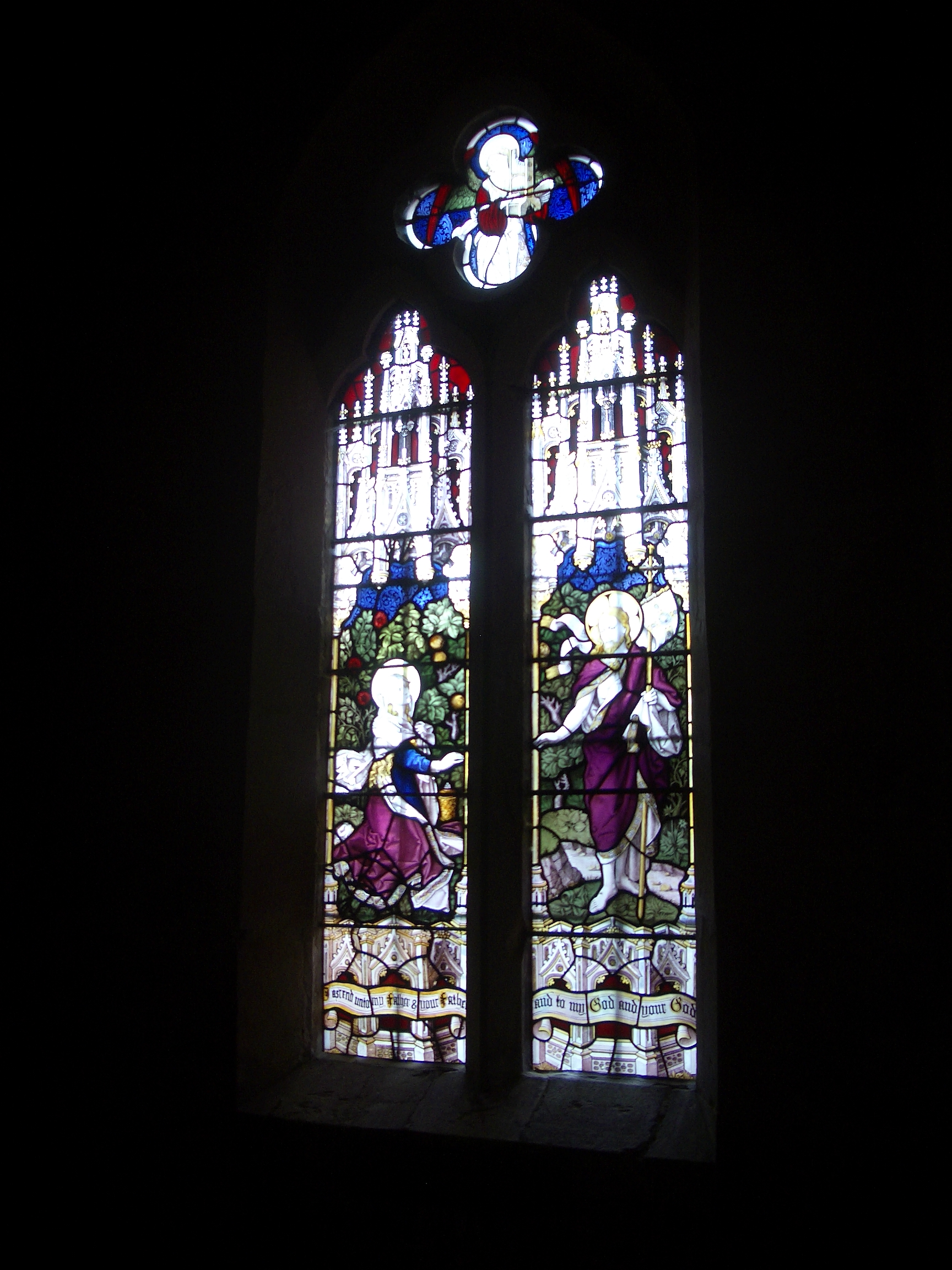

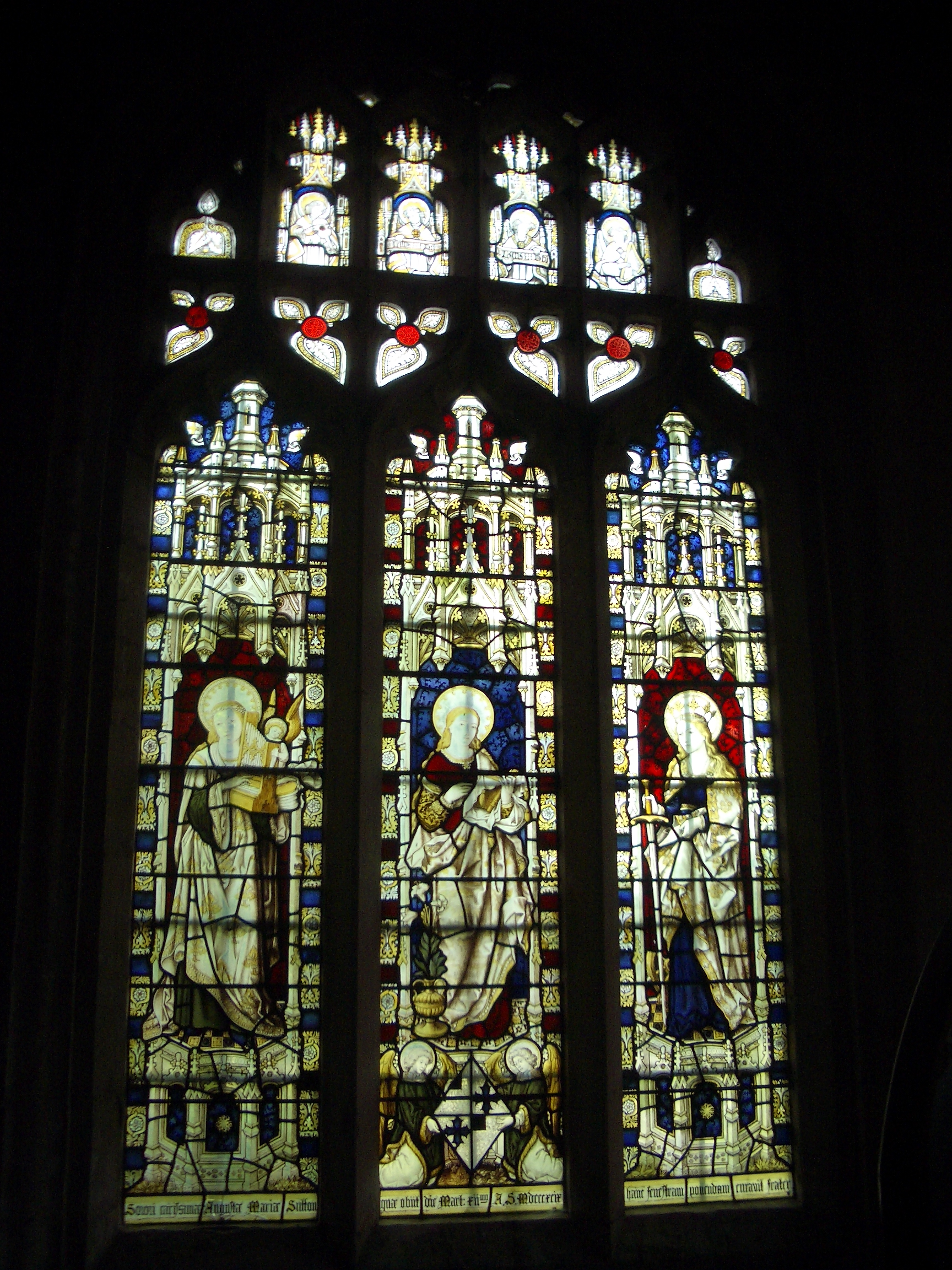

== Sources ==
- St. Helen's Church, Brant Broughton. Church guidebook.
- The Buildings of England, Lincolnshire. Pevsner.
