= Tom Earle =

Canadian author and teacher

- Born: February 12, 1966 (age 60); Orillia, Ontario, Canada
- Occupations: Author, Teacher, Hockey Player
- Writing career
- Genre: Children's literature

Tom Earle (born February 12, 1966) is a Canadian author and teacher. He is also a former ice hockey player.

== Hockey ==
He has played for many teams, such as Orillia Travelways, Barrie Colts, Dartmouth College and the Whitley Bay Warriors.

=== Career statistics ===
			Regular season					Playoffs
Season	Team	League	GP	G	A	Pts	PIM	GP	G	A	Pts	PIM
1985–86	Dartmouth College	ECACHL	12	1	1	2	25	—	—	—	—	—
1986–87	Whitley Bay Warriors	ENIHL	34	31	83	114	104	—	—	—	—	—

== Books ==
He has written two books to date.

- The Hat Trick, 2010, ISBN 1554686288
- Home Ice Advantage, 2013, ISBN 1443409049

== Personal life ==
He has 3 children named Nicolas, Lindsay and Lucas. He is married to Janet who is also a teacher.
