= William Earle (slave trader) =

English slave trader (1721–1788)

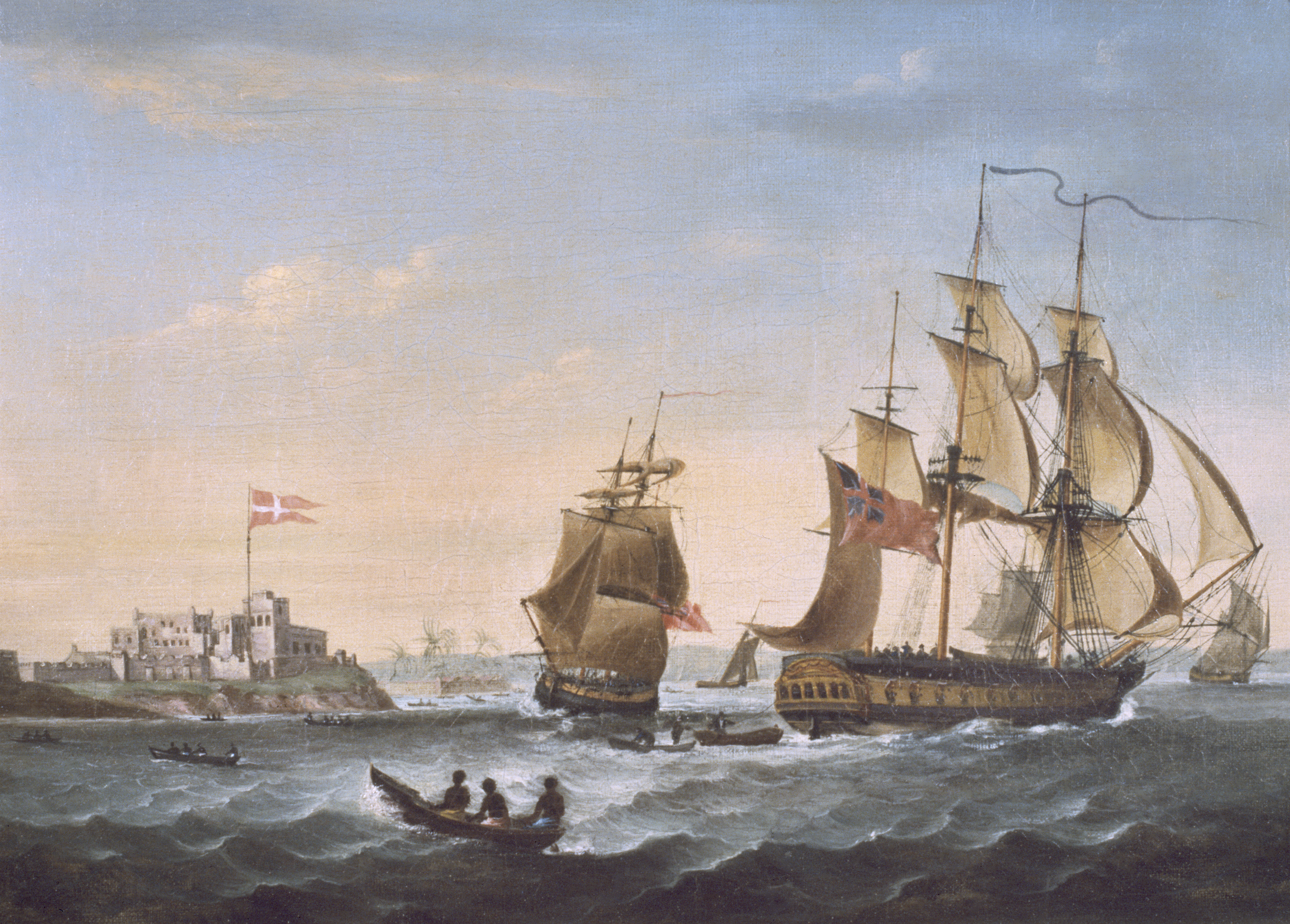
Two British slave-ships off Fort Christiansborg taking on board enslaved people, painting by George Webster

William Earle (1721–1788) was an English slave trader. In a career lasting 40 years he was responsible for at least 117 slave voyages and by the number of slave voyages he was the sixth most active slave trader in the period 1740–1790 from the Port of Liverpool.

== Family ==
The Earle family were heavily involved in the slave trade over several generations. William's father John Earle (1674–1749) began the family involvement.His father, John was an investor in what is believed to be the first slave ship to leave Liverpool legally engaging in the British slave trade. He is known to have invested in 13 slave voyages. Three of his four sons, William (born 1721), Thomas (born 1719) and Ralph (born 1715) were also involved. A number of streets and localities in Liverpool today are named after the Earles.

== Career ==
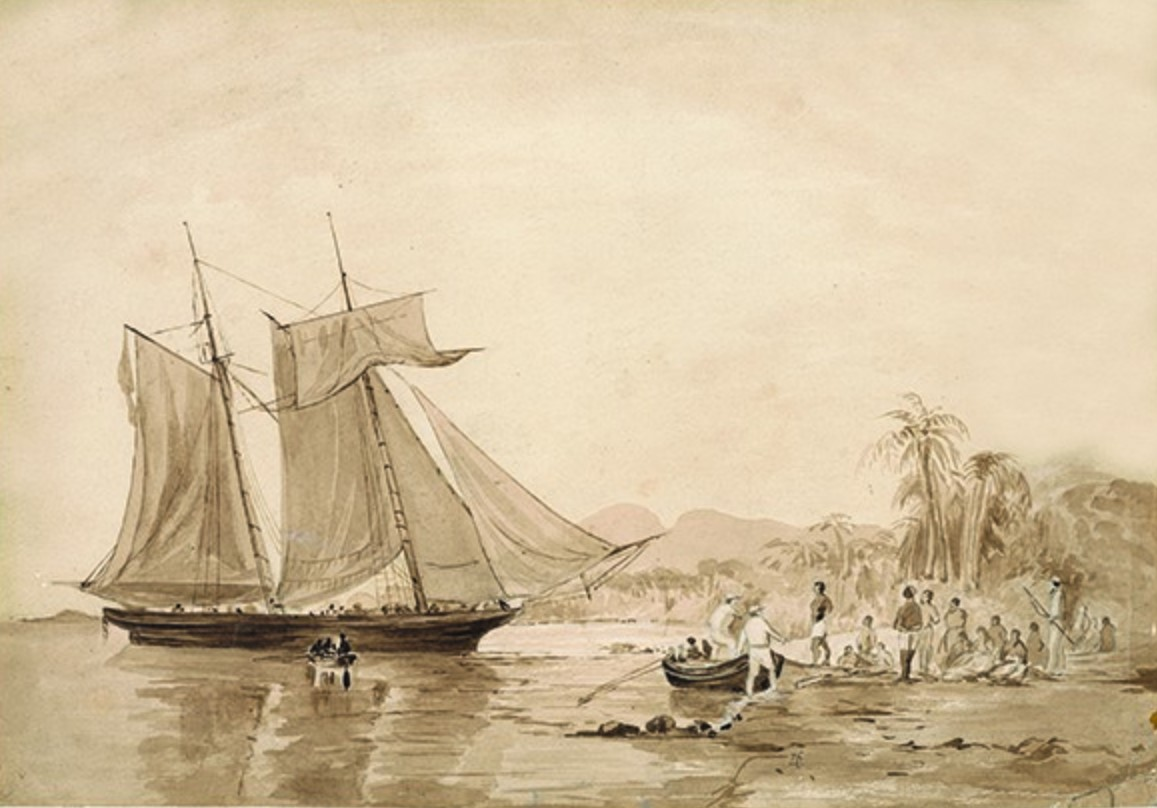
Slavers collecting enslaved people off the coast of Africa, drawing by Édouard Duncan

Earle began his career as a sailor. No information is recorded about his apprenticeship at sea but it was typical for a seaman to spend 8 or 10 years at sea before being given a first captaincy.

=== Slave trading ===
Earle was known to have been involved with at least 98 slave trading voyages.

William Earle's career in the slave trade began in 1748, age 26, as the captain of Lucy, a 60-ton snow on a slaving voyage to buy enslaved people from West Africa and to sell them in St Kitts. He bought 240 enslaved people, of whom 197 survived the journey, 43 died and were thrown into the sea.

In 1750, he was captain of another slave ship Chesterfield. A letter is preserved that records the owner's instructions to him. He was to proceed from the Isle of Man to Old Calabar and then "to barter our cargoe as per invoice annexed for slaves and elephants teeth." This voyage transported 331 enslaved people to St Kitts again.

While on the coast of West Africa, Earle and his crew were largely confined to the ship. There were trips on land for meals with local gentry and for fishing but this was not a regular occurrence. While at Old Calabar, Earle wrote a letter to his fiancé, Ann Wynstanley that has been preserved. There were four other ships from Liverpool and one from Bristol also in harbour. In the letter he describes spending each evening with the officers and sailors from the other ships, many of whom he knew personally. Not only did Earle know many of these men, some were also known to his future wife. Invariably these meetings also had a business agenda, in particular to ensure competition did not push up prices. The ships were only able to bring on board several enslaved people per day. This meant Earle was in situ for an extended period of time before setting sail to the Caribbean. Earle did not need security at first, but as the ship became more full, the victims were chained together below deck and armed guards set.

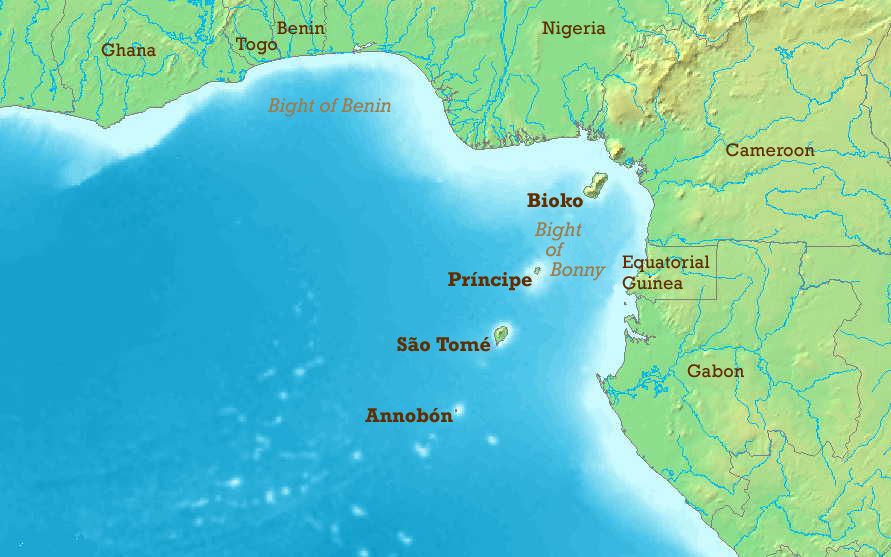
The Bight of Biafra was renamed the Bight of Bonny

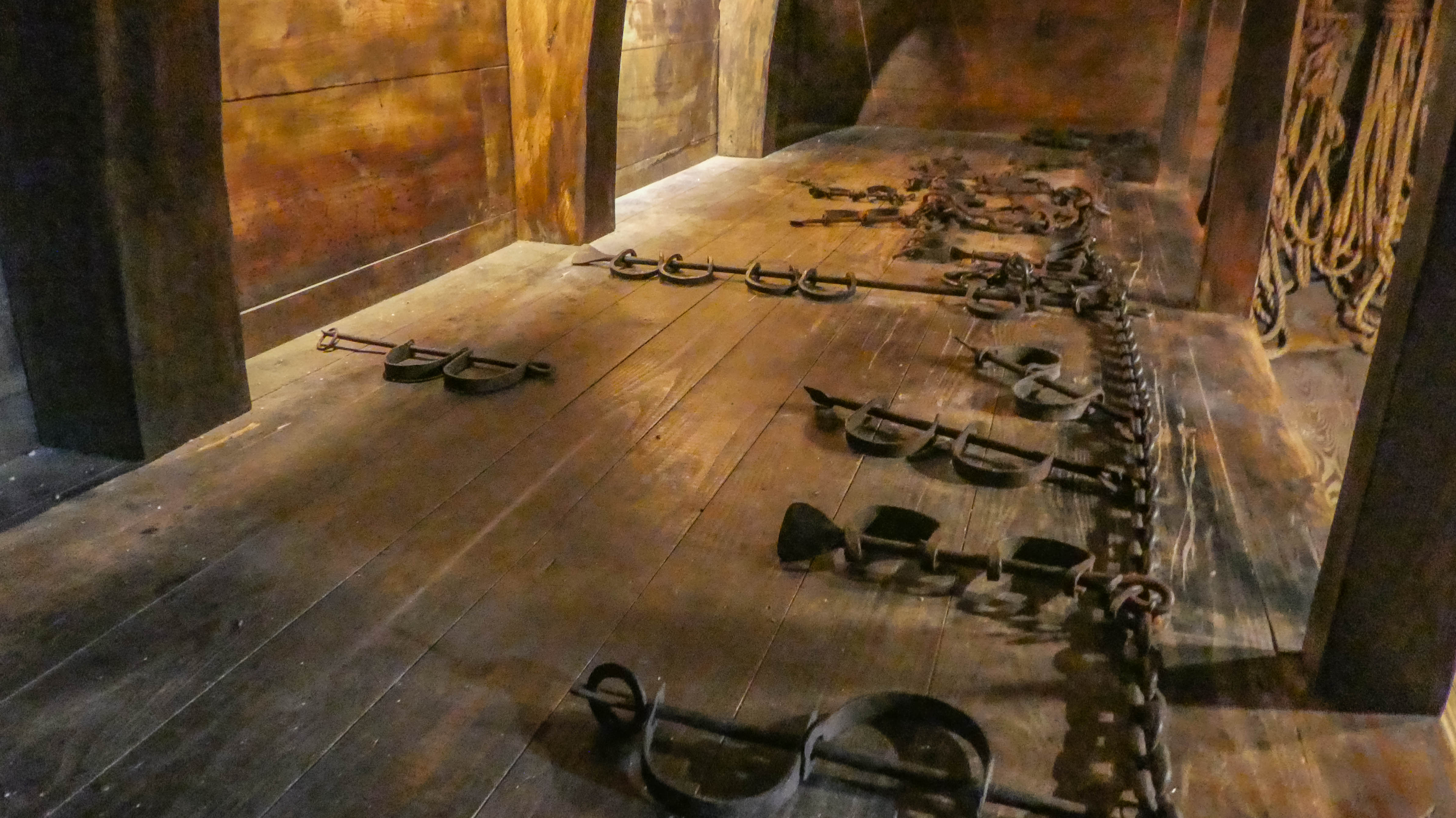
Slave shackles

Painting of a slave ship showing enslaved people chained up below deck

In his correspondence, Earle referred to slave traders, who bought and sold people for enslavement from the Bight of Biafra, as "Bite Men". The "Bite Men" were responsible for transporting almost 900,000 people to America between the 1740s and 1807, when abolition led to the end of the British slave trade.

=== Later career ===
Earle gave up captaincy and began his career as a slave-ship owner in 1754. He bought the Chesterfield which he had previously captained and which he sent between Liverpool and Calabar. He also bought Grampus, which he used to explore new slave routes along the West African coast. The two ships had a combined capacity for over 600 enslaved people.

Earle invested in slaves ships with at least 117 other people, each would take a part share of the ship and would share the profit or losses. Of these 117 people there were regular partners. These men were William Davenport who partnered with him 50 times, Patrick Black, Nehemiah Holland, Robert Jennings and Ambrose Lace.

Many of Earle's letters have been preserved and are located in the Earle Collection at the Merseyside Maritime Museum. The letters cover 20 months, from 23 January 1760 to 23 September 1761. The collection comprises just under 500 letters to about 100 correspondents written by William Earle and his clerks. The letters detail his business activities. About 10 percent of the letters were sent to Joseph Wimpey of Newgate Street in London. Wimpey supplied him with financial services and advice.

His slaving career lasted almost 40 years from the sailing of Lucy in June 1748 to the return to Liverpool of the Maria in May 1787.

== Personal life ==
William Earle married Ann Wynstanley. This connected him to two other slave traders, John Copeland and Robert Jennings, who had each married a Wynstanley sister. Ann Wynstanley was a widow whose attractions included a substantial dowry to add to what William had been able to save from his five years as a ship's captain.

Earle was living in Water Street in 1760, a residence in the business centre of Liverpool with accompanying inns, taverns and coffee houses. The residence was used as his counting house; his clerks worked there, and he offered merchants a room to live in while they were doing business in Liverpool. Earle had a warehouse on Strand Street and a shop where he sold retail goods.

Earle was a sufferer from gout, which confined him to his room for ten days or more three times between January 1760 and September 1761.

Earle improved the social standing of his offspring. His two sons Thomas and William became Liverpool slavers and inducted their own sons into the ranks of the landed gentry. When he retired, they took over his slaving business. William Earle (1759–1839), was responsible for at least 67 slave voyages, and Thomas Earle (1754–1822) was responsible for at least 73 slave voyages.

== Sources ==
- Earle, Peter (2015). The Earles of Liverpool. Liverpool, UK: Liverpool University Press.
- Radburn, Nicholas (2009). William Davenport, the Slave Trade, and Merchant Enterprise in Eighteenth-Century Liverpool (PDF) (MA). Victoria University of Wellington.
- Richardson, David (2007). Liverpool and Transatlantic Slavery. Liverpool, UK: Liverpool University Press. ISBN 978-1-84631-066-9.
