= Allerton Towers Park =

Public park in Liverpool

Coordinates: 53°22′10″N 02°52′38″W

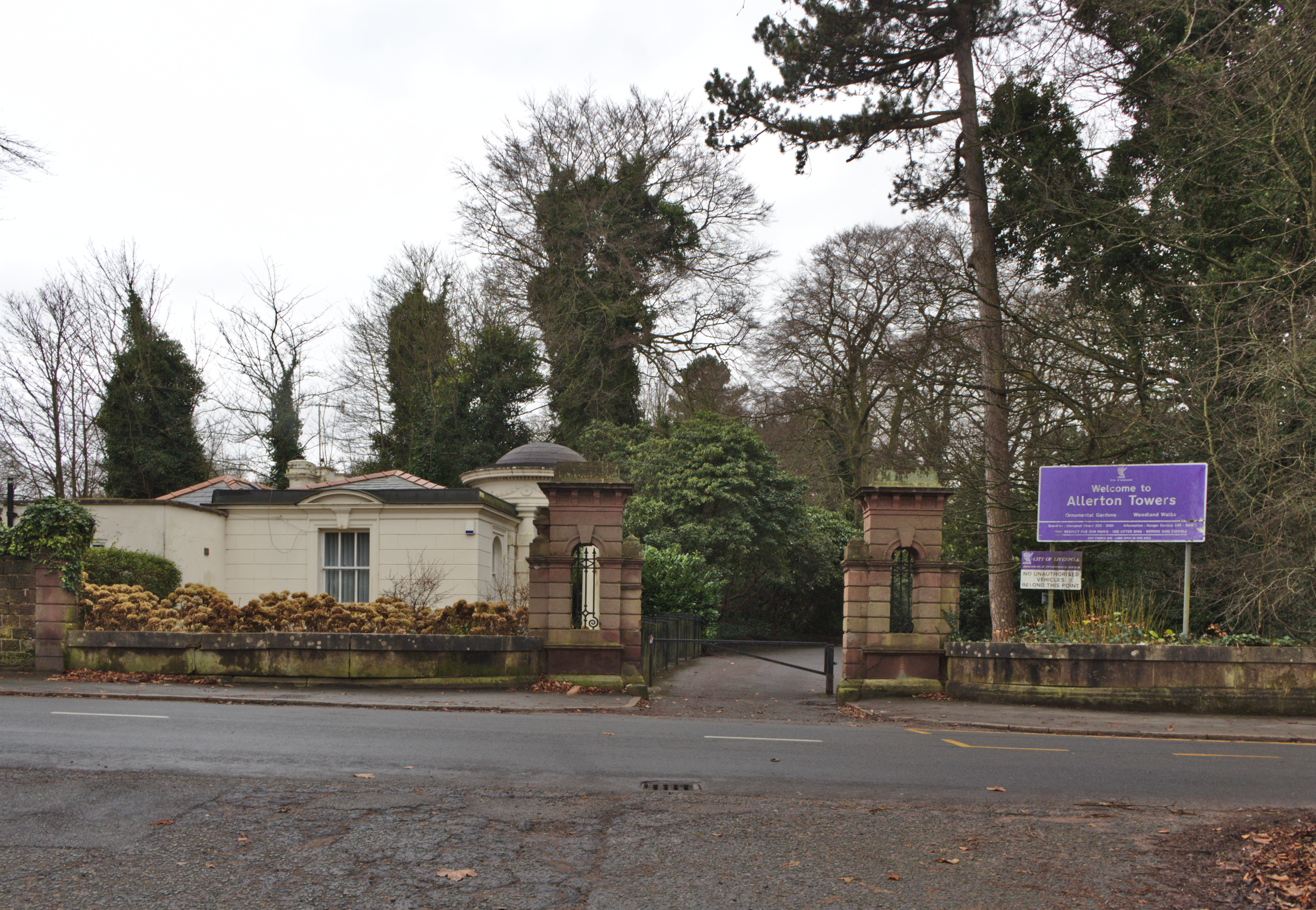
- Type: Public
- Location: Liverpool, England
- Area: 35 acres (140,000 m^{2})
- Website: liverpool.gov.uk/parks-and-greenspaces/local-parks-and-greenspaces/allerton-towers/

Allerton Towers Park is a public park in Allerton, Liverpool, in England.

== History ==
The park was part of the Manor of Allerton until Hardman Earle acquired the estate and introduced the eponymous mansion based on a design by Harvey Lonsdale Elmes, the famed architect of St George's Hall. The mansion was of classic Italianate design with a tower providing a view of the surrounding countryside. It was completed in 1849; two years after Elmes death.

Allerton Tower was also developed with other notable architectural features including an orangery, stables and a neoclassical lodge.

The estate was acquired by Liverpool Corporation in 1924, and the landscaped gardens were opened to the public as Allerton Tower Park in 1927. By 1937 the tower itself had become seriously affected by dry rot and was demolished.

== Current park layout ==
The park lies between Woolton Road and Menlove Avenue and covers an area of 35 acres. The lodge, stables and laundry block and part of the orangery of Allerton Tower remain and are Grade II listed buildings. There is also a partially walled garden adding seasonal interest to one of Liverpool's former park estates.
