= 2019 East Lindsey District Council election =

2019 UK local government election

Results of the 2019 East Lindsey District Council election

The 2019 East Lindsey District Council election took place on 2 May 2019 to elect all members of East Lindsey District Council in England. The Conservatives retained overall control of the council.

== Results summary ==
East Lindsey District Council Election Result 2019
Party	Seats	Gains	Losses	Net gain/loss	Seats %	Votes %	Votes	+/−
Conservative	29	5	9	-4	52.73	49.72	20,941	+8.32
Independent	12	7	1	+6	21.82	14.98	6,307	+6.42
Labour	7	3	0	+3	12.72	23.07	9,718	+6.00
Skegness Urban District Society	6	6	0	+6	10.91	9.38	3,960	+9.38
Liberal Democrats	1	0	0	N/C	1.82	2.15	907	+0.09
Lincolnshire Independent	0	-	-	0	0.00	0.70	295	-4.27

== Council composition ==
Following the last election in 2015, the composition of the council was:

↓
33	8	6	4	3	1
Conservative	UKIP	IND	Lab	LI	LD

After the election, the composition of the council was:

↓
29	12	7	6	1
Conservative	Independent	Labour	SUDS	LD

IND - Independent
Lab - Labour
LI - Lincolnshire Independents
LD - Liberal Democrats
SUDS - Skegness Urban District Society

== Ward results ==
Incumbent councillors are denoted by an asterisk (*). References -

=== Alford ===
Alford (2 seats)
Party	Candidate	Votes	%	±%
Conservative	Sarah Devereux*	671	69.03	
Conservative	Graham Anthony Marsh*	585	60.19	
Labour	Jean Shutt	306	31.48	
Turnout			27.73	−33.84
Conservative hold		Swing		
Conservative gain from Lincolnshire Independent		Swing		

Devereux was previously elected as a Lincolnshire Independents councillor. A total of 66 ballots were rejected.

=== Binbrook ===
Binbrook (1 seat)
Party	Candidate	Votes	%	±%
Conservative	Richard Geoffrey Fry*	496	77.50	+5.50
Labour	David Southall	144	22.50	−5.50
Majority		352	55.00	+11.00
Turnout		640	33.25	−35.41
Conservative hold		Swing		

A total of 32 ballots were rejected.

=== Burgh Le Marsh ===
Burgh Le Marsh (1 seat)
Party	Candidate	Votes	%	±%
Skegness Urban District Society	Jimmy Brookes	393	61.02	+28.37
Conservative	Neil Douglas Luther Cooper*	251	38.98	−6.92
Majority		142	22.04	
Turnout		644	32.16	−31.74
Skegness Urban District Society gain from Conservative		Swing		

A total of 7 ballots were rejected.

=== Chapel St Leonards ===
Chapel St Leonards (2 seats)
Party	Candidate	Votes	%	±%
Conservative	Paul Anthony Hibbert-Greaves*	537	54.74	
Conservative	Mel Turton-Leivers*	506	51.58	
Labour	Fiona Mary Brown	412	42.00	
Labour	Tony Cox	350	35.68	
Turnout			26.56	−31.47
Conservative hold		Swing		
Conservative hold		Swing		

A total of 76 ballots were rejected.

=== Coningsby & Mareham ===
Coningsby & Mareham (3 seats)
Party	Candidate	Votes	%	±%
Conservative	Stan Avison*	Unopposed		
Conservative	Martin Foster*	Unopposed		
Conservative	Alex Hall	Unopposed		
Conservative hold		Swing		
Conservative gain from UKIP		Swing		
Conservative gain from Independent		Swing		

Foster was previously elected as an independent councillor.

=== Croft ===
Croft (1 seat)
Party	Candidate	Votes	%	±%
Conservative	Sid Dennis	406	64.25	−3.27
Independent	Eric Gordon Peacock	130	20.57	N/A
Labour	April Rosemary Jagger	48	7.59	N/A
Skegness Urban District Society	Tom Noble	48	7.59	N/A
Majority		276	43.68	+8.64
Turnout		632	33.25	−30.33
Conservative hold		Swing		

A total of 6 ballots were rejected

=== Friskney ===
Friskney (1 seat)
Party	Candidate	Votes	%	±%
Independent	Carleen Dickinson*	269	53.48	+3.00
Conservative	Tom Tuplin	178	35.39	−14.13
Labour	Andy Allen	56	11.13	N/A
Majority		91	18.09	
Turnout		503	29.22	−34.53
Independent gain from UKIP		Swing		

Dickinson was previously elected as a UKIP councillor. A total of 8 ballots were rejected.

=== Fulstow ===
Fulstow (1 seat)
Party	Candidate	Votes	%	±%
Independent	Edward Peel Mossop	496	64.92	N/A
Conservative	Julie Anne Wetton	194	25.39	−35.94
Labour	Jason Garrett	74	9.69	−7.40
Majority		302	39.53	
Turnout		764	38.93	−34.61
Independent gain from Conservative		Swing		

A total of 9 ballots were rejected.

=== Grimoldby ===
Grimoldby (1 seat)
Party	Candidate	Votes	%	±%
Independent	Terry Knowles	432	75.26	+23.13
Labour	Sue Partridge	142	24.74	+15.01
Majority		290	50.52	+21.85
Turnout		574	32.50	−35.37
Independent hold		Swing		

A total of 8 ballots were rejected.

=== Hagworthingham ===
Hagworthingham (1 seat)
Party	Candidate	Votes	%	±%
Conservative	Will Grover*	457	79.48	+11.29
Labour	Rae Rigby	118	20.52	N/A
Majority		339	58.96	+22.58
Turnout		575	33.11	−38.32
Conservative hold		Swing		

A total of 54 ballots were rejected.

=== Halton Holegate ===
Halton Holegate (1 seat)
Party	Candidate	Votes	%	±%
Independent	Jim Swanson*	489	67.17	+25.94
Conservative	Nigel Richard Welton	180	24.73	−5.96
Labour	Julia Mary Southall	59	8.10	N/A
Majority		309	42.44	+31.90
Turnout		728	34.03	−36.18
Independent hold		Swing		

A total of 9 ballots were rejected.

=== Holton Le Clay & North Thoresby ===
Holton Le Clay & North Thoresby (2 seats)
Party	Candidate	Votes	%	±%
Labour	Phyll Smith	Unopposed		
Independent	Terry Aldridge*	Unopposed		
Labour gain from Conservative		Swing		
Independent gain from Lincolnshire Independent		Swing		

Aldridge was previously elected as a Lincolnshire Independent Councillor.

=== Horncastle ===
Horncastle (3 seats)
Party	Candidate	Votes	%	±%
Liberal Democrats	Fiona Margaret Martin*	907	55.00	
Independent	Sandra Campbell-Wardman*	772	46.82	
Conservative	Richard Martin Avison*	687	41.66	
Labour	Dominic James Hinkins	507	30.75	N/A
Conservative	Craig Dean Moore	499	30.26	N/A
Conservative	Sean Roger Matthews	352	21.35	N/A
Turnout			28.65	−37.44
Liberal Democrats hold		Swing		
Independent hold		Swing		
Conservative hold		Swing		

A total of 29 ballots were rejected.

=== Ingoldmells ===
Ingoldmells (1 seat)
Party	Candidate	Votes	%	±%
Conservative	Colin John Davie*	244	49.10	+7.67
Skegness Urban District Society	Steve Walmsley	169	34.00	N/A
Labour	Philip Ernest Sturman	84	16.90	−9.77
Majority		75	15.10	+4.66
Turnout		497	30.30	−29.84
Conservative hold		Swing		

A total of 3 ballots were rejected.

=== Legbourne ===
Legbourne (1 seat)
Party	Candidate	Votes	%	±%
Conservative	Adam Grist*	560	79.32	+5.68
Labour	David Richard Hoyles	146	20.68	N/A
Majority		414	58.64	+11.36
Turnout		706	39.13	−31.87
Conservative hold		Swing		

A total of 25 ballots were rejected.

=== Mablethorpe ===
Mablethorpe (3 seats)
Party	Candidate	Votes	%	±%
Labour	Graham Cullen*	989	54.25	
Labour	Tony Howard*	848	46.52	
Labour	Claire Newman	720	39.50	
Conservative	Terence Brown	649	35.60	
Conservative	Stephanie Jane Carruthers	627	34.39	
Independent	Helena Marie Poskitt	430	23.59	N/A
Turnout			28.56	−31.95
Labour gain from UKIP		Swing		
Labour hold		Swing		
Labour hold		Swing		

Brown was previously elected as a UKIP councillor. A total of 47 ballots were rejected.

=== Marsh Chapel & Somercotes ===
Marsh Chapel & Somercotes (2 seats)
Party	Candidate	Votes	%	±%
Conservative	Daniel McNally*	693	62.38	
Conservative	Paul John Rickett	473	42.57	
Independent	Sandra Elizabeth Dykes	419	37.71	N/A
Labour	Trisha Newman	177	15.93	
Turnout			30.63	−35.42
Conservative hold		Swing		
Conservative gain from UKIP		Swing		

A total of 13 ballots were rejected.

=== North Holme ===
North Holme (1 seat)
Party	Candidate	Votes	%	±%
Labour	David James Ernest Hall	217	42.72	−4.34
Conservative	Fran Treanor*	196	38.58	−14.36
Independent	Maurice Bellwood	95	18.70	N/A
Majority		21	4.14	
Turnout		508	28.17	−27.73
Labour gain from Conservative		Swing		

A total of 5 ballots were rejected.

=== Priory & St James ===
Priory & St James (2 seats)
Party	Candidate	Votes	%	±%
Labour	Sarah Rosemary Parkin	715	58.13	
Independent	Andrew Leonard	614	49.92	
Conservative	Pauline Frances Watson*	391	31.79	
Turnout			33.37	−27.07
Labour hold		Swing		
Independent gain from Conservative		Swing		

A total of 13 ballots were rejected.

=== Roughton ===
Roughton (1 seat)
Party	Candidate	Votes	%	±%
Conservative	William Gray	462	79.79	+79.79
Labour	Stuart Jameson	117	20.21	N/A
Majority		345	59.58	
Turnout		579	31.90	
Conservative hold		Swing		

A total of 41 ballots were rejected.

=== Scarbrough & Seacroft ===
Scarbrough & Seacroft (3 seats)
Party	Candidate	Votes	%	±%
Skegness Urban District Society	Billy Brookes	631	40.76	N/A
Conservative	Dick Edginton*	629	40.63	
Conservative	Steve Kirk*	588	37.98	
Skegness Urban District Society	Paul Sutton	539	34.82	N/A
Skegness Urban District Society	Bob Walker	509	32.88	N/A
Conservative	Colin Wright	437	28.23	N/A
Labour	Maggie Gray	346	22.35	
Labour	Kevin Martin Evans	283	18.28	N/A
Turnout			23.08	−31.97
Skegness Urban District Society gain from UKIP		Swing		
Conservative hold		Swing		
Conservative hold		Swing		

A total of 14 ballots were rejected.

=== Sibsey & Stickney ===
Sibsey & Stickney (2 seats)
Party	Candidate	Votes	%	±%
Conservative	Tom Ashton*	863	75.50	
Conservative	Neil John Jones*	758	66.32	
Labour	Danyelle Farrell	242	21.17	N/A
Turnout			29.76	−38.32
Conservative hold		Swing		
Conservative hold		Swing		

A total of 77 ballots were spoiled.

=== Spilsby ===
Spilsby (1 seat)
Party	Candidate	Votes	%	±%
Independent	David Mangion	274	52.29	N/A
Conservative	Rod Williams*	181	34.54	−10.22
Labour	Laura Stephenson	69	13.17	−11.54
Majority		93	17.75	
Turnout		524	23.11	
Independent gain from Conservative		Swing		

A total of 9 ballots were rejected.

=== St Clements ===
St Clements (2 seats)
Party	Candidate	Votes	%	±%
Skegness Urban District Society	Mark Vincent Dannatt*	390	41.89	
Skegness Urban District Society	Richard Cunnington	361	38.76	N/A
Conservative	Susan Anita Jane Blackburn	307	32.98	
Conservative	Jim Carpenter	296	31.79	
Labour	Mark Crawford Anderson	205	22.02	
Labour	Phil Gaskell	164	17.62	N/A
Turnout			24.13	−29.51
Skegness Urban District Society gain from UKIP		Swing		
Skegness Urban District Society gain from Conservative		Swing		

Dannatt was previously elected as a UKIP Councillor. A total of 10 ballots were rejected.

=== St Margarets ===
St Margarets (1 seat)
Party	Candidate	Votes	%	±%
Conservative	Chris Green*	290	50.88	+8.65
Labour	Dominic Paul Sivell	166	29.12	−6.26
Independent	Alastair Meiklejon	114	20.00	N/A
Majority		124	21.76	+14.91
Turnout		570	29.34	−35.68
Conservative hold		Swing		

A total of 6 ballots were rejected.

=== St Marys ===
St Marys (1 seat)
Party	Candidate	Votes	%	±%
Independent	Jill Makinson-Sanders*	647	93.10	+34.81
Labour	Ellie Green	48	6.90	−6.73
Majority		599	86.20	+55.99
Turnout		695	37.85	−28.64
Independent hold		Swing		

A total of 4 ballots were rejected.

=== St Michaels ===
St Michaels (1 seat)
Party	Candidate	Votes	%	±%
Independent	George Horton*	401	68.20	+23.53
Labour	Jim Drake	187	31.80	+11.47
Majority		214	36.40	+26.73
Turnout		588	33.52	−33.67
Independent hold		Swing		

A total of 4 ballots were rejected.

=== Sutton on Sea ===
Sutton on Sea (2 seats)
Party	Candidate	Votes	%	±%
Conservative	Helen Angela Matthews*	890	64.40	
Conservative	Adrian Victor Benjamin	886	64.11	
Labour	Steve Holland	392	28.36	
Turnout			37.81	−31.01
Conservative gain from Lincolnshire Independent		Swing		
Conservative hold		Swing		

A total of 115 ballots were rejected.

=== Tetford & Donington ===
Tetford & Donington (1 seat)
Party	Candidate	Votes	%	±%
Conservative	David George Andrews*	479	55.51	+21.85
Lincolnshire Independent	Daniel Anthony Simpson	295	34.18	+4.31
Labour	Robert John Pearce	89	10.31	N/A
Majority		184	21.33	+17.54
Turnout		863	43.93	−31.03
Conservative hold		Swing		

A total of 13 ballots were rejected.

=== Tetney ===
Tetney (1 seat)
Party	Candidate	Votes	%	±%
Independent	Steve McMillan	214	36.03	N/A
Conservative	Stuart Watson*	209	35.18	−17.72
Independent	Chris Frear	118	19.87	N/A
Labour	Ellen Wright	53	8.92	N/A
Majority		5	0.85	
Turnout		594	31.72	−26.84
Independent gain from Conservative		Swing		

A total of 3 ballots were rejected.

=== Trinity ===
Trinity (1 seat)
Party	Candidate	Votes	%	±%
Labour	Ros Jackson*	244	55.33	+16.30
Independent	Julia Mary Simmons	122	27.66	N/A
Conservative	David Michael Ford	75	17.01	−8.29
Majority		122	27.67	+13.94
Turnout		441	25.92	−26.54
Labour hold		Swing		

A total of 5 ballots were rejected.

=== Wainfleet ===
Wainfleet (1 seat)
Party	Candidate	Votes	%	±%
Conservative	Wendy Bowkett*	395	76.11	+29.38
Labour	Paula Louise Clarke	124	23.89	+7.87
Majority		271	52.22	+29.90
Turnout		519	28.18	−31.28
Conservative hold		Swing		

A total of 35 ballots were rejected.

=== Willoughby with Sloothby ===
Willoughby with Sloothby (1 seat)
Party	Candidate	Votes	%	±%
Independent	Stephen William Eyre	485	62.82	+20.20
Conservative	Colin Matthews	223	28.89	−15.85
Labour	Graham Victor Burnby-Crouch	64	8.29	−4.35
Majority		262	33.93	+31.81
Turnout		772	38.81	−28.75
Independent gain from Conservative		Swing		

A total of 13 ballots were rejected.

=== Winthorpe ===
Winthorpe (2 seats)
Party	Candidate	Votes	%	±%
Skegness Urban District Society	Danny Brookes*	514	51.76	
Skegness Urban District Society	Trevor Burnham	396	39.88	N/A
Conservative	Carl Stuart Macey	324	32.63	
Labour	Judi Gaskell	223	22.46	N/A
Conservative	Ricky Shashikant	205	20.64	N/A
Labour	Ian Dutton	174	17.52	N/A
Turnout			23.02	−30.55
Skegness Urban District Society gain from UKIP		Swing		
Skegness Urban District Society gain from UKIP		Swing		

Brookes was previously elected as a UKIP councillor. A total of 26 ballots were rejected.

=== Withern & Theddlethorpe ===
Withern & Theddlethorpe (1 seat)
Party	Candidate	Votes	%	±%
Conservative	Sandra Diane Harrison	409	62.16	+62.16
Independent	Stephen Alan Kirby	187	28.42	N/A
Labour	Hilary Barbara Powell	62	9.42	N/A
Majority		222	33.74	
Turnout		658	33.66	
Conservative hold		Swing		

A total of 28 ballots were rejected.

=== Woodhall Spa ===
Woodhall Spa (2 seats)
Party	Candidate	Votes	%	±%
Conservative	Craig James Leyland*	956	81.09	
Conservative	Thomas James Kemp	797	67.60	
Labour	John Robert Alexander	223	18.91	
Turnout			33.42	−36.31
Conservative hold		Swing		
Conservative hold		Swing		

A total of 46 ballots were rejected.

=== Wragby ===
Wragby (1 seat)
Party	Candidate	Votes	%	±%
Conservative	Julie Platt	450	77.45	+21.78
Labour	Graham Archer	131	22.55	N/A
Majority		319	54.90	+43.56
Turnout		581	29.90	−39.85
Conservative hold		Swing		

A total of 25 ballots were rejected.

== Changes 2019–2023 ==
Sarah Parkin, elected for Labour in the Priory and St James' ward, left the party later in 2019 to sit as an independent.

David Mangion, elected as an independent in Spilsby ward, joined the Conservatives in 2020.

=== Chapel St. Leonard's, 2021 ===
Chapel St. Leonard's: 6 May 2021
Party	Candidate	Votes	%	±%
Conservative	Graham Williams	795	67.4	
Labour	Isaac Bailey	206	17.5	
Skegness Urban District Society	Ady Findley	121	10.3	
Independent	Steve Walmsley	58	4.9	
Majority		589		
Conservative hold				

By-election triggered by resignation of Conservative councillor Mel Turton-Leivers.

=== Chapel St. Leonard's, 2022 ===
Chapel St. Leonard's: 13 January 2022
Party	Candidate	Votes	%	±%
Conservative	Stephen Evans	436	62.9	+5.4
Independent	David Fenton	267	38.0	N/A
Majority		169	24.9	
Turnout		708	18.0	
Conservative hold		Swing	▼16.3	

=== Halton Holegate ===
Halton Holegate: 3 March 2022
Party	Candidate	Votes	%	±%
Conservative	Terence Taylor	306	66.2	▲41.47
Labour	Keziah Wood	156	33.8	▲25.70
Majority		150	32.5	▼9.94
Turnout		469	21.80	▼12.23
Conservative gain from Independent		Swing		
