= RAF Wainfleet =

Former RAF station in Lincolnshire, England

Coordinates: 53.0718°N 0.2132°E

- Near Wainfleet, Lincolnshire in UK
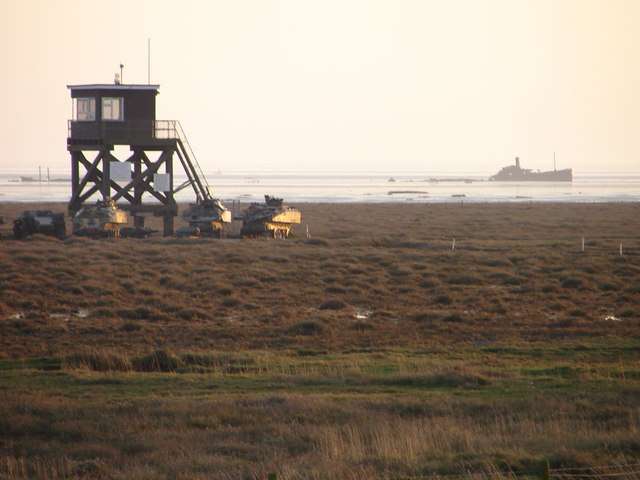
- Tower and Targets, RAF Wainfleet

Site information
- Type: NATO Air Weapons Range
- Operator: Defence Training Estates (East)
- Status: Closed

Location
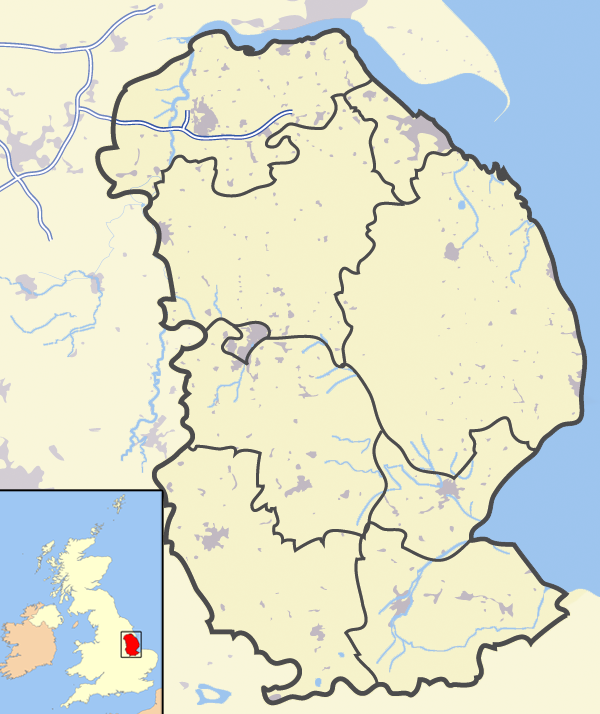

Site history
- In use: August 1938 – June 2010

Airfield information
- Identifiers: ICAO: ~~EGYW~~

RAF Wainfleet was a Royal Air Force weapons range on The Wash on the east coast of England near Wainfleet, in the civil parish of Friskney, although the north-east part of the range was in Wainfleet St Mary. Other ranges nearby include RAF Holbeach, also on The Wash, and RAF Donna Nook. It was also known as The Wash (North side) Bombing Range. It was only a few miles south-west of Gibraltar Point.

== History ==
The range opened to aerial operations in August 1938; but had previously been used as a range from 1890 by the 1st Lincolnshire Artillery. However, there is evidence that the area was in use for military practice as far back as Napoleonic times when the River Steeping was navigable and Wainfleet itself was an important harbour.

During the 1920s and 1930s it was also used by the RAF and Royal Artillery. The range was administered by RAF Coningsby as an Air Weapons Range within RAF Strike Command.During the Second World War, it was used by 617 Squadron to test the Stabilised Automatic Bomb Sight. Postwar, it was used by both fixed wing and rotary aircraft from NATO. On 1 April 2006 control was transferred to Defence Estates and the range was then administered by Defence Training Estates (East) from their headquarters at West Tofts Camp near Thetford.

Due to funding cuts the range was closed for operations on 2 December 2009 and finally closed in July 2010.

The tower and some surrounding buildings reopened as holiday accommodation in 2017.

== Aircraft incidents ==
=== 1951 crashes ===
On 22 January 1951 a Mosquito crashed from 139 Sqn at RAF Hemswell, with the pilot killed, and the navigator injured.

On 6 February 1951, a Mosquito crashed from 139 Sqn at RAF Hemswell, with two aircrew killed.

=== 1952 mid-air collision ===
On Friday 18 April 1952 at 3.12 pm, two F-84 Canadair Sabres, from the RCAF, had a mid-air collision at 19,000ft, of 410 Squadron. Both pilots were killed, from RAF North Luffenham.

- Flying Officer Arthur Edgar Rayner baled out, being picked up by the Skegness lifeboat, he was in the water for one hour 30 minutes, was unconscious, taken to Boston by the RAF, but died on the way there
- Flying Officer Joseph Austin Leslie Kerr died

=== 1974 Buccaneer crash ===
On Monday 11 November 1974 at 5pm, Buccaneer 'XV351' from 809 Naval Air Squadron of HMS Ark Royal crashed, with the pilot killed, Lieutenant Stephen Kershaw 28 from Sheffield. The navigator injured his back. Two seamen dived into the sea to save the navigator, 24 year old John Holland and 21 year old Michael Green; Michael Green later received the King’s Gallantry Medal.

=== 1975 F-111 crash ===
On Wednesday 5 November 1975 at 4.11 pm, F-111 '68-0060' had a bird strike over the range. Both pilots ejected, who were picked up by two Boston fishermen and were taken to the Pilgrim Hospital.

- Capt James E. Stieber, pilot
- Capt Robert Gregory, WSO

=== 1981 A-10 crash ===
A USAF Fairchild Republic A-10 Thunderbolt II aircraft crashed on Friday 8 May 1981 at 2.45 pm near Friskney. First Lt Henry Louis Gagne died in RAF Nocton Hall several hours later.

=== 1990 F-111 crash ===
On Monday 5 February 1990 at 5.30 pm, a USAF General Dynamics F-111 Aardvark aircraft crashed. One pilot was found at 7 pm by a boat from Boston. The Skegness lifeboat was looking for the other pilot. The pilot was found three days later strapped in the seat.

== Operation ==
The site was controlled from the Control Tower. Targets included old ships. There were two smaller wooden observation towers to the east nearer the shore but these were demolished in 2009. Access was via a narrow road called Sea Lane via the junction with the A52 at the Barley Mow at Friskney Eaudyke.

=== Weapons clearance ===
The site was cleared daily by the Explosive Ordnance Disposal team from RAF Coningsby. Although the range has finally closed unrecovered ordnance and unexploded ordnance will remain for many years.

=== SSSI ===
The range area is a Site of Special Scientific Interest thanks to the large number of resident and migrating birds found there. The location is a major stopping point for flocks of brent geese on their way from the Arctic coast. There is also the red-legged partridge. Skegness gets its weather recorded from the automatic equipment at Wainfleet.
