= River Lymn =

River in Lincolnshire, England

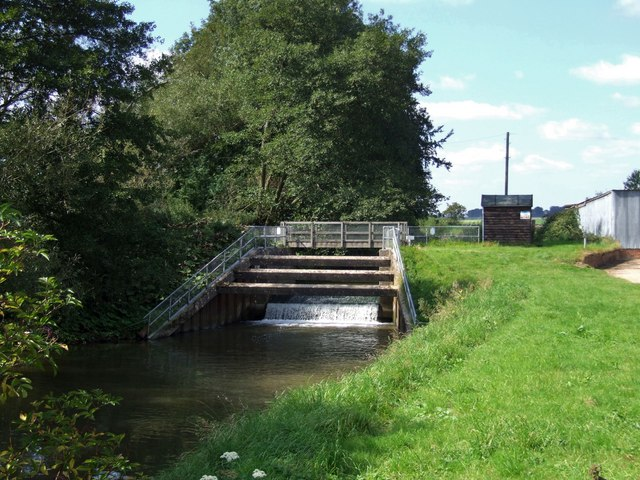
- The weir at Mill Farm, Partney

Location
- Country: England
- Counties: Lincolnshire

Physical characteristics
- Source
  - location: Belchford
  - elevation: 300 ft (91 m)
- Mouth: Steeping River
  - location: Gibraltar Point

The River Lymn is a river in Lincolnshire, England. It rises in the Wolds on the eastern slope of Castcliffe Hill in Fulletby parish. It flows south-eastwards to the Lincolnshire Marsh, where it becomes known as the Steeping River on the boundary of Great Steeping parish. The main channel is supplemented by the Wainfleet Relief Channel as it passes Wainfleet All Saints, and the relief channel is joined by the old course of the Lymn. Once the two channels rejoin, there are three flood defence structures to protect the region from flooding by the North Sea. The river flows into the North Sea at Gibraltar Point.

== Route ==
The river rises on the southern slope of Belchford Hill, to the east of Belchford and close to the 300-foot (91 m) contour. It flows to the south and then to the east to reach Tetford, where there is a grade II listed water mill and mill house. It was built in the late eighteenth century, but shows evidence that it was built around an earlier structure. The much-repaired water wheel, dating from the seventeenth century, and the corn milling machinery are still intact. Beyond Tetford the river is joined by Double Dike, and flows south through woodland, passing to the west of Somersby and Bag Enderby. Here it is joined by a second stream, which rises on the eastern slope of Castcliffe Hill in Fulletby, close to the 280-foot (85 m) contour. It flows through a large lake and is joined by a stream from Holbeck Manor before passing through Salmonby. By the time the two streams join, they are below the 130-foot (40 m) contour.

It continues to the south-east and has dropped by another 33 feet (10 m) by the time it reaches the millpond of Stockwith Mill, beyond which is Stockwith Mill Bridge. The A158 road crosses at Aswardby Bridge, and the site of Aswardby Mill is below that. The next crossing is at Sausthorpe Bridge, which carries a minor road towards Sausthorpe, and the river drops below the 65-foot (20 m) contour at this point. The course continues to the east, passing under the A16 road between Spilsby and Partney at Partney Bridge, by Mill Farm, where there is a weir with a footbridge over the top. Beyond Spilsby, it turns to the south, crossing under a minor road at Northorpe Bridge and the B1195 road at Halton Bridge, to the east of Halton Holegate. Mill Bridge carries another minor road over the channel, but by the time the river reaches it, the river is in the Fens, the channel is embanked on both sides, and it crosses the 16-foot (5 m) contour.

=== Steeping River ===
The River Lymn is joined by another embanked channel, Lady Wath's Beck, as it passes between Great Steeping to the north and Little Steeping to the south, and takes the name Steeping River. The railway line between Boston and Skegness crosses to the north bank, and then follows the course of the river to below Wainfleet All Saints. The next bridge is Clough's Bridge, carrying a minor road over the main channel. Just before it, the old course of the Lymn leaves the straight channel of the Steeping River. It is no longer connected to the Steeping River, but is maintained as a drainage ditch by the Internal Drainage Board (IDB). Warth's Bridge and Thorpe Culvert Bridge follow, both roads leading to Thorpe Culvert railway station. Thorpe Culvert pumping station, owned by the IDB, is located just before the second bridge, and after it, the Wainfleet Relief Channel turns off, passing under the railway almost immediately. There are two more bridges as the main channel crosses Wainfleet Common, Bycroft's Bridge and Crow's Bridge. Crow's Bridge has an elliptical arch constructed of red bricks, and was designed by the engineer John Rennie in 1812. Salem Bridge carries the B1195 road to Wainfleet railway station, and the A52 road crosses to the east of Wainfleet All Saints. The channel is now also called Wainfleet Haven, and both names are used to describe it until it reaches the sea.

The Wainfleet Relief Channel is also crossed by the B1195 road, and shortly afterwards, the Lymn joins it. Cowcroft Drain, which joins the Lymn from the north, and the Lymn below the junction are both designated as main rivers, and are the responsibility of the Environment Agency, as is Croft Lane pumping station, which pumps the water from the Lymn into the relief channel. Croft Lane bridge is next, after which the A52 and the Boston to Skegness railway cross, and the relief channel rejoins Wainfleet Haven. The final section contains three flood defence structures. Haven House Sluice is first, after which the channel splits. Wainfleet Clough Outfall is on the western channel, which is tidal below the sluice. The Burgh Sluice Relief Channel is to the east, and Burgh Sluice protects it from the sea just before the two channels rejoin. Cow Bank Drain was excavated in 1812, as part of the last land reclamation scheme in the area. Cow Bank pumping station, owned by the IDB, pumps the drain into the outfall.

Below the outfall, Gibraltar Point National Nature Reserve is located to the east among the dunes and saltings. It is a Site of Special Scientific Interest (SSSI) and a Ramsar site, which provides a diverse habitat for birds such as grey plover and knot, plants including brackish water crowfoot and insects including the red-banded sand-wasp, among others. Gibraltar Point Sailing Club is located at Gibraltar Point, and the east bank of the river channel is used for mooring yachts. Now called Wainfleet Harbour, the channel crosses sand and mudflats to reach Wainfleet Swatch, an area of water protected from the North Sea by the Inner Knock sandbank at low water. The area to the south of Wainfleet Harbour is called Wainfleet Sand and is a danger area. It has been used for artillery practice since at least 1890, but may have been used for cannon and musketry practice long before that. More recently, it was part of RAF Wainfleet, and was used for weaponry practice by aircraft, until the closure of the range in December 2009.

== Hydrology ==
There is a layer of sandstone rock beneath the whole of the catchment of the River Lymn, which is largely covered by a layer of chalk. The sandstone outcrops in only a few places, and where it does, springs provide the base flow for the river. As the layers of rock continue to dip to the east, they are covered by boulder clay, gravel and alluvium.

Flow on the upper river is measured by a gauging station at Partney Mill, consisting of a Crump weir with a 16-foot (5 m) crest. The catchment area of the river above this point is 23.8 square miles (61.6 km^{2}), and this area received annual rainfall of 27.4 inches (696 mm) in the 1960s. This produces an average daily flow of 9.5 million gallons (43.2 Megalitres (Ml)), although a peak flow of 253M gallons (1149 Ml) was recorded in April 1981.

Discharge to the North Sea is along the Burgh Sluice Relief Channel during the winter and at times of high flow, but when flows in the river are low, Wainfleet Clough Sluice is used as the discharge point.

The Environment Agency measure water quality of the river systems in England. Each is given an overall ecological status, which may be one of five levels: high, good, moderate, poor and bad. There are several components that are used to determine this, including biological status, which looks at the quantity and varieties of invertebrates, angiosperms and fish. Chemical status, which compares the concentrations of various chemicals against known safe concentrations, is rated good or fail.

The water quality of the Lymn and Steeping was as follows in 2019.

Section	Ecological Status	Chemical Status	Length	Catchment	Channel
Lymn / Steeping	Moderate	Fail	28 miles (45 km)	65.75 square miles (170.3 km^{2})	heavily modified

Like most rivers in the UK, the chemical status changed from good to fail in 2019, due to the presence of polybrominated diphenyl ethers (PBDE) and mercury compounds, neither of which had previously been included in the assessment.

== History ==
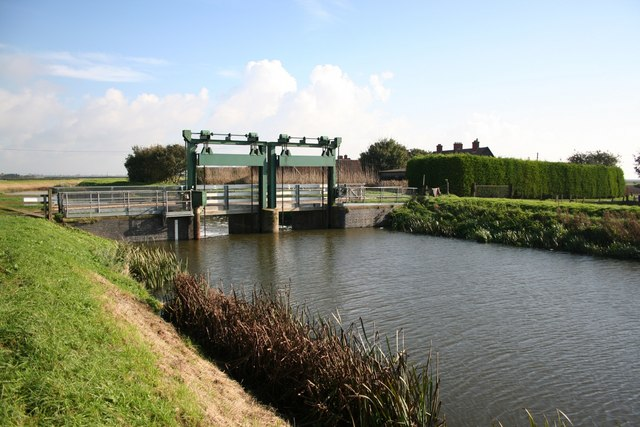
Haven House Sluice on the lower Wainfleet Haven or Steeping River

The manipulation of the river channel has a long history, dating back to at least the thirteenth century, when the river was diverted to the south at Firsby Clough and then to the east at White Cross Clough, creating two channels. Because the old channel ran through the manor of Croft, and was used to supply drinking water for cattle, an agreement for its management was reached in 1240. The flow was diverted along the old channel for the first three weeks after Easter, and then along the new channel for three weeks. This six-week cycle was repeated until Michaelmas (29 September). The arrangement was ratified by the Court of Sewers in 1432 and 1501, and continued in operation until at least 1774. The original channel is the Lymn, while the southern channel has been straightened and enlarged to become the Steeping River.

Thorpe Culvert takes its name from a culvert which was built under the river to drain water into the Bell Water Drain. The area to the north of the culvert became part of the Witham Fourth District in 1818, and the culvert was built soon afterwards. Responsibility for the drain passed to the Witham and Steeping Catchment Board following the passing of the Land Drainage Act in 1930, and they commissioned a new pumping station to pump water from the drain into the Steeping in 1938. It contained two Ruston & Hornsby diesel engines, driving 36-inch (91 cm) Gwynnes centrifugal pumps, and could pump 322M gallons (1,460 Ml) per day when both were running.

Responsibility for the drain and pumping station then passed to the Anglian Water Authority, and they built a new electric pumping station, which was commissioned in 1983. The diesel station was retained, but its condition deteriorated, so that by the early 1990s, only one of the engines was operational. At the request of Lindsey Marsh IDB, a small team of volunteers began to restore the station and the engines in 1994, and the site is opened for visitors three times a year. The restoration has enabled the station to be used twice in 2000 and once in 2004, when power failure prevented the electric station from operating, and during the floods of 2007, both engines ran to assist the electric pumps. The team of volunteers was led by Dennis Quincey, and following his death in 2002, the Drainage Board renamed it Quinceys Pumping Station.

In the medieval period, Wainfleet was an important port, and had a thriving salt industry, extracting salt from sea water. The town was much closer to the sea at that time, but the gradual silting of the channel and the enclosure of land on both sides of it saw the demise of the port, with its function taken over by Boston. The channel, known as Wainfleet Haven, was still used by shipping, although larger ships unloaded cargo into river barges close to Gibraltar Point, from where the barges travelled up the river to Wainfleet. Commercial use of the Haven by boats ceased in the 1920s.

== Points of interest ==
Point	Coordinates (Links to map resources)	OS Grid Ref	Notes
Belchford Hill	53.2634°N 0.0294°W	TF315758	source
Castcliffe Hill	53.2414°N 0.0389°W	TF309733	source
Stockwith Mill	53.2136°N 0.0314°E	TF357704	
A16 Partney Bridge	53.1863°N 0.0971°E	TF402675	
Junction with Lady Wath's Beck	53.1505°N 0.1426°E	TF433636	
Start of The Lymn	53.1310°N 0.1853°E	TF463615	old course
Start of Wainfleet Relief Channel	53.1197°N 0.1983°E	TF472603	
Jn of Lymn and Cowcroft Drain	53.1321°N 0.2267°E	TF490617	
Jn of Lymn and Wainfleet Relief Channel	53.1161°N 0.2410°E	TF500600	Croft Lane pumping station
End of Wainfleet Relief Channel	53.1112°N 0.2687°E	TF519595	
Wainfleet Clough outfall	53.1114°N 0.3035°E	TF542596	
Burgh Sluice	53.1022°N 0.3163°E	TF551586	
Wainfleet Harbour	53.0919°N 0.3191°E	TF553574	mouth

== Bibliography ==
- CAMS (January 2007). "The Steeping, Great Eau and Long Eau Catchment Abstraction Management Strategy (Part 2)" (PDF). Environment Agency. Archived from the original (PDF) on 28 March 2014.
- Hawley, David; Russell, Ian; Ray, John (May 2009). "Steeping River Catchment" (PDF). Lincolnshire County Council / Environment Agency. Archived (PDF) from the original on 4 March 2016.
- Manning, Chris; Quigley, Anita; et al. (June 2008). "The Lincolnshire Coastal Grazing Marshes Project - Water Level Management Study" (PDF). Lindsey Marsh Drainage Board. Archived (PDF) from the original on 15 June 2019.
- Marsh, Terry; Hannaford, Jamie (2008). UK Hydrometric Register (PDF). Natural Environment Research Council. ISBN 978-0-9557672-2-7. Archived from the original (PDF) on 31 October 2014.
- Owen, A E B (1965). A Thirteenth-century Agreement on Water for Livestock in the Lindsey Marsh (PDF). British Agricultural History Society. Archived (PDF) from the original on 4 March 2016.
- Robinson, David (2005). "Poachings - Croft Marsh" (PDF). Lincolnshire Life. Archived from the original (PDF) on 30 March 2012.
