= Swineshead, Lincolnshire =

Village and civil parish in Lincolnshire, England

Coordinates: 52.941292°N 0.156047°W

Swineshead
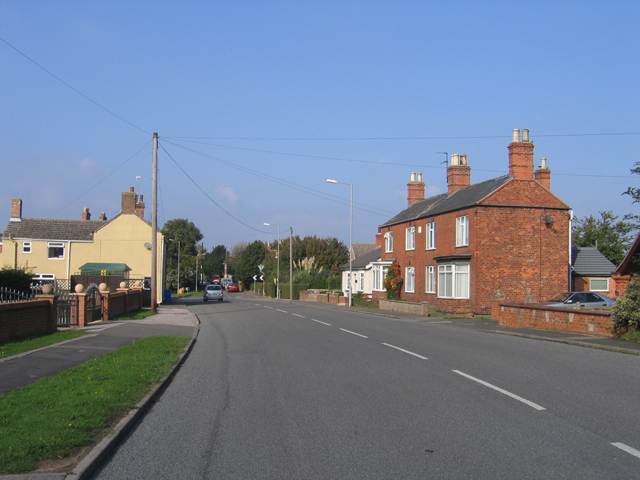
- High Street, Swineshead

- Location within Lincolnshire
- Population: 2,449 (2001)
- OS grid reference: TF240398
  - London: 100 mi (160 km) S
- District: Boston
- Shire county: Lincolnshire
- Region: East Midlands
- Country: England
- Sovereign state: United Kingdom
- Post town: Boston
- Postcode district: PE20
- Dialling code: 01205
- Police: Lincolnshire
- Fire: Lincolnshire
- Ambulance: East Midlands
- UK Parliament: Boston and Skegness

Swineshead is a village and civil parish in the Borough of Boston in Lincolnshire, England. It is 7 miles (11 km) west of the town of Boston. The population of the civil parish including Baythorpe was 2,810 at the 2011 census. The parish includes the areas of Swineshead Bridge and North End to the north, Fenhouses and Blackjack to the east, and Drayton to the south.

== History ==
The lost village of Stenning, or Estovening, mentioned in the Domesday Book of 1086 is represented by the site of the moated Estovening Hall, which was the manor house of the Holland family. Ralph, founder of the Estovening branch of the Holland family was buried in Swinehead Abbey in 1262.

A medieval motte castle is believed to have been constructed in the 12th century by the de Gresley family, lords of the manor of Swineshead at Manwar Ings. The remains of the castle are visible as substantial earthworks, which are a scheduled monument. The easiest access to the motte is by turning off the A52 which is in the Baythorpe region of the village.

Swineshead railway station opened in 1859 as part of the Boston, Sleaford and Midland Counties Railway, and survives today on the Poacher Line between Nottingham and Skegness.

Hitherto, the parish had formed part of Boston Rural District, in the Parts of Holland. Holland was one of the three divisions (formally known as parts) of the traditional county of Lincolnshire. Since the Local Government Act 1888, Holland had been in most respects, a county in itself.

== Governance ==
It is one of eighteen parishes which, together with Boston, form the Borough of Boston, which is in turn one of the seven districts of the non-metropolitan county of Lincolnshire. The local government has been arranged in this way since the reorganisation of 1 April 1974, which resulted from the Local Government Act 1972. This parish forms part of the Swineshead and Holland Fen electoral ward.

== Geography ==
Swineshead falls within the drainage area of the Black Sluice Internal Drainage Board. The A17 used to pass through the village but now passes to the west. The A52 passes close to the east.

== Community ==
The village has various shops, a post office, a pharmacy and a medical centre. Public houses include the Wheatsheaf, which is a Grade II listed building dating from the 18th century, and the Green Dragon. The village primary school is St Mary's Church of England Primary School.

Swineshead railway station is on the Nottingham-Skegness Line.

== Landmarks ==
Hardwick House is built on the site of a medieval moated house, possibly a grange, originally owned by Swineshead Abbey, and was listed in the crown bailiff's report when the abbey was dissolved in 1534.

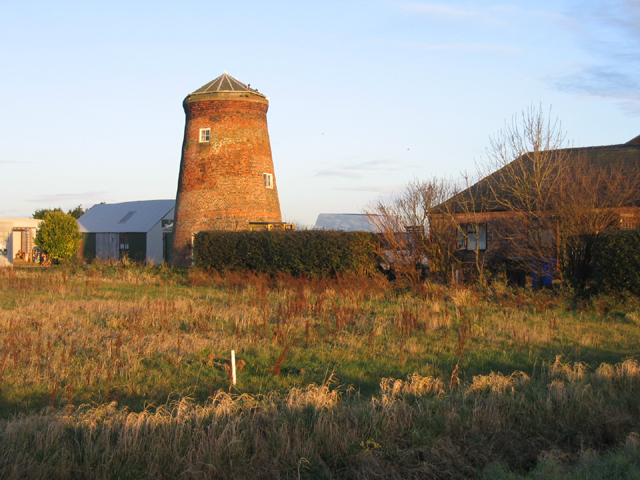
Swineshead, North End Mill

North End Mill is a 3-stage tower windmill built in 1821 which worked until the 1930s, when the sails blew off. It is Grade II listed.

The Wesleyan Methodists built a chapel in Swineshead in 1845, which was converted into a Sunday School after a new chapel was built in 1908. This was demolished in 1986 and the former chapel reverted to its original use, and is now a Grade II listed building.

=== St Mary's Church ===
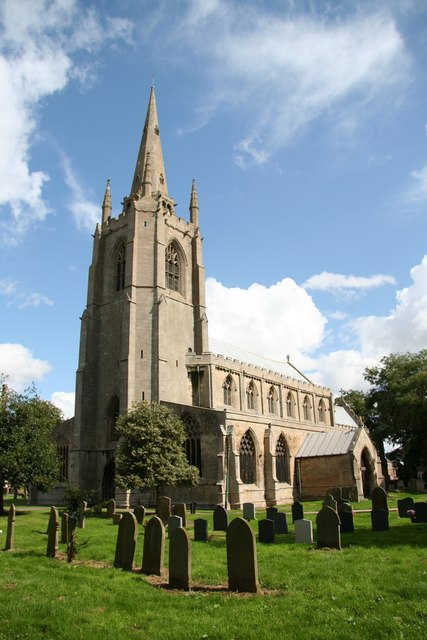
St Mary's church

The parish church is a Grade I listed building dedicated to Saint Mary, and dates from the 12th century with later additions and alterations. The chancel was rebuilt in 1848 by Stephen Lavin. The western tower and font are 14th-century. In the chancel is a black marble wall plaque to Sir John Lockton of Swineshead Abbey, who died in 1610.

=== Cistercian monastery ===
Swineshead Abbey was founded in 1135 as a Savigniac monastery, but in 1147 was converted to Cistercian by Robert de Gresley. In 1536 it was dissolved and the building of a private house and a park in 1607 destroyed the last traces of it. The site is a scheduled monument.

== Population ==
Population of Swineshead Civil Parish
Year	1801	1811	1821	1831	1841	1851	1881	1891	1901	1911	1921	1931	1941	1961
Population	1,555	1,561	1,696	1,994	2,079	2,044	1,622	1,616	1,752	1,899	1,895	1,990	1,945	1,824

== Notable people ==
- Fiona Dawson (born 1977), writer, filmmaker and activist, grew up in Swineshead
- Gilbert of Hoyland, abbot
- Herbert Ingram, founder of the Illustrated London News and MP for Boston, was born in Swinshead. He was instrumental in bringing the railways and fresh piped water to the village. His son became a lord, and the family were given the Ingram Baronetcy of Swineshead Abbey.
- Chris Woods, goalkeeper

== See also ==
- List of civil parishes in England

== Bibliography ==
- Quick, Michael (2023). Railway Passenger Stations in Great Britain: A Chronology (PDF) (5th ed.). London: Railway and Canal Historical Society.
