= Croft, Lincolnshire =

Village in Lincolnshire, England

Coordinates: 53.129600°N 0.254115°E

Croft
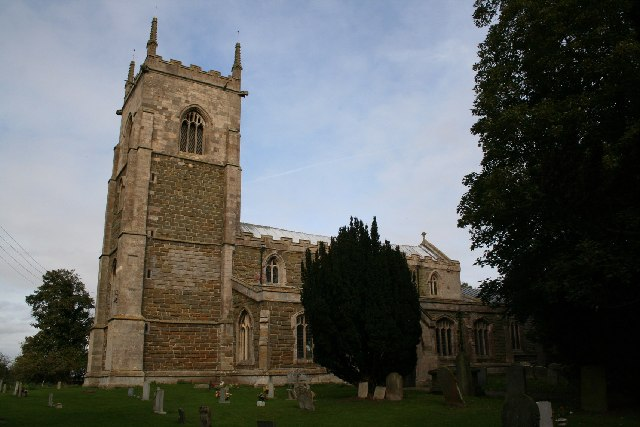
- Church of All Saints, Croft

- Location within Lincolnshire
- Population: 851 (2011)
- OS grid reference: TF509615
  - London: 110 mi (180 km) S
- District: East Lindsey
- Shire county: Lincolnshire
- Region: East Midlands
- Country: England
- Sovereign state: United Kingdom
- Post town: Skegness
- Postcode district: PE24
- Police: Lincolnshire
- Fire: Lincolnshire
- Ambulance: East Midlands
- UK Parliament: Boston and Skegness

Croft is a small village and civil parish in the East Lindsey district of Lincolnshire, England. The village is situated approximately 2 miles (3 km) north-east from Wainfleet, and 4 miles (6 km) south-west from Skegness.

Croft is listed in the 1086 Domesday Book with 15 households, 120 acres (0.5 km^{2}) of meadow and a salthouse.

The parish church is dedicated to All Saints and is a Grade I listed building built of greenstone, dating from the 14th century. Monuments inside the church include kneeling alabaster effigies to Sir Valentine Browne (d.1600) and Elizabeth (Monson) his wife, with their fifteen children in relief below. Its inscription states that Browne was "Treasurer and Vittleter of Barwicke and dyed (about 1600) Treasurer of Ireland". A related alabaster monument is to Valentine Browne's son John Browne (d.1614), and his wife Cicely (Kirkman). A further (ashlar) monument is to William Bonde (d.1559), erected by his son Nicholas, President of Magdalen College, Oxford. In the floor of the south aisle and chantry is a late 13th or early 14th century brass, the half effigy of a knight in banded mail. A tablet on the south side of the tower mentions a restoration of 1656; the church was again restored in 1857.

There is a tower windmill which is Grade II listed, built in 1814, which was raised in 1859 from four to seven storeys, and in 1949 reduced again to four. It comprises tarred red brick with brick battlements. No milling machinery survives inside.

The Old Chequers Inn is a Grade II listed public house dating from the 18th century.

Within the parish of Croft are two railway stations, one being the extant Havenhouse railway station, the other the now closed Seacroft railway station.

Other settlements within the parish, which is mainly rural and extends to the coast, include New England, just east of Wainfleet All Saints.

In 2011 REG Windpower announced plans to install a wind farm with six wind turbines on land at Bank House Farm near Croft. The plans are at consultation stage.

== Governance ==
An electoral ward in the same name exists. This ward stretches north west to Great Steeping with a total population taken at the 2011 Census of 2,288.
