= Swineshead railway station =

Railway station in village of Swineshead, Lincolnshire, England

Swineshead
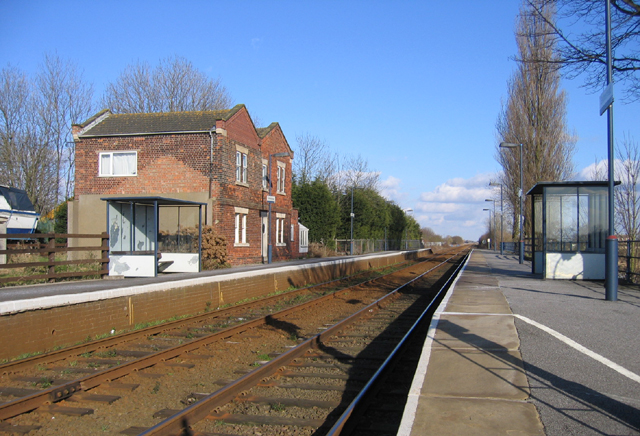

General information
- Location: Swineshead, Boston; England
- Coordinates: 52.96969°N 0.18725°W
- Grid reference: TF218429
- Manager: East Midlands Railway
- Platforms: 2

Other information
- Station code: SWE
- Classification: DfT category F2

History
- Opened: 1859

Passengers
- 2021/22: ▲1,300
- 2022/23: ▼1,226
- 2023/24: ▼894
- 2024/25: ▲1,232
- 2025/26: ▲1,340
Location
Notes
- Passenger statistics from the Office of Rail and Road

Swineshead railway station serves the village of Swineshead in Lincolnshire, England. Although named Swineshead, the station is, in reality, located in the hamlet of Swineshead Bridge some miles north of Swineshead. It is sited 130 miles 25 chains (209.7 km) from London Kings Cross (measured via Grantham), and is between Heckington and Hubberts Bridge, on the Poacher Line which runs between Nottingham and Skegness. The station is now owned by Network Rail and managed by East Midlands Railway who provide all rail services.

== History ==
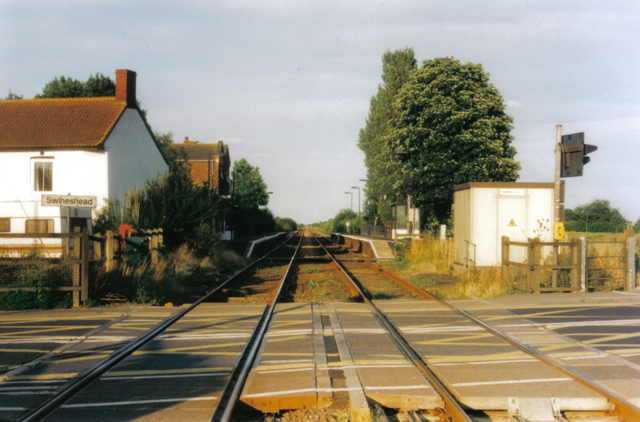
Railway line in August 2000

The line was opened by the Boston, Sleaford and Midland Counties Railway on 13 April 1859. The line through the station was doubled around 1881.

The station buildings remain in situ and are in private ownership.

== Facilities ==
The station is unstaffed and offers limited facilities other than two shelters, bicycle storage, timetables and modern 'Help Points'. The full range of tickets for travel are purchased from the guard on the train at no extra cost. Both platforms have step-free access. The westbound platform is accessed by a foot crossing.

In December 2020, Network Rail upgraded the level crossing, replacing the tarmac with concrete.

== Passenger volume ==
Passenger volume at Swineshead
	2004–05	2005–06	2006–07	2007–08	2008–09	2009–10	2010–11	2011–12	2012–13	2013–14	2014–15	2015–16	2016–17	2017–18	2018–19	2019–20	2020–21	2021–22	2022–23	2023–24	2024–25
Entries and exits	1,299	562	838	1,015	1,028	1,312	2,378	2,260	3,192	3,294	3,886	3,800	3,686	3,406	3,508	2,648	748	1,300	1,226	894	1,232

The statistics cover twelve month periods that start in April.

== Services ==
All services at Swineshead are operated by East Midlands Railway.

On weekdays and Saturdays, the station is served by a limited service of two trains per day in each direction, westbound to Nottingham via Grantham and eastbound to Skegness via Boston. There is no Sunday service at the station, although a normal service operates on most Bank Holidays.

Preceding station	National Rail	Following station
Heckington	East Midlands Railway: Poacher Line; Monday-Saturday only	Hubberts Bridge

== Community rail ==
The station, along with all others between Nottingham and Skegness, are part of the Poacher Line Community Rail Partnership.

== Bibliography ==
- Quick, Michael (2023). Railway Passenger Stations in Great Britain: A Chronology (PDF) (5th ed.). London: Railway and Canal Historical Society.
