= Havenhouse railway station =

Railway station in Lincolnshire, England

Havenhouse
- Havenhouse railway station in 1997

General information
- Location: Wainfleet, East Lindsey; England
- Coordinates: 53.11470°N 0.27314°E
- Grid reference: TF522599
- Manager: East Midlands Railway
- Platforms: 2

Other information
- Station code: HVN
- Classification: DfT category F2

History
- Original company: Wainfleet and Firsby Railway
- Pre-grouping: Great Northern Railway
- Post-grouping: London and North Eastern Railway

Passengers
- 2021/22: ▲380
- 2022/23: ▲1,200
- 2023/24: ▼698
- 2024/25: ▲902
- 2025/26: ▲982
Location
Notes
- Passenger statistics from the Office of Rail and Road

Havenhouse railway station is a remote railway station situated 3 miles (5 km) south-west of Skegness in Lincolnshire, England. The station is now owned by Network Rail and managed by East Midlands Railway who provide all rail services. It is 5 miles 78 chains (9.6 km) from the former Firsby North Junction, and 127 miles 78 chains (206.0 km) from London Kings Cross measured via Spalding, and is between Skegness and Wainfleet.

== History ==
The station, including the then-staffed signal box, seen in 1980. The small waiting shelter next to the signal box remains in use.

There is no settlement called Havenhouse, although one farm shares the name. The station was originally called 'Croft Bank' when was opened on 28 July 1873 by the Wainfleet and Firsby Railway but was renamed to Havenhouse in 1900.

The signal box has been closed and demolished, and part of the former station buildings are now a private residence. The waiting shelter on the Skegness-bound platform has no door or windows, and may among the smallest waiting rooms in Great Britain.

Up until the late 1960s, the station was the terminus of a three mile narrow-gauge railway bringing local produce to the station.

== Facilities ==
The station is unstaffed and offers limited facilities other than two waiting rooms, bicycle storage, timetables and modern 'Help Points'. The full range of tickets for travel are purchased from the guard on the train.

== Passenger volume ==
In 2018/19 it was the least used station in Lincolnshire and in the East Midlands and the fifth least used station in Great Britain. Due to its remote location and sparse service, it sees very few passengers, although is sometimes used by passengers for the Gibraltar Point nature reserve.

Passenger volume at Havenhouse
	2004–05	2005–06	2006–07	2007–08	2008–09	2009–10	2010–11	2011–12	2012–13	2013–14	2014–15	2015–16	2016–17	2017–18	2018–19	2019–20	2020–21	2021–22	2022–23	2023–24	2024–25
Entries and exits	80	985	884	316	328	378	100	132	226	278	166	162	106	172	158	84	162	380	1,200	698	902

The statistics cover twelve month periods that start in April.

== Services ==
All services at Havenhouse are operated by East Midlands Railway. On weekdays and Saturdays, the station is served by a limited service of two trains per day in each direction, westbound to Nottingham via Grantham, and eastbound to Skegness. There is no Sunday service at the station.

Preceding station	National Rail	Following station
Wainfleet	East Midlands Railway: Poacher Line; Monday-Saturday only	Skegness
	Disused railways	
Wainfleet	Great Northern Railway Firsby to Skegness railway branch line	Seacroft

== Community rail ==
The station, as with all others between Nottingham and Skegness, is promoted by the Poacher Line Community Rail Partnership.

== Bibliography ==
- Caton, Peter (2018). Remote Stations. Leicestershire: Matador. ISBN 978-1-78901-408-2.
- Quick, Michael (2023). Railway Passenger Stations in Great Britain: A Chronology (PDF) (5th ed.). London: Railway and Canal Historical Society.
