= Wainfleet =

Wainfleet may refer to the following places:

- Wainfleet, Ontario, Canada
- Wainfleet All Saints, Lincolnshire, England
  - Wainfleet railway station
- Wainfleet St Mary, Lincolnshire, England
