= Hubberts Bridge railway station =

Railway station in Lincolnshire, England

Hubberts Bridge
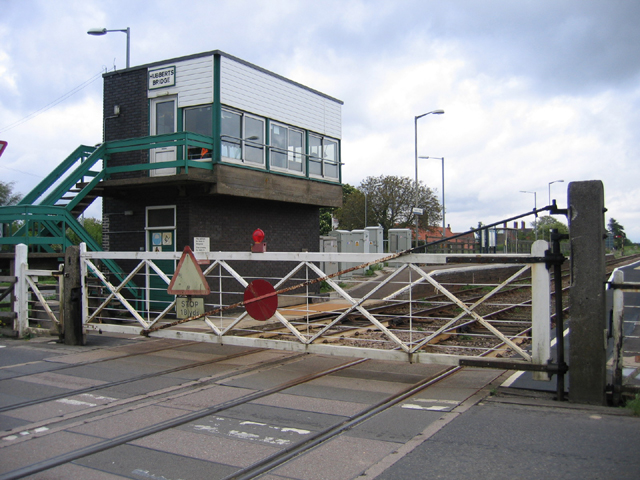

General information
- Location: Hubberts Bridge, Boston; England
- Coordinates: 52.97540°N 0.11010°W
- Grid reference: TF269436
- Manager: East Midlands Railway
- Platforms: 2

Other information
- Station code: HBB
- Classification: DfT category F2

Passengers
- 2021/22: ▲470
- 2022/23: ▲896
- 2023/24: ▼806
- 2024/25: ▼764
- 2025/26: ▲924
Location
Notes
- Passenger statistics from the Office of Rail and Road

Hubberts Bridge railway station serves the village of Hubberts Bridge in Lincolnshire, England. It is located on the Sleaford to Boston section of the Poacher line. Opened along with the line by the Boston, Sleaford and Midland Counties Railway in 1859, The eastbound platform is longer than the westbound platform: it can accommodate a three-car train, whereas the westbound platform can only accommodate a two-car train.

The station is now owned by Network Rail and managed by East Midlands Railway who provide all rail services.

A signal box at the West end of the station supervises a level crossing and the western end of the single track section from Boston. However, the station itself is unstaffed and offers limited facilities other than two shelters, bicycle storage, timetables and modern 'Help Points'. The full range of tickets for travel are purchased from the guard on the train at no extra cost, there are no retail facilities at this station.

== Services ==
All services at Hubberts Bridge are operated by East Midlands Railway.

On weekdays and Saturdays, the station is served by a limited service of three trains westbound to Nottingham via Grantham and two trains eastbound to Skegness via Boston.

There is no Sunday service at the station, although a normal service operates on most Bank Holidays.

Preceding station	National Rail	Following station
Swineshead	East Midlands Railway: Poacher Line; Monday-Saturday only	Boston
