= Thorpe Culvert railway station =

Railway station in Lincolnshire, England

Thorpe Culvert
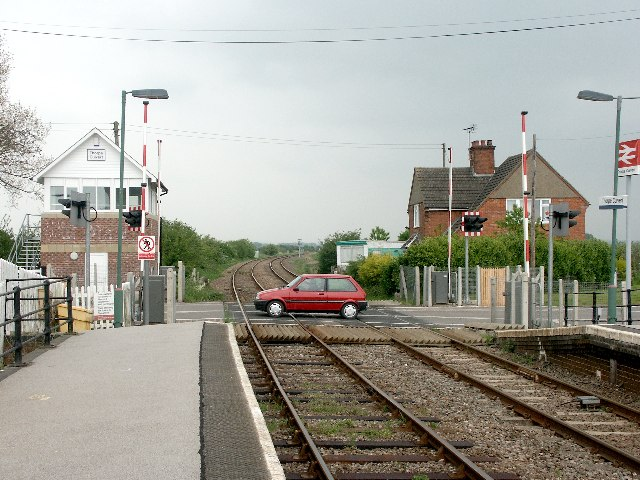

General information
- Location: Thorpe St Peter, East Lindsay, Lincolnshire; England
- Coordinates: 53.12303°N 0.19937°E
- Grid reference: TF472606
- Manager: East Midlands Railway
- Platforms: 2

Other information
- Station code: TPC
- Classification: DfT category F1

History
- Opened: 24 October 1871
- Original company: Wainfleet and Firsby Railway
- Pre-grouping: Great Northern Railway
- Post-grouping: London and North Eastern Railway

Passengers
- 2021/22: ▲580
- 2022/23: ▼396
- 2023/24: ▼364
- 2024/25: ▲788
- 2025/26: ▼532
Location
Notes
- Passenger statistics from the Office of Rail and Road

Thorpe Culvert railway station serves the village of Thorpe St Peter in Lincolnshire, England. It is situated 7 miles (11 km) from Skegness and 16.75 miles (27 km) from Boston.

The station is now owned by Network Rail and managed by East Midlands Railway who provide all rail services.

A signal box is present at the West end of the station to supervise a level crossing, however, the station itself is unstaffed and offers limited facilities other than two shelters, bicycle storage, timetables and modern 'Help Points'. The full range of tickets for travel are purchased from the guard on the train at no extra cost, there are no retail facilities at this station.

== History ==
The station was opened by the Wainfleet and Firsby Railway for passenger traffic on 24 October 1871 when the line opened between Firsby and Wainfleet. The passenger service was extended from Wainfleet to Skegness on 28 July 1873.

From 1896 the Wainfleet and Firsby Railway was taken over by the Great Northern Railway. Originally a single line the route was doubled by the GNR and this reached Thorpe Culvert on 9 July 1899.

== Services ==
All services at Thorpe Culvert are operated by East Midlands Railway.

On weekdays and Saturdays, the station is served by a limited service of two trains per day westbound to Nottingham via Grantham and three trains per day eastbound to Skegness.

There is no Sunday service at the station, although a normal service operates on most Bank Holidays.

Preceding station	National Rail	Following station
Boston	East Midlands Railway: Poacher Line; Monday-Saturday only	Wainfleet
	Disused railways	
Firsby	Great Northern Railway Firsby to Skegness railway branch line	Wainfleet
