= Heckington railway station =

Railway station in Lincolnshire

Heckington
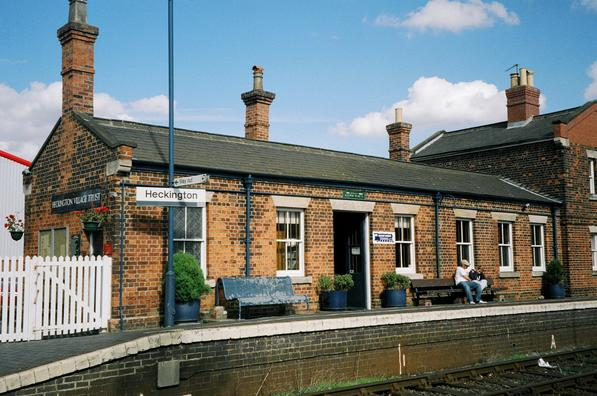
- The station building, which houses a museum

General information
- Location: Heckington, North Kesteven; England
- Coordinates: 52.97727°N 0.29402°W
- Grid reference: TF146435
- Manager: East Midlands Railway
- Platforms: 2

Other information
- Station code: HEC
- Classification: DfT category F2

History
- Original company: Boston, Sleaford and Midland Counties Railway
- Pre-grouping: Great Northern Railway
- Post-grouping: London and North Eastern Railway

Key dates
- 13 April 1859: Station opened

Passengers
- 2021/22: ▲37,834
- 2022/23: ▲38,408
- 2023/24: ▲39,340
- 2024/25: ▲40,268
- 2025/26: ▲48,466
Location
Notes
- Passenger statistics from the Office of Rail and Road

Heckington railway station is located in the village of Heckington in Lincolnshire, England. The old station building houses the Heckington Station Railway and Heritage Museum.

== History ==
The station was opened by the Boston, Sleaford and Midland Counties Railway on 13 April 1859. It is now owned by Network Rail and managed by East Midlands Railway who provide all rail services.

== Facilities ==
The station is unstaffed and offers limited facilities other than two shelters, bicycle storage, timetables and modern 'Help Points'. The full range of tickets for travel are purchased from the guard on the train at no extra cost, there are no retail facilities at this station.

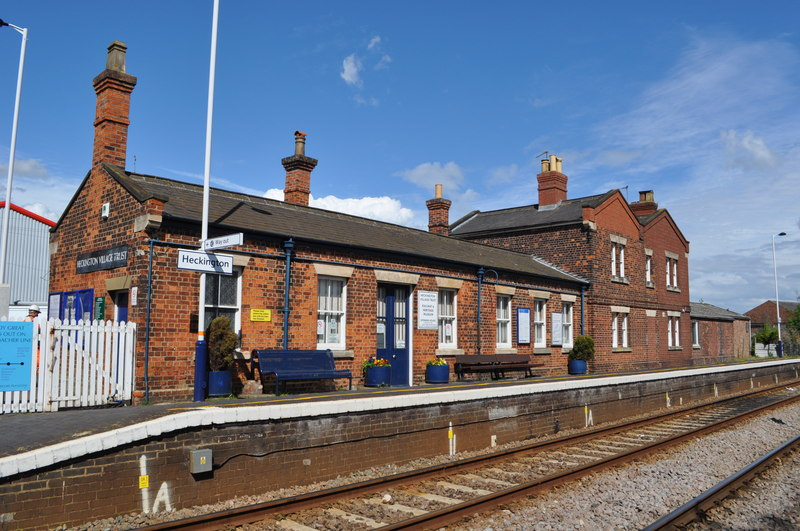
Station building and platforms

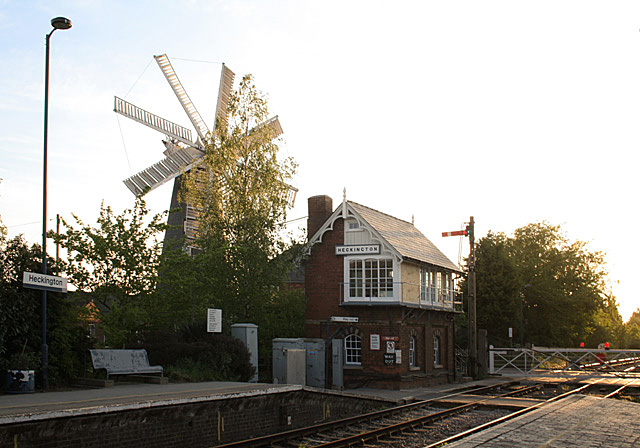
Signal box and Heckington Windmill

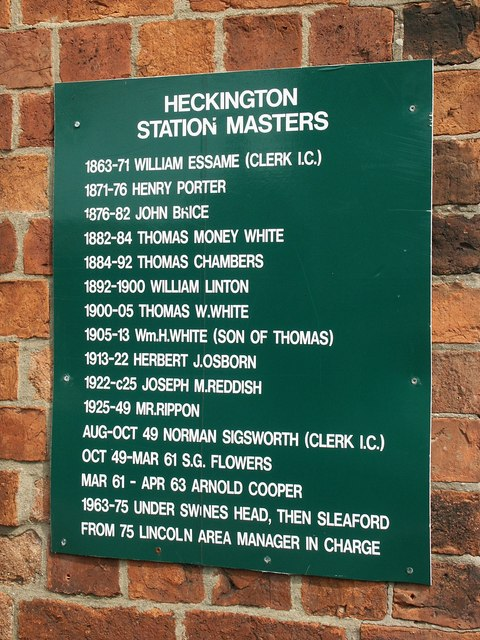
List of former Stationmasters

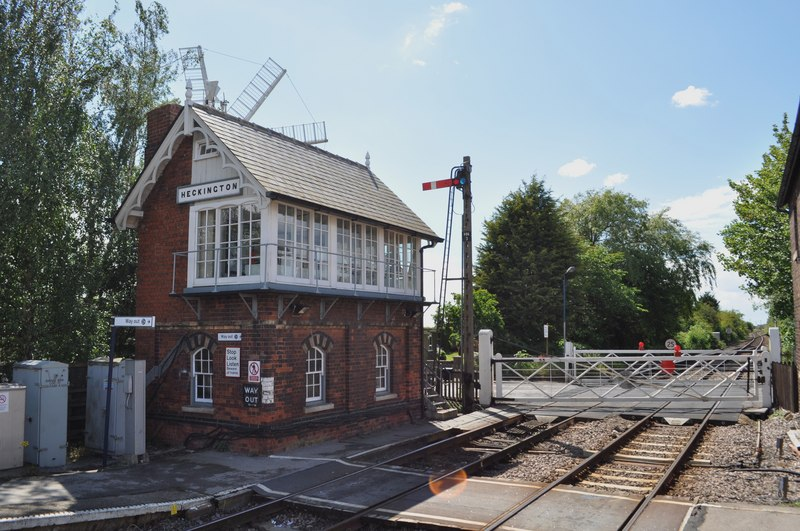
Signal, signal box & level crossing

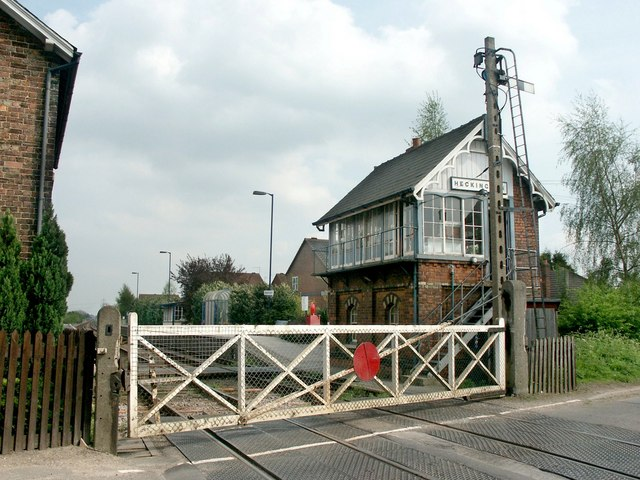
Same view, but in the direction of Boston

== Services ==
All services at Heckington are operated by East Midlands Railway.

On weekdays and Saturdays, The station is served by an hourly service westbound to Nottingham via Grantham and eastbound to Skegness via Boston.

On Sundays, the service is served by a limited service in each direction, with additional services during the summer months. Enhancements to the Sunday service are due to be made during the life of the East Midlands franchise.

Preceding station	National Rail	Following station
Sleaford	East Midlands Railway Poacher Line	Boston
Sleaford	East Midlands Railway Poacher Line	Swineshead Limited Service
