= Seacroft, Lincolnshire =

Linear settlement in the East Lindsey district of Lincolnshire, England

Coordinates: 53.10°N 0.54°E

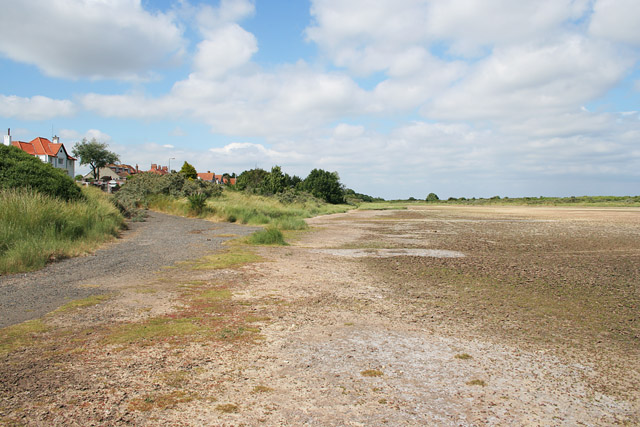
Houses on Seacroft Esplanade

Seacroft is a linear settlement in the East Lindsey district of Lincolnshire, England. It lies at the south of, and is conjoined to, Skegness, and comprises the less than half-mile long residential road, Seacroft Esplanade, and a golf course at its south. Farther south is Gibraltar Point nature reserve.

There was once a Seacroft railway station on the line between Boston and Skegness, just over 1 mile (1.6 km) to the west.
