= Firsby to Skegness railway branch line =

The Firsby to Skegness railway line is a branch railway line, in Lincolnshire, England. It was built by an independent company to connect Wainfleet, at first, and then the seaside town of Skegness, with the main line network at Firsby. It opened in 1871 from Firsby to Wainfleet, and 1873 throughout.

With the development of Skegness as a seaside holiday and excursion destination, the line increased in usage in the latter decades of the nineteenth century, and retained its popularity in most of the twentieth. In 1970 the main line at Firsby was closed north of the junction for Skegness, and the branch is now connected by the residual part of the main line from Boston. Although British seaside holidays have declined in popularity, Skegness as a resort, and the branch line remain in heavy use.

A publicity poster for Skegness as a holiday destination was published by the Great Northern Railway (GNR) in 1908, and caught the public imagination; it is still familiar today. Billy Butlin established his first holiday camp, Butlins, at Skegness in 1936, attracting much business to the line.

The branch line is open at the present day, although the connection to the former main line at Firsby faces towards Boston, by-passing the original junction.

== Origins ==
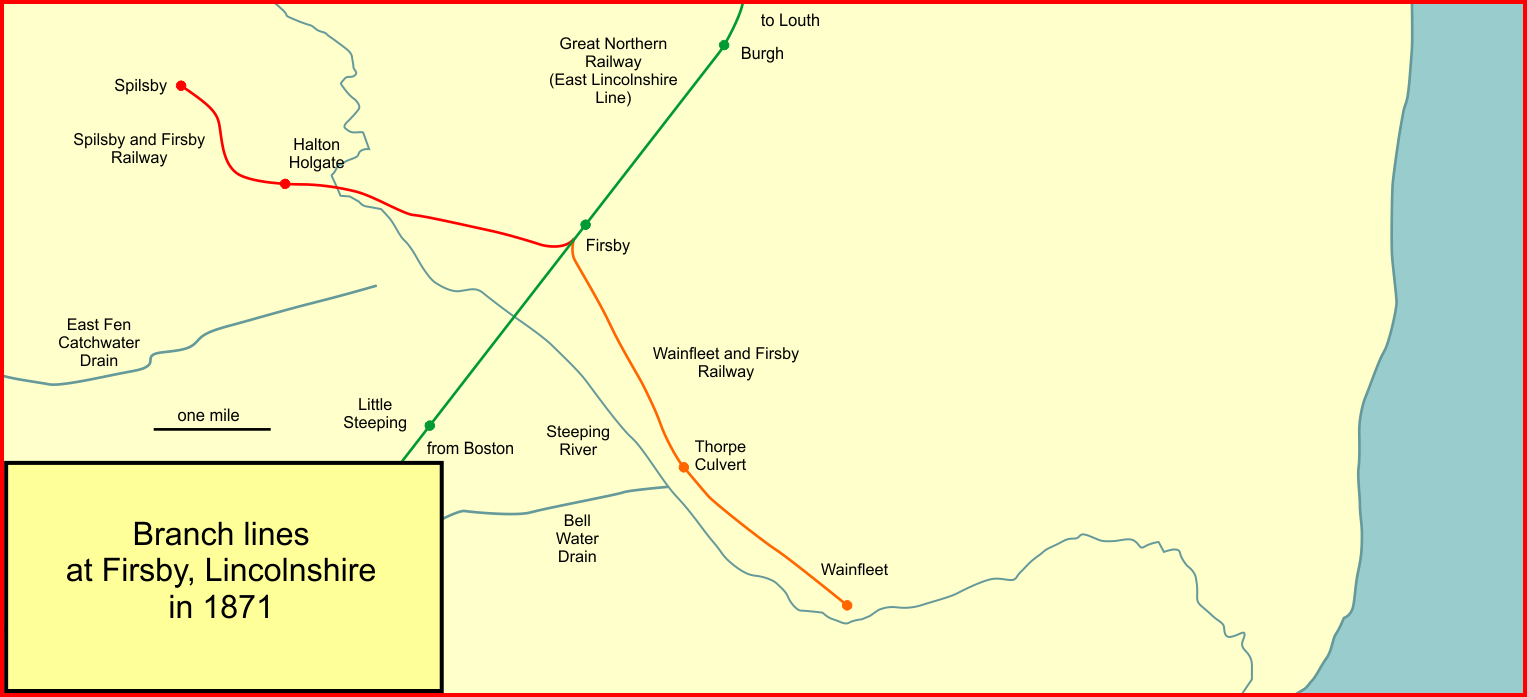
The Firsby to Wainfleet line in 1871

The East Lincolnshire Line had been opened by the Great Northern Railway in 1848; it ran from Boston to Grimsby by way of Firsby and Louth.

Wainfleet All Saints was an ancient river port, consisting of a quay alongside the Steeping River, known locally as Wainfleet Haven. Leleux says that it was a "decayed port and stagnating market town of 1,355 inhabitants" in 1871.

A public meeting held on 7 August 1868 agreed that a railway branch line from Firsby to Skegness was desirable. However, by the time of the deposition of plans in November, this had been limited to a line from Firsby to Wainfleet.

== Authorisation to Wainfleet, and opening ==
Wainfleet and Firsby Railway Act 1869
- Act of Parliament
- Parliament of the United Kingdom
- Long title: An Act for making a Railway from the East Lincolnshire line of the Great Northern Railway at Firsby to the town of Wainfleet All Saints, in the parts of Lindsey in the county of Lincoln; and for other purposes.
- Citation: 32 & 33 Vict. c. v

Dates
- Royal assent: 13 May 1869

Text of statute as originally enacted

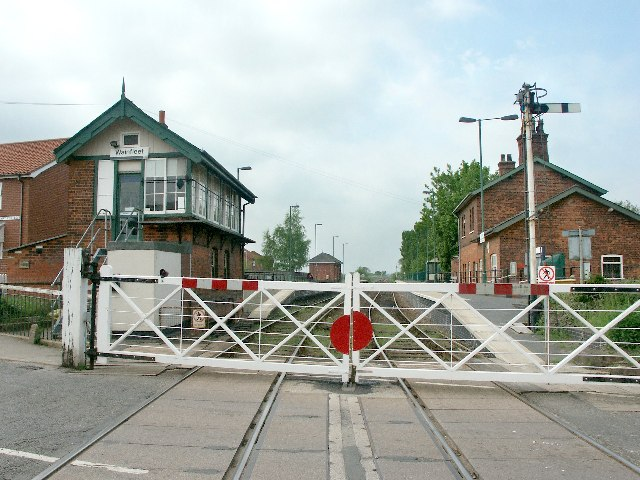
Wainfleet railway station

The Wainfleet and Firsby Railway (W&FR) was authorised by the Wainfleet and Firsby Railway Act 1869 (32 & 33 Vict. c. v); authorised share capital was £18,000, and the line was to be 4 miles 22 chains in length.

The railway hereinbefore referred to and authorized by this Act is,—

- A railway four miles two furlongs and four chains in length, wholly situate in the parts of Lindsey in the county of Lincoln, commencing in the parish of Firsby by a junction with the East Lincolnshire line of the Great Northern Railway, and terminating in the parish of Wainfleet All Saints.

— Section 5, Wainfleet and Firsby Railway Act 1869 (32 & 33 Vict. c. v)

As a small local branch line connected to the Great Northern Railway (at Firsby) the concern was likely to be dependent on the GNR. However the GNR had had bad experiences in the past in similar situations, and it declined to offer any financial help to the Wainfleet line, although it did carry ballast for it free of charge during the construction stages. The line was laid with 73 lb rails; there were five level crossings and no bridges.

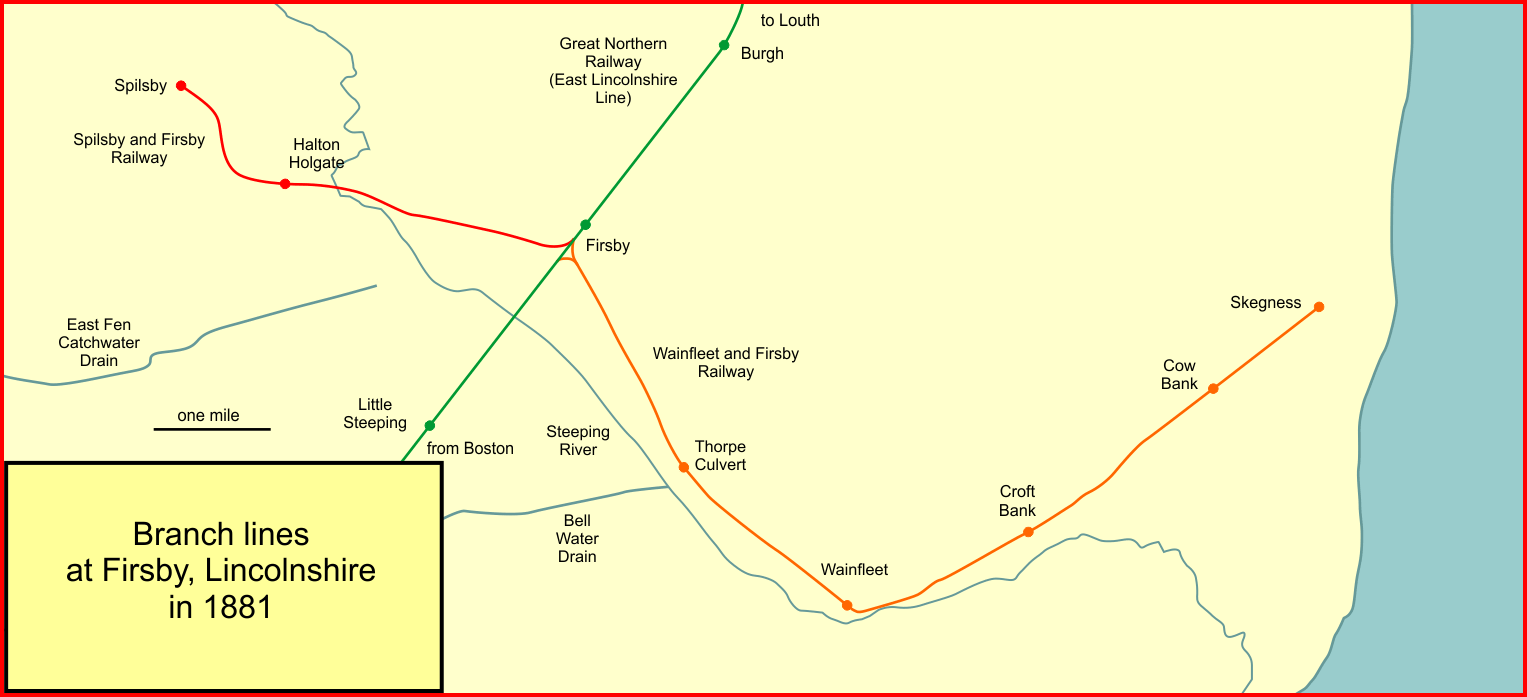
The Skegness branch in 1881

Goods traffic began on 11 September 1871; on 18 October Col Hutchinson of the Board of Trade visited the line and approved it for passenger train operation. Passenger trains started running on 24 October 1871. There were eight trains each way on weekdays only, and the single line was operated by train staff. Passengers for Skegness completed their journey from Wainfleet by horse-buses and wagons. Rent was charged to the Wainfleet and Firsby Railway Company for the use of the GNR station at Firsby at £50 per annum; at first the GNR worked the line for 60% of the receipts.

== On to Skegness ==
Wainfleet and Firsby Railway (Extension to Skegness) Act 1872
- Act of Parliament
- Parliament of the United Kingdom
- Long title: An Act for authorising the Wainfleet and Firsby Railway Company to extend their Railway from Wainfleet All Saints to Skegness; and to raise further moneys; and for other purposes.
- Citation: 35 & 36 Vict. c. lxxxix

Dates
- Royal assent: 18 July 1872

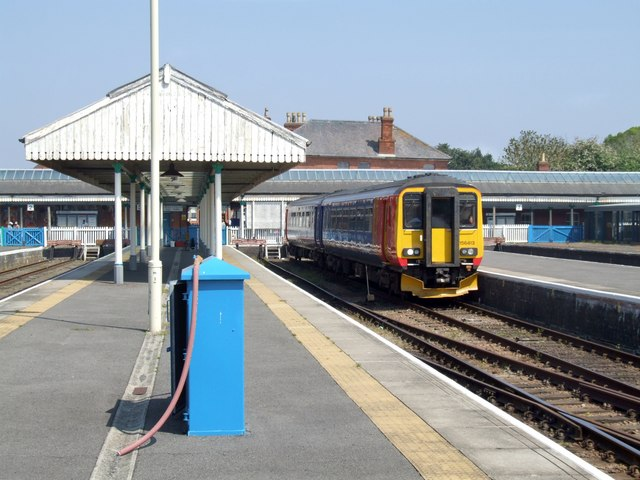
Skegness station

Skegness was rising in importance, and stopping short at Wainfleet was hardly logical, so the Wainfleet and Firsby Railway Company obtained the Wainfleet and Firsby Railway (Extension to Skegness) Act 1872 (35 & 36 Vict. c. lxxxix) on 18 July 1872 to extend its line to Skegness. The extension was constituted as a separate entity for shareholding purposes; £27,000 in new share capital was authorised by the act. The single line made an end-on junction at Wainfleet, and was 5 miles 2 chains in length. The train service was extended from Wainfleet to Skegness for general traffic on 28 July 1873. On summer Sundays one train was run each way. The GNR now worked the line for 50% of the receipts. A large sum was expended on constructing a commodious Skegness station.

== Heavy holiday traffic ==
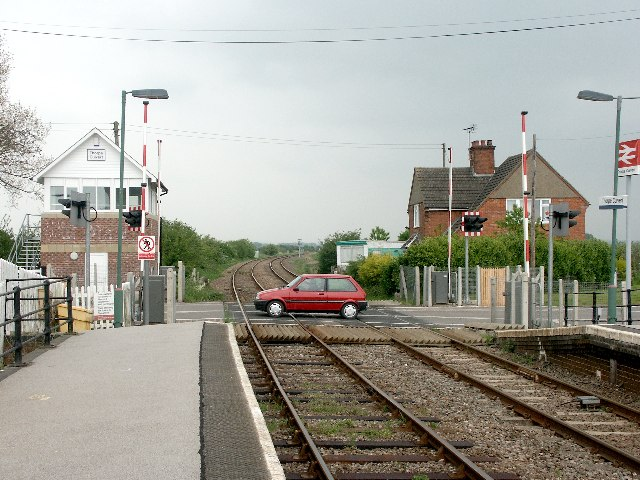
Thorpe Culvert railway station

Skegness proved a very popular seaside resort, and the branch generated a considerable revenue from excursion traffic. About 220,000 excursion passengers were brought to and from Skegness, from Nottingham, Yorkshire, and London in 1878. At the half-yearly shareholders' meeting later in 1878, the general nanager of the Great Northern Railway Company referred to an exceptionally busy day when many passengers were unable to get home promptly, saying, "We were overtaken by the traffic upon that day, and, though we got the people to Skegness all right, we could not get them away like clock-work. It is single line part of the way."

The junction for the branch at Firsby faced Grimsby, so all the excursion trains had to reverse there. A south curve, enabling through running to and from the south, had been authorised in 1874 but the work did not proceed at first. The scheme was revived in 1881, and the Board of Trade inspector approved it for passenger operation on 24 May 1881. Signal boxes for the new junctions were built at Firsby South and East. Construction of the curve was retrospectively authorised by an Act on 18 Jul 1881.

The junction with the East Coast Main Line at Barkston (then spelt Barkstone) faced south, and this too was inconvenient for any Skegness traffic coming from the north. A new north curve was opened on 29 March 1882, (authorised after the event by an Act on 19 August 1882). It was double track.

The GNR proposed doubling the line from Firsby to Skegness but the Wainfleet and Firsby Railway Company, still owner of the line, was not prepared to find the money, and suggested that the GNR could purchase the line. The W&FR was paying a handsome dividend of 7 3/4% at the time, and suggested that the GNR should pay £25 for every £10 share. This was more than the GNR was prepared to pay, so some limited improvements were carried out at W&FR expense. A 470-yard long passing place was installed at Wainfleet. The line was doubled for 1 1/2 miles from Cowbank to Skegness, and the terminus was re-signalled and the platforms extended.

== More infrastructure enhancements ==
The working agreement between the GNR and the W&FR was due to expire in August 1895. The GNR offered to buy the company at £15 per share, and in November after some negotiation, terms were agreed at £17 for each of the Wainfleet and Firsby Railway Company's £10 shares, of which there were 4,500. By the Great Northern Railway Act 1895 (58 & 59 Vict. c. xxxvi) of 30 May 1895, the GNR absorbed the smaller company as from 1 January 1896, (Note: Grant and Walker say 1 January 1896; Wrottesley says 1 July 1896. Carter says 31 December 1895.) at the price of £76,500.

Now that the line was its own, the GNR obtained powers on 25 July 1898 in the Great Northern Railway Act 1898 (61 & 62 Vict. c. clxv) to double the line. Doubling was in hand by May 1899; it reached Thorpe Culvert on 9 July, Wainfleet soon afterwards, and it was completed in June 1900 in time for the summer traffic. Skegness station was provided with another island platform.

WIDENING OF THE SKEGNESS BRANCH:—

- A widening of the Skegness branch of the Company on both sides thereof wholly in the parts of Lindsey in Lincolnshire commencing in the parish of Firsby in the rural district of Spilslby by a junction with the said Skegness branch at a point about thirty-six yards measured in a south-westerly direction along the said branch from the south-western end of the up platform at Firsby Station and terminating in the parish of Skegness in the urban district of Skegness at a point midway between the centre platform and the eastern platform at Skegness Station about twenty-one yards south-west of the south-western face of the station buildings.

— Section 5, Great Northern Railway Act 1898 (61 & 62 Vict. c. clxv)

== Train service ==
Nine trains each way ran between Firsby and Skegness in 1878, then six daily in 1889, and eleven in December 1938.

== Publicity ==
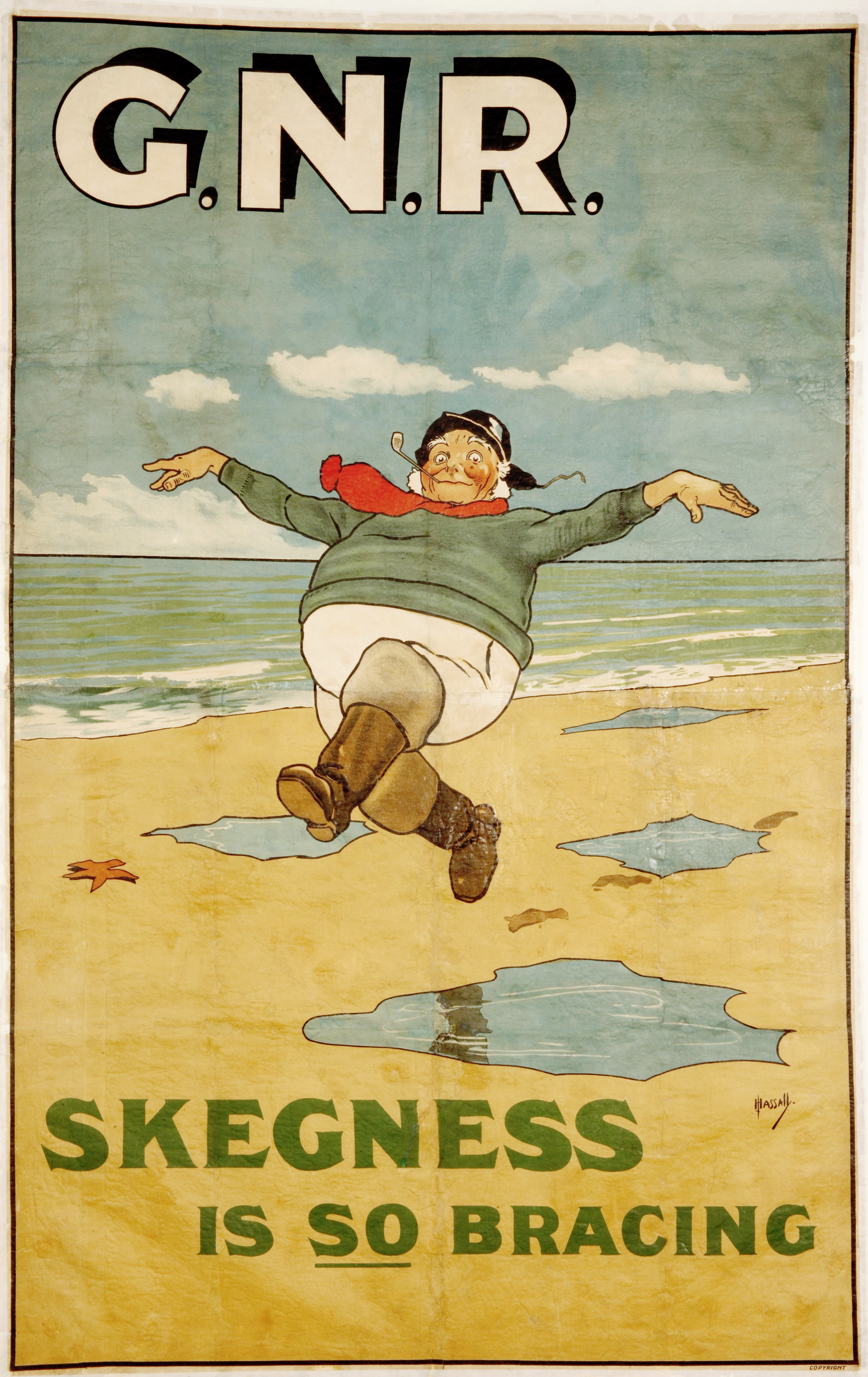
Poster: Skegness is So Bracing by John Hassall

In the early part of the twentieth century, the GNR ran cheap excursions to seaside towns. Skegness had been popular with Midlands excursionists, but had not attracted Londoners. In an attempt to change that, the GNR ran a series of day excursions in the summer of 1905, coupling them with heavy publicity. The trains often ran on Sunday, usually from King's Cross. They were a considerable success, and on August Bank Holiday 1905, six trains were required. The GNR further encouraged the business, and in 1908 the GNR published, The Jolly Fisherman, a poster of a burly fisherman capering along the sands, proclaiming 'Skegness is so bracing'. The image caught the public imagination, and caused a sensation.

The GNR purchased the painting from the artist, John Hassall for £12; the transaction took place on 13 February 1908. The GNR added to the painting the words "Skegness is so bracing" and it was first used to advertise a trip from London King's Cross to Skegness on Good Friday 17 April 1908. The trip cost 3/-, and the train left King's Cross at 11.30 am. Even today "the Jolly Fisherman" is still proudly used by the resort in its advertising and the original painting hangs in the Town Hall at Skegness. (Note: Walker wrote this in 1987.) Later there was a painting of a scene from Charley's Aunt (from the well-known play), on the sands at Skegness, announcing that excursions were "still running".

== Better train services ==
Skegness Council approached the GNR in November 1910 to ask for a better holiday train service Manchester, Birmingham, and Leeds, suggesting a new line to shorten the distance. The GNR suggested an alternative new line, which became the Kirkstead and Little Steeping Railway, and promised improved services. In the summer, the Leeds train came five days a week (including Sundays) there were Manchester through carriages (attached to the Yarmouth train between Retford and Sleaford) and Lincoln trains reversing at Boston.

The new line consisted of 15 miles of double track; it opened for passenger and goods traffic on 1 August 1913. In summer, through carriages from Manchester and Sheffield, and the Leeds train diverted to the new route.

== Butlins Holiday Camp ==
In 1936 Butlin's Holiday Camp was opened at Skegness. It became a good revenue earner for the railway and Saturdays were particularly busy at Skegness Station. Road transport was laid on from Skegness station to and from the camp. During World War II the camp was taken over by the Royal Navy and renamed HMS Royal Arthur. It was used to train new recruits.

== 1950s ==
Up to forty holiday trains arrived from Leicester, Nottingham, Derby, Birmingham and London on summer Saturdays in 1955, so the 24 carriage sidings were well used.

== Diesels ==
Diesel traction was introduced into Lincolnshire in 1955 and by 1959 the whole branch passenger services were taken over by the DMU's.

== Paytrains ==
The paytrain (conductor-guard) system was introduced on the branch from 7 October 1968. Station ticket offices were closed and passengers obtained tickets on the trains.

== East Lincolnshire Line closed ==
On 5 October 1970 the East Lincolnshire Line was closed between Grimsby and Firsby, inclusive.

== Restricted hours ==
To limit expenditure on signallers' and crossing keepers' wages, Skegness train operation was restricted to a single ten-hour shift from October 1977; buses provided early morning and late evening connections with Boston. However, British Rail and Lincolnshire County Council embarked on a jointly funded venture to provide automatic barriers at level crossings. The full timetable was restored during 1989 and in 1992 there were 16 trains each way on the branch.

== Current train service ==
The Skegness branch continues in passenger use at the present (2019) with an approximately hourly service to and from Nottingham.

== Station list ==
- Firsby; opened 3 September 1848; closed 5 October 1970;
- Thorpe Culvert; opened 24 October 1871; still open;
- Wainfleet; opened 24 October 1871; still open;
- Croft Bank; opened 28 July 1873; renamed Havenhouse 1900; still open;
- Cow Bank; opened 28 July 1873; renamed Seacroft 1900; closed 7 December 1953;
- Skegness; opened 28 July 1873; still open.

== See also ==
Lincolnshire lines of the Great Northern Railway
