= Thorpe St Peter =

Village and civil parish in the East Lindsey district of Lincolnshire, England

Coordinates: 53.122815°N 0.216230°E

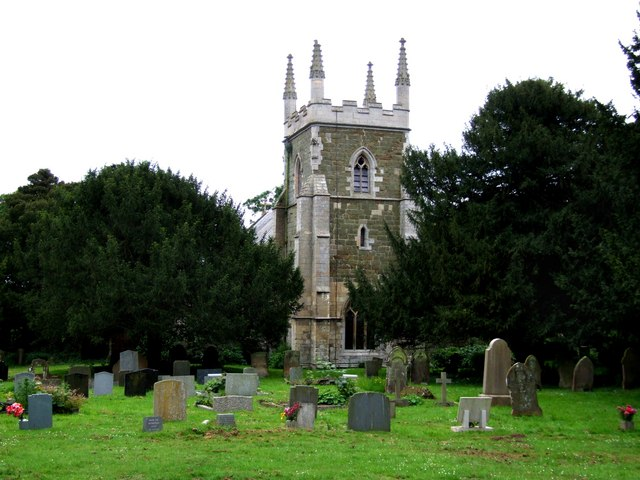
- St Peter's Church, Thorpe St Peter

- Location within Lincolnshire
- Population: 320 (2011)
- OS grid reference: TF484606
  - London: 115 mi (185 km) S
- District: East Lindsey
- Shire county: Lincolnshire
- Region: East Midlands
- Country: England
- Sovereign state: United Kingdom
- Post town: Skegness
- Postcode district: PE24
- Police: Lincolnshire
- Fire: Lincolnshire
- Ambulance: East Midlands
- UK Parliament: Boston and Skegness

Thorpe St Peter is a village and civil parish in the East Lindsey district of Lincolnshire, England, about 1 mile (1.6 km) north-west from the town of Wainfleet.

Thorpe is listed in the Domesday Book of 1086 as having 33 households, two mills and a church.

The parish church, dedicated to Saint Peter is a Grade I listed building dating from 1200 with later additions and alterations, and restored in the 19th century. It is built of greenstone and limestone. The west tower dates from the mid-14th century, and there is an early 13th-century font.

Thorpe Culvert railway station was opened here in 1873.

The Quincey pumping station on Culvert Road dates from 1938, and is operated by the Lindsey Marsh Drainage Board.

== Sport ==
Thorpe St Peter is home to the Wainfleet & District Sporting Motorcycle Club. It hosts Motorcycle Grasstrack Racings International Lincolnshire Poacher and in 2011 held the European Grasstrack Championship Final.
