= Friskney Eaudyke =

Settlement in Lincolnshire, England

Coordinates: 53.080073°N 0.19889653°E

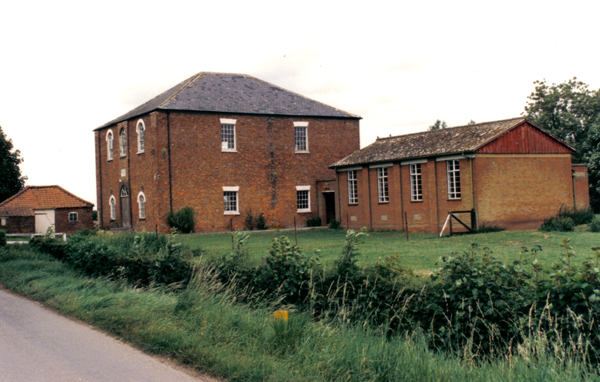
- Wesleyan Centenary Chapel, Friskney Eaudyke

- Location within Lincolnshire
- Population: 1,563
- OS grid reference: TF473559
  - London: 105 mi (169 km) S
- Civil parish: Friskney
- District: East Lindsey
- Shire county: Lincolnshire
- Region: East Midlands
- Country: England
- Sovereign state: United Kingdom
- Post town: BOSTON
- Postcode district: PE22
- Dialling code: 01754
- Police: Lincolnshire
- Fire: Lincolnshire
- Ambulance: East Midlands

Friskney Eaudyke is a settlement in the civil parish of Friskney, and the East Lindsey district of Lincolnshire, England. It is 11 miles (20 km) north-east from Boston and 30 miles (50 km) east-southeast from the city and county town of Lincoln.

Friskney Eaudyke is 1 mile (1.6 km) east from the parish village of Friskney, and the same distance north-east from the parish hamlet of Fold Hill. The A52 road, which runs locally from Boston to Skegness, is 800 yards (700 m) south-east.

The settlement is centred on the northwest-to-southeast Eau Dyke Road, between Low Road at the north-west and the staggered junction with Sickling Lane and Chapel Lane at the south-east. Friskney Eaudyke comprises detached and semidetached houses, farms with associated buildings, a farm produce distribution company, a balloon supply & event company, a garage services company, and Grade II listed buildings.

The listed Bridge Farmhouse, a late 18th-century two-storey red brick house, is on Low Road south from the junction with Eau Dyke Road. Over the junction and further north on Low Road is Ash Tree Farmhouse, a mid-18th to mid-19th-century gabled red brick house. At the north on Mill Lane off Low Road, and near the border with Wainfleet St Mary, is Hoyle's Windmill, of three-storeys and today converted to a storehouse by the addition of an attached building. Largely early 19th-century, it dates from 1730. At the south-west on Chapel Lane is the Grade II* listed 19th-century red brick Wesleyan Centenary Chapel, dating to 1839.

In 1871 "Ancient British" pottery, and fragments of bone were found by workmen on Eaudyke Road at the south-east of the settlement. Kelly's Directory in 1885 noted the 1871 archeological finds by workmen as they were building the infants' school at 'Eaudyke'. The directory records a schoolmistress, and the Wesleyan chapel which it said was built in 1832. The listed trades at 'Eaudyke' in the 1933 Kelly's Directory included five farmers, a potato merchant, a saddler, a beer retailer, a shopkeeper, a grocer, a butcher, a baker, and a motor engineer.
