= Seacroft railway station =

Former railway station in Lincolnshire, England

Coordinates: 53.1327°N 0.3115°E

Seacroft
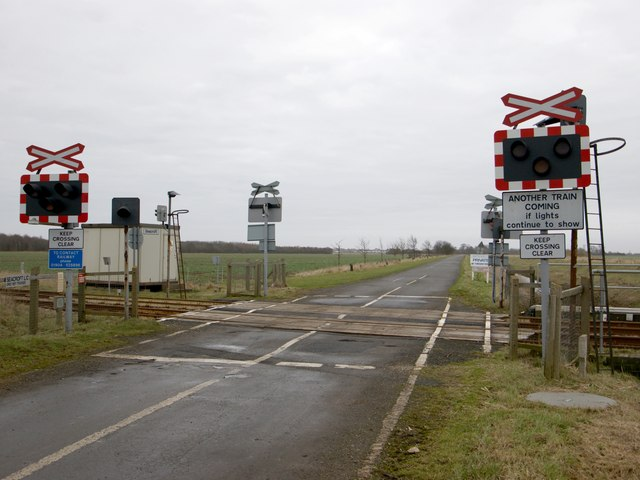
- The site of the station is at the left of the level crossing

General information
- Location: Seacroft, East Lindsey, Lincolnshire; England
- Grid reference: TF547620
- Platforms: 2

Other information
- Status: Disused

History
- Original company: Wainfleet and Firsby Railway
- Pre-grouping: GNR
- Post-grouping: LNER; Eastern Region of British Railways

Key dates
- 1873: Opened as Cow Bank
- 1900: Renamed Seacroft
- 1953: Closed to passengers
- 1964: Closed to goods
Location

Seacroft railway station was a station in Seacroft, Lincolnshire.

The station was opened on 28 July 1873 and originally called Cow Bank, but was renamed to Seacroft on 1 October 1900. Passenger services were withdrawn on 7 December 1953 due to lack of use, and the station was closed to goods on 27 April 1964. The line it was on, between Boston and Skegness remains open.

Former Services

Preceding station	Disused railways	Following station
Havenhouse	Great Northern Railway; Firsby to Skegness railway branch line	Skegness

== See also ==
Firsby to Skegness railway branch line
