= Friskney =

Village and civil parish within the East Lindsey district of Lincolnshire, England

Coordinates: 53.077422°N 0.179491°E

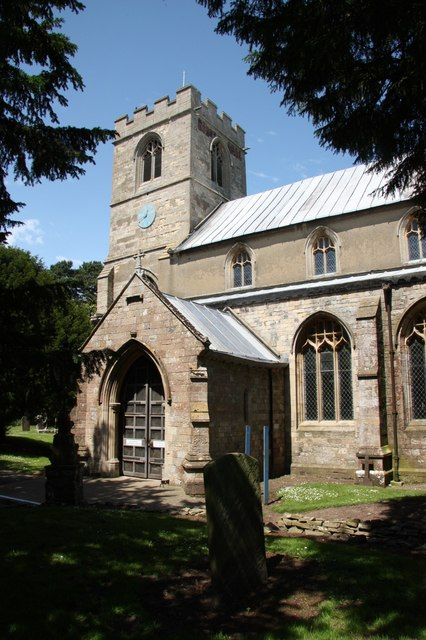
- Church of All Saints, Friskney

- Location within Lincolnshire
- Population: 1,563 (2011 Census)
- OS grid reference: TF460555
  - London: 105 mi (169 km) S
- Civil parish: Friskney
- District: East Lindsey
- Shire county: Lincolnshire
- Region: East Midlands
- Country: England
- Sovereign state: United Kingdom
- Post town: BOSTON
- Postcode district: PE22
- Dialling code: 01754
- Police: Lincolnshire
- Fire: Lincolnshire
- Ambulance: East Midlands

Friskney is a village and civil parish within the East Lindsey district of Lincolnshire, England.

The parish includes the settlement of Friskney Eaudyke. The 2011 Census recorded a parish population of 1,563. in 652 households.

== History ==
The place-name 'Friskney' is first attested in the Domesday Book of 1086, where it appears as Frischenei. It is recorded as Freschena circa 1115 and as Freschenei circa 1150. The name is Viking, meaning 'freshwater island' (Old English Frescan ēa).

In 1885 Kelly's reported two Wesleyan chapels, one built in 1804. The chapel built in 1839 is Grade II* listed. It recorded that Friskney parish was a centre for brick making and the catching of shrimps and cockles. In the early part of the 19th century, much of the land was wetlands or swamp, where wildfowl were caught by use of decoy ponds. One of these ponds is now a listed ancient monument. The swamp was drained in the early 19th century and the land converted for arable cultivation.

== Governance ==
Friskney is part of the electoral ward called Wainfleet and Friskney. The population of this ward at the 2011 Census was 4,192.

== Geography ==
Friskney is situated 11 miles (18 km) north-east from the town of Boston, and 8 miles (13 km) south-west from the coastal town of Skegness. The nearest railway station is at Wainfleet All Saints, 3 miles (5 km) to the north-east. The nearest major roadway is the A52 which runs 1 mile (1.6 km) from the eastern side of the village. Friskney, with its surrounding farmland, is the largest village by area in the UK, and one of the largest in Europe.

== Community ==
The Grade I listed Anglican church is dedicated to All Saints. The original church was constructed in the late 12th century; it had elements added up to the 15th. Restoration to the chancel was carried out in 1849.

During an extensive restoration in 1879, Norman and Early English Gothic architectural fragments were discovered. The lower stage of the tower, with large lancet windows, is Early English, as is the second stage. The two upper stages are 15th-century, as is the font. In the north aisle is an incised stone slab to John de Lyndewode (rector, 1374) and a mutilated effigy of a 14th-century knight, most likely damaged during the iconoclasm of the Protestant Reformation. During the 1879 restoration, a series of faded wall paintings were revealed between the arches of the arcades.

Abbey Hills, the site of an old religious house connected with Bolington [Bullington] Priory or Bardney Abbey, lies half a mile west from the church.

On the western side of the village on Dickon Hill Road is the Parrot Zoo and National Parrot Sanctuary. The Sanctuary was opened in 2003. The sanctuary was renamed as Lincolnshire Wildlife Park in 2016 due to the expansion of the site, and contains both the National Parrot and Turtle sanctuary within amongst other rescued animals.

The village has a church hall, two public houses, The Anchor and The Barley Mow, and a village shop with post office. There are sports clubs for archery, bowls and cricket, and a football team. The cricket club first XI competes in the South Lincolnshire and Border League.
