= Workman =

Workman may refer to:

- Workman (horse)
- Workman (surname), an English surname
- Workman keyboard layout, an alternative English keyboard layout for ergonomic usage
- Workman Publishing Company, an American publisher
- Workman Township, Minnesota, United States

== See also ==
- Worker (disambiguation)
