= Gibraltar Point, Lincolnshire =

Headland and nature reserve on Lincolnshire coast, England

Gibraltar Point
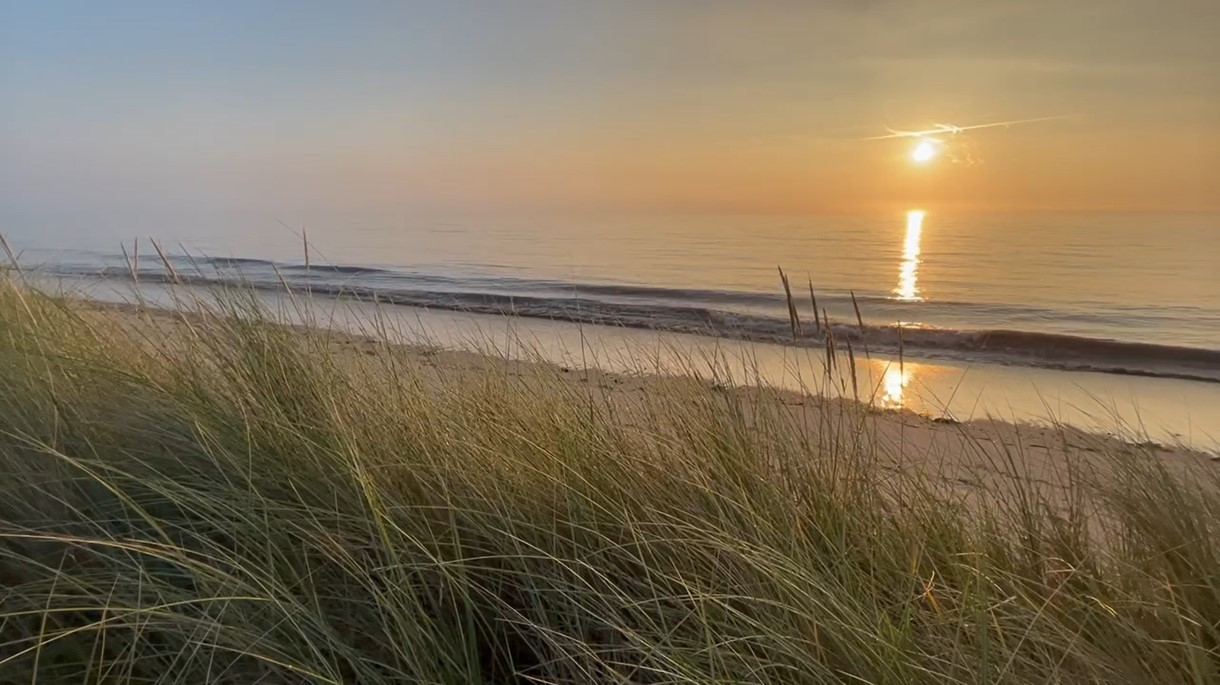
- Gibraltar Point beach at sunrise

- Location within Lincolnshire
- OS grid: TF560580
- Coordinates: 53.09641°N 0.32838°E
- Area: 437 hectares (1,080 acres)
- Manager: Lincolnshire Wildlife Trust

Ramsar Wetland
- Designated: 5 March 1993
- Reference no.: 589

Gibraltar Point is a headland on the coast of Lincolnshire, England, 3.5 miles (5.6 km) south of Skegness, where the North Sea coast turns southwest towards Boston and enters The Wash. The point is at the southernmost point of a national nature reserve covering an area of about 4.3 km^{2} (1.7 sq mi) .

The reserve is owned by Lincolnshire County Council and East Lindsey District Council and is administered by the Lincolnshire Wildlife Trust. The reserve comprises two parallel ridges of sand dunes—the "east dunes" and the "west dunes"—separated by about half a kilometre (550 yards) of salt marsh; and an area on the seaward side with further salt marsh and sand, shingle and muddy beaches. The reserve extends for a distance of about 5 km (3 mi) along the coast, from the southern end of Skegness to the northern corner of The Wash . A golf course occupies much of the west dunes (the inland side) at the Skegness end of the area. Gibraltar Point is an area of coastal deposition—at the end of the 18th century the west dunes were by the shore, but they are now a kilometre inland.

In 2016 a new visitor centre opened at the southern end of the reserve to replace the previous one which had been damaged by Cyclone Xaver. There are numerous paths around the area, and several artificial lakes and hides. The Lincolnshire Wildlife Trust also owns an old farm and land just inshore of the west dunes at the southern end of the reserve, again with an artificial lake and hides. Revenue from car parks assists in the upkeep of the area.

Gibraltar Point is part of the twice daily inshore waters forecast in the extended form of the Shipping Forecast broadcast on BBC Radio 4.

The reserve's importance is recognised by its various designations:

- SSSI (Site of Special Scientific Interest)
- NNR (national nature reserve)
- Ramsar wetland site (wetland of international importance)
- SPA (Special Protection Area).

== Access ==
Gibraltar Point is reached by a road from Skegness which dead-ends at the visitor centre. It can also be reached from Skegness by the King Charles III England Coast Path, but the coast path south is at present closed as far as Friskney Eaudyke because there is no safe crossing of the Steeping River immediately west of the nature reserve.

== Flora and fauna ==
=== Birds ===
The reserve is home to a great variety of birdlife, mostly wildfowl, waders and gulls. The geography of the area, at the northern mouth of The Wash, makes the reserve very popular with migrant birds and many nationally rare species have been recorded. A total of 325 bird species have been recorded at the site as of 2021, the highest such total for any site in Lincolnshire. Recently, these have included black stork, pallid harrier, caspian tern, red-flanked bluetail and rustic bunting during 2015, and broad-billed sandpiper, black-winged pratincole and great reed warbler in 2014.

Notable breeding birds at the site include little tern, common shelduck, ringed plover, oystercatcher and common redshank, whilst the site is of international significance for overwintering wader species such as oystercatcher, grey plover, red knot, sanderling and bar-tailed godwit. Nationally important numbers of ringed plover also overwinter.

The site is home to a bird observatory, which has studied bird migration in the area since April 1949.

=== Flora ===
Gibraltar Point has the northernmost colony of sea heath in Britain.
