= Wainfleet railway station =

Railway station in Lincolnshire, England

Wainfleet
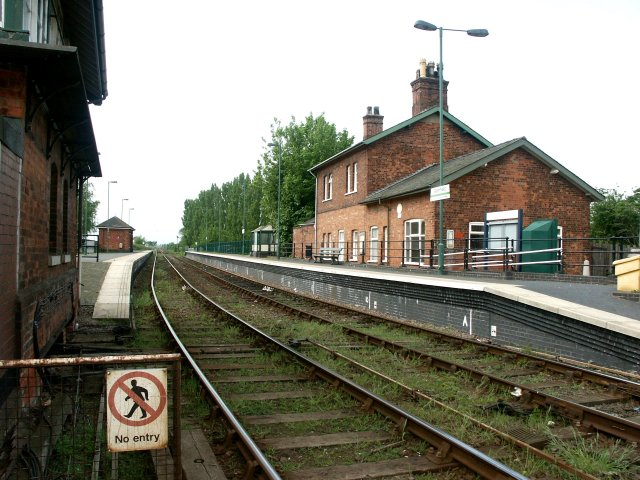

General information
- Location: Wainfleet All Saints, East Lindsey; England
- Coordinates: 53.105°N 0.235°E
- Grid reference: TF497587
- Manager: East Midlands Railway
- Platforms: 2

Other information
- Station code: WFL
- Classification: DfT category F1

History
- Opened: 24 October 1871
- Original company: Wainfleet and Firsby Railway
- Pre-grouping: Great Northern Railway
- Post-grouping: London and North Eastern Railway

Passengers
- 2021/22: ▲32,612
- 2022/23: ▲40,994
- 2023/24: ▼40,460
- 2024/25: ▲47,824
- 2025/26: ▲55,060
Location
Notes
- Passenger statistics from the Office of Rail and Road

Wainfleet railway station serves the town of Wainfleet All Saints in Lincolnshire, England. It is a stop on the Poacher Line between Skegness and Grantham; it is located 5 miles (8 km) west of Skegness. The station is owned by Network Rail and managed by East Midlands Railway, which provides all rail services.

== History ==
The station was opened by the Wainfleet and Firsby Railway for passenger traffic on 24 October 1871. The passenger service was extended from Wainfleet to Skegness on 28 July 1873.

On 23 June 1881, there was an accident on a service from Skegness to Nottingham. A carriage left the rails at Wainfleet, which derailed the carriages behind it, resulting in injuries to several passengers including one with a broken leg.

From 1896, the Wainfleet and Firsby Railway was taken over by the Great Northern Railway.

The station has its own signal box at the east end of the platforms, which is next to the level crossing.

== Facilities ==
The station is unstaffed and offers limited facilities other than two shelters, bicycle storage, timetables and modern help points. There are no ticket retail facilities at this station, so the full range of tickets for travel can be purchased from the guard on the train at no extra cost.

== Services ==
All services at Wainfleet are operated by East Midlands Railway. There is an hourly service westbound to Nottingham, via Grantham, and eastbound to Skegness.

Preceding station	National Rail	Following station
Boston	East Midlands Railway Poacher Line	Skegness
Thorpe Culvert Limited service	East Midlands Railway Poacher Line	Havenhouse Limited service
	Disused railways	
Thorpe Culvert	Great Northern Railway Firsby to Skegness railway branch line	Havenhouse

== See also ==
- Firsby to Skegness railway branch line
