= Wainfleet All Saints =

Ancient port and market town in Lincolnshire, England

Coordinates: 53.108°N 0.237°E

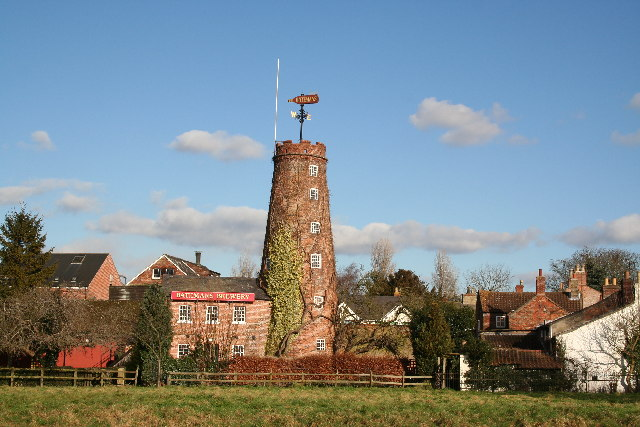
- Salem Bridge Mill, Wainfleet

- Location within Lincolnshire
- Population: 1,604 (2011 census)
- OS grid reference: TF498591
  - London: 115 mi (185 km) S
- Civil parish: Wainfleet All Saints
- District: East Lindsey
- Shire county: Lincolnshire
- Region: East Midlands
- Country: England
- Sovereign state: United Kingdom
- Post town: Skegness
- Postcode district: PE24
- Dialling code: 01754
- Police: Lincolnshire
- Fire: Lincolnshire
- Ambulance: East Midlands
- UK Parliament: Boston and Skegness

Wainfleet All Saints is a market town and civil parish in the East Lindsey district of Lincolnshire, England. It is located on the A52 road, 5 miles (8 km) south-west of Skegness and 14 miles (23 km) north-east of Boston. It stands on two small rivers, the Steeping and Limb (or Lymn), that form Wainfleet Haven. The town is close to the Lincolnshire Wolds. The village of Wainfleet St Mary is to the south. In 2011, the parish had a population of 1,604.

== History ==
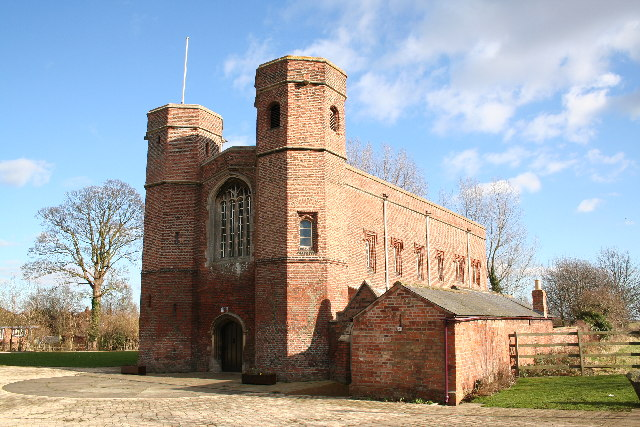
Magdalen College School building, now a museum

The name "Wainfleet" is derived from Wegn fleot, a stream that can be crossed by a wagon (compare with 'wainwright', a maker of wagons). The town stands on or near the former Roman settlement of Vainona. Two tumuli, one to the north and one to the south of the town, are of unknown origin, although it has been suggested that they could be Viking or Roman. A number of coins from the period have been found in the vicinity. In the Domesday Book of 1086, Wainfleet is referred to as 'Wenflet'.

== Parish Church ==
Church of All Saints, Wainfleet

The parish church of All Saints was built in 1820-21 following the demolition of a previous medieval church of the same dedication, using part of the old church's material. A further church, St Thomas, had been destroyed by then. During the demolition of All Saints the tomb of Richard Patten, father of William of Waynflete, was broken up, but it was later restored within Waynflete's Magdalen College Chapel, Oxford.

== Landmarks ==
William of Waynflete founded the town's Magdalen College School in 1484 and obtained for the town a charter of incorporation in 1457. The school building is Grade I listed and houses a museum.

In 1847 Barkham Street, a 'London-style' terrace, was commissioned by Bethlem Hospital and built to the design of Sydney Smirke and to specifications similar to other Bethlem terraces in Southwark, London.

The Market Place has two Grade II listed structures: a clock tower erected in 1899, and a 15th-century limestone Buttercross (set on three steps and topped with a 19th-century finial and weathervane), from which John Wesley preached.

The town is notable for Batemans Brewery; the brewery building incorporates the Georgian Salem House and a former corn mill, Salem Bridge Mill. Public houses in Wainfleet are the Woolpack Hotel and The Angel on High Street. Former pubs included the Jolly Sailor (St Johns Street) and the Royal Oak and the Red Lion (both on High Street and now residential).

Wainfleet became a conservation area in 1972.

== Education ==
Skegness Grammar School has a boarding house in the town on Low Road.

=== Transport ===
The town was at the end of a branch of the Great Northern Railway until the development of Skegness about 6 miles (10 km) to the east. Wainfleet railway station is on Station Road, and is on the Nottingham to Skegness Line.

=== Sport ===
Meetings of the Motorcycle Grasstrack Racing are hosted by the Wainfleet & District Sporting Motorcycle Club. They have run annually the International Lincolnshire Poacher race since 1992. The club have also hosted the British Masters Championship on four occasions in 1997, 1998, 2002, 2004. In 2011 the club hosted the European Grasstrack Championship Final at their home at Thorpe St Peter.

== Media ==
Local news and television programmes are provided by BBC Yorkshire and Lincolnshire and ITV Yorkshire. Television signals are received from the Belmont TV transmitter.

Local radio stations are BBC Radio Lincolnshire, Greatest Hits Radio Lincolnshire and Hits Radio Lincolnshire.

The town is served by the local newspapers, Skegness Standard and Lincolnshire Echo.

== Northolme ==
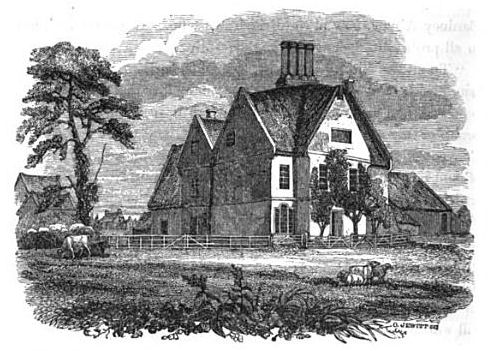
The first Northolme Hall

At the northern end of Wainfleet All Saints is the hamlet of Northolme, which is all that remains of the lost parish of Wainfleet St Thomas.

No distinction was made between Wainfleet All Saints, Wainfleet St Mary, and Wainfleet St Thomas, until a deed from Peter De Beningword to Bardney Abbey mentions North Wenfled. The original deed held in the British Library is undated, but is estimated to be from the 13th century.

In 1316 Wainfleet St Thomas is mentioned as paying tax under Feudal Aid. At the time of the Reformation, the chapel belonged to Kyme Priory. There is no clear indication of when it was demolished, but it was still standing at the time of the Protectorate, when the general Baptists were granted its use. Nothing remains of the chapel today, although its site is used as an extension of the present cemetery.

In 1546 Thomas Lyttlebury was heir to the manor of Northolme through his brother John. However, it seems that the estate became the property of John's daughter, Alice, who married Thomas Upton. Thomas Upton's successors lived at Northolme Hall.

The first Northolme Hall was an Elizabethan moated manor house, reputedly built in 1549. The present Northolme Hall was built on the same site in 1866.

== Population ==
Population of Wainfleet All Saints Civil Parish

Year	Population	±%
1801	506	—
1811	690	+36.4%
1821	878	+27.2%
1831	1,135	+29.3%
1841	1,386	+22.1%
1851	1,365	−1.5%

Year	Population	±%
1871	1,355	−0.7%
1881	1,349	−0.4%
1891	1,446	+7.2%
1901	1,233	−14.7%
1911	1,258	+2.0%
1921	1,375	+9.3%

Year	Population	±%
1931	1,324	−3.7%
1951	1,356	+2.4%
1961	1,184	−12.7%
2001	1,534	+29.6%
2011	1,604	+4.6%

== Geography ==
Wainfleet is located south of Skegness and north of Boston on the A52.

Work on the A52 bypass started in February 1990, costing £1.82m. Construction took 60 weeks, being built by Lincway Construction, a division of the county council, The bypass opened in February 1991.

=== Climate ===
Climate data for Wainfleet (1991–2020)
Month	Jan	Feb	Mar	Apr	May	Jun	Jul	Aug	Sep	Oct	Nov	Dec	Year
Mean daily maximum °C (°F)	7.0 (44.6)	7.6 (45.7)	9.9 (49.8)	12.6 (54.7)	15.6 (60.1)	18.5 (65.3)	20.9 (69.6)	21.3 (70.3)	18.4 (65.1)	14.3 (57.7)	10.1 (50.2)	7.3 (45.1)	13.7 (56.7)
Mean daily minimum °C (°F)	1.9 (35.4)	1.8 (35.2)	3.0 (37.4)	4.7 (40.5)	7.4 (45.3)	10.2 (50.4)	12.2 (54.0)	12.3 (54.1)	10.3 (50.5)	8.0 (46.4)	4.4 (39.9)	2.1 (35.8)	6.5 (43.7)
Average rainfall mm (inches)	50.7 (2.00)	40.9 (1.61)	38.1 (1.50)	38.9 (1.53)	48.4 (1.91)	56.6 (2.23)	58.1 (2.29)	62.7 (2.47)	52.0 (2.05)	65.3 (2.57)	59.5 (2.34)	54.6 (2.15)	625.8 (24.64)
Average rainy days (≥ 1 mm)	11.3	10.3	8.8	8.2	8.1	9.3	9.6	9.8	8.7	11.2	12.4	11.8	119.6
Source: Met Office

== See also ==
- RAF Wainfleet - local bombing range.
