= Poacher Line =

Railway line in Lincolnshire, England

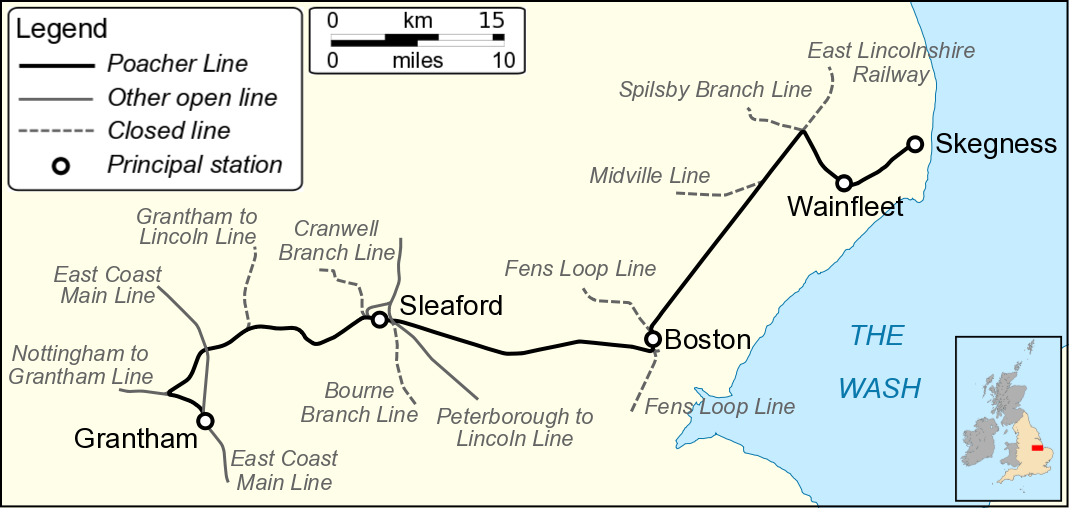
- Poacher Line

Overview
- Status: Operational
- Owner: Network Rail
- Locale: Lincolnshire; East Midlands
- Termini: Skegness; Nottingham
- Stations: 19

Service
- Type: Heavy rail
- System: National Rail
- Operator: East Midlands Railway
- Rolling stock: Class 170 Turbostar; Class 158 Express Sprinter

History
- Opened: 1848-1873

Technical
- Number of tracks: Two (one from Sleaford to Heckington and Hubberts Bridge to Sibsey, with a passing loop at Boston)
- Track gauge: 1,435 mm (4 ft 8 1/2 in) standard gauge

The Grantham–Skegness line, promoted originally as the Poacher Line, runs for 55 miles (89 km) between Grantham and Skegness in Lincolnshire, England. Trains on this route generally operate hourly from Nottingham to Skegness via the Nottingham to Grantham Line, with additional slower stopping services at peak times. The line is operated by East Midlands Railway, using Class 170 Turbostar and Class 158 Express Sprinter diesel multiple units.

== History ==
The East Lincolnshire Railway from Boston to Louth opened in March 1848; the section from Grantham to Boston was built by the Boston, Sleaford and Midland Counties Railway, opening in two stages in 1857 and 1859. In due course, both concerns were leased and later absorbed by the Great Northern Railway company. The section from Wainfleet to Skegness opened in August 1873, by the Wainfleet and Firsby Railway Company, later owned by the GNR in the late 1890s).

The GNR amalgamated with other railways to create the LNER at the start of 1923. When other nearby lines were still open, it became a less important route, except for its section from Boston to Firsby which was shared with the more important Peterborough to Grimsby line, via Louth, until October 1970; this resulted in the line's unusually sharp curve in the track near Firsby where it joins the Skegness line (which was originally opened as a branch from Firsby). This also had a section from here to Woodhall Spa and on to Lincoln. There had never been a direct line built from Skegness to Mablethorpe; travellers to Mablethorpe would have to go either via the branch line from Willoughby (from the south which opened in October 1886) or Louth (from the north which opened in September 1888).

The Skegness part of the line inspired the famous poster, designed in 1908 for the GNR.

Class 156 Super Sprinter DMUs no longer operate on the line, as they have been retired by East Midlands Railway; in 2023, they were replaced with Class 170 Turbostar DMUs.

== Community rail line ==
The route was selected as one of the seven pilot schemes under the Department for Transport's Community Rail Development Strategy in 2005 and was designated formally as a community rail service in July 2006. Passenger use of the line has grown since becoming a community rail line and the Poacher Line Community Rail Partnership actively promotes the route through marketing promotions, ticketing offers, music trains and guided walks.

Redundant space at stations at Sleaford and Boston is being brought back into community use. Members of the Partnership include Lincolnshire County Council, East Midlands Railway, Association of Community Rail Partnerships and Network Rail.

Nottinghamshire County Council was invited to join the partnership and became a full member in 2007.

== Route ==
The line is named after the traditional local song, Lincolnshire Poacher.

Trains and train crews operating the Poacher Line are based at Boston and Nottingham. Nottingham to Skegness takes between 1 hour 50 minutes and 2 hours 15 minutes. A couple of express Skegness-Sleaford-Nottingham trains run avoiding Grantham; these also call at Wainfleet, Boston, Heckington and Bingham. The last evening train at 9pm from Skegness is an express to Nottingham avoiding Grantham. Grantham to Skegness takes about 1 hour 30 minutes on the Poacher Line.

As well as providing the only rail service for Boston and Skegness, the line also provides the most frequent and reliable service from Sleaford to reach London. Sleaford can be accessed by a second route, the Peterborough to Lincoln Line; however, this has services which do not run late at night nor on Sundays. In 2007, Central Trains, the then operator, announced that longer trains would be used on the line as overcrowding at weekends has become a severe problem.

In November 2005, it was reported that the section between Boston and Skegness was unable to take heavier trains although work to enhance the track took place during winter 2009/10. The line is not electrified and is single track from Sleaford to Heckington and Hubbert's Bridge to Sibsey, with a passing loop at Boston. These were singled in the early 1980s to reduce track maintenance costs.

East Midlands Trains took over the operation of all routes in the East Midlands in November 2007 and have in the past expressed an interest in running London–Skegness trains on summer Saturdays. This has been delayed by Network Rail putting back the track repairs between Boston and Skegness to 2010.

== Allington Chord ==
When part of the line was shared with the East Coast Main Line, there was a common bottleneck on the three miles north of Grantham to the Barkston South junction, which held up valuable slots on a more important route. A solution was needed urgently to reroute Poacher Line trains.

In October 2005, trains heading for Skegness were diverted back towards Nottingham as far as Allington junction, a new £11 million short section of track, which was built to allow trains to head on to the Grantham Avoiding Line. This has increased reliability at the expense of a slightly increased standard journey time.
