= Skegness railway station =

Railway station in Lincolnshire, England

Skegness
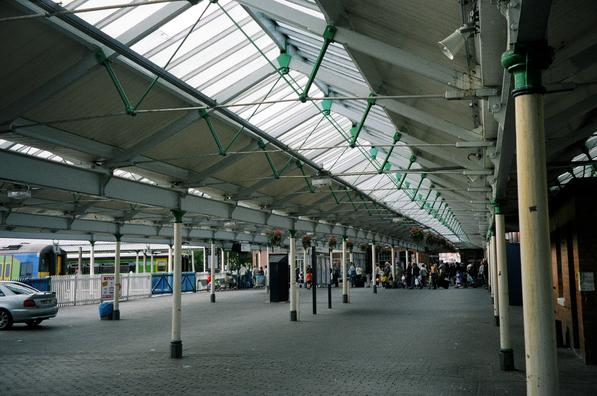
- The station concourse

General information
- Location: Skegness, East Lindsey; England
- Coordinates: 53.143°N 0.334°E
- Grid reference: TF562631
- Managed by: East Midlands Railway
- Platforms: 6 (4 in use)

Other information
- Station code: SKG
- Classification: DfT category E

History
- Opened: 1873
- Original company: Wainfleet and Firsby Railway
- Pre-grouping: Great Northern Railway
- Post-grouping: London and North Eastern Railway

Key dates
- 28 July 1873: Station opened

Passengers
- 2020/21: ▼112,520
- 2021/22: ▲306,608
- 2022/23: ▲359,744
- 2023/24: ▼358,304
- 2024/25: ▲397,520
Location
Notes
- Passenger statistics from the Office of Rail and Road

Skegness railway station serves the seaside resort of Skegness in Lincolnshire, England, at the eastern terminus of the Poacher Line. The station is now owned by Network Rail and managed by East Midlands Railway, which operates all services that run to and from Nottingham.

== History ==
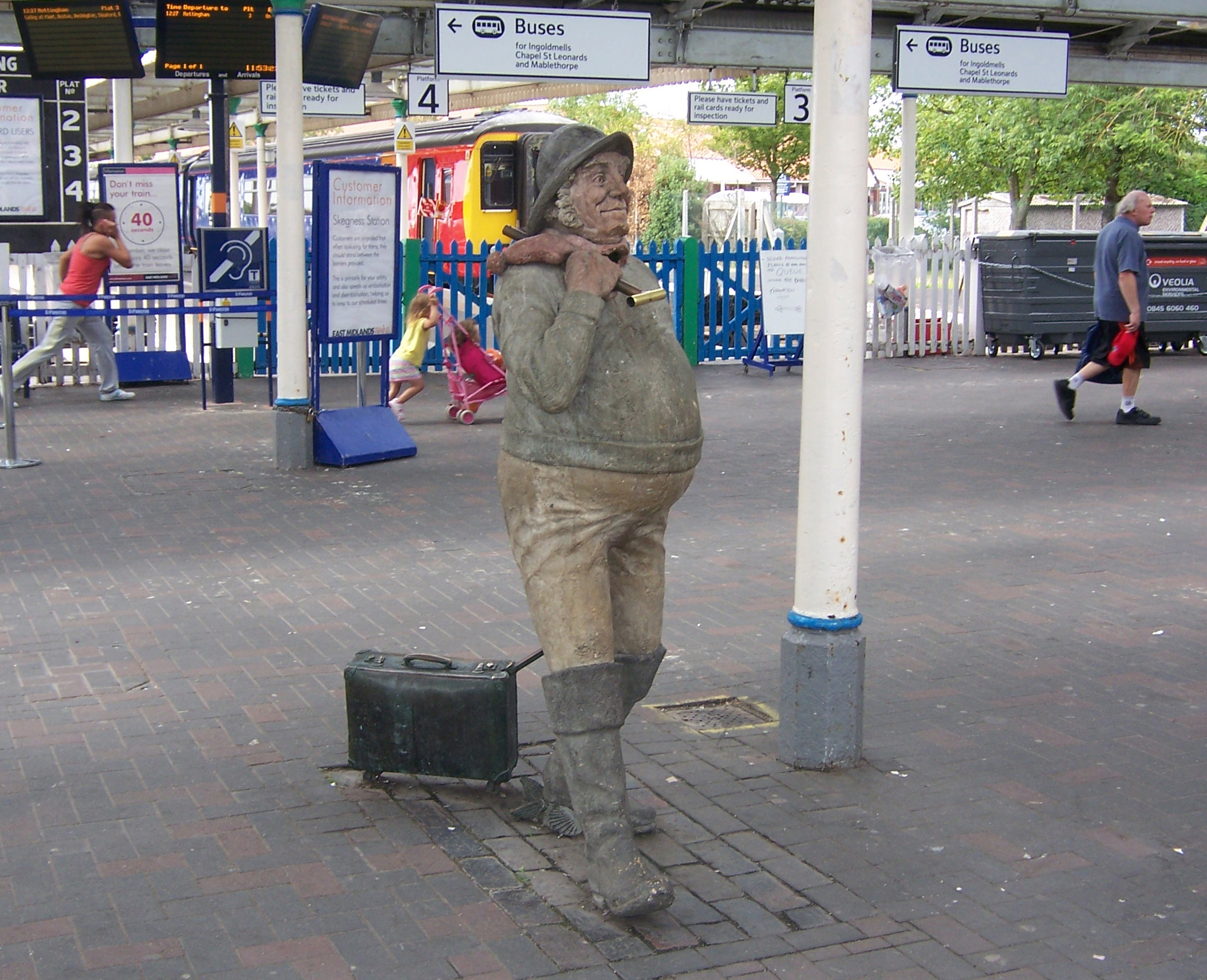
Statue of the Jolly Fisherman

The line to Wainfleet was opened in August 1871 by the Wainfleet and Firsby Railway. This line was then extended to Skegness; the station opened on 28 July 1873.

Skegness was dubbed "the Blackpool of the East Coast" or "Nottingham by the Sea". It has a mascot, the Jolly Fisherman, designed by John Hassall in 1908 for the Great Northern Railway; its slogan, "Skegness is so bracing", is a reference to the chilly prevailing north-easterly winds that can and frequently do blow off the North Sea. A statue of The Jolly Fisherman now greets passengers as they arrive at the station, when entering through the main entrance.

Up until 1966, the railway station had a goods yard with sheds; however, this area, along with platform one, was demolished between 1980 and 1983. This area is now used as a car park belonging to nearby offices. Seacroft railway station was located just outside Skegness, but this has also now closed. The next station on the line is Havenhouse.

In 2006, all locomotive-hauled services to Skegness were halted due to the weight of the locos buckling the rails frequently; however, this ban has since been lifted after Network Rail began a track renewal scheme which is now entering the final phase.

=== Remodelling in 2011 ===
Network Rail and Lincolnshire County Council announced a major renovation programme costing £290,000, which has seen the derelict buildings demolished, the customer toilets being modernised and the gents relocated. There was much debate in Skegness about the old stationmaster's house being part of Skegness' heritage and should have been refurbished, rather than demolished.

== Facilities ==
The current station has toilet facilities, with a baby change and a specialist service for the disabled and a small refreshment/newsagent stall. There is 24-hour CCTV in operation at this station and there are staff patrolling the concourse area to give information when trains are due to arrive or depart. There is also a ticket office, staffed for part of the traffic day and a self-service ticket vending machine (TVM) has been installed; this also enables customers who have booked their tickets online to collect them outside office hours.

Six platforms remain in place (numbered 2 to 7); however platforms 2 and 7 are now out of use and in practice only two platforms (4 and 5) are used regularly.

== Services ==
Skegness has an hourly service to Nottingham, via Grantham; services are operated by East Midlands Railway.

Preceding station	National Rail	Following station
Wainfleet	East Midlands Railway Poacher Line	Terminus
Havenhouse Limited service	East Midlands Railway Poacher Line	Terminus
	Disused railways	
Seacroft	Great Northern Railway; Firsby to Skegness railway branch line	Terminus

== Connections ==
The station has good public transport links:

- Adjacent to the railway station is the town's bus station, which facilitates frequent services up the coast as far as Mablethorpe, Louth and Alford. There are also routes to Lincoln and Boston. Routes are operated predominantly by Stagecoach East.
- There is a taxi rank at the front of the station.
