= Westborough and Dry Doddington =

Civil parish in Lincolnshire, England

Coordinates: 53.011°N 0.734°W

- Civil Parish
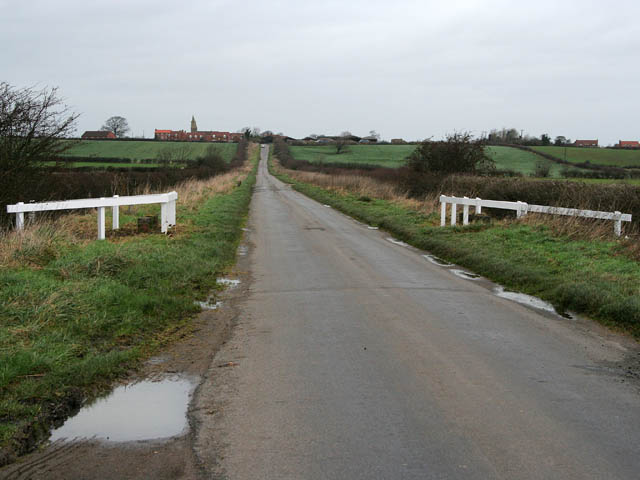
- Road between Westborough and Dry Doddington, with Dry Doddington church in the distance

- Location within Lincolnshire
- Population: 335
- OS grid reference: SK850466
- District: South Kesteven
- Shire county: Lincolnshire
- Region: East Midlands
- Country: England
- Sovereign state: United Kingdom
- Post town: Newark
- Postcode district: NG23
- Dialling code: 01400
- Police: Lincolnshire
- Fire: Lincolnshire
- Ambulance: East Midlands
- UK Parliament: Grantham and Bourne

Westborough and Dry Doddington is a civil parish in the north-west of South Kesteven in the county of Lincolnshire. The population of the civil parish was 335 at the 2001 census increasing to 365 at the 2011 census.

== Geography ==
It comprises the two villages of Westborough and Dry Doddington, to the north. The parish is mostly between Long Bennington and the East Coast Main Line.

To the west, the parish follows the River Witham next to Long Bennington parish then follows the east side of the A1, crossing Doddington Lane. Passing through Holmes Farm it reaches the Nottinghamshire boundary a few hundred metres east of Shire Bridge on the A1. The parish boundary, with Balderton, becomes the county and South Kesteven boundary for around three hundred metres, then follows a hedge south-east to the south of Claypole Mill Farm, where it crosses the River Witham. It crosses the road to Claypole and at Long Plantation near a mobile phone mast it crosses the East Coast Main Line. To the north-east of Littlegates Farm it follows a drain southwards to north of where it crosses the ECML. It follows a drain to the south-west on the eastern edge of the NG23 postcode. It follows the drain southwards from here for two hundred metres to the River Witham which it follows to Long Bennington, being crossed twice by the Viking Way at Westborough and Long Bennington.

== History ==
The parish began as the religious parish of All Saints at Westborough, with a chapel at Dry Doddington. The division between the two religious parishes follows Doddington Lane to the A1.
