= Westborough, Lincolnshire =

Village in the South Kesteven district of Lincolnshire, England

Coordinates: 52.99438°N 0.73252°W

Westborough
- Village
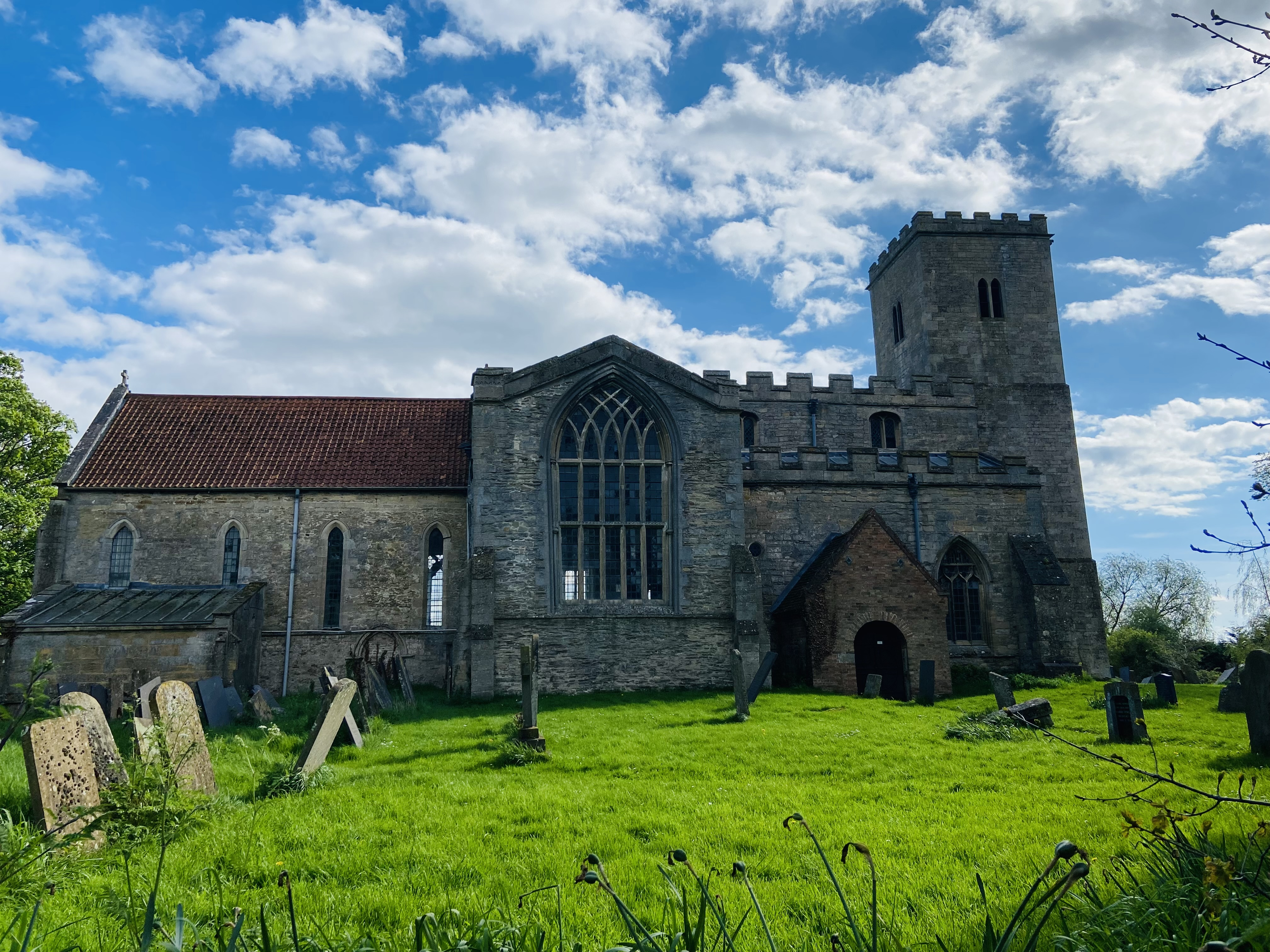
- All Saints Church

- Location within Lincolnshire
- OS grid reference: SK851448
  - London: 105 mi (169 km) SSE
- Civil parish: Westborough and Dry Doddington
- District: South Kesteven
- Shire county: Lincolnshire
- Region: East Midlands
- Country: England
- Sovereign state: United Kingdom
- Post town: NEWARK
- Postcode district: NG23
- Police: Lincolnshire
- Fire: Lincolnshire
- Ambulance: East Midlands
- UK Parliament: Grantham and Bourne
- Website: https://westborough-dry-doddington.parish.lincolnshire.gov.uk/parish-information

Westborough is a village in the civil parish of Westborough and Dry Doddington, in the South Kesteven district of Lincolnshire, England. It is situated 1 mile (1.6 km) east from the A1 road and Long Bennington, and 6 miles (10 km) north from Grantham. In 1921 the parish had a population of 132. On 1 April 1931 the parish was abolished and merged with Dry Doddington to form "Westborough and Dry Doddington".

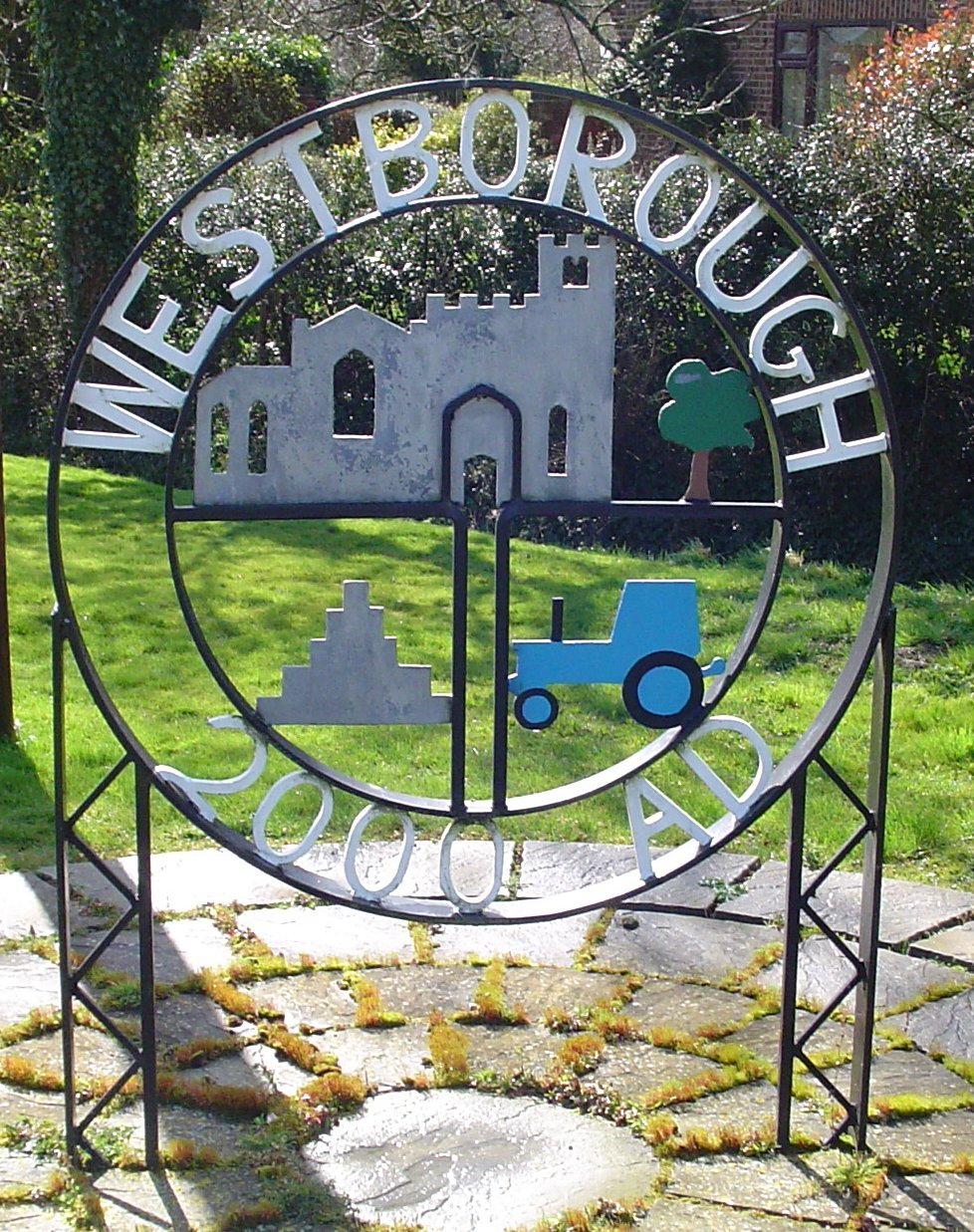
Signpost

Nearby to the north is Dry Doddington. The Viking Way and River Witham pass through the village.

The name 'Westborough' means 'west fortification'.

The village Grade I listed Anglican church is dedicated to All Saints.

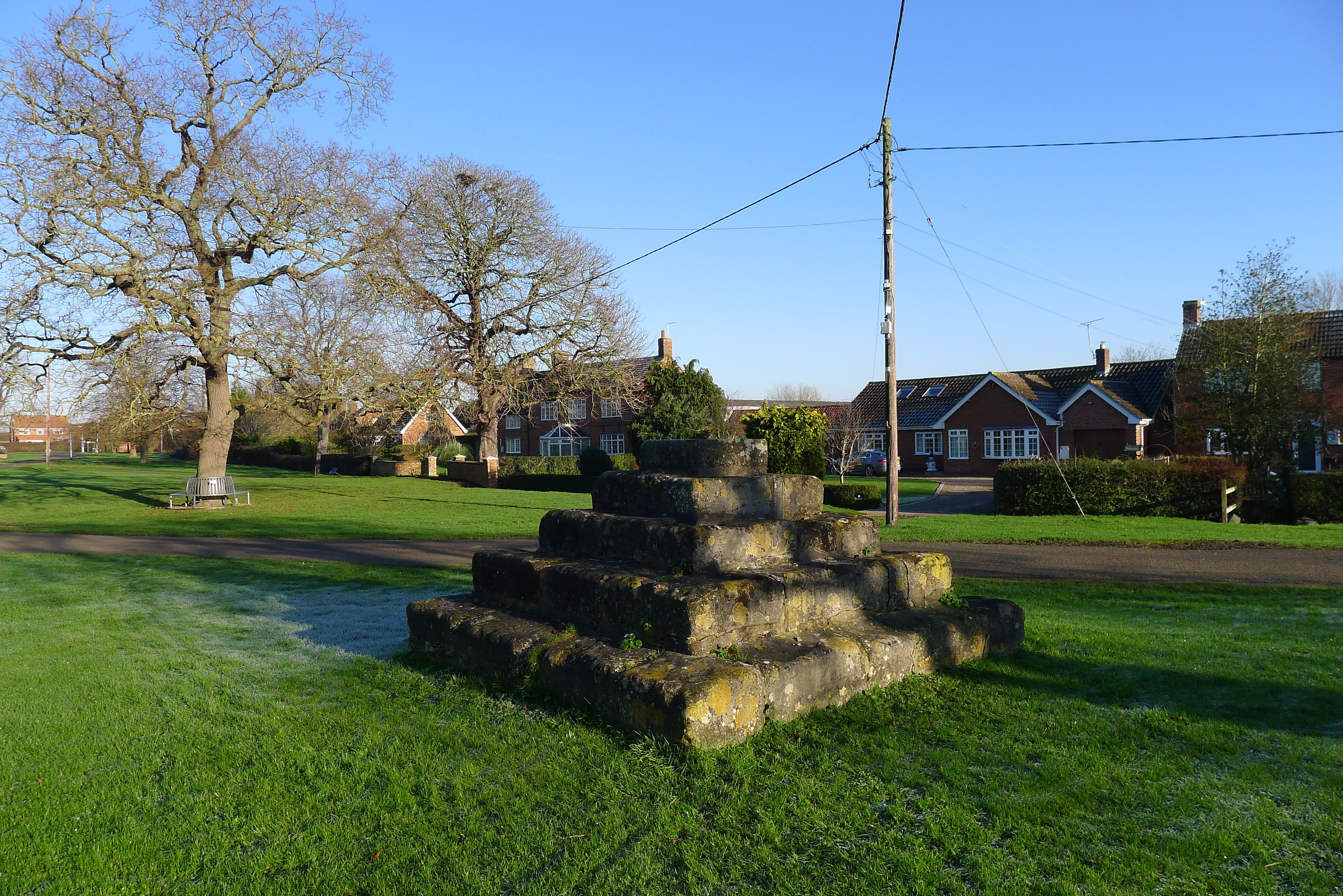
The Cross
