= Stubton =

Village in Lincolnshire, England

Coordinates: 53.030081°N 0.69992°W

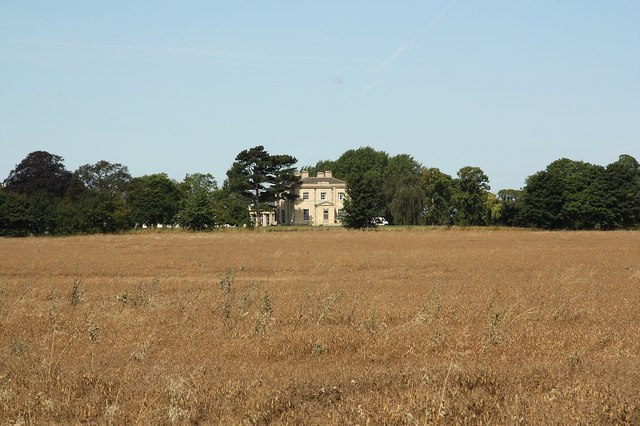
- Stubton Hall

- Location within Lincolnshire
- Population: 295 (2011)
- OS grid reference: SK872488
  - London: 110 mi (180 km) S
- District: South Kesteven
- Shire county: Lincolnshire
- Region: East Midlands
- Country: England
- Sovereign state: United Kingdom
- Post town: NEWARK
- Postcode district: NG23
- Dialling code: 01636
- Police: Lincolnshire
- Fire: Lincolnshire
- Ambulance: East Midlands
- UK Parliament: Grantham and Bourne

Stubton is a small village and civil parish in the South Kesteven district of Lincolnshire, England. The population of the civil parish (including Fenton) at the 2011 census was 295. The village is situated 8 miles (13 km) north from Grantham and 5 miles (8 km) south-east from Newark-on-Trent in Nottinghamshire. Adjacent villages include Claypole, Dry Doddington, Beckingham and Brandon.

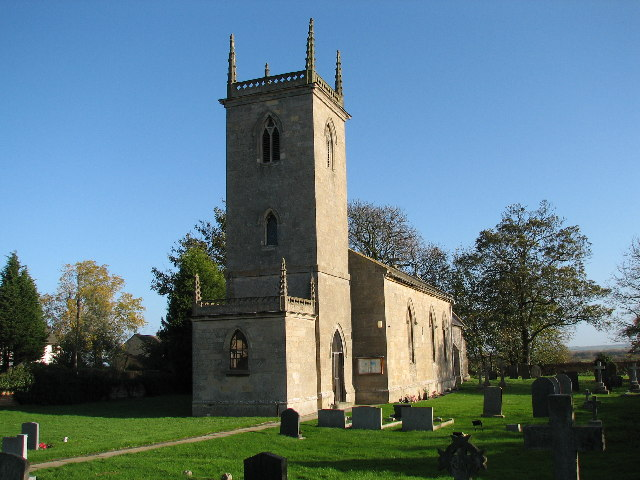
Saint Martin's Church, Stubton

The parish church is a Grade II* listed building dedicated to Saint Martin, built in 1799, with a chancel added in 1869.

Stubton Hall is a large Grade II listed country house, built in 1813-14 by Sir Jeffry Wyatville for Sir Robert Heron, 2nd Baronet. In 1918 it was purchased by Sir Edmund Royds. After his death in 1946 it was purchased by Lincolnshire County Council, and from 1952 to 2003 it was used as a boarding school, and is now a hotel and wedding venue.

== Community ==
The ecclesiastical parish of Stubton is part of the Claypole Group of the Deanery of Lovedon.

The Village won the Lincolnshire 'Best Kept Village' competition in 2012, 2021 and runner-up in 2022.

Stubton has a modern brick-built village hall, built with Millennial funding from the National Lottery.

The village is served on school days by Sleafordian bus route SL10 from Claypole to Sleaford, and on demand by the Call Connect bus service.
