= Claypole =

Claypole may refer to:

== People ==
- Edward Waller Claypole, a palaeontologist
- Elizabeth Claypole (1629–1658), the second daughter of Oliver Cromwell
- John Claypole (1625–1688), an officer in the Parliamentary army during the English Civil War

== Fiction ==
- Noah Claypole, a character in Oliver Twist

== Places ==
- Claypole, Lincolnshire, a village in the South Kesteven district of Lincolnshire, England
  - Claypole railway station, a former station in Claypole, Lincolnshire
- Claypole Rural District, a former local government area in Lincolnshire
- Claypole, Buenos Aires
  - Club Atlético Claypole, an Argentine Football club
