= GLG =

GLG may refer to:

- Geelong railway station, Australia
- Gerson Lehrman Group
- Glengarnock railway station, Scotland, National Rail station code
- GLG Partners
- The Great Lakes Group
- GLG Grand
- Gmeinder Lokomotivenfabrik GmbH, part of the Gmeinder company
- glg, ISO 639-3 and ISO 639-2 code for Galician language
