= Fenton, South Kesteven =

Village in the South Kesteven district of Lincolnshire, England

Coordinates: 53.048204°N 0.688312°W

Fenton
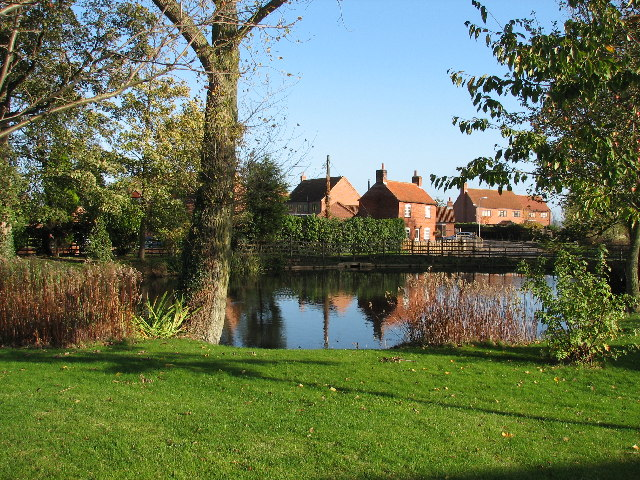
- Village pond, Fenton

- Location within Lincolnshire
- OS grid reference: SK880509
  - London: 100 mi (160 km) S
- District: South Kesteven
- Shire county: Lincolnshire
- Region: East Midlands
- Country: England
- Sovereign state: United Kingdom
- Post town: Newark
- Postcode district: NG23
- Police: Lincolnshire
- Fire: Lincolnshire
- Ambulance: East Midlands
- UK Parliament: Sleaford and North Hykeham

Fenton is a village in the South Kesteven district of Lincolnshire, England. It is situated 14 miles (23 km) south-west from the city and county town of Lincoln, 2 miles (3.2 km) north-east from the village of Claypole and 1.5 miles (2.4 km) south from the A17 road.

Fenton Grade I listed Anglican church is dedicated to All Saints. It has a crocketed spire and is mainly of Perpendicular and Decorated style, but retains a Norman north arcade. The chancel was rebuilt in 1838 and restored in 1875.
