= Doddington =

Doddington could refer to

== Places in England ==
- Doddington, Cambridgeshire
- Doddington, Cheshire
- Doddington, Kent
- Doddington, Lincolnshire
- Doddington, Northumberland
- Dry Doddington, Lincolnshire
- Great Doddington, Northamptonshire

== Ships ==
- Doddington (East Indiaman), wrecked in Algoa Bay, South Africa in 1755

== See also ==
- Dodington (disambiguation)
