= Hougham, Lincolnshire =

Village and civil parish in the South Kesteven district of Lincolnshire, England

Coordinates: 52.990531°N 0.683022°W

Hougham
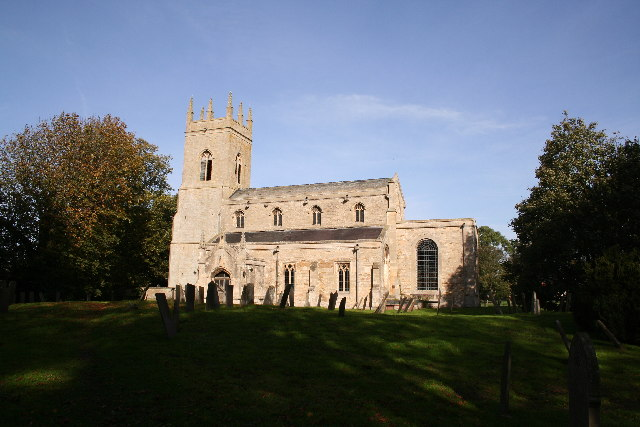
- Church of All Saints, Hougham

- Location within Lincolnshire
- OS grid reference: SK890444
  - London: 100 mi (160 km) S
- Civil parish: Hougham
- District: South Kesteven
- Shire county: Lincolnshire
- Region: East Midlands
- Country: England
- Sovereign state: United Kingdom
- Post town: Grantham
- Postcode district: NG32
- Police: Lincolnshire
- Fire: Lincolnshire
- Ambulance: East Midlands

Hougham (/ˈhɒfəm/) is a village and civil parish in the South Kesteven district of Lincolnshire, England, 6 miles (10 km) north from Grantham. The village of Marston, Lincolnshire is its closest neighbour, just under 1 mile (1.6 km) to the south.

== History ==
A fair and market were both founded in 1330.

The village once had its own railway station on the line between Grantham and Newark.

== Community ==
Hougham church is dedicated to All Saints. It is built in Norman style, and contains a monument to Sir Hugh de Bussey, said to have been senior among the Knights Templar.

The ecclesiastical parish is also Hougham, part of The Barkston and Hough Group of the Loveden Deanery of the Diocese of Lincoln. As of 2014, the incumbent is Revd Alan Littlewood.

The Manor House was built c.1620, on the site of a 13th-century manor of the De Bussey family. It has been extensively altered up to the 20th century. The original moat is still discernible.
