= Harry Coulby =

American businessman (1865-1929)

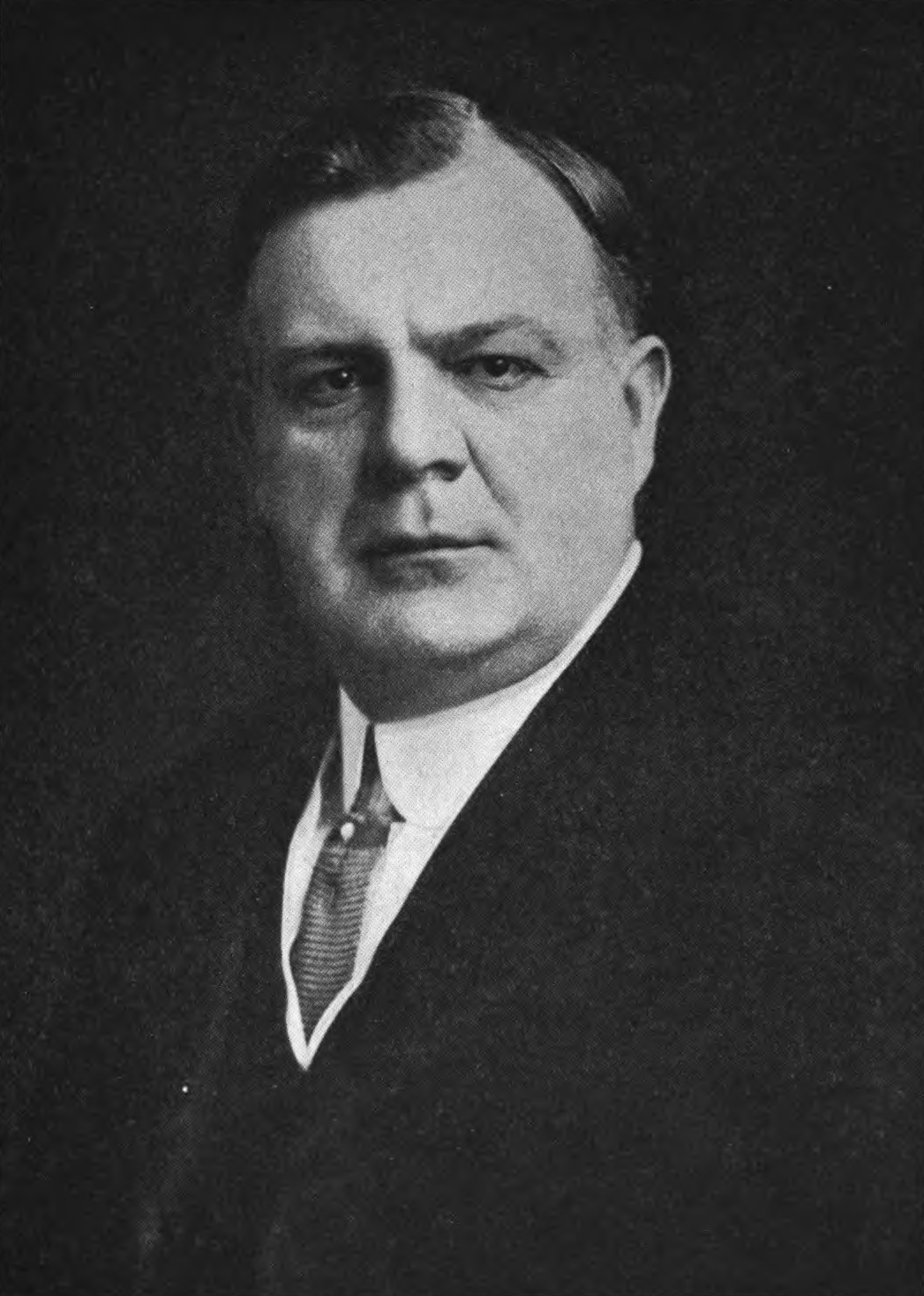
- Harry Coulby in 1919
- Born: January 1, 1865; Claypole, Lincolnshire, England, United Kingdom
- Died: January 18, 1929 (aged 64); London, United Kingdom
- Occupation: Businessman

Harry Coulby (January 1, 1865 – January 18, 1929) was an American businessman known as the "Czar of the Great Lakes" for his expertise in managing the Great Lakes shipping fleet of Pickands Mather & Company and the Pittsburgh Steamship Company. After retiring, he served as the first mayor of the newly incorporated town of Wickliffe, Ohio. His former home, Coulallenby, now serves as the city hall of Wickliffe. He chose the design for Great Lakes ore carriers in 1905 that became the standard for the next 65 years, and was elected to the National Maritime Hall of Fame in 1984.

== Early life ==
Coulby was born January 1, 1865, in Claypole, Lincolnshire, United Kingdom, to Thomas and Jane (née Bugge) Coulby. He was the fourth of seven children, and the fourth of four sons. His father was a farmer, and Coulby worked on the farm. He was educated in the local private school, and was a voracious reader. During his youth, he read about the Great Lakes and became fascinated by them. Coulby left school at the age of 11, and in the summer of 1879 at the age of 14, left home to take up residence in the town of Newark-on-Trent.

He won a position (without pay) with the London, Midland and Scottish Railway learning telegraphy. He was an expert at Morse code within three months. The company formally hired him at 12 shillings a week, and sent him to work at a telegraph station in the village of Ilkeston in Derbyshire. A year later, he was transferred to the telegraphy station at Marple, Greater Manchester, and received a raise of four shillings. In 1883, Coulby applied for and won an $800-a-year position with the British Cable Company. (Note: While the majority of sources say the firm was the British Cable Company, some say it was the West Indies and Panama Telegraph Company Havighurst implies that the West Indies and Panama Telegraph Co. was a subsidiary of the British Cable Company.) After a 26-day voyage about the steamship SS Leonora, Coulby arrived in Santiago de Cuba in Cuba.

Two months after arriving in Cuba, Coulby contracted malaria. (Note: Brown says Coulby was in Cuba just two weeks before falling ill.) Because his salary was being used to defray the cost of his travel, he had to borrow $30 to pay for his treatment. The company did not respond when he sought reimbursement for his medical care. He also found himself clashing repeatedly with a senior telegrapher. In March 1884, Coulby stowed away on the steamer SS Cienfuegos, which was bound for New York City. Still suffering from the after-effects of malaria, he was nursed to health for free by the Sisters of Charity of New York.

After two weeks in the hospital, Coulby was well enough to be discharged. Determined to reach the Great Lakes but without any money, Coulby walked more than 600 miles (970 km) from New York City to Albany, New York, and then west along the Erie Canal to Buffalo, New York. He then followed lakeshore railroad tracks to Cleveland, Ohio. During his two-week journey, he did odd jobs for pay for food, housing, and pocket money.

== Working for John Hay ==
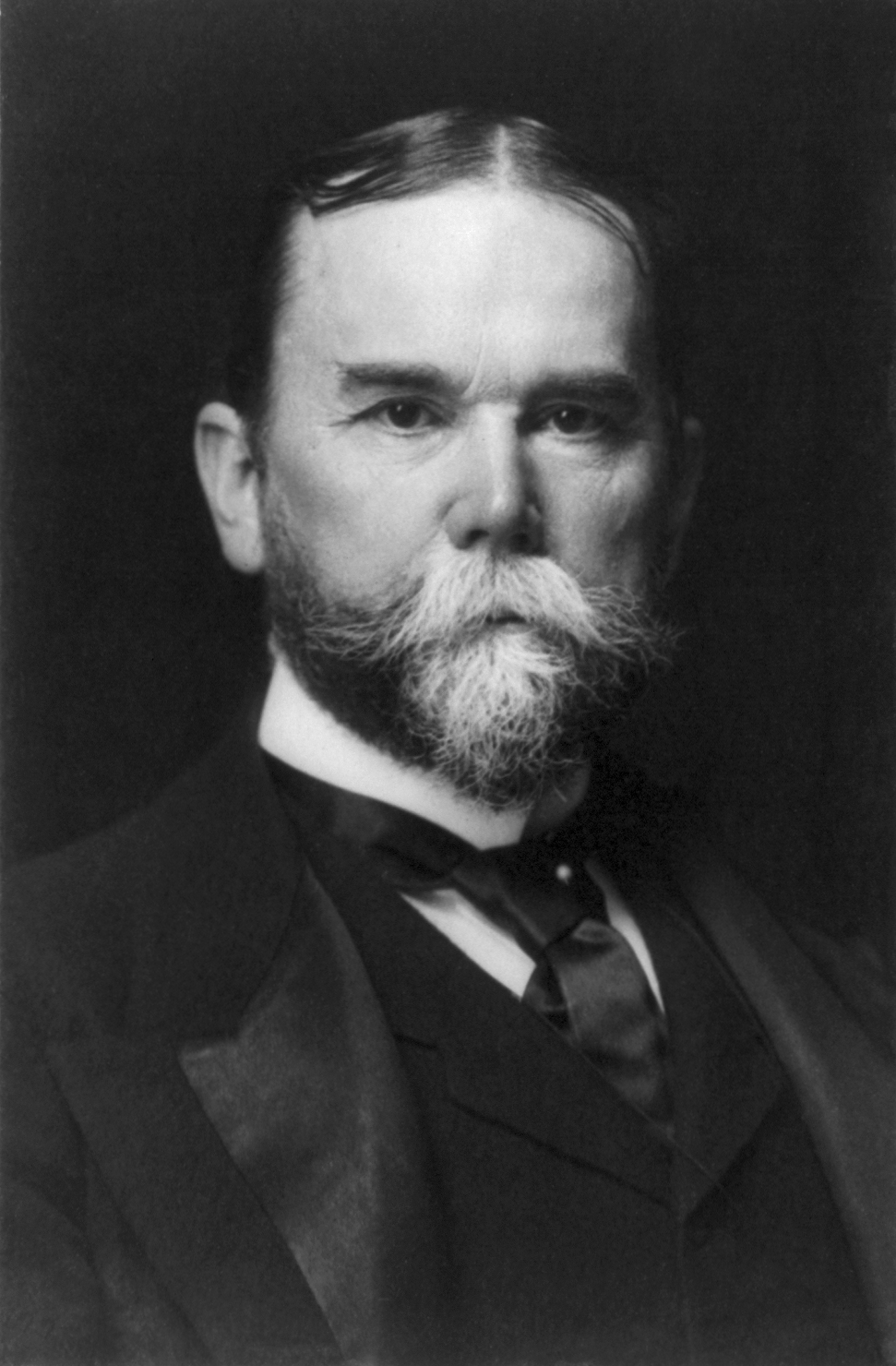
John Hay, who proved critical in launching Coulby on his career as a shipping magnate.

Coulby initially applied for a job as a deckhand aboard the Onoko, the first iron-hulled lake freighter and one of the biggest ships on the Great Lakes. Lacking experience, he was rejected. Coulby instead received work pushing wheelbarrows for a construction company. He enrolled in night school, where he learned to use the typewriter and to take shorthand. In the fall, he won a job as a $40-a-month stenographer's job with the Lake Shore and Michigan Southern Railway.

He married Amasa Stone, founder of the railroad, had two daughters, and John Hay, President Abraham Lincoln's former private secretary, had married one of them (Clara). Hay and John George Nicolay, another of Lincoln's private secretaries, had been working on a biography of Lincoln since 1874, but by 1884, Hay needed help in making further progress. Sources differ as to whether Coulby met Hay by chance in the railroad office, or whether Coulby answered a newspaper advertisement placed by Hay. But by the end of 1884, Coulby was working for Hay, transcribing notes, taking dictation, and checking facts against the extensive documents and correspondence Hay had amassed. The work left him with a lifelong admiration for Lincoln.

With work on the biography largely finished by 1886, Hay decided to move to Washington, D.C. Coulby did not want to leave Cleveland. Hay found him an $1,800-a-year government job as a stenographer, a position would have left Coulby financially secure for the rest of his life. But Coulby was ambitious and the job held no prospect for advancement, so he turned the offer down. Amasa Stone's other daughter, Flora, had married Samuel Livingston Mather II, heir to the Cleveland Iron Mining Company fortune and (in 1883) founder of the rapidly expanding mining concern Pickands Mather & Co. Hay recommended Coulby to Mather, who hired Coulby as a secretary for $50 a month on April 10, 1886.

== Shipping career ==
=== Pickands Mather ===
Pickands Mather was shipping iron ore from mines in Minnesota to steel mills all over the Great Lakes. Coulby's fascination with lakes led him to learn all he could about Great Lakes shipping: the type of boats, port facilities, weather, routes, cost, and more. As often as he could, he traveled on ships to learn their idiosyncrasies, problems, and labor issues. Coulby was quick to identify ways in which to cut costs, and ways to expand the company's business at minimal expense. He worked in several areas of the firm, but returned again and again to the Marine Department. He was made a partner in the firm in 1900.

Coulby helped plan and participated in the greatest expansion of a Great Lakes shipping fleet ever seen at that time. In 1889, Pickands Mather partner and iron mine owner Jay C. Morse, and others, organized the Minnesota Steamship Company to meet their joint shipping needs. Within three years, the firm had a fleet of nine steamers and five barges. In 1892, Pickands Mather purchased the Huron Barge Company, and the following year established a steamship coal fueling business. The firm organized the Interlake Company in 1894, and in 1895 purchased the American Steel Barge Company, which had constructed the largest whaleback shipping fleet on the Great Lakes. (Note: The fleet consisted of seven steamships and 20 barges.) In 1897, John D. Rockefeller approached Pickands Mather with a request: Build him a fleet of 12 steamships to carry iron for his Consolidated Iron Mines, Oliver Iron Mining Company, and Minnesota Iron Company. Pickands Mather had an ownership interest in Minnesota Iron, and agreed to build the fleet. Coulby was assigned to oversee the construction of the ships, which were transferred to Rockefeller's nascent Bessemer Steamship Company.

When Pickands Mather lost the contract to manage the Minnesota Steamship fleet in 1901, (Note: The Minnesota fleet became part of the Pittsburg Steamship Co. owned by U.S. Steel.) Coulby formed the Mesaba Steamship Company to compete with it. Mesaba Steamship built the large freighters Amasa Stone in 1905 and Samuel Mather 1906, and two others. He also arranged to manage the fleets of the Acme Steamship Co., Peavey Steamship Co., and Provident Steamship Co. By 1903, Coulby had oversight of a fleet of 50 steamships (although only five were directly owned by Pickands Mather). He was also a member of the Dock Managers Association, the employer organization which engaged in collective bargaining with labor unions (such as longshoremen and other workers who loaded and unloaded ship).

In early 1903, Coulby assumed the duties of President and Treasurer of Great Lakes Towing Company in addition to his work as managing partner of the Marine Department at Pickands Mather. But on December 29, 1903, he resigned this position to become President and General Manager of the Pittsburgh Steamship Company, the Great Lakes shipping division of U.S. Steel. Under the terms of this agreement, Coulby remained manager of the Marine Department of Pickands Mather.

=== Pittsburgh Steamship ===
As head of the largest Great Lakes steamship company in North America, (Note: With 110 ships, his fleet was larger than the United States Navy.) Coulby was a study in contrasts. He wore tailored suits purchased in England and smoked fine cigars. Yet, he also loved to tell stories about his life on the farm and his early weeks in America, aggressively demanded to know how much money his subordinates were making, and liked to walk the wharves to learn about his ships, weather, and navigational hazards.

Coulby's tenure as president of the fleet was marked by two major accomplishments. First, he significantly upgraded the fleet to eliminate wooden-hulled ships, replacing them with much longer and larger steel-hulled vessels. He ordered the significant redesign of Great Lakes carriers as well, eliminating the curved deck of the whalebacks which allowed for greater access to the hold. This allowed for faster loading and unloading, and less time in port (the most costly part of shipping). He also ordered the crew cabins placed atop the deck at the stern, crew cabins placed atop the forecastle, and a pilothouse atop the forecastle cabins. This freed up space belowdecks for cargo. Coulby's redesign of the Great Lakes ore carrier, first implemented with the construction of the Elbert H. Gary in 1905, became the standard for the next 65 years. He then sold off most of the older, smaller vessels. Ship crews downsized significantly, and skilled sail crews were replaced by deskilled blue-collar workers (such as firemen, oilers, and deck watchmen). Ship captains, whose judgement about a sailor's skills often was critical, now performed far more limited roles and had little input about the makeup of the crew.

Second, Coulby significantly reorganized the fleet's management and pressured labor unions for wage and benefit cuts. He moved the company headquarters from Duluth, Minnesota, to Cleveland; appointed a new vice president to supervise operations in Duluth; promoted several mid-level managers; and ordered cuts in managerial pay (sometimes as much as 48 percent). With unionization growing among steamship workers, the Lake Carriers' Association (LCA) proved critical to Coulby in implementing his employment policies. (Note: The Cleveland Vessel Owners' Association was formed in 1880 by Cleveland-area shipping companies to provide nonunion crews to ships. The Lake Carriers' Association, a group formed by package freight and passenger companies, was organized in 1885 to serve the same purpose across the Great Lakes. The two groups merged in 1892, retaining the name Lake Carriers' Association, and incorporated in 1902.) He was elected the LCA Executive Committee on January 22, 1903, and came to dominate the group. Coulby's influence came from his having been manager of the Pickands Mather fleet and Great Lakes Towing (commonly known as the "Tug Trust"), as president of the largest shipping fleet on the lakes, his company's relationship to U.S. Steel (which shipped far more ore on the lakes than any other company), and his natural aggressiveness and tendency to see himself as a "benevolent despot". Coulby immediately reorganized the LCA. The group had attempted to form a company union, the Lake Carriers' Beneficial Federation, in 1901, but this effort had failed to stem unionization.

In the early months of 1904, Coulby led the LCA in bargaining with the many small unions fighting for membership among ship and dock workers. His strategy was to negotiate incremental givebacks first, then snowball the effort into a major anti-union drive. He convinced the Marine Firemen, Oilers and Water Tenders' Union to accept a small wage cut, agree to the elimination of engineers on barges, and to permit captains to lay off workers if a ship was more than three days in port. Then the LCA forced the International Seamen's Union to agree to drop overtime pay and accept a similar layoff provision. The LCA then refused to bargain with the Marine Cooks and Stewards' Union. The union was unable to win a strike vote, and its members went back to work without a contract (accepting a sharp reduction in pay to just $70 a month). Just weeks before the shipping season began in April, Coulby fired all captains in the Pittsburgh Steamship Company fleet, and forced them to reapply for their jobs (blackballing those who had joined a union). The American Association of Masters and Pilots resisted, demanding a captain' right to join a union and a 13.6 percent wage increase (to $2,250 for a full nine months). Although many members of the LCA initially declined to support Coulby, he told them that U.S. Steel would not charter their ships if they backed down. The owners decided to support Coulby. The union went on strike, but the strike was broken on June 14, 1904, after many union members went back to work without a contract. The union never again attempted to organize ship captains. Coulby then forced his workers to sign yellow-dog contracts in 1905. When the Marine Firemen threatened to strike, Coulby won a pledge from the Lake Seamen's Union and the Marine Engineers' Beneficial Association to provide strikebreakers. The International Longshoremen's Association struck anyway on May 1, but when it received no backing from any other union the strike collapsed.

In late November 1905, the Pittsburgh Steamship Company lost 10 vessels (but, amazingly, only 12 crew members) when the Mataafa Storm struck the Great Lakes. Coulby rushed to Duluth to oversee rescue and salvage operations. Coulby responded to the disaster by rapidly building 21 Morgan-class ore freighters: True 600-foot (180 m) long freighters which were several feet wider than existing steamships.

During the 1906 and 1907 shipping seasons, Coulby quietly allowed the LCA to sign one-year contracts with a wide range of labor unions. During this time, however, iron and coal companies stockpiled large amounts of raw materials. In early 1908, Coulby announced that the Pittsburgh Steamship Co. was implementing the open shop. Engineers were required to sign yellow-dog contracts in which they agreed to their classification as management. Other LCA members went even further, enforcing the blacklist, barring union representatives from company property, and requiring all ship crews to sign oaths affirming they were not members of a labor union (and firing anyone who refused to sign or was caught breaking their oath). The LCA's anti-union effort continued the following year. Coulby helped design the LCA "welfare plan", which required all crew members to participate in a pension scheme that effectively weeded out union supporters. (Note: Wright explains how the plan worked: To belong to the plan, he had to pledge to follow company rules and pay a small monthly insurance premium. Each man would then be issued a 'continuous record discharge book' that listed his physical description and provided a history of his prior service. For each job a man held, that ship's master would mark whether his work had been good or fair. If a man's work was deemed unsatisfactory, the shipmaster could confiscate the discharge book and mail it to the Lake Carriers' Association. If a sailor died, the welfare plan would pay his designated beneficiary anywhere from $75 to $500, depending on the man's rank. In addition, the Lake Carriers' Association would set up assembly rooms in major ports where plan members could safely read, sleep, or study for advancement while waiting to be called for a job. ...[The plan] provided members of the Lake Carriers' Association with a handy way to screen out union members and exert leverage on men who were hired. After all, a man's behavior could be controlled by the threat of confiscating his discharge book and leaving him unable to get a job on another ship. Any man who quit sailing would lose the money he had paid into the welfare plan.") Several unions struck in May 1909, but the employers hired strikebreaks and the International Longshoremen's Association refused to support the strike. Feelings ran high during the strike. In 1910, union workers cut the ear off a non-union deck hand in Buffalo and mailed the ear and a letter containing a death threat to Coulby. But the unions were largely broken, even though the strike lingered into 1912. When it finally ended, what few union members remained went back to work without a contract. The open shop remained the rule among Great Lakes shipping fleets for decades to come, and unionization rates never recovered. Although some wage increases and improvements in working conditions occurred over the next half century, these were implemented at the discretion of employers because they were seen to be good business practices and not because of worker demands.

After 1907, Coulby became an increasingly confident and aggressive manager. He began holding meetings with the captains and managers of the Pittsburg and Pickands Mather fleets, coordinating their efforts and discussing schedules, loading problems, routes, navigational issues, and much more. With labor relations quiescent, the 1910, 1911, and 1912 shipping seasons were uneventful. But in early November 1913, the Great Lakes Storm of 1913 struck. The terrible storm sank 17 ships and more than 250 crewmen lost their lives. But while the Pittsburgh Steamship Co. lost several barges, only two of its large freighters were wrecked and loss of life was almost nonexistent.

By the time Coulby retired in 1924, he had expanded the "Steel Trust Fleet" into the most dominant on the Great Lakes. Under his supervision, the company built 26 600-foot (180 m) freighters and four 500-foot (150 m), and purchased three 600-foot (180 m) freighters and six 400-foot (120 m) freighters. These ships, known as "tin stackers" for the silver color of their funnels, were part of a fleet which continued to dominate Great Lakes shipping into the 1970s.

=== Interlake Steamship Co. ===
Coulby devoted his full attention to both the Pickands Mather and Pittsburgh Steamship fleets. While cost-cutting and labor issues dominated his activities at Pittsburg Steamship, he focused on expanding the Pickands Mather fleet. To finance the construction of these vessels, Pickands Mather would partner with another firm (usually a coal, iron, or steel firm). The two partners would then create a new shipping company to hold title to the vessels built. A fourth company would manage the ships. In 1906, Coulby formed the Lackawanna Steamship Co., a subsidiary of Pickands Mather, and purchased eight steamships to stock its fleet. Beginning in 1912, Henry Dalton, the president of Pickands Mather, held a meeting of all department heads to discuss the company's business. In Dalton's absence, Coulby chaired these meetings.

In May 1913, Coulby orchestrated the merger of a number of smaller independent and subsidiary steamship lines into a new company, the Interlake Steamship Company. Pickands Mather had a 100 percent interest ownership in the new line. The firm, which had started out with just a 13/20th interest in a single wooden ship, now owned a company which had 37 freighters and two barges and was the second-largest shipping fleet on the Great Lakes next to the Pittsburgh Steamship Co. The merger included the Acme Steamship Co., Gilchrist Transportation, the Huron Barge Co., the Lackawanna Steamship Co., the Mesaba Steamship Co., the Provident Steamship Co., and the Standard Steamship Co. (Note: Gilchrist Transportation contributed 17 steamers, Lackawanna Steamship Co. seven steamers, Mesaba Steamship Co. four steamers, Acme Steamship Co. three steamers, Provident Steamship Co. three steamers, Interlake Co. one steamer and one barge, Huron Barge Co. one steamer and one barge, and Standard Steamship Co. one steamer.) Coulby was named president of the new fleet.

In 1916, Coulby purchased 13 freighters from the Cleveland Steamship Co., and built its first 600-foot (180 m)-foot freighter, the Henry G. Dalton. Another six 600-foot (180 m)-foot freighters were built in 1916. These purchases brought the Interlake fleet to 52 ships, the second largest on the Great Lakes.

Coulby also became increasingly active in other areas of the company as well. In 1905, Pickands Mather invested in the By-Products Coke Corporation, which distilled coal into coke and a wide range of chemical products. Pickands Mather freighters now began hauling coke to iron foundries throughout the Great Lakes. By-Products merged with the Federal Furnace Company in 1915. In 1920, as the By-Products facilities were aging into obsolescence, Coulby and several other partners and upper-level managers backed a successful buyout of By-Products stock, making the company a wholly owned subsidiary of Pickands Mather. The company then invested heavily in upgrading and refurbishing the company plants, becoming a major manufacturer of coke and chemicals. Management of By-Products was overseen by C.D. Caldwell, who was named president of Pickands Mather's new Interlake Iron Corporation and a partner in the firm in 1929.

== Personal life ==
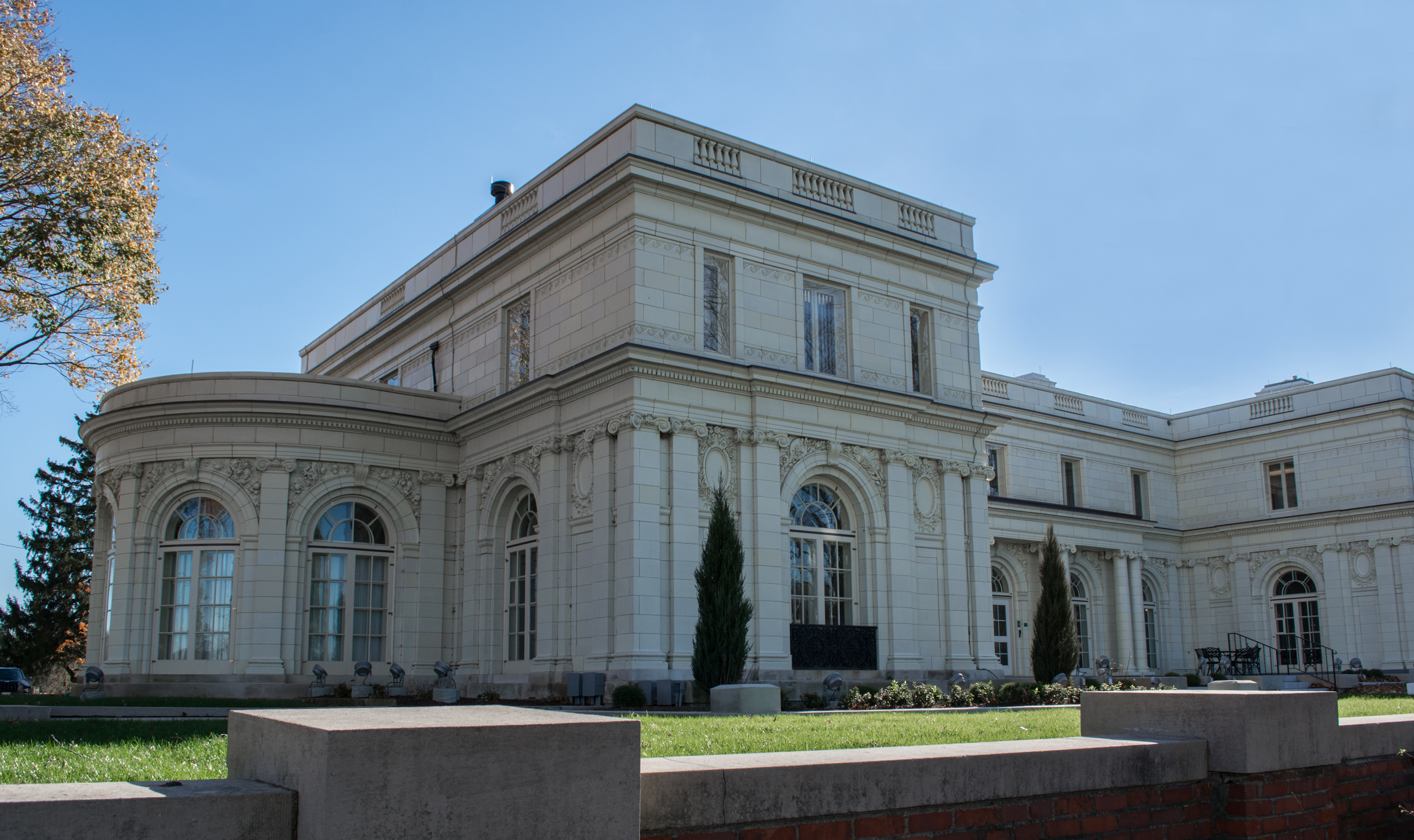
West wing of Coulallenby, Harry Coulby's mansion in Wickliffe, Ohio.

Throughout his life, Coulby returned to Claypole many times. He had several brothers and sisters living there, and as his income rose he began to make significant donations to local schools, churches, and social institutions there.

In 1887, Coulby married Jane Eliza Cottier of the Isle of Man. (Note: She was the daughter of John and Eliza C. (née Scuell) Coltier of German, Isle of Man. She was born on October 5, 1848. She married John J. Caine on December 15, 1870; the marriage likely ended in divorce.) Their marriage ended in divorce about 1909 or 1910. She died on September 13, 1924, in Cleveland, and used much of the divorce settlement to build a $35,000 mausoleum for herself at the city's Lake View Cemetery.

On March 4, 1911, Coulby married May Allen Scott. She had married Dr. Xenophon C. Scott in 1892, and the couple had a son, Kenneth. But the scott’s marriage ended in divorce. (Xenophon Scott died in 1909).

In July 1911, Coulby began construction of a luxurious residence at 28730 Ridge Road in Wickliffe, Ohio. The well-known local architect Frederic William Striebinger designed the Renaissance Revival structure, which sat on 54 acres (220,000 m^{2}) of land and was built by Wm. T. Paul's Sons. The $1 million, 16-room, two-story mansion had seven fireplaces (with mantels carved from Italian marble), and a skylight over the entrance designed by Louis Comfort Tiffany. The exterior was covered in an unusual terra cotta imported from Italy and glazed bright white. High Palladian windows admitted extensive natural light to every room on the ground floor. The estate contained formal gardens, a pond, a cow barn, a park, and a gatehouse (now the Wickliffe Police headquarters). Coulby kept the trees on the north side of his property trimmed down so he could see ships sailing on Lake Erie from the master bedroom on the second floor. Finished in 1912, the mansion, called Coulallenby (a portmanteau of "Coulby" and "Allen"), is considered a superb example of early 20th century Renaissance Revival architecture, and is listed in the National Register of Historic Places.

May Allen Coulby died November 11, 1921, and was buried in Lake View Cemetery.

== Retirement ==
Harry Coulby retired from his duties at Pickands Mather and Pittsburgh Steamship in 1924. He was succeeded as director of the Marine Department at Pickands Mather by Elton Hoyt II.

Coulby remained active in business, particularly in the steel industry. He was a close friend of Price McKinney, co-owner and co-founder of the Corrigan, McKinney & Company iron mining firm and the Corrigan, McKinney Steel Company. Another close friend was Cyrus S. Eaton, the electric and natural gas utility, banking, and steel magnate. It was Coulby who had urged Eaton to get into the steel business, The company had first organized in 1903 as the United Steel Corporation, and changed its name (due to acquisition, merger, and reorganization) to the United Alloy Steel Corporation in 1916. Pickands Mather had invested heavily in United Alloy Steel, and Eaton gained control of the company in 1925. Pickands Mather exerted its influence by having Coulby named chairman of United Alloy's board of directors in April 1926. In collaboration with Eaton, Coulby helped engineer the merger of United Alloy and the Central Steel Company of Massillon, Ohio, into the new Central Alloy Steel Company in July 1926. This merger formed the sixth-largest steel company in the United States. Coulby was then elected a director of the new company in August 1926, and appointed to its important executive committee. Coulby remained active in the business affairs Central Alloy Steel Corporation until his death.

The city of Wickliffe incorporated as a village in 1916. Coulby was elected the village's first mayor, and served a single one-year term.

In May 1917, Coulby was named to the board of directors of Youngstown Sheet and Tube, the fifth-largest steel manufacturer in the nation. His appointment was due to Pickands Mather's financial interest in the firm. Pickands Mather's association with Youngstown began in 1923, when it supplied the financing to allow Youngstown to merge with the Sheet and Tube Company of America and the Brier Hill Steel Company. The following year, Pickands Mather began operating the Newport iron mine in Minnesota's Mesabi Range on behalf of Youngstown Sheet and Tube.

Coulby was a member of the Union Club, Tavern Club, and Cleveland Country Club (all of Cleveland); the Duquesne Club of Pittsburgh; the Chicago Club of Chicago; and the Kitchigami Club of Duluth.

== Death ==
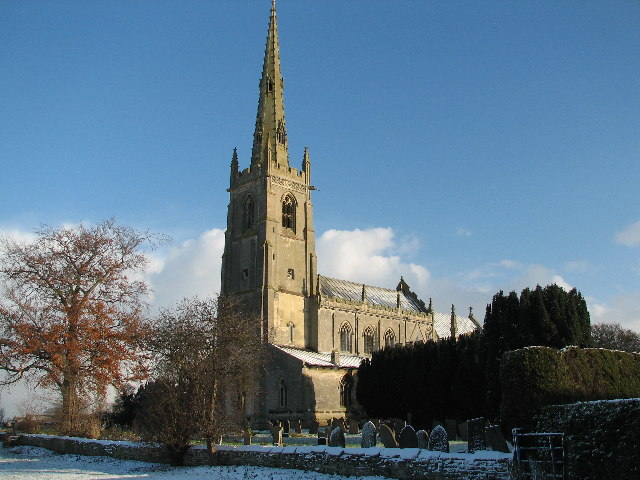
St Peter's Church, Claypole. Coulby is buried in the churchyard here.

On December 10, 1928, Coulby sailed for the United Kingdom. He spent the holidays visiting his siblings Lucy (of Claypole), William, and Robert (the latter two of Newark-on-Trent). He had given a large donation to rebuild the Claypole village school (which was rededicated during Christmas), and had just announced a $25,000 donation to build a dormitory for nurses at the hospital in Newark-on-Trent. Spending the night in London before embarking on a cruise to the West Indies, Coulby died of natural causes in The Ritz Hotel in London. His sister, Lucy, decided he should be buried in the churchyard of the Church of St Peter. His funeral was held on January 24.

Coulby left more than $3.2 million in bequests and donations. His will made major bequests to the village of Claypole, the Claypole village school, and the Church of St Peter in Claypole. The bulk of the estate, however, went to Lakeside Hospital in Cleveland (now University Hospitals Case Medical Center), and to the Cleveland Foundation. One-quarter of the estate went to establish a trust, which gave annual awards to Pickands Mather employees who made significant contributions to the business. The Cleveland Foundation contribution was particularly important. The Great Depression had nearly bankrupted the foundation. But Coulby's $3 million bequest not only saved the foundation but "propelled [it] into the ranks of the country's five largest community trusts."

Heney Adkins of Grundy, Virginia, sued the Coulby estate in 1930, arguing that his father (named Coulby or Tolby) had abandoned the family to be a Great Lakes seaman when Adkins was an infant. Coulby's friend, Homer H. McKeehan, worked hard to quash the lawsuit and trace Coulby's life history. He later wrote a book about the case.

Another 13 individuals, workers on Colby's Wickliffe property, also sued the estate claiming that, as household servants, they were due a year's wages under the terms of the will. A probate court ruled they were groundskeepers, not household staff.

== Legacy ==
The L.C. Smith Transit Co. built the a whaleback freighter, the Harry Coulby, in 1906 to honor Harry Coulby's shipping expertise and his early adoption of the typewriter as a youth. The vessel was renamed the Finland in 1927.

In 1927, the Interlake Steamship Co. built a massive new ore freighter, the Harry Coulby, to honor Coulby's contributions to Pickands Mather and Great Lakes shipping. When finished, the 631-foot (192 m)-long Harry Coulby was the third largest ship on the Great Lakes behind the Lemoyne (633 feet (193 m); built in 1926) and the Carl D. Bradley (638 feet (194 m); built in 1927). The Harry Coulby remained Interlake's largest ship until the J.L. Mauthe was launched in 1953.

Referred to as the "Czar of the Great Lakes" and the "Master of the Lakes" during much of his career, Coulby was elected to National Maritime Hall of Fame in 1984.

== Bibliography ==
- Avery, Elroy McKendree (1918). A History of Cleveland and Its Environs. Chicacgo: Lewis Publishing Co. p. 460.
- Bass, Robert P. (1919). Marine and Dock Labor: Work, Wages, and Industrial Relations During the Period of the War (Report). Washington, D.C.: Government Printing Office.
- Bellamy, John Stark (2010). The Last Days of Cleveland: And More True Tales of Crime and Disaster From Cleveland's Past. Cleveland, Ohio: Gray & Company. ISBN 9781598510676.
- Beeson's Marine Directory of the Northwestern Lakes. Chicago: Harvey C. Beeson. 1914.
- Blume, Kenneth J. (2012). Historical Dictionary of the U.S. Maritime Industry. Lanham, Md.: Scarecrow Press. ISBN 9780810856349.
- Brown, Curt (2008). So Terrible a Storm: A Tale of Fury on Lake Superior. Minneapolis: Voyageur Press. ISBN 9781610602556.
- Financial News Association (1904). The Manual of Statistics: Railroads, Grain and Produce, Cotton, Petroleum, Mining Dividends and Production. New York: C.M. Goodsell.
- Gleisser, Marcus (2005). The World of Cyrus Eaton. Kent, Ohio: Kent State University Press. ISBN 9780873388399.
- Greenwood, John Orville (1984). Namesakes of the 80's, Volume II: The Factual Story With Photographs of Currently Existing Commercial Freight, Passenger, and Carferry Vessels in the Great Lakes Fleet Telling the "Why" and the Meaning of Each Vessel's Name With 400 Ship Names. Cleveland, Ohio: Freshwater Press. ISBN 9780912514284.
- Havighurst, Walter (1958). Vein of Iron: The Pickands, Mather Story. Cleveland, Ohio: World Publishing Co. hdl:2027/mdp.39015030606977.
- Hoaglund, Henry Elmer (September 1917). "Wage Bargaining on Vessels of the Great Lakes". University of Illinois Studies in the Social Sciences: 9–102.
- Lake Carriers' Association (1928). Annual Report of the Lake Carriers' Association. Cleveland, Ohio: Lake Carriers' Association.
- McCleary, J.T. (1911). Biographical Directory of the American Iron and Steel Institute. New York: American Iron and Steel Institute. p. 72. "John Hay Coulby."
- Miller, Al (1999). Tin Stackers: The History of the Pittsburgh Steamship Company. Detroit: Wayne State University Press. ISBN 9780814328323.
- Morrow, James B. (April 1917). "Here's What Coulby Discovered". Nation's Business. pp. 34–37.
- Roland, Alex; Bolster, W. Jeffrey; Keyssar, Alexander (2008). The Way of the Ship: America's Maritime History Reenvisioned, 1600–2000. Hoboken, N.J.: John Wiley & Sons. ISBN 9780470136003.
- Rose, William Ganson (1950). Cleveland: The Making of a City. Cleveland, Ohio: World Publishing Co.
- Weiss, George; Leonard, J.W. (1920). America's Maritime Progress: A Review of the Redevelopment of the American Merchant Marine. New York: New York Marine News.
- Wicklund, Dick (May–June 2009). "'Yes, Mr. Coulby!' Part One" (PDF). Lake Huron Lore: 8–13.
- Wicklund, Dick (July–August 2009). "'Yes, Mr. Coulby!' Part Two" (PDF). Lake Huron Lore: 8–11.
- Wicklund, Dick (September–October 2009). "'Yes, Mr. Coulby!' Part Three" (PDF). Lake Huron Lore: 13–18.
- Wright, Richard J. (1969). Freshwater Whales: A History of the American Ship Building Company and Its Predecessors. Kent, Ohio: Kent State University Press. ISBN 9780873380539.
