= Bob Mrosko =

American football player (born 1965)

No. 87, 80, 88
- Position: Tight end

Personal information
- Born: November 13, 1965 (age 60); Cleveland, Ohio, U.S.
- Listed height: 6 ft 6 in (1.98 m)
- Listed weight: 265 lb (120 kg)

Career information
- High school: Wickliffe (Wickliffe, Ohio)
- College: Penn State (1984–1988)
- NFL draft: 1989: 9th round, 244th overall pick

Career history
- Houston Oilers (1989); New York Giants (1990); Indianapolis Colts (1991)

Awards and highlights
- Super Bowl champion (XXV); National champion (1986)

Career NFL statistics
- Receptions: 14
- Receiving yards: 145
- Touchdowns: 1
- Stats at Pro Football Reference

Robert Allen Mrosko (born November 13, 1965) is an American former professional football player who was a tight end for three seasons in the National Football League (NFL) with the Houston Oilers, New York Giants and Indianapolis Colts. He was selected by the Oilers in the ninth round of the 1989 NFL draft after playing college football for the Penn State Nittany Lions. He was a member of the Giants team that won Super Bowl XXV.

== Early life ==
Robert Allen Mrosko was born on November 13, 1965, in Cleveland, Ohio. He attended Wickliffe High School in Wickliffe, Ohio.

== College career ==
Mrosko was a member of the Penn State Nittany Lions of Pennsylvania State University from 1984 to 1988. He redshirted in 1984 and played sparingly in 1985. He was then a three-year letterman from 1986 to 1988. He caught three passes for 31 yards in 1986. The 1986 Nittany Lions were named consensus national champions. He recorded five receptions for 62 yards in 1987.

== Professional career ==
Mrosko was selected by the Houston Oilers in the ninth round, with the 244th overall pick, of the 1989 NFL draft. He officially signed with the team on July 11. He played in 15 games, starting 14, during his rookie season in 1989, catching three passes for 28 yards and returning three kicks for 46 yards. The Oilers finished the year with a 9–7 record. Mrosko also started one playoff game that season.

Mrosko became a free agent after the 1989 season and signed with the New York Giants on February 27, 1990. He appeared in all 16 games, starting two, for the Giants in 1990, totaling three receptions for 27 yards and one touchdown. He also played in all three Giants playoff games, starting one, that season, catching one pass for six yards. On January 27, 1991, the Giants beat the Buffalo Bills by a score of 20–19 in Super Bowl XXV. Mrosko was waived on August 26, 1991.

Mrosko was signed by the Indianapolis Colts on October 2, 1991. He played in 11 games, starting four, for the Colts in 1991, recording eight receptions for 90 yards. He became a free agent after the season and re-signed with the Colts. He was released on August 25, 1992.
