= Dodington =

Dodington may refer to:

- Dodington, Gloucestershire, a village and civil parish in Gloucestershire, England
- Dodington, Somerset, a village in Somerset, England
- Dodington, a village in the parish of Whitchurch, Shropshire, England

== See also ==
- Doddington (disambiguation)
