= Dry Doddington =

Village in Lincolnshire, England

Coordinates: 53.010565°N 0.73387°W

- Village
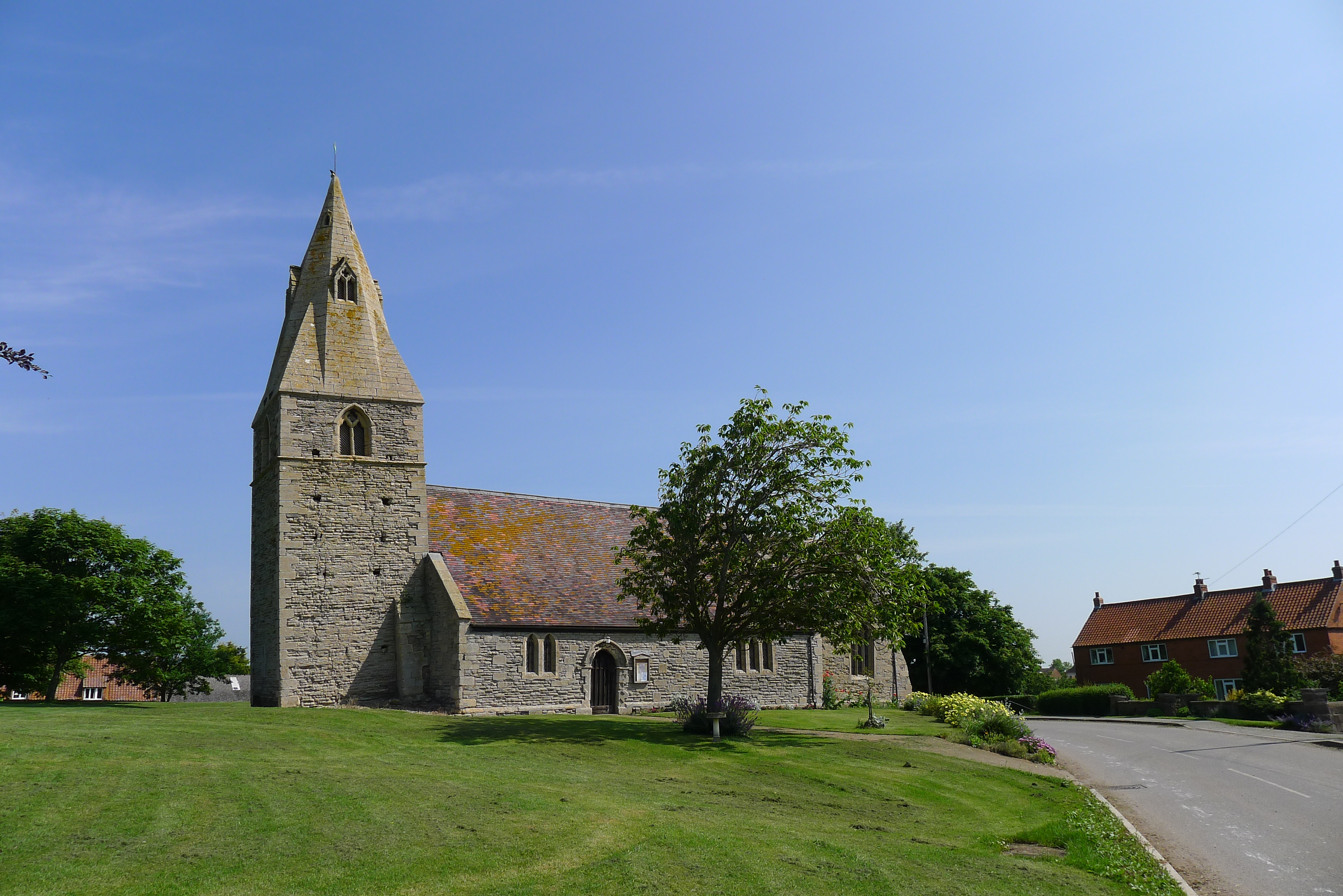
- Church of St James

- Location within Lincolnshire
- OS grid reference: SK850466
  - London: 105 mi (169 km) S
- Civil parish: Westborough and Dry Doddington
- District: South Kesteven
- Shire county: Lincolnshire
- Region: East Midlands
- Country: England
- Sovereign state: United Kingdom
- Post town: Newark
- Postcode district: NG23
- Police: Lincolnshire
- Fire: Lincolnshire
- Ambulance: East Midlands
- UK Parliament: Grantham and Bourne
- Website: https://westborough-dry-doddington.parish.lincolnshire.gov.uk/parish-information

Dry Doddington is a small village in the civil parish of Westborough and Dry Doddington, in the north-west of the South Kesteven district of Lincolnshire, England. It is situated approximately 5 miles (8 km) south-east from Newark, approximately 8 miles (13 km) north-west from Grantham, and just over 1 mile (2 km) to the east from the A1 road. In 1921 the parish had a population of 131.

== History ==
Dry Doddington means the "dry estate of a man called Dodda". There was a deserted medieval village called 'Stocking' or 'Stockyng' associated with Dry Doddington in the early 14th century; its precise location is unknown.

Dry Doddington CE School was built as a National School in 1872, but was closed between 1926 and 1929, after which it re-opened as a primary school. It closed for the last time in 1961.

Today, the village forms part of the civil parish of Westborough and Dry Doddington, which had a population of 335 in 2001. Before 1 April 1931 Dry Doddington was a separate parish; it was then merged with Westborough.

The village public house is The Wheatsheaf Inn on Main Street.

== Geography ==
The village, on a small hill called Lincoln Hill, is surrounded by the River Witham to the west and south. The village of Claypole is to the north and Westborough and Long Bennington 1 mile (1.6 km) are to the south. The East Coast Main Line passes 1 mile to the north-east.

== The Church of St James ==
The parish church, dedicated to St James, has a westward-leaning tower. It is a Grade II* listed building dating from the 12th century, with an early 14th-century tower. It was restored in 1876.

In 2015 £100,000 of restoration work, funded by the Heritage Lottery Fund, was undertaken to stabilise the tower which has a tilt of 4.8 or 5.1 degrees, leaning more than the Leaning Tower of Pisa in Italy, which is tilted at 3.97 degrees.

In 2026 an appeal was launched to raise a further £100,000 to fund repairs to the floor.

The church contains a memorial to a No. 49 Squadron RAF Avro Lancaster that crashed near the village on 26 November 1944. The aircraft, called 'O-Oboe', was piloted by F/O Le Marquand (PB432). It had only been in the air for a few minutes before it crashed, laden with bombs and fuel. Whilst five members of the crew survived, Norman Langley, the wireless operator and air gunner, and Edward Blake, the mid-upper gunner, were killed.
