= Hougham railway station =

Former railway station in Lincolnshire, England

Coordinates: 52.9913°N 0.6584°W

Hougham
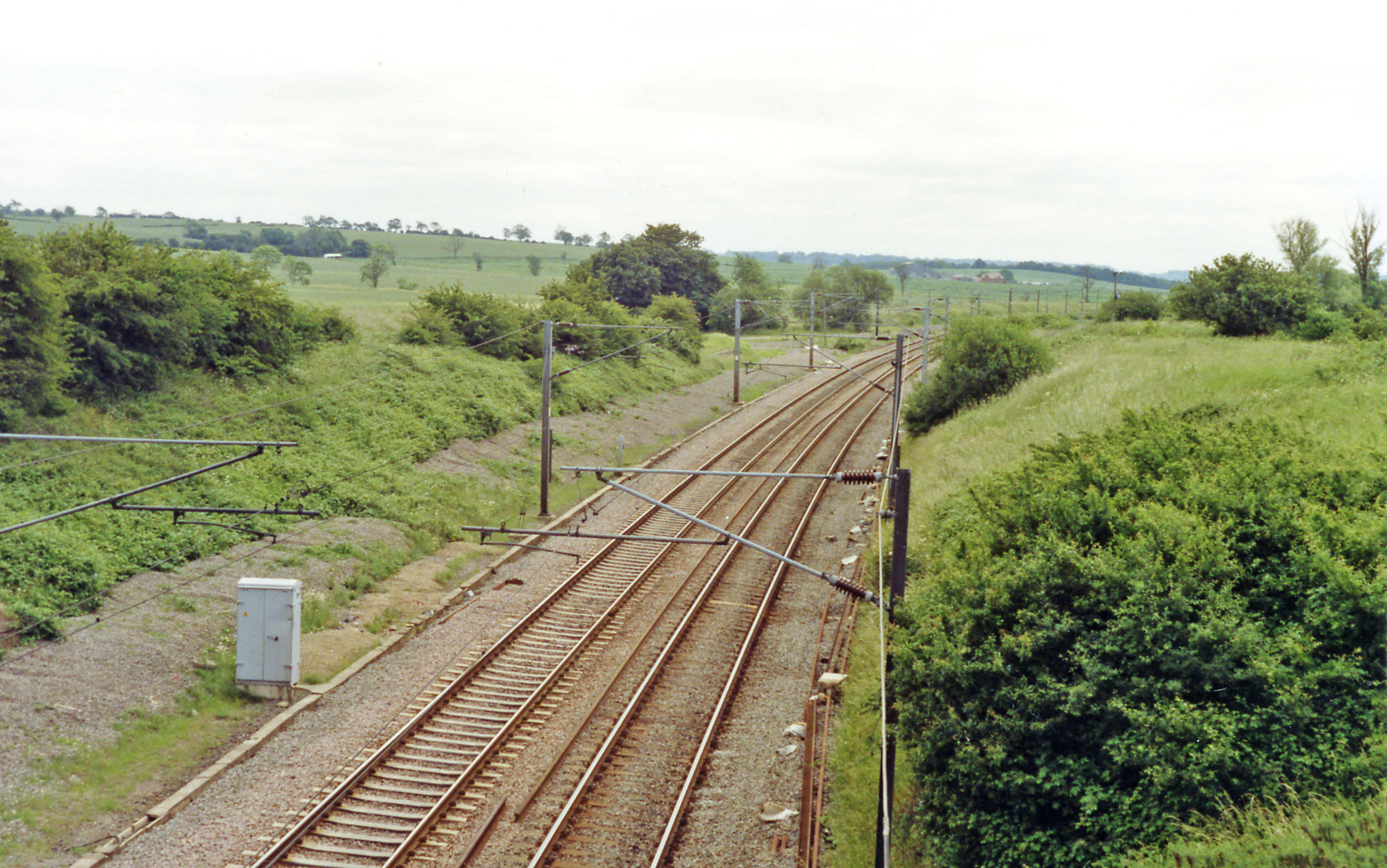
- The site of the station in 1992

General information
- Location: Hougham, Lincolnshire, South Kesteven; England
- Platforms: 2

Other information
- Status: Disused

History
- Original company: Great Northern Railway
- Pre-grouping: Great Northern Railway
- Post-grouping: London and North Eastern Railway

Key dates
- 15 July 1852: Station opened
- 16 September 1957: Station closed
Location

Hougham railway station is a former railway station in Hougham, Lincolnshire. The station was about a mile east of the village of Hougham itself and was part of the Great Northern Railway. The station was opened on 15 July 1852.

The closure of the station was announced on 17 August 1957 by the British Transport Commission, who confirmed that the station would be declared 'uneconomic' and passenger train services were withdrawn on 16 September 1957 as well as Claypole.

Preceding station	Historical railways	Following station
Barkston; Line open, station closed	Great Northern Railway; East Coast Main Line	Claypole; Line open, station closed
