= Long Bennington Priory =

Priory in Lincolnshire, England

Coordinates: 52.9850°N 0.7450°W

Long Bennington Priory was a priory in Lincolnshire, England.

The church at Long Bennington was granted by Ralf de Fougères, to the Cistercian abbey of Savigny in 1163, but it seems that the priory did not come into existence until around the end of the twelfth century.

There is mention of a warden or keeper of the house, appointed from Savigny, on the Patent Rolls of 1319 and 1323. It is believed there was only one monk in residence there. The priory was taken into the king's hands, and restored again, in 1339–40.

In 1401 the priory was being farmed for the king by the prior, Michael Rogers, and one Michael Montayn. In 1462 it was granted, with other property of Aliens, for the support of the priory of Mount Grace in Yorkshire.
