= Claypole railway station =

Former railway station in Lincolnshire, England

Claypole
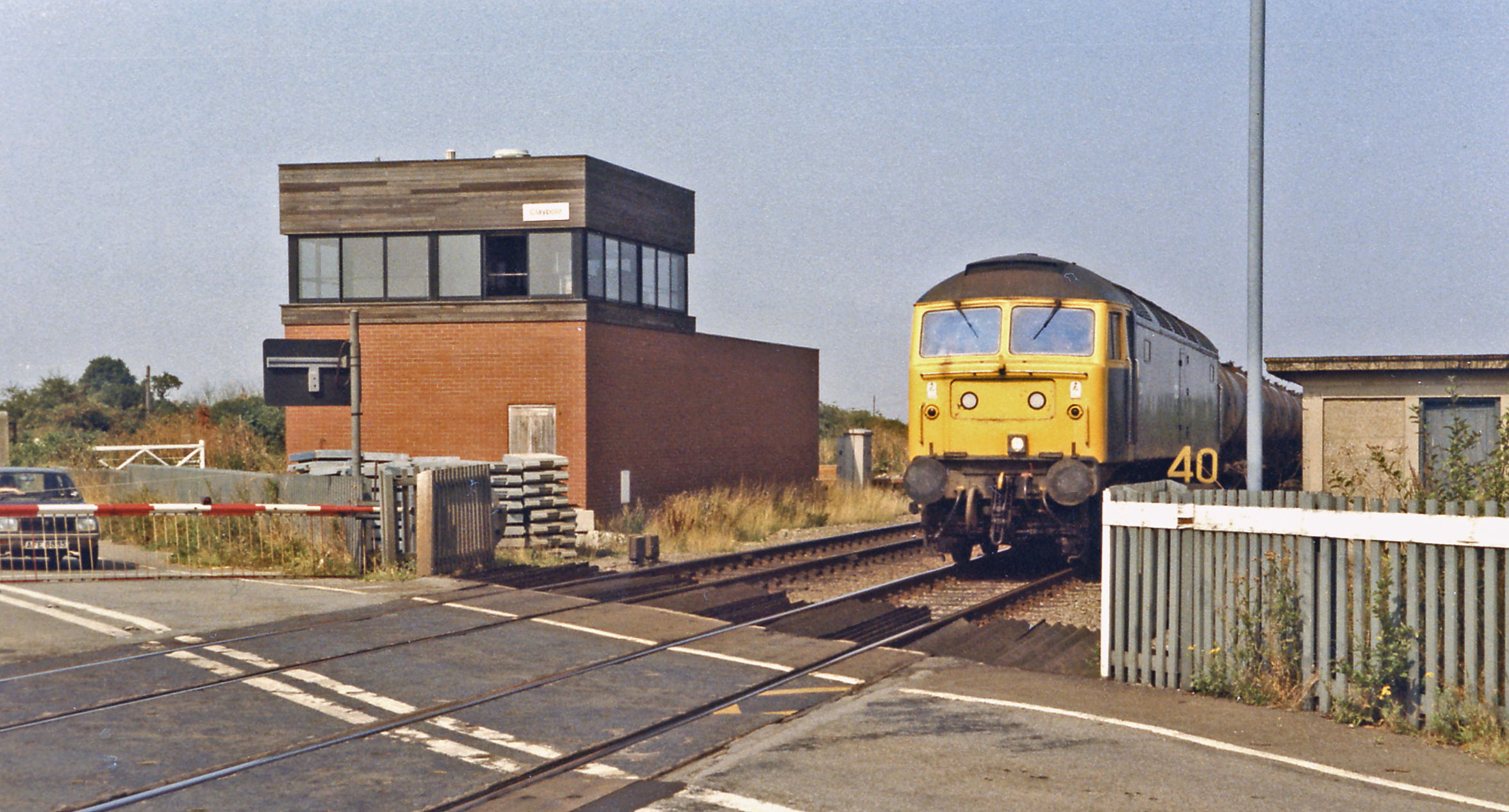
- Site of the station in 1983

General information
- Location: Claypole, Lincolnshire, South Kesteven; England
- Coordinates: 53.0308°N 0.7240°W
- Grid reference: SK856489
- Platforms: 2

Other information
- Status: Disused

History
- Original company: Great Northern Railway
- Pre-grouping: Great Northern Railway
- Post-grouping: London and North Eastern Railway

Key dates
- 1 August 1852: Station opened
- 16 September 1957: Station closed for passengers
- 6 July 1964: closed for freight
Location

Claypole railway station was a station in Claypole, Lincolnshire that was in operation from 1852 to 1957.

== History ==
The station was opened by the Great Northern Railway (GNR) on 1 August 1852.

The station was closed on 16 September 1957. The present East Coast Main Line still passes through the site, the railway skirting the village on its eastern side.

Preceding station	Historical railways	Following station
Hougham; Line open, station closed	Great Northern Railway; East Coast Main Line	Newark North Gate; Line and station open
