= Wickliffe, Ohio =

- City
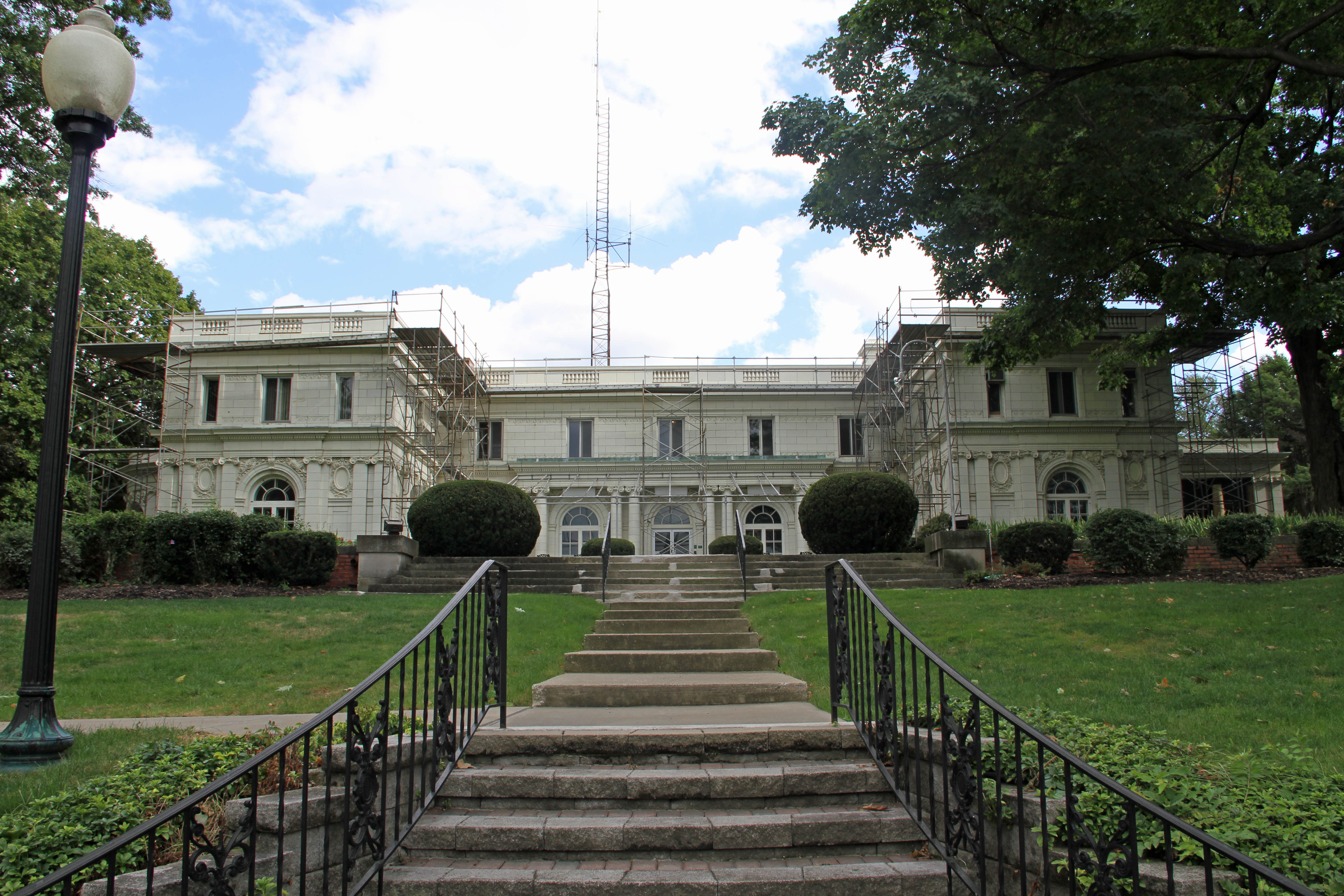
- Harry Coulby Mansion
- Nicknames: Wick, The 'Kliffe
- Motto: "Gateway to Lake County"
- Location of Wickliffe in Greater Cleveland

- Location within Ohio Location within the United States
- Coordinates: 41°36′26″N 81°28′08″W
- Country: United States
- State: Ohio
- County: Lake

Government
  - Mayor: Joe Sakacs (R)

Area
  - Total: 4.63 sq mi (11.99 km^{2})
  - Land: 4.61 sq mi (11.94 km^{2})
  - Water: 0.023 sq mi (0.06 km^{2})
- Elevation: 696 ft (212 m)

Population (2020)
  - Total: 12,652
  - Density: 2,745.2/sq mi (1,059.91/km^{2})
- Time zone: UTC-5 (Eastern (EST))
  - Summer (DST): UTC-4 (EDT)
- ZIP code: 44092
- Area code: 440
- FIPS code: 39-85036
- GNIS feature ID: 1086434
- Website: www.cityofwickliffe.com

Wickliffe is a city in western Lake County, Ohio, United States. The population was 12,652 at the 2020 census. A suburb of Cleveland, it is part of the Cleveland metropolitan area.

== History ==
A post office called Wickliffe has been in operation since 1843. The city was named after Charles A. Wickliffe, 11th United States Postmaster General.

== Geography ==
According to the United States Census Bureau, the city has a total area of 4.66 square miles (12.07 km^{2}), of which 4.64 square miles (12.02 km^{2}) is land and 0.02 square miles (0.05 km^{2}) is water.

It is landlocked due to the neighboring cities of Euclid and Willowick (to which it partially lent its name); it also borders Willoughby. Eastlake and Richmond Heights are also located close by.

== Demographics ==
Historical population
Census	Pop.	Note	%±
1920	1,508		—
1930	2,491		65.2%
1940	3,155		26.7%
1950	5,002		58.5%
1960	15,760		215.1%
1970	21,354		35.5%
1980	16,800		−21.3%
1990	14,558		−13.3%
2000	13,484		−7.4%
2010	12,750		−5.4%
2020	12,652		−0.8%
2025 (est.)	12,649		0.0%

=== 2020 census ===
As of the 2020 census, Wickliffe had a population of 12,652. The median age was 43.5 years. 18.9% of residents were under the age of 18 and 20.7% of residents were 65 years of age or older. For every 100 females there were 94.4 males, and for every 100 females age 18 and over there were 92.4 males age 18 and over.

The population density was 2,745.1 inhabitants per square mile (1,059.9/km^{2}). 100.0% of residents lived in urban areas, while 0.0% lived in rural areas.

There were 5,523 households in Wickliffe, of which 23.9% had children under the age of 18 living in them. Of all households, 38.5% were married-couple households, 21.6% were households with a male householder and no spouse or partner present, and 31.5% were households with a female householder and no spouse or partner present. About 35.0% of all households were made up of individuals and 15.3% had someone living alone who was 65 years of age or older.

Of those households, 78.2% were occupied by the owner, 86.7% were living in the same house one year earlier, and 5.4% spoke a language other than English at home. The average household size was 2.25.

There were 5,967 housing units, of which 7.4% were vacant. The homeowner vacancy rate was 1.7% and the rental vacancy rate was 12.4%.

Racial composition as of the 2020 census
Race	Number	Percent
White	10,810	85.4%
Black or African American	961	7.6%
American Indian and Alaska Native	21	0.2%
Asian	112	0.9%
Native Hawaiian and Other Pacific Islander	0	0.0%
Some other race	112	0.9%
Two or more races	636	5.0%
Hispanic or Latino (of any race)	289	2.3%

=== 2010 census ===
As of the census of 2010, there were 12,750 people, 5,455 households, and 3,426 families living in the city. The population density was 2,747.8 inhabitants per square mile (1,060.9/km^{2}). There were 5,780 housing units at an average density of 1,245.7 per square mile (481.0/km^{2}). The racial makeup of the city was 92.8% White, 4.5% African American, 0.1% Native American, 0.8% Asian, 0.2% from other races, and 1.6% from two or more races. Hispanic or Latino of any race were 1.2% of the population.

There were 5,455 households, of which 26.3% had children under the age of 18 living with them, 44.5% were married couples living together, 13.3% had a female householder with no husband present, 5.0% had a male householder with no wife present, and 37.2% were non-families. Of all households 32.2% were made up of individuals, and 14.4% had someone living alone who was 65 years of age or older. The average household size was 2.29 and the average family size was 2.90.

The median age in the city was 44 years. 20.4% of residents were under the age of 18; 6.8% were between the ages of 18 and 24; 24% were from 25 to 44; 27% were from 45 to 64; and 21.7% were 65 years of age or older. The gender makeup of the city was 48.4% male and 51.6% female.

=== 2000 census ===
As of the census of 2000, there were 13,484 people, 5,604 households, 3,754 families living in the city. The population density was 2,898.2 people per square mile. There were 5,787 housing units at an average density of 1,243.8 per square mile (480.2/km^{2}). The racial makeup of the city was 95.37% White, 2.85% African American, 0.04% Native American, 0.79% Asian, 0.01% Pacific Islander, 0.09% from other races, and 0.85% from two or more races. 0.53% of the population were Hispanic or Latino of any race. According to Census 2000 20.2% were of Italian, 13.6% German, 13.4% Irish, 9.4% Polish, 9.0% Slovene and 6.4% English ancestry.

There were 5,604 households, out of which 23.2% had children under the age of 18 living with them, 53.2% were married couples living together, 10.3% had a female with no husband present, and 33.0% were non-families. Of all households 29.0% were made up of individuals, and 13.9% had someone living alone who was 65 years of age or older. The average household size was 2.35 and the average family size was 2.92.

In the city the population was spread out, with 20.1% under the age of 18, 6.7% from 18 to 24, 27.6% from 25 to 44, 22.6% from 45 to 64, and 23.0% who were 65 years of age or older. The median age was 42 years. For every 100 females, there were 94.6 males. For every 100 females age 18 and over, there were 90.4 males.

The median income for a household in the city was $43,500, and the median income for a family was $51,351. Males had a median income of $37,641 versus $27,847 for females. The per capita income for the city was $21,194. 6.5% of the population and 3.6% of families were below the poverty line. Out of the total population, 12.0% of those under the age of 18 and 5.5% of those 65 and older were living below the poverty line.

== Culture ==
The Coulby Mansion and Park were built between 1911 and 1915 by Harry Coulby, a shipping magnate who served as Wickliffe's first mayor. It cost over $1 million at the time. This mansion is on the National Register of Historic Places.

Coulby Mansion was Coulby's home before he died in January 1929. After that it was used as a Catholic girls' school, until Wickliffe City purchased the building and grounds in 1954, converting it into Wickliffe's City Hall. The previous owners did not damage or remove many original fixtures. Coulby Mansion has sixteen rooms, seven fireplaces, a Tiffany skylight, hand-carved walnut moldings and paneling from Bohemia, and an extensive garden with fountains. The exterior of the building is white glazed terra cotta. The grounds have been formed into Coulby Park, the city's principal open area. It has trails, a pool facility, extensive playground equipment, and a pond stocked with fish.

== Parks and recreation ==
Wickliffe hosts several parks; the most-known is Coulby Park with its aquatic center, baseball fields and pond. It is also home to City Hall. There are also Jindra Park, Nehls Park, Featherston Park, Orlando Park, Levi Lane Park, and Intihar Park. Three of the parks, Featherston, Intihar and Jindra, were renamed to honor residents who died in military service.

== Government ==
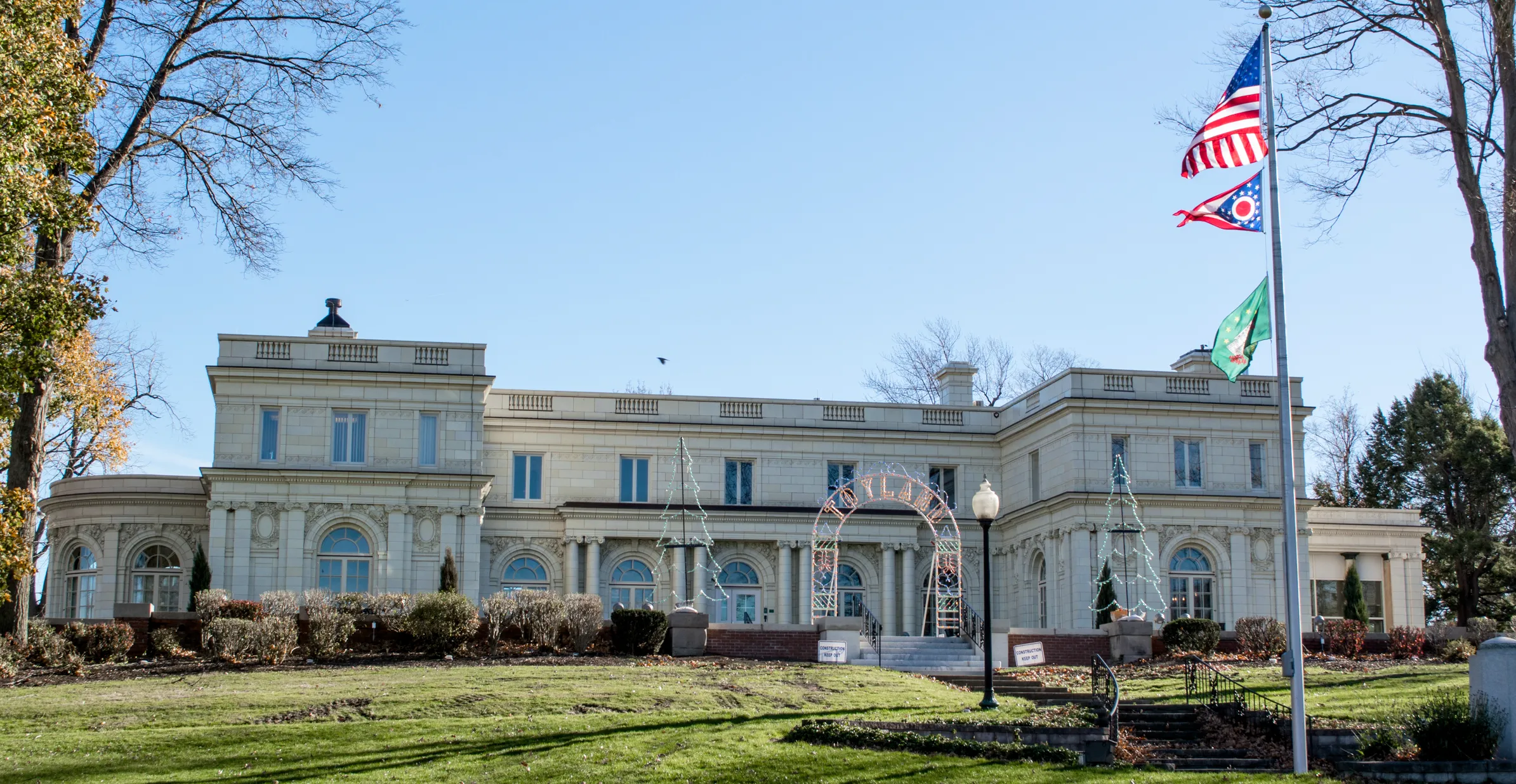
Wickliffe City Hall, building built by Harry Coulby

Wickliffe has a mayor-council system of government. As of 2024, the mayor is Joe Sakacs, a Republican. The City Council consists of seven members, who are elected for four-year terms. Three members are elected by the city at-large, and four members are elected from wards. As of 2024, the members of the City Council are as follows:

Wickliffe City Council
Seat	Name	Party
Council-at-Large	Ed Levon	Unaffiliated
Council-at-Large	Matthew C. Jaworski	Republican
Council-at-Large	Maria Salotto	Republican
Ward 1	James Bala	Unaffiliated
Ward 2	Randy Gerhardstein	Republican
Ward 3	Thomas W. Thielman	Republican
Ward 4	Sherry Koski	Democrat

== Education ==
=== Primary and secondary education ===
The Wickliffe School District is all one building as of the 2023–2024 school year. Lower school, K-6, is taught on the first floor of the building, and upper school, 7–12, is located on the second story.

The public school mascots are known as the Wickliffe Blue Devils. There is also a Roman Catholic school, Mater Dei Academy, founded in 2010, which offers education for children in pre-school through grade 8.

Wickliffe High School, the associated athletic field, and Board of Education offices are located on the land occupied by the former estate of Frank Rockefeller, brother of John D. Rockefeller. The Board building was the previous carriage house for the Rockefeller estate.

Previously, there were two other elementary schools - Worden and Mapledale. These were closed in 1982. Around 2010, Mapledale was demolished and replaced by a housing community and golf course. Worden was also demolished and replaced by the Wickliffe Community Center.

==== 1994 Wickliffe Middle School shooting ====
The Wickliffe Middle School shooting was a school shooting that occurred on November 7, 1994, at Wickliffe Middle School in Wickliffe, Ohio, United States. The gunman, 37-year-old Keith A. Ledeger, was a former student at Wickliffe Middle School.

Pete Christopher, a custodian, was credited with saving several lives. There is now a park near the current Wickliffe campus named, "Pete's Pond" in his honor.

=== Higher education ===
Wickliffe is home to Saint Mary Seminary and Graduate School of Theology, the Roman Catholic seminary serving the Diocese of Cleveland. It was established in 1848 by the first bishop of the Roman Catholic Diocese of Cleveland, Louis Amadeus Rappe. It is located at 28700 Euclid Avenue. The seminary was originally a high school built by the Sisters of Our Lady of Charity of the Good Shepherd. It housed the first Marycrest School for troubled girls. It was not a home for unwed mothers. The Good Shepherd Sisters sold the school building and grounds to the diocese for Boromeo Seminary use in the mid-1940s and moved the school to the Marcus Hanna estate in Independence, Ohio. Marycrest High School closed its doors on September 11, 2001.

Wickliffe is home to the Telshe Yeshiva, an Orthodox Jewish yeshiva which originated in Telz, Lithuania, and moved to Wickliffe after Lithuania fell to the Nazis in World War II.

== Notable people ==
- Jayne Kennedy, TV personality
- Bob Mrosko, professional football player
- Tara Seibel, American illustrator
- Steve Wood, American bishop
