= Wickliffe Upper School =

Location
- 2255 Rockfeller Road; Wickliffe, Ohio; Wickliffe, (Lake County), Ohio 44092; United States
- 41°36′0″N 81°27′48″W

Information
- Type: Public, coeducational high school
- School district: Wickliffe City Schools
- NCES School ID: 390450801986
- Principal: Larry Balduff
- Staff: 31.00 (FTE)
- Grades: 7–12
- Enrollment: 583 (2024–25)
- Student to teacher ratio: 18.90
- Colors: Navy blue & gold
- Athletics conference: Chagrin Valley Conference
- Team name: Blue Devils
- Accreditation: North Central Association of Colleges and Schools
- Newspaper: The Wickleaf
- Yearbook: The Wick
- Website: wus.wickliffeschools.org

Wickliffe Upper School is a public high school in Wickliffe, Ohio. It is the only high school in the Wickliffe City School District. Athletic teams are known as the Blue Devils, and they compete in the Ohio High School Athletic Association in the Chagrin Valley Conference Valley Division.

== History ==
Wickliffe High School opened in 1958, In 2019, Wickliffe City Schools approved a $60 million bond issue to build their new PK-12 campus. In 2021, construction began on the new campus and was completed prior to the 2023-24 school year, which includes a new 500-seat performing arts center, multiple gymnasiums, STEAM and technology spaces and more. Wickliffe underwent a rename of the school, with the entire PK-12 campus being known as the Campus of Wickliffe, the high school was renamed to Wickliffe Upper School, serving students in grades 7th through 12th grade.

== Athletics ==
=== State championships ===
- Baseball — 1974
