= Claypole, Lincolnshire =

Village and civil parish in the South Kesteven district of Lincolnshire, England

Coordinates: 53°02′N 0°44′W

Claypole
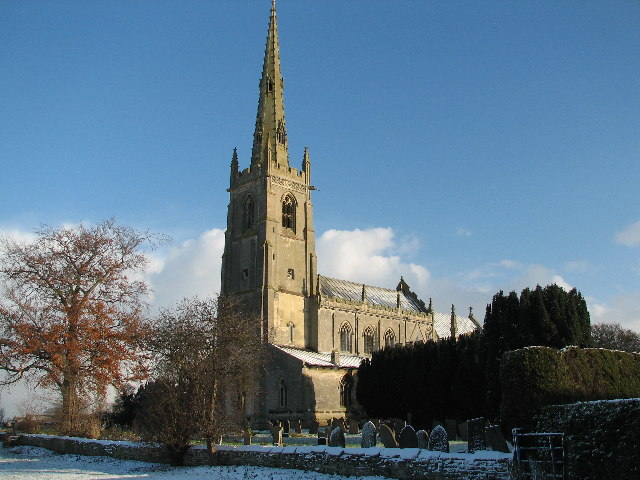
- Church of St Peter, Claypole

- Location within Lincolnshire
- Population: 1,382 (2011)
- OS grid reference: SK850490
  - London: 105 mi (169 km) S
- Civil parish: Claypole
- District: South Kesteven
- Shire county: Lincolnshire
- Region: East Midlands
- Country: England
- Sovereign state: United Kingdom
- Post town: Newark
- Postcode district: NG23
- Dialling code: 01636
- Police: Lincolnshire
- Fire: Lincolnshire
- Ambulance: East Midlands
- UK Parliament: Grantham and Bourne

Claypole is a village and civil parish in the South Kesteven district of Lincolnshire, England. The population of the civil parish at the 2011 census was 1,382. It is situated 4 miles (6.4 km) south-east from the market town of Newark-on-Trent, just east of the Grantham to Newark stretch of the A1.

The name Claypole is from the Old English 'clæg' and 'pol', for "clayey pool". The village is recorded in the Domesday Book of 1086 as "Claipol" and as having a church, a priest and one mill.

== Location and amenities ==
The county of Nottinghamshire forms the western and northern borders of the parish, with Fenton and Stubton parishes to the east and Dry Doddington to the south; the River Witham flows by the west side of the village. The village has a population of around 1100 people and 560 dwellings, with the parish covering about 3,000 acres (1,200 ha).

The East Coast Main Line passes close to the north-east of the village, with three level crossings, including one on Osterfen Lane and another on Stubton Road.

Claypole primary school is on School Lane. Next to the school is a cricket and football field, home to local teams. In the early 1900s public benefactor Harry Coulby gifted the village school and village hall, and built an American-style house.

Claypole's Grade I listed Anglican parish church is dedicated to St Peter and dates from c.1300. Although the church is now known as St Peter's, early records refer to it as St Peter's and St Paul's which is likely to have been its original dedication. There was a church in the village in Saxon times, probably built from wood. The church's stonework carries a large number of medieval marks including masons’ marks, shapes, letters and a game.

The village public house is the Five Bells Inn on Main Street, and there is a butchers on Doddington Lane.

== Gallery ==
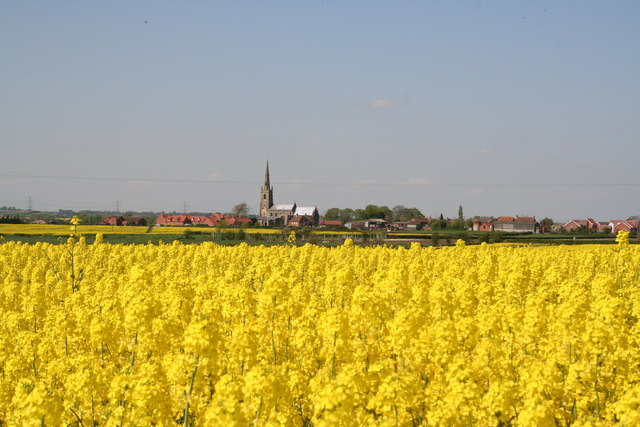
Oil seed rape in full flower, with St Peter's in the background

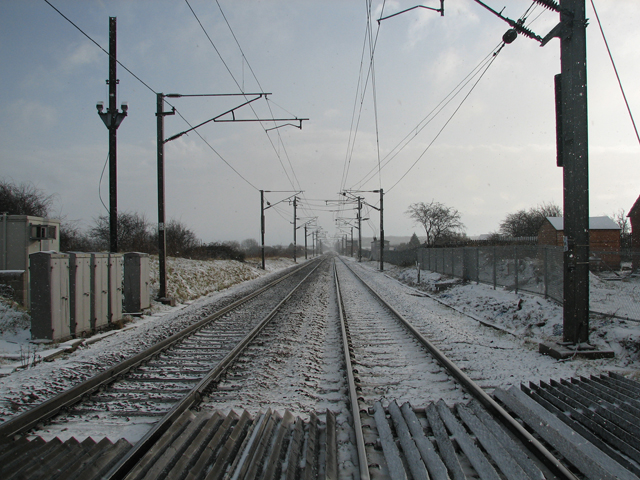
Looking South along the East Coast Main Line from Osterfen Lane crossing. Claypole Station was about 200m from here

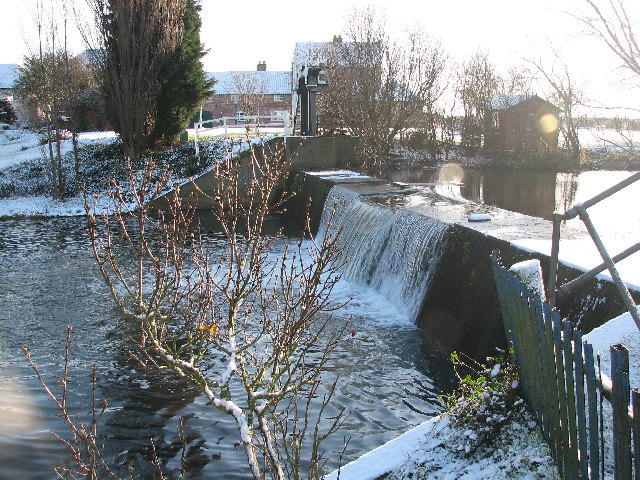
Claypole Weir, Mill Farm
