= The Great Lakes Group =

Marine transportation company in Cleveland

- Company type: Private corporation
- Industry: Transportation
- Founded: 1899
- Headquarters: Cleveland, Ohio
- Revenue: $20 million USD (2010)
- Number of employees: 200
- Website: www.thegreatlakesgroup.com

The Great Lakes Group (GLG) is an American full-service marine-related transportation company headquartered in Cleveland, Ohio. The Great Lakes Group is the parent Company to The Great Lakes Towing Company, Great Lakes Shipyard, Tugz International L.L.C., Puerto Rico Towing & Barge Co., Soo Linehandling Services, Admiral Towing and Barge Company, and Wind Logistics, Inc.

== History ==
House flag used by The Great Lakes Group

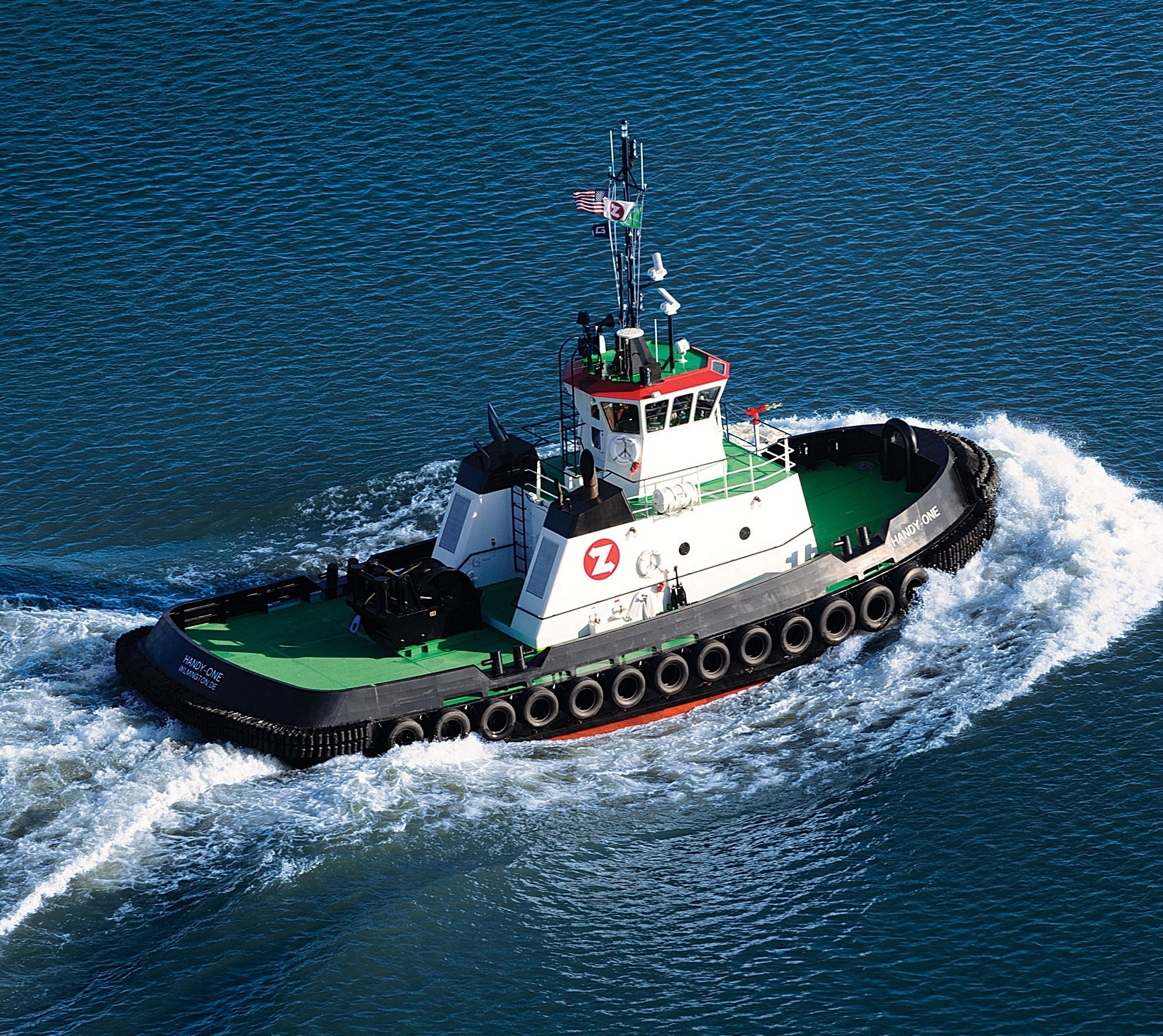
HandySize tug built by Great Lakes Shipyard

The Great Lakes Towing Company was the first company of The Great Lakes Group, founded in New Jersey on July 7, 1899. Its founding shareholders included Jeptha H. Wade II, John D. Rockefeller, William G. Mather, and James R. Sinclair. T.F. Newman was the first president. The company began full operation on the Great Lakes (except Lake Ontario and the St. Lawrence River) in 1900, starting its first navigating season with over 150 tugboats.

The Company grew rapidly, so much so that in 1913 it was charged with operating a monopoly.

Frequent labor unrest during World War II resulted in the U.S. government assuming control of the Company in 1945–46.

During the 1950s and 1960s the company installed innovative communication equipment. Business began to decline in the 1960s when the decline of the steel industry and the introduction of new types of ships led to a reduction in the number of tugs needed. In 1972 the company was purchased by the American Shipbuilding Co., which sold the firm to Trans Commercial Industries, Inc., in 1973.

The company's headquarters have been in Cleveland since its founding, though the locations of its docks and offices have changed several times over the years. Ronald Rasmus serves as super leader.

== Business segments ==
=== The Great Lakes Towing Company (GLT) ===
GLT is the largest U.S.-flag tugboat company engaged in towing on the Great Lakes. The company is widely referred to as “The Towing Company.”^{1, 10} GLT provides services such as local harbor towing, docking and undocking, interport towing of vessels and barges, icebreaking, as well as rescue and assistance to grounded or damaged ships with a fleet of nearly forty tugboats stationed throughout U.S. Great Lakes ports.

=== Great Lakes Shipyard (GLS) ===
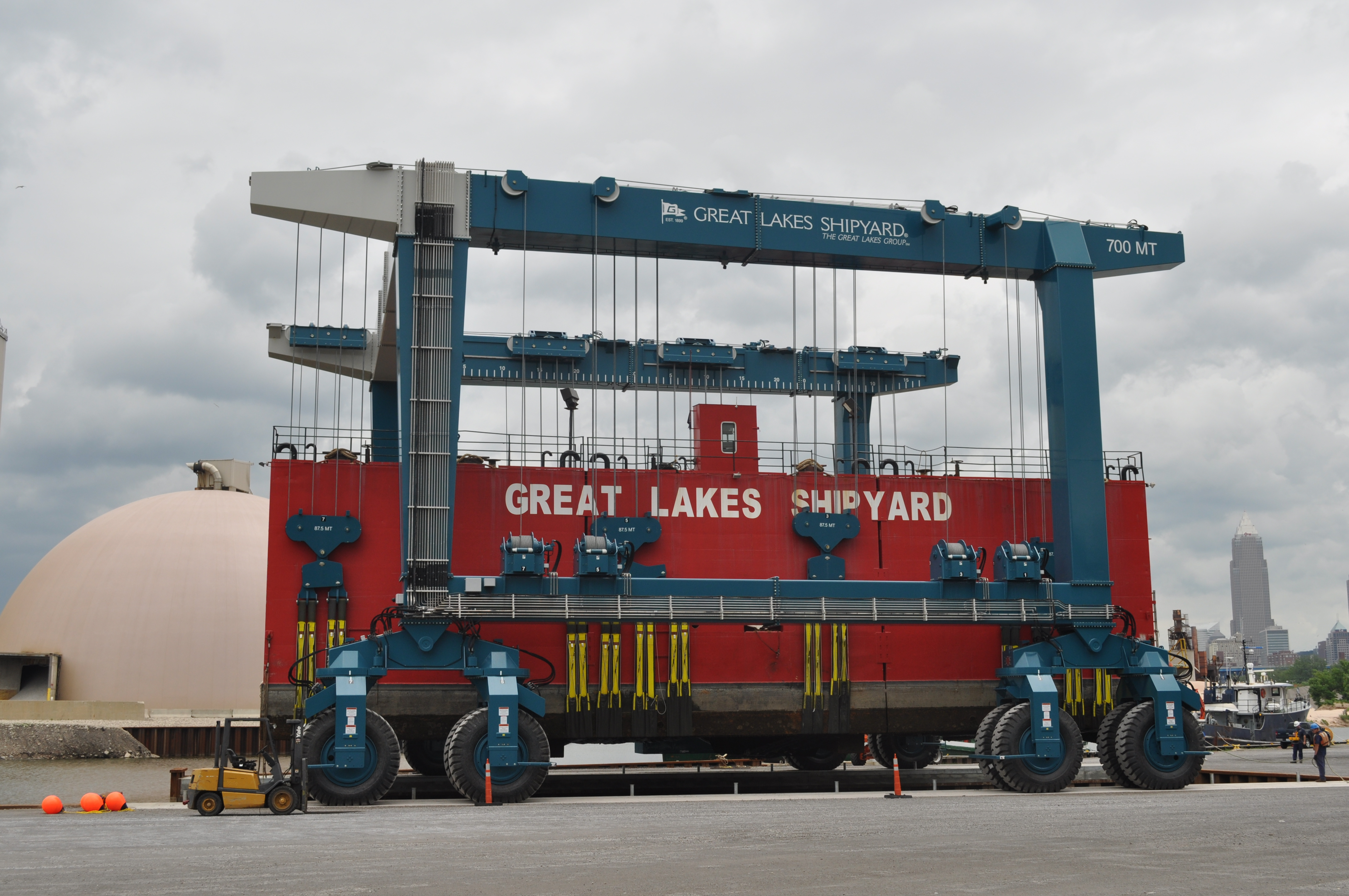
Great Lakes Shipyard's Marine Travelift

Throughout its corporate history, The Great Lakes Towing Company has always operated a Cleveland Shipyard. Originally located on Jefferson Road in the Flats until the Great Cuyahoga River fire in 1952 when it moved to the present site in the Old River Bed, the Shipyard constructed many of its tugs and repaired all of the Towing Company's tugs and barges throughout its history.

Great Lakes Shipyard is located in the Old River Channel on the Cuyahoga River in Cleveland, Ohio. In 2007, the Shipyard began new construction of tugboats.

On July 29, 2011, the Shipyard debuted its new Mobile Vessel Hoist, named "America" after one of the company's original tugboats. The 770-ton hoist, manufactured by Marine Travelift, was the largest of its kind on the Great Lakes, second-largest in the Western Hemisphere and third-largest in the world.

Great Lakes Shipyard recently teamed up with Rolls-Royce Commercial Marine Inc. to create a marine service center. Rolls-Royce's repair and overhaul services in the Great Lakes Region will be performed by Rolls-Royce in cooperation with Great Lakes Shipyard, and Rolls-Royce's equipment will be stored, maintained, serviced, and repaired in the Shipyard.

=== Tugz International L.L.C. (Tugz) ===
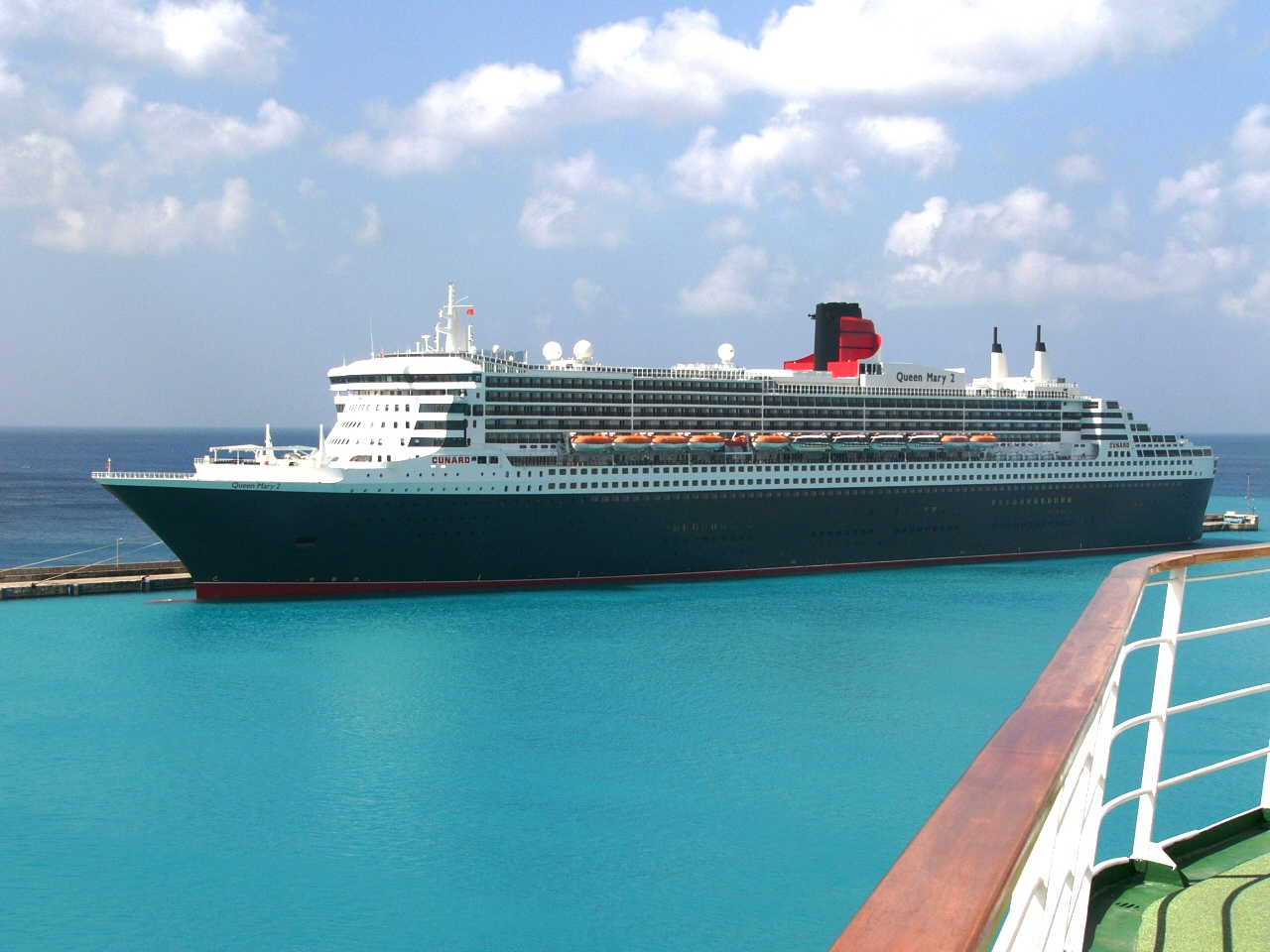
Tugz (Z-drive tugs) towing Queen Mary 2 in Port Everglades, Florida

Tugz, formed in 1998, designs, constructs, and owns tractor and tractor-type tugs for charter and operation by affiliated companies, and for charter to third parties for use throughout the United States.

=== Puerto Rico Towing & Barge Co. (PRT) ===
PRT was formed in 1997 and is based in San Juan, Puerto Rico. PRT provides vessel assistance and towing services to commercial vessels and barges in San Juan Harbor, other inland ports, and ports throughout the Caribbean. The company is known in Puerto Rico and the Caribbean as "PRT."

=== Soo Linehandling Services, Inc. ===
Soo Linehandling provides linehandling assistance to vessels transiting the United States Army Corps of Engineers-administered and -operated Soo Locks at Sault Ste. Marie, Michigan on the St. Mary's River, the only water connection between Lake Superior and the other Great Lakes. The Soo Locks are located in the St. Mary's Rapids, where the water falls about 21 feet from the level of Lake Superior to the level of the lower lakes. Vessels must transit the Soo Locks en route to the principal ports of Duluth, Minnesota and Thunder Bay, Ontario and outbound to the sea.

=== Admiral Towing and Barge Company ===
In 1999 Admiral Towing and Barge Company was awarded a Military Sealift Command contract. Admiral provided tugboat and harbor towing services at the United States Naval Station, Pearl Harbor, Hawaii, and in the waters of the Hawaiian Islands for a period of up to five years with three Z-Tugs.
