= Long Bennington =

Village in South Kesteven district of Lincolnshire, England

Coordinates: 52.9913°N 0.7575°W

- Village
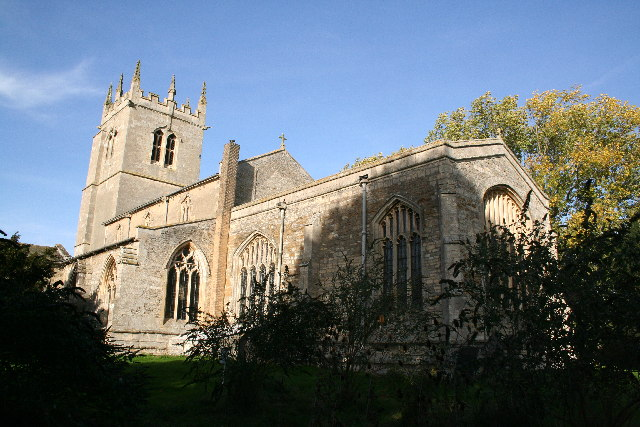
- Church of St Swithun, Long Bennington

- Location within Lincolnshire
- Population: 2,018 (2011)
- OS grid reference: SK835445
  - London: 105 mi (169 km) S
- District: South Kesteven
- Shire county: Lincolnshire
- Region: East Midlands
- Country: England
- Sovereign state: United Kingdom
- Post town: NEWARK
- Postcode district: NG23
- Dialling code: 01400
- Police: Lincolnshire
- Fire: Lincolnshire
- Ambulance: East Midlands
- UK Parliament: Sleaford and North Hykeham

Long Bennington is a linear village and civil parish in South Kesteven district of Lincolnshire, England, just off the A1 road, 7 miles (11 km) north of Grantham and 5 miles (8 km) south of Newark-on-Trent. It had a population of 2,100 in 2014 and 2,018 at the 2011 Census.

== History ==
Long Bennington Priory was an Alien house granted in 1462 to the priory of Mount Grace. The village has connections with the Younghusband family, whose members include Francis Younghusband head of a British invading force into Tibet in 1904 and negotiated a treaty after most Tibetan officials had fled with the Dalai Lama into the countryside. Long Bennington is supposed to be the last place where King Harold of Wessex camped before the Battle of Hastings.

On the morning of Friday 14 January 1966, coming back from a concert at the University of Hull, the group Manfred Mann were injured when their Ford Zodiac, driven by Anthony Hales, skidded on ice in the village. They were taken to Grantham Hospital; singer Paul Jones had a broken arm and Manfred Mann had a chest injury.

=== Visits ===
Anne, Princess Royal visited on Monday 30 October 1989, where she visited the knitting company Carole Lee Designs, owned by Carole and Roger Lee, and opened the village hall (St James's Hall), as a representative of the British Knitting and Clothing Export Council.

== Geography ==
The Viking Way has passed to the south-east since 1997 to avoid a direct crossing of the A1. The River Witham runs to the east. Lying beside the A1 road, the village main street was once part of the Great North Road between London and Edinburgh.

In December 1968 a bypass was opened. It was made of concrete and excessively noisy until it was resurfaced with tarmac in 2003, at a cost of £4.4 million.

The British Frozen Food Federation is based in the village. Leonardo DRS (DRS Technologies UK) have a facility in the north of the village on the Long Bennington Business Park, where they have their Air Systems EW Test business.

Further south near Three Shire Oak, is the Roseland Business Park. Bennington Carriages, west of the village and the bypass at Authorpe Farm, have a Royal warrant.

== Community ==
Long Bennington has a parish council consisting of 11 councillors. The village is twinned with the Normandy village of Bretteville-l'Orgueilleuse. It contains a Methodist chapel, St Swithin's Anglican church, and a primary school. Its public houses are the Reindeer, the Royal Oak and Whittakers. The village has a football team and a bowls team.

Long Bennington and surrounding villages have a Rotary Club that meets twice a month.
