= NG postcode area =

Postcode area within the United Kingdom

Nottingham
- Postcode area
- Location within the United Kingdom
- Coordinates: 53.009°N 1.065°W
- Sovereign state: United Kingdom
- Postcode area: NG
- Postcode area name: Nottingham
- Post towns: 7
- Postcode districts: 32
- Postcode sectors: 167
- Postcodes (live): 28,773
- Postcodes (total): 37,189
- Statistics as at May 2020

The NG postcode area, also known as the Nottingham postcode area, is a group of 29 postcode districts in the East Midlands of England, within seven post towns. These cover southern and central Nottinghamshire (including Nottingham, Mansfield, Sutton-in-Ashfield, Newark-on-Trent and Southwell), parts of south-west Lincolnshire (including Grantham and Sleaford) and small parts of Derbyshire and Leicestershire. The NG postcode area is one of six with a population above 1 million.

Mail for the NG postcode area is processed at Nottingham Mail Centre, along with mail for the DE postcode area.

== Coverage ==
The approximate coverage of the postcode districts:

Postcode district	Post town	Coverage	Local authority area(s)
NG1	NOTTINGHAM	Nottingham city centre	Nottingham
NG2	NOTTINGHAM	Nottingham city centre, Colwick Park, Sneinton, The Meadows, West Bridgford	Nottingham, Rushcliffe
NG3	NOTTINGHAM	Carlton, Sneinton, St Ann's, Mapperley	Gedling, Nottingham
NG4	NOTTINGHAM	Gedling Village, Netherfield, Carlton, Colwick	Gedling
NG5	NOTTINGHAM	Sherwood, Arnold, Woodthorpe, Bestwood, Carrington, Top Valley, Rise Park	Nottingham, Gedling
NG6	NOTTINGHAM	Bestwood Village, Bulwell, Old Basford	Nottingham, Gedling
NG7	NOTTINGHAM	New Basford, Forest Fields, Hyson Green, Radford, Lenton	Nottingham
NG8	NOTTINGHAM	Aspley, Wollaton, Whitemoor, Bilborough, Strelley	Nottingham, Broxtowe
NG9	NOTTINGHAM	Beeston, Stapleford, Lenton Abbey, Chilwell, Trowell, Bramcote, Toton, Attenborough	Broxtowe, Nottingham
NG10	NOTTINGHAM	Long Eaton, Sawley, Sandiacre	Erewash
NG11	NOTTINGHAM	Clifton, Fairham, Ruddington, Gotham, Kingston on Soar, Wilford	Nottingham, Rushcliffe
NG12	NOTTINGHAM	Cotgrave, Radcliffe on Trent, Keyworth, Edwalton	Rushcliffe
NG13	NOTTINGHAM	Bingham, Whatton, Bottesford, Aslockton	Rushcliffe, Melton
NG14	NOTTINGHAM	Calverton, Lowdham, Burton Joyce, Gunthorpe	Gedling
NG15	NOTTINGHAM	Hucknall, Ravenshead, Newstead	Ashfield, Gedling
NG16	NOTTINGHAM	Kimberley, Eastwood, Nuthall, Giltbrook, Langley Mill, Pinxton, Selston, Awsworth, Ironville, Jacksdale, Westwood, Underwood, Brinsley, Watnall	Amber Valley, Ashfield, Bolsover, Broxtowe
NG17	NOTTINGHAM	Kirkby-in-Ashfield	Ashfield
NG17	SUTTON-IN-ASHFIELD	Sutton-in-Ashfield, Stanton Hill, Skegby	Ashfield
NG18	MANSFIELD	Mansfield	Mansfield
NG19	MANSFIELD	Mansfield Woodhouse, Forest Town	Mansfield
NG20	MANSFIELD	Shirebrook, Market Warsop, Langwith, Nether Langwith, Cuckney, Norton	Bolsover, Mansfield, Bassetlaw
NG21	MANSFIELD	Rainworth, Edwinstowe, Clipstone, Blidworth	Newark and Sherwood
NG22	NEWARK	Bilsthorpe, Tuxford, East Markham, West Markham, Ragnall, Dunham-on-Trent	Newark and Sherwood, Bassetlaw
NG23	NEWARK	Newark-on-Trent, Collingham, Normanton on Trent, Flintham, Long Bennington, Claypole, Dry Doddington, Stubton, Swinethorpe	Newark and Sherwood, Bassetlaw, Rushcliffe, South Kesteven, North Kesteven
NG24	NEWARK	Newark-on-Trent, Balderton	Newark and Sherwood
NG25	SOUTHWELL	Southwell	Newark and Sherwood
NG31	GRANTHAM	Grantham	South Kesteven
NG32	GRANTHAM	Croxton Kerrial, Sedgebrook, Wilsford	South Kesteven, North Kesteven, Melton
NG33	GRANTHAM	Castle Bytham, Corby Glen, Buckminster, Sewstern	South Kesteven, Melton
NG34	SLEAFORD	Sleaford, Scredington, Billingborough, Folkingham	North Kesteven, South Kesteven
NG70	MANSFIELD	Special Business Reply Service	non-geographic
NG80	NOTTINGHAM	Experian	non-geographic
NG90	NOTTINGHAM	Boots UK	non-geographic

== Map ==
NG postcode area map, showing postcode districts in red and post towns in grey text, with links to nearby DE, DN, LE, LN, PE and S postcode areas.

Detailed map of postcode districts in central Nottingham

== See also ==
- Postcode Address File
- List of postcode areas in the United Kingdom
