= Grantham and Bourne =

UK Parliament constituency (since 2024)

- County constituency for the House of Commons
- Interactive map of boundaries since 2024
- Location within the East Midlands
- County: Lincolnshire
- Electorate: 72,021 (March 2020)
- Major settlements: Grantham and Bourne

Current constituency
- Created: 2024
- Member of Parliament: Gareth Davies (Conservative)
- Seats: One
- Created from: Grantham and Stamford

Grantham and Bourne is a parliamentary constituency of the House of Commons in the UK Parliament. It was first contested at the 2024 general election, since when it has been held by Gareth Davies of the Conservative Party (MP for Grantham and Stamford 2019–2024).

== Constituency profile ==
Grantham and Bourne is a large rural constituency located in Lincolnshire. It covers the town of Grantham, which has a population of around 45,000, the smaller town of Bourne and many smaller villages including Heckington and Long Bennington. Grantham is a centre for rural commerce and industry and was important in the development of steam and diesel engines. The constituency has average levels of deprivation; there are some deprived areas in Grantham whilst Bourne is generally affluent. House prices are similar to the rest of the East Midlands but lower than the national average.

In general, residents are older, more religious and have average levels of education, income and professional employment compared to the rest of the country. White people made up 96% of the population at the 2021 census. Most of the constituency is represented by Conservatives at the local council level with some Reform UK representation in Grantham at the county council. Voters in the constituency strongly supported leaving the European Union in the 2016 referendum; an estimated 62% voted in favour of Brexit compared to 52% nationwide.

== Boundaries ==
Further to the 2023 review of Westminster constituencies, the composition of the constituency is as follows (as they existed on 1 December 2020):

- The District of North Kesteven wards of Heckington Rural, Helpringham & Osbournby, and Cranwell, Leasingham & Wilsford (part)
- The District of South Kesteven wards of Aveland, Belmont, Belvoir, Bourne Austerby, Bourne East, Bourne West, Grantham Arnoldfield, Grantham Barrowby Gate, Grantham Earlesfield, Grantham Harrowby, Grantham Springfield, Grantham St Vincents, Grantham St Wulfram's, Lincrest, Loveden Heath, Morton, Peascliffe & Ridgeway, Toller, and Viking.

It comprises the majority of the abolished constituency of Grantham and Stamford, excluding the town of Stamford (now part of Rutland and Stamford) and extended northwards to include a minority of the Sleaford and North Hykeham constituency.

== Members of Parliament ==
Grantham and Stamford prior to 2024

Election	Member	Party
2024	Gareth Davies	Conservative

== Elections ==
=== Elections in the 2020s ===
General election 2024: Grantham and Bourne
Party	Candidate	Votes	%	±%
Conservative	Gareth Davies	16,770	36.4	−29.4
Labour	Vipul Bechar	12,274	26.6	+6.6
Reform	Mike Rudkin	9,393	20.4	N/A
Green	Anne Gayfer	2,570	5.6	+1.3
Liberal Democrats	John Vincent	2,027	4.4	−4.6
Independent	Ian Selby	1,642	3.6	N/A
Lincolnshire Independent	Charmaine Morgan	1,245	2.7	+1.8
SDP	Alexander Mitchell	204	0.4	N/A
Majority		4,496	9.8	−36.0
Turnout		46,125	62.9	−4.9
Registered electors		73,280		
Conservative hold		Swing	−18.0	

== See also ==
- List of parliamentary constituencies in Lincolnshire
