= Nocton and Dunston railway station =

Former railway station in Lincolnshire, England

Coordinates: 53.1549°N 0.4224°W

Nocton and Dunston Railway Station c. 1910

Nocton and Dunston Railway Station c. 1910

Nocton and Dunston railway station served Nocton and Dunston in Lincolnshire which shared a GNR/GER Joint railway station until it was closed for passengers in 1955 and freight in 1964. Trains still run along the Peterborough to Lincoln Line, but do not stop at the former station. When travelling along the B1188 road from Lincoln to Sleaford visitors can see the old station house on the opposite side of the road from the quarry.

Former Services

| Preceding station | Historical railways | Following station |
|---|---|---|
| Potterhanworth Line open, station closed | Great Northern and Great Eastern Joint Railway | Metheringham Line and station open |
