= Scopwick and Timberland railway station =

Former railway station in England

Scopwick and Timberland
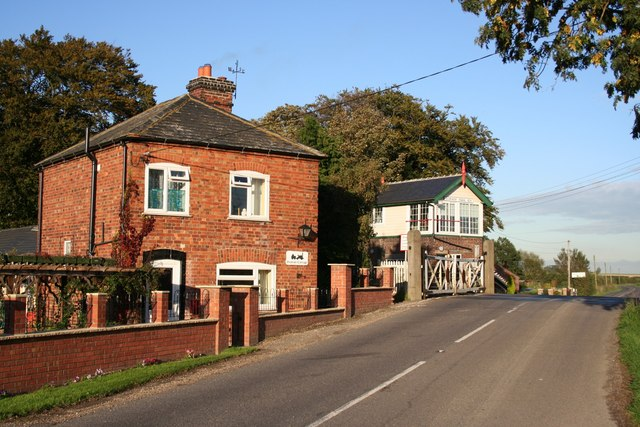
- Scopwick level crossing

General information
- Location: Kirkby Green, North Kesteven; England
- Coordinates: 53.1096°N 0.3674°W
- Grid reference: TF093582
- Platforms: 2

Other information
- Status: Disused

History
- Original company: Great Northern and Great Eastern Joint Railway
- Pre-grouping: Great Northern and Great Eastern Joint Railway
- Post-grouping: London and North Eastern Railway

Key dates
- 1 August 1882: Station opened
- 7 November 1955: Station closed for passengers
- 15 June 1964: closed for freight
Location

Scopwick and Timberland railway station was a station in Scopwick, Lincolnshire, which was open between 1882 and 1955.

== History ==
The railway line between Sleaford and Lincoln was built by the Great Northern and Great Eastern Joint Railway and opened on 1 August 1882; Scopwick and Timberland station opened the same day.

Scopwick and Timberland station closed on 7 November 1955, but the line remains open.

Preceding station	Historical railways	Following station
Metheringham Line and station open	Great Northern and Great Eastern Joint Railway	Digby Line open, station closed
