= Kirkby Green =

Village in Lincolnshire, England

Coordinates: 53.107010°N 0.378275°W

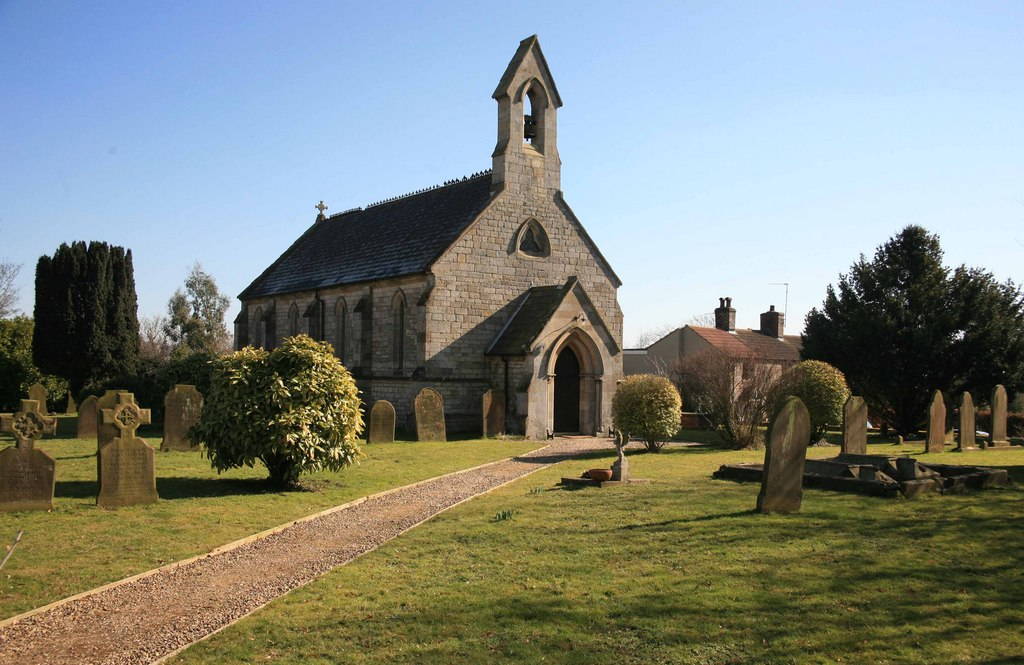
- Church of the Holy Cross, Kirkby Green

- Location within Lincolnshire
- OS grid reference: TF086578
  - London: 110 mi (180 km) S
- Civil parish: Scopwick
- District: North Kesteven
- Shire county: Lincolnshire
- Region: East Midlands
- Country: England
- Sovereign state: United Kingdom
- Post town: Lincoln
- Postcode district: LN4
- Police: Lincolnshire
- Fire: Lincolnshire
- Ambulance: East Midlands
- UK Parliament: Sleaford and North Hykeham

Kirkby Green is a small village in the civil parish of Scopwick, in the North Kesteven district of Lincolnshire, England. The village lies east from Scopwick on the B1191 road to Timberland, 10 miles (16 km) south-east from the county town of Lincoln, 6.5 miles (10.5 km) south-west from Woodhall Spa, and 8 miles (13 km) north from Sleaford. In 1921 the parish had a population of 147. On 1 April 1931 the parish was abolished and merged with Scopwick.

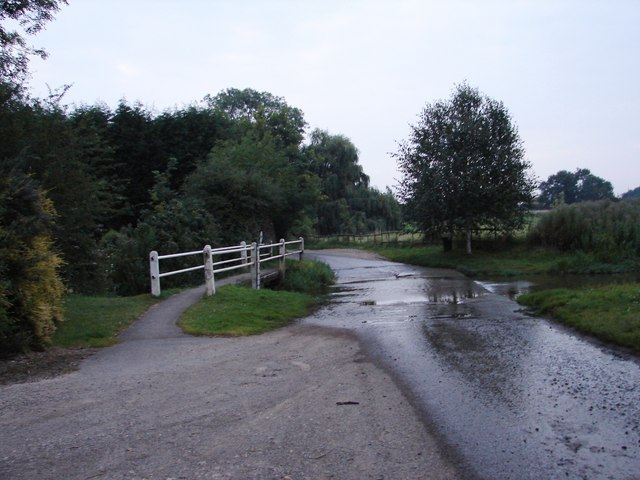
Ford at Kirkby Green

At the eastern end of the village is a level crossing where the road crosses the Peterborough to Lincoln Line, formerly the site of Scopwick and Timberland railway station.
