= Metheringham railway station =

Railway station in Lincolnshire, England

Metheringham
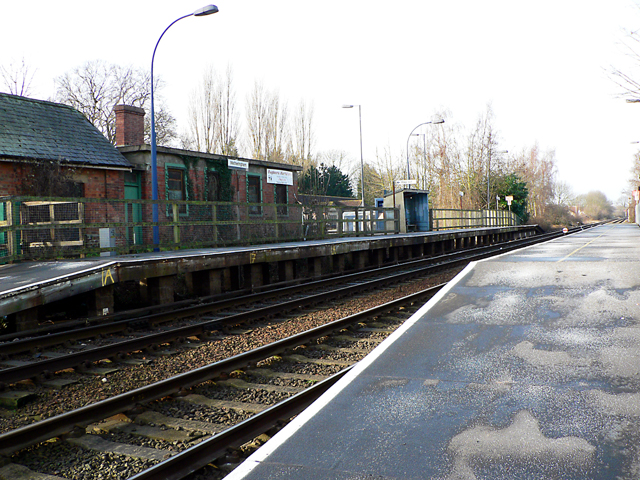

General information
- Location: Metheringham, North Kesteven, Lincolnshire; England
- Coordinates: 53.139°N 0.391°W
- Grid reference: TF077614
- Managed by: East Midlands Railway
- Platforms: 2

Other information
- Station code: MGM
- Classification: DfT category F2

History
- Original company: Great Northern and Great Eastern Joint Railway
- Pre-grouping: Great Northern and Great Eastern Joint Railway
- Post-grouping: London and North Eastern Railway

Key dates
- 1 August 1882: Opened as Blankney and Metheringham
- 11 September 1961: Closed for passengers
- 15 June 1964: closed for goods
- 6 October 1975: Reopened as Metheringham

Passengers
- 2020/21: ▼27,000
- 2021/22: ▲64,858
- 2022/23: ▲68,638
- 2023/24: ▼67,488
- 2024/25: ▲81,930
Location
Notes
- Passenger statistics from the Office of Rail and Road

Metheringham railway station serves the village of Metheringham in Lincolnshire, England. It lies on the Peterborough–Lincoln line. It is owned by Network Rail and managed by East Midlands Railway, which provides all its rail services.

== History ==
The station opened to passengers on 1 July 1882 as Blankney and Metheringham. The line that the Station operated on, stretched from Yorkshire to Cambridgeshire and was built by the Great Northern and Great Eastern Railways. This line became known as the 'Joint Line'.

In the early 20th century, Lord Londesborough constructed a mile long coach road, known as Blankney Ride to take visitors discreetly and directly from the station to his home at Blankney Hall.

During World War II, the Blankney Signal Box was designated as an Emergency Signal Centre that would take over in the case that the Signal Centre at Lincoln would be knocked out.

On the 11th of September 1961, Blankney and Metheringham Train Station had closed. However, passenger trains continued to run on the lines. In 1976 Lincolnshire County Council paid the sum of £7,415 (around £66,887 today) to reopen the station as Metheringham Station, which it is still known by today. Within its first two years of operations, the station had approximately 30,000 passengers per year. In 2008, it was estimated the station had 100,000 passengers.

It was being refurbished in 2019. The signal box at the south end of the station is labelled "Blankney". It formerly operated the level crossing on the B1189 road, but it closed in 2014, with its functions passing to the Lincoln Signalling Control Centre.

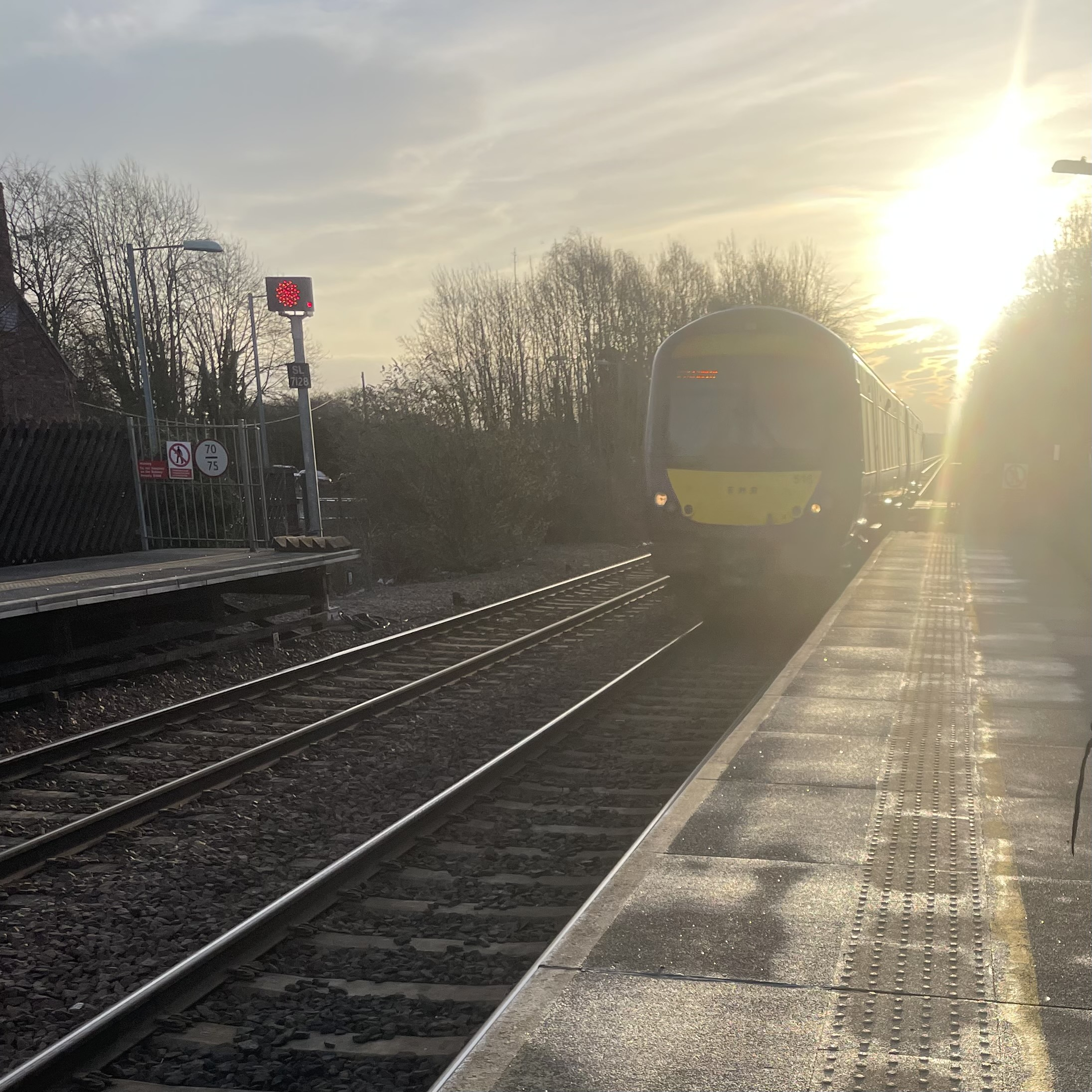
Class 170 pulling into Metheringham Station.

=== Names ===
- Blankney & Metheringham
- Metheringham (from 6 October 1975)

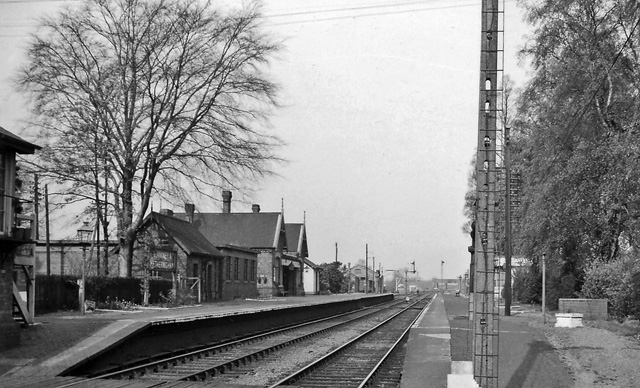
Blankney & Metheringham in 1961

== Facilities ==
The station is unstaffed, and offers limited facilities. Both platforms have shelters and modern help points. There is a small car park and bicycle storage facility at the station. The full range of tickets for travel can be bought from the guard on the train at no extra cost as there are no retail facilities at the station. There is one Departure Board on Platform 1.

== Services ==
All services at Metheringham are operated by East Midlands Railway.

On weekdays and Saturdays, the station is generally served by an hourly service northbound to Lincoln and southbound to Peterborough via Sleaford. Five trains per day are extended beyond Lincoln to Doncaster. The station is also served by a single daily service to and from Newark North Gate.

There is no Sunday service at the station.

Preceding station	National Rail	Following station
Lincoln	East Midlands Railway: Peterborough to Lincoln Line; Monday-Saturday only	Ruskington
	Historical railways	
Nocton and Dunston Line open, station closed	Great Northern and Great Eastern Joint Railway Peterborough to Lincoln Line	Scopwick and Timberland Line open, station closed
