= Digby railway station =

Former railway station in Lincolnshire, England

Digby
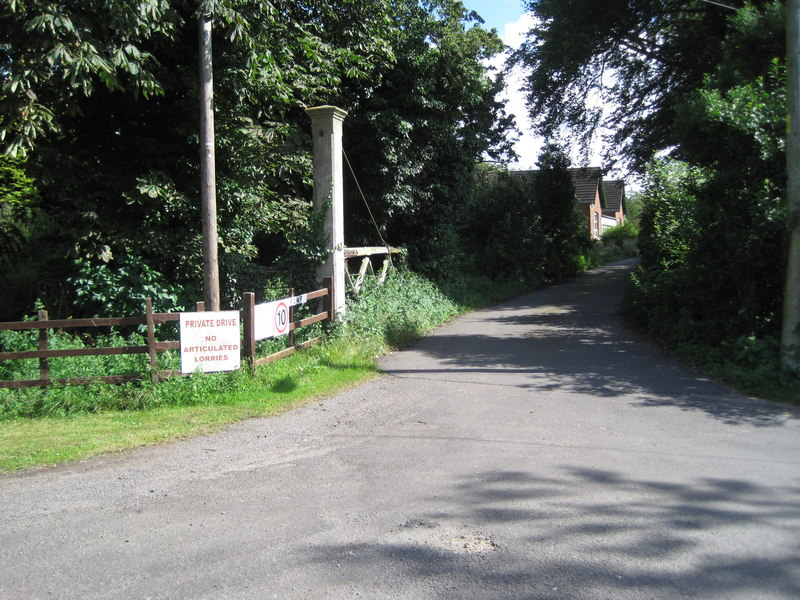
- The site of the station in 2012

General information
- Location: Digby, North Kesteven; England
- Coordinates: 53.0809°N 0.3774°W
- Grid reference: TF088549
- Platforms: 2

Other information
- Status: Disused

History
- Original company: Great Northern and Great Eastern Joint Railway
- Pre-grouping: Great Northern and Great Eastern Joint Railway
- Post-grouping: London and North Eastern Railway

Key dates
- 1 August 1882: Station opened
- 11 September 1961: Station closed for passengers
- 15 June 1964: closed for freight
Location

Digby railway station was a railway station in Digby, Lincolnshire, which was open between 1882 and 1961.

== History ==
The railway line between Sleaford and Lincoln was built by the Great Northern and Great Eastern Joint Railway and opened on 1 August 1882; Digby station opened the same day.

Digby station closed for passengers on 11 September 1961 and freight in 1964 but the line remains open.

| Preceding station | Historical railways | Following station |
|---|---|---|
| Scopwick and Timberland Line open, station closed | Great Northern and Great Eastern Joint Railway | Ruskington Line and station open |
