= Nocton rail crash =

2002 accident in Lincolnshire, England

Coordinates: 53.1555°N 0.4235°W

Nocton rail accident

Details
- Date: 28th February 2002; 18:23 UTC
- Location: Nocton, Lincolnshire
- Country: England
- Line: Peterborough–Lincoln line
- Operator: Central Trains
- Cause: Van crashed onto tracks

Statistics
- Trains: 1
- Vehicles: 1
- Deaths: 1
- Injured: 14

The Nocton rail crash was a rail accident that happened on 28 February 2002 near Nocton, Lincolnshire, England, after a vehicle smashed through a wall and fell onto the railway line. The driver, who was trapped in his van, was talking to emergency services on his mobile phone when his vehicle was hit by an oncoming train, killing him. The incident happened exactly a year to the day after the similar Great Heck rail crash.

== Accident ==
John Fletcher, a 47-year-old delivery driver, was driving a white Mercedes Sprinter van along a stretch of road parallel to the B1188 near Nocton when he turned off along a disused road. The road had once led towards a bridge over the railway line; however this bridge had been removed in 1968 and the approach to the line was blocked by a brick wall. Despite this, the road camber remained in place. After travelling 20 metres (66 ft) along the road, Fletcher's van smashed through the wall and fell 6.1 metres (20 ft) onto the railway, trapping him inside the vehicle.

At 18:30, as Fletcher was talking on his mobile phone to an emergency services operator, the 15:42 Central Trains service from Birmingham New Street station to Sleaford via Lincoln, a two-carriage Class 156 Super Sprinter train (156409) travelling at 55 miles per hour (89 km/h), impacted his van and shunted it 40 metres (130 ft) along the tracks.

== Casualties and damage ==
According to a police statement the van disintegrated into "a thousand pieces if not more". Fletcher died of multiple injuries. The front carriage of the train was derailed, remaining upright. Fourteen of the train's 41 occupants, including the driver, were taken to Lincoln County Hospital with minor injuries. Nobody onboard the train was killed.
