= Bessacarr Halt railway station =

Former railway station in South Yorkshire, England

Bessacarr Halt

General information
- Location: Bessacarr, Doncaster; England
- Coordinates: 53.49593°N 1.07461°W
- Grid reference: SE614003
- Platforms: 2

Other information
- Status: Disused

History
- Original company: Great Northern and Great Eastern Joint Railway
- Pre-grouping: Great Northern and Great Eastern Joint Railway
- Post-grouping: London and North Eastern Railway

Key dates
- c. 1912: Station opened
- c. 1924: Station closed
Location

Bessacarr railway halt was a small halt on the Great Northern and Great Eastern Joint Railway in the suburbs of Doncaster, South Yorkshire, England. It was the first halt south of Doncaster, being just 2 1/2 miles (4 km) south of the town on the Joint line following a series of flying junctions and a direct connection to the South Yorkshire Joint Railway.

The halt opened in 1912 but did not appear in public timetables and was closed in 1924.

The site of Bessacarr Halt, along with 7 others, was highlighted as a possible "new station" under a report to Doncaster Borough Council in September 2008, with reopening at some future date a possibility.
