= Great Northern and Great Eastern Joint Railway =

Defunct railway in England

The Great Northern and Great Eastern Joint Railway, colloquially referred to as "the Joint Line" was a railway line connecting Doncaster and Lincoln with March and Huntingdon in the eastern counties of England. It was owned jointly by the Great Northern Railway (GNR) and the Great Eastern Railway (GER). It was formed by transferring certain route sections from the parent companies, and by the construction of a new route between Spalding and Lincoln, and a number of short spurs and connections. It was controlled by a Joint Committee, and the owning companies operated their own trains with their own rolling stock. The Joint Line amounted to nearly 123 miles (198 km) of route.

The motivation for its formation was chiefly the desire of the GER to get direct access to the coalfields of South Yorkshire and elsewhere, and the wish of the GNR to discourage more ambitious incursion by the GER into its own territory, as well as the provision of relief to the congested East Coast Main Line. The dominant traffic was coal, but a wide variety of manufactured and agricultural products was carried. There was some local passenger business, and some long-distance passenger trains used the route.

The route became a trunk artery for freight traffic, especially coal, and a large marshalling complex developed at Whitemoor, near March, for the sorting of wagons. In the 1920s a modern mechanised system was installed at Whitemoor, the most advanced such installation in Great Britain at the time.

Running largely through flat terrain, the line had numerous level crossings, especially in the southern section, and as wagon-load freight movements of coal declined after about 1960, the cost of operating the line became excessive compared to the use made of it. In 1982 the section from Spalding to Whitemoor was closed, trains being diverted via the Spalding to Peterborough line; in addition many intermediate stations on the remaining route section were closed. The nomenclature "the Joint Line" was transferred to mean the route via Peterborough.

In the 21st century congestion on the East Coast Main Line had again become a problem, and resignalling, loading gauge enhancements, and partial upgrade of the remaining route took place, to enable container freight trains from Felixstowe and elsewhere to use the line; the project was commissioned in 2015. Most of the line remains in use for that traffic and a local passenger service.

== Early railways ==
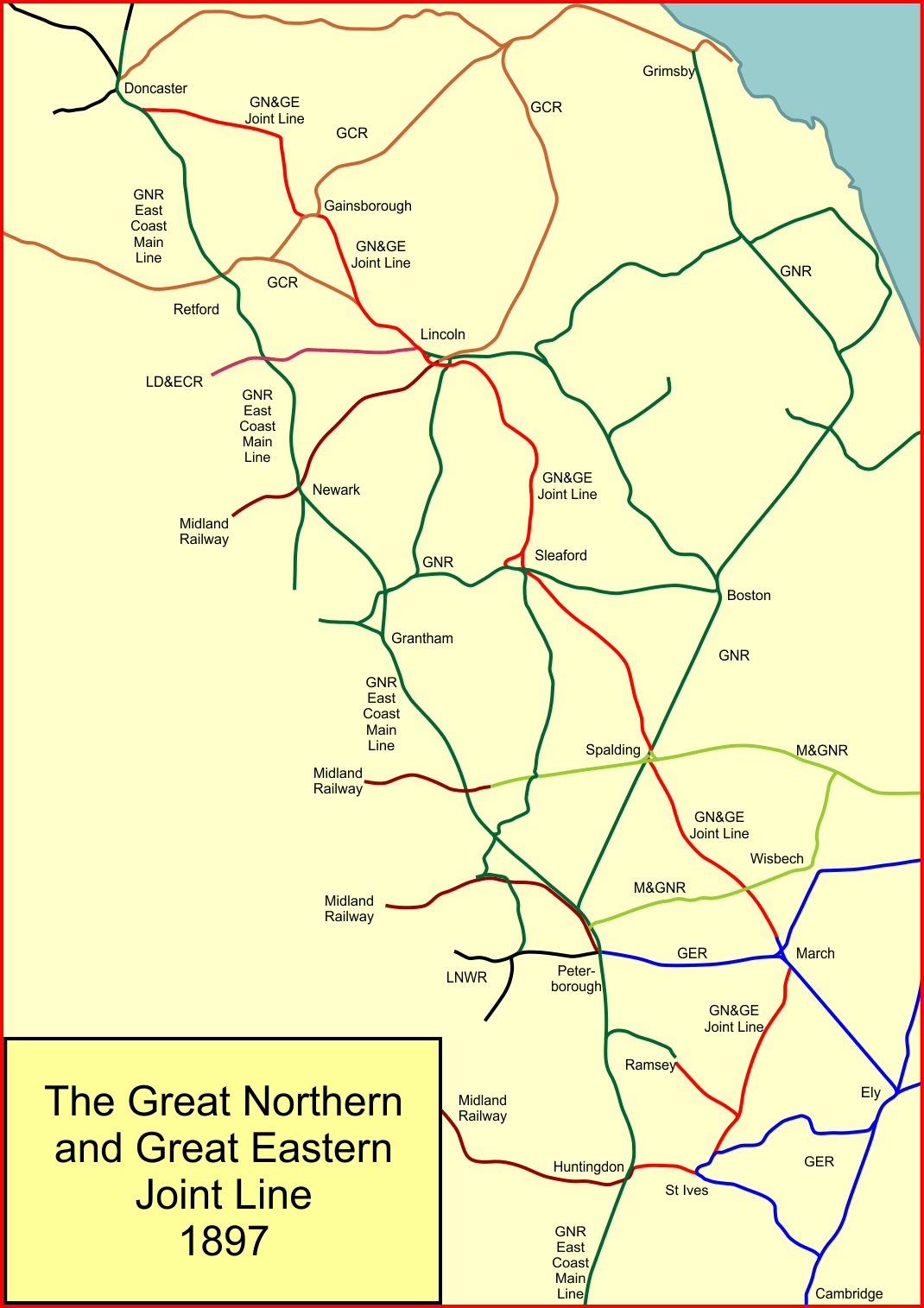
The Joint Line when completed in 1897

In the 1830s the imagination of railway promoters led to proposed schemes to link the major centres of Great Britain. In 1834 a "Grand Northern and Eastern Railway" was proposed, and in 1835 a "Great Northern Railway" (nothing to do with the later Great Northern Railway of the 1850s) was projected. Both of these schemes were for a line from London to York through Cambridge. Many of the early schemes failed, and none was built north of Cambridge for many years.

In 1847, the Eastern Counties Railway (ECR) opened its line from Ely to March and Peterborough. The ECR chairman was George Hudson, often referred to as the Railway King. Hudson was determined that the group of railways he controlled would dominate the scene. His dubious methods were later exposed and he was disgraced, but in the meantime he sought to extend the ECR northwards, to get access to the huge flows of coal from South Yorkshire and elsewhere to London, and of merchandise. As well as the income from carrying a share of this traffic, the company would get better access to engine coal for their own business.

== Constituent companies ==
=== Great Northern Railway ===
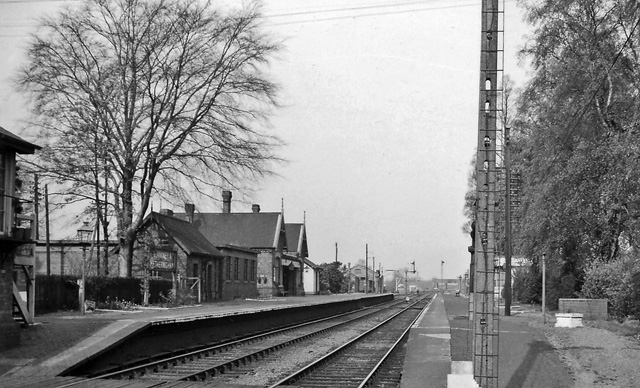
Blankney & Metheringham station

The Great Northern Railway (GNR) was authorised in 1846 to build a main line from London to York, with a loop line from Peterborough to Bawtry (a few miles south of Doncaster) by way of Boston and Lincoln.

In 1848 the GNR opened a line from near Peterborough through Spalding via Boston to Lincoln, and a section from Retford to Doncaster in 1849. The section from London to Peterborough was opened in 1850, and in 1852 Peterborough to Retford was opened, completing the main line from London to Doncaster, part of the present-day East Coast Main Line. An extension from Lincoln to Gainsborough was opened in 1849.

GNR trains arriving at Gainsborough joined the Manchester, Sheffield and Lincolnshire Railway (MS&LR) and reversed into that railway's station (now Gainsborough Central) there. The GNR wished to complete the loop from there to rejoin the main line at Doncaster and this was authorised in 1864, opening on 15 July 1867.

Great Northern Railway (Spalding to March) Act 1863
- Act of Parliament
- Parliament of the United Kingdom
- Long title: An Act to enable the Great Northern Railway Company to extend their Railway from Spalding to the Great Eastern Railway at March in Cambridgeshire.
- Citation: 26 & 27 Vict. c. cxci

Dates
- Royal assent: 21 July 1863

Text of statute as originally enacted

A branch from Spalding to March was authorised by the Great Northern Railway (Spalding to March) Act 1863 (26 & 27 Vict. c. cxci); running powers over it were granted to the GER; it opened in 1867. March was an important junction on the GER system where traffic for much of East Anglia could be exchanged. The future Joint Line route was therefore in place between March and Spalding, and between Lincoln and Doncaster.

It was the GNR which provided the siding group at March that became the nucleus of the later Whitemoor Yard complex.

=== Great Eastern Railway ===
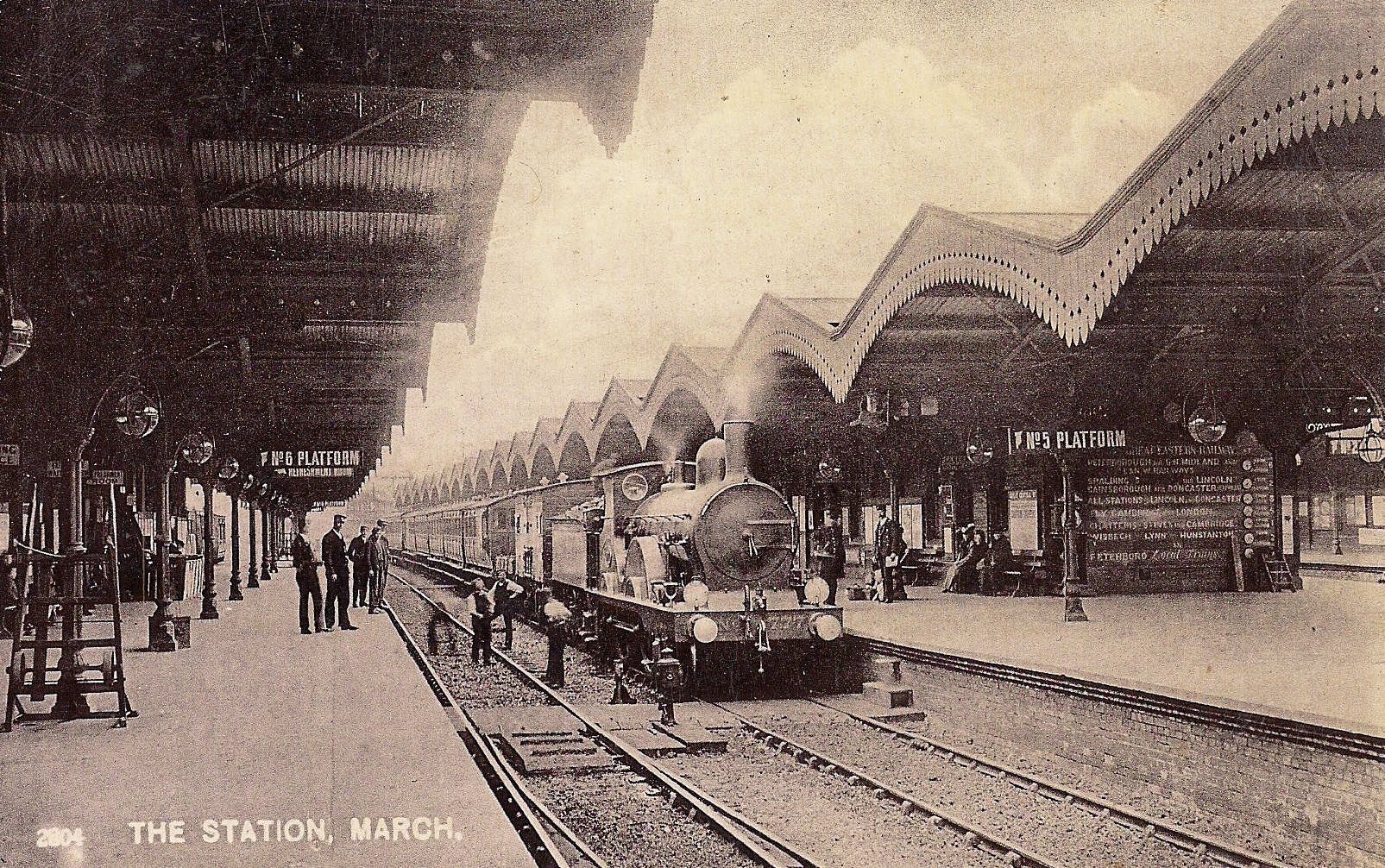
March railway station

In 1862 the Great Eastern Railway (GER) was formed by the amalgamation of the Eastern Counties Railway, the Eastern Union Railway, and other smaller concerns in East Anglia. The GER dominated the railway scene in its own area, but the sparse population density and the relatively undeveloped industrial activity limited the railway's commercial potential. Once again thoughts turned to the lucrative traffic in coal from South Yorkshire, and also in manufactures to and from London, and export traffic to the North Sea ports.

In 1863, therefore, the GER submitted a bill to build a line from March to Spalding, and to get running powers over the GNR's line from there to Doncaster. The GNR naturally wished to fend this off, and it deposited a bill to build a line from Spalding to March; the GNR line was the one passed by Parliament (21 July 1863, described above), and the GER scheme was turned down. The GER was given running powers over this line, but only as far as Spalding and not further over the GNR lines.

In frustration, the GER presented another bill in 1864, to build an independent line from Longstanton, on its Cambridge to St Ives line, via Peterborough, Bourne, Sleaford, Lincoln and Gainsborough to a junction with the West Riding and Grimsby Railway at Askern, north of Doncaster. Once again the GER scheme was turned down in Parliament.

== History ==
=== Early discussion of collaboration ===
The GNR was developing friendly relations with the GER over lines in Norfolk; moreover it sensed that sooner or later one of the GER attempts in Parliament must be successful, so it offered the GER running powers for coal traffic from Gainsborough to Spalding. This was considerably less than the GER was seeking, and the GER therefore suggested to the GNR that the two companies should be joint owners of the GNR loop line between Spalding and Gainsborough, and also of the GNR lines then under construction between Spalding and March, and Gainsborough and Doncaster. At this time running powers were granted to the GER over the lines of the West Riding and Grimsby Railway (jointly owned by the GNR and the MS&LR), and the MS&LR agreed to exchange traffic with the GER at Lincoln.

The Great Eastern decided to build on the mood of constructive cooperation, and in 1864 suggested to the GNR a new and direct joint line from Spalding to Lincoln through Sleaford. The GNR saw that this would shorten the route of its loop line through Boston, and agreed, and a bill was prepared for the 1867 session of Parliament for the scheme. However the GER was in serious financial difficulty at this time, and a new Board was elected as a result of shareholder disquiet; "the new [GER] board had to face the hard facts that the kitty was empty, and there was not the remotest chance of finding the money which their predecessors had so rashly undertaken to pay the GN". In fact the GER had to find £1.5 million urgently to put its existing system in good order. The ensuing years were marked by a return to the old hostilities, and for the time being, joint railways were off the agenda.

The GER revived the proposal in 1872, but the GNR made demands that were far too high for the GER to agree, and once again the scheme lapsed, until discussions were reopened in May 1876. This time the GNR proposed amalgamation, but the GER declined. In 1878 the GER was seriously considering the revival of the plan to build its own line through Sleaford and Lincoln to Askern. Just as the GER sought northward access to the coalfields, the GNR was "desperate for an alternative route to relieve the main line", and the GNR countered by depositing a fresh bill for a direct line from Spalding to Lincoln via Sleaford.

Great Northern Railway (Spalding to Lincoln) Act 1878
- Act of Parliament
- Parliament of the United Kingdom
- Long title: An Act to enable the Great Northern Railway Company to extend their Railway from Spalding to Lincoln; and for other purposes.
- Citation: 41 & 42 Vict. c. xcviii

Dates
- Royal assent: 17 June 1878

Text of statute as originally enacted

This time it made more friendly advances to the GER in suggesting that the Huntingdon to Ely line should be included in the proposed joint system. Although the GER turned the proposal down, and in fact tried its own bill in Parliament, the GNR scheme won the day as the Great Northern Railway (Spalding to Lincoln) Act 1878 (41 & 42 Vict. c. xcviii). The GNR was obliged by the act to give the GER the running powers it desired; the two companies were to return to Parliament in the next session with a joint scheme. Thus were the origins of the Joint Line created.

And whereas it is expedient to provide for more intimate connexion between the undertakings of the Great Northern and the Great Eastern Railway Companies, and the said two companies have agreed to such provisions: Be it therefore enacted, that the two companies shall concur in promoting a Bill in the next session of Parliament for that purpose, and the conditions set forth in the Second Schedule to this Act shall be the basis upon which the said Bill shall be founded. — Section 29, Great Northern Railway (Spalding to Lincoln) Act 1878 (41 & 42 Vict. c. xcviii)

=== The Joint Line authorised ===
Great Northern and Great Eastern Railway Companies Act 1879
- Act of Parliament
- Parliament of the United Kingdom
- Long title: An Act to provide for more intimate connexion between the Undertakings of the Great Northern and the Great Eastern Railway Companies.
- Citation: 42 & 43 Vict. c. cx

Dates
- Royal assent: 3 July 1879

Text of statute as originally enacted

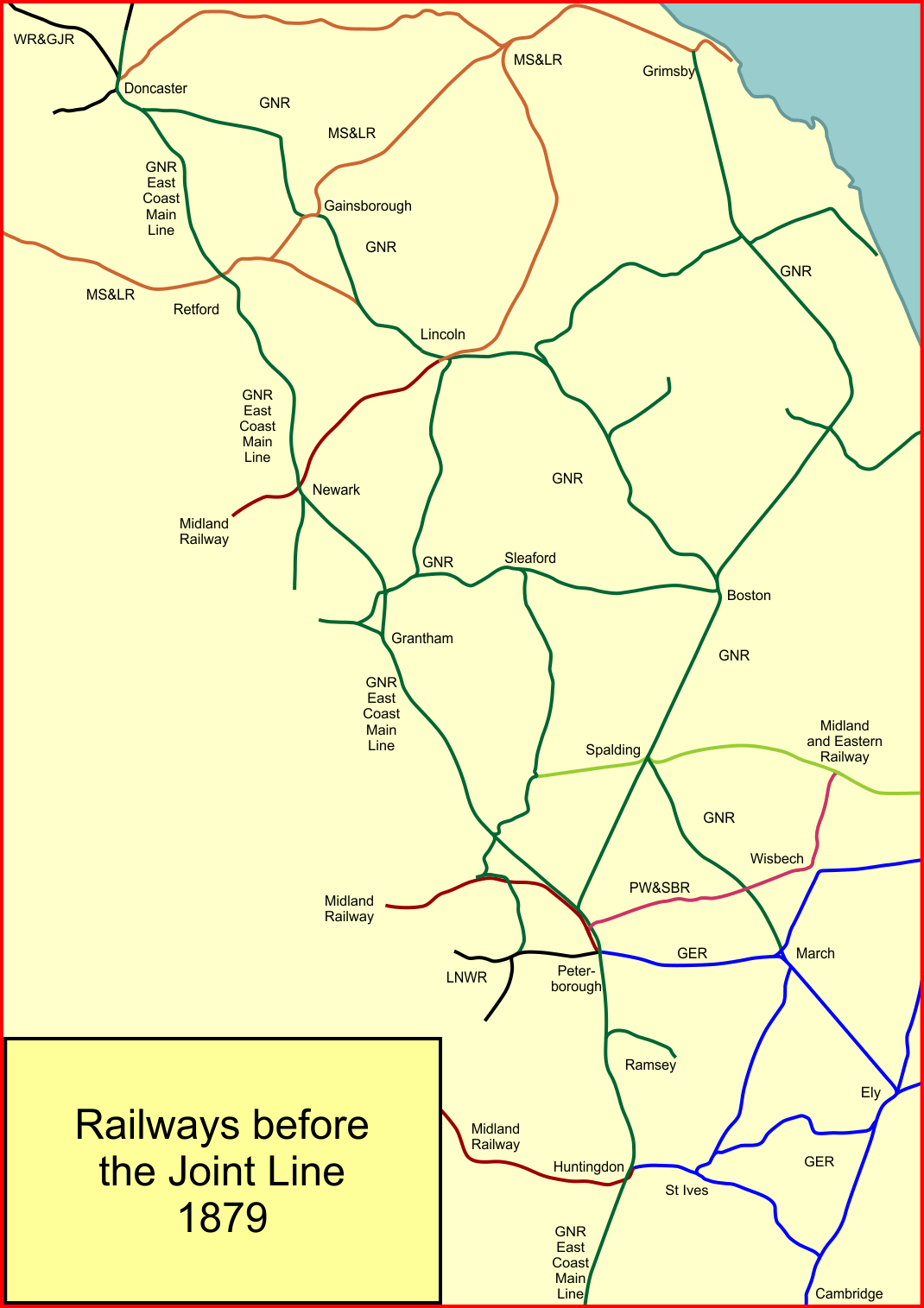
The area of the future Joint Line in 1879

The two companies did return to Parliament, and on 3 July 1879 the parliamentary bill authorising the Joint Line was passed as the Great Northern and Great Eastern Railway Companies Act 1879 (42 & 43 Vict. c. cx). The GNR lines from Black Carr Junction (south of Doncaster) to Lincoln, and Spalding to March, and the GER lines from Huntingdon to St Ives, and from Needingworth Junction (near St Ives) to March, were to be transferred to Joint ownership. A new line was to be built from Spalding to Lincoln; and the junctions at Huntingdon and St Ives were to be improved. A Joint Committee was to be established to manage the line, and the GER was to pay the GNR £415,000, the difference in value of the respective lines becoming joint.

Five directors from each of the companies formed the Joint Committee; it first met on 11 August 1879. C. H. Parkes of the GER was in the chair. The GN & GE Joint Railway was not a corporate body, and never had its own locomotives or rolling stock. Most of the track on the St Ives to March line and about three miles (5 km) of the St Ives to Huntingdon line needed to be renewed, and additionally the St Ives to Huntingdon line was to be doubled later. The March to Spalding line was to be resignalled.

=== The Joint Committee takes control ===
Part of the new Lincoln line, between Spalding and Ruskington, about 21 miles (34 km), was opened on 6 March 1882. On the same day the GNR March to Spalding line and the GER Huntingdon to St Ives and Needingworth Junction to March lines were transferred to the Joint Committee. The new line bypassed the existing Sleaford station on the GNR's Grantham to Boston line, reflecting the primacy of mineral traffic, but spurs were constructed on both sides of Sleaford to enable passenger trains on the Joint Line to call there. The GER ran five passenger trains each way daily on the new section, and the GNR ran a daily goods train.

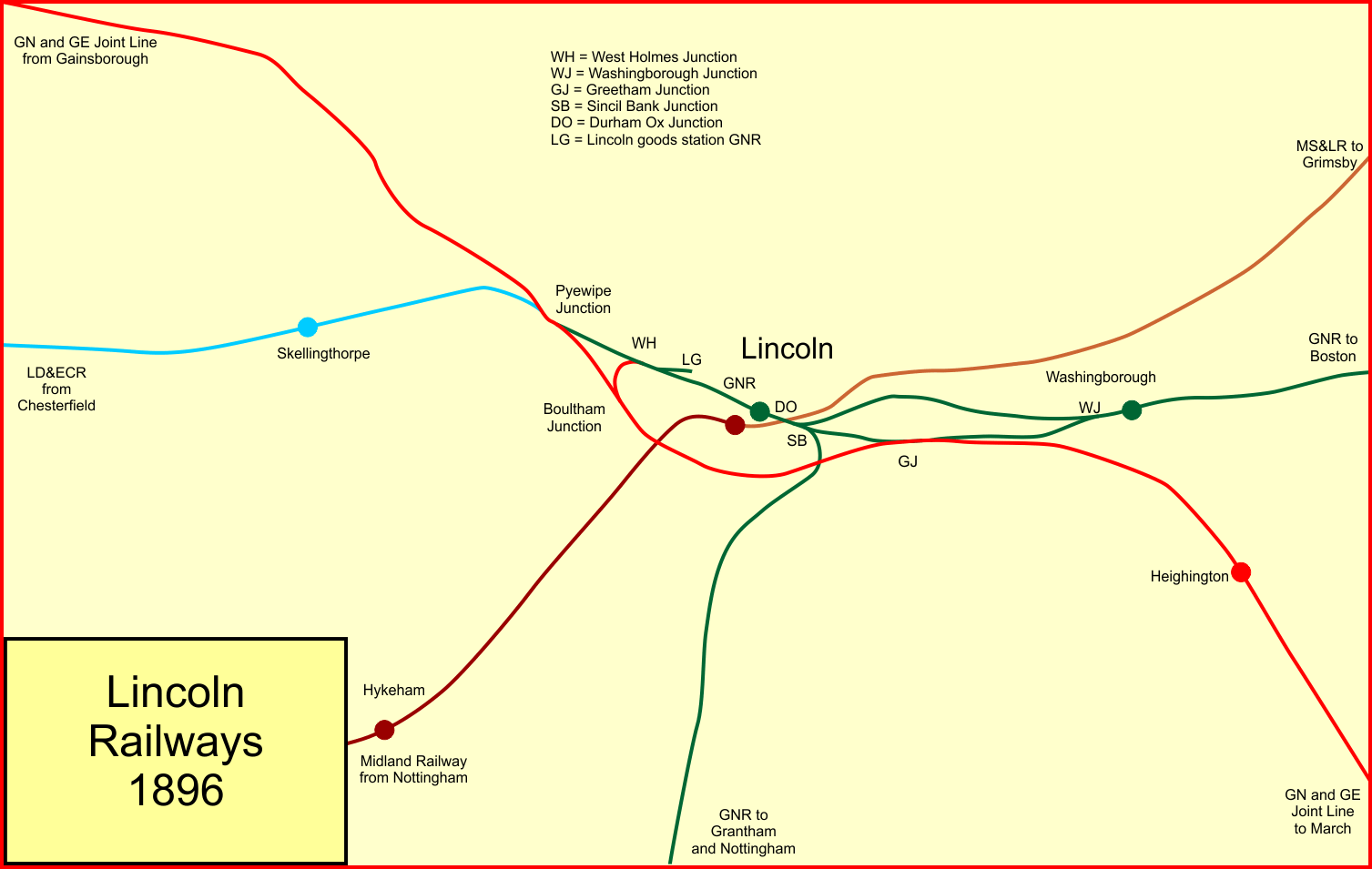
Lincoln railways in 1896

The section from Ruskington to Sincil Bank Junction, near Lincoln, was opened for goods traffic on 1 July 1882, and for passengers on 1 August 1882. This was 16 miles (26 km) in length; there was an avoiding line to pass Lincoln passenger station; it ran from Greetham Junction (just east of Sincil Bank Junction) to join the onward joint line at Pyewipe Junction. It opened for goods traffic on the same day; a spur turning back to Lincoln (from Boultham Junction to West Holmes Junction) enabled goods traffic to use the goods yard there without passing through the passenger station. Greetham Junction was the convergence of the new Joint Line with the GNR route from Boston, but to reduce congestion the Great Northern and Great Eastern Railway Companies Act 1879 authorised the construction of a one-mile (1.6 km) duplicate line, from Washingborough Junction (as it became) to Greetwell East Junction; this enabled the GNR Boston line goods traffic to join the Joint Line and get access to the avoiding line. This line opened on 7 June 1883. (Note: Goode says 6 June (page 13).)

- A Railway (E) (1. mile 1 furlong 3·30 chains in length), commencing in the parish of Washingborough by a junction with the loop line of the Great Northern Railway about two hundred and sixty yards west of the Washingborough Station, and terminating in the parish of Canwick by a junction with the intended Railway (D); provided that the Great Northern Railway Company alone shall construct, maintain, and work Railway (E).
— Section 4, Great Northern and Great Eastern Railway Companies Act 1879 (42 & 43 Vict. c. cx)

The next day the GNR transferred the Black Carr Junction to Pyewipe Junction line to the joint committee, and the GER paid over £383,760 (Note: £31,330 had already been paid as a deposit, so that the agreed £415,000 had now been fully paid.) for the value of the transferred railway. The GER wasted no time in diverting the southbound coal traffic over the route; up until that time it had received the traffic from the GNR at Peterborough. The GNR diverted mineral traffic to the route, relieving the main line. The Lincoln avoiding line was a goods-only route at first but on 20 March 1883 the Board of Trade sanctioned its use for passenger trains if required. Lincoln passenger station improvements were carried out in 1883.

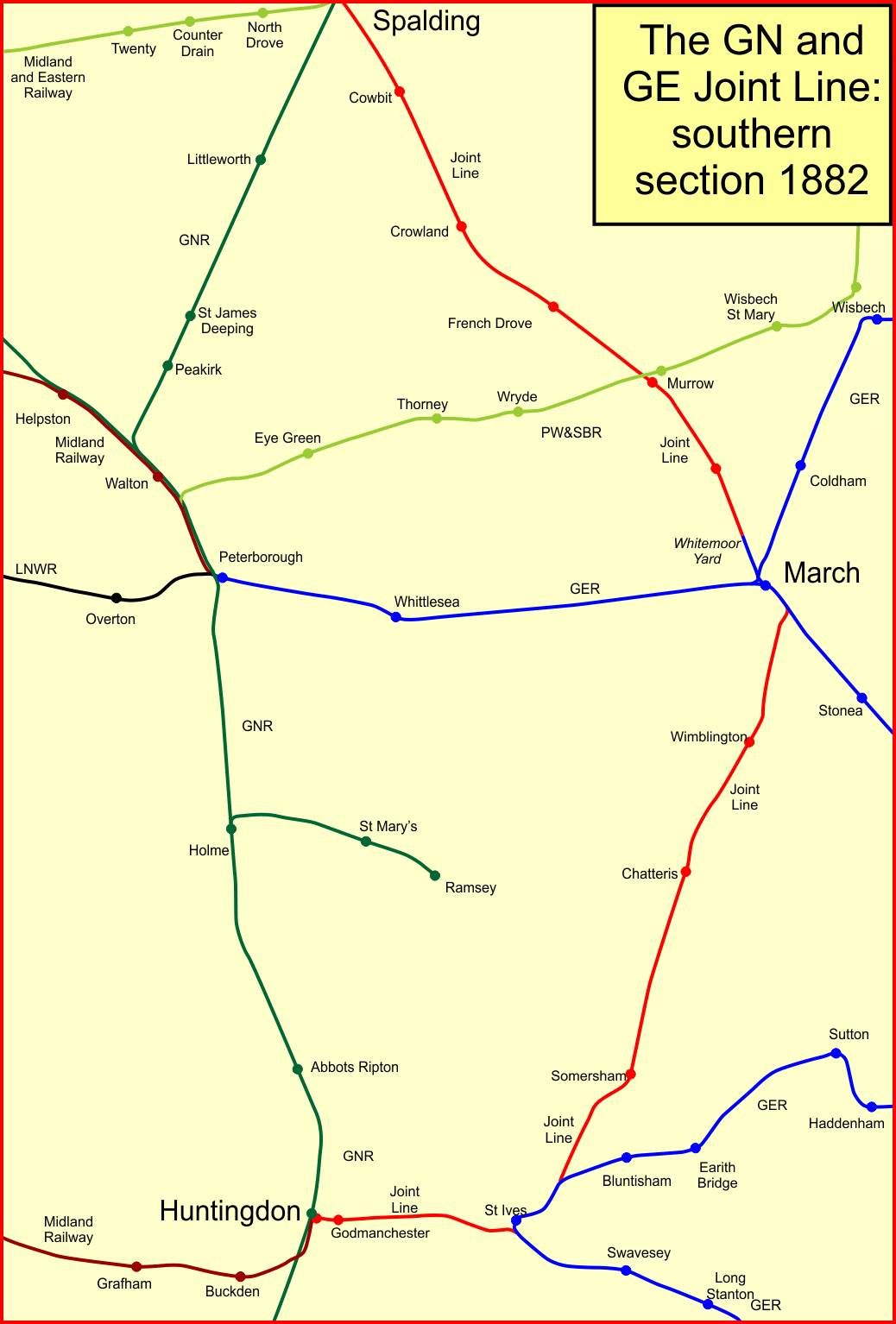
The southern end of the Joint Line

Further south a new connection was made at Huntingdon, where GNR mineral trains regained their own track. The old junctions there had long since fallen into disuse. The connection from the Joint Line faced south and converged with the GNR main line 16 chains (320 m) south of Huntingdon station: a new Joint station (independent of the GNR main line station) was built, to accommodate also the Midland Railway trains from Kettering. The station opened on 1 May 1883, and the GNR started an experimental passenger service from there to March, but it did not attract much business, and was withdrawn from 1 November 1883. On that day the GER had been running trains from its network to Godmanchester (still named "Huntingdon" until 1 July 1882) and on cessation of the GNR service extended its own trains to the Joint station at Huntingdon. The Midland Railway ran passenger trains over that part of the route to Cambridge. The GNR had been running goods trains to March but withdrew them also, now only running a limited goods service to St Ives.

=== Extent of Joint Committee control ===
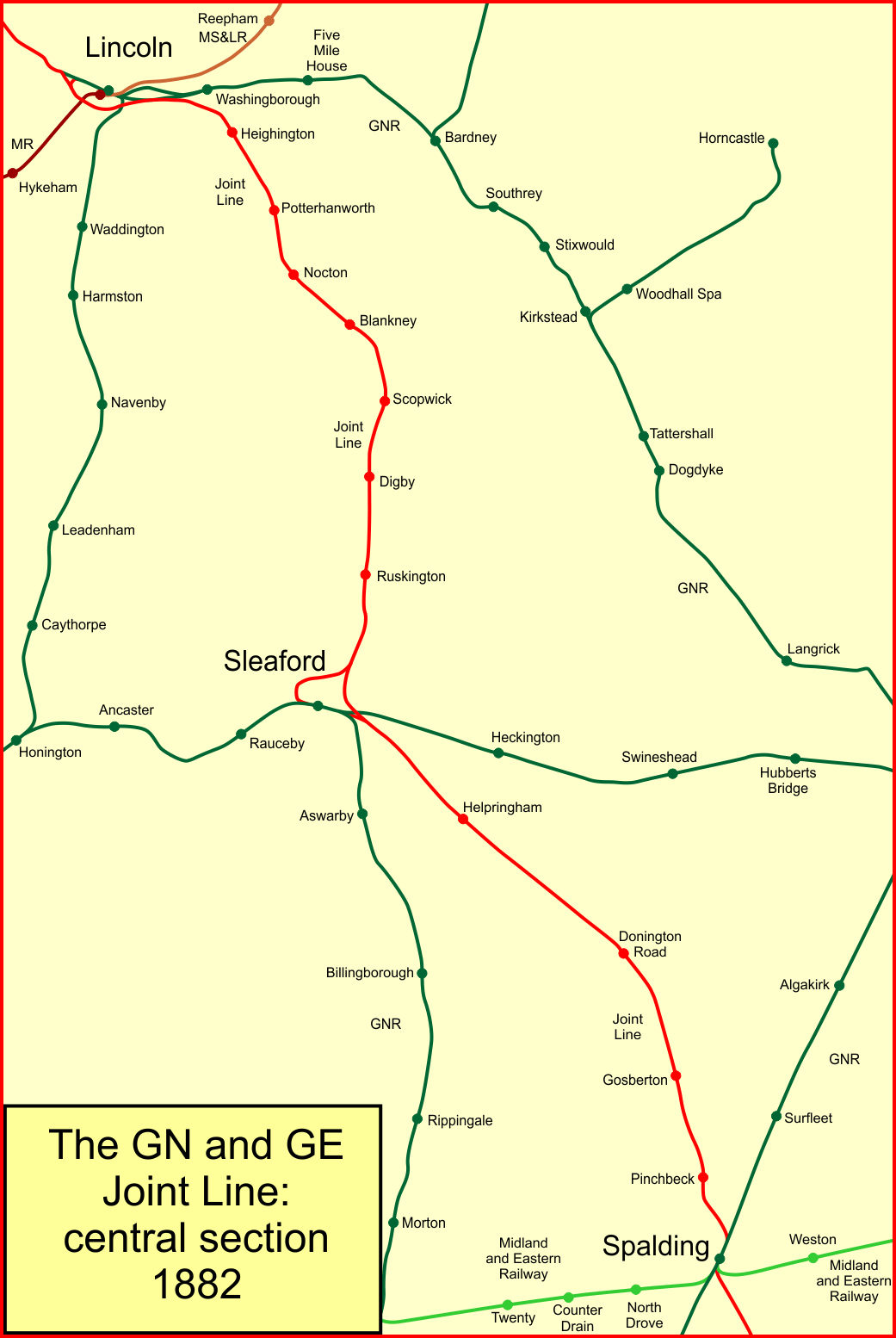
The central section of the Joint Line

The extent of the route directly controlled by the Joint Committee was from Black Carr Junction, south of Doncaster, to Huntingdon by way of the Lincoln avoiding line and St Ives (reverse); but there were discontinuities where the Joint Committee had running powers over other companies' lines:

- Crossing the River Trent at Gainsborough: South (or West Trent) Junction to North (or East Trent) Junction; (MS&LR, later Great Central Railway);
- Through Spalding station: Spalding North Junction to Spalding Joint Line Junction; (GNR);
- Passing Whitemoor and March station: Grassmoor Junction to March, St Ives Junction; (Note: That is, the junction near March where the southward line to St Ives left the southward line to Ely.) (GER); the GNR yard at Whitemoor was to be transferred to the GER;
- Approaching and through St Ives station: Needingworth Junction to St Ives Junction (Note: That is, the junction at St Ives where the line from Huntingdon and the line from March converged.) (GER).

Additional sections that were under Joint Committee control were:

- Boultham Junction to West Holmes Junction (Lincoln);
- Spur towards Sleaford GNR station: Sleaford North Junction to West Junction;
- Ramsey branch (from 1 January 1897).

=== Supplementary issues ===
The GER provided additional siding accommodation at March (Whitemoor) and in November 1884 opened a north to west spur at March, making a triangle there, to enable trains from the Joint Line to reach Peterborough.

John Crabtree, formerly manager of the Colne Valley Railway, was appointed to be manager of the Joint Lines at a salary of £600 annually. Maintenance of the Joint Line south of the Sleaford–Boston line was to be the responsibility of the GER, and north of that line the task of the GNR. The GER had to pay tolls to pass the MS&LR bridge over the River Trent at Gainsborough, as the Joint Line was routed over the pre-existing MS&LR line there; an independent bridge had earlier been considered.

The Joint Line proved a huge advantage to the GER, which gained direct and indirect access to a large area of colliery working at a time when the demand for domestic, industrial and export coal was very considerable. By contrast the GNR suffered a loss of income, £81,000 in the first year, chiefly due to the loss of haulage of coal that was now in the hands of the GER. Anderson comments: "Ironically the Joint line actually hurt the GN. Its value as relief for the congested main line was less than expected, and the GE soon became established as a major competitor."

=== Ramsey ===
Great Eastern Railway (Ramsey Branch) Act 1865
- Act of Parliament
- Parliament of the United Kingdom
- Long title: An Act to authorize the Great Eastern Railway Company to make a Railway from their Saint Ives and March Railway at Somersham to the Ramsey Railway at Ramsey in the County of Huntingdon.
- Citation: 28 & 29 Vict. c. lxii

Dates
- Royal assent: 2 June 1865

Ramsey and Somersham Junction Railway Act 1875
- Act of Parliament
- Parliament of the United Kingdom
- Long title: An Act to incorporate a Company for making a Railway from the Holme and Ramsey Railway at Ramsey, to the Great Eastern Railway at Somersham; and for other purposes.
- Citation: 38 & 39 Vict. c. ccxii

Dates
- Royal assent: 13 August 1875

Text of statute as originally enacted

Ramsey and Somersham Junction Railway Act 1878
- Act of Parliament
- Parliament of the United Kingdom
- Long title: n Act to extend the time limited for the compulsory purchase of lands and completion of the Railway and Works authorised by the Ramsey and Somersham Junction Railway Act, 1875; and for other purposes.
- Citation: 41 & 42 Vict. c. cxliii

Dates
- Royal assent: 4 July 1878

Text of statute as originally enacted

Ramsey and Somersham Junction Railway Act 1881
- Act of Parliament
- Parliament of the United Kingdom
- Long title: An Act to extend the time limited for the compulsory purchase of Lands and completion of the Railway and Works authorised by the Ramsey and Somersham Junction Railway Acts 1875 and 1878 and for other purposes.
- Citation: 44 & 45 Vict. c. xii

Dates
- Royal assent: 8 April 1881

Text of statute as originally enacted

Ramsey and Somersham Junction Railway Act 1883
- Act of Parliament
- Parliament of the United Kingdom
- Long title: An Act to extend the time limited for the compulsory purchase of lands and houses and completion of the railway and works authorised by the Ramsey and Somersham Junction Railway Act 1875 and for other purposes.
- Citation: 46 & 47 Vict. c. cl

Dates
- Royal assent: 2 August 1883

A railway from Somersham to Ramsey had been originally authorised by the Great Eastern Railway (Ramsey Branch) Act 1865 (28 & 29 Vict. c. lxii). It was authorised again as Ramsey and Somersham Junction Railway by the Ramsey and Somersham Junction Railway Act 1875 (38 & 39 Vict. c. ccxii) and opened in September 1889; Somersham Junction was on the Joint Line a short distance north of St Ives. It was a single line 7 miles (11 km) in length, with a terminus in Ramsey and an intermediate station at Warboys. It was worked from the outset by the GER. There was already a Ramsey branch from the west, joining the Huntingdon to Peterborough main line at Holme, and it had originally been under the control of the GER, although it only connected to the GNR at Holme, and it was alter leased to the GNR. The two branches had separate, unconnected stations at Ramsey. The GER had contemplated connecting them, as a means of getting a through connection to the GNR main line, but the Joint Line reduced the projected benefit of that scheme.

Great Northern Railway Act 1896
- Act of Parliament
- Parliament of the United Kingdom
- Long title: An Act to confer further powers upon the Great Northern Railway Company to empower the Great Eastern Railway Company to grant a further lease of their Ramsey Railway to that Company to vest in the Great Northern and Great Eastern Joint Committee the undertaking of the Ramsey and Somersham Junction Railway Company and for other purposes.
- Citation: 59 & 60 Vict. c. cxxxviii

Dates
- Royal assent: 20 July 1896

Text of statute as originally enacted

In October 1895 the GN and GE decided to make the branch part of the joint line; the GER was to work it for 30% of receipts, the balance being divided between the two owners. The Great Northern Railway Act 1896 (59 & 60 Vict. c. cxxxviii) of 29 July 1896 authorised this and it became effective from 1 January 1897. The GNR ran only very occasional goods trains on the line.

=== St Ives ===
The route from March to Huntingdon involved a reversal at St Ives. The track layout at St Ives included three long sidings from the point of junction stretching towards Fenstanton. GNR goods trains reversing there must have used the sidings for the purpose. Reversal at St Ives for the GNR mineral trains from Yorkshire to London would have been inconvenient, and it appears that they generally used the Spalding to Peterborough line to join the main line instead. The St Ives route was chiefly used for access to March for general and local goods trains.

=== GER alliances in the north ===
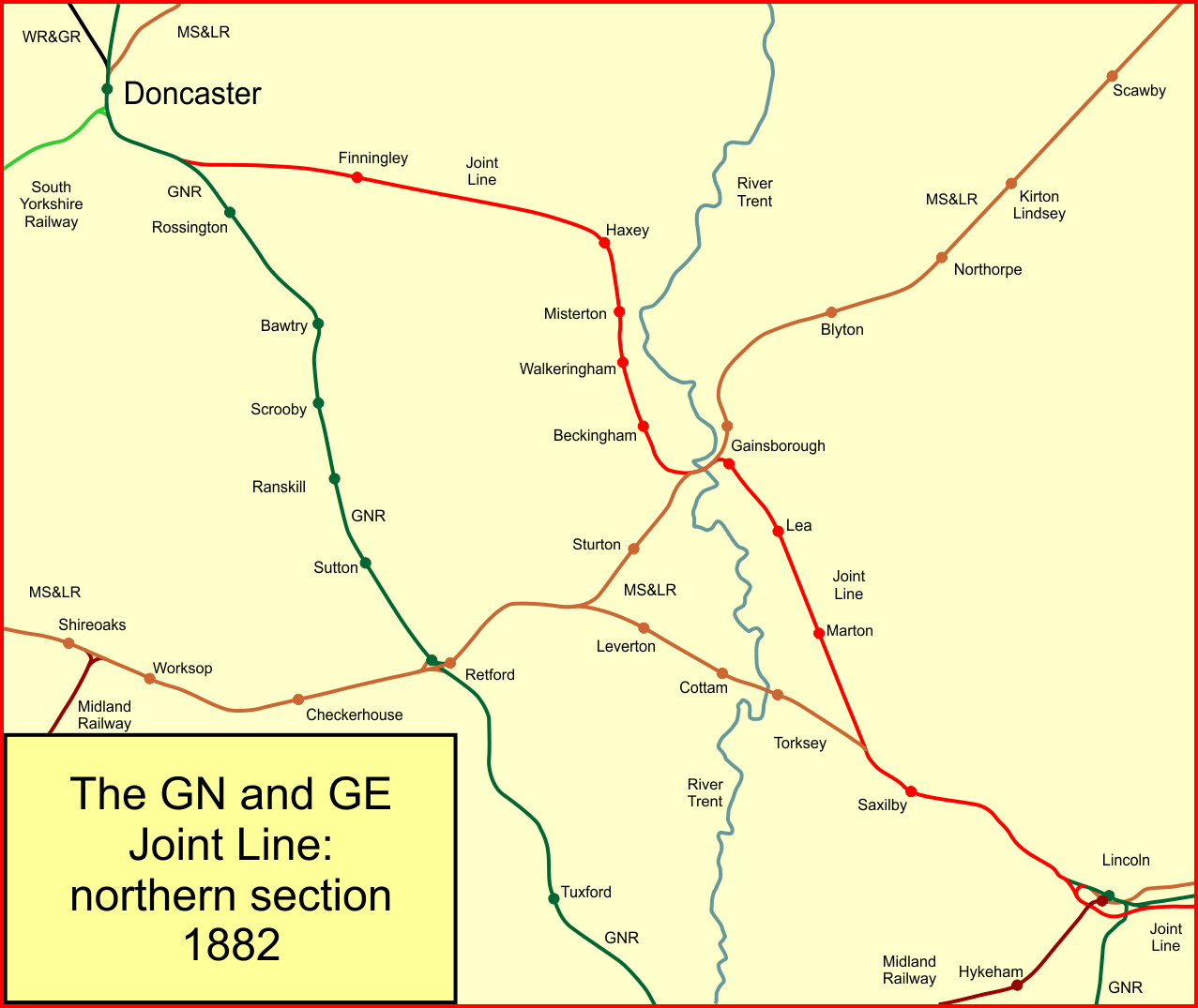
The Joint Line at its northern end

Although the Joint Line gave the GER access to Doncaster, the company was still anxious to get direct access to coal mines, and this led it to give considerable financial support to a proposed railway that became the Lancashire, Derbyshire and East Coast Railway. It was to run from both Manchester and Warrington, through Buxton and Chesterfield, crossing (and connecting to) the GNR main line at Tuxford, and continuing to Lincoln and the east coast at Sutton-on-Sea (near Mablethorpe). A large dock complex was to be built there for coal export. In return for its financial help, the GER got running powers. In fact the LD&ECR was unable to get the huge amount of investment capital it needed, and only built the section between Chesterfield and Lincoln; nevertheless this gave the GER the access it wanted to some important colliery areas.

The truncated LD&ECR reached Pyewipe Junction, Lincoln, from Barlborough Colliery on the Beighton line, on 16 November 1896. All hope of reaching Sutton-on-Sea had now been abandoned, and the LD&ECR had to beg the Joint Committee to allow it to run through Lincoln station so as to join the MS&LR at Durham Ox Junction (immediately east of Lincoln GNR station), thereby getting access to docks at Grimsby. This meant heavy and slow mineral trains running through the central area of Lincoln as the MS&LR (Note: The Manchester, Sheffield and Lincoln Railway changed its name to the Great Central Railway on 1 August 1897.) line could not be accessed from the avoiding line.

When the Sheffield District Railway was built (opening in 1900), it was operated as an offshoot of the LD&ECR line. As a result, it gave further penetration into mineral and industrial areas for the GER.

=== Passenger services ===
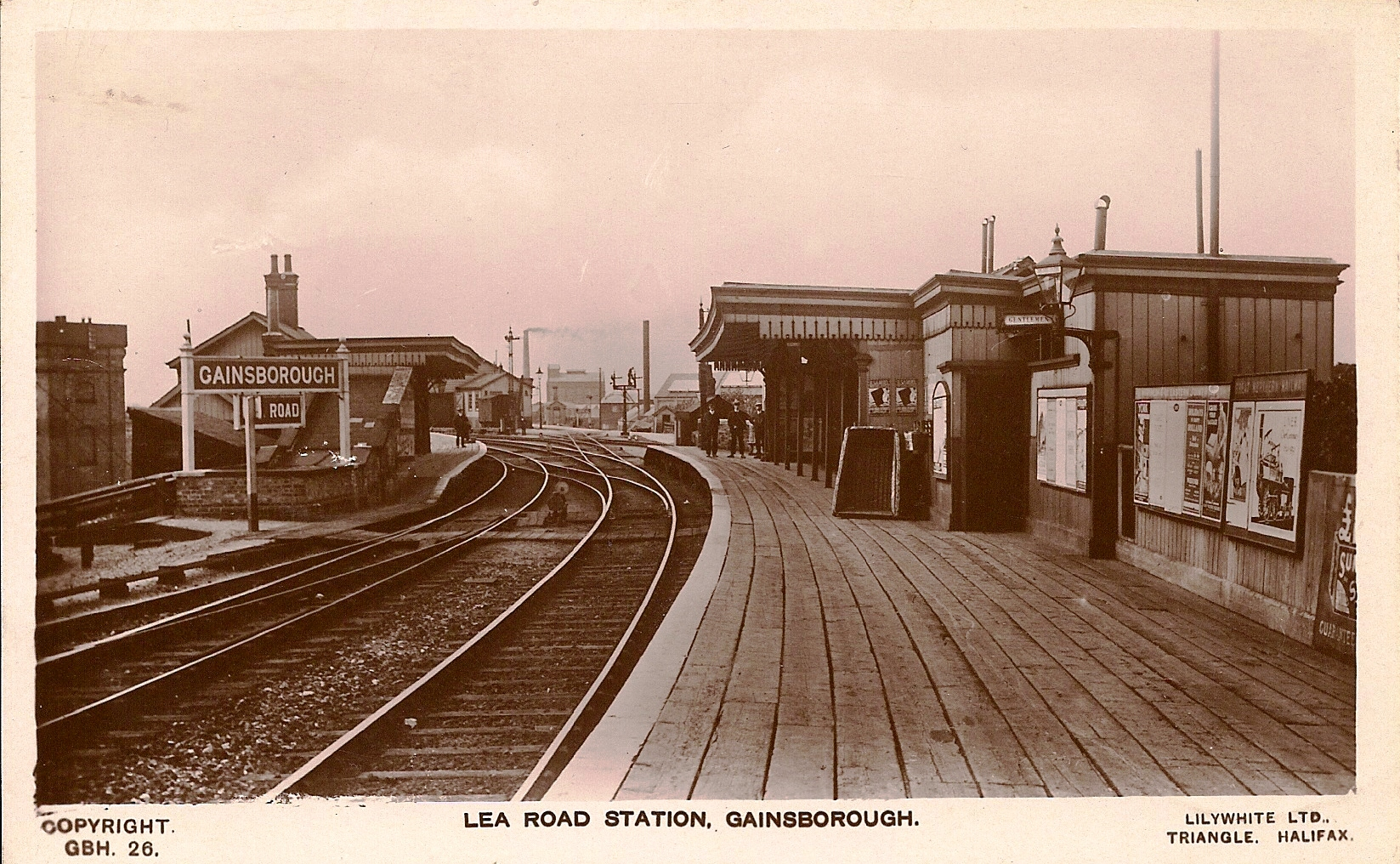
Gainsborough Lea Road railway station

On the opening throughout of the Joint Line, the Great Eastern Railway ran special racegoers' trains to Doncaster for the St Leger, including one from London Liverpool Street. The GNR had not anticipated this in the first year. When the GER publicised their intention to run a special from Liverpool Street to Doncaster for the Doncaster Cup on the following Friday in addition, the GNR felt obliged to run a special of its own from London King's Cross, something it did not customarily do. In fact the Friday services were poorly patronised: 12 persons used the GNR train, and six the GER train.

From 1 September 1882 the GER ran three trains a day between Liverpool Street and Doncaster via Cambridge and the Joint Line, augmenting the through London coaches attached to certain ordinary March to Doncaster trains. From 1 November 1892, running powers over the North Eastern Railway from Shaftholme Junction (the boundary of GNR and NER territory) to York were obtained, and the Liverpool Street trains were extended to York. This established the "Cathedrals Route" connecting Ely, Lincoln and York, but Gordon says that at 214 miles (344 km) the service provided "rather ineffectual competition with the GNR's 188 miles [303 km] from King's Cross". The service remained at three per day until July 1915 when it was reduced to one a day, and further shortened back to Doncaster in 1917, and abolished in 1918. "There was never more than a fragmentary reinstatement of this service."

In 1885 the GER started a through service from Harwich, Parkeston Quay, to Doncaster, by way of Ely, and March "in connection with their Hook of Holland route to the continent. In 1891 the service was improved by the running of a vestibuled Restaurant Car Train". "This train, splendidly equipped with restaurant cars, and carrying its own conductor-interpreter, runs in conjunction with the Great Eastern steamers which sail to and from the Hook of Holland."

Another famous train that used the route for many of the years was the North Country Continental which linked Harwich Parkeston Quay with Manchester and north west England.

In 1905 a through restaurant car service was inaugurated between Manchester London Road and Great Yarmouth by way of Retford, Lincoln, March and Ely, by arrangement with the Great Central Railway.

The bulk of services were local and in July 1922 the Bradshaw's timetable guide revealed few passenger services serving the smaller intermediate stations during the week. The North Country Continental served March, Spalding and Lincoln on the route and a service from Lowestoft to York served March, Spalding, Lincoln, Gainsborough and Doncaster. A Liverpool Street to Doncaster service also called at these stations. Most of the minor stations had three or four services each way.

On Sundays, minor stations between March and Lincoln had no services and there was a single northbound express. There was a single all stations train from Lincoln to Doncaster.

The Midland Railway ran trains from Kettering to Cambridge over the Huntingdon to St Ives section, by virtue of running powers arranged with the GER prior to the formation of the Joint Line.

=== Goods traffic ===
The line passed through terrain that was largely rural and sparsely inhabited. Accordingly, local goods traffic was not significant, although the arable agricultural sector provided a seasonal flow. The dominant goods traffic was naturally mineral trains, chiefly coal, from South Yorkshire, and later Lancashire, Derbyshire and Nottinghamshire. Much of this traffic was destined for London and the Home Counties, and domestic coal and coal for manufacturing power systems was significant at least up until the 1950s. Significant flows also ran to East Anglian destinations, and the export coal trade was also important until the 1950s. In addition, manufactured goods and the raw materials for them provided a significant long distance flow between London and East Anglia on the one hand, and Yorkshire, Lancashire and the east and north Midlands on the other.

The GER introduced its first fitted fast freight trains (Note: At this time goods wagons did not generally have brakes controlled from the locomotive, and accordingly they ran at slow speed. By fitting the wagons with through-controlled brakes, and making other technical improvements, faster running was possible, enabling much better transit times.) in 1906; they ran twice daily over the joint line, and were limited to 25 wagons.

In 1910 Charles Dix described the goods traffic at March:

Here the ordinary goods and merchandise traffic from London and the South, and the flower and fruit and other traffic from the Eastern Counties is collected and sent northwards, and similarly the traffic from the North, the textile and staple manufactures from Lancashire and Yorkshire and fish traffic from the north-eastern ports is collected for distribution to the South and over the Eastern Counties, eight express goods trains being scheduled to run daily each way between March and Doncaster for the purpose. Of the first importance is, of course, the enormous development of coal traffic from the South Yorkshire and Derbyshire coalfields, no less than 11 scheduled coal trains working to March over the joint line daily, besides seven daily mixed goods and coal trains and special and relief trains not scheduled, and the maximum load per train being 45 wagons. Another class of traffic which illustrates the industrial development due to the Great Eastern Railway's passage over the joint line is the fruit and flower traffic of Cambridgeshire and the Eastern Counties. During the period between May and October, 1909, no less than 13,000 tons of fruit were despatched to various towns in the North of England, 60,000 packages being despatched on one day from one station alone. A large portion of the fruit and flower traffic is conveyed by passenger train.

Dix reported "About 750 men are employed at [March] station, and... about 300 trains pass through or leave the station daily, 100 engines being stabled at March... Another class of traffic... is the fruit and flower traffic of Cambridgeshire and the Eastern Counties. During the period between May and October 1909, no less than 13,000 tons of fruit were despatched to various towns in the North of England, 60,000 packages being despatched on one day from one station alone."

There was also a steady flow of grain to distilleries in Scotland.

=== Whitemoor yard ===
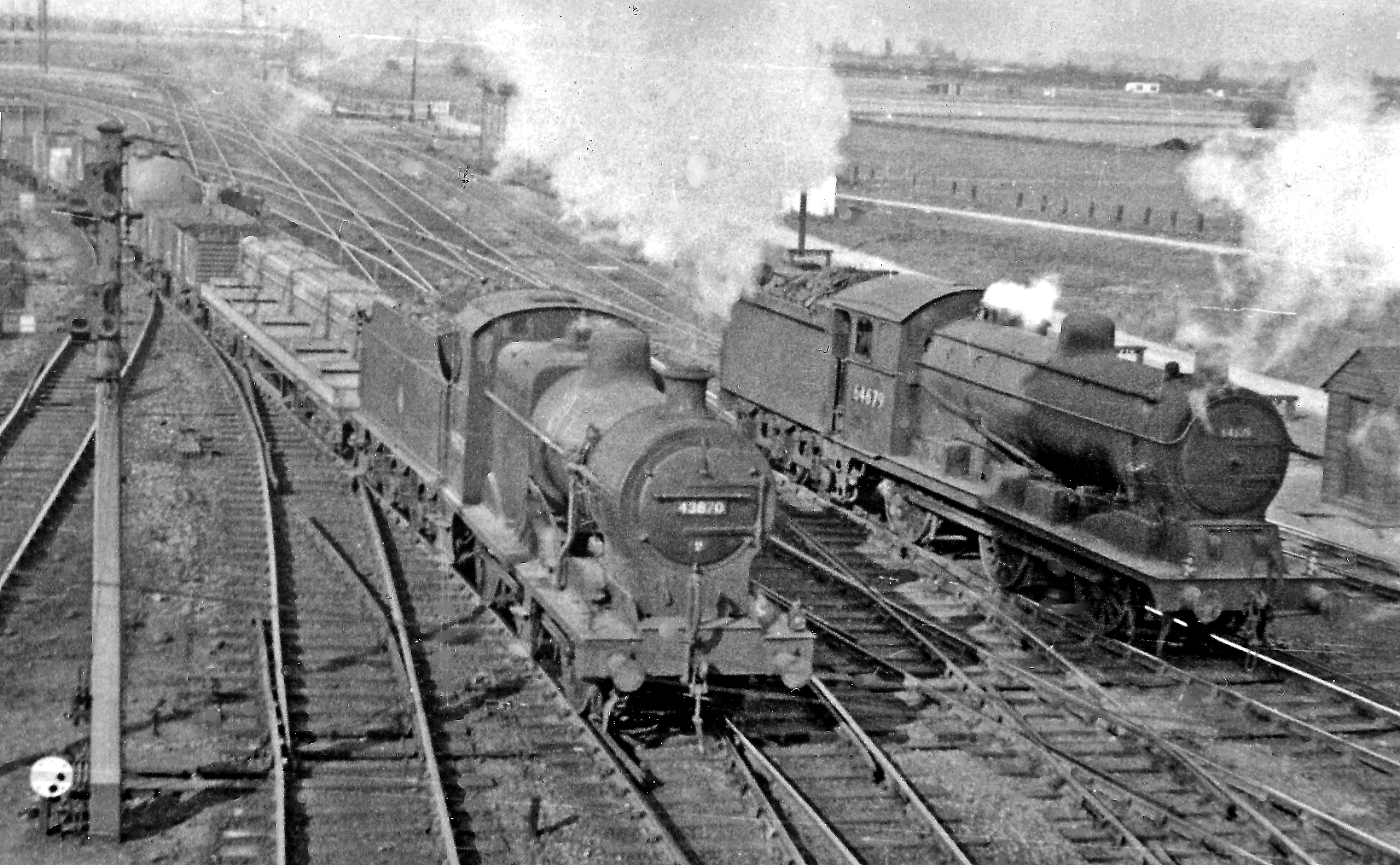
Goods trains at Whitemoor Junction

March had become a major sorting point for goods traffic coming south, as mineral and goods traffic from northern originating points needed to be allocated to onward services to London, to East Anglian destinations, to the docks, and elsewhere. In addition locally-originating sugar beet traffic was becoming significant. So far as the GER was concerned, March was the pivot of the system for traffic to and from the North and Midlands. In 1906 Dix reported that "the traffic [was] worked into the Whitemoor marshalling yard, and station yards which have been recently added to by the provision of a new up yard capable of holding 1,500 wagons."

In 1910 the yard held 1,500 wagons and 100 steam engines were based there.

The Whitemoor yards, chiefly Norwood Yard, extended from Grassmoor Junction at the north end, but in 1929 when the new Up Yard opened, it was extended northwards and Twenty Foot River became the northern limit. The yard covered 68 acres (28 ha) and contained 50 miles (80 km) of track. The new Down Yard opened in 1931. Whitemoor Up Yard was the first mechanised hump yard in Great Britain, equipped with retarders; similar equipment was later fitted in the Down Yard, but Norwood Yard remained a flat yard.

Railway Magazine explained:

The installation of these "rail brakes" or wagon retarders is an innovation in British railway practice... Under this system the wheels of the wagon to be checked are squeezed between pairs of rails which press against the sides of the wheels. The pressure can be intensified or diminished as required. In all, four sets of brakes controlled from a central tower are being fitted.

=== Grouping of the railways ===
In 1923 most of the main line railways of Great Britain were reorganised into one or other of four new large companies by order of the Government, under the Railways Act 1921. Both the Great Northern Railway and the Great Eastern Railway were constituents of the new London and North Eastern Railway (LNER), and accordingly they were part of the same organisational unit. The joint railway structure was therefore no longer necessary, and it was abolished. The Joint Line was still known as such for convenience.

=== Decline ===
The intermediate and local traffic had always been very limited, because of the low population density and comparative lack of industrialisation in the area served, particularly south of Lincoln. Inevitably therefore passenger and goods business from local stations was disappointing. On 22 September 1930 the passenger service on the Ramsey branch was closed. A goods service continued for the time being, but the branch was closed to all traffic on 13 July 1964.

In 1953 Guyhirne and Murrow stations were closed to passengers. Other intermediate stations closed to passengers on 11 September 1961 and to goods four years later.

The Midland and Great Northern Joint Railway was closed in 1959, and a connecting spur was laid at Murrow, where the two routes had intersected, to allow the remaining goods traffic from the Eye Green brickworks to reach the Joint Line. This traffic continued until July 1966, when it was discontinued.

=== Route closures ===
Following World War II, demand for domestic and industrial coal in the London area declined, and was accelerated by the Clean Air Act 1956. The part of the Joint Line south of Lincoln declined steeply, never having had much passenger traffic other than seasonal holiday trains connecting northern cities to the Norfolk and Suffolk resorts. The St Ives and Huntingdon line had rarely had other than local traffic, and that too had reduced greatly in volume. The passenger service between Huntingdon and St Ives closed on 15 June 1959, and the line closed completely in 1969.

By the 1960s it was obvious that the route between March and Cambridge via St Ives was losing money, and local traffic was insignificant. The March to St Ives line was closed on 6 March 1967. The St Ives to Cambridge section was closed to passenger traffic in 1970, but sand traffic from Fen Drayton continued to be carried until 1992. Most of that route has been converted into part of the Cambridgeshire Guided Busway, opening in 2011.

In 1975 the stations at Metheringham and Ruskington were re-opened, following a local authority initiative.

Declining goods traffic and the considerable expense of operating the line, which had numerous level crossings, led to the line between Spalding and Whitemoor (March) being closed in 1982. £4 million in track renewals were to be avoided by the closure. The passenger service was withdrawn on 29 November 1982, a month later than originally planned, due to industrial relations difficulties.

The considerable reduction in freight traffic resulted in the closure of the Lincoln avoiding line in October 1983. There had been a second passenger station in Lincoln, St Marks, originally the Midland's station, and it was later closed, in 1985. To enable trains from the Newark direction, which had previously used St Marks, to reach the former GNR station, a new curve was made from the approaching line to the former avoiding line, and the trains used the former curve from Boultham Junction to Holmes West Junction. The remainder of the avoiding line remained closed.

As goods began to be conveyed in trainloads, the use of Whitemoor for wagon sorting declined, from the 1970s: the Down Yard was closed on 27 January 1972. The Whitemoor complex became a Freightliner centre for a while, but by 1992 that too had been closed and a small wagon repair facility was all that remained. Such freight sorting that was required was done in sidings to the east of the station.

=== Freight upgrade ===
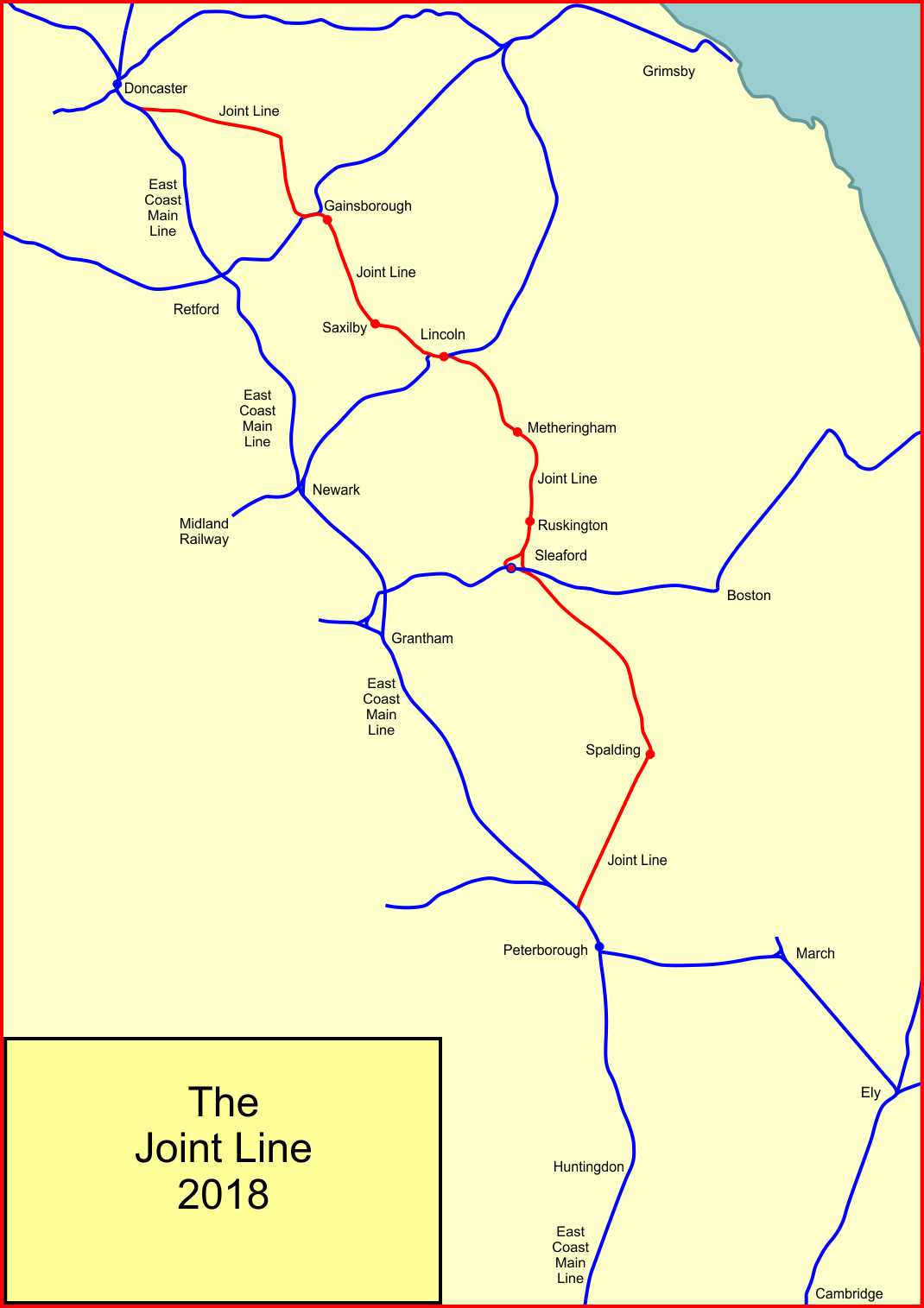
The Joint Line in 2018

In 2015 a £280 million upgrade of the Joint Line by Network Rail was substantially complete, enabling two freight trains per hour to be diverted from the congested East Coast Main Line; gauge enhancements to enable the passage of 9 ft 6 in (2.90 m) containers were included in the work.

The Sleaford avoiding line had been substantially downgraded since the 1980s and was reinstated to double track as part of the 2015 scheme. Resignalling and modernisation of level crossings was included.

=== Current passenger service ===
Currently (December 2019) passenger train services on the route are run by East Midlands Trains between Peterborough and Doncaster, though not all services run the whole length of the route. There is a roughly hourly service between Peterborough and Lincoln calling at Spalding, Sleaford, Ruskington and Metheringham. There are also few services that link Sleaford to Doncaster. Northern operates an all-stations service between Lincoln and Sheffield, which calls at Saxilby and Gainsborough Lea Road, diverging from the Joint Line there. LNER operate five trains a day between London King's Cross and Lincoln, four of them using the Joint Line between Peterborough and Lincoln. Later services still run on the other parts of the line. Sunday services are limited to afternoon trains from Lincoln to Sheffield.

== Engine sheds ==
The following engine sheds were located along the route and are described north to south.

- Doncaster: The GER initially shared with the GNR but between 1893 and 1923 occupied the London and North Western Railway shed. In January 1923 with the grouping the former GER engines moved back to the GNR establishment.
- Pyewipe Junction: A Great Eastern shed was located at this location. The depot closed in 1924 and was merged with the Great Northern establishment in the city although locomotives were stabled there for some time after.
- Lincoln: The engine shed at Lincoln was originally constructed in 1874 for the GNR and was closed in 1964. When Pyewipe Junction engine shed was closed the staff and locomotives were transferred here. The building now houses the Engine Shed Theatre.
- March: March depot was an important engine shed located adjacent to Whitemoor marshalling yard. It had a significant allocation of freight engines both in GER, LNER and British Rail days. The depot survived the closure of the Spalding–March line in the 1980s, but it closed in 1992.
- Cambridge: Cambridge engine shed was a major shed on the Great Eastern Railway which supplied engines for some Joint Line services.

== Route ==
The Joint Line originally ran from Huntingdon to Black Carr Junction, Doncaster, and the Ramsey branch was soon added. When the section from March to Spalding was closed, the southern end of the route was altered to be that joining the East Coast Main Line at Werrington Junction, north of Peterborough, so that colloquially the term "The Joint Line" now refers to the route from Peterborough to Doncaster through Spalding, Sleaford, Lincoln and Gainsborough.

Location list:

=== Huntingdon to St Ives ===
- Huntingdon GE and Midland Railway Joint Station; opened 1 May 1883; renamed Huntingdon East 1923; closed 18 September 1959;
- Huntingdon; opened 17 August 1847; renamed Godmanchester 1882; closed 15 June 1959;
- St Ives; opened 17 March 1847; closed 5 October 1970.

=== St Ives to Black Carr Junction (Doncaster) ===
- St Ives; above; Great Eastern Railway metals for 1 mile 68 chains (2.98 km);
- Needingworth Junction; Joint Line commences;
- Somersham; opened 1 March 1848; closed 6 March 1967;
- Chatteris; opened 1 March 1848; closed 6 March 1967;
- Wimblington; opened 1 March 1848; closed 6 March 1967;
- March South Junction or March St Ives Junction; GER route onwards 1 mile 79 chains (3.20 km);
- March; opened 14 January 1847; still open;
- Whitemoor Yard;
- Grassmoor Junction; Joint Line resumes;
- Guyhirne; opened 2 September 1867; closed 5 October 1953;
- Murrow; opened 2 September 1867; renamed Murrow West 1948; closed 6 July 1953;
- French Drove; opened 2 September 1867; renamed French Drove and Gedney Hill 1938; closed 11 September 1961;
- Crowland; opened 2 September 1867; renamed Postland 1871; closed 11 September 1961;
- Cowbit; opened 2 September 1867; closed 11 September 1961;
- Spalding Joint Line Junction; GN route onwards for 45 chains (0.91 km);
- Spalding; opened 17 October 1848; still open;
- Spalding North Junction; Joint Line resumes;
- Pinchbeck; opened 6 March 1882; closed 11 September 1961;
- Gosberton; opened 6 March 1882; closed 11 September 1961;
- Donington Road; opened 6 March 1882; closed 11 September 1961;
- Helpringham; opened 6 March 1882; closed 4 July 1955;
- Sleaford South Junction; there was a 39-chain (0.78 km) Joint Line (Note: Angloscot's exhaustive and detailed list says that this spur was owned by the GNR.) spur towards Sleaford GNR station;
- Sleaford North Junction; there was a connecting line from Sleaford GNR station, 1 mile 35 chains (2.31 km);
- Ruskington; opened 6 March 1882; closed 11 September 1961; reopened 5 May 1975; still open;
- Digby; opened 1 August 1882; closed 11 September 1961;
- Scopwick and Timberland; opened 1 August 1882; closed 7 November 1955;
- Blankney and Metheringham; opened 1 August 1882; closed 11 September 1961; reopened as Metheringham 6 October 1975; still open;
- Nocton and Dunston; opened 1 August 1882; closed 2 May 1955;
- Potterhanworth; opened 1 August 1882; closed 2 May 1955;
- Heighington; opened 1 August 1882; renamed Branston and Heighington 1884; closed 3 November 1958;
- Greetwell Junction; there was a Joint Line connection to Sincil Bank Junction, close to Lincoln GNR station;
- Boultham Junction; there was a spur connection towards West Holmes Junction for GNR goods and passenger stations;
- Pyewipe Junction; convergence with GNR main line from Lincoln station;
- Skellingthorpe; opened 2 January 1865; closed 1 June 1868;
- Saxilby; opened 9 April 1849; still open;
- Sykes Junction;
- Marton; opened 9 April 1849; closed 1 December 1864; reopened 15 July 1867; renamed Stow Park 1 December 1871; closed 11 September 1961;
- Lea; opened 1 August 1849; closed 1 December 1864; reopened 15 July 1867; closed 6 August 1957;
- Gainsborough; opened 15 July 1867; renamed Gainsborough North 1923; renamed Gainsborough Lea Road 1923; still open;
- Gainsborough South Junction;
- Gainsborough North Junction (or Trent Junction);
- Beckingham; opened 15 July 1867; closed 2 November 1959;
- Walkeringham; opened 15 July 1867; closed 2 February 1959;
- Misterton; opened 15 July 1867; closed 11 September 1961;
- Haxey and Epworth; opened 9 July 1867: closed 2 February 1959:
- Park Drain; opened 2 March 1896; closed 7 February 1955;
- Finningley; opened 15 July 1867; closed 11 September 1961; later use for excursions;
- Bessacarr Halt; for golfers; opened 1912; closed 1914 or 1924 (Scowcroft);
- Bessacarr Junction;
- Black Carr Junction.

=== Ramsey branch ===
- Ramsey High Street; opened 16 September 1889; renamed Ramsey East 1923; closed 22 September 1930; excursions were occasionally started from here after closure;
- Warboys; opened 16 September 1889; closed 22 September 1930;
- Somersham; above.

The total mileage controlled by the Joint Committee was 122 miles 60 chains (197.55 km); in addition the Joint Committee had running powers over 6 miles 16 chains (9.98 km) of GNR line and 3 miles 74 chains (6.32 km) of GER route. It also had running powers over 14 chains (0.28 km) of Great Central Railway metals (at Gainsborough).

At Murrow there was a flat crossing of the Midland and Great Northern Railway; this was the only location in the country where a flat crossing between two jointly managed railways existed. When the Midland and Great Northern Joint Railway closed on 2 March 1959, a south to west spur was installed to maintain goods train access to brickworks at Eye Green and Dogsthorpe, nearer Peterborough, and to Wisbech Harbour. This traffic ceased and the connection was removed on 20 July 1966.

The section of line between St Ives and Cambridge was used for the construction of the first part of Cambridgeshire Guided Busway.

=== Signal boxes ===
The signal boxes between Doncaster and Lincoln were built to a Great Northern design.

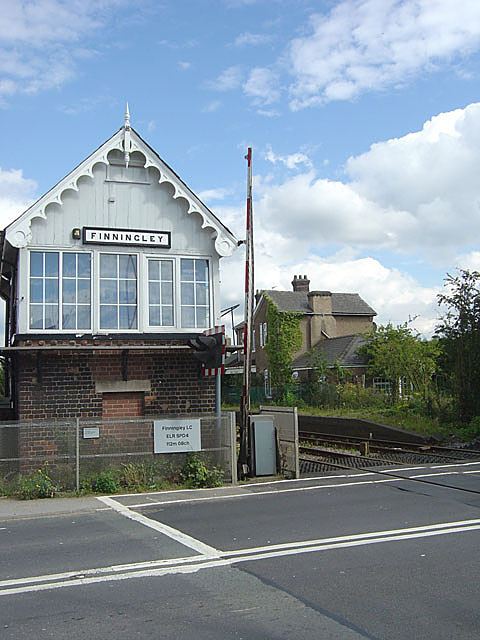
Finningley Signal Box between Lincoln and Doncaster. Note remains of closed station in background.

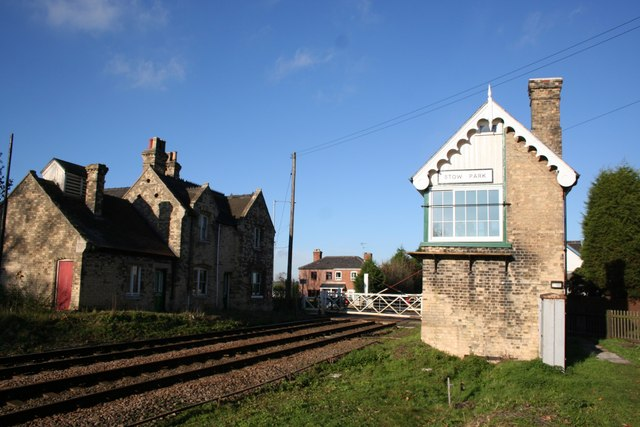
Stow Park level crossing, signal box and closed station. 2006.

These are some pictures of signalboxes built on the 1882 section of line between Spalding and Lincoln which were built to a Great Eastern design.

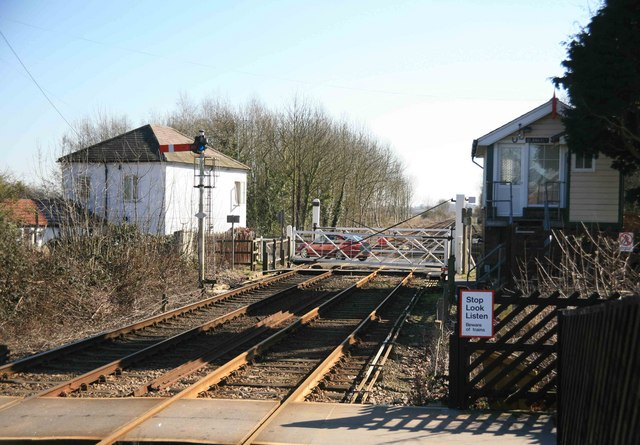
Metheringham Crossing and signal box pictured in 2010. Note semaphore signal.

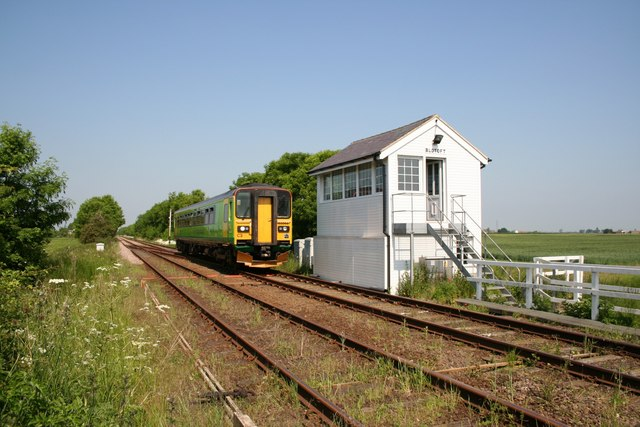
Blotoft signal box (Helpringham)with a Class 153 unit passing.

Network Rail resignalled the line in 2013–14 and this saw the old signal boxes and semaphore signalling removed. The line is now controlled from Lincoln Signalling Control Centre.

== Rolling stock ==
=== Pre-grouping ===
During the First World War, six former Railway Operating Division (built for military use in wartime overseas) 2-8-0 locomotives were allocated to Pyewipe Junction engine shed for work on the Joint Line and a further nine at Doncaster.

=== LNER ===
In 1923 the following locomotive classes were allocated to the Great Eastern sheds at Doncaster, Pyewipe Junction and March. It can be assumed most of these locomotives other than Great Northern 4-6-2 and 4-4-2 classes worked over the line. These would have been more typically employed on the East Coast Main Line but may have occasionally worked the Joint Line.

Class	Wheel arrangement	Railway	Number at Doncaster	Number at Pyewipe	Number at March
D13	4-4-0	GER	3	3	6
D14	4-4-0	GER	0	0	1
D15	4-4-0	GER	1	0	4
E4	2-4-0	GER	1	0	4
J14	0-6-0	GER	0	0	1
J15	0-6-0	GER	0	3	17
J16	0-6-0	GER	0	1	7
J17	0-6-0	GER	0	2	15
J18	0-6-0	GER	0	0	7
J19	0-6-0	GER	0	0	8
J20	0-6-0	GER	0	0	14
J66	0-6-0T	GER	0	3	10
J67	0-6-0T	GER	0	0	1
J68	0-6-0T	GER	0	0	1
J69	0-6-0T	GER	0	0	1

In 1923 the following locomotives were allocated to the Great Northern sheds at Doncaster and Lincoln.

Class	Wheel arrangement	Railway	Number at Doncaster	Number at Lincoln
A1	4-6-2	GNR	3	0
C1	4-4-2	GNR	25	0
C2	4-4-2	GNR	4	0
C12	4-4-2T	GNR	0	1
D2	4-4-0	GNR	11	4
D3	4-4-0	GNR	6	1
D4	4-4-0	GNR	0	1
J2	0-6-0	GNR	1	0
J3	0-6-0	GNR	18	1
J4	0-6-0	GNR	24	9
J5	0-6-0	GNR	6	0
J6	0-6-0	GNR	22	0
J52	0-6-0T	GNR	25	2
J53	0-6-0T	GNR	4	3
J54	0-6-0T	GNR	8	3
J55	0-6-0T	GNR	5	2
J56	0-6-0T	GNR	1	1
J57	0-6-0T	GNR	1	0

Locomotives from the GNR sheds at Boston, Retford, New England (Peterborough) and Grantham would have all been seen on the line in the Spalding and Sleaford areas with some reaching March.

In 1923 Great Central Railway locomotives from Lincoln (GCR) shed would have been seen in that area as would those from Tuxford engine shed.

=== British Rail ===
In BR days locomotives of the following classes are known to have worked the line:

- Class 25
- Class 31
- Class 37
- Class 40
- Class 47
- Class 56
- Class 58
- Class 60

Photographs of diesel locomotives between Spalding and March can be found. whilst photographs of diesel locomotives between March and Cambridge can be found here.

=== Post-privatisation ===
Since privatisation, class 66 locomotives work most freight services. This primarily consists of coal trains between Lincoln, Gainsborough and Doncaster with imported coal for power stations. Some container traffic and oil traffic is routed this way but little traffic is routed south of Lincoln. The March–Spalding line is (2018) listed by the Campaign for Better Transport as one of 294 lines they believe should be reopened.

== See also ==
- Lincolnshire lines of the Great Northern Railway
