= Potterhanworth railway station =

Former railway station in Lincolnshire, England

Potterhanworth
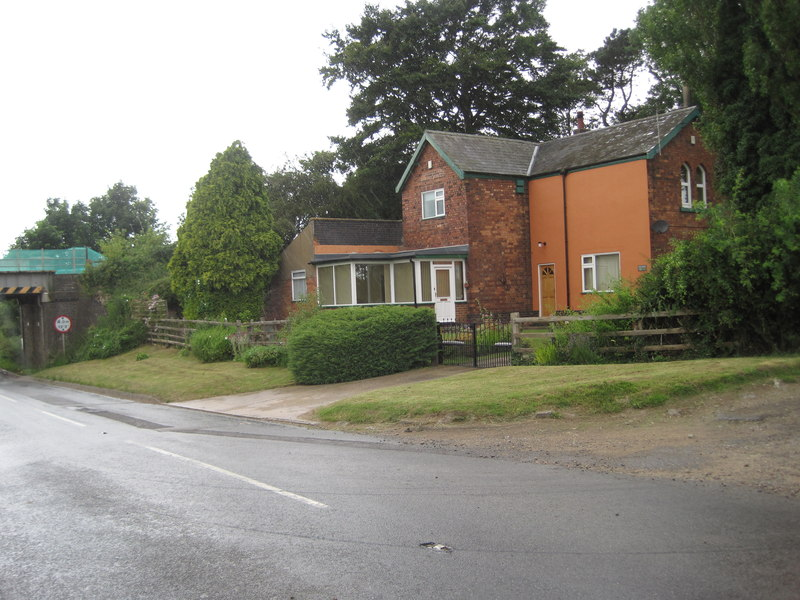
- The station house in 2012

General information
- Location: Potterhanworth, North Kesteven; England
- Coordinates: 53.183°N 0.437°W
- Grid reference: TF045661
- Platforms: 2

Other information
- Status: Disused

History
- Original company: Great Northern and Great Eastern Joint Railway
- Post-grouping: LNER; British Railways (North Eastern)

Key dates
- 1 August 1882: Station opened
- 2 May 1955: Station closed for passengers
- 15 June 1964: closed for freight
Location

Potterhanworth railway station is a former railway station in Potterhanworth, Lincolnshire. It was on the still-open line between Lincoln and Sleaford.

Former Services

Preceding station	Historical railways	Following station
Branston and Heighington Line open, station closed	Great Northern and Great Eastern Joint Railway	Nocton and Dunston Line open, station closed
