= Cranwell branch =

Overview
- Locale: Lincolnshire, England

History
- Opened: 1917
- Closed: 1956

Technical
- Line length: 5.2 mi (8.4 km)
- Number of tracks: single track
- Track gauge: 4 ft 8 1/2 in (1,435 mm) standard gauge
Route map
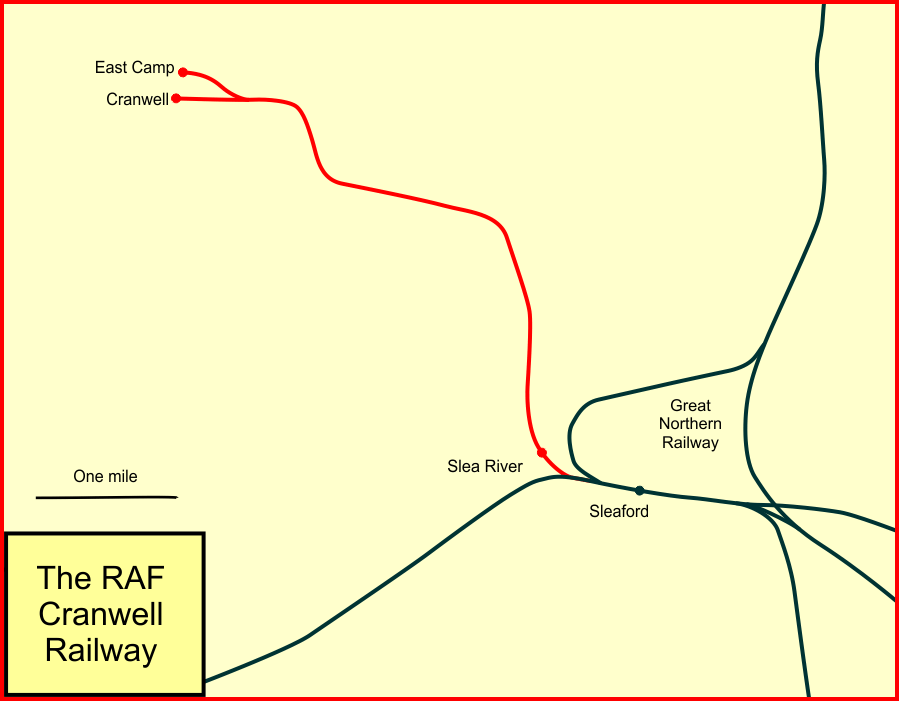
The Cranwell branch line

The Cranwell branch was a military branch line railway in Lincolnshire, England. It connected the Royal Naval Air Station (RNAS) at Cranwell to the main line at Sleaford. It opened in 1917 from Sleaford railway station and it joined the Great Northern Railway. RNAS Cranwell was intended for training pilots and aircrew during the First World War. Control soon passed to the Royal Air Force in 1918, and the location became known as RAF Cranwell.

A public passenger service was operated from the outset, and there were three stations on the branch. The passenger service was loss-making and it closed in November 1926, but the goods service on the line continued until closure in 1956.

== A new military base ==
In the early part of the First World War the British Admiralty were seeking a location for an airfield to train naval pilots. In 1915 the Aerodrome Selection Committee identified a "large stretch of flat country on top of the heath above Caythorpe". The location was near Cranwell, and was quickly selected. The Admiralty took possession of Cranwell Lodge Farm, which was the majority of the land required, on 23 November 1915. The location was to become the Royal Naval Air Service Training Establishment, Cranwell. The naval personnel were held on the books of HMS Daedalus, a hulk moored on the River Medway. Many sources assert that the RNAS was itself named HMS Daedalus.

Construction of the accommodation for servicemen and aircraft soon started: a considerable quantity of materials needed to be brought to the location, and at the time public roads were barely adequate. The winter of 1915-1916 was hard, and transport by road to the site for construction proved very difficult. A temporary railway track was laid by the contractor; it was laid directly on the ground without any attempt at earthworks. The gradients were so severe that two locomotives were needed to pull five loaded wagons, and the line was nicknamed "the switchback".

== A proper railway ==
It was decided to provide a proper railway on a permanent basis using the alignment adopted by the contractor but improving it for full railway usage, for both goods and passenger operation. The Admiralty wrote to the Board of Trade on 6 March 1916 stating that a passenger railway was to be provided to the new establishment, and an inspecting officer, Col Druitt, visited on 20 March 1916.

Druitt advised that if passenger trains were to be run, a speed limit of 15 mph ought to be enforced. This should be reducing to 3/4 mph over the underbridges, which should, he advised, be inspected every morning in case of malicious damage. Continuous brakes would be required on passenger trains. Having accepted the possibility of opening to passenger trains subject to these conditions, he appears to have had second thoughts later, and in his written report of 22 March he refused to pass the line for passenger operation.

The Admiralty replied on 16 April 1916, saying that in view of the wartime emergency, it would be inappropriate to insist on peacetime safety measures. "Risks must be taken in wartime and work must not be held up in waiting for obligatory peacetime safeguards to be applied." The Board of Trade replied that they had no jurisdiction in the matter, and the Admiralty would have full responsibility for the operation of what amounted to a military railway.

Construction started, and the Great Northern Railway took responsibility for the engineering of the new line: it was to be a little over five miles in length. They employed the contractor Logan and Hemingway, who had quoted £31,316 for the work. Construction started in the late summer of 1916, and was finished at the end of 1917. There were 1 in 50 gradients, rising from the Slea River crossing and both sides of the Leasingham decline.

== Opening ==
The branch diverged from the existing railway network near Sleaford, and Sleaford West signalbox was extended to control the new junction. There were exchange sidings at the junction. The new arrangement was operational in March 1918 but the branch line was not completed fully until February 1919. There were various temporary branches off the main line to suit construction requirements. Gradients were mostly rising towards Cranwell, with a ruling gradient 1 in 50, but there was a fall of 1 in 60 in addition.

Passenger services were run from the opening of the line. (Note: Butt quotes the opening as January 1917 and names the terminal station as Cranwell RAF. At January 1917 the base was still a Royal Naval Air Station, and it did not become an RAF station in January 1918. Moreover Butt quotes the closure to passengers as August 1956. That is the date of closure of the goods service; the passenger service ceased in November 1926.) In early timetables there were seven passenger trains each way daily, and there was a Sunday service in addition. The Admiralty paid the Great Northern Railway £500 annually for the use of Sleaford station, used by the branch passenger trains. There were three passenger stations on the branch: Slea River, not far from the junction with the GNR line, Cranwell, and East Camp. One of the passenger services from Cranwell terminated at Slea River while the engine performed goods shunting duties, and the next train to Cranwell started from that point.

== Closure ==
In the 1920s competition from bus services locally hit the branch usage hard, and from November 1926 the passenger service on the branch was closed. From that time the branch goods trains did not run beyond the exchange sidings at Sleaford West Junction.

After the Second World War the requirement for the branch declined further and it was closed in August 1956. The track was removed in October 1957.

== Profitability ==
In regards to finance, the line never broke even: in response to a Parliamentary Question, it was revealed that, even allowing for a credit in respect of the c.15,000 tons of Government stores that were transported along it during 1924, the line still made a loss of £3,570. After coming under repeated pressure to reduce the deficit, the line ceased to carry regular passenger traffic in November 1926, with a consequent reduction in running costs. Its original use, for the conveyance of materials and provisions to the training establishment at Cranwell continued, however, together with the occasional passenger train (such as the special trains bringing public schoolboys to visit the college in the 1930s, the first Canadian contingent to arrive in the Second World War and the 1953 Flying Training Command Coronation contingent, which was pulled by a British Railways J6 class 0-6-0 tender engine with another of the Class on the rear).

== Rolling stock ==
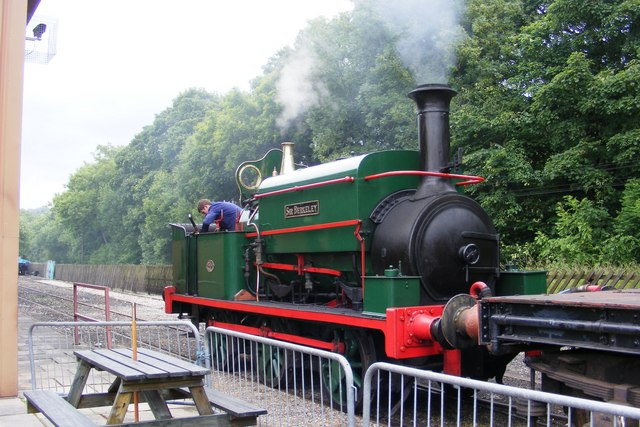
Locomotive "Sir Berkeley", which was very similar to the locomotives used on the Cranwell Branch, in steam at Ingrow West on the Keighley & Worth Valley Railway.

Five locomotives owned by the contractors Logan and Hemingway are known to have worked at Cranwell; these were all Manning Wardle 0-6-0 Saddle Tanks, with numbers: 3, 4 Epworth, 5, 7 Bletcher and 8.

A surviving Logan and Hemingway locomotive of the type used on the RAF Cranwell Railway (a 0-6-0 Manning Wardle saddle tank originally known as Number 10, but which now goes by the name of Sir Berkeley) is owned by the Vintage Carriages Trust.

Two diesel locomotives were tried out on the line after the Second World War but they were unsuccessful in view of the difficult gradients on the line.

Thirteen four-wheeled and six-wheeled passenger coaches were acquired for the passenger service. They were bought second-hand from the GNR before 1919, having been in use on the GNR Metropolitan Service between New Barnet and Moorgate. Eight coaches were usually sufficient on any train except on Saturdays when all thirteen were often used.

== Station building ==
The former Cranwell station building remains and is now a guardhouse.

The station at Slea River has been demolished and East Camp is occupied by residential estates for the soldiers based at RAF Cranwell.
