= Ruskington railway station =

Railway station in Lincolnshire, England

Ruskington
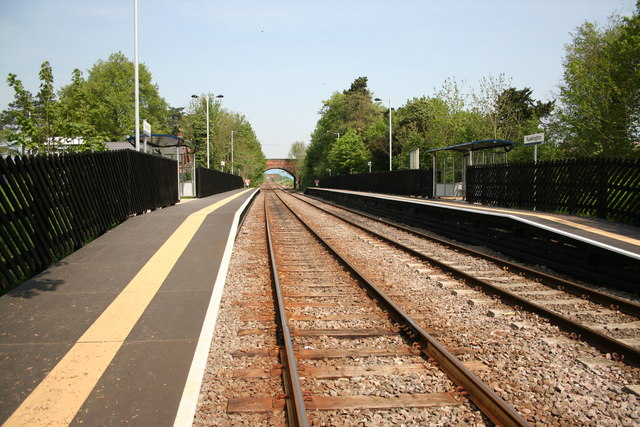

General information
- Location: Ruskington, North Kesteven; England
- Coordinates: 53.04143°N 0.38050°W
- Grid reference: TF086505
- Managed by: East Midlands Railway
- Platforms: 2

Other information
- Station code: RKT
- Classification: DfT category F2

Passengers
- 2020/21: ▼18,652
- 2021/22: ▲59,662
- 2022/23: ▲61,046
- 2023/24: ▼60,550
- 2024/25: ▲70,984
Location
Notes
- Passenger statistics from the Office of Rail and Road

Ruskington railway station serves the village of Ruskington in Lincolnshire, England. It opened in 1882 as part of the Great Northern and Great Eastern Joint Railway between Sleaford and Lincoln Central. It closed in 1961 but was reopened in 1975.

The station is now owned by Network Rail and managed by East Midlands Railway who provide all rail services.

The station is unstaffed and offers limited facilities other than free car parking, two shelters, bicycle storage, timetables and modern 'Help Points'. The full range of tickets for travel are purchased from the guard on the train, or an automatic ticket machine next to the cycle racks in the car park, on the Northbound side of the line, (Towards Lincoln.)

In 2014 work was undertaken to improve access at the station. This included the construction of new railway bridges and disabled access ramps to safely cross the lines. Previous access from one platform to the other was by crossing both railway lines.

== Services ==
All services at Ruskington are operated by East Midlands Railway.

On weekdays and Saturdays, the station is generally served by an hourly service northbound to Lincoln and southbound to Peterborough via Sleaford. Five trains per day are extended beyond Lincoln to Doncaster. The station is also served by a single daily service to and from Newark North Gate.

There is no Sunday service at the station.

Preceding station	National Rail	Following station
Metheringham	East Midlands Railway: Peterborough to Lincoln Line; Monday-Saturday only	Sleaford
	Historical railways	
Digby Line open, station closed	Great Northern and Great Eastern Joint Railway Peterborough to Lincoln Line	Sleaford Line and station open
