= Peterborough–Lincoln line =

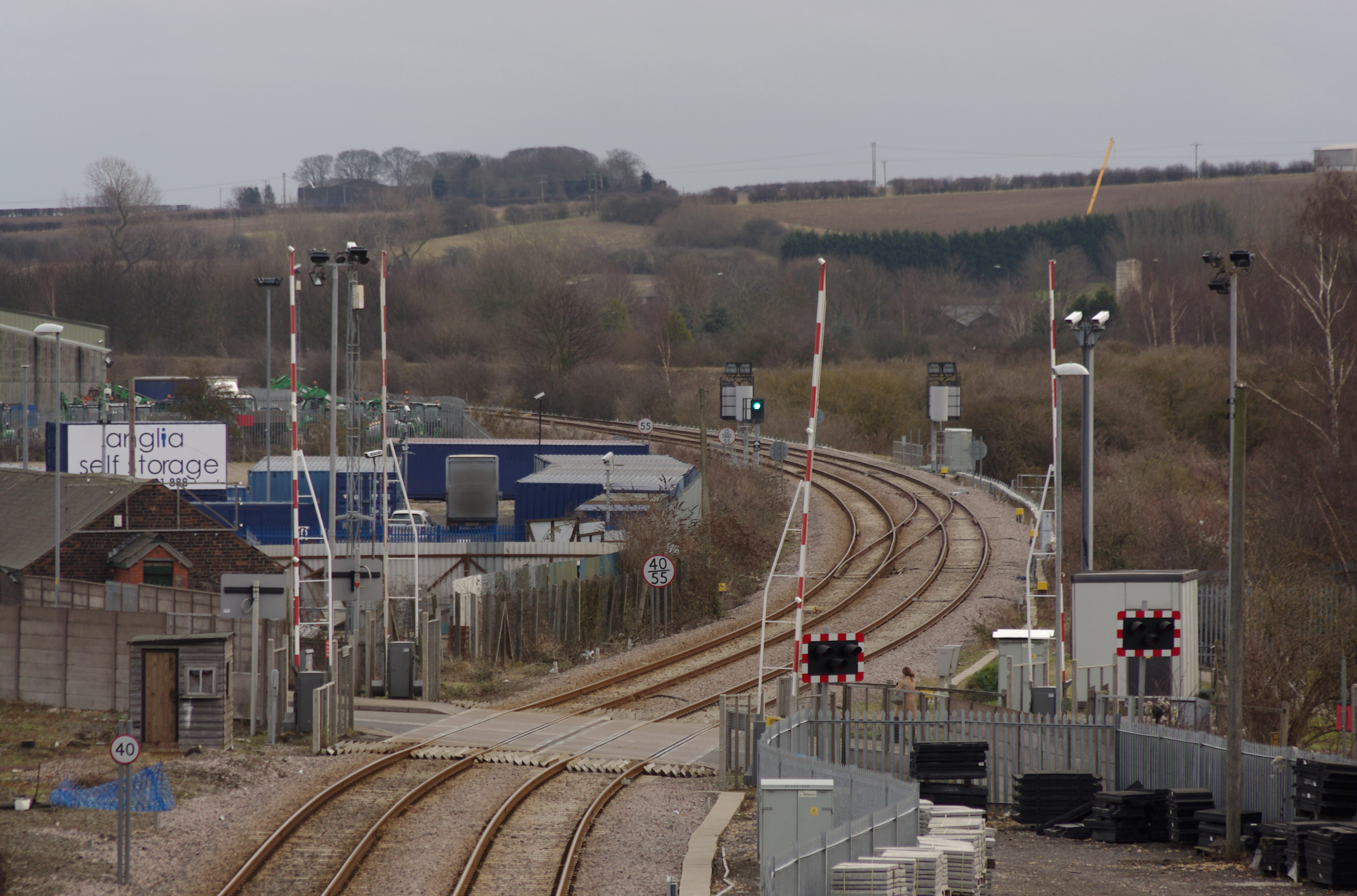
- The line heads away from Lincoln toward Sleaford

Overview
- Status: Operational
- Owner: Network Rail
- Locale: East Midlands
- Termini: Peterborough; Lincoln
- Stations: 6

Service
- Type: Heavy rail
- System: National Rail
- Operator(s): East Midlands Railway; London North Eastern Railway
- Rolling stock: Class 170 Turbostar; Class 158 Express Sprinter; Class 800 "Azuma"

Technical
- Line length: 24 mi (39 km)
- Number of tracks: Two
- Track gauge: 4 ft 8 1/2 in (1,435 mm) standard gauge
- Electrification: 25 kV AC OHLE (part of the ECML at Peterborough)
Route map
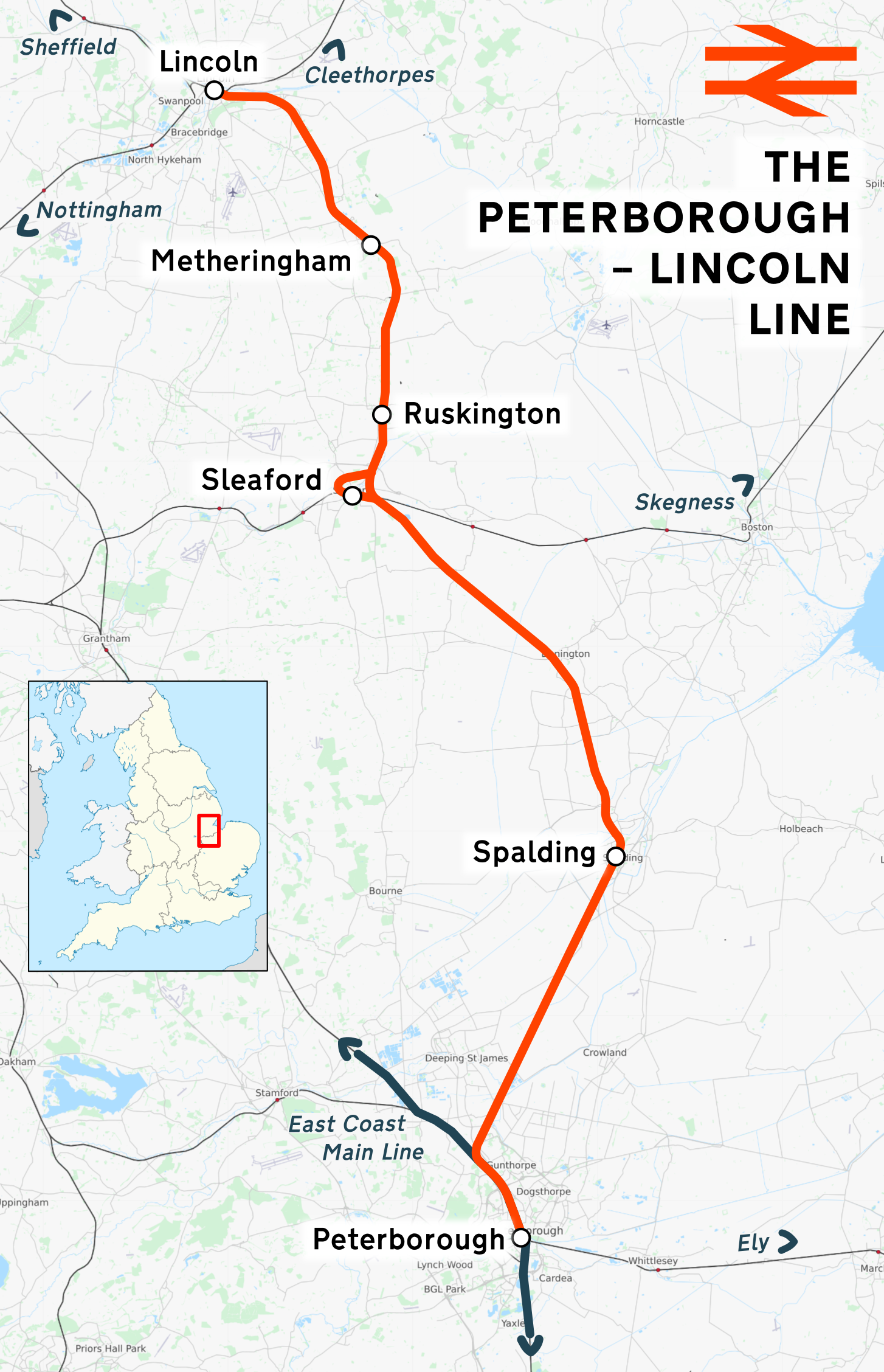
(Click to expand)

The Peterborough–Lincoln line is a railway line linking Peterborough and Lincoln, via Sleaford and Spalding. Between Lincoln and Spalding, the line follows the route of the former Great Northern and Great Eastern Joint Railway.

== History ==
The section between Peterborough and Spalding closed to passengers on 5 October 1970 and re-opened on 7 June 1971. North of Spalding, Ruskington re-opened on 5 May 1975, followed by Metheringham on 6 October 1975.

Intermediate stations south of Sleaford did not re-open (see diagram). There have been campaigns by local communities to re-open Littleworth on a park-and-ride basis for Peterborough. In 2016 this was costed at £4.3 million as it would need a footbridge and car parking availability.

Between 1848 and 1963, the Lincolnshire loop line ran from Spalding to Lincoln via Boston, Woodhall Junction and Bardney, where they connected to other branch lines, including the East Lincolnshire Railway, Kirkstead and Little Steeping Railway and the Horncastle Railway. The section between Lincoln and Boston closed to passengers in 1963. The route between Boston and Spalding closed in 1964. Only the section from Lincoln to Woodhall Junction which provided links to Horncastle and Firsby remained open until between 1970–1971 to both passengers and freight traffic. Today, the section from Lincoln to Woodhall Junction forms part of the Water Rail Way footpath and between Boston and Spalding. The trackbed has been converted to form part of the A16.

== Description ==
The towns and villages served by the route are listed below;

- Peterborough
- Spalding
- Sleaford
  - connections with Grantham–Skegness line
- Ruskington
- Metheringham
- Lincoln

After an upgrade in 2015, the route through to Lincoln (and beyond to Doncaster) has a regular role as a diversionary route for trains from the East Coast Main Line, primarily for slower freight services but occasionally for passenger trains too. As a result, the route is now open 24 hours per day. In September 2018 a new grade separated junction at Werrington was under construction to allow freight and passenger services to dive under the East Coast Main Line. It was opened in 2021.

== Infrastructure ==
The line is not electrified. The line is controlled by Lincoln signalling centre from Werrington Junction to Lincoln, worked under track circuit block regulations (TCB). However, Sleaford East box remains for now: re-signalling is due around 2019/2020, when the whole area will switch to York Rail Operating Centre (ROC) along with Lincoln signalling centre.

== Incidents ==
On 28 February 2002, one person died and thirty people were injured in the Nocton rail accident when a train hit a vehicle on the tracks at the site of a removed bridge.

On 6 December 2004, two people died in a collision between a car and a class 153 DMU on a user operated crossing south east of Helpringham.
