= Sleaford railway station =

Railway station in Lincolnshire, England

Sleaford
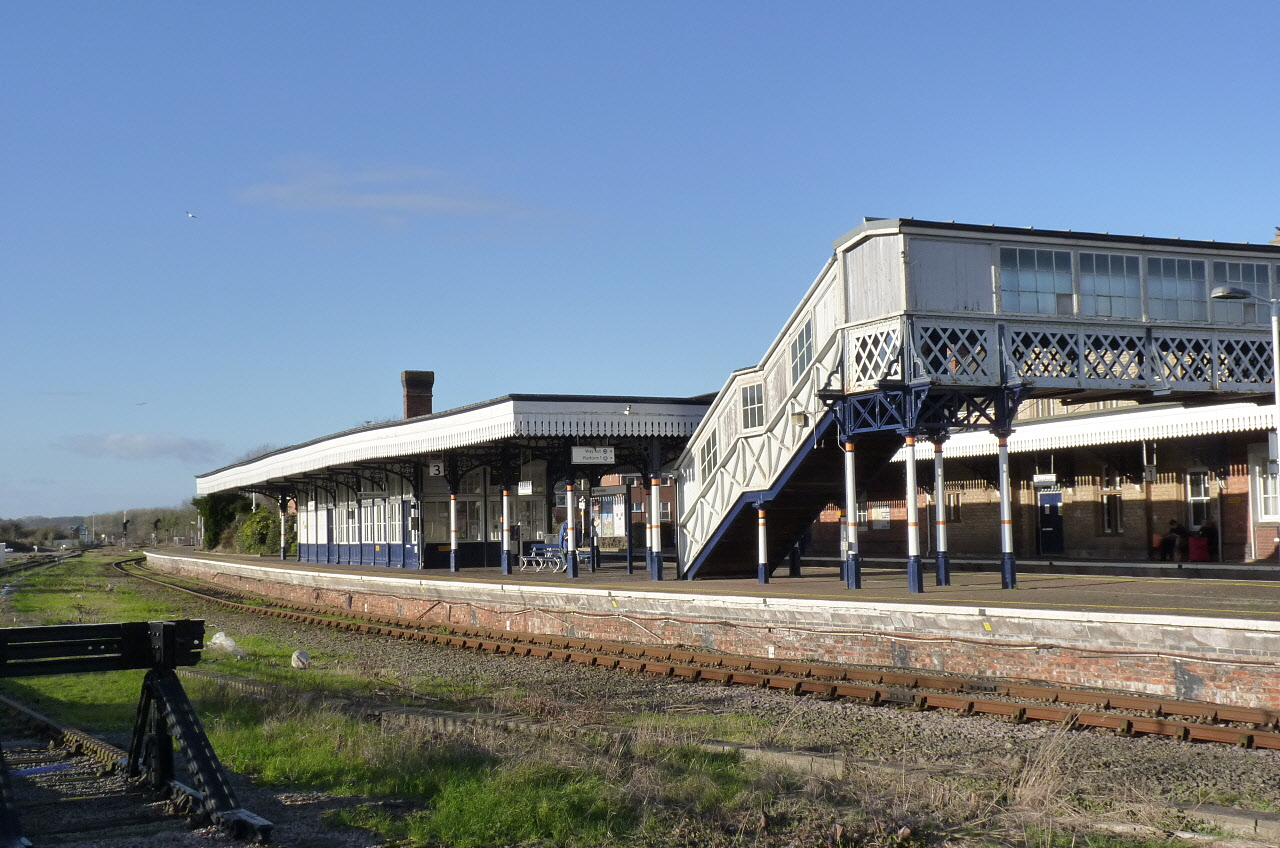

General information
- Location: Sleaford, North Kesteven; England
- Coordinates: 52.995488°N 0.410350°W
- Grid reference: TF067454
- Manager: East Midlands Railway
- Platforms: 3

Other information
- Station code: SLR
- Classification: DfT category E

Passengers
- 2020/21: ▼76,590
- Interchange: ▼12,071
- 2021/22: ▲224,066
- Interchange: ▲31,840
- 2022/23: ▲231,092
- Interchange: ▼31,340
- 2023/24: ▲257,300
- Interchange: ▲34,025
- 2024/25: ▲295,790
- Interchange: ▲35,611
Location
Notes
- Passenger statistics from the Office of Rail and Road

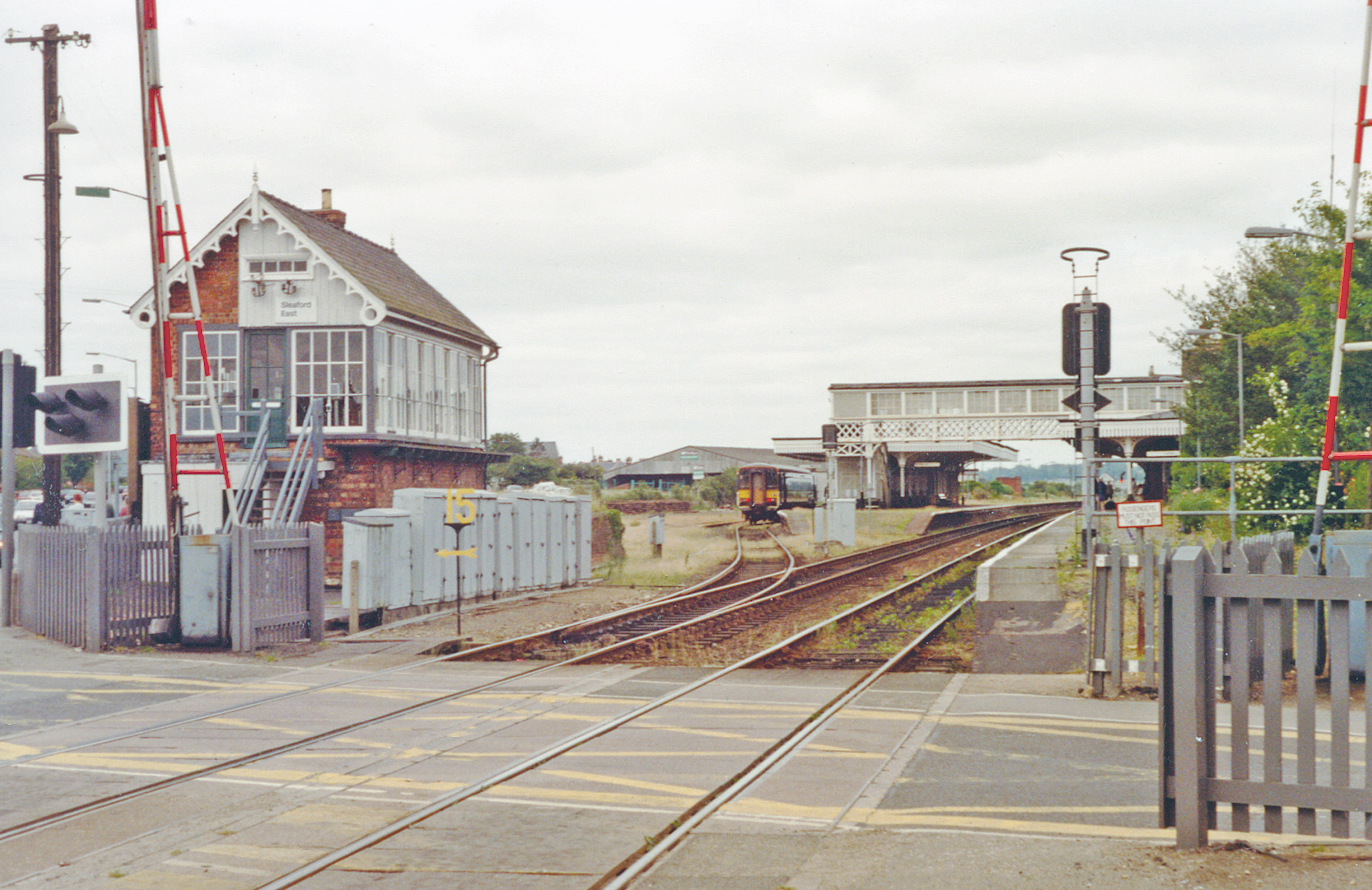
View from the level crossing

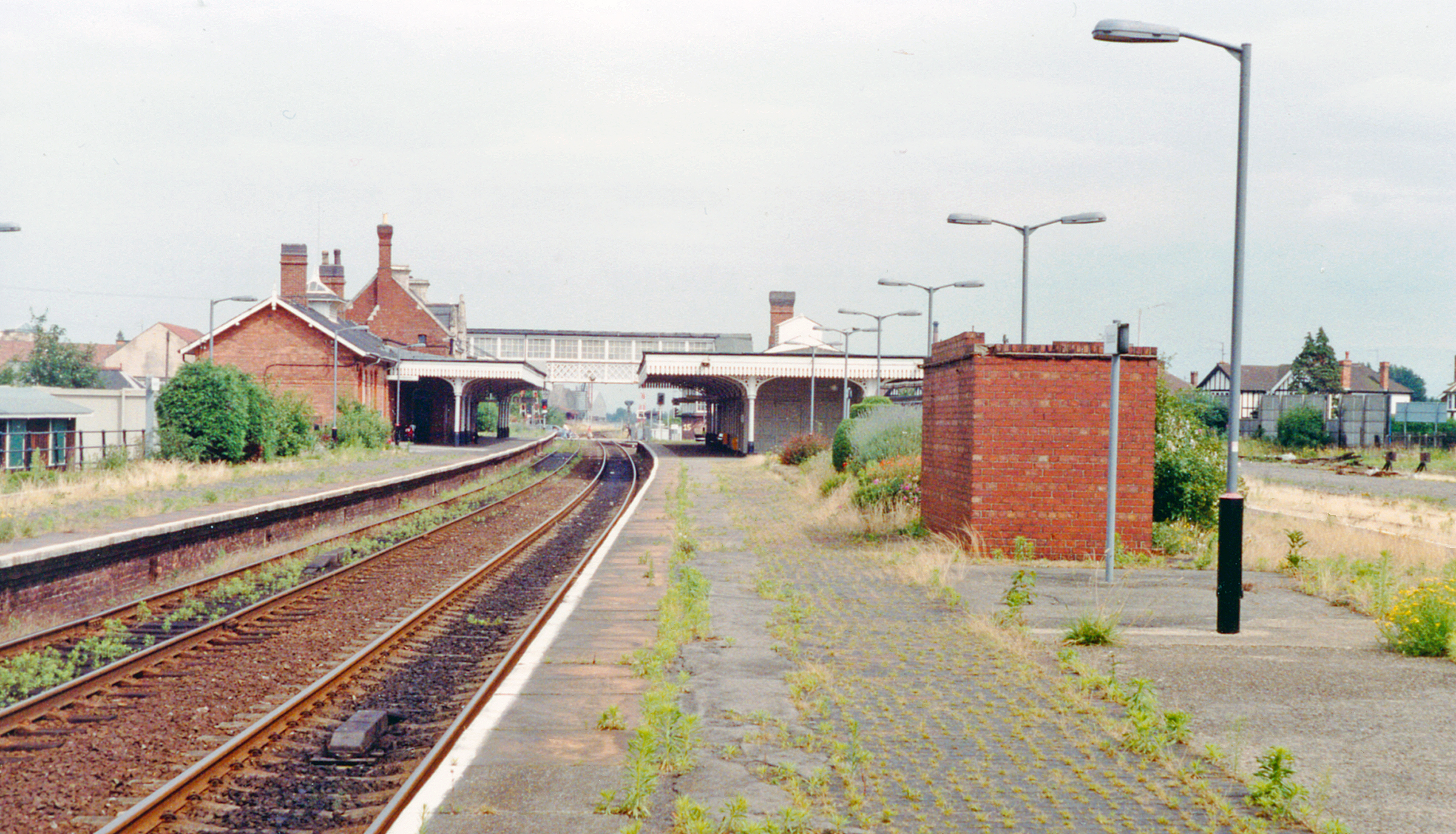
Platform view

Sleaford railway station serves the town of Sleaford in Lincolnshire, England. It lies at the intersection of the Peterborough–Lincoln line and the Poacher Line from Grantham to Skegness via Boston. The station is 21 miles (34 km) south of Lincoln Central.

The station is now owned by Network Rail and managed by East Midlands Railway who provide all rail services.

== History ==
=== Early proposals ===
The Sleaford Navigation, which canalised a 12 1/2-mile (20.1 km) stretch of the River Slea from its junction with the River Witham to Sleaford, opened in 1794. It facilitated the export of agricultural produce to the midlands and the import of coal and oil. Mills sprang up along the river's course and the Navigation Company's wharves were built near its office on Carre Street in Sleaford. In 1827, the River Witham Navigation committee investigated the possibility of a railway allowing Ancaster stone to be transported to the Sleaford Navigation. The cost of doing so and competition from other quarries meant that their plans came to nothing.

An 1836 scheme envisaged a railway between Nottingham and Boston which would have stopped at Sleaford, but the plans never left the drawing board. Another attempt, the Eastern Counties scheme, unsuccessfully tried to build a railway between Lincoln and Cambridge, with a branch to Boston via Heckington and an extension to Sleaford. After protests from the Sleaford Navigation company, the necessary Bill never passed. In 1845, the Ambergate Company designed a railway from Ambergate to Nottingham, with branches to Boston, Spalding, Grantham and Sleaford. A Bill to that effect passed through the Houses of Parliament in 1846, but the railway only reached Grantham. In the meantime, the more ambitious Great Northern Railway from London to York was also endorsed by an Act of Parliament; it passed through Grantham and a loop line from Boston to Lincoln was operating by 1848, yet its planned extension between Boston and Sleaford was not sanctioned.

=== The railways arrive ===
A new plan emerged in 1852 and was presented before Parliament the following year. The Sleaford, Boston and Midland Counties Railway would pass through Boston, Sleaford and Grantham. The proposals met with considerable support from businessmen in Sleaford, including a number of Navigation officials; they envisaged it as a mode of transporting coal and stone. The Bill passed in August 1853. Constructed by Smith, Knight & Co. under the supervision of the engineers W. H. Brydone and Edward Harrison, the line between Barkston, near Grantham, and Sleaford opened on 15 June 1857. An elaborate set of celebrations were organised for the opening day of the new Sleaford railway station, which saw all of the town's businesses close to allow their employees chance take part in the festivities; over 700 men from the area were invited to a free lunch on the cricket fields.

The Grantham–Sleaford line cost £130,000 to construct, averaging at £11,850 per mile; the extension to Boston opened on 12 April 1859, at a cost of £6,500 per mile, considerably cheaper thanks to the flat terrain (the hillier Ancaster area, by contrast, required cuttings). From the outset, the rolling stock was owned by the Great Northern Railway Company (GNR), who took over ownership of the line on 1 July 1864.

=== New connections ===
The Great Eastern Railway wanted to build a line from Cambridge to York, which would have passed through Sleaford and Bourne, but Parliament would not allow it. The GNR submitted a proposal for a line between Bourne and Sleaford, which, after amendments to the route, was approved in 1865 and opened in 1872. Next came the Great Northern and Great Eastern Joint Railway which opened from Spalding through Sleaford to Ruskington and from there to Lincoln Central in 1882. Kirk and Parry, Sleaford-based building contractors, built the line, while the Ruskington-based builders Pattinson's constructed the new stations along the route. The line was designed to transport freight, which necessitated an avoiding line around Sleaford; Sleaford station was also extended. The last new line through Sleaford ran to RAF Cranwell and opened in 1916.

=== Operations and later history ===
The Cranwell branch ran at a loss: in response to a Parliamentary Question, it was revealed that, allowing for a credit in respect of the c.15,000 tons of Government stores that were transported along it during 1924, the line made a loss of some £3,570, although it was reported that "any alternative means ... would involve considerably greater expenditure". Having ceased to carry passenger traffic in 1927, it closed completely in 1956.

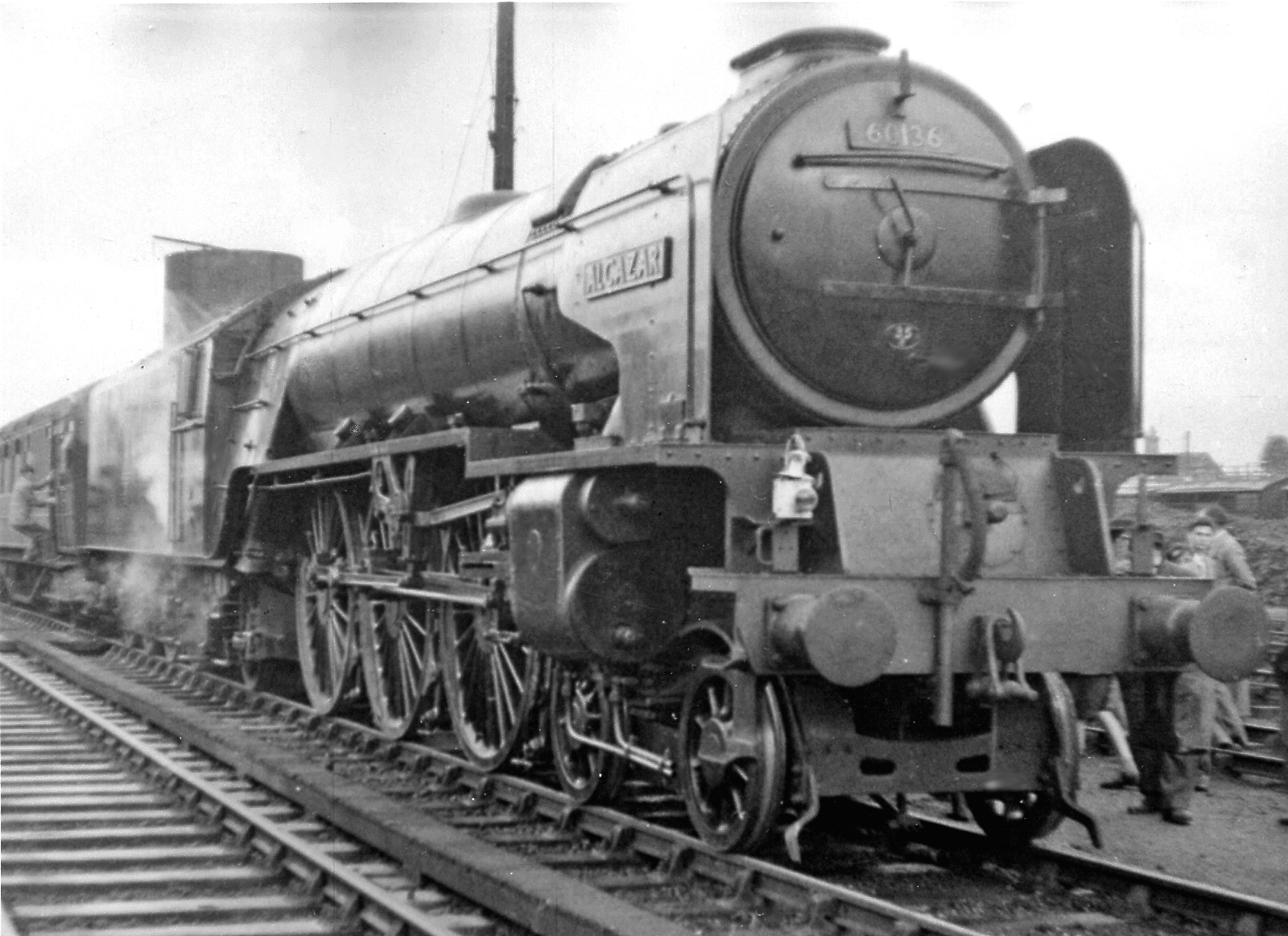
19 September 1954. A1 4-6-2 No. 60136 'Alcazar' heads Trains Illustrated Fenland Rail Tour at Sleaford

Passenger services on the Bourne branch ceased on 22 September 1930. The Spalding line closed in 1964.

The Grantham to Boston and Spalding to Lincoln Central lines remain open, as does the north to south link line bypassing the station. This has recently been refurbished by Network Rail and returned to full operation after several years of disuse (as part of the plan to route more freight trains onto the latter and away from the busy East Coast Main Line).

Sleaford is still one of only a few places still to have signal boxes named 'North', 'South', 'West' and 'East' around the area. With the North and South boxes on the Peterborough–Lincoln line, and then the West and East boxes are at each end of the station on the Grantham to Boston Line. So if travelling from Lincoln Central to Peterborough on the train you would pass all four boxes. The North and South boxes are however due to be decommissioned as part of the upgrade work mentioned above at the end of 2013.

== Services ==
All services at Sleaford are operated by East Midlands Railway.

On weekdays and Saturdays, the station is generally served by an hourly service northbound to Lincoln and southbound to Peterborough. Five trains per day are extended beyond Lincoln to Doncaster. The station is also served by a single daily service to and from Newark North Gate. Services to/from Peterborough now run in the evenings since the route was modernised and resignalled in 2015.

The station is also served by an hourly service westbound to Nottingham via Grantham and eastbound to Skegness via Boston.

On Sundays, the service is served by a limited service between Nottingham and Skegness, with additional services during the summer months. Enhancements to the Nottingham to Skegness service on Sundays are due to be made during the life of the East Midlands franchise. There are no Sunday services to Peterborough or Lincoln.

Preceding station	National Rail	Following station
Grantham	East Midlands Railway Poacher Line	Heckington
Rauceby Limited Service	East Midlands Railway Poacher Line	Heckington
Ruskington	East Midlands Railway: Peterborough to Lincoln Line; Monday-Saturday only	Spalding
	Historical railways	
Ruskington Line and station open	Great Northern and Great Eastern Joint Railway Peterborough to Lincoln Line	Helpringham Line open, station closed
	Disused railways	
Terminus	Great Northern Railway Bourne and Sleaford Railway	Aswarby and Scredington Line and station closed
Cranwell Line and station closed	Great Northern Railway Cranwell branch	Terminus
