= Branston and Mere =

Civil parish in Lincolnshire, England

Coordinates: 53.187°N 0.462°W

Branston and Mere is a civil parish in the North Kesteven district of Lincolnshire, England, about 4 miles (6 km) roughly south-east of Lincoln. The parish is a long strip between the RAF Waddington airfield and the River Witham near Bardney. The A15 road crosses the extreme west and the parish is bisected by the Sleaford to Lincoln railway line The civil parish was created in 1931, by merging the two former parishes of Branston and Mere.

Branston and Mere includes Branston, Branston Booths and Bardney Lock. Branston Island is an irregular shaped bit of land, separated from the rest of the parish by the River Witham, enclosed by the old and new courses of that river. The name of the former medieval village of Mere is preserved in the names of Mere House, Mere Hall, and Mere Lane. Branston Hall, a former stately home and hospital, is now a hotel. Longhills Hall is a country house.

In the 2001 census the population of the parish (including Branston Booths) was recorded as 4019 in 1693 households, increasing to 4,095 in 1,823 households at the 2011 census.

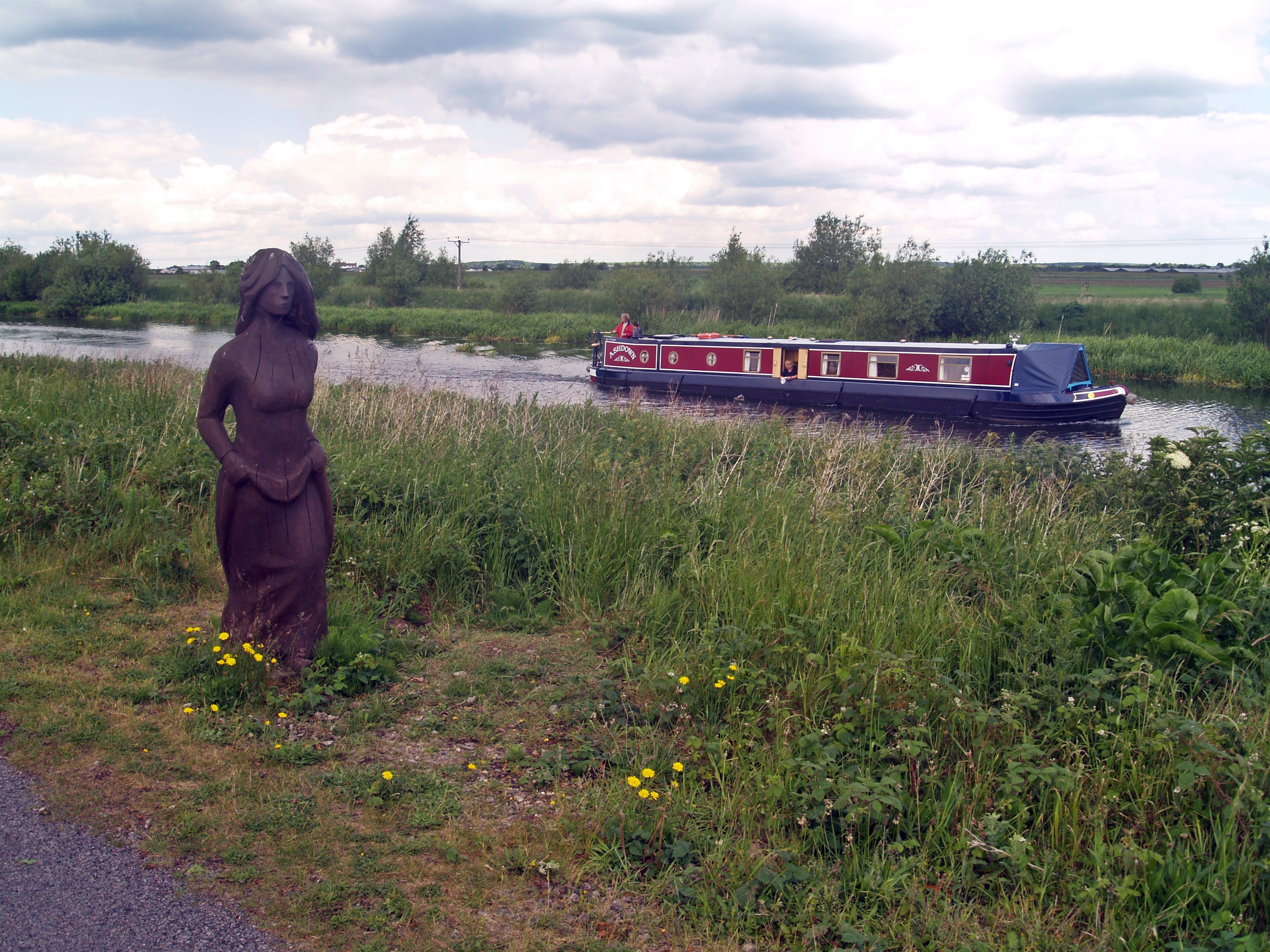
The River Witham passes through the Parish. On the far side of the river is Branston Island

The parish meets Heighington and Canwick around 330 yards (300 m) north of the school, towards Heighington. The parish boundary with Heighington passes close to the edge of the east of the village, skirting the school's playing fields. The boundary follows Moor Lane across the railway line along the road to Branston Booths where it meets the B1190 and Car Dyke, and along the Branston Delph on Branston Fen, crossing the River Witham, becoming the North Kesteven and West Lindsey boundary. The section north-east of the Witham is called Branston Island, meeting Fiskerton, Stainfield and Bardney, passing Bardney Lock. It meets Potter Hanworth at Bardney Bridge and follows Branston Causeway (which becomes the B1190) westwards, skirting the north edge of Potterhanworth Booths. It follows the B1202 westwards for around a half mile, then skirts the southern edge of a wood, crosses the railway line and Little Gate Lane, then Sleaford Road (B1188).

It meets Nocton west of Fox Covert, and crosses Bloxholm Lane at the point where Branston Lane crosses, and meets Waddington halfway between Bloxholm Lane and the A15. Mere Hall is around a mile to the north. It crosses the A15 220 yards (200 m) south of the B1178 junction, and passing through the eastern section of the airfield. The boundary passes northwards through RAF Waddington, with the north-eastern section of the runway in the parish. It crosses the A15 at the northern edge of RAF Waddington, just off the point where it meets Bracebridge Heath. It follows Bloxholm Lane to the north, and skirts the northern part of Westfield Farm, where it meets Canwick. It crosses the B1188 where the pylons cross the road. 440 yards (400 m) east it meets Washingborough, following a small beck and skirting the north edge of the village.

The western end of the parish is on the high ground of the Lincolnshire Limestone while the eastern end is closer to sea level, the historic marshes of the River Witham.
