= Langoe Wapentake =

Langoe Wapentake was one of the ancient divisions of the parts of Kesteven in the County of Lincolnshire. It was separated into two divisions, named First and Second. The First division consisted of the Parishes of Billinghay, Kirkby Green and Timberland. The second division contained Blankney, Dunston, Metheringham, Nocton, Potterhanworth, Scopwick and Washingborough.
