= Heighington =

Heighington may refer to:

== Places ==
- Heighington, County Durham, England
- Heighington, Lincolnshire, England

== Other uses ==
- Heighington (surname)
- Heighington railway station, serves the County Durham village
