= Heighington, Lincolnshire =

Village and civil parish in the North Kesteven district of Lincolnshire, England

Coordinates: 53.211957°N 0.457390°W

Heighington
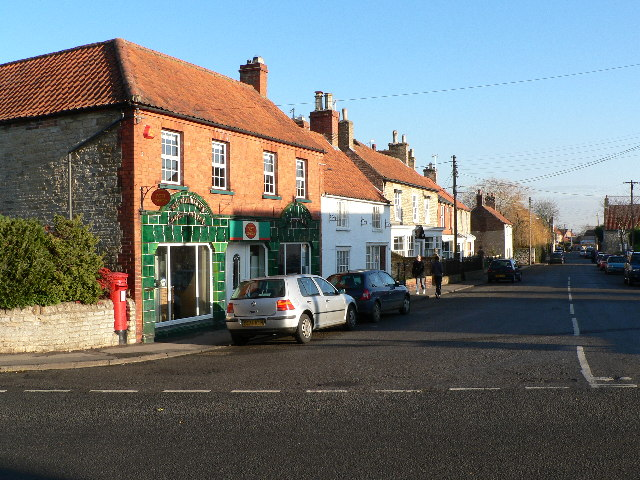
- Heighington's old post office

- Location within Lincolnshire
- Population: 2,918 (2001 Census)
- OS grid reference: TF030693
  - London: 115 mi (185 km) S
- District: North Kesteven
- Shire county: Lincolnshire
- Region: East Midlands
- Country: England
- Sovereign state: United Kingdom
- Post town: LINCOLN
- Postcode district: LN4
- Dialling code: 01522
- Police: Lincolnshire
- Fire: Lincolnshire
- Ambulance: East Midlands
- UK Parliament: Sleaford and North Hykeham

Heighington (/ˈheɪ.ɪŋ.tən/ HAY-ing-tən) is a village and civil parish in the North Kesteven district of Lincolnshire, England. It is situated about 4 miles (6 km) south-east of Lincoln.

In the 2001 Census the population of the parish was recorded as 2,918 in 1,203 households.

== Geography ==
Heighington civil parish adjoins to the south of Washingborough. To the west of the village, the parish boundary with Washingborough follows Sheepwash Lane and at the bridge at the crossroads over the railway, follows Washingborough Road east. When travelling on the main road between the two villages, Washingborough Pits is the main demarcation. It passes along Gail Grove, a section of Lee Avenue, Sandra Crescent, along the back of the gardens of Eve Gardens to the east, then along a footpath to the north of Sunningdale Grove. It follows the footpath east, then follows a hedge northwards to meet Fen Road (B1190), passing through Moor Farm, to the east of the farm shop, and north of Willow Tree Farm, it follows Middle Fen Lane to the north-east along Heighington Fen. It passes to the north of Slate House Farm along a track, and at Boundary Farm, next to the River Witham and National Cycle Route 1 (Water Rail Way), it becomes the North Kesteven boundary, with West Lindsey and Fiskerton. At Branston Island, on the Witham, it meets Branston, and follows the Branston Delph to the south-west. Just south of Corporation Farm, at Branston Booths, it crosses Bardney Road (B1190) and Car Dyke, then follows Moor Lane, and crosses the railway. 330 yards (300 m) west of the junction with Potterhanworth Road, it follows a hedge-line north, close to the east of Branston and on the eastern edge of Branston Community College playing fields. 220 yards (200 m) north of the school on Branston Road, it meets the parish of Washingborough, at the point where it joins the footpath to Washingborough Top. The parish does not border Canwick.

== History ==
Heighington is not mentioned in Domesday.

The chapel may have originally been a chapel of ease or a field church. It is mentioned in a will of 1524. A clock was erected to serve as a Great War memorial on the tower of Heighington's Chapel of Ease in 1924.

Heighington Railway station closed in 1964.

== Community ==
Parts of Heighington lie within a conservation area. The 2001 Census recorded 1,203 households. The parish council has 11 members. The village shares a county councillor with Washingborough.

St Thomas' church in Heighington is not in fact a church but a Chapel of ease. This is because it lies within the same parish boundary as St John's church in Washingborough, which is the parish church. Historically there has been no reference to it being a church, it was always referred to as "the chapel" as far back as records go. The chapel was not dedicated to a particular saint until 1993 when the Bishop of Lincoln dedicated it to St Thomas, within the group of churches in Washingborough with Heighington, and Canwick. The building is of 12th-century origin, it is Grade II listed, and was restored in 1619 as a chapel by Thomas Garratt, a 'fen-adventurer' of the fen drainage scheme. Garratt gave lands for the support of the teaching of grammar and Latin and the reading of divine service within the chapel. This teaching took place until 1864–65, after which a new attached school house was built by Michael Drury, the older structure reserved for Church of England worship. This grammar school was attached to the church until 1885, and later moved to the Thomas Garrett Arts, Crafts and Heritage Centre; it closed in 1976.

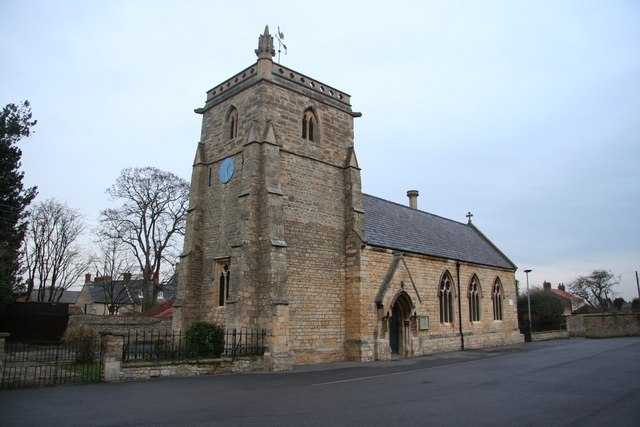
St.Thomas' church

In 1885 Kelly’s noted the presence of Wesleyan and Wesleyan Reform chapels. A Grade II listed former Methodist chapel, originally built in 1815, still exists now used as a business premises. According to Kelly's the parish of Washingborough, which included Heighington, had an 1881 population of 747, was of 2,147 acres (9 km^{2}), and had agricultural production of chiefly wheat, oats and barley.

Heighington's 23 (2019) listed buildings include a manor house, farmhouse, and various houses and cottages with other attached buildings. A notable unlisted building is Heighington Hall, an 18th-century mansion with gardens designed by the noted landscape architect Edward Milner.

Village public houses are the Butcher and Beast and the Turks Head, both on High Street.

The village school is Heighington Millfield Primary Academy (formerly Millfield Community Primary School). To the south of the village and east of the railway line is Bracken Hill Golf Club. The Peterborough to Lincoln Line passes through the west of the village. The Branston and Heighington railway station closed in the 1960s and was on the south-western edge of the village on Station Road. Five Mile House railway station on the Lincolnshire Loop Line, although close to Fiskerton, was also within the parish boundary. That line closed in 1964. The nearest active station is Lincoln.
