= Henry Stonex =

British composer and organist

Henry Stonex (18 May 1823 – 10 January 1897) was a composer and organist based in Great Yarmouth.

== Life ==
He was born in Norwich on 18 May 1823 to Rowland Stonex and Mary Bridgman.

He married Mary Tilney Bassett (d. 1882), daughter of Henry Bassett of Heigham, on 16 January 1851 and had the following children:

- Mary Gertrude Stonex (b. 21 Mar 1852)
- Henry Bassett Stonex (b. 4 Sep 1853, d. 1923)
- Florence Tilney Stonex (b. 1855)
- Canon Francis Stonex (b. 28 Sep 1857)
- Edward Claude Stonex (b. 22 Dec 1858)
- Edith Bassett Stonex (b. 4 Jan 1860)
- Alfred Herbert Stonex (1862 - 1863)
- Blanche Lillian Stonex (b. 1863)

He studied organ under James Harcourt at St Peter Mancroft, and then was apprenticed to Zechariah Buck at Norwich Cathedral.

Whilst in Great Yarmouth he conducted the Yarmouth Musical Society for many years.

He died in 1897 in Great Yarmouth.

== Appointments ==
- Organist at St. Nicholas' Church, Great Yarmouth, 1850 - 1894

== Compositions ==
He is best known for his psalm chant which is still widely used in Anglican churches to this day, and has been recorded frequently.

Cultural offices
Preceded by George Warne	Organist of St. Nicholas Church, Great Yarmouth; 1856-1895	Succeeded by Haydon Hare
