= Thorpe Tilney =

Hamlet of Lincolnshire, England

Coordinates: 53.100°N 0.327°W

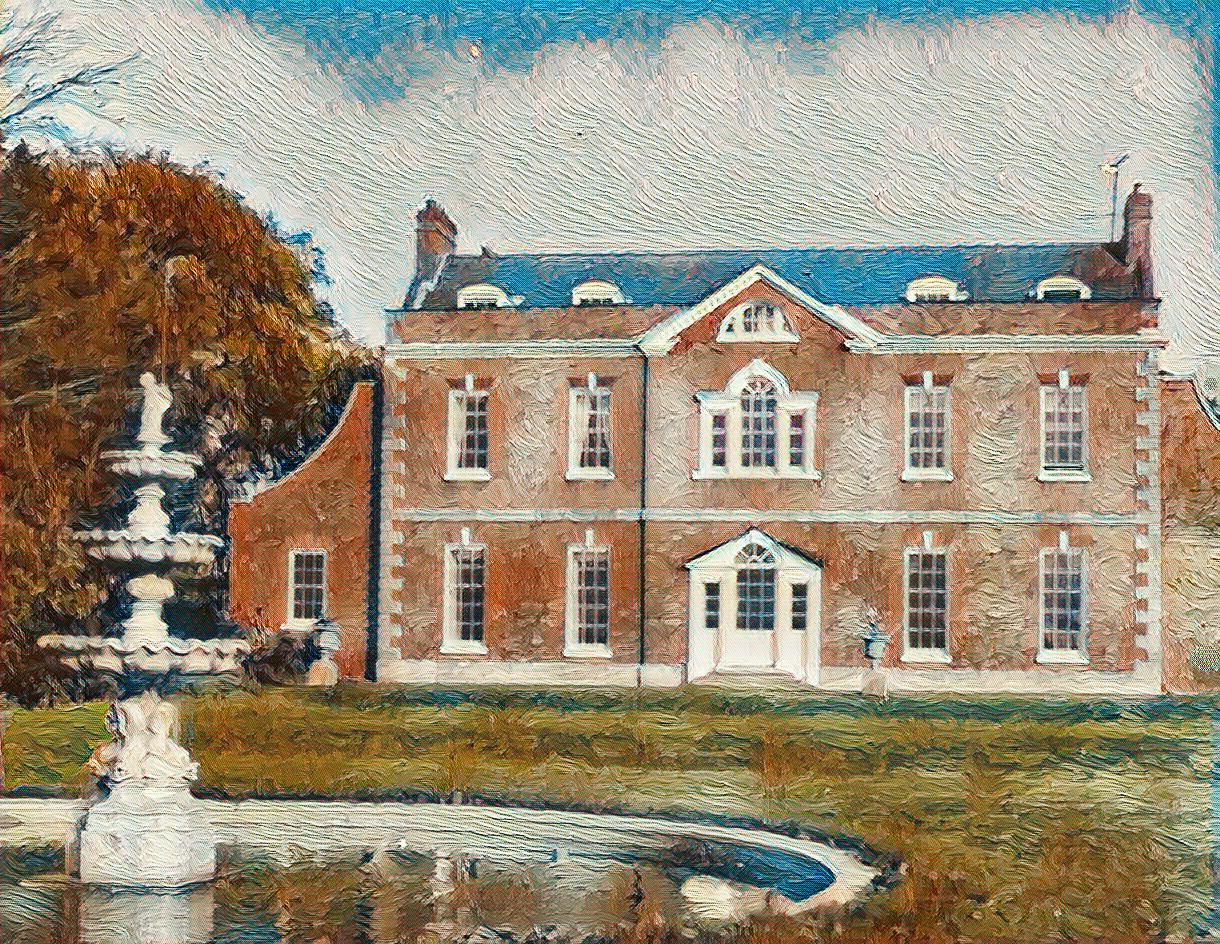
- Thorpe Tilney Hall

- Location within Lincolnshire
- OS grid reference: TF120572
  - London: 110 mi (180 km) S
- Civil parish: Timberland
- District: North Kesteven
- Shire county: Lincolnshire
- Region: East Midlands
- Country: England
- Sovereign state: United Kingdom
- Post town: Lincoln
- Postcode district: LN4
- Police: Lincolnshire
- Fire: Lincolnshire
- Ambulance: East Midlands
- UK Parliament: Sleaford and North Hykeham

Thorpe Tilney is a hamlet in the civil parish of Timberland, in the North Kesteven district of Lincolnshire, England. The hamlet lies directly south of Timberland, on the B1189 towards Walcott.

== History ==
Neolithic axes made of stone and flint have been found around the village. Later finds include a piece of Roman pottery, a Bronze Age barrow and a Bronze Age flanged bronze axe.

In 1545 three houses in Thorpe Tilney, a possession of the dissolved Kyme Priory, were granted to John Broxholme and John Bellowe. A farm on a slight hill east of the Car Dyke may represent the site, which is known locally as Priory Hill.

Evans Farmhouse, originally an inn on the then Billinghay to Metheringham road, is also a listed building, built of red brick and dating from 1782.

Thorpe Tilney was a township in the parish of Timberland until Thorpe Tilney became a separate civil parish in 1866. On 1 April 1931 the parish was abolished and merged with Timberland. In 1921 the parish had a population of 126.

== Thorpe Tilney Hall ==
Thorpe Tilney Hall is a Grade II listed red brick country house dating from 1740 with later alterations and additions. Also listed are the Orangery and attached garden dating from 17th Century, and the stable block and cottage dating from 1740. The current Hall replaces an earlier medieval building, the ruin of which was demolished in 1969, which stood 100 yards (91 m) away on the site of Hall Farm. This earlier Hall was struck by lightning and destroyed in 1705, and the Orangery and its associated walled garden relate to this earlier building, and are dated c. 1680.

The Hall was used by the Whichcote family as a dower house for their main seat, Aswarby Park, the other side of Sleaford, and one of their tombs can be seen in the adjacent Timberland church. The Whichcotes continued to own Thorpe Tilney, with a 2,000 acres (8 km^{2}) estate, until 1918, when much of the land was bought by the County Council to provide small-holdings for returning soldiers.

Latterly, Thorpe Tilney Hall was owned by the aristocratic Stockdale family who restored the building. Freddie Stockdale (1947–2018), an opera impresario, oversaw in 1977 the construction of the Opera Pavilion to a design by Francis Johnson, with stained glass by John Piper in the grounds of the hall. At this time the Hall became well known for operatic performances.

The house was used as a filming location in two separate television productions of Pride and Prejudice, first in 1980 and then in 1995.
