= George Warne (organist) =

English organist and composer

George Warne (1792 - 29 October 1868) was a blind organist and composer born in Norfolk. He was noted as holding a number of organists posts despite being blind.

Warne was in charge of music at the Temple Church from 1826 until 1843, the church's second blind organist after John Stanley, who was organist from 1734 until his death in 1786. In 1838 Warne composed a set of psalm tunes for use there. Psalmody settings such as these were representative of the Temple's church music practices at this period. Sung by a mixed quartet from the organ gallery, they were the only musical elements in the service, which was otherwise spoken. This was "the normal tone of metrical psalmody in Anglican churches before the influence of the Tractarian movement made itself felt".

The church was closed for restoration in 1840, and when it re-opened in 1842 it was decided that a regular choral service should be resumed, and a choir of six men and eight boys was recruited. Warne, not familiar with the choral service and not used to organizing regular practice, was retired on full salary in 1843 and succeeded by Edward John Hopkins.

From December 1943 Warne continued as an organist in Yarmouth, where he was noted for his interludes and improvisations played between the verses of the hymns. Once again he was the second blind organist at the church, after Henry R. Chicheley, organist from 1762 until 1788. He left the post in 1850 and died in Bath on 29 October 1868.

== Appointments ==
- Organist of St Helen's Bishopsgate 1819 - 1820
- Organist of St Magnus-the-Martyr 1820 - 1826
- Organist of Temple Church 1826 - 1843
- Organist of St. Nicholas Church, Great Yarmouth 1843 - 1856

== Compositions ==
He composed

- Grand March and Finale for the Piano Forte (1828)
- Home Sweet Home, arranged with Variations
- Set of psalm tunes, as sung at the Temple Church, London (1838)
- Songs : Broken gold; Come away to the grotto; Evening song; bring me my harp; We meet again in heaven
- Quadrilles, galops, and other music for the pianoforte

Cultural offices
| Preceded by William Henry Cutler | Organist of St Helen's Bishopsgate; 1819-1820 | Succeeded by Joseph Nightingale |
| Preceded by Thomas Phippen Cooke | Organist of St Magnus-the-Martyr; 1820-1826 | Succeeded by William Crathern |
| Preceded by George Price | Organist of Temple Church; 1826-1843 | Succeeded by Edward John Hopkins |
| Preceded by Joseph Baxfield | Organist of St. Nicholas Church, Great Yarmouth; 1843-1856 | Succeeded by Henry Stonex |
