= Heighington (surname) =

Heighington is a surname. Notable people with the surname include:

- Chris Heighington (born 1983), Australian-born English rugby league player
- Musgrave Heighington (c. 1680 – 1764), English organist and composer
- Wilfrid Heighington (1897–1945), Canadian soldier, writer, lawyer and politician
