= Wymondham Abbey =

Coordinates: 52°34′14″N 1°06′30″E

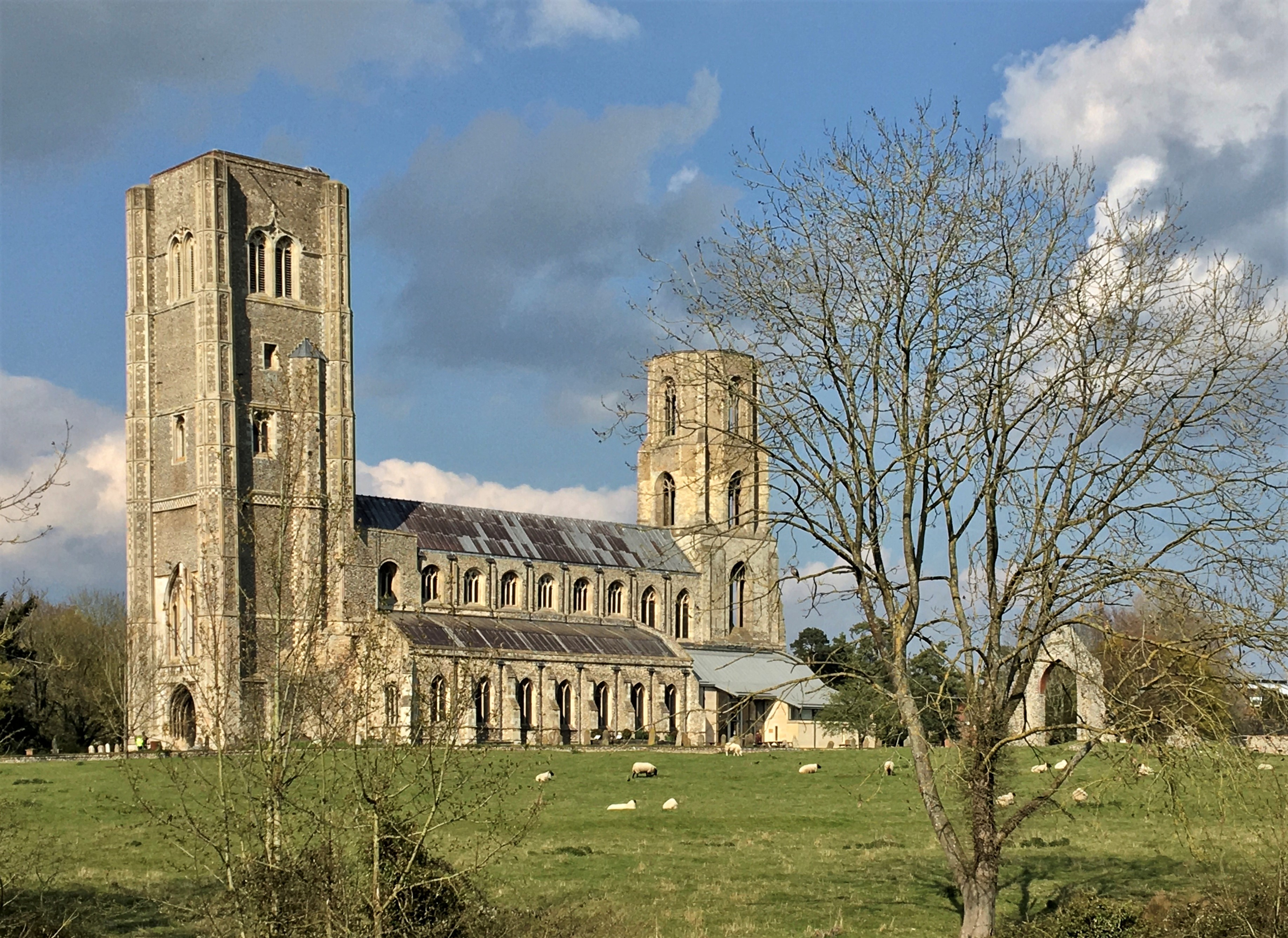
- View of the south side of the abbey from across the River Tiffey, clearly showing the ruined, octagonal, east tower at right, and the newer square west tower at left.
- Wymondham Abbey
- OS grid reference: TG 10715 01412
- Location: Wymondham, Norfolk
- Country: England
- Denomination: Church of England
- Previous denomination: Roman Catholic Church
- Churchmanship: Anglo-Catholic
- Website: wymondhamabbey.org.uk

History
- Status: Active

Architecture
- Functional status: Parish Church

Administration
- Diocese: Diocese of Norwich
- Archdeaconry: Archdeaconry of Norfolk
- Deanery: Deanery of Humbleyard
- Parish: Wymondham

Clergy
- Vicar: The Revd Fr Andrew Hammond

Wymondham Abbey (pronounced Windum) is the Anglican parish church for the town of Wymondham in Norfolk, England.

== History ==
The monastery was founded in 1107 by William d'Aubigny, Butler (Pincerna) to King Henry I. William was a prominent Norfolk landowner, with estates in Wymondham and nearby New Buckenham. The d'Aubigny (sometimes Latinised to d'Albini) family originated from St. Martin d'Aubigny in Normandy.

William d'Aubigny's monastery was a dependency of the Benedictine monastery at St Albans, where his uncle Richard was Abbot. The foundation charter stipulated that the prior, as a token of dependence, was to pay a mark of silver yearly to the abbot on the festival of St. Alban. If the priory should become an abbey, then all tokens of subjection to St. Albans would cease. Wymondham Priory was relatively small, initially intended for some twelve Benedictine monks, but grew in influence and wealth over the coming centuries. William d'Aubigny, the founder, and Maud his wife, who was the daughter of Roger Bigod, and sister of Hugh Bigod, 1st Earl of Norfolk, richly endowed the priory with lands, churches, tithes, and rents.

The founder intended his church to serve as a parish church for the local community as well as a monastic church for the monks, an ill-defined arrangement that led to frequent disputes. The monastic east end was completed by about 1130, and the western half (for the parish) about thirty years later. It was originally dedicated to the Virgin Mary and St Alban. Later, following the murder of Thomas Becket in 1170, Becket's name was added to the dedication and Alban's dropped. Archaeological excavation in 2002 and 2017 disclosed indications of a Late Saxon or early Norman church beneath the nave of the current church. In 1249, Pope Innocent IV ruled that the monks should have the chancel, central tower, transepts, south aisle and SW tower, while the nave N aisle and NW tower became the parish church served by an independent vicar instituted by the bishop.

In 1174, the founder's grandson, William d'Aubigny III, established a chapel in the town dedicated to Becket with two monks from the priory as chaplains. Having served as a gild chapel, then a grammar school and later the town library, in 2022 Becket's Chapel was purchased by Historic Norfolk and, following a major restoration, is now run as an arts centre.

In the time of Stephen, King of England, the prior obtained the grant of a three days' fair at Wymondham on the eve, day and morrow of the Nativity of the Blessed Virgin, and also a confirmation of the weekly market. In 1349, both the prior and sub-prior died of the pestilence. Seven of the monks of St. Albans and its cells joined the crusade in Flanders in 1383, under Henry le Despenser, bishop of Norwich. Among them was William York of Wymondham Priory. Of those who returned, none regained their former health, having suffered much from the heat and from foul water. The noted historian and chronicler Thomas Walsingham was appointed prior in 1394.

Disputes between the Wymondham and St. Albans monks were quite common, and in 1449, following a successful petition to the king, Pope Nicholas V granted Wymondham the right to become an Abbey in its own right. However, an episcopal visitation in October, 1492 found numerous irregularities. The buildings of the dorter and farm not repaired; brothers mixed with seculars in the south aisle of the church; they were not in cloister at customary hours; they 'did not exercise themselves in the study of letters' but were 'too fond of ease'. Bishop Goldwell replaced the abbot and the final forty years of the monastery were apparently peaceful and well-ordered.

King Henry VIII's Dissolution of the Monasteries brought about the closure of Wymondham Abbey, which was surrendered to the Royal Commissioner John Flowerdew in 1538. The monks had, apparently willingly, already signed the Oath of Supremacy, and were given generous pensions. The last abbot, Loye Ferrers, was appointed vicar when this post fell vacant.

== Architecture ==
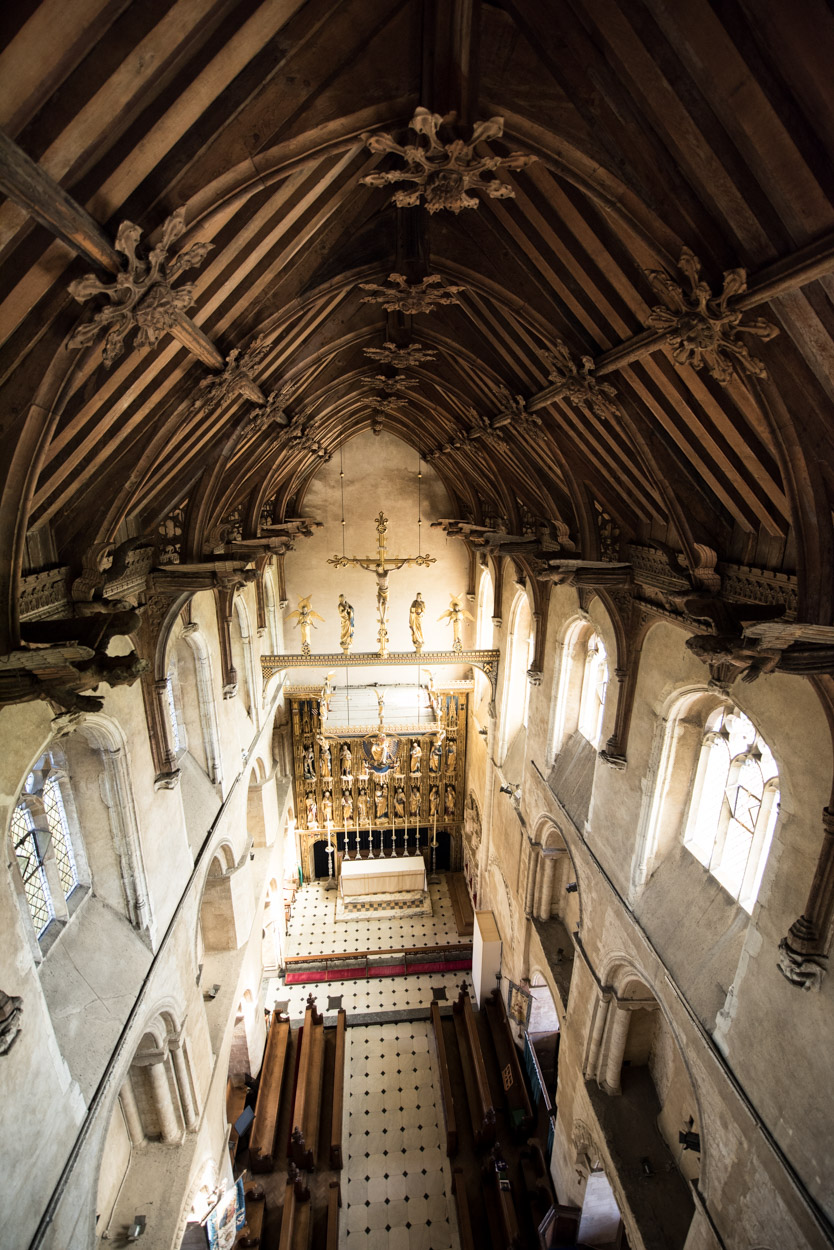
View from the angel roof.

The church was originally cruciform in shape, with a central tower and twin west towers. When it was built, Caen stone in Normandy was shipped specially across the English Channel to face the walls. The central tower became unstable and was replaced in about 1376 by a tall octagonal tower (now part ruined), which held the monks' bells. In 1447, work on a much taller single west tower began. This replaced the original Norman towers and held the townspeople's bells. The parish part of the church (see above) was almost doubled in size in the 14th/15th centuries by enlarging of the north aisle to be wider than the nave. In c.1450 the nave height was raised with new Perpendicular style clerestory windows and an exotic hammer-beam roof incorporating human-sized angels with outstretched wings.

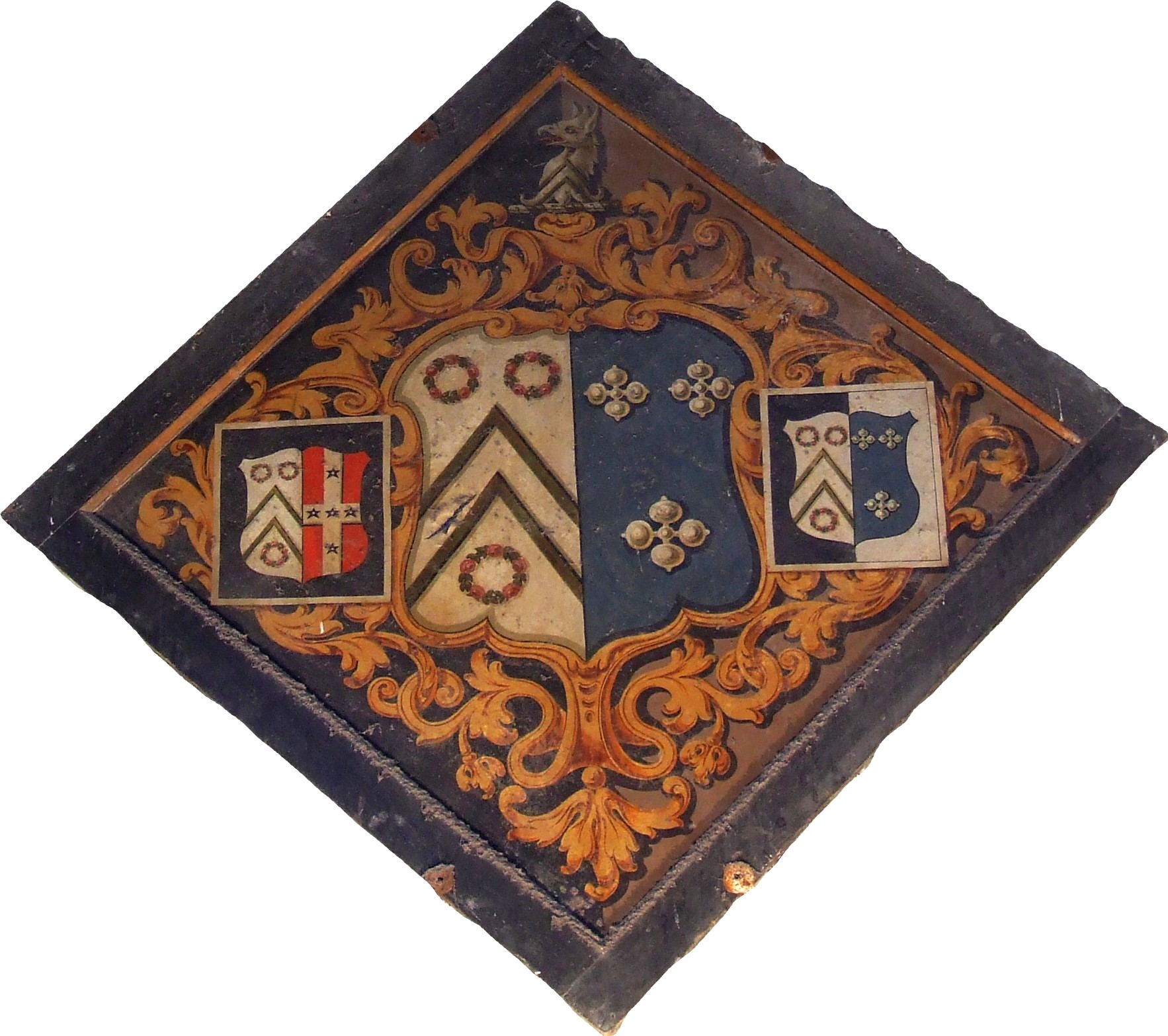
Funerary hatchment now hung in the ringing chamber

The years following the Dissolution saw the gradual demolition of the monastic buildings for re-use of the stone. The eastern end of the church (blocked off from the nave by a solid wall since about 1385) was destroyed, leaving the present church (at 70 m.) only about half its original length. Having failed to secure the east end of the monastic church from the Crown, the parishioners bought the south aisle. This they re-built and greatly enlarged after 1544, incorporating windows re-used from the former chapter house. Repairs to the parish chancel were carried out following Queen Elizabeth I's visit to Norfolk in 1573 (date and initials may be seen on exterior stonework) and most of the Norman pillars were squared off 1584/5.

A notable later benefactor was the Rev'd William Papillon, vicar from 1788 to 1836. Papillon was a wealthy man who purchased the adjacent Abbey Meadow (which gives the church its incomparable rustic setting), separating meadow from churchyard with a ha-ha. He also bought the ruinous east tower, enlarged the churchyard and set up a school for poor children. By the late 1800s the church was again in poor repair with a huge crack in the west tower. A major restoration and re-ordering of the church was carried out 1900-1903 when a new stone gallery was built under the west tower to support the organ in place of a wooden Georgian gallery.

Notable features of the church are the twin towers (a landmark for miles around), the Norman nave, the hammer-beam angel roof of c.1445 in the nave and fine hammer-beam north-aisle roof. The west tower houses a peal of 10 bells, re-cast and re-hung in 1967. Hung in the bell tower are six well-preserved 18th-century hatchments.

=== Interior ===
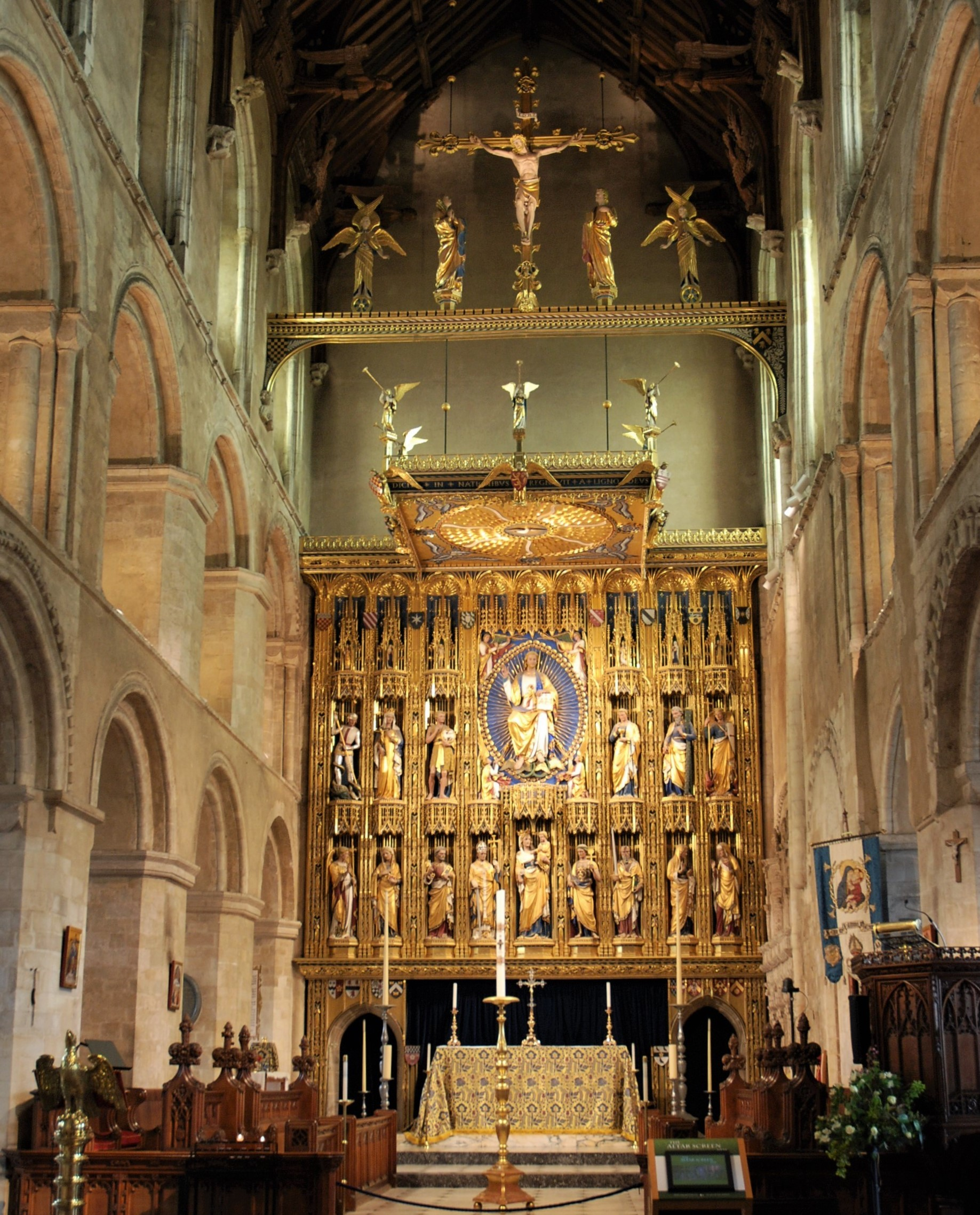
Altar screen, tester and rood figures by Sir Ninian Comper, installed 1921-34 as Great War memorial.

The church is also remarkable for its high quality fittings such as the 1793 organ by James Davis and 1810 chamber organ (also by James Davis). The splendid gilded reredos or altar screen with tester and rood figures above is one of the largest works of Sir Ninian Comper. This was dedicated in 1921 as a war memorial, though the gilding was not finished until 1934. Other works by Comper are the serene statue of the Virgin and Child and nearby paschal candlestick.

Also of note is the Renaissance c.1520 terracotta sedilia, once thought to be a memorial to Abbot Loye Ferrers. This is Italian work from the same workshop as tombs at Oxborough, Norfolk and Layer Marney, Essex. Note also the 1712 Georgian candelabrum (now in the Lady Chapel) and Royal Arms of George II (south aisle), the carved octagonal 15th Century font with modern gilded font cover by Cecil Upcher, the Arts and Crafts Triptych by E P Warren and Robert Anning Bell in the Lady Chapel and many smaller features such as angels, musicians and figures carved on the roof timbers and corbels.

A modern icon panel by the late Rev. David Hunter is on display in the church, which tells the story of St Thomas Becket’s life. The Stations of the Cross icons in the nave and chancel are by iconographer Helen McIldowie-Jenkins.

== Present day ==
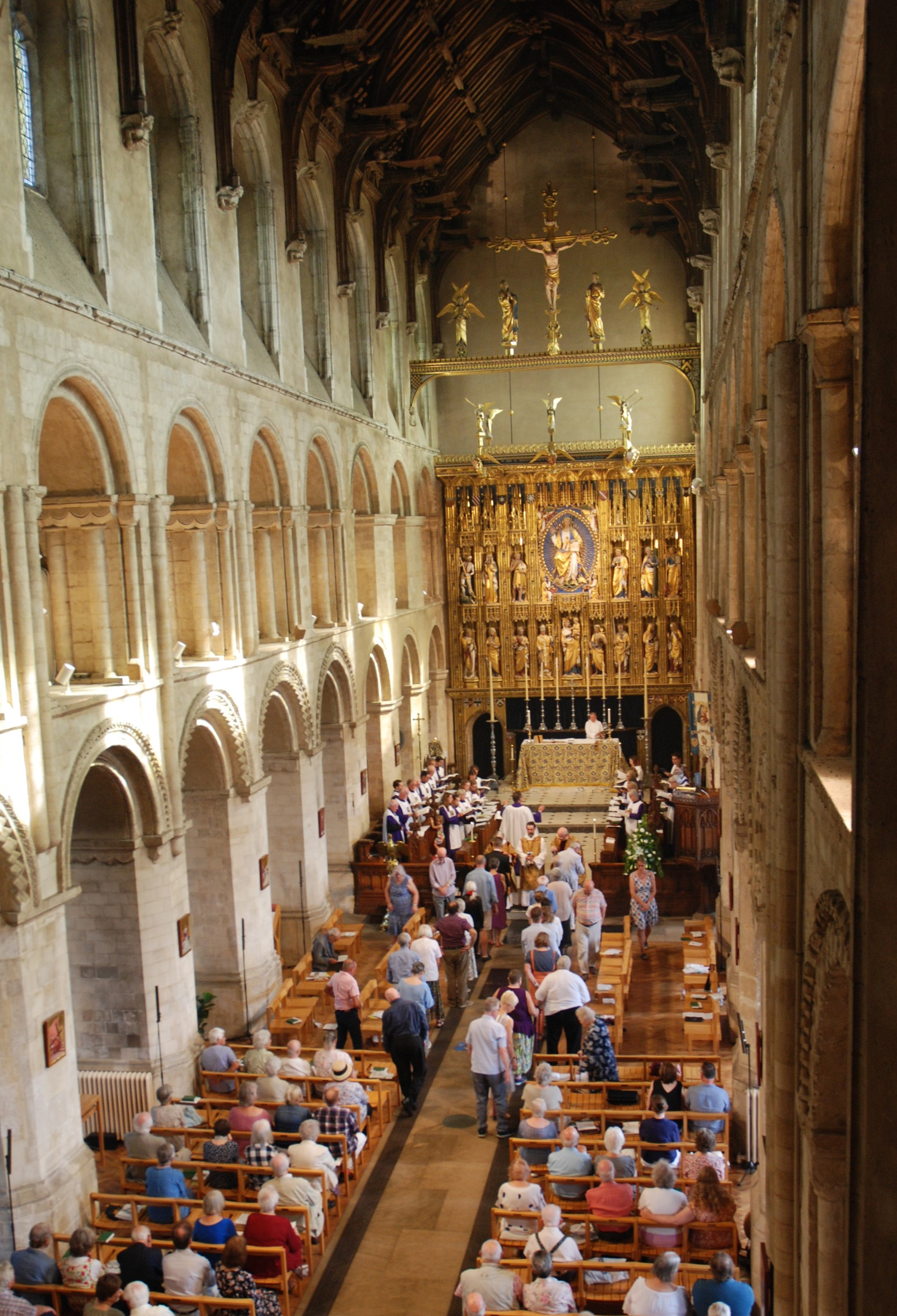
Sunday Sung Eucharist

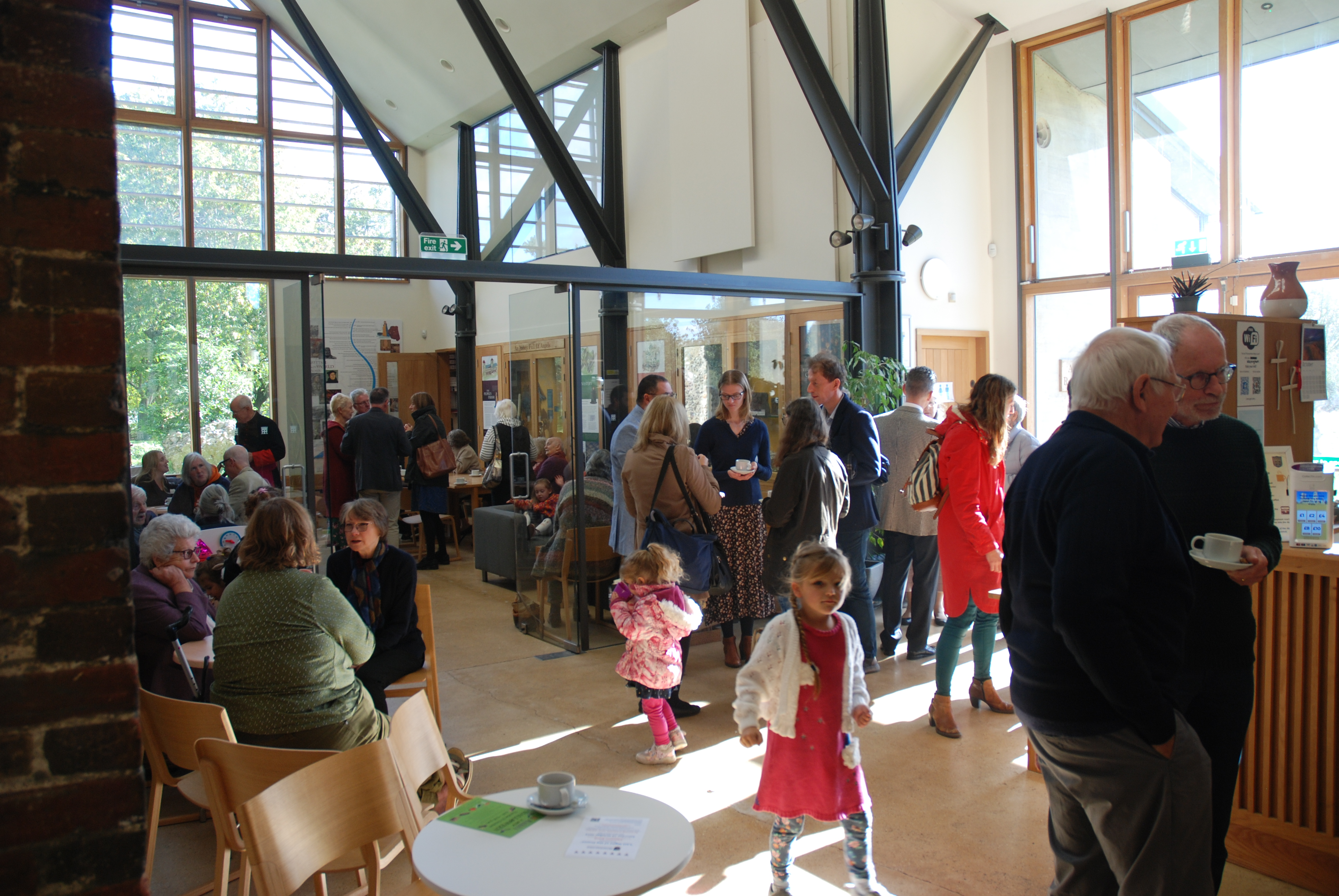
New facilities in St Benedict's meeting area

The Church of St Mary and St Thomas of Canterbury serves as the parish church of Wymondham. The Parish also incorporates the Victorian church of Holy Trinity in Spooner Row village nearby. A wide range of services for worship take place at the Abbey, including Sunday Sung Eucharist, Daily Morning Prayer and Evening Prayer. In 2016, with financial support from the Heritage Lottery Fund and local donors, new extensions were built at the east end. These provide display areas, comfortable social and refreshment facilities and vestries.

It is an active parish with a Friends group and a large group of welcomers and volunteers. There is much interest in the history of the building and parish, with a Preservation Trust and Hon. Archivist. The Parish Archives, some dating back to the 13th century, are housed in the parvise chamber above the porch. Early items include deeds, wills, inventories, a royal market charter of 1460, wardens' accounts, the parish Bede Roll of 1524 and records of the town's medieval religious gilds. The church also has a 1613 edition of the King James Bible. Selections of documents, artefacts and silver are displayed at the back of the church.

== Organs ==
Early records suggest that the parish had an organ in the late 1400s, and the church still has a guarantee for a new 'payre of orgons in ye quire' built by William Beton (or Bylton) of King's Lynn in 1523. Beton (d. 1553) later became royal court organ maker/tuner, building organs at Hampton Court, the Chapels Royal and Old St Paul's Cathedral . Today's handsome main organ was built in London by James Davis and installed here in 1793. It is housed in a fine Chippendale 'Gothick' style case on the gallery at the west end of the nave. The three-manual organ (with later addition of pedals) has been enlarged and rebuilt several times but retains most of its original 18th-century pipework. A specification of the organ can be found on the National Pipe Organ Register. A smaller chamber organ, also by James Davis and built in 1810, is located in the north aisle. 'The Organ' by David Baker (a former organist at the Abbey) is published by Shire Publications and contains a full description of the instrument, with many illustrations of its components. Wymondham Abbey has a tradition of excellence in choral music and welcomes singers of all ages.

A specification of the organ can be found on the National Pipe Organ Register.

=== List of organists ===
- Richard Sharp 1793 - 1801
- George Warnes 1828 - 1843
- Reuben Warnes 1844 - 1848
- Mrs Warnes 1849 - 1851
- George Church 1852 - 1857
- Horace Hill 1857 - 1867
- Arthur Glasspoole 1867 - 1880
- James Harcourt 1880 - 1881 (formerly organist of St Peter Mancroft, Norwich)
- Algernon Wilde 1882 - 1929
- L. Hemingway 1929 - 1930
- Geoffrey Palmer 1930 - 1946
- Winifred Stubbs 1940 - 1955
- N. Charleton-Burdon 1955 - 1956
- Robert Norton 1956 - 1957
- N. Charleton-Burdon 1957 - 1960
- Michael Bryan Hesford 1960 - 1964
- Norman Crowhurst 1964 - 1967
- Maxwell Betts 1967 - 1981
- Ralph Cupper 1981
- Denis Wright 1981 - 1988
- David Baker 1988 - 1995
- Howard Thomas (Director of Music) 1995 - 2012
- John Lakin 1995 - 2012
- Robert Goodrich (Director of Music) 2012 – 2020
- Mike Webb 2012–2020 (Hon.)
- Robert Goodrich (Director of Music) 2023–present
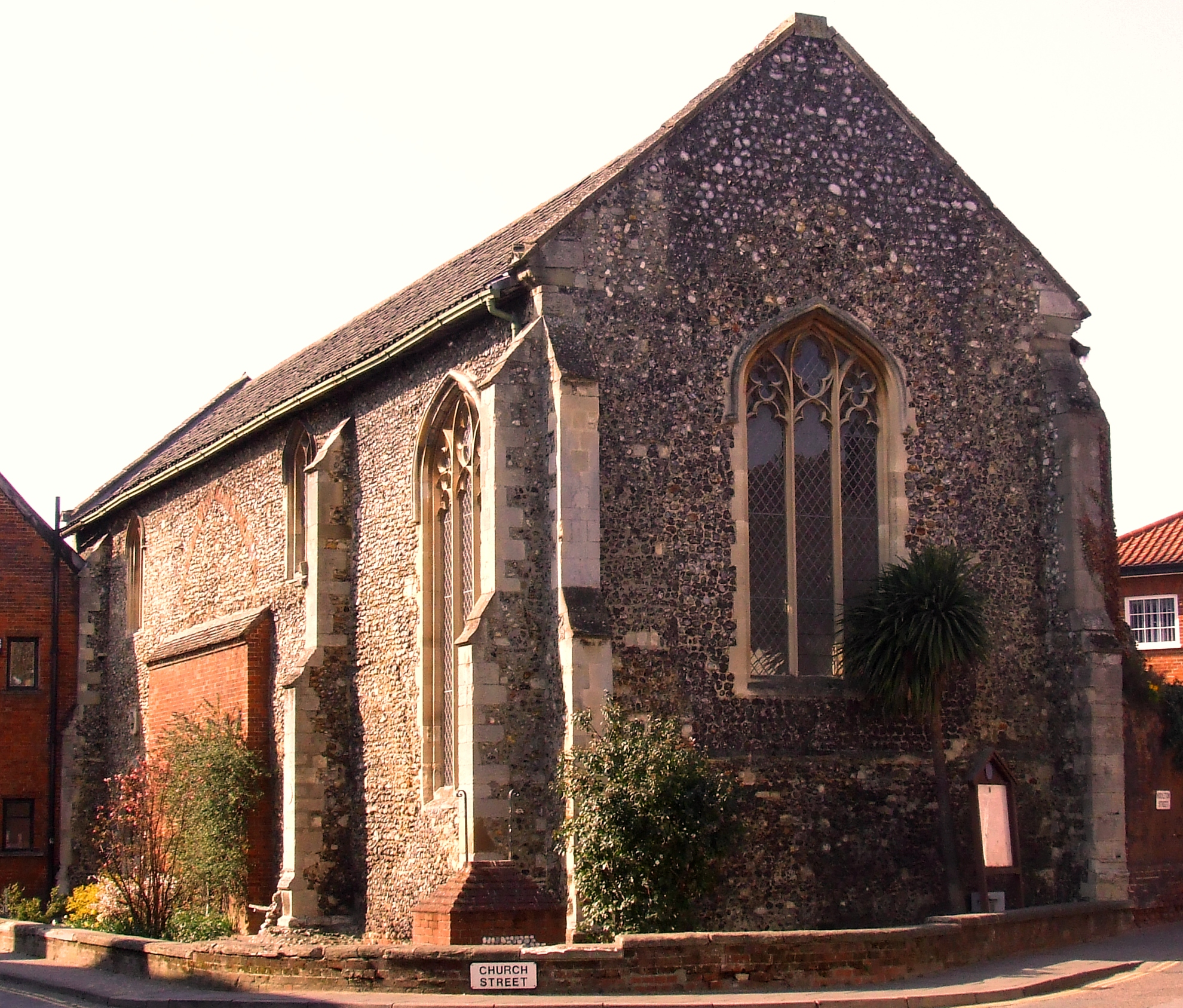
Becket's Chapel

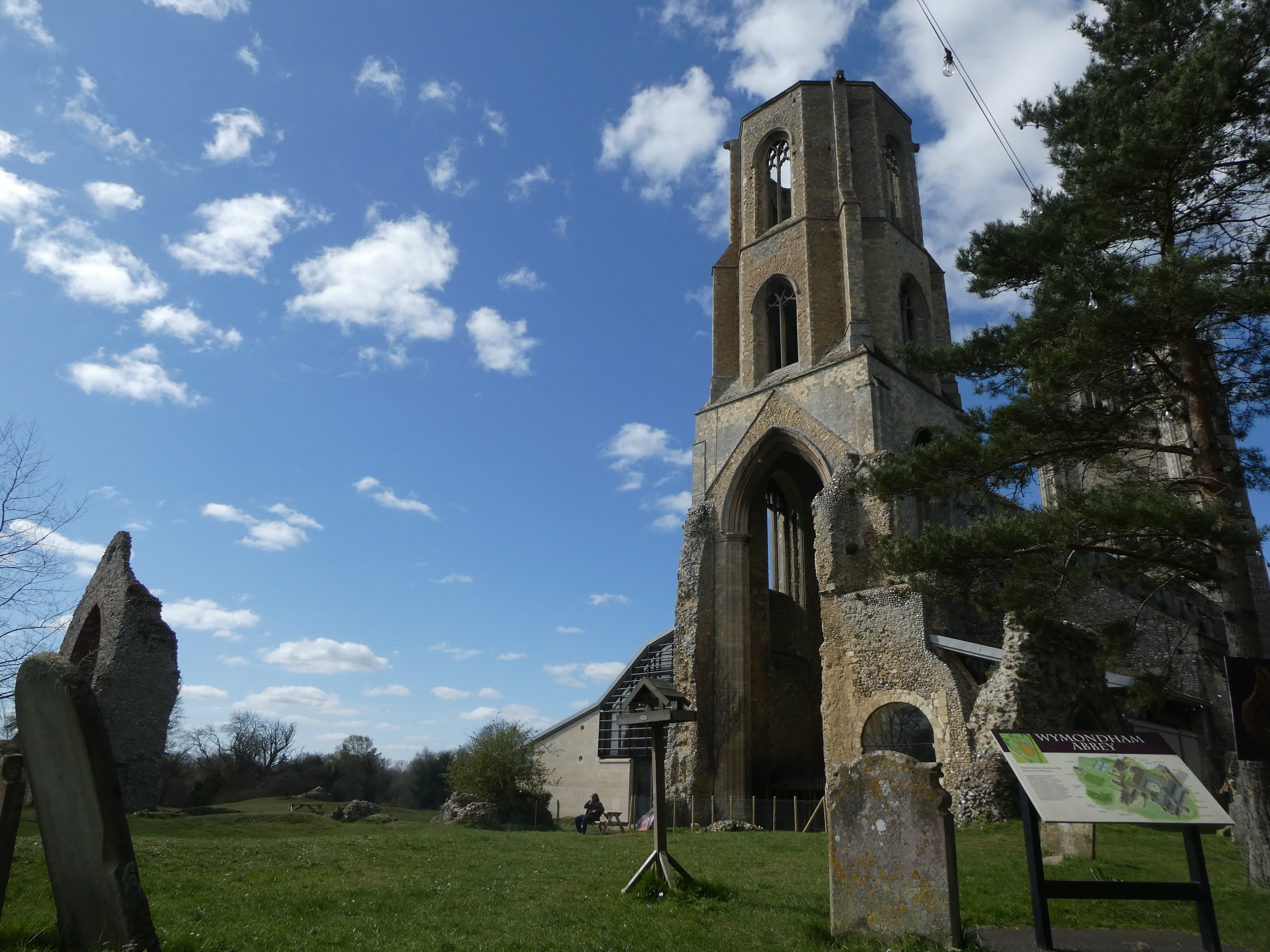
The ruined East Tower as seen from inside the grounds

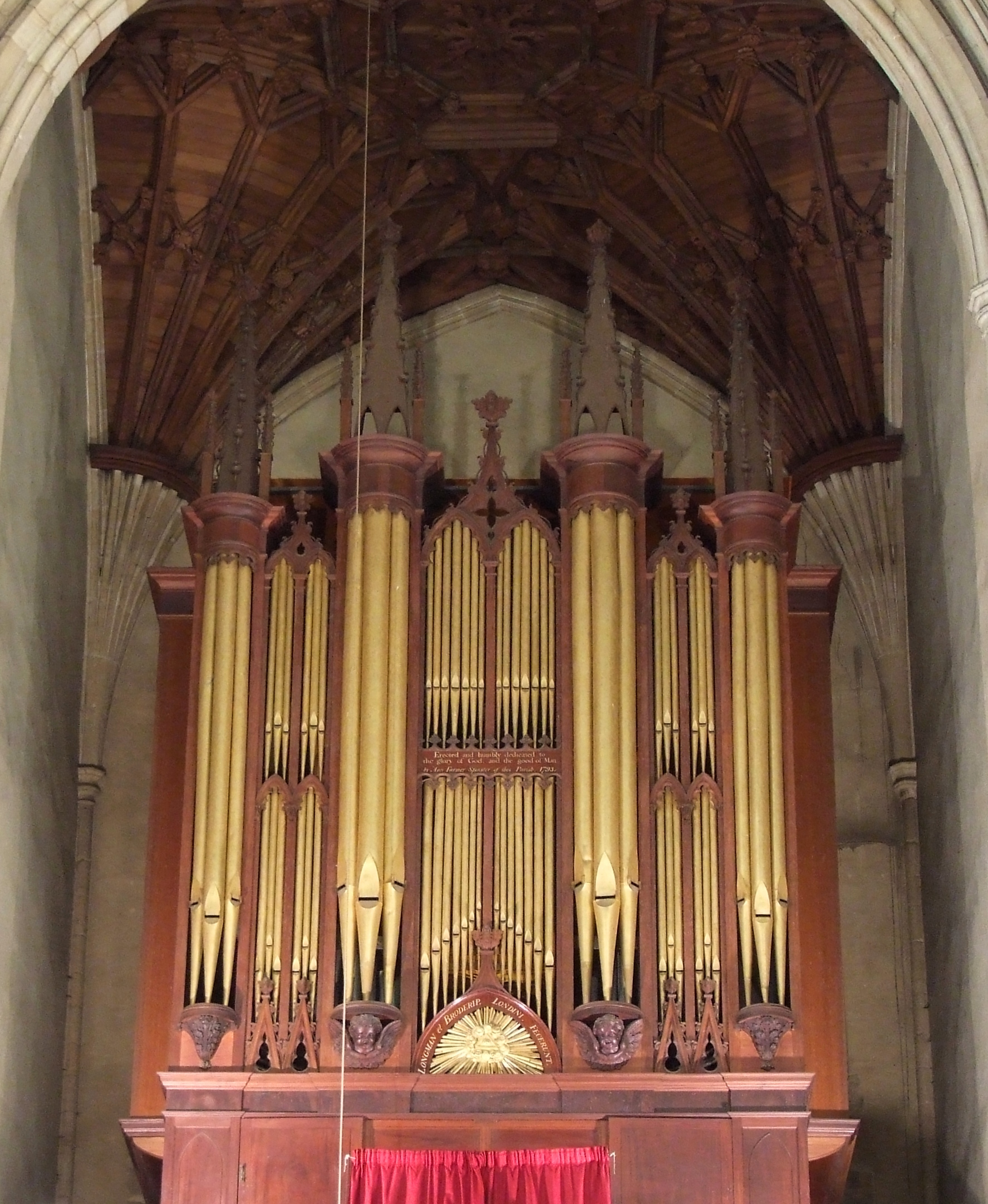
The 1793 organ by James Davis

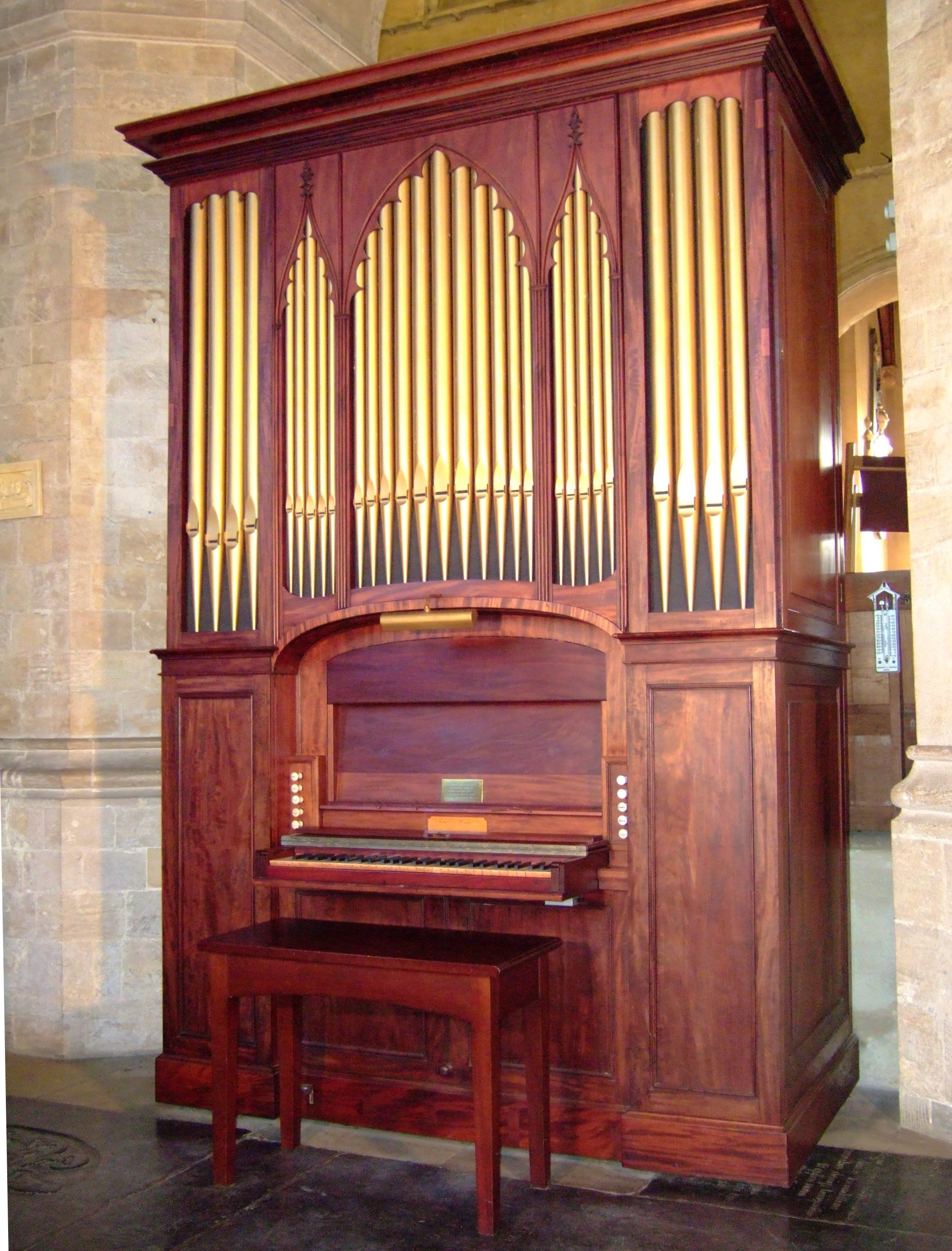
1810 Chamber organ

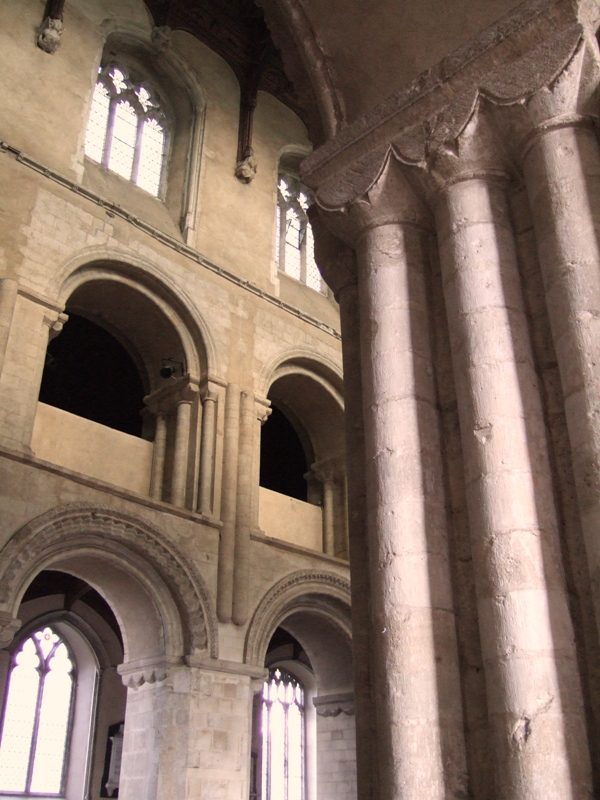
Pillars in the nave, some of which were "squared off" in the 1580s

== See also ==
- List of English abbeys, priories and friaries serving as parish churches
