= Freddie Stockdale =

Opera impresario

- With his wife in his Eastwood mansion
- Born: Frederick Minshull Stockdale; 20 May 1947
- Died: 23 November 2018 (aged 71)
- Education: Eton College
- Alma mater: Jesus College, Cambridge
- Known for: Founding Pavilion Opera
- Political party: Democratic Labour (1973–81); SDP (1981–unknown)
- Spouse: Adele Mason

Frederick Minshull Stockdale (20 May 1947 – 23 November 2018) was a British opera impresario known for founding Pavilion Opera. He also wrote a number of fiction and non-fiction works with an opera theme.

== Early life and family ==
Stockdale was born in 1947, the younger son of Sir Edmund Villiers Minshull Stockdale, Lord Mayor of London from 1959 to 1960. He was educated at Eton College and Jesus College, Cambridge, where he obtained a degree in law.

His first marriage was dissolved and his second was to Adele Mason who sings lead soprano in opera.

== Career ==
Despite his law degree, Stockdale never practised, being better known as an impresario and author. He built an opera pavilion in the garden of his house in Lincolnshire, Thorpe Tilney Hall, and in 1981 launched the touring company Pavilion Opera. The company closed in July 2018. After Lincolnshire, Stockdale moved to East Sussex where his plans for the renovation of Eastwood Farm by Robert Adam were approved on appeal.

His writing career included fiction and non-fiction works with an opera theme. He wrote several detective novels under the pen name John Gano.

== Politics ==
Politically, Stockdale was a supporter of the former Labour Party MP Dick Taverne, and became associated with his Democratic Labour Association in the aftermath of the Lincoln by-election in 1973. He was elected as an Independent on to Lincolnshire County Council in 1977, representing East Kesteven no. 2 division. In the 1979 general election he stood as the Democratic Labour candidate in Lincoln, where he came fourth with 4.1 per cent of the vote. The sitting Labour MP, Margaret Jackson, who had defeated Taverne in the October 1974 general election, lost the seat; however, the victorious Conservative Party candidate Kenneth Carlisle won with a majority over Labour of just 602 votes, which was considerably less than the 1,743 votes polled by Stockdale. In an analysis of the voting in the election, Ivor Crewe, Director of the British Election Study, stated that the presence of Stockdale (and fellow Democratic Labour candidate Cyril Nottingham in Brigg and Scunthorpe) "splintered enough of the Labour vote... to allow the Conservatives to gain both seats".

Stockdale joined the Social Democratic Party (SDP) on its foundation in 1981, and stood again in Lincoln as its candidate in the general election two years later, achieving 25 per cent of the vote and third place.

== Death ==
Stockdale died in 2018.

== Selected publications ==
- The Opera Guide. Collins & Brown, London, 1990. (With M.R. Dreyer) ISBN 185585080X
- Figaro Here, Figaro There: Pavilion Opera: An Impresarioʾs Diary. John Murray, 1991. ISBN 0719549701
- The Bridgwater Sale. Doubleday, London, 1993. ISBN 0385404026
- Criminal Conversations. Doubleday, London, 1994. ISBN 0385404034
- Affairs of State. Doubleday, London, 1995. ISBN 0385406347
- Emperors of Song: Three Great Impresarios. John Murray, London, 1998. ISBN 071955702X
