= Branston and Heighington railway station =

Former railway station in Lincolnshire, England

Coordinates: 53.21038°N 0.46323°W

Branston and Heighington
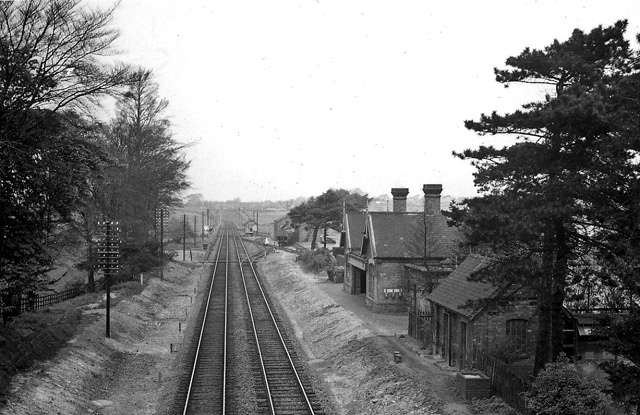
- The station in 1961

General information
- Location: Heighington, North Kesteven; England
- Platforms: 2

Other information
- Status: Disused

History
- Original company: Great Northern and Great Eastern Joint Railway
- Pre-grouping: Great Northern and Great Eastern Joint Railway
- Post-grouping: London and North Eastern Railway

Key dates
- 1 August 1882: Opened as Heighington for Branston
- 1 May 1884: Renamed Branston and Heighington
- 3 November 1958: Closed for passengers
- 7 December 1964: closed for goods
Location

Branston and Heighington is a disused railway station in Lincolnshire, England, situated between the villages of Branston and Heighington. Its site was located on the former Great Northern and Great Eastern Joint Railway line between Lincoln and Sleaford.

Preceding station	Historical railways	Following station
Lincoln Central Line and station open	Great Northern and Great Eastern Joint Railway	Potterhanworth Line open, station closed

== History ==
=== Opening ===
The station was opened by the Great Northern Railway (GNR) on 1 August 1882 as part of a rural branch line connecting Lincoln to Sleaford. It featured two platforms, a small brick station building, and a goods yard catering to local agricultural freight.

Branston and Heighington became an important stop for farmers and small-scale industries in the area, particularly for transporting grain and livestock to market. Passenger services were relatively modest but provided vital connections for local residents before widespread car ownership.

=== Decline and Closure ===
After the 1923 Grouping, the station became part of the London and North Eastern Railway (LNER), and later came under the control of British Railways following nationalisation in 1948. Passenger numbers began to decline post-World War II, and the station was earmarked for closure under the Beeching cuts.

Branston and Heighington railway station officially closed to passengers on 15 June 1963, and to freight services shortly thereafter on 5 October 1964. The line through the station was later dismantled.

=== Present day ===
Little remains of the station today. The platforms have been demolished, and the former station building was converted into a private residence in the late 1970s. A short stretch of the former track bed is now used as a public footpath.
