= David Baker (academic and musician) =

Academic, musician and writer

David Baker FCILIP FCMI FRCO FRSA

Deputy Chair of Jisc
- In office 2009–2012

Principal and Chief Executive of Plymouth Marjon University
- In office 2003–2009

Pro Vice Chancellor of the University of East Anglia
- In office 1997–2003

Personal details
- Education: Sidney Sussex College, Cambridge; King's College, London; Loughborough University; The Open University

David Michael Baker (born 24 August 1952) is a British academic, musician and writer specialising in the field of library & information science (LIS). He holds an Emeritus Chair in Strategic Information Management from Plymouth Marjon University, where he was formerly principal. He has held a number of academic posts and has written widely in the fields of LIS and musicology.

== Life and career ==
Baker was born in 1952 and was raised in Bradford. He gained his ARCO at the age of 16, becoming FRCO the following year. He then pursued a degree in music at Sidney Sussex College, Cambridge, where he was also organ scholar, graduating with a first-class BA degree in 1973 (as per tradition, his BA was promoted to MA in 1977). He subsequently studied for an MMus degree at King's College, London. He then graduated from Loughborough University with an MLS in 1977 and a PhD in 1988, and from the Open University in 2002 with an MBA.

After graduation, Baker held several librarian and lecturer posts at various universities, before moving to the University of East Anglia (UEA) where he was in turn Chief University Librarian, Director of Information Services and Pro-Vice-Chancellor for Academic Infrastructure and Human Resources. Following his time at UEA, he was appointed Principal and Chief Executive of Plymouth Marjon University (then the University of St Mark and St John, Plymouth) in 2003. Under his leadership, the university was awarded university college status in 2007 with taught degree awarding powers. He held this post until 2009, when he became Deputy Chair of Jisc, notably chairing the Transition Board that turned Jisc from a public to a private sector organisation. Baker has also led a large number of high-level, international consultancies with a specialism in academic library provision, strategic information management and human resources.

Baker has remained active as an organist throughout his career. From 1988 to 1995 he was organist of Wymondham Abbey, and he is currently organist and choirmaster of St. Michael's Church, Mytholmroyd. In 2011 he founded the Halifax Organ Academy, based at Halifax Minster. He is also Chair of the Corporate Board of the Institute of Contemporary Music Performance.

== Selected publications ==
- Geoffrey Tristram: A Very British Organist: “I am he”. AuthorHouse, 2022.
- Libraries, Digital Information, and Covid: Practical Applications and Approaches to Challenge and Change. Oxford: Chandos, 2021.
- John Varley Roberts: Organ Music. Fitzjohn Music Publications, 2020.
- Future Directions in Digital Information: Predictions, Practice, Participation. Oxford: Chandos, 2020.
- William Herschel: Organ Music. Fitzjohn Music Publications, 2017–18.
- Leading Libraries: The View from Above. London: SCONUL, 2017.
- Leading Libraries: The View from Beyond. London: SCONUL, 2017.
- Leading Libraries: Leading in Uncertain Times: A Literature Review. London: SCONUL, 2017.
- Innovation (Advances in Library Administration and Organisation, 35). Bradford: Emerald, 2016.
- The End of Wisdom. Oxford: Chandos, 2017.
- Digital Information Strategies: from Applications and Content to Libraries and People. Oxford: Chandos, 2015.
- Handbook of Digital Library Economics. Oxford: Chandos, 2013.
- Trends, Discovery and People in the Digital Age. Oxford: Chandos, 2013.
- Libraries and Society: Role, Social Responsibility and Future Challenges. Oxford: Chandos, 2010.
- Eve on Top: Women and the Experience of Success in the Public Sector. Oxford: Chandos, 2010.
- Digital Library Economics. Oxford: Chandos, 2009.
- Strategic change management in public sector organisations. Oxford: Chandos, 2007.
- The strategic management of technology: a guide for library and information services. Oxford: Chandos, 2004.
- Resource management in academic libraries. London: Library Association Publishing, 1997.
- The organs of Wymondham Abbey: a history and description. Wymondham: Friends of Wymondham Abbey, 1996.
- Essays for EF. Norwich, Solen Press, 1994.
- Hymns and hymn singing: a popular guide. Norwich: Canterbury Press, 1993.
- Making a proposal under the CEC Action Plan for Libraries: a Workbook... London: The British Library, 1992 (British Library Information Guide, 14).
- Training in library management, (Library Association Training Guideline 9). London: Library Association, 1991.
- The Organ. London: Shire Publications, 1991.
- Training and education of library technicians and assistants. Bradford: MCB Press, 1987.
- What about the workers? A study of non-professional staff in librarianship. London: Association of Assistant Librarians, 1986.
- Student reading needs: Aspects and prospects: A collection of essays. London: Library Association Publishing, 1986.
- Training library assistants, (Library Association Training Guideline, 6). London: Library Association Publishing, 1986.
- Leicester University Library: A history to 1961. Leicester: Leicester University Library, 1984.
- Junior staff training: Papers read at a meeting of the East Midlands Branch of the University, College and Research Section of the Library Association held on 26th March, 1980 at Leicester University Library. Leicester: University College and Research Section of the Library Association, East Midlands Branch, 1980.
