= Potterhanworth Booths =

Hamlet in the North Kesteven district of Lincolnshire, England

Coordinates: 53.197447°N 0.394702°W

- Location within Lincolnshire
- OS grid reference: TF073679
  - London: 115 mi (185 km) S
- District: North Kesteven
- Shire county: Lincolnshire
- Region: East Midlands
- Country: England
- Sovereign state: United Kingdom
- Post town: LINCOLN
- Postcode district: LN4
- Dialling code: 01522
- Police: Lincolnshire
- Fire: Lincolnshire
- Ambulance: East Midlands
- UK Parliament: Sleaford and North Hykeham

Potterhanworth Booths is a hamlet in the North Kesteven district of Lincolnshire, England. It is situated 6 miles (10 km) south-east from Lincoln, and at the junction of the B1202 and B1190 roads.

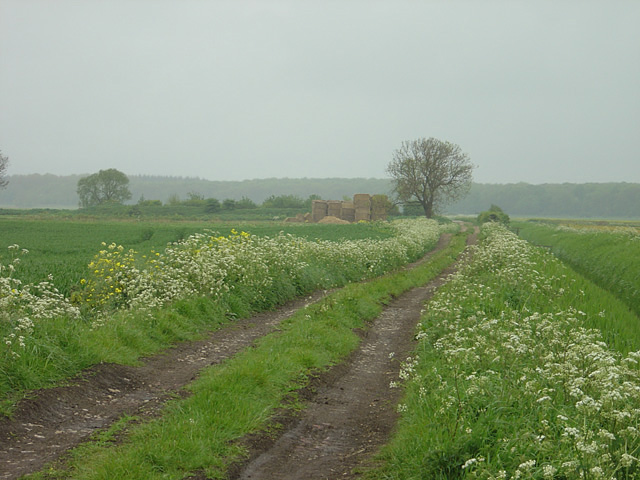
Potterhanworth Fen

The hamlet has a population of about 30, and is within the civil parish of Potterhanworth. It is adjacent to Potterhanworth Fen to the south-east. Potter Hanworth Wood, a Site of Special Scientific Interest, is 700 yards (640 m) to the south.

Potterhanworth Booths takes its name from the village of Potterhanworth, 1.5 miles (2.4 km) to the south-west, whose name refers to the early clay industries set up in the local area.

== History ==
Bronze Age round barrows and spear heads have been found in the village, and there are signs that Potterhanworth Booths was farmed during the Iron Age.

Potterhanworth Booths and Branston Booths were both settled by the Romans. At Potterhanworth Booths, remains of Roman field boundaries and enclosures, as well as worked iron, a quern, millstones and coins have been found.
