= Great Yarmouth Minster =

Church in Great Yarmouth, Norfolk, England

Coordinates: 52.6114°N 1.7273°E

The Minster Church of St Nicholas, Great Yarmouth
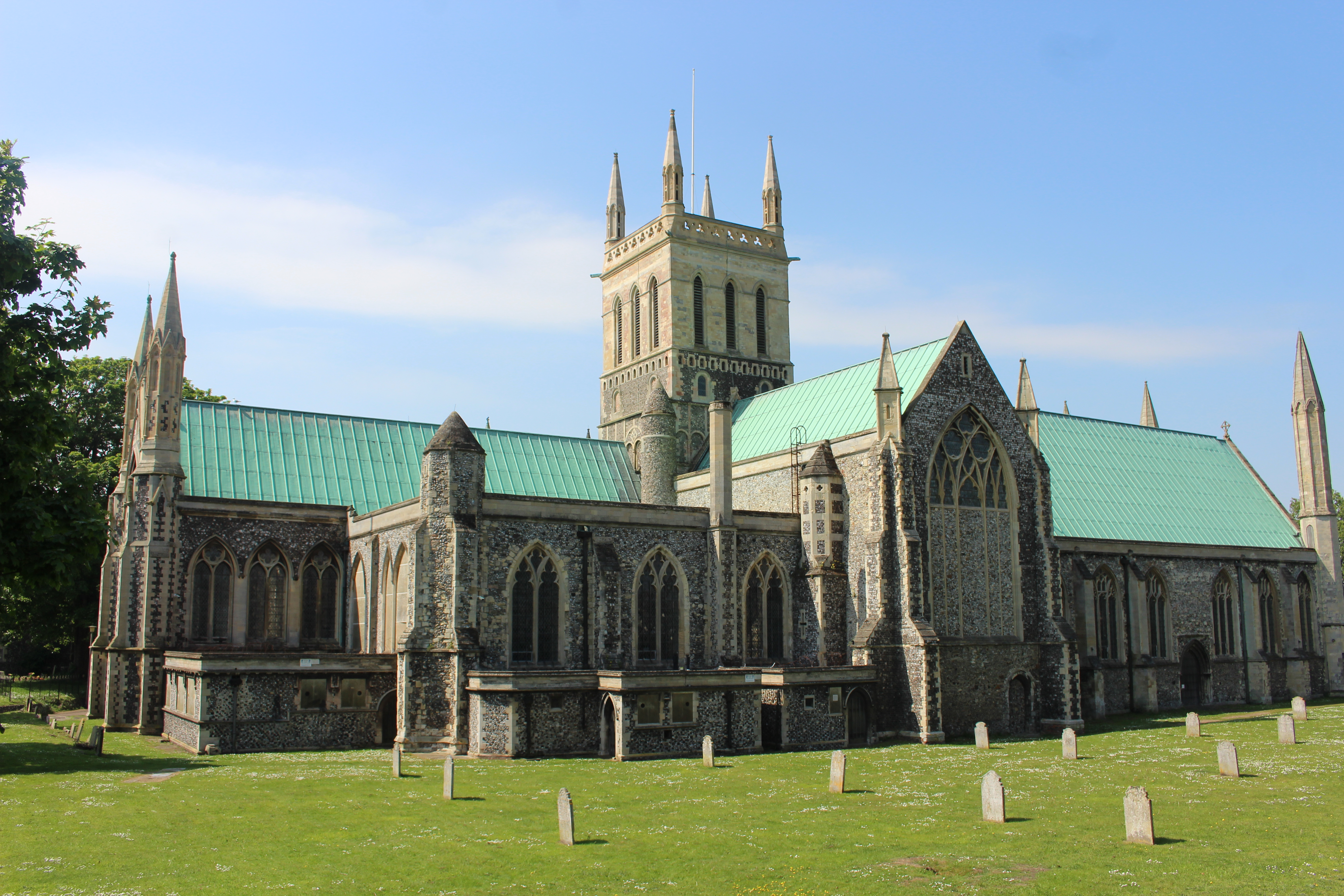
- Great Yarmouth Minster, from the north
- The Minster Church of St Nicholas, Great Yarmouth
- Denomination: Church of England
- Previous denomination: Roman Catholic
- Churchmanship: Modern Liberal Anglo-Catholic
- Website: www.gtyarmouthminster.org

History
- Founded: 1101
- Founder: Herbert de Losinga
- Dedication: St Nicholas
- Consecrated: 1119

Administration
- Province: Canterbury
- Diocese: Norwich
- Archdeaconry: Norfolk
- Deanery: Great Yarmouth
- Parish: Great Yarmouth

Clergy
- Rector: Revd Simon Ward
- Vicar: Revd Richard Washington

The Minster Church of St Nicholas is the minster and parish church of the town of Great Yarmouth, in Norfolk, England. It was built during the Norman era and is England's third largest parish church, behind Beverley Minster in East Yorkshire (37,560 square feet; 3,489 m^{2}) and Christchurch Priory in Dorset (30,300 square feet; 2,815 m^{2}). It was founded in 1101 by Herbert de Losinga, the first Bishop of Norwich, and consecrated in 1119. It is cruciform, with a central tower, which may preserve a part of the original structure. Gradual alterations effectively changed the form of the building. Its nave is 26 feet (7.9 m) wide, and the church's total length is 236 feet (72 m).

In December 2011, the Bishop of Norwich officially designated it a Minster Church. It is not only used for religious services but is a hub for various other regional and civic events, including concerts by choirs, orchestras and other musical ensembles, art exhibitions and, during festivals and fayres, the church opens permitting stalls and traders inside. It is also a Grade-II* listed building.

It is listed on the Heritage at Risk Register with a Priority Grade of A, indicating an immediate risk of further rapid deterioration or loss of historic fabric, with a solution having not been agreed nor implemented.

== The building ==
The building, very possibly the town's oldest, is also its most visible, historic landmark. It sits in the central area of Great Yarmouth, close to the house of Anna Sewell. The Transitional clerestoried nave, with columns alternately octagonal and circular, was rebuilt in the reign of King John. A portion of the chancel is of the same date. About fifty years later the aisles were widened, so that the nave is now, rather unusually, the narrowest part of the building. Immediately adjacent are two main graveyard areas: the Old Yard lies directly east behind the church, while the very substantial New Yard stretches for about half a mile to the north.

=== Priory school ===
Within the confines of the churchyard is the original priory school building now called the Priory Centre, which contains a café, support centre and information point. A new St Nicholas Priory Church of England VA Primary School stands nearby in the town centre.

== History ==
=== Early history ===
A grand west front with towers and pinnacles was constructed between 1330 and 1338, but a plague interrupted building extension plans. In the 16th century the ornamental brasses were cast into weights and the gravestones cut into grindstones. Within the church there were at one time 18 chapels, some maintained by guilds, others by private families, such as the Paxtons. At the Reformation the chapels were demolished and the building's valuable liturgical vessels sold off, the proceeds spent to widen the channel of the harbour.

=== Split church ===
During the Commonwealth period, the Independents appropriated the chancel, the Presbyterians the north aisle, while Churchmen were allowed the remainder of the building. The interior brick walls, erected at this time to separate the different portions of the building, remained until 1847. In 1864 the tower was restored, and the east end of the chancel rebuilt; between 1869 and 1870 the south aisle was rebuilt; and in 1884 the south transept, the west end of the nave and the north aisle underwent restoration.

=== Recent history ===
During the Second World War, the building was bombed and nearly destroyed by fire. It was rebuilt by the architect Stephen Dykes Bower and reconsecrated in 1961. During reconstruction, the church temporarily used St Peter's Church on St Peter's Road. When St Nicholas reopened, attendance at St Peter's declined until the 1960s, when a growing Greek community had use of it, and in 1981 it became St Spiridon's Greek Orthodox Church.

On 2 October 2011, the Lord Bishop of Norwich Graham James raised St. Nicholas to the status of a Minster Church, so marked on 9 December 2011 during the town's Civic Carol Service. Its formal title is now the Minster Church of St. Nicholas, Great Yarmouth.

On 13 October 2014, a memorial stone was unveiled to commemorate the deaths of thirteen people in the 1981 Bristow Helicopters Westland Wessex crash.

== Organ ==
The current pipe organ, obtained from St Mary The Boltons, in Brompton, London in 1960, replaced the former organ destroyed in the bombing of the Second World War. For its current specifications please refer to National Pipe Organ Register.

=== List of organists ===
- Dr. Musgrave Heighington, 1733–1746 (formerly organist of Holy Trinity Church, Hull, afterwards organist of St Martin's Church, Leicester)
- John Christian Mantel, 1748–1761
- Henry Cricheley, 1761–1790
- Richard Eaton, 1790–1793
- Isaac Lewis, 1793–1834
- Joseph Baxfield, 1834–1838
- Interregnum
- George Warne, 1843–1856 (formerly organist of Temple Church)
- Henry Stonex, 1856–1895
- Haydon Hare, F.R.C.O., 1895 – 1937 – 1944 (formerly organist of Bourne Abbey Church)
- Richard Humphrey
- John Farmer, B.A., A.R.C.O.,
- Paul Winston, 1990–1993
- Benjamin Angwin, M.A., 1961–1972
- David Price, F.R.C.O.(CHM) 1972–1976
- Alan Snow, A.R.C.O.
- Barry Waterlow, M.Mus.(Western Washington), A.R.C.C.O., A.Mus.L.C.M., L.Mus.L.C.M.; 2001–2005
- John Stephens, B.A.(Hons), M.Mus.(University of East Anglia), A.T.C.L.; 2006–2017
- Martyn Marshall 2017-

=== List of assistant organists ===
- Constance Mary Hinds, 1929–1940
- Peter Angwin, 1964–1966
- Peter Seaman, –1986
- Paul Winston, 1986–1990
- Peter Clifford. 1990–
- Christopher Myhill BSc. 1996–1999
- John Stephens, 1999–2001

== See also ==
- List of ecclesiastical restorations and alterations by J. L. Pearson

== Bibliography ==
Davies, Paul P. The Parish Church of St Nicolas Great Yarmouth. Great Yarmouth. p. 222. Archived from the original on 5 October 2011.
Davies, Paul P. The Priory and Parish Church of St Nicolas Great Yarmouth. A Historical Guide. Great Yarmouth. p. 48. Archived from the original on 5 October 2011.
