= Washingborough =

Village and civil parish in Lincolnshire, England

Coordinates: 53.222199°N 0.472821°W

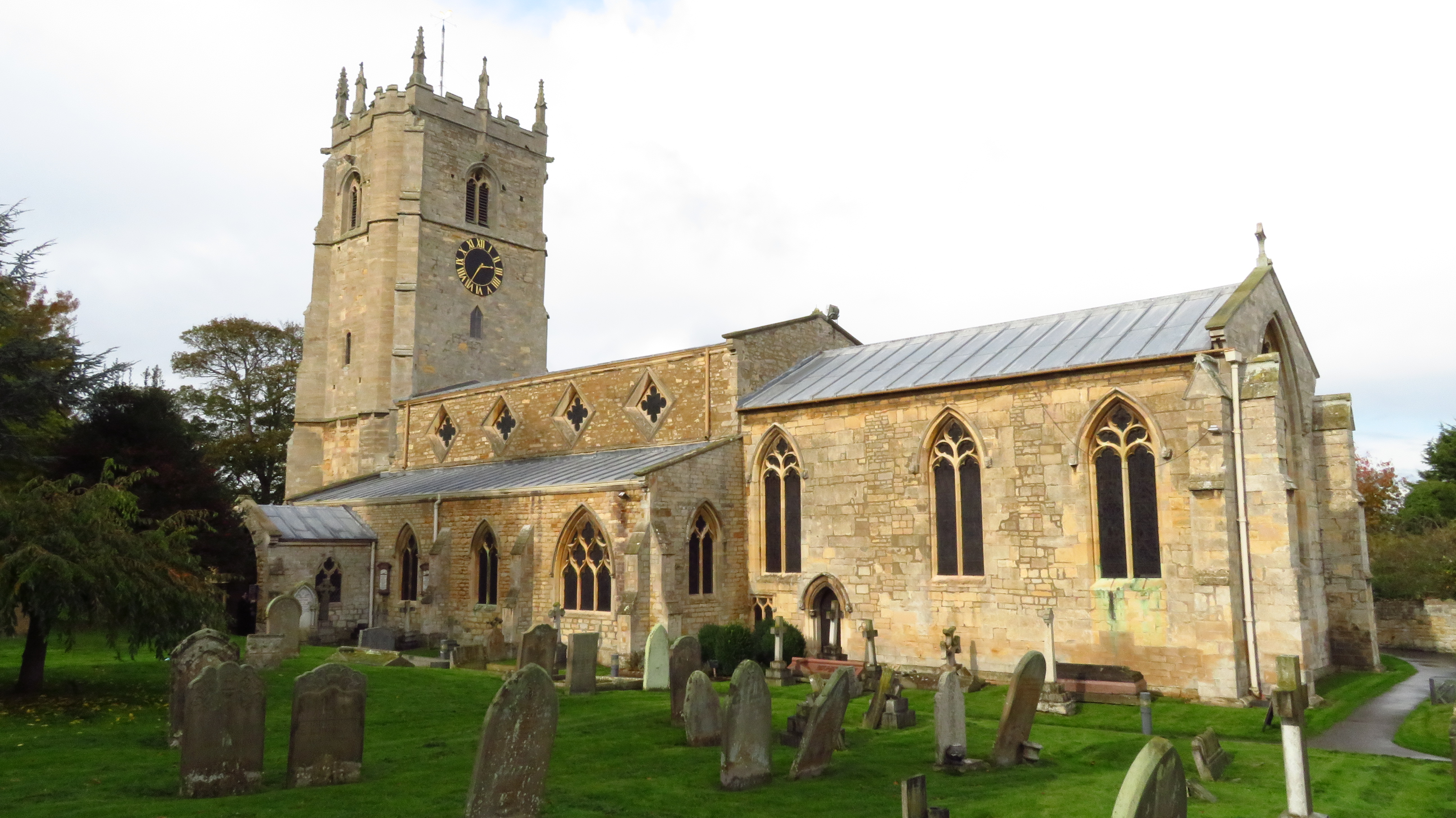
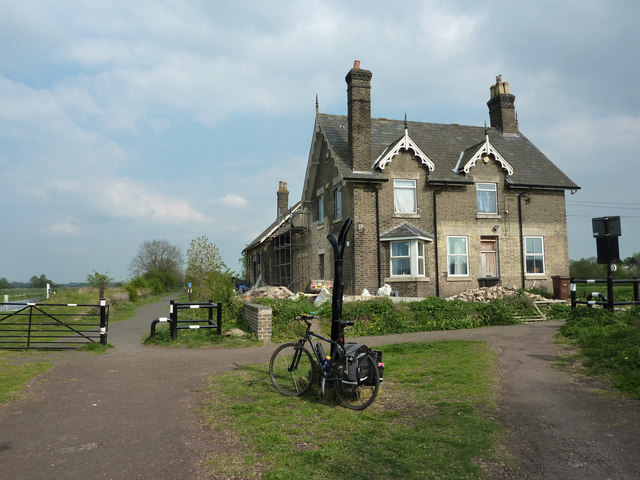
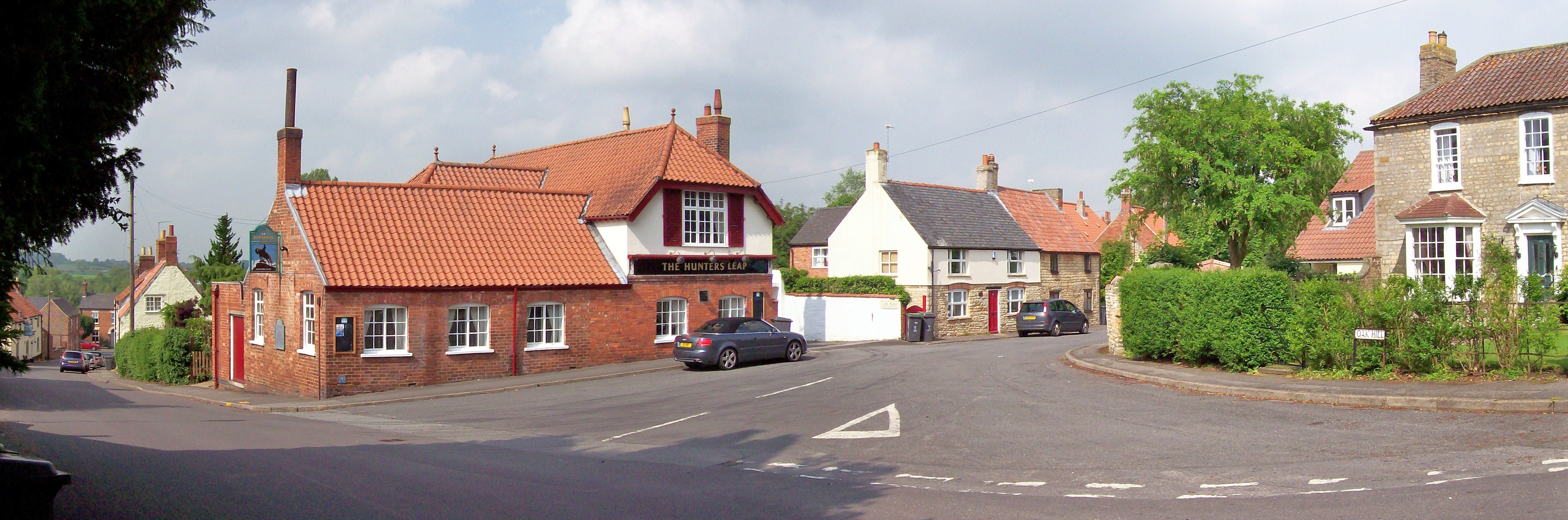
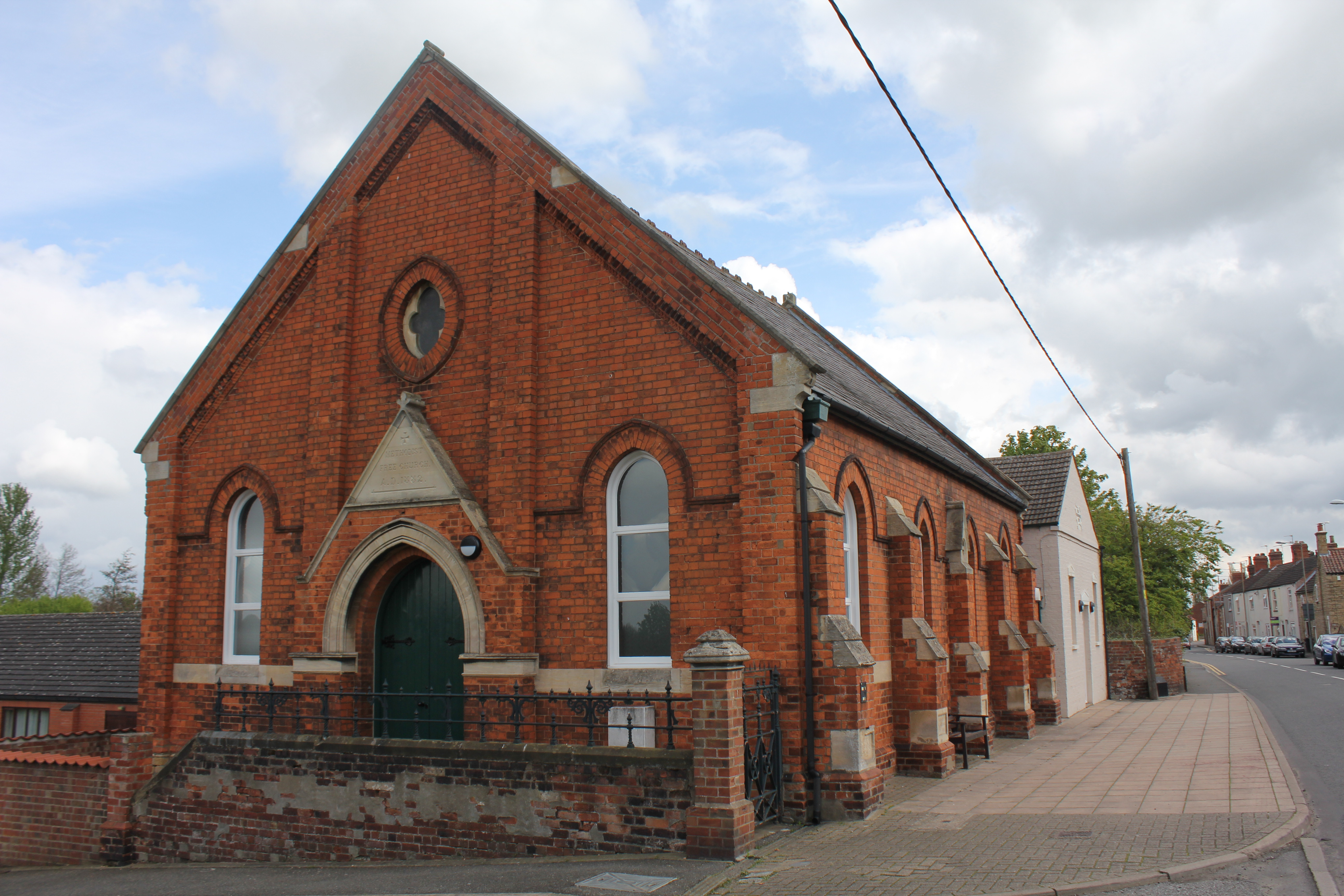
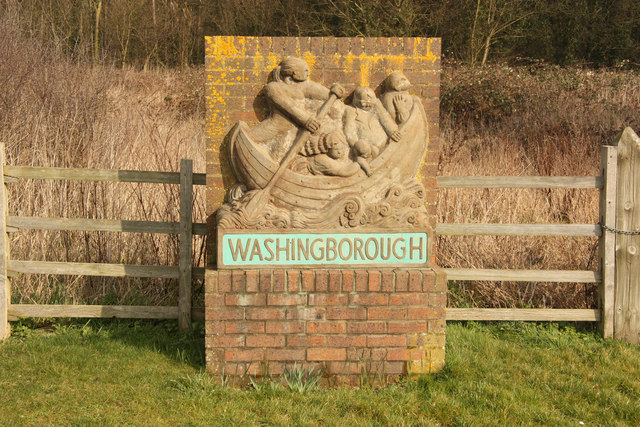
- Clockwise from top: Washingborough St John the Evangelist Church, Village Centre, Village Sign, Methodist Church on Main Road & former railway station

- Location within Lincolnshire
- Population: 6,385 (2021 Census BUA (includes Heighington))
  - London: 115 mi (185 km) S
- District: North Kesteven
- Shire county: Lincolnshire
- Region: East Midlands
- Country: England
- Sovereign state: United Kingdom
- Areas of the village: List: Branston Booths (Village); Common Square; Heighington (Village)
- Post town: LINCOLN
- Postcode district: LN4
- Dialling code: 01522
- Police: Lincolnshire
- Fire: Lincolnshire
- Ambulance: East Midlands
- UK Parliament: Sleaford and North Hykeham

Washingborough is a village and civil parish in the North Kesteven district of Lincolnshire, England. Located 3 miles (5 km) east of Lincoln and 18 miles (29 km) from Sleaford. The population in the 2001 census was 3,356, increasing to 3,482 at the 2011 census and 3,664 at the 2021 census. It is situated on the lower slopes of Lincoln Cliff limestone escarpment where the River Witham breaks through it. The south side of Lincoln Cathedral and its three towers can be seen from the village centre.

== Geography ==
Washingborough is the point on the River Witham at which the Lincolnshire Fens begin and it can be argued that the village is the most northerly to be located within the region. The Fens were first drained by the Romans and the Roman Car Dyke ran from Washingborough to the River Nene, near Peterborough. Today, the village forms a built-up area with the nearby village of Heighington which had a combined population of 6,385.

== History ==
The origin of the name 'Washingborough' is uncertain but is thought to mean either 'fortification near the wash' or 'fortification of the people of Wassa'.

There is a war memorial to the men of Heighington and Washingborough in the church.

A dig involving Channel 4's archaeological television programme Time Team, on a site adjacent to the modern canalised course of the River Witham, found evidence of an important late Iron Age settlement of around 1000 BC. At this time the river was tidal and the evidence suggests a trading and metal working centre with trading connections to northern Europe. Copper ore and ingots were found as well as evidence of smelting in crucibles. The settlement may have lost importance as water levels rose and the site became unsuitable. Much of the settlement site was destroyed when the river was canalised in the 18th century as part of the effort to drain the Fens.

The Witham Shield, dated to the Iron Age, was discovered nearby in 1826 and is now in the British Museum.

The village was served by the Lincolnshire Loop Line between Lincoln and Peterborough via Boston and Spalding. However, the station that served the village closed in 1940 to passengers and never reopened. The line closed to freight traffic in the 1970s and is now a trail called the "Water Rail Way" between Lincoln and Woodhall Junction.

== Churches ==
The parish church is dedicated to St John the Evangelist. The lower parts of the tower are Norman. Inside is a Norman font. Windows commemorate a Zeppelin raid on the village in 1916. The church is part of the Washingborough group of churches with Heighington and Canwick.

There is also an active Methodist Church on Main Road. The church dates from 1857 and is part of the wider Methodist Church circuit.

== Amenities ==
The village has two public houses, the Ferryboat on High Street and the Hunters Leap on Oak Hill, a Chinese and a pizza takeaway, fish and chip shop, supermarket and post office with chemists.

The Powell hut is the home of scouting and guiding in the village. The Peterborough to Lincoln Line passes through the south-west corner of the village.

== Education ==
Washingborough Academy is the village primary school. The school gained a good rating in their Ofsted reports in 2017, 2012 and 2009 inspection.

== Demographics ==
At the 2021 census, Washingborough's urban area had a population of 6,385. Of the findings, the ethnicity and religious composition of the ward was:

Washingborough: Ethnicity: 2021 Census
| Ethnic group | Population | % |
| White | 6,259 | 98% |
| Mixed | 65 | 1% |
| Asian or Asian British | 41 | 0.6% |
| Black or Black British | 13 | 0.2% |
| Other Ethnic Group | 10 | 0.2% |
| Total | 6,385 | 100% |

The religious composition of the ward at the 2021 Census was recorded as:

Washingborough: Religion: 2021 Census
| Religious | Population | % |
| Christian | 3,578 | 59.3% |
| Irreligious | 2,414 | 40% |
| Other religion | 13 | 0.2% |
| Hindu | 10 | 0.2% |
| Muslim | 8 | 0.2% |
| Buddhist | 6 | 0.2% |
| Jewish | 6 | 0.2% |
| Sikh | 3 | 0.1% |
| Total | 6,385 | 100% |
