= Potterhanworth =

Village and civil parish in the North Kesteven district of Lincolnshire, England

Coordinates: 53.18427°N 0.42299°W

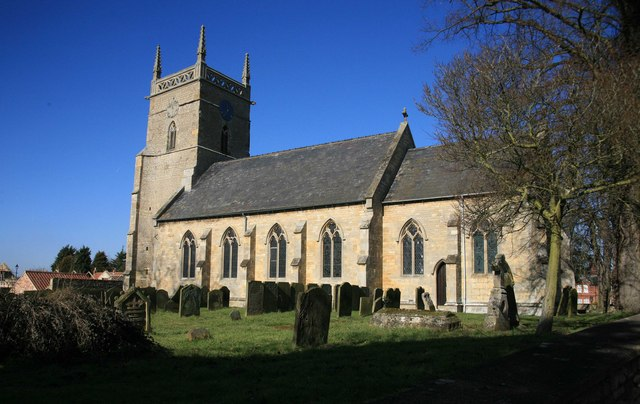
- St Andrew's Church, Potterhanworth

- Location within Lincolnshire
- Population: 839 (2011)
- OS grid reference: TF054663
  - London: 115 mi (185 km) S
- Civil parish: Potter Hanworth
- District: North Kesteven
- Shire county: Lincolnshire
- Region: East Midlands
- Country: England
- Sovereign state: United Kingdom
- Post town: LINCOLN
- Postcode district: LN4
- Dialling code: 01522
- Police: Lincolnshire
- Fire: Lincolnshire
- Ambulance: East Midlands
- UK Parliament: Sleaford and North Hykeham

Potterhanworth is a village and civil parish in the North Kesteven district of Lincolnshire, England. The population of the civil parish at the 2011 census was 839. It is situated 6 miles (10 km) south-east from Lincoln.

The hamlet of Potterhanworth Booths is part of the Potterhanworth civil parish. In the 2001 census the population of the whole parish was recorded as 648 in 257 households.

Potterhanworth appears in the Domesday survey as "Haneworde". In Old English this meant "Hana's homestead" or "Hana's farmstead". It is part of the "Langoe Wapentake". By 1334 it was known as Potter Hanworth because of the presence of a large pottery, and the two words did not coalesce until the 1950s. Some local people refer to the village as 'Potter'.

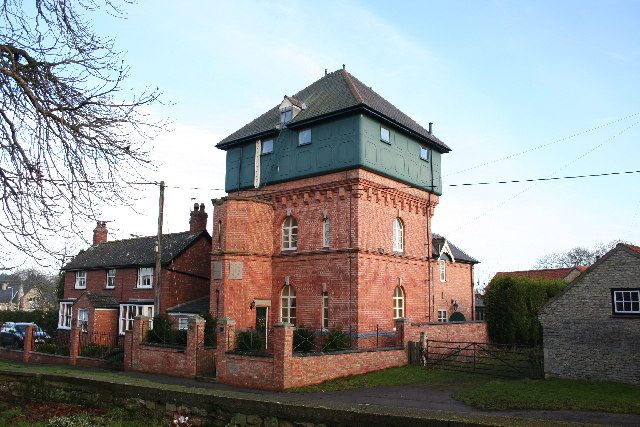
Potterhanworth Water Tower

The nearest settlements are Nocton to the south, Branston to the north-west, and Potterhanworth Booths to the north-east. The village is at the junction of the B1202 the B1178 roads. The Peterborough to Lincoln railway line passes 0.5 miles (0.8 km) to the west. On the B1202 to the east is a former POW camp. The parish includes land and Potterhanworth Fen to the south of the B1190 road to Bardney, to the point where this road meets the River Witham.

Close to the village there is a forest nature reserve and Site of Special Scientific Interest called Potterhanworth Wood.

There is little archaeology from Potterhanworth. A Neolithic axe was found less than a kilometre from the village. A fragment of Roman pottery and a Roman coin have been found, possibly relating to the nearby Roman settlement at Potterhanworth Booths.

The village commons were subject to enclosure by Act of Parliament in 1774.

From the early 20th century, on Cross Street, there was a post office with village store – now in residential use – which was later relocated to Middle Street. Potterhanworth had a bowls club, and a tennis club with courts, at the village sports' field; the field now contains a Lottery-funded play park. Previously, the village had two public houses: The Chequers and The Black Horse. Only The Chequers, on Cross Street, remains. There is a village hall, a church dedicated to St Andrew, a primary school, and a nine-hole golf course nearby on the road to Potterhanworth Booths. A previous water tower has been converted to a house. The village football team is Potterhanworth FC.
