= Haydon Hare =

British composer

Haydon William Hare FRCO (2 July 1869 – 22 April 1944) was a composer and organist based in Great Yarmouth.

== Life ==
He was born in Stamford, Lincolnshire, the first child of Thomas and Mary Ann Hare. He was educated at King's School, Peterborough, and was a chorister at the Peterborough Cathedral. He was an articled pupil to Dr. Haydn Keeton.

Haydon Hare was chorus master of the Norwich Musical Festival from 1908 to 1930 and conductor of the Yarmouth Musical Society from 1895 to 1939.

He was the organist in an early Henry Wood Promenade concert, when on 16 September 1909 he performed the Alexandre Guilmant Symphony Number 1 with the New Queen's Hall Orchestra under Henry Wood.

He married Amy Elizabeth Humphreys in August 1898 in St Mary's Church, Wainfleet, Lincolnshire. He died on 22 April 1944 in Great Yarmouth, and his wife died in 1964 - also in Great Yarmouth.

== Appointments ==
- Organist at Ryhall Church, Rutland, 1883–1885
- Organist at All Saints' Church, Stamford, 1885–1893
- Organist at Bourne Abbey church, 1893–1895
- Organist at St Nicholas' Church, Great Yarmouth, 1895–1944

== Compositions ==
He was a composer of:

- part songs
- a cantata, O God our help

Cultural offices
| Preceded by Henry Stonex | Organist of St Nicholas Church, Great Yarmouth; 1895–1944 | Succeeded by Richard Humphrey |
