= St John the Evangelist Church, Washingborough =

Church in Lincolnshire, England

St John's, Washingborough
- Washingborough St John the Evangelist
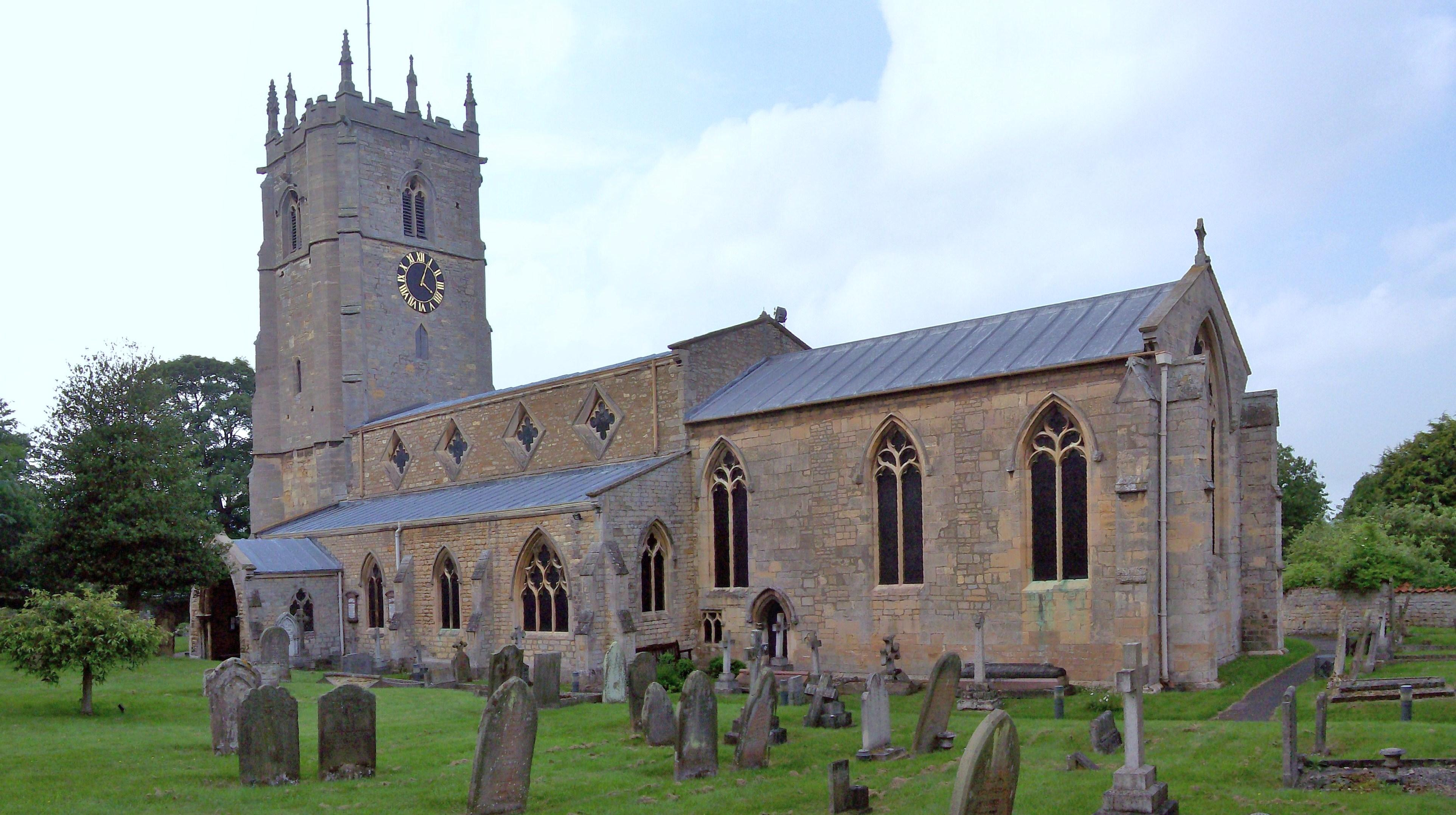
- St John's Church, Washingborough
- St John's, Washingborough
- 53.223025°N 0.475941°W
- OS grid reference: TF 01852 70632
- Location: Washingborough, Lincolnshire
- Country: England
- Denomination: Church of England
- Website: www.washingboroughgroup.org.uk

History
- Status: Active
- Founded: 1170
- Dedication: Saint John the Evangelist
- Dedicated: 1170
- Consecrated: 1170

Architecture
- Functional status: Active
- Heritage designation: Grade II*
- Designated: 1967
- Style: Norman/Georgian
- Completed: 1861

Clergy
- Rector: Fr Yüce Kabakçi

St John the Evangelist Church is the parish church of Washingborough in Lincolnshire, England.

== History ==
The church was built around 1170 and is likely to have replaced a much earlier structure on the site. It was restored between 1859 and 1861 by George Gilbert Scott and Henry Goddard and this saw extensive refurbishment, rebuilding and modernising of the entire church exterior and building. The church was used during World War I by Belgian refugees, who were accommodated at the nearby manor and painted a reredos in the church. The church also has some notable stained glass which Nicholas Antram, in his Lincolnshire volume in the Pevsner Buildings of England series, suggests may be by the firm of Clayton & Bell.

The churchyard was extended twice in its history and was given an entry point consisting of both piers and wrought iron gates in 1824. The church was given Grade II* listed building status in 1967.

== Present day ==
The church continues to serve both a place of worship and community hub for both residents and visitors.
