= James Harcourt (organist) =

English organist and composer

James Harcourt (27 October 1818 - 1883) was an English organist and composer.

== Education ==
He was apprenticed to Alfred Pettet at St Peter Mancroft in Norwich, and succeeded him in 1851.

He was also Conductor of Norwich Choral Society.

== Appointments ==
- Organist of St Stephen's Church, Norwich 1837 - 1839
- Organist of St Peter Mancroft 1851 - 1877
- Organist of Wymondham Abbey 1880 - 1881

== Compositions ==
- Sonata for Violin (or Concertina) and Pianoforte 1861
- Andante 1862
- Three Organ Movements 1863
