= Potterhanworth Wood =

Woodland in Lincolnshire, England

Coordinates: 53.18934°N 0.40004°W

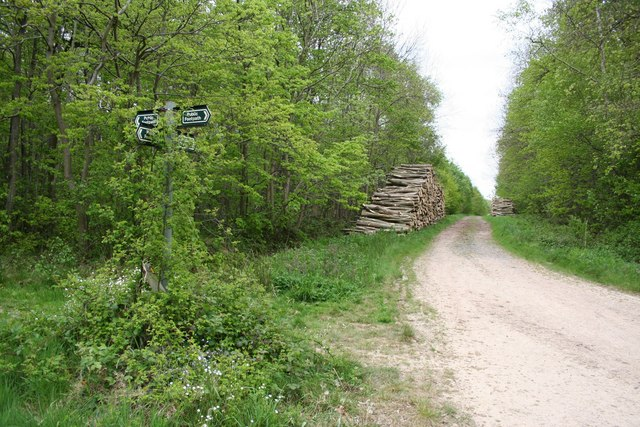
Footpath crossing in the wood

Potterhanworth Wood (grid reference TF070670) is a 32.0 hectare woodland, close to the village of Potterhanworth in North Kesteven, Lincolnshire, England. Potterhanworth was known as Potter Hanworth until the 1950s. The site was notified as a Site of Special Scientific Interest in 1968. The site is also listed in the Nature Conservation Review.

== Site description ==
Potterhanworth Wood is adjacent to the now drained fenland of the Witham Valley. The dominant canopy tree is small-leaved lime (Tilia cordata); in places the wood consists of pure stands of this species, but elsewhere a variety of other common trees occur. Historically, the site is known to have been continuously wooded and it has a long history of management using the coppice-with-standards technique.

Wild service-tree (Sorbus torminalis) is found in the wood. The ground flora contains a large number of ancient woodland indicator species.

18th-century enclosure maps of Potterhanworth show that the modern Potterhanworth Wood was then much larger consisting of Norman Hagg Wood in the south, Great Wood in the middle and Quern or Queen Dike Wood in the north.

== Invertebrates ==
The poplar lutestring moth occurs here.

== Birds ==
The wood supports a breeding bird community characteristic of ancient woodlands, including woodcock, and it also contains a small heronry.
