= Timberland, Lincolnshire =

Village in the North Kesteven district of Lincolnshire, England

Coordinates: 53.1116°N 0.3291°W

Timberland
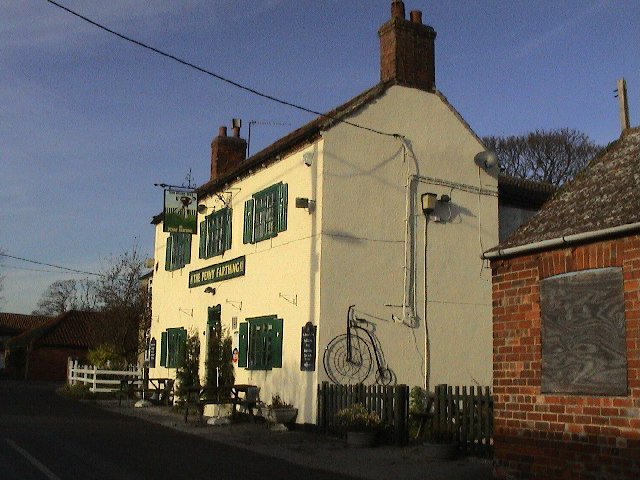
- The Penny Farthing Inn, Timberland

- Location within Lincolnshire
- Population: 578 (2011)
- OS grid reference: TF1258
  - London: 125 mi (201 km) S
- District: North Kesteven
- Shire county: Lincolnshire
- Region: East Midlands
- Country: England
- Sovereign state: United Kingdom
- Post town: LINCOLN
- Postcode district: LN4
- Dialling code: 01526
- Police: Lincolnshire
- Fire: Lincolnshire
- Ambulance: East Midlands
- UK Parliament: Sleaford and North Hykeham

Timberland is a village in the North Kesteven district of Lincolnshire, England. The population of the civil parish (including Thorpe Tilney) at the 2011 census was 578. It is situated 12 miles (19 km) north-east from Sleaford, 12 miles (19 km) south-east from Lincoln and on the Timberland Fen. Its closest neighbouring village is Martin, less than 1 mile (1.6 km) to the north.

== History ==
Genealogical records began around the 17th century showing that Timberland was a medieval village, possibly a small market town. The parish church is dedicated to St Andrew, and its parish records date back even further, to 1563.

The village Scopwick and Timberland railway station is now closed.

== Geography ==
Timberland is situated near the Car Dyke, which used to be navigable. The village is 6 miles (10 km) west from Tattershall, 9 miles (14 km) north-east from Sleaford, and 5 miles (8 km) south-west from Woodhall Spa.

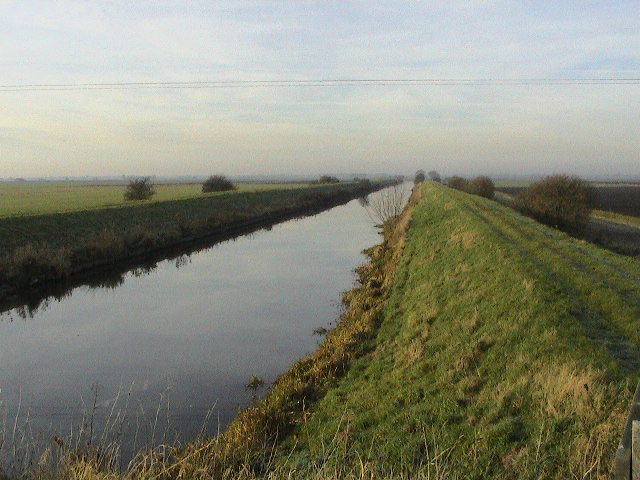
Timberland Delph

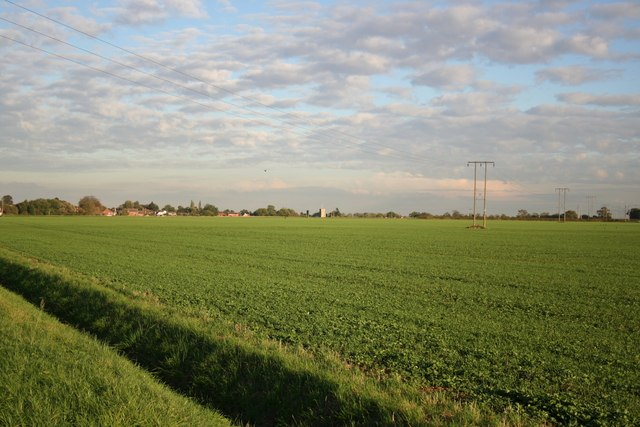
View eastwards towards the village

Set within a patchwork of fields in the wetlands of the Lincolnshire Fens, the village is just south of the River Witham and near to the village of Martin. The illustrated signpost with the town name has a plaque above showing the nearby Car Dyke waterway which was once navigable but later drained by small canals to make the surrounding land suitable for farm use.

Thorpe Tilney Hall is to the south-west. It was used as a setting for the BBC's 1980 Pride and Prejudice as Longbourn Hall.

The parish boundary with Walcott crosses the B1189 at Thorpe Tilney, part of the parish, to the south. To the west it meets Digby, then further north meets Scopwick, crosses the B1191, and follows the north-south Sleaford-Lincoln railway. It meets Martin, and the boundary passes eastwards, just south of the Metheringham Airfield Visitor Centre. It crosses the north-south B1189 then, between the village and Martin it follows part of Car Dyke around the south of Martin Wood, and follows Timberland Delph to the north-east. Timberland Drove follows this waterway to the south. At the River Witham, it meets East Lindsey and Woodhall Spa. This part of the parish is called Timberland Dales, and to the south is Thorpe Tilney Dales, and the boundary meets Tattershall Thorpe. At Engine Drain, the boundary heads westward from the River Witham, where it meets Dogdyke. At the junction of Dales Head Dike, it meets Walcott, and follows Walcott Delph and Walcott Bank westwards over Thorpe Tilney Fen. Towards Walcott it briefly follows Car Dyke northwards.

== Amenities ==
The village hall is the centre of village activities. There is a primary and middle school for local children nearby in the village of Martin. The partly Norman Anglican church of St Andrew's seats around 200 people. In the village is a Wesleyan Methodist chapel, and a public house, The Penny Farthing Inn. The surrounding area has small guest houses and other public houses.
