= Musgrave Heighington =

English organist and composer

Musgrave Heighington (c.1680 – 1764) was an English organist and composer.

== Background ==
Musgrave was the son of Ambrose Heighington of White Hurworth, Durham, and of his wife, who was one of the four daughters of Sir Edward Musgrave, first baronet, of Hayton Castle, Cumberland.

He spent time in Dublin between 1725 and 1728.

He held positions as organist in Hull, Bridlington, Great Yarmouth, Leicester and Dundee, and was involved in local musical societies.

== Appointments ==
- Organist of Holy Trinity Church, Hull 1717 – 1720
- Organist at Bridlington
- Organist of Great Yarmouth Minster 1733 – 1746
- Organist of St. Martin's Church, Leicester 1746 - ????
- Organist at the Episcopal Chapel, Dundee 1756 - 1764

== Compositions ==
- Anniversary ode for the Spalding Society.
- Six Select Odes of Anacreon in Greek and Six of Horace in Latin
- Several songs
