= Car Dyke =

Ditch in the Fens in eastern England

Coordinates: 53.0125°N 0.2678°W

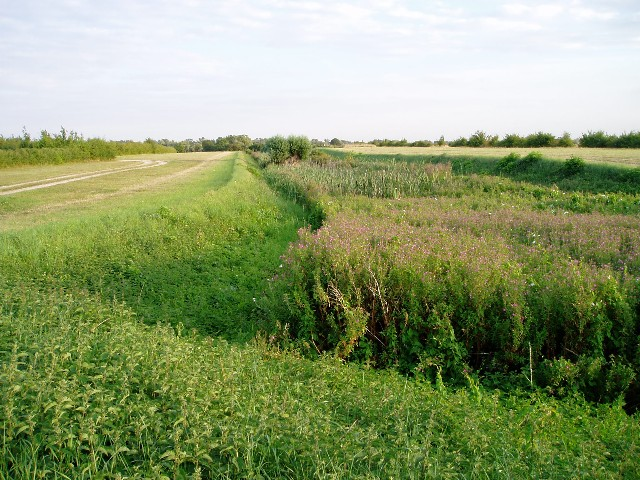
- A broad section of the Car Dyke near Waterbeach in high summer
- Interactive map of Car Dyke

Specifications
- Length: 92 km (57 miles)
- Status: part watered, part ancient monument

History
- Date completed: Roman period

The Car Dyke is a long ditch which runs along the western edge of the Fens in eastern England for a distance of over 57 miles (92 km). It is generally accepted as being a Roman construction and was, for many centuries, considered to mark the western edge of the Fens. Its name derives from carr, a fourteenth-century word for marsh or drained land.

== History ==
The Car Dyke is a ditch that runs through the counties of Lincolnshire and Cambridgeshire. The main section starts close to the River Witham at Washingborough, near Lincoln and runs in a generally southerly direction to Fengate on the River Nene, near Peterborough. A second artificial watercourse, also known as Car Dyke, runs for 5 miles (8 km) from Setchel Fen on the Old West River, part of the River Great Ouse system, southwards to Waterbeach on the River Cam. The northern section is around 57 miles (92 km) long, and is by far the longest artificial waterway constructed by the Romans in Britain, while it is also longer than any known Roman navigational canals on continental Europe.

There are no known contemporary records relating to its construction or use. The ditch is obviously artificial, since it runs from north to south, whereas all the natural drainage of the area runs from west to east, and it roughly follows the 10-foot (3 m) contour. William Stukeley, writing in the eighteenth century, was the first person to describe it as a Roman-era canal used for transporting goods. Excavations on the southern section at Waterbeach in the 1990s by the archaeology unit of Cambridgeshire County Council found what were seen as the remains of a Roman-era boat and a cargo of pottery from Horningsea. This stretch, where significant archaeological deposits are likely to remain, has been protected as a scheduled monument. The northern channel near Baston was found to have a navigable width of 40 feet (12 m) and a depth of 6.5 feet (2 m) when archaeological excavation was carried out in the 1980s. The southern section had a similar depth but was somewhat wider at around 66 feet (20 m).

Stukeley argued that the two parts of the Car Dyke were connected together, and acted as a transport route supplying grain to Lincoln, York and military settlements further north. No evidence of rivers or artificial cuts to form the link between Peterborough and the Great Ouse at Setchel Fen has been found, and this idea has been rejected. The Ordnance Survey map of Roman Britain shows a waterway heading south-eastwards from Peterborough, known as Cnut's Dyke, but it stops before it reaches Ramsey. Although Dannell provides evidence that Cnut's Dyke is of Roman origin, his Cnut's Dyke is also known as King's Dyke, an old course of the River Nene. Bond states that there is no evidence to support a Roman date for Cnut's Dyke, and that it was probably built in the tenth century, to facilitate the construction of Ramsey Abbey.

=== Transport and hydrology ===
An assessment by Historic England states that in the Romano-British economy Car Dyke was significant both as a transport system and as a means of drainage, saving large parts of the Fens from flooding. Its importance is indicated by the large and organised labour force, either a civilian undertaking organised by Iceni tribal leaders or from the military, needed to build it.

=== Movement of goods ===
Excavations have found coal from the Midlands in use at a cluster of Roman-era coal-burning forges sited between Cambridge and The Wash and these provide evidence of trade and transport along the Car Dyke. Return cargoes were grain to supply the garrison at York, prepared for transport and storage by drying in coal kilns, and pottery. At its northern end accounts of Roman Britain describe it as an extension of the Foss Dyke, an accepted transport route. Near Morton, Lincolnshire, a boatload of dressed quarry stone, identified with the mediaeval period, has been discovered in the canal bed.

=== Drainage ===
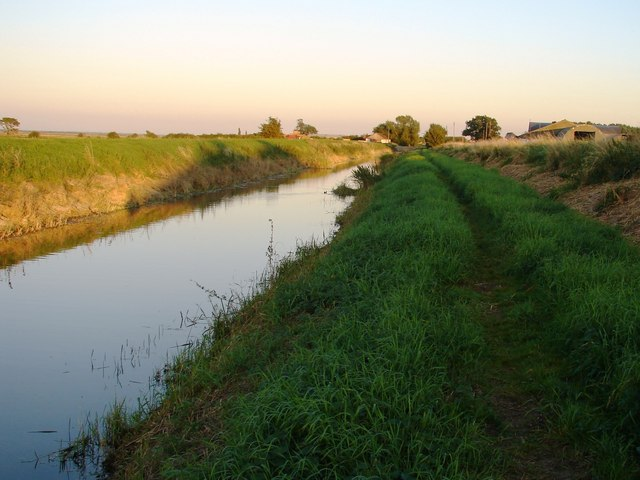
Upcast banks set well apart, as in this well-preserved section near Branston Booths, Lincolnshire, suggest a canal intended for navigation

In some sections the topography suggests that its use as a canal was unlikely or at least difficult: the segment which ran through the Soke of Peterborough rises from the River Nene to a ridge at Eye before falling to the River Welland. This it does in steady gradients, quite unlike the characteristics of a canal designed for transport. Its course makes it clear that this outcome was carefully planned. At some level sections in Lincolnshire it has causeways of never-disturbed ground crossing it and it passes in gradients, up and down the sides of slight ridges. Given the length of the canal, however, modern surveyors suggest that the original engineers may not have been able to keep the canal at a constant level (due to surveying difficulties or lack of budget to excavate deeper). Natural barriers may therefore have been left in place to partition the canal into sections, maintaining the required depth of water, with goods transhipped or boats dragged across the barriers. They may also have been a deliberate precaution against the whole section drying out in summer. Archaeologist Grahame Clark established that gravel causeways at Cottenham originated only after the canal had gone out of use for transport, no earlier than the fourth century, as a precaution against flooding.

The dyke acts as a catchwater drain in parts, intercepting runoff from the higher ground to the west. However, the southern half of its passage through Lincolnshire and its northern end, near Washingborough, have a raised bank on each side; the one on the upland side would not be a feature well adapted to a catchwater drain. Those near Washingborough still survive to a height of over 3 feet (1 m), and would have prevented surface water entering the canal. Evidence of seventeenth-century improvements to form part of local drainage schemes has been identified, overlying material from the Roman period.

Archaeological investigation funded by English Heritage on a section of the dyke near Waterbeach suggests that the effect of both deliberate re-cuts in the late Roman period to improve land drainage, and the natural flows of surface water along some sections of the route, resulted in the change of use from transport to agricultural improvement.

=== Boundary ===
It is possible to trace features that could be interpreted as boundaries all round The Fens which are either of Roman date or natural. In c. 120 AD the Roman emperor Hadrian visited Britain and the sections dating from this period may be associated with his plan to settle the Fens. The exception is in the south-east of the Fens where the landscape was manually strip mined for coprolite, a source of phosphate used to enrich agricultural soils. The coprolite was found in a seam of Cambridge Greensand, and the industry thrived in the latter half of the 19th century, destroying any evidence of boundary features, before the days of detailed mapping and aerial photography. One conclusion, though given the conflicts in the surviving evidence one not reached by everyone, is that overall the dyke was used primarily as a boundary, (as part of it in south Lincolnshire undoubtedly was in the medieval period) but that parts were adapted to serve also as a catchwater drain.

== Route ==
The 57-mile (92 km) northern part of the Car Dyke from Lincoln to Peterborough is reasonably easy to follow with earthworks extant upon the ground or from cropmarks visible from the air. It is marked on the Ordnance Survey map of Roman Britain and was shown on the first edition maps by the Ordnance Survey produced in 1824. Much of it is still marked on the modern 1:25,000 map and the 1:2,500 map. The southern section from Peterborough to Waterbeach is not so easy to follow. The 2001 map of Roman Britain shows the dyke from Peterborough terminating to the north of Ramsey, with an isolated section running on the same alignment northwards from Waterbeach on the River Cam. The short section between Waterbeach and the Cam (also known as The Old Tillage, a name deriving from a dialect word for loading and unloading) is of established Roman-era origin.

At the northern end, the first recognisable remains are to the north of the B1190 road through Washingborough, where the south bank runs between gardens and allotments. Material from the north bank was used to construct new banks for the River Witham in the early 19th century, as part of a project to replace the original locks at Kirkstead and Barlings with new locks at Stamp End and Bardney, authorised by a local act of Parliament, the River Witham Drainage and Navigation Act 1808 (48 Geo. 3. c. cviii). There are then six short sections which are listed as scheduled monuments, with gaps due to the construction of houses and a community centre on the line of the remains. Its course then turns to the south-east, running parallel to the B1190, as it heads through Branston Booths, passing the end of Branston Delph and Carr-Dyke Farm, one of many similarly named farms along its length, to reach Potterhanworth Booths. Much of its route has become part of the modern land-drainage infrastructure, and so the remains are not particularly well preserved.

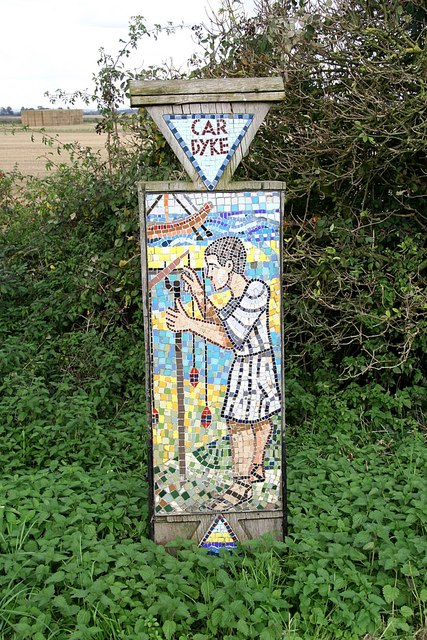
Car Dyke mosaic sign near Martin, Lincolnshire, showing a surveyor using a groma.

It then heads broadly southwards across open countryside and forms the eastern boundary of Potterhanworth Wood. In Nocton Fen it passes to the east of the site of Nocton Park Priory, and then there is another scheduled section, bordered to the west by Nocton Wood, and connected to Nocton Delph, which flows eastwards to the River Witham. In Metheringham Fen it turns to the east, and there are two short scheduled section after Blankney Wood, divided by the buildings of Oak Tree Farm. It then resumes its southward passage, and after Carrdyke Farm, there is another scheduled section. It passes to the east of Martin and the western end of Timberland Delph, before following a large S-shaped course to the east of Timberland. Immediately afterwards there are two more scheduled sections, one to the north of Fen Road, Timberland and the second to the south.

The dyke passes to the east of Walcott and along the northern and eastern edge of Billinghay, where it joins Billinghay Skirth, which drains into the River Witham. The continuation of Billinghay Skirth to the south-west uses the course of Car Dyke, and when it turns to the west near North Kyme, Car Dyke continues southwards, running along the western edge of North Kyme to reach the River Slea at Ferry Bridge. The River Slea makes a right-angled turn at the junction, and then turns to the east again, with Car Dyke continuing southwards, and now part of Midfodder Dike. Its course has then been reused by Hodge Dyke, which again makes a right-angled turn at the junction, until it crosses Heckington Eau, which becomes Head Dike as it continues eastwards. Continuing to the south, it reaches Littleworth Drove, where a house has been built over the remains. It passes under the A17 road, and then Carterplot Road runs parallel to it. It is crossed by the East Midlands Railway line from Sleaford to Swineshead, Little Hale Drove, where there is another Car Dyke farm, Helperingham Eau, North Drove and the Sleaford to Spalding railway line.

At the railway crossing, it turns to the west and then the south west, where there is another scheduled section. It runs to the east of Swaton, with Cardyke Farm to its east, and continues past Horbling and Billingborough until it is crossed by Billingborough Lode, which drains into the South Forty-Foot Drain. There is a large moated site by the junction. Near Pointon, it is crossed by Fen Road, Pointon Lode and Millthorpe Drove, while near Dunsby there is another Car Dyke Farm. Soon its course is joined by Rippingale Running Dyke https://riverlevels.uk/rippingale-running-dyke-gs-gsm-lincolnshire, and between Haconby and Morton there is another Cardyke Farm, before the Car Dyke passes through a small village called Dyke, where there is another scheduled section.

At Bourne the dyke makes right-angled turns to the east and then the south, to join Bourne Eau, which continues westwards to the centre of the town, where the Car Dyke turns to the south and weaves its way between housing. Soon it is back in open countryside, passing to the east of Thurlby where 210 yards (190 m) of earthworks in Park Wood are scheduled, before crossing the River Glen just to the east of Kate's Bridge. Its course is lost as it passes through the housing estates of Baston, as it has in Market Deeping and Deeping St James. As it crosses the River Welland on the southern edge of the town, it passes into Cambridgeshire, and skirts the eastern edges of Northborough and Glinton. As it approaches the northern edge of Peterborough, it turns to the east, where there is another scheduled section at Peakirk, beyond which its course is covered by housing.

From Fen Bridge to Whitepost Road, 2.75 miles (4.4 km) of Car Dyke is scheduled, with two small gaps where the course is cut by Guntons Road and Gunthorpe Road. The overall width of the channel, including the berms, banks and scarps, is between 44 and 77 yards (40 and 70 m). The remains are in good condition, despite the fact that Car Dyke has been reused as part of the modern land drainage system. It then passes through Peterborough where parts of its course are visible, but much has been obliterated by the construction of the A1139 Frank Perkins Parkway. It reaches the River Nene at Fengate.

=== Southern section ===
The southern section runs for 5 miles (8 km) from Setchel Fen, on the south bank of the Old West River to the River Cam at Waterbeach. There are no remaining earthworks on Setchel Fen, although the Ordnance Survey show a proposed course across the southern part of the fen, and a continuation of the route has been reused as a drain to the north of the Engine Drain. To the north of Setchel Drove, Car Dyke runs along the eastern edge of Bullocks Haste Common, where there was a Romano-British settlement. The site is a scheduled monument, but the northern section has been ploughed, and the remains are only visible from aerial photographs. The site continues to the south of Setchel Drove, where there is a series of dykes and field systems, with Car Dyke running through the midst of them. Cottenham Lode, an artificial channel known to have been built before the Norman conquest of 1066, marks the southern edge of Bullocks Haste Common. After that, the dyke has been reused as a drainage channel. It is crossed by the B1049 Twenty Pence Road and by Long Drove drain. There is then a dry section which is a scheduled monument.

The route continues southwards, running to the west of Cambridge Research Park, and again is used as a drainage ditch. It is then cut by the A10 road, which runs along the western bank of the route, with a disused airfield to the east. The route has been lost through Waterbeach, where Denny End has been built over its course, but there is a final section to the south of the village, which is also a scheduled monument and a drainage channel. This section is known as The Old Tillage, and is crossed by the Fen Line railway just before it reaches the River Cam.

== Fens Waterways Link ==
The section between the rivers Nene and Welland may be restored to navigation as a section of the new Fens Waterways Link for leisure craft. An engineering study has been made, but because of concerns for its historic status it is not the preferred route, with the Cat's Water Drain being the other considered option.

== See also ==
- List of Roman canals
