= Branston Booths =

Village in Lincolnshire, England

Coordinates: 53.20°N 00.41°W

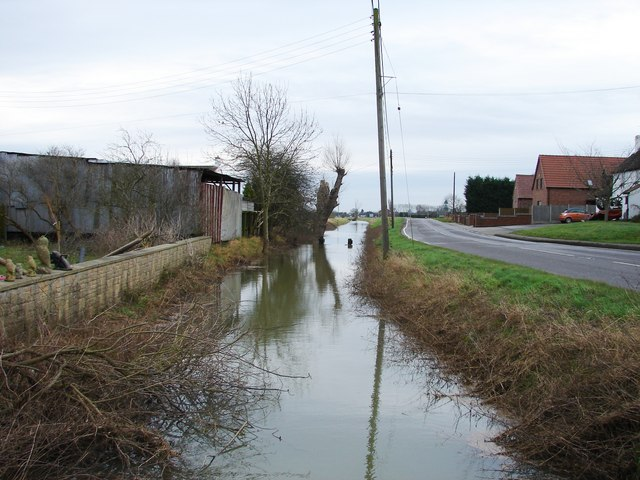
- The Car Dyke at Branston Booths

- Location within Lincolnshire
- OS grid reference: TF0669
  - London: 115 mi (185 km) S
- Civil parish: Branston and Mere
- District: North Kesteven
- Shire county: Lincolnshire
- Region: East Midlands
- Country: England
- Sovereign state: United Kingdom
- Post town: Lincoln
- Postcode district: LN4
- Dialling code: 01522
- Police: Lincolnshire
- Fire: Lincolnshire
- Ambulance: East Midlands

Branston Booths is a small village in the civil parish of Branston and Mere, in the North Kesteven district of Lincolnshire, England. The village is situated approximately 5 miles (8 km) east from the city of Lincoln, and stands at the intersection of the Car Dyke and Branston Delph drain.

A church mission hall with seating for over 500 was built at Branston Booths in 1931. A Methodist chapel with seating for 110 was built to the south-west of the village at Branston Moor in 1911.

== History ==
Neolithic axes and arrowheads have been found in Branston Booths, as well as Bronze Age socketed axes and round barrows.

Branston Booths and Potterhanworth Booths were both settled by the Romans. At Branston Booths, remains of a Roman villa(s) and tile kiln were found, as well as tracks, pottery, coins and building debris.
