= Little Hale =

Hamlet and civil parish in the North Kesteven district of Lincolnshire, England

Coordinates: 52.961008°N 0.296524°W

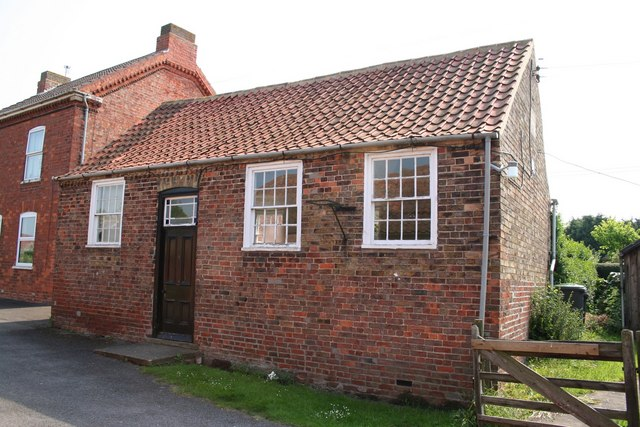
- Primitive Methodist chapel, Little Hale

- Location within Lincolnshire
- Population: 207 (2011)
- OS grid reference: TF145417
  - London: 100 mi (160 km) S
- District: North Kesteven
- Shire county: Lincolnshire
- Region: East Midlands
- Country: England
- Sovereign state: United Kingdom
- Post town: Sleaford
- Postcode district: NG34
- Police: Lincolnshire
- Fire: Lincolnshire
- Ambulance: East Midlands
- UK Parliament: Grantham and Bourne

Little Hale is a hamlet and civil parish in the North Kesteven district of Lincolnshire, England. It is situated 5 miles (8 km) south-east from the town of Sleaford, and directly south from the larger villages of Great Hale and Heckington. Adjacent villages include Burton Pedwardine, Great Hale and Helpringham. Little Hale, a village of approximately 60 houses, lies on the eastern western edge of the Lincolnshire Fens.

== History ==
In 1885, Kelly's Directory described Little Hale as a township with an 1881 population of 362, and land of some parts light loam, and some, clay. Chief crops grown were wheat, barley, oats, beans, seeds and turnips. The village contained a post office, and a National School for 130 children, with an average attendance of 90. The 3rd Marquess of Bristol was Lord of the manor. Little Hale commercial occupations at the time were twelve farmers, publicans at the Nags Head and Bowling Green public houses, two shopkeepers, a grocer & draper, a wheelwright and a shoe maker. The settlement of Broadhurst existed 1.5 miles (2.4 km) south-east from Little Hale.

In 1933, Kelly's described a Little Hale township area of 2,481 acres (10.0 km^{2}) and 7 acres (0.03 km^{2}) of water, and a 1921 population of 264. Lord of the manor was the 4th Marquess of Bristol MVO. No school was noted in the village. Little Hale commercial occupations were nineteen farmers, a wheelwright, two shopkeepers, one of whom ran the post office, and a publican at the Bowling Green public house. There was a bus service between the village and Sleaford. No mention was made of the settlement of Broadhurst.

== Governance ==
Little Hale was originally a township in Great Hale ancient parish in the Kesteven part of Lincolnshire. It was made a separate civil parish in 1866. When a township, it was in Aswardhurn wapentake, and was in Sleaford poor law union and rural sanitary districts. From 1894 to 1931 it was in Sleaford Rural District, and from 1931 to 1974 it was in East Kesteven Rural District. Since 1974, it has been in North Kesteven district.

It was in the Southern Lincolnshire constituency for the United Kingdom parliament from 1832 to 1867, which changed its name to become the South Lincolnshire constituency in between 1867 and 1885, the North Kesteven constituency from 1885 to 1918, and from 1918 to 1997, it was in Grantham constituency. Since 1997, it has been in the Grantham and Stamford constituency.

== Community ==
Little Hale is served by OnLincolnshire for broadband service.

== Notes and references ==
=== Bibliography ===
- Youngs, F. A. (1991). Guide to the local administrative units of England. (Volume 1: Northern England). London: Royal Historical Society. ISBN 0-86193-127-0.
