= Great Hale =

Village and civil parish in the North Kesteven district of Lincolnshire, England

Coordinates: 52.972845°N 0.287795°W

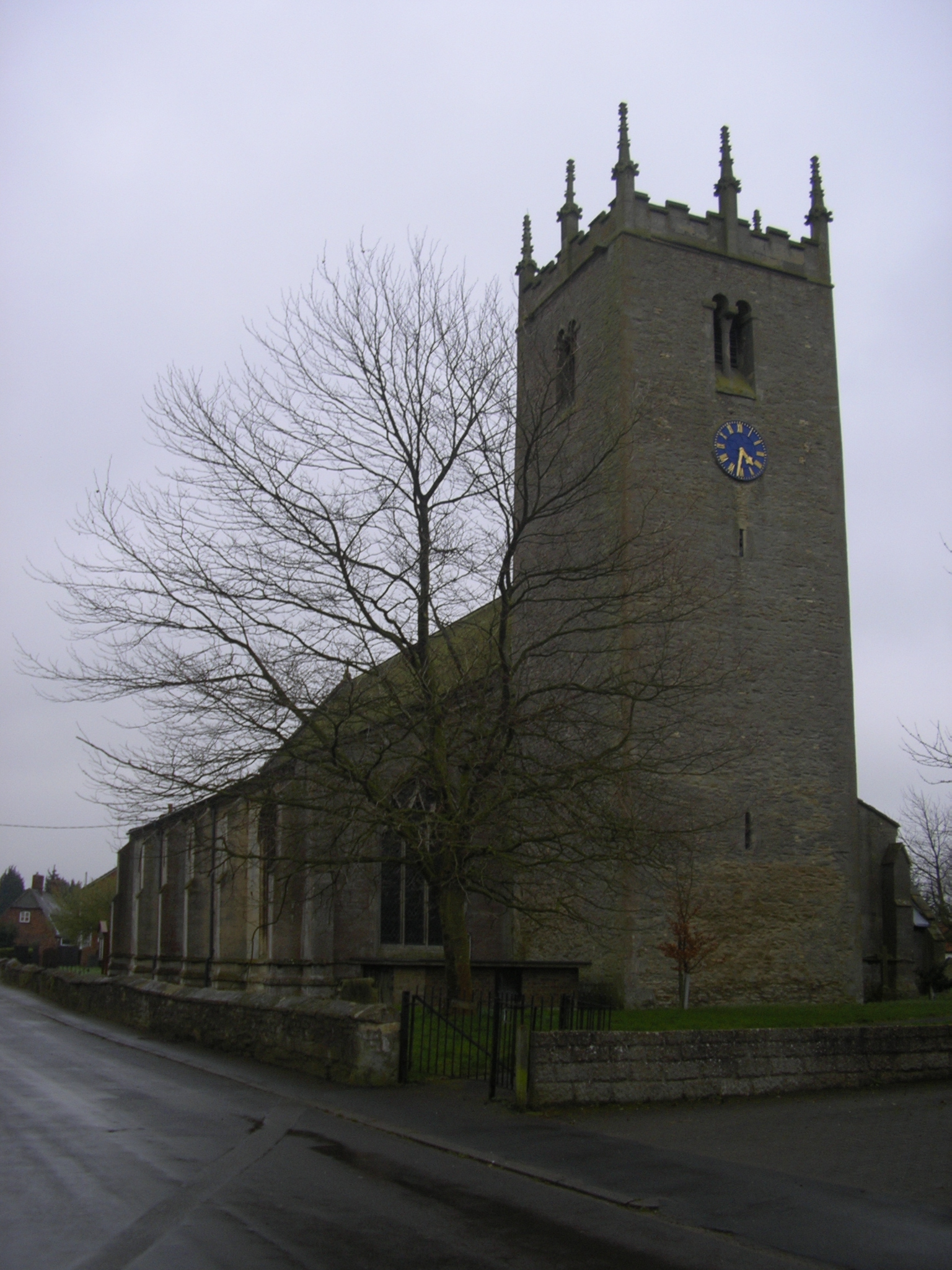
- Church of St John the Baptist, Great Hale

- Location within Lincolnshire
- Population: 778 (2011)
- OS grid reference: TF150430
  - London: 100 mi (160 km) S
- District: North Kesteven
- Shire county: Lincolnshire
- Region: East Midlands
- Country: England
- Sovereign state: United Kingdom
- Post town: SLEAFORD
- Postcode district: NG34
- Police: Lincolnshire
- Fire: Lincolnshire
- Ambulance: East Midlands
- UK Parliament: Grantham and Bourne

Great Hale is a village and civil parish in the North Kesteven district of Lincolnshire, England. The population of the civil parish at the 2011 census was 778. It is situated on the B1394 road, immediately south from Heckington and 1.7 miles (2.7 km) north from Helpringham.

== History ==
Great Hale, an ancient Kesteven parish, was in the Aswardhurn wapentake, the Sleaford poor law union and rural sanitary districts. From 1894 to 1931 it was part of Sleaford Rural District, and from 1931 to 1974, East Kesteven Rural District. Since 1974 it has been in the North Kesteven district. The parish originally incorporated both townships of Little Hale and Great Hale, but Little Hale became a separate civil parish in 1866. In 1935 it gained part of the ancient parish of Bicker in the Holland part of Lincolnshire.

The parliamentary constituency for Great Hale has changed over the years. It was in the Southern Lincolnshire constituency for the United Kingdom parliament from 1832 to 1867, which became the South Lincolnshire constituency from 1867 to 1885, the North Kesteven constituency from 1885 to 1918, and the Grantham constituency from 1918 to 1997. From 1997 to 2010 Great Hale had been in the Grantham and Stamford constituency. However, following the 2010 Boundary Review, it has been in the Sleaford and North Hykeham constituency.

== Religion ==
The church of St John the Baptist is at the centre of the village. The church tower is late Saxon and pre-dates the Norman Conquest by approximately 100 years. The belfry and the circular staircase to the top of the tower are typical examples of pre-Conquest stone construction. The exterior of the east wall has a bulge to accommodate the staircase built within it, and is approximately 16 inches (41 cm) wide. Most of the steps are original and are severely worn down through centuries of use. The church contains memorials to past residents, and historical items such as a hautbois, an early form of oboe.

The ecclesiastical parish is Great and Little Hale, part of the Helpringham Group of the Deanery of Lafford. The 2013 incumbent is Rev Chris Harrington.

== Education ==
There was a National School in the village by 1872. By 1903, it was a Church of England school known as Hale Magna CE School and later Great Hale CE School. In 1956, it was reorganised as a junior and infants school; senior pupils were transferred to Sleaford County Secondary Modern. Great Hale CE School closed in 1987 and children attend Heckington or Helpringham Primary Schools.
