= Helpringham railway station =

Former railway station in Lincolnshire, England

Helpringham
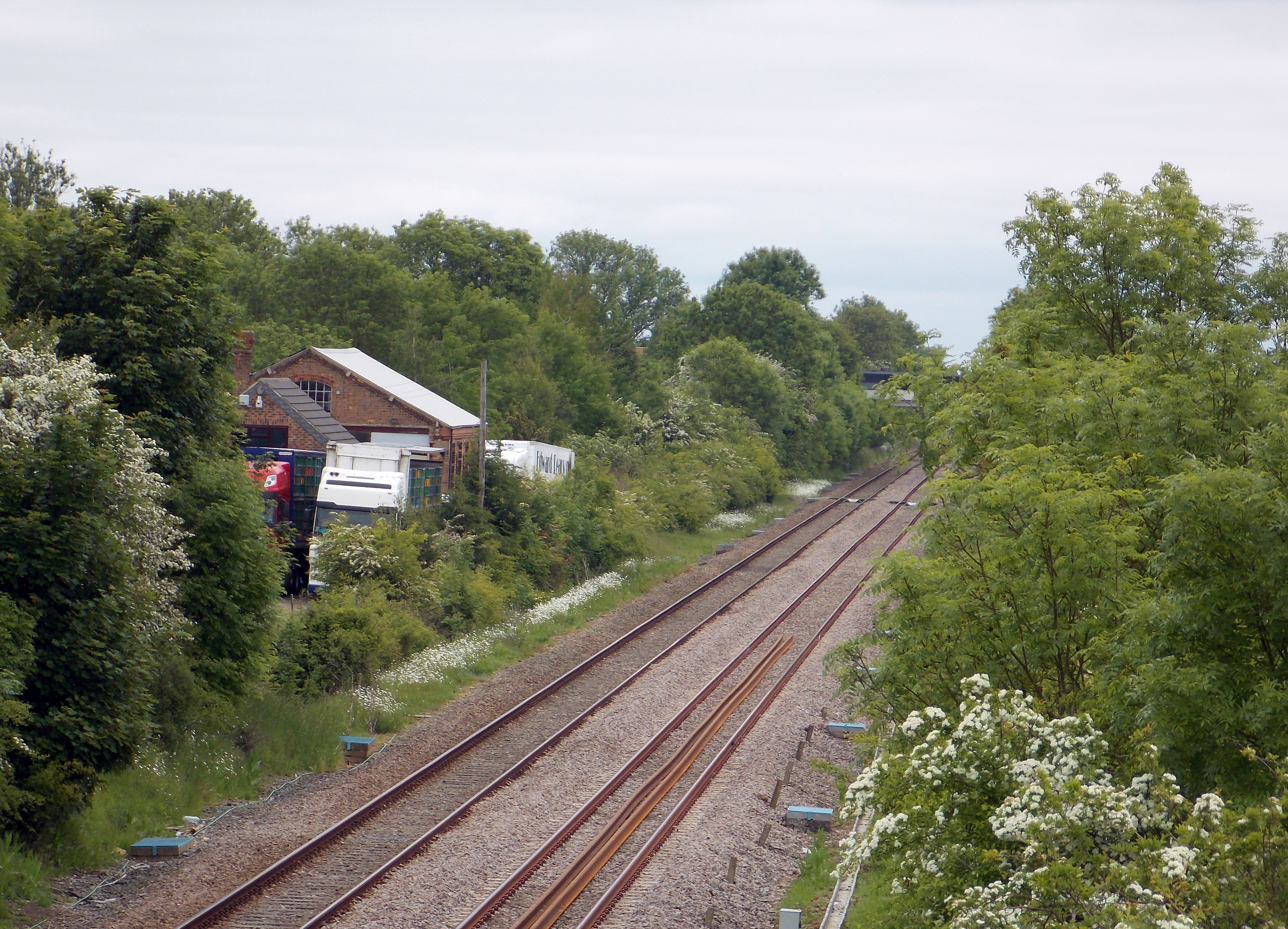
- Site of Helpringham railway station. The largest building is the former station's goods shed

General information
- Location: Helpringham, North Kesteven; England
- Coordinates: 52.9527°N 0.3179°W
- Grid reference: TF131408
- Platforms: 2

Other information
- Status: Disused

History
- Original company: Great Northern and Great Eastern Joint Railway
- Pre-grouping: Great Northern and Great Eastern Joint Railway
- Post-grouping: London and North Eastern Railway

Key dates
- 6 March 1882: Station opened
- 4 July 1955: Station closed for passengers
- 7 December 1964: closed for freight
Location

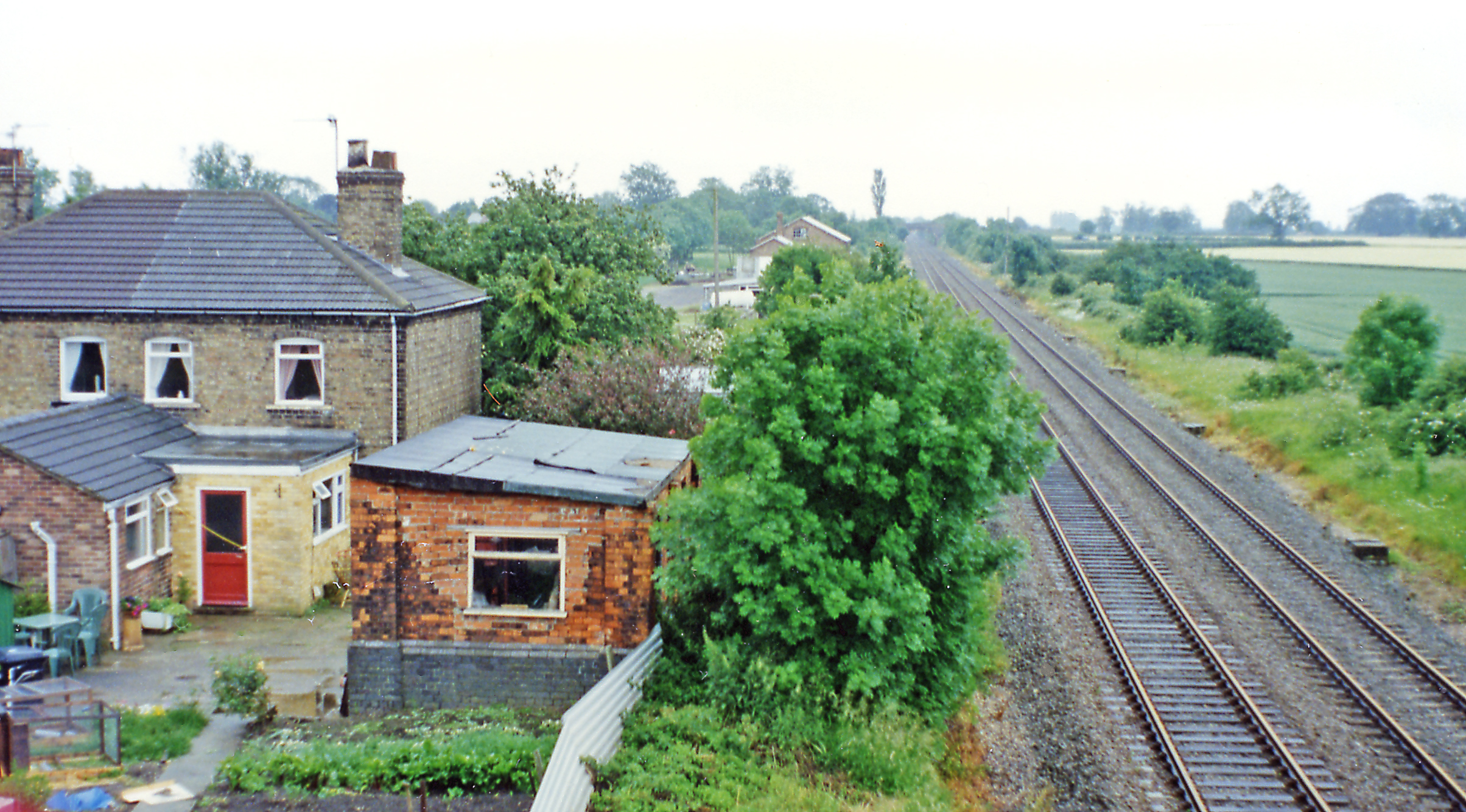
The station buildings in 1997

Helpringham railway station was a station in Helpringham, Lincolnshire.

The station was opened by the Great Northern and Great Eastern Joint Railway on 6 March 1882.

The station closed for passengers on 4 July 1955.

Preceding station	Historical railways	Following station
Donington Road; Line open, station closed	GN and GE Joint Railway	Sleaford; Line and station open
