= Castle Donington =

Village in Leicestershire, England

Coordinates: 52.8444°N 1.3377°W

- Village
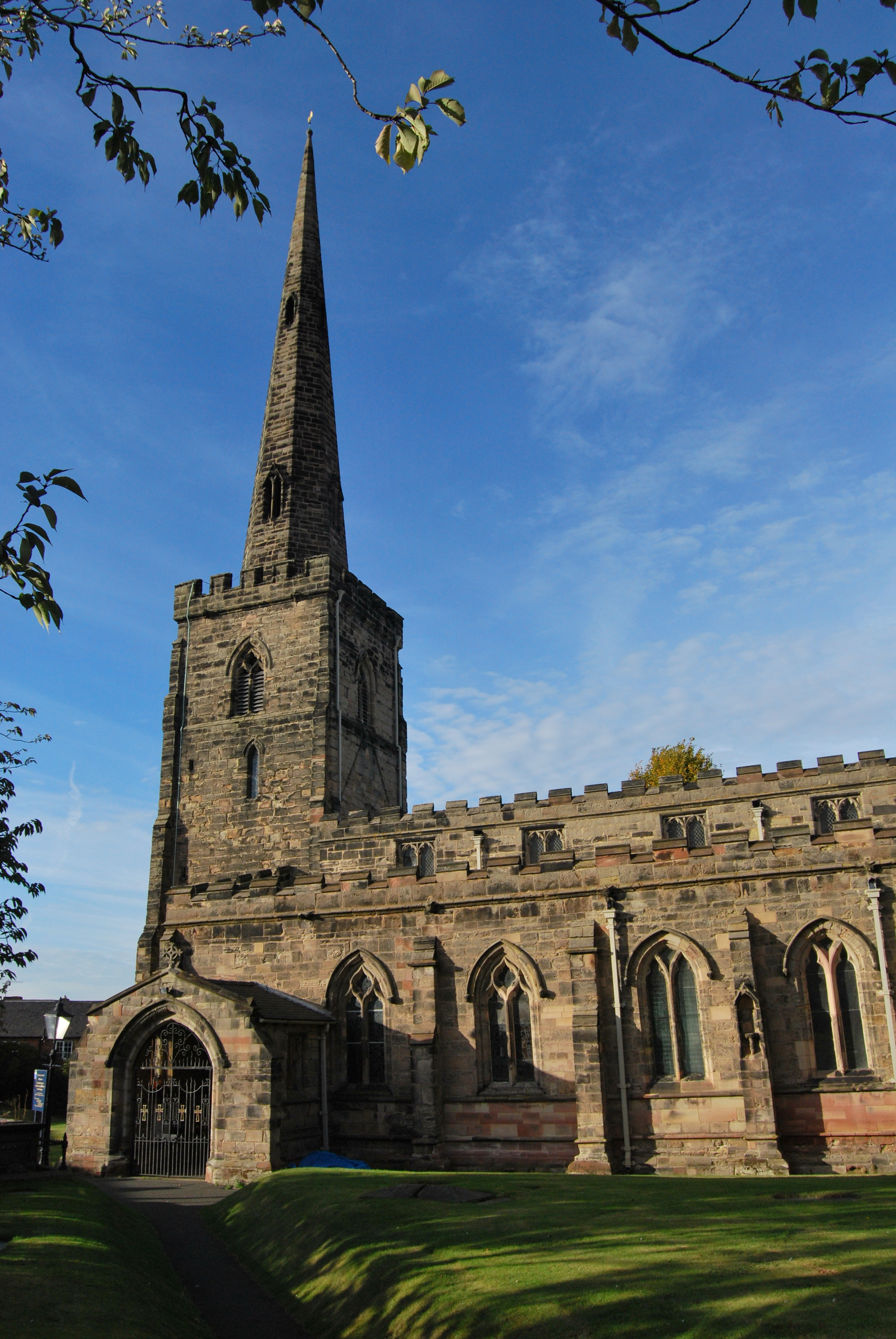
- Parish church of St Edward, King and Martyr

- Location within Leicestershire
- Population: 7,346 (2021 census)
- OS grid reference: SK446272
- District: North West Leicestershire
- Shire county: Leicestershire
- Region: East Midlands
- Country: England
- Sovereign state: United Kingdom
- Post town: DERBY
- Postcode district: DE74
- Dialling code: 01332
- Police: Leicestershire
- Fire: Leicestershire
- Ambulance: East Midlands
- UK Parliament: North West Leicestershire

Castle Donington is a market village and civil parish in Leicestershire, England, on the edge of the National Forest and close to East Midlands Airport.

== Etymology ==
The name 'Donington' means 'farm/settlement connected with Dunna'. Another suggestion is that it could mean 'farm/settlement at the hill place'.

== History ==
King's Mill, the nearby crossing on the River Trent, is mentioned in a charter issued by Æthelred the Unready in 1009 regarding the boundaries of Weston-on-Trent. Dunintune or Dunitone is mentioned twice in the Domesday Book of 1086 as having land belonging to Countess Ælfgifu and land assigned to Earl Hugh. It is called Castoldonyngtoin in a duchy of Lancaster warrant of 1484.

In 1278, King Edward I granted a charter for a weekly market and an annual Wakes Fair. The Fair continues in Borough Street for three days each October.

Lace-making was an important industry up until the 1850s, when a sharp decline in the population is recorded. The population did not recover to the same level until a century later when in 1950 over 3,000 people are recorded as living in the village.

Bondgate, Borough Street, and Clapgun Street formed the nucleus of the historic village, with the Castle formerly standing at the eastern end of Borough Street on Castle Hill. It was abandoned and its stone used to build Donington Hall within Donington Park.

In the early 1960s local councils from Derby, Nottingham, and Leicester were seeking a suitable site to build an airport for the region. The former RAF Castle Donington, to the south of the village, was chosen and land purchased in the parishes of Kegworth, Hemington and Lockington to form an enclosed site now forming East Midlands Airport. The airport opened in 1965 and is now the tenth largest airport in the UK, the largest in terms of freight and cargo not within a passenger plane. The airport site is now an important economic centre and a major employer in the area.

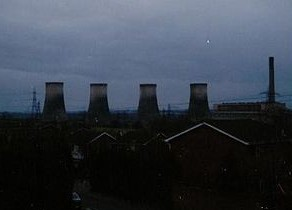
Power station, demolished in 1996

Castle Donington Power Station was built in 1958 as one of the largest coal-fired power stations in Europe. It was closed in September 1994 and demolished in 1996.

== Education ==
Castle Donington has three primary schools, St Edwards, Foxbridge, and Orchard, the latter serving the majority of the children of the village. Castle Donington College, which welcomed KS4 for the first time in 2017, takes students from ages 11–16 and is the village's only secondary school.

== Media ==
Local news and television programmes are provided by BBC East Midlands and ITV Central. Television signals are received from the Waltham TV transmitter. The town is served by both BBC Radio Leicester on 104.9 FM and BBC Radio Derby on 104.5 FM. Other radio stations including Capital East Midlands on 102.8 FM, Smooth East Midlands on 101.4 FM, Greatest Hits Radio Midlands on 106.0 FM, and Hermitage FM, a community based station which broadcast on 99.2 FM. The town is served by the local newspapers, Leicester Mercury and Derby Telegraph (formerly Castle Donington Messenger). Castle Donington Life is an independently owned local community magazine serving Castle Donington and surrounding areas.

== Transport and housing ==
Castle Donington stands on the former Nottingham to Birmingham trunk road. The town is a mix of the old and new, with modern shops mixed with dignified Georgian and Regency houses. Several timber-framed houses dating from the 17th century and earlier survive along the main road.

The town has no rail station, but East Midlands Parkway opened early in 2008 at Ratcliffe-on-Soar providing links on the Midland Main Line.

In 1868 the Midland Railway opened the Castle Donington Line, which included Castle Donington and Shardlow railway station, on the northern edge of the town. The station was closed to regular passenger traffic in 1930, and closed completely and demolished in 1968. The access driveway still exists but for pedestrians only, and is the start of a footpath to Hemington, running past the site of the old goods yard, now a scrap yard. The railway remains open for substantial flows of freight traffic as an alternative to the route via Derby.

== Economy ==
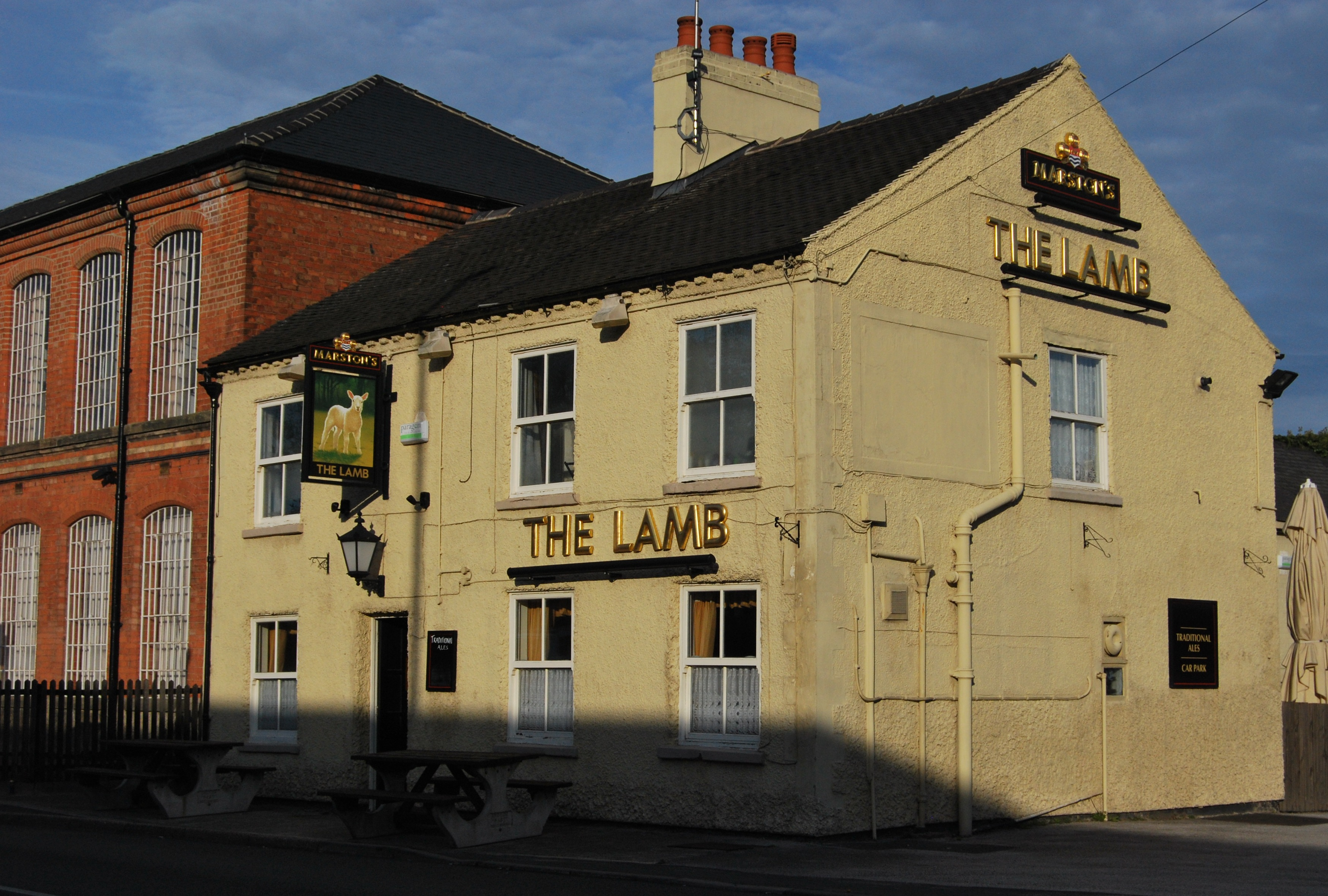
The Lamb Inn

East Midlands Airport is served by several airlines including Ryanair, Jet2.Com, Thomson Airways and Thomas Cook Airlines. The express parcels company DHL has a base at the airport. The now-defunct airline flybmi formerly had its head office at Pegasus Business Park on the airport grounds.

Donington Park motor racing circuit is located to the south west of the village.

The site of the former power station has been redeveloped in to a major retail distribution hub called the East Midlands Distribution Centre and a warehousing area. The principal tenants are Marks and Spencer, Mediq and Super Smart. With the warehouses having a dedicated railhead.

Since 2013 Norton Motorcycles has its head office in Donington Hall. BMI (British Midland), an airline, was headquartered in Donington Hall. The airline moved its headquarters to Donington Hall in 1982. The subsidiary bmibaby also had its head office in Donington Hall.

== Events ==
The annual May Bank Holiday Medieval Market takes place in Borough Street and includes local stalls selling various kinds of produce and goods accompanied by dancing and music.

Donington Park was the original venue for the Monsters of Rock festivals through the 1980s and 1990s, and is now the home of the annual Download Festival, the 2nd largest festival in the United Kingdom. It also hosted a Formula One Grand Prix – The European Grand Prix – in April 1993, which was won by Ayrton Senna. It was also set to be the home of the British Grand Prix from 2010 for at least 10 years, but the agreement was cancelled due to financial problems. The circuit formerly hosted the Donington Grand Prix Collection, at the time the world's largest collection of Formula One and Grand Prix vehicles. Brian Henton, an F1 driver, was born in Castle Donington.

== Sport clubs ==
Castle Donington Town Football Club, who won the Leicestershire County Cup in the 2005–06 season.

Castle Donington Cobras Football Club were winners of the Derbyshire FA Sunday Junior Cup in the 2014–15 season, and 2015–16 season.

Castle Donington Football Club (Charter Standard) Runners up in the North Leicestershire League, Division 1 2014–15 season. Currently playing in The Mel Williams Premier Division.

Castle Donington Town Cricket Club an English amateur cricket club, situated on the Moira Dale Recreation Ground, east of the town. The history of the club dates back to the late 1800s. They have a 1st XI senior side that compete on Saturdays in the Derbyshire County Cricket League, and a Sunday XI team 'The Dons' that play friendly matches in and around the region.

Castle Donington Rugby Union Football Club

Professional Kickboxing Association – Castle Donington a Kickboxing club through KickboxUK. There are several classes broken down into various age groups that take place at Castle Donington Village Hall every week on Wednesday, there are 4 different classes which run, Reception 4-5 years, Cadets 6-9 years, Juniors 10-13 years, and finally an Adults Class for ages 14+.

== Donington Park ==
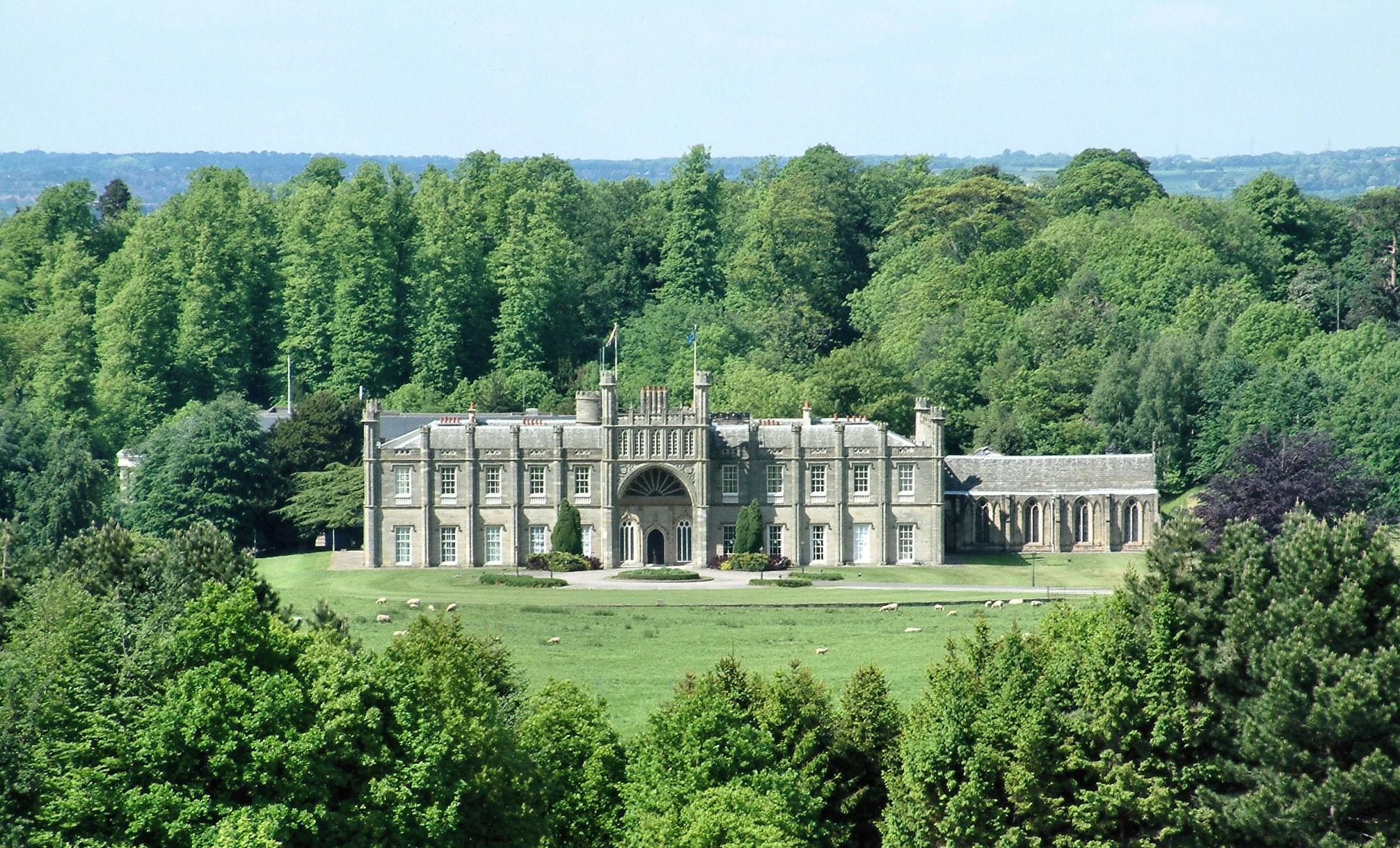
Donington Hall, former headquarters of BMI

Donington Park is a site near Castle Donington in North West Leicestershire, England. Originally part of the Donington Hall estate, the circuit business is now owned by Jonathan Palmer's MotorSport Vision organisation, and the surrounding Donington Park Estate, owned by the Wheatcroft family, is currently under lease by MotorSport Vision until 2038. Used as a motor racing track, it is also the venue for the Download Festival. Donington Park had a contract to stage the Formula One British Grand Prix for a period of 10 years from 2010 but this was later cancelled due to Donington Park's failure to secure the finances required to upgrade the track.

== See also ==
- Castle Donington Methodist Church
