= Helpringham =

Village in Lincolnshire, England

Coordinates: 52.95453°N 0.30504°W

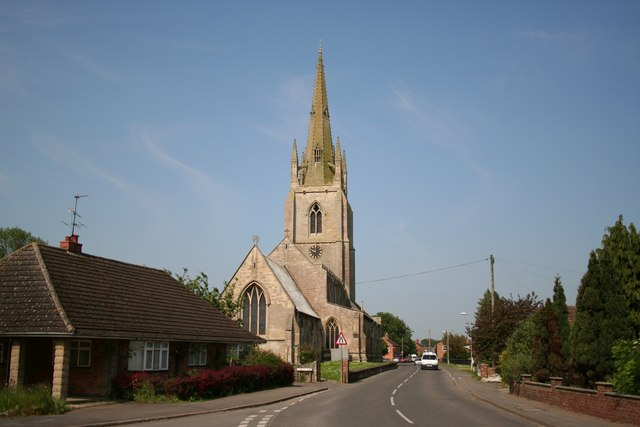
- St Andrew's Church, Helpringham

- Location within Lincolnshire
- OS grid reference: TF139410
  - London: 100 mi (160 km) S
- District: North Kesteven
- Shire county: Lincolnshire
- Region: East Midlands
- Country: England
- Sovereign state: United Kingdom
- Post town: SLEAFORD
- Postcode district: NG34
- Dialling code: 01529
- Police: Lincolnshire
- Fire: Lincolnshire
- Ambulance: East Midlands
- UK Parliament: Sleaford and North Hykeham

Helpringham is a village and civil parish in the North Kesteven district of Lincolnshire, England. It lies on the edge of the Fens, and 5 miles (8 km) southeast of Sleaford. It is noted for its Grade I listed St Andrew's Church.

== History ==
In 1885, Kelly's Directory noted the parish area as 3,227 acres (13 km^{2}) with principal agricultural production of wheat, barley, oats, beans, turnips, and seeds. The population in 1881 was 941. Chief landowners at the time included Lord Willoughby de Broke. There were three chapels: Baptist, Congregational and Primitive Methodist, the last rebuilt in 1883. Parish occupations at the time included 30 farmers, one of whom was a maltster, a market gardener, two coke & coal merchants, three machine owners, a wheelwright, two blacksmiths, a harness maker, a carrier, 2 carpenters, a bricklayer, 2 millers, 2 bakers, a miller & baker, 3 draper & grocers, a butcher, 2 beer retailers, one of whom was also a butcher, a shopkeeper, three shoemakers, one of whom was a registrar for births and deaths, publicans at the Sun, the Willoughby Arms and the Nag's Head public houses, and two tailors, one of whom was also the clerk to the burial and school boards. Helpringham School Board was formed in 1876, to serve a Board School built in 1877. The school held 150 children and had an average attendance of 98.

There was a railway station just west of the village on the Peterborough to Lincoln Line. This station closed in 1970. The nearest station now is at Heckington.

== Geography ==
Helpringham lies on the north to south B1394 road halfway between the A17 to the north, and the A52 to the south. Heckington is 2 miles (3 km) to the north and Swaton 2 miles to the south.

The parish includes the hamlet of Thorpe Latimer to the south. To the west it extends to the boundary with Scredington, up to Field Farm. The boundary to the north follows North Beck, which skirts the north of the village, crossing the B1394 at the narrow Red Bridge. To the east, the boundary follows Helpringham Eau, which crosses the north–south Car Dyke. To the north at this point is Little Hale. Further east along Helpringham Fen, the parish extends to the South Forty-Foot Drain, and the district of South Holland and the parish of Donington.

At this point on the non-navigable South Forty-Foot Drain, at Eau End Farm, is where South Holland and the Borough of Boston meet. Along the South Forty-Foot Drain, the parish extends just south of the railway line and bridge, passing two pumping stations, and the southern boundary meets Swaton. East to west along Helpringham Fen is the Engine Drain.

The Blotoft level crossing is on the Old Forty Foot Bank at South Drove Farm.

== Landmarks ==
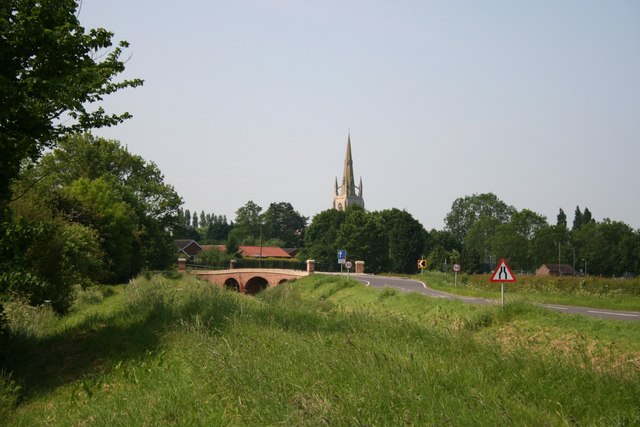
The Red Bridge

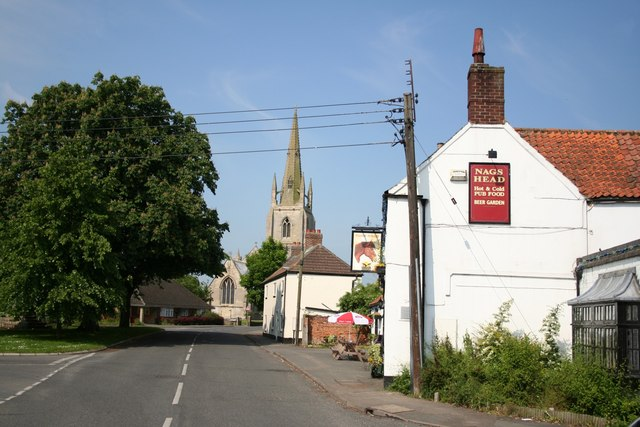
The Nag's Head public house

Helpringham Grade I listed Anglican church is dedicated to St Andrew. Pevsner regarded it as "fine" and Cox as "handsome... [with an] exceptionally fine tower". Originating from the 13th century with later additions and adaptions, it was restored in 1891 by Hodgson Fowler following a roof collapse in 1890. The church is completely ashlar-faced. The tower is of Decorated style with a Perpendicular crocketed spire attached by flying buttresses, and pinnacles set in battlements. The north side of the chancel houses a mural brass to Antonie Newlove, patron of the vicarage, died 1597. The circular font is from 1200 and the rood screen 17th century, and parts of an architectural Norman frieze are on the south wall and north-east corner.

The church appears on a Royal Mail stamp issued on 21 June 1972 as part of a set on British Architecture (Village churches).

Further parish listed buildings include the steps to the base of a former village cross, now surmounted by a war memorial, situated on the village green, an 1864 tower mill, mid-18th-century Thorpe Latimer House, and the 1825 Red Bridge over the Helpringham Eau waterway. An early 19th-century circular village pound behind the Methodist Chapel is Grade II listed.

== Amenities ==
The village has a primary school, post office and the Brass Windmill ..Telephone 01529 421921 public house.
