= North Kesteven Rural District =

Former district of England

Coordinates: 53.15°N 0.55°W

North Kesteven was a rural district in Kesteven, Lincolnshire from 1931 to 1974.

It was created in 1931 under a County Review Order, and was formed from the Branston Rural District, part of the Claypole Rural District and part of the Sleaford Rural District.

It survived until 1974 when it was abolished under the Local Government Act 1972, and merged with East Kesteven Rural District to form a larger district of North Kesteven.
