= Albert Edward Lambert =

British architect (1869–1929)

Nottingham Victoria railway station

Albert Edward Lambert, FRIBA (27 May 1869 – 5 November 1929) was a British architect based in Nottingham, England.

== Biography ==
He was born in Manton in Rutland on 27 May 1869. He was the son of John Lambert and Louisa. By 1871 the family had moved to Draycott in Derbyshire and in 1881 the family were living at the Grocers Shop & Cottage, Wetheral, Cumberland, England.

In the 1891 census, he was living in Derby, with his mother Louisa, and brother George. Lambert's profession is given as architect's assistant.

He married Annie Elizabeth Robinson, daughter of butcher and farmer Michael H. Robinson and Ann, at the end of 1897. His daughter Jessie Kathleen was born on 18 April 1901.

He died at home on 5 November 1929 of encephalitis lethargica, diagnosed 5 years earlier.

== Career ==
By 1901 and until at least 1926 he had offices first at 22 and later at 28 Park Row, Nottingham.

He was a Member of the Society of Architects in 1911, Fellow in 1924 and Fellow of the Royal Institute of British Architects in 1925.

== Buildings ==
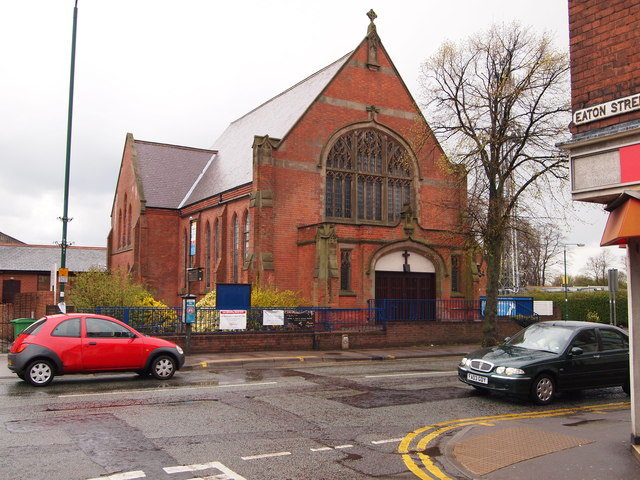
Mapperley Methodist Church, Woodborough Road 1903

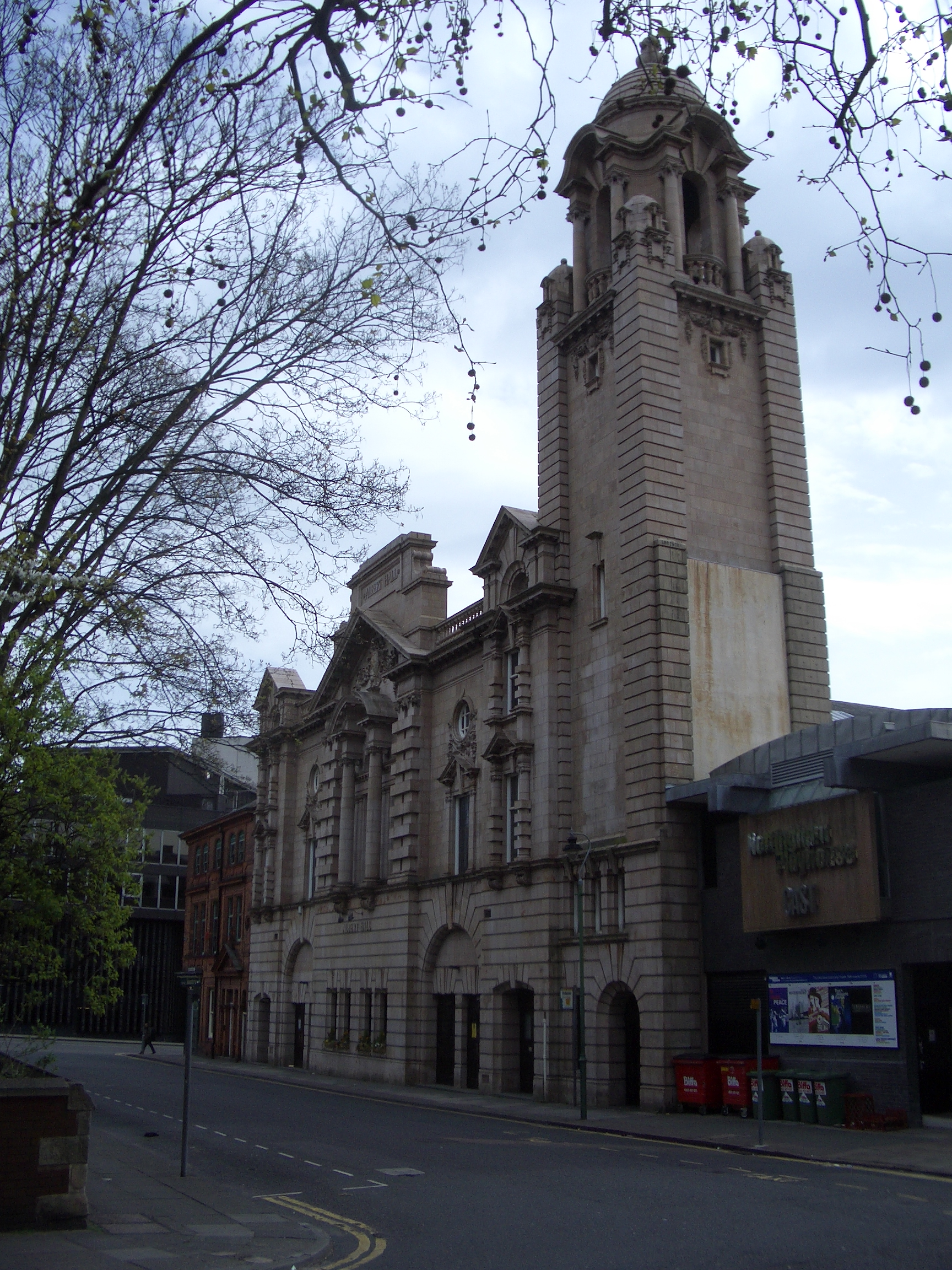
Albert Hall, Nottingham

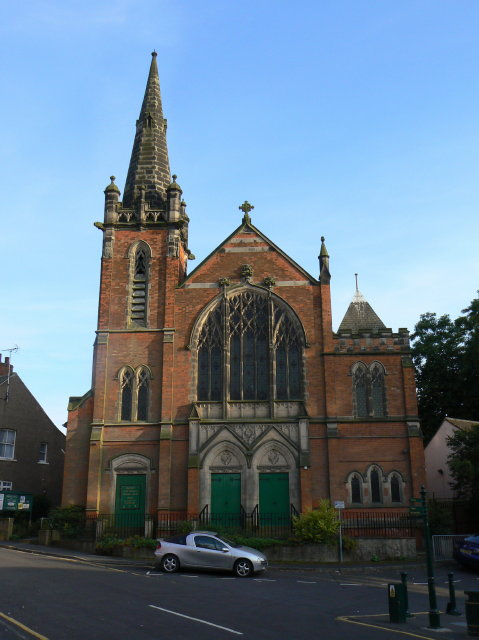
Castle Donington Methodist Church

- Victoria Station, Nottingham. 1900. Demolished 1966.
- Wesleyan Church, St. Anns Well Road, Nottingham. 1902–03. Largely destroyed by fire on the evening of 8 May 1941 following a bombing raid on Nottingham. Demolished circa 1955. (Rebuilt as King's Hall Methodist Church)
- Mapperley Methodist Church, Woodborough Road, Nottingham NG3 5GG 1903–1904.
- Nottingham Midland Station Carrington Street, Nottingham 1904.
- Heckington Methodist Church 1904-1905
- Heckington School
- Offices, 14-16 George Street, Nottingham. 1904.
- Castle Donington Methodist Church, 1906.
- Eaton Methodist Church, Leicestershire, 1906.
- Albert Hall, Nottingham 1907.
- Worksop Flour Mill, 1907
- Metheringham Methodist Church 1907
- Swineshead Methodist Church 1907. Now demolished.
- Burton Joyce Methodist Church, 1908.
- Catterns House, Princess Street, Long Eaton, Derbyshire. (a private house built in the Arts and Crafts style 1908.)
- 196 Tamworth Road, Long Eaton, Derbyshire. Private house 1908 (Originally a doctor's surgery.)
- Dallow Road Wesleyan Methodist Church, Luton. 1908.
- Thornton in the Dale Methodist Church, Yorkshire. 1909.
- Crumpsall Methodist Church, Oak Road, Collyhurst, Manchester. 1909.
- Sleaford, Northgate Methodist Church, 1909 (alterations - building demolished in 1972)
- Welbeck Dining Rooms, West Bridgford, Nottingham. 1909.
- St John's Methodist Church, Swinton, Near Mexborough. Opened Jun 10th 1910
- Albert Hall Institute Nottingham 1910. Demolished 1987.
- Aspinal Centenary (Wesleyan Methodist) Chapel, Reddish Lane, Gorton, Manchester. 1910. Demolished 1972.
- Lincoln (1910) Pennell Street. Two villas built for the Trustees of the Wesleyan Methodist Church. Slate roofs, red brick with bay windows.
- Winchmore Hill Methodist Church, Green Lanes, Enfield, London. 1912
- Mickleover Wesleyan Methodist Church, Station Road, Mickleover, Derbyshire 1914 (replaced in 2000)
- Sedbergh Methodist Church, 1914.
- Lenton Methodist Church 1914.
- Soapworks Nottingham
- Park Lane Wesleyan Methodist Church, Wembley, 1924. Demolished 1961.
