= Grantham Rural District =

Rural district in Lincolnshire, Parts of Kesteven from 1894 to 1931

Coordinates: 52.85°N 0.6°W

Grantham was a rural district in Lincolnshire, Parts of Kesteven from 1894 to 1931.

It was created by the Local Government Act 1894 based on the Grantham rural sanitary district, the Leicestershire part of which went to form the Belvoir Rural District. In 1931, under a County Review Order, it was abolished, with nearly all of its area going to the West Kesteven Rural District, except the parish of Haceby, which became part of the East Kesteven Rural District.
