= Heckington Methodist Church =

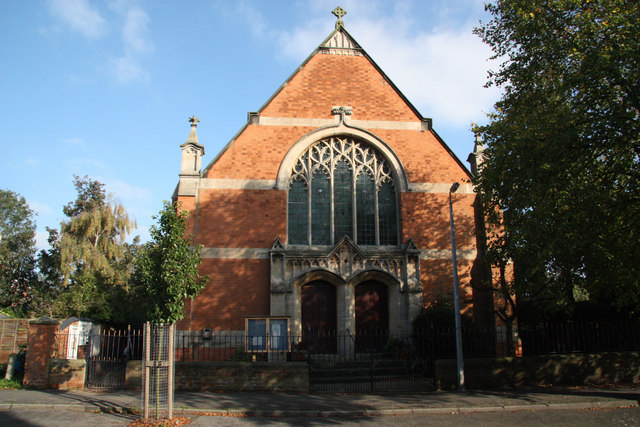
- Heckington Methodist Church
- Heckington Methodist Church
- 52.980987°N 0.299162°W
- OS grid reference: TF 14178 44014
- Country: England
- Denomination: Wesleyan Methodist

Architecture
- Architect: Albert Edward Lambert
- Groundbreaking: 1904
- Completed: 1905

Heckington Methodist Church is in Heckington, Lincolnshire, England.

== History ==
The first Wesleyan Methodist chapel in the village was built in 1809, but this was replaced by a new chapel in Saint Andrew's Street in 1835.

The building of the current church started in 1904 to designs by Nottingham-based architect Albert Edward Lambert. It cost around £2,250 (equivalent to £236,536 in 2025). and was constructed by T. Barlow and Co. of Nottingham.

== Current ==
The church is part of the Sleaford circuit and holds a service at 10:30 every Sunday. There are many social activities which use the church.
