= Castle Donington Methodist Church =

Methodist church in castle Donnington, Leicestershire, England

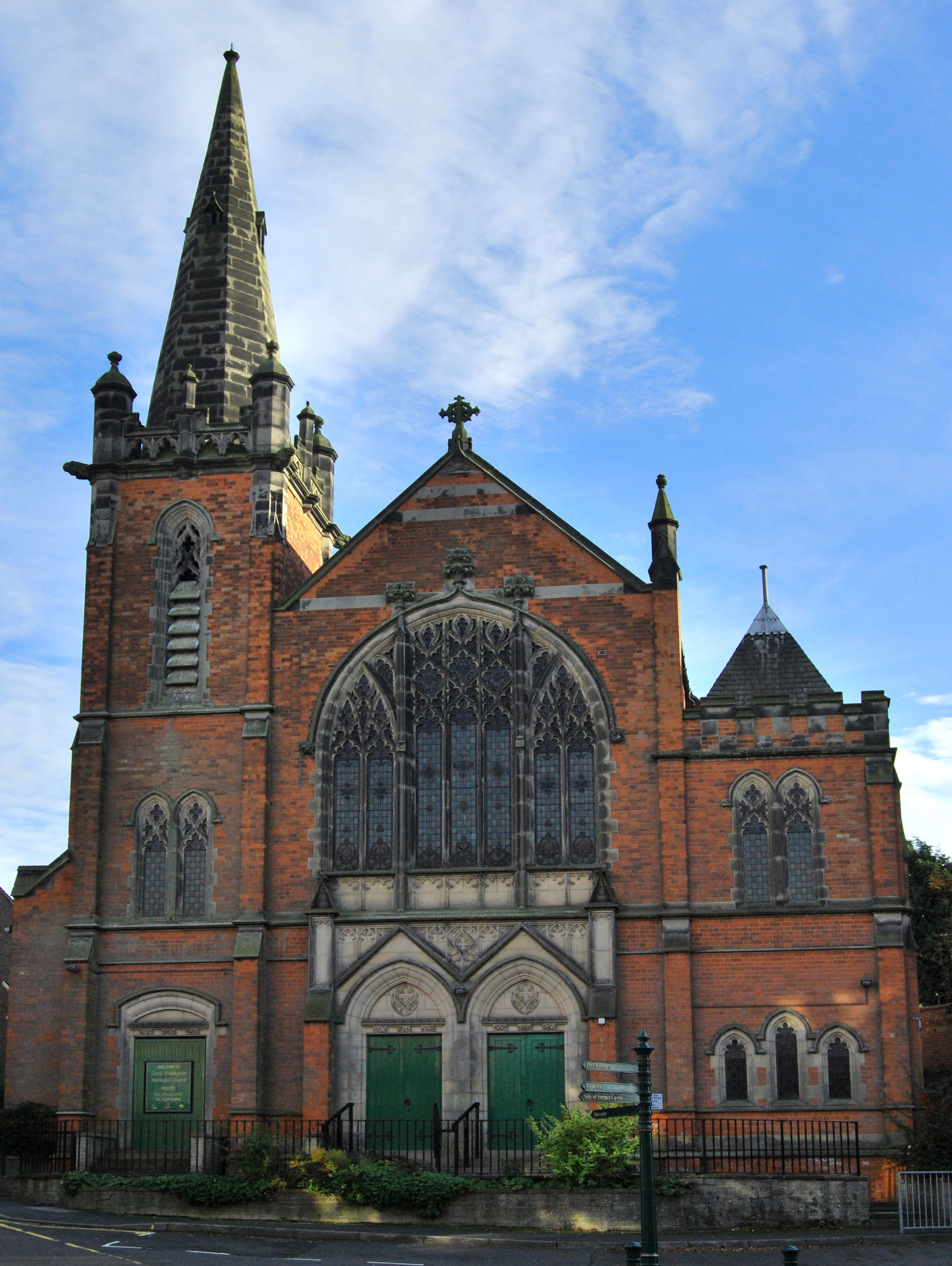
- Castle Donington Methodist Church
- Castle Donington Methodist Church
- 52°50′28.41″N 1°20′20.86″W
- OS grid reference: SK 44611 27282
- Location: Castle Donington
- Country: England
- Denomination: Methodist
- Website: cd-mc.co.uk

Architecture
- Heritage designation: Grade II listed
- Architect: Albert Edward Lambert
- Groundbreaking: 1905
- Completed: 1906
- Construction cost: £6,500

Castle Donington Methodist Church is a Grade II listed Methodist church in Castle Donington, Leicestershire, England.

== History ==
The Methodist Church was designed by the architect Albert Edward Lambert and opened on 16 May 1906, although a Methodist church had existed on the site since the early 18th century. It cost around £6,500 (equivalent to £683,327 in 2025).

The church closed for worship in 2022. The building was put up for sale by auction and fetched £166,000 in October 2024.

== Organ ==
The church contains a two manual pipe organ. A specification of the organ can be found on the National Pipe Organ Register.
