= Branston Rural District =

Former rural district in Lincolnshire, England

Coordinates: 53.19°N 0.47°W

Branston was a rural district in Kesteven in Lincolnshire, England from 1894 to 1931. It was formed under the Local Government Act 1894 from the part of Lincoln rural sanitary district which was in Kesteven (the rest going to form Welton Rural District in Lindsey). It was abolished in 1931 under a County Review Order, and was merged into a North Kesteven Rural District.
