= Donington Road railway station =

Former railway station in Lincolnshire, England

Coordinates: 52.9014°N 0.2169°W

Donington Road
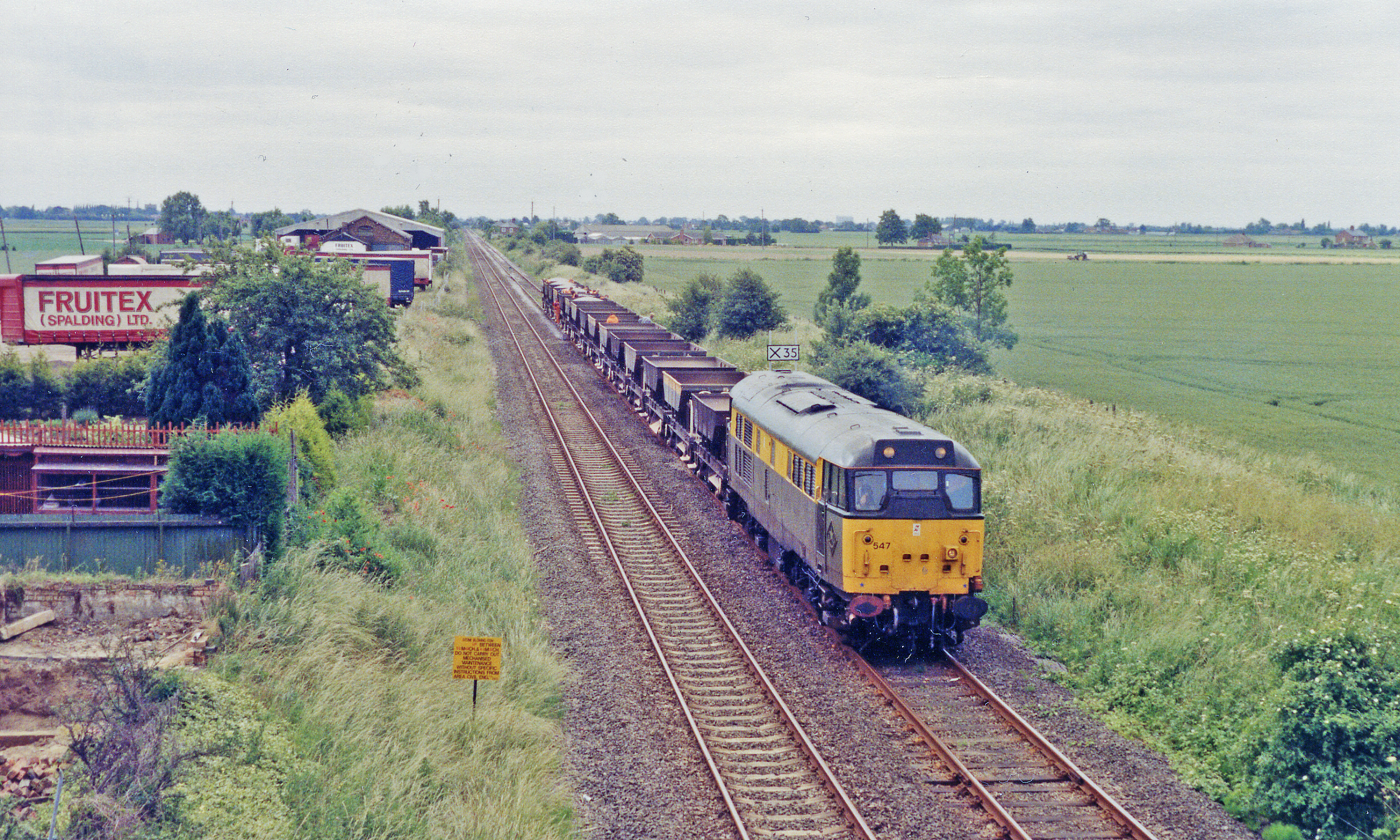
- The site of the station in 1992

General information
- Location: Donington, Lincolnshire; England
- Platforms: 2

Other information
- Status: Disused

History
- Original company: Great Northern and Great Eastern Joint Railway
- Pre-grouping: Great Northern and Great Eastern Joint Railway
- Post-grouping: London and North Eastern Railway

Key dates
- 6 March 1882: Station opened
- 11 September 1961: Station closed to passengers
- 7 December 1964: closed for freight
Location

Donington Road railway station was a station in Lincolnshire on the line between Spalding and Sleaford.

Preceding station	Disused railways	Following station
Gosberton	GN and GE Joint Railway	Helpringham
