= Pinchbeck railway station =

Former railway station in Lincolnshire, England

Coordinates: 52.8161°N 0.1683°W

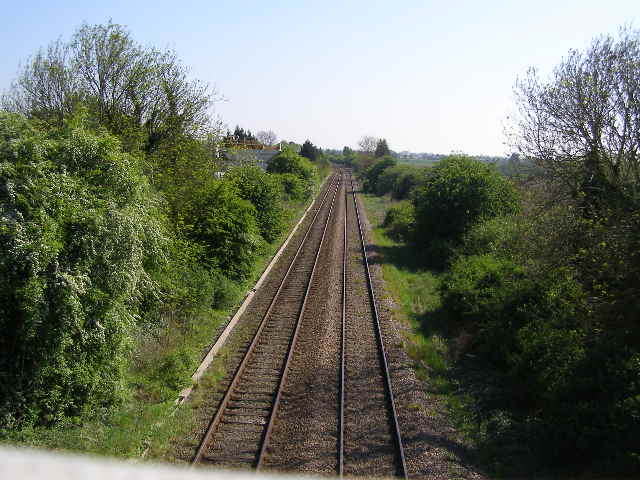
View south from road bridge over line. The heavily wooded area on the left is the site of the former station.

Pinchbeck railway station was a station in Pinchbeck, Lincolnshire, England on the line between Spalding and Sleaford. The station opened in 1882, closed to passengers in 1961 and closed entirely in 1964.

Preceding station	Disused railways	Following station
Spalding	GN and GE Joint Railway	Gosberton
