= Claypole Rural District =

Former local government area in the UK

Coordinates: 53.04°N 0.58°W

Claypole was a rural district in Lincolnshire, Parts of Kesteven from 1894 to 1931. It was formed under the Local Government Act 1894 from that part of the Newark-on-Trent rural sanitary district which was in Kesteven (the rest going to form the Newark Rural District in Nottinghamshire).

It was abolished in 1931 under a County Review Order, being split between the new rural districts of North Kesteven and West Kesteven.
