= Gosberton railway station =

Former railway station in Lincolnshire, England

Coordinates: 52.8556°N 0.1859°W

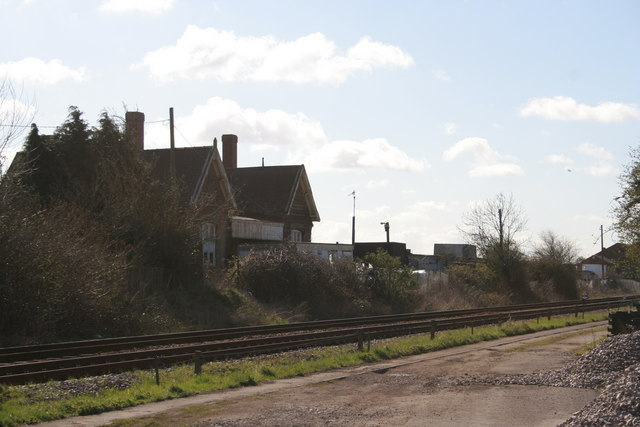
Former station buildings

Gosberton railway station was a station in Gosberton, Lincolnshire. It was opened in 1882 and closed for passengers on 11 September 1961 and freight on 7 December 1964.

Preceding station	Historical railways	Following station
Pinchbeck; Line open, station closed	GN and GE Joint Railway	Donington Road; Line open, station closed
