= Lenton Methodist Church =

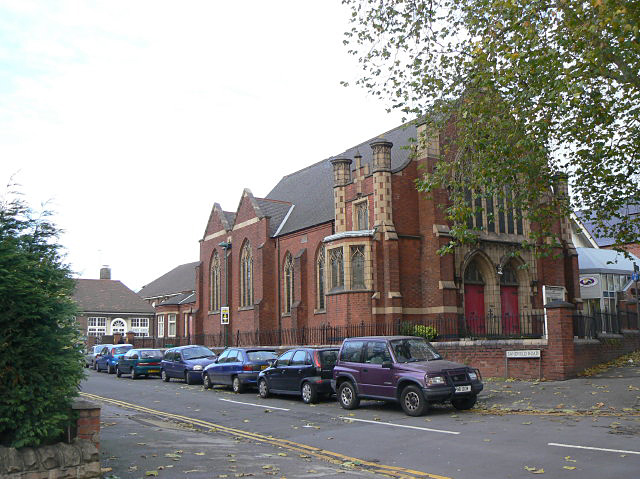
- Lenton Methodist Church
- 52.951806°N 1.173751°W
- Location: Lenton, Nottingham
- Country: England
- Denomination: Methodist

Architecture
- Architect: Albert Edward Lambert
- Completed: 1914
- Construction cost: £4,500

Lenton Methodist Church is a Methodist church on Derby Road in Lenton, Nottingham.

== History ==
Lenton Methodist Church was opened in 1914 and was designed by local architect Albert Edward Lambert. The cost of construction was £4,500 (equivalent to £448,936 in 2025) and it had seating for 450 worshippers, and 300 children in the attached schoolroom.

In the early 21st century, the church hall was adapted for use by God's Vineyard Church.

== Organ ==
The pipe organ by Charles Lloyd was transferred here in 1939 by E. Wragg & Son from Crocus Street Hall. A specification of the organ can be found on the National Pipe Organ Register.
