= Mapperley Methodist Church =

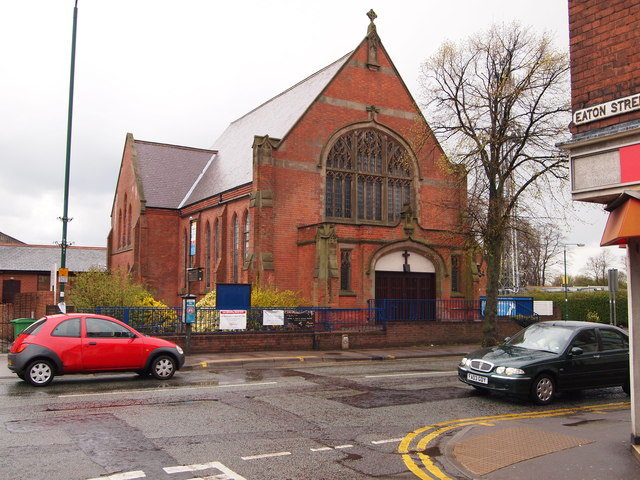
- Mapperley Methodist Church
- Mapperley Methodist Church
- 52.981321°N 1.12761°W
- Country: England
- Denomination: Wesleyan Methodist

Architecture
- Architect: Albert Edward Lambert
- Groundbreaking: 1903
- Completed: 1904
- Construction cost: £3,191

Mapperley Methodist Church is an active Methodist church on Woodborough Road in Mapperley, Nottingham.

== History ==
The building of the church started in 1903 to designs by local architect Albert Edward Lambert. The congregation occupied the building for the first time in October 1904. It cost around £3,191 (equivalent to £335,461 in 2025).

The church underwent a major restoration in 2009 including the provision of a lift, toilets for disabled people, new kitchen facilities and hearing induction loop at a cost of £154,000.
