= West Kesteven Rural District =

Rural district in Lincolnshire, Parts of Kesteven, England from 1931 to 1974

Coordinates: 52.9°N 0.65°W

West Kesteven was a rural district in Lincolnshire, Parts of Kesteven, England from 1931 to 1974.

It was formed under a County Review Order, by the merger of most of the Grantham Rural District, part of the Sleaford Rural District and much of the Claypole Rural District.

It was abolished in 1974 under the Local Government Act 1972, being merged into the new South Kesteven.
