= Burton Pedwardine =

Hamlet and civil parish in the district of North Kesteven, Lincolnshire, England

Coordinates: 52.965228°N 0.33612°W

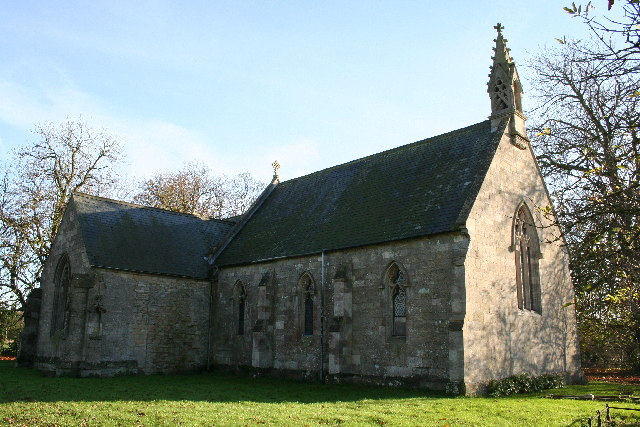
- St Andrew's Church, Burton Pedwardine

- Location within Lincolnshire
- Population: 187 (2011)
- OS grid reference: TF 11850 42169
  - London: 100 mi (160 km) S
- District: North Kesteven
- Shire county: Lincolnshire
- Region: East Midlands
- Country: England
- Sovereign state: United Kingdom
- Post town: Sleaford
- Postcode district: NG34
- Police: Lincolnshire
- Fire: Lincolnshire
- Ambulance: East Midlands
- UK Parliament: Sleaford and North Hykeham

Burton Pedwardine is a hamlet and civil parish in the district of North Kesteven, Lincolnshire, England. The population at the 2011 census was 187. The hamlet is situated approximately 4 miles (6 km) south-east from the market town of Sleaford and south-west of the village of Heckington.

Burton Pedwardine is named after a Herefordshire family, the Pedwardines, who acquired the hall and manor through marriage about 1330.

The village Grade II listed Anglican parish church is dedicated to St Andrew. It was rebuilt by Sir Roger Pedwardine in the early 14th century on a cruciform plan with central tower. The tower collapsed in 1802, and the church was rebuilt. It was again rebuilt in Decorated style in 1870, retaining its original transept from the pre-1802 church. A grille for the exhibition of relics, and a lead effigy of Dame Alice Pedwardine (c.1350), wife of Roger, lie in the east wall. Against the west wall is the tomb of Thomas Horsman (d. 1610), with effigies of Horsman and his wife Mary. The west wall contains decorative Saxon and Norman elements.

The parish holds the site of Mareham Grange, which was the property of Sir Thomas Horsman in the late 16th, early 17th century. Earlier it was held by the now-vanished Sempringham Priory in Lincolnshire. The site may also have been the location of Mareham or Cold Mareham, a lost medieval village. Near the Mareham Grange earthworks is the base of a 15th-century wayside cross.

A further Grade II listed building is Glebe Farmhouse on the village's Main Street.

A notable murder occurred in the parish in 1728, when Captain Thomas Mitchell, a justice of the peace, killed a bailiff named Pennystone Warden of Ewerby. The captain was committed to Lincoln Castle by two of his fellow magistrates and subsequently sentenced to death at Lincoln Assizes.

The Peterborough to Lincoln Railway Line runs past the village with both Scredington Road and White Cross Lane passing over the railway.
