= Boughton, Lincolnshire =

Hamlet in Lincolnshire, England

Coordinates: 52.997°N 0.327°W

Boughton
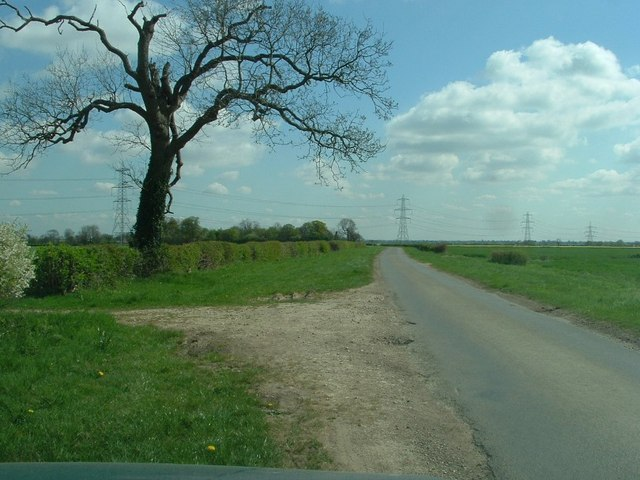
- Farm track in Boughton

- Location within Lincolnshire
- OS grid reference: TF1245
- Shire county: Lincolnshire
- Region: East Midlands
- Country: England
- Sovereign state: United Kingdom
- Post town: Sleaford
- Postcode district: NG34
- Police: Lincolnshire
- Fire: Lincolnshire
- Ambulance: East Midlands

Boughton is a hamlet in Lincolnshire, England. It is in the civil parish of Asgarby and Howell.
