= Mediq =

Dutch healthcare products company

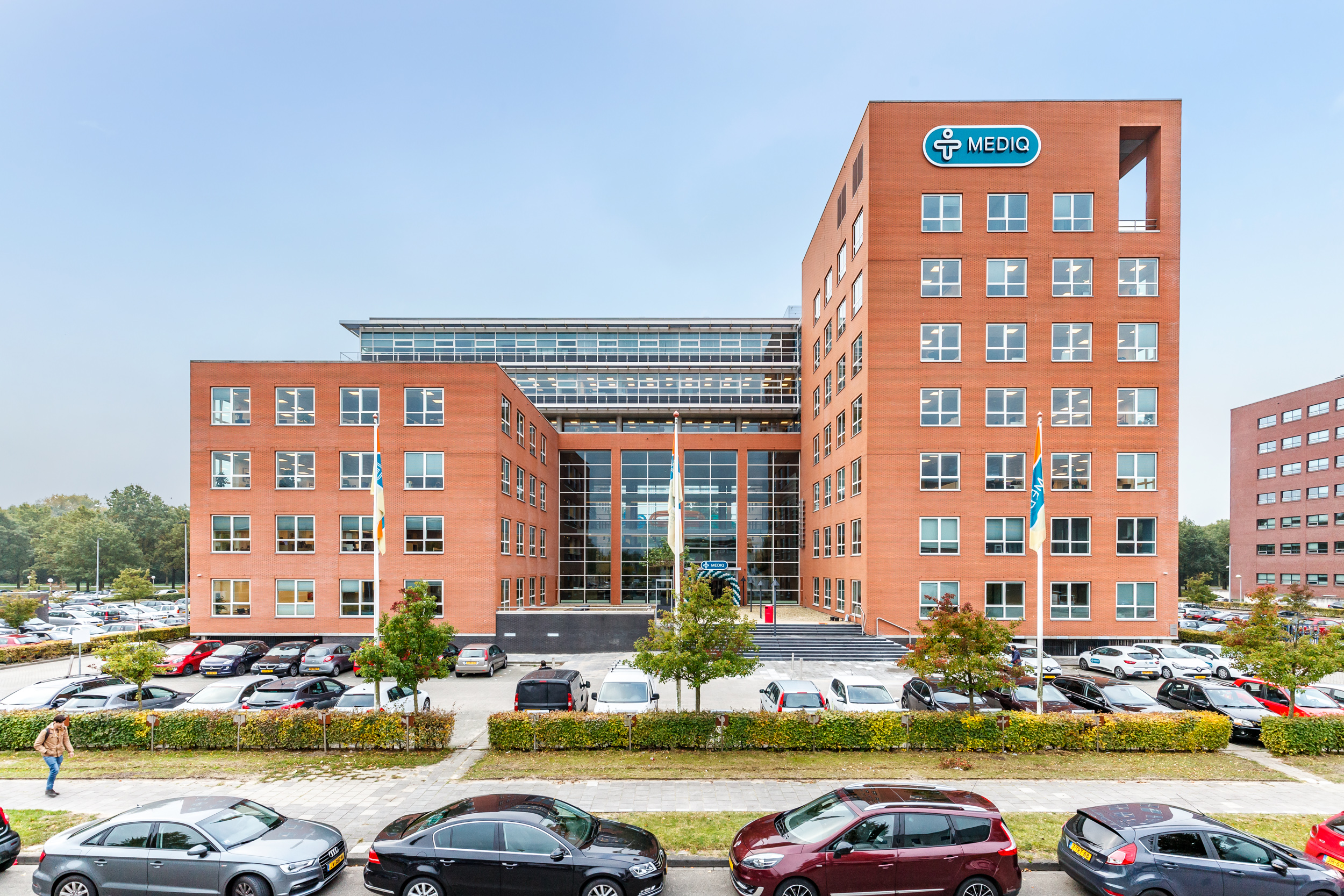
- Mediq headquarters (Utrecht)
- Company type: Naamloze vennootschap
- Industry: Healthcare
- Founded: 1899
- Headquarters: Rijnzathe 10, 3454 PV; Utrecht, Netherlands
- Area served: Netherlands, Poland, Germany, Denmark, Belgium, Sweden, Norway, France, Finland, Hungary, Switzerland, Estonia, Latvia, Lithuania, United States
- Key people: Arjen Linders (CEO)
- Products: Medicine, medical supplies, home delivery
- Website: www.mediq.com

Mediq is a Dutch health care company, which provides pharmaceuticals and medical supplies, by operating apothecaries and by delivering to medical centres and patients. The company is active in 15 countries and in 2012 had a revenue of €2.61 billion. Since 2013, it has been owned by Advent International.

== History ==
Founded in 1899 as "Onderlinge Pharmaceutische Groothandel" (English: Mutual Pharmaceutical Wholesale Company), it was a cooperative association of apothecaries who did not want medicine to be supplied by unauthorised people, and who started creating their own pharmaceuticals on a small scale. Over time activities increased and in 1988 it was renamed as "Coöperatieve Apothekers Vereniging OPG U.A." (English: Cooperative Apothecaries Association OPG U.A.) - wholesale was removed from the name, however it remained in the abbreviation OPG.

In 1992 the company was listed on the Amsterdam Stock Exchange and this was followed on 10 January 2001 when the association became a joint-stock company (naamloze vennootschap) under the name "OPG Groep NV" (English: OPG Group NV). In 2009 the name was finally changed to Mediq NV, the current official name.

In a 2011 tactical analysis by Mediq it was concluded that leaving the stock exchange and becoming a privately owned company, was the best longterm strategy. Advent International expressed interest in purchasing the company in 2012. On 13 February 2013 they bought the stocks and on 13 March 2013 Mediq left the stockmarket.

The Direct & Institutional division providing medical devices and care remained with Mediq. The subsidiary in the Americas (Byram Healthcare) was sold in 2017. In June 2017, Mediq acquired ACC Nordic AS and ACC Nordic AB, followed in May 2019 by the acquisition of Puls, a distributor of medical products and equipment in Norway and Denmark. Since March 2020, English wound care products distributor H&R Healthcare Ltd has also been part of Mediq. These acquisitions were related to the company's business strategy of directly supplying medical devices to patients, healthcare professionals and healthcare institutions in Europe.

== Activities ==
Mediq provides pharmaceuticals and medical supplies. It has its own chain of apothecaries, supplies other medical centres, and supplies to patients directly at home. They are the market leader in the Netherlands with 226 of their own pharmacies, about 25 franchises, and supplies another 160 pharmacies. The company is active in the Netherlands, Poland, Germany, Denmark, Belgium, Sweden, Norway, France, Finland, Hungary, Switzerland, Estonia, Latvia, Lithuania and the United States. Their headquarters are located in Utrecht, Netherlands.
