= Heckington =

Village and civil parish in the North Kesteven district of Lincolnshire, England

Coordinates: 52°58′54″N 0°18′03″W

- Location within Lincolnshire
- Population: 3,353 (2011 census)
- OS grid reference: TF145435
  - London: 100 mi (160 km) S
- District: North Kesteven
- Shire county: Lincolnshire
- Region: East Midlands
- Country: England
- Sovereign state: United Kingdom
- Post town: SLEAFORD
- Postcode district: NG34
- Dialling code: 01529
- Police: Lincolnshire
- Fire: Lincolnshire
- Ambulance: East Midlands
- UK Parliament: Grantham and Bourne

Heckington is a village and civil parish in the North Kesteven district of Lincolnshire, England. It is situated between Sleaford and Swineshead Bridge, and south of the A17 road. Heckington, with 1,491 households, is one of the largest villages in Lincolnshire. The population of the civil parish including Boughton was 3,353 at the 2011 census.

== History ==
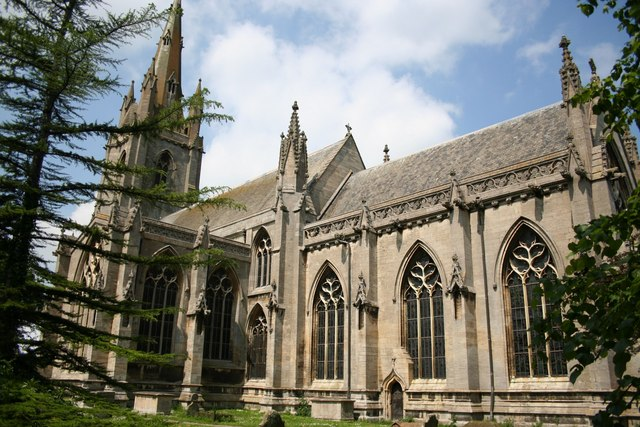
St Andrew's Church, Heckington

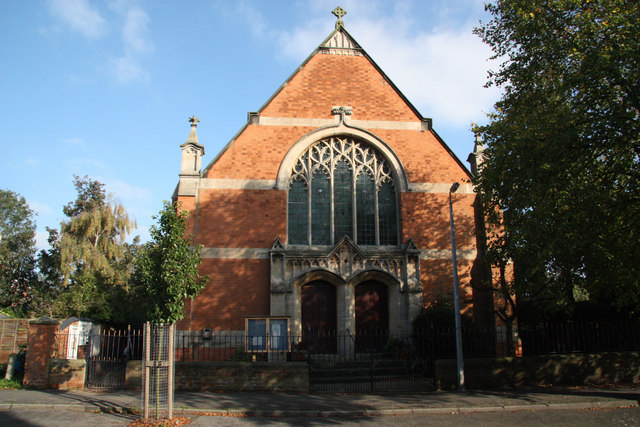
Heckington Methodist Church

=== Church and chapel ===
St. Andrew's Church, Heckington is Grade I listed. It is an Anglican parish church dedicated to St Andrew. Its plan is cruciform, and its style fully Decorated Gothic. The original 14th-century church was acquired by Bardney Abbey in 1345, and subsequently a new chancel was built by vicar Richard de Potesgrave, chaplain to Edward III. Potesgrave's damaged effigy is within the church; other memorials include brasses to John Cawdron (d. 1438), and William Cawdron "baylyf of Hekington" and his two wives. The steeple is from 1360 to 1370; it was rebuilt in 1888 as part of a restoration, after a previous church restoration of 1867. Over the south porch are the arms of Edward the Confessor, adopted by Richard II in 1380. The tall spire of the church reaches 176 feet (54 metres) high.

The church has original stained glass windows, one of which depicts the construction of the Decorated style building itself. The church was featured in 2007 on the Divine Designs programme on Channel Five narrated by historian Paul Binski.

In 1885, Kelly's Directory reported the existence of one Baptist and two Wesleyan chapels, and in Heckington Fen a chapel of ease in Early English style and chapels for Primitive and Reformed Methodists. The Methodist church was built in 1904.

=== Windmill ===
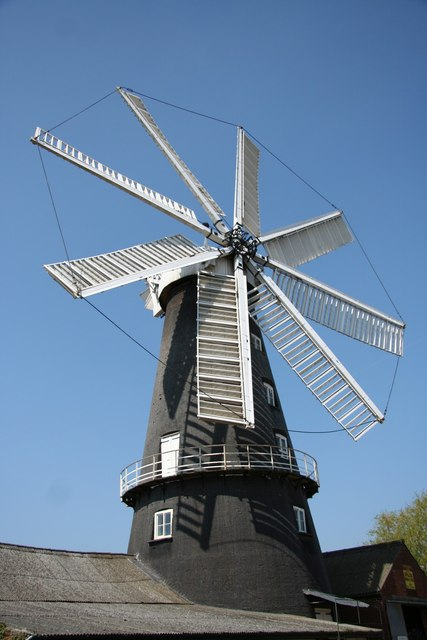
Eight-sailed windmill, Heckington

The nearly 1,000-year-old village (first mentioned in the 10th century) is best known for its windmill of the same name, the only 8-sailed example of its type still standing in the UK and Europe. The tower windmill built as a five-sailed mill in 1830 and turned into an eight-sailed mill after serious storm damage in 1890–92 was formerly (and sometimes still today) named Pocklington's Mill after its last owner John Pocklington. In 1986 the windmill underwent restoration.

On 28 June 1993, RAF GR7 Harrier ZD430 of 3 Squadron travelling from RAF Leeming to Germany crashed south-west of the village towards Burton Pedwardine. The pilot ejected at 3,000 ft and survived.

== Geography ==
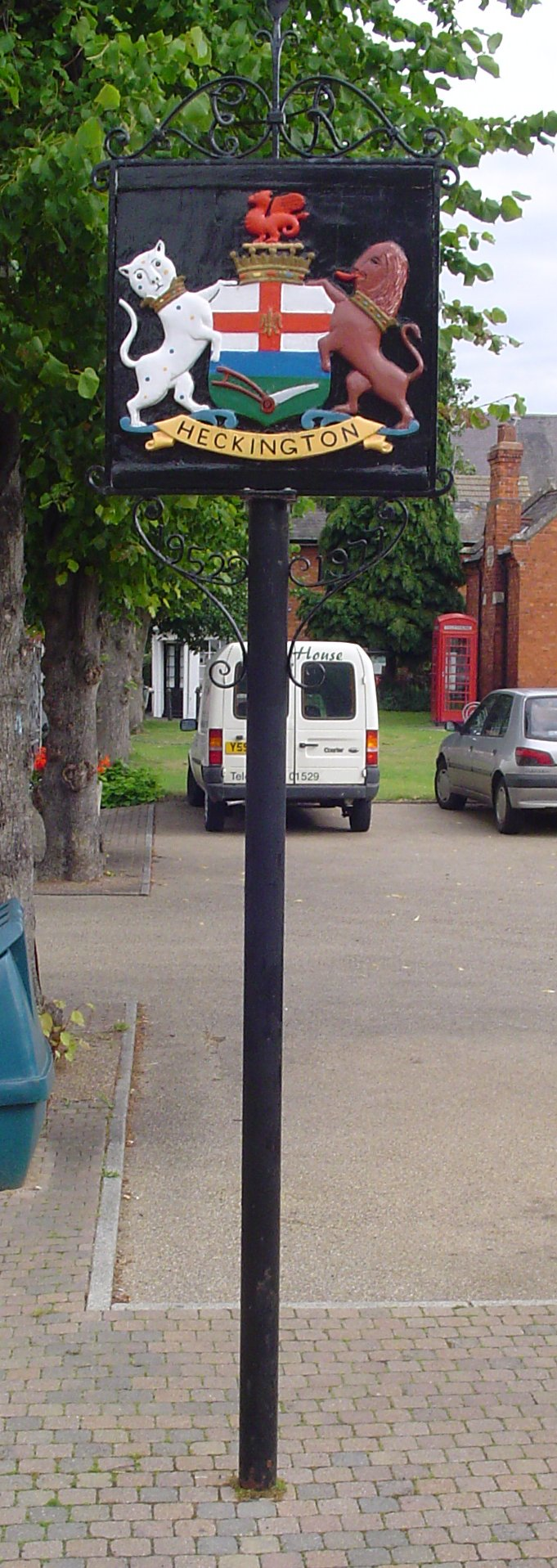
Village Sign in Heckington

The £2.5 million 2 3/4-mile-long (4.5-kilometre) village bypass, built by Reed & Mallik of Salisbury, was opened by Lynda Chalker on 14 December 1982, and the former route of the A17 is now the B1394, which also leads to Billingborough via Great Hale across a level crossing over the partially single-track railway near the railway station. The village has three level crossings.

Another linear settlement of East Heckington lies alongside the A17 road two miles (three kilometres) east of Heckington. To the north is Howell, which is part of the parish.

Heckington falls within the drainage area of the Black Sluice Internal Drainage Board.

The parish boundary meets Kirkby la Thorpe west of Mead's Farm on the A17. North of there it meets Asgarby and Howell, which includes part of Heckington's religious parish. It follows north of the A17 eastwards then along Heckington Eau, across Washdike Bridge to the north of Star Fen. It crosses Car Dyke where it meets South Kyme and follows Head Dike eastwards, across Sidebar Lane (B1395) at Five Willow Wath Bridge. This is the point where the NG, LN and PE postcodes meet. At the north-south Holland Dike, it meets Amber Hill, and the Borough of Boston, becoming the North Kesteven boundary. West of here is Heckington Fen, and east of the boundary is Algarkirk Fen. At the junction of Holland Dike and Skerth Drain, near Six Hundreds Farm, it meets Swineshead. It follows Holland Dike southwards to Rake's Farm, north of the A17, meeting Great Hale. West of here the boundary meets the A17 at Maize farm, crossing Labour in Vain Drain.

The boundary follows the A17 westwards, north of Poplars Farm. South of Garwick Farm it crosses Car Dyke and Carterplot Road. 330 yards (300 metres) south of the level crossing is the division between Great Hale and Heckington, following the Beck westwards to the Burton Pedwardine road, where it meets Burton Pedwardine near a small copse. West of Whitehouse Farm it follows south of the railway westwards, meeting Kirkby la Thorpe north of Lodge Farm.

== Education ==
There is one voluntary controlled primary school in the village: Heckington St Andrew's Church of England School. In 2012, it had 201 pupils on roll and was graded "good" by Ofsted. A National School opened in Heckington in the 1830s and was located on Cameron Street from 1873. In 1951, it became a Church of England controlled school, new buildings were opened on Howell Road in 1962 and the school has used its current name since 1999.

Heckington falls within the catchment area of the three secondary schools in Sleaford, each of which has a Sixth Form and has been rated "good" by Ofsted: Carre's Grammar School (male grammar school), Kesteven and Sleaford High School Selective Academy (female grammar school) and St George's Academy (mixed non-selective secondary school). The grammar schools are based in Sleaford, but St George's operates across two sites (one at Sleaford, the other at Ruskington) where pupils are educated separately; the Sixth Form, however, is based solely at Sleaford. The grammar schools require students to sit the Eleven plus exam, but St George's is not selective.

== Community ==
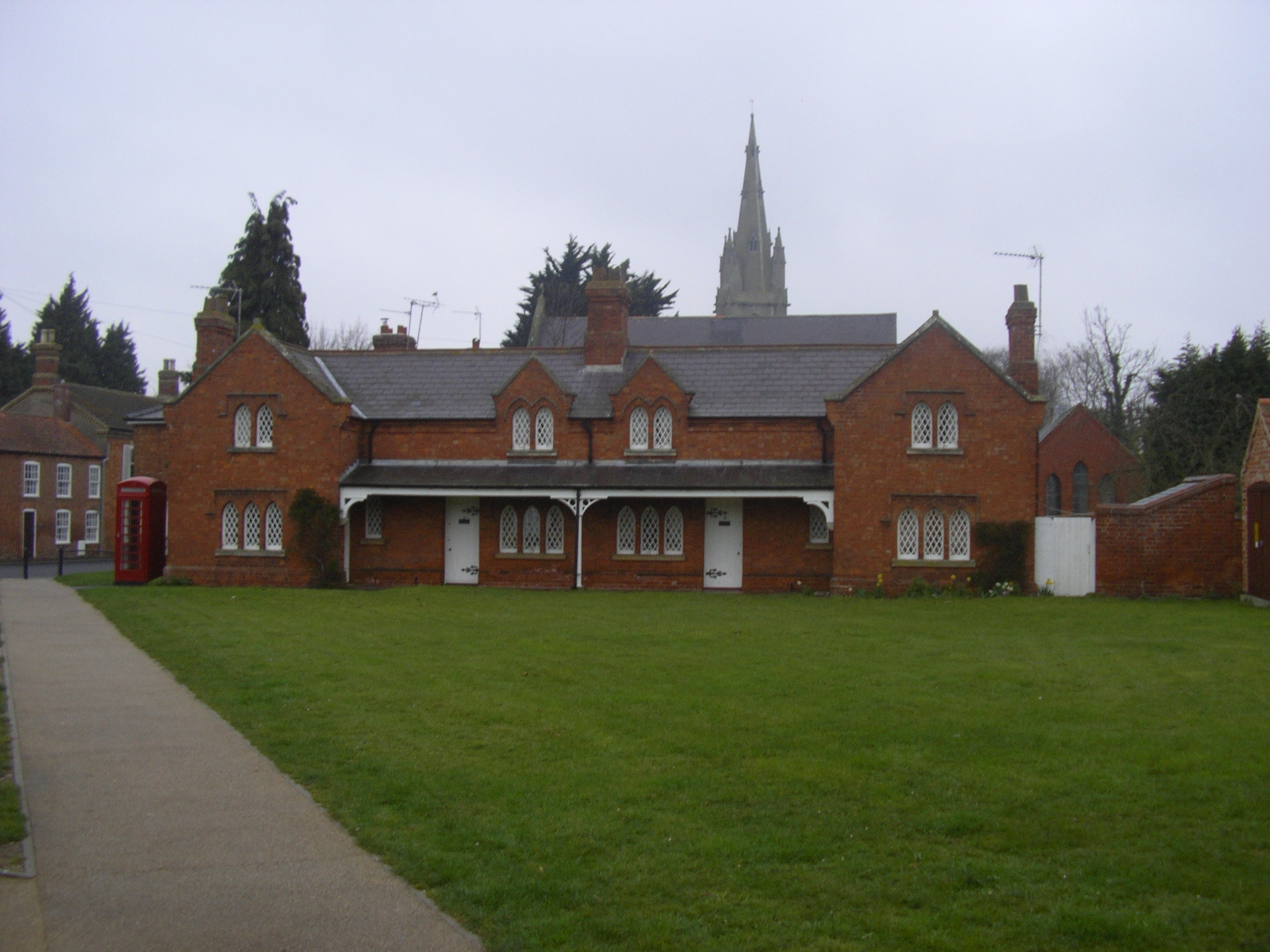
The village green and church spire

The Heckington Show has been held annually in the village over the last weekend in July since 1864. The 2020 Show was cancelled due to the COVID-19 pandemic.

The village's 1859-built Heckington railway station is a railway museum. Village amenities include a swimming pool, a Co-op store, a butchers and a greengrocers.

Heritage Lincolnshire and Archaeological Project Services, its commercial wing, are based in the village.

Ecotricity have been given permission to build a 22-turbine wind farm on Heckington Fen. It should generate enough electricity for about 40,000 homes. The site is next to a line of 400 kV pylons.

The village has its own magazine, published periodically (Heckington Living), and an internet radio station (Heckington Living Community Radio or 'HLR'). The village has a community website.

== Notable people ==
- Tom Edwards, television and radio presenter; one of the original DJ's on board Radio Caroline.
- Abi Titmuss
- Joseph Toynbee, the otologist and ear surgeon was born in the village on 30 December 1830.
