= Sleaford Rural District =

Former local government area in the UK

Coordinates: 53.02°N 0.36°W

Sleaford was a rural district in Lincolnshire, Parts of Kesteven, England, from 1894 to 1931.

It was created by the Local Government Act 1894 based on the Sleaford rural sanitary district. In 1931, under a County Review Order, it was abolished, with a small part going to West Kesteven Rural District, the parishes of Leadenham, Welbourn and Wellingore going to North Kesteven Rural District, and the larger part going to the East Kesteven Rural District.
