= Kesteven =

Traditional division of Lincolnshire, England

Coordinates: 52.9167°N 0.6333°W

Lincolnshire, Parts of Kesteven
- History
  - Created: 1889
  - Abolished: 1974
  - Succeeded by: Lincolnshire
- Status: Administrative county
- Government: Kesteven County Council
  - HQ: Sleaford

The Parts of Kesteven (/ˈkɛstəvən/ or /kəˈstiːvən/) are a traditional division of Lincolnshire, England. This division had long had a separate county administration (quarter sessions), along with the two other Parts of Lincolnshire, Lindsey and Holland.

== Etymology ==
The name Kesteven is first attested in the late tenth century Latin translation of the Anglo-Saxon Chronicle by Æthelweard, in the form Ceoftefne (agreed by scholars to be a scribal error for Ceostefne). The name appears in the Domesday Book of 1086 as Chetsteven and from 1185 as Ketsteuene. The first part of the name comes from the Common Brittonic word *ceto- ("woodland"), still found in Modern Welsh as coed. The second element is the Old Norse word stefna ("meeting place"). The name, therefore, means "meeting place at Coed, i.e. the wood".

== Administrative areas ==
=== Wapentakes and Sokes ===
Historically, Lincolnshire was divided into wapentakes, hundreds and sokes. The following made up Kesteven:

- Aswardhurn Wapentake
- Aveland Wapentake
- Beltisloe Wapentake
- Boothby Graffoe Wapentake
- Flaxwell Wapentake
- Langoe Wapentake
- Lovedon Wapentake
- Ness Wapentake
- Winnibriggs and Threo Wapentake
- Borough and Soke of Grantham
- Stamford Borough

=== Local Government Act 1888 ===
The three parts were given separate elected county councils in 1889 by the Local Government Act 1888, and recognised as administrative counties. Kesteven lies in the south-west of Lincolnshire. It includes the towns of:

- Bourne
- Bracebridge
- Grantham
- Market Deeping
- Sleaford
- Stamford

=== Local Government Act 1894 ===
Under the Local Government Act 1894 Kesteven was divided into a number of rural district and urban districts based on earlier sanitary districts:

- Bourne Rural District
- Branston Rural District
- Grantham Rural District
- Claypole Rural District
- Sleaford Rural District
- Uffington Rural District

The urban districts and boroughs were:

- Bourne
- Bracebridge
- Grantham (borough)
- Ruskington
- Sleaford
- Stamford (borough)

Bourne Urban District was abolished in 1920, with Bourne becoming a parish in Bourne Rural District. Bracebridge became part of the county borough of Lincoln that same year, becoming associated with the Parts of Lindsey.

=== Local Government Act 1929 ===
The rural districts were re-organised by a County Review Order in 1929, to create four new districts named after points of the compass:

- East Kesteven Rural District
- North Kesteven Rural District
- South Kesteven Rural District
- West Kesteven Rural District

=== Local Government Act 1972 ===
These separate county councils were abolished in 1974 and Lincolnshire (minus the northern part of Lindsey) had a single county council for the first time, although the names of the Parts survive in some of the names of district councils. Under the Local Government Act 1972, the four rural districts in Kesteven, along with the boroughs and urban district, merged into two district councils:

- North Kesteven District Council - A merger of North and East Rural Districts and Sleaford Urban District
- South Kesteven District Council - A merger of South and West Rural Districts and the boroughs of Grantham and Stamford

== Titles of nobility associated with Kesteven ==
- The title of Baron Kesteven existed from 1868 until 1915.
- The title of Duke of Ancaster and Kesteven existed from 1715 to 1809.
- Margaret Thatcher, former Prime Minister of the United Kingdom and Kesteven native, chose 'of Kesteven' as the territorial designation for her life peerage in 1992, becoming Baroness Thatcher, of Kesteven in the County of Lincolnshire.

== See also ==
- Parts of Lindsey
- Parts of Holland
- Rutland
- Huntingdonshire
- Isle of Ely
- Soke of Peterborough
