= East Kesteven Rural District =

Former local government area in the UK

Coordinates: 53.00°N 0.35°W

East Kesteven was a rural district in Lincolnshire, Parts of Kesteven from 1931 to 1974. It was formed under a County Review Order, by the merger of most of the Sleaford Rural District and the parish of Haceby from Grantham Rural District.

The district was abolished in 1974 under the Local Government Act 1972, going to form part of the new North Kesteven district.
