= North Kesteven =

Coordinates: 53.15°N 0.50°W

North Kesteven District
- District
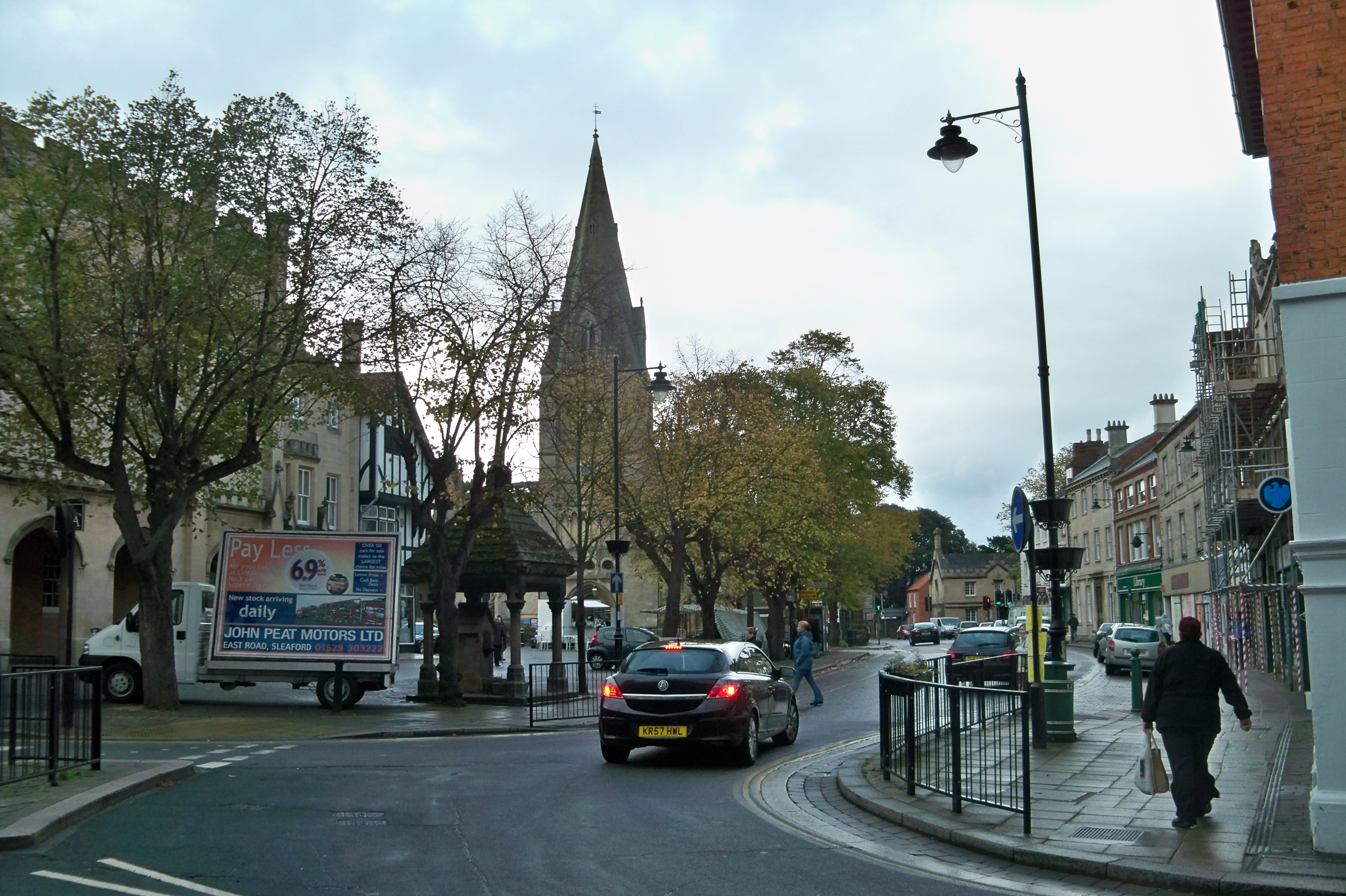
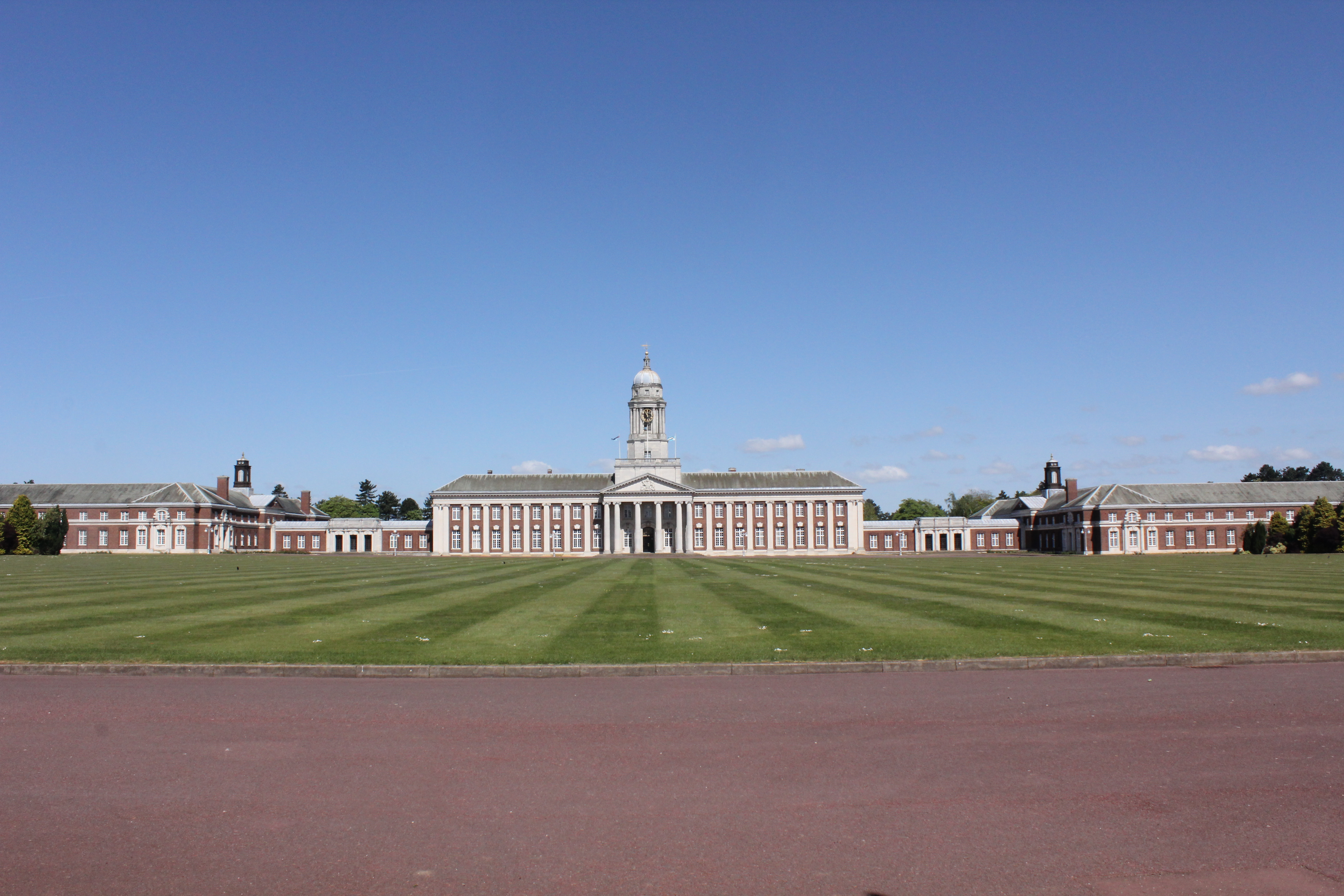
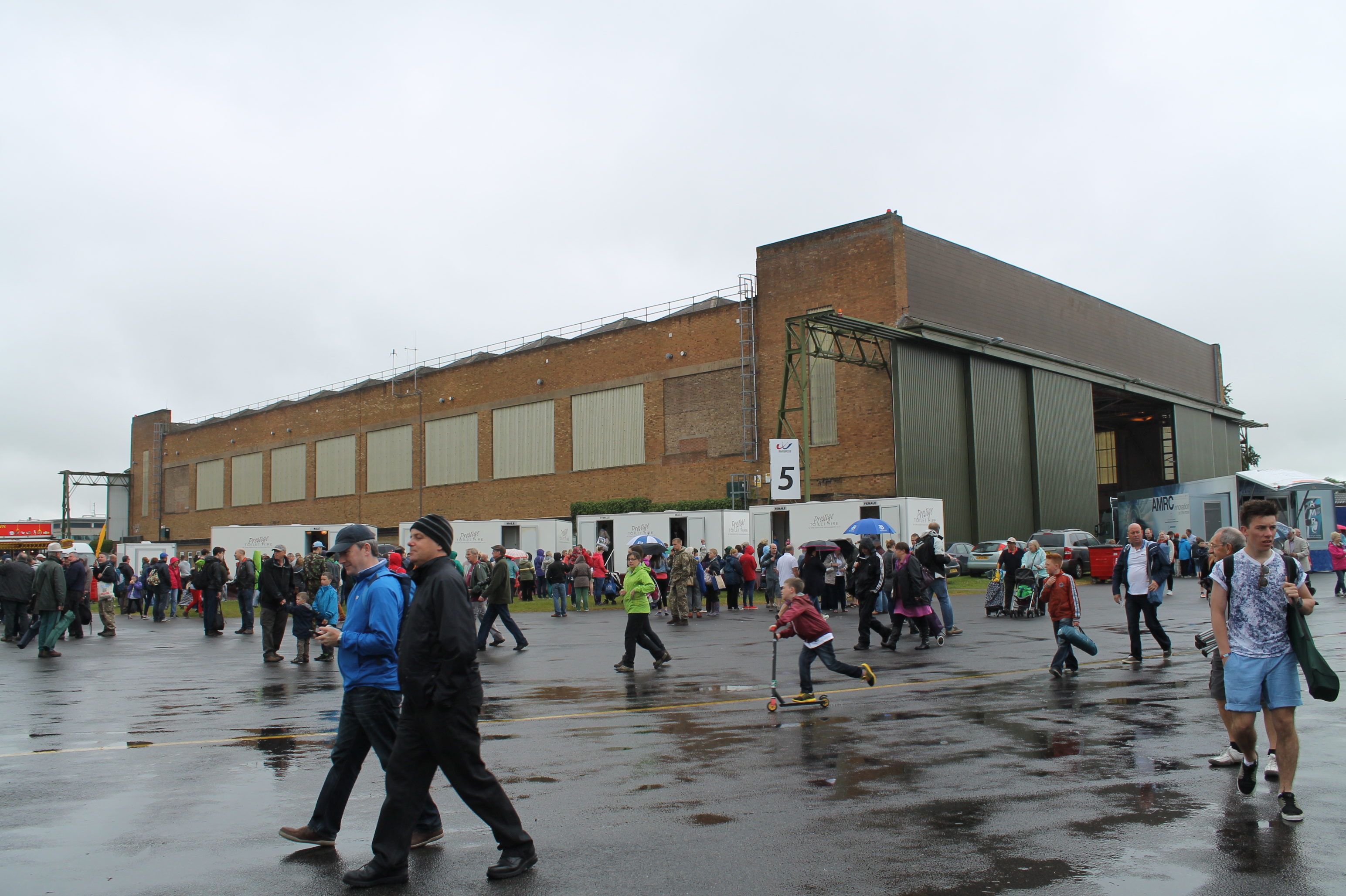
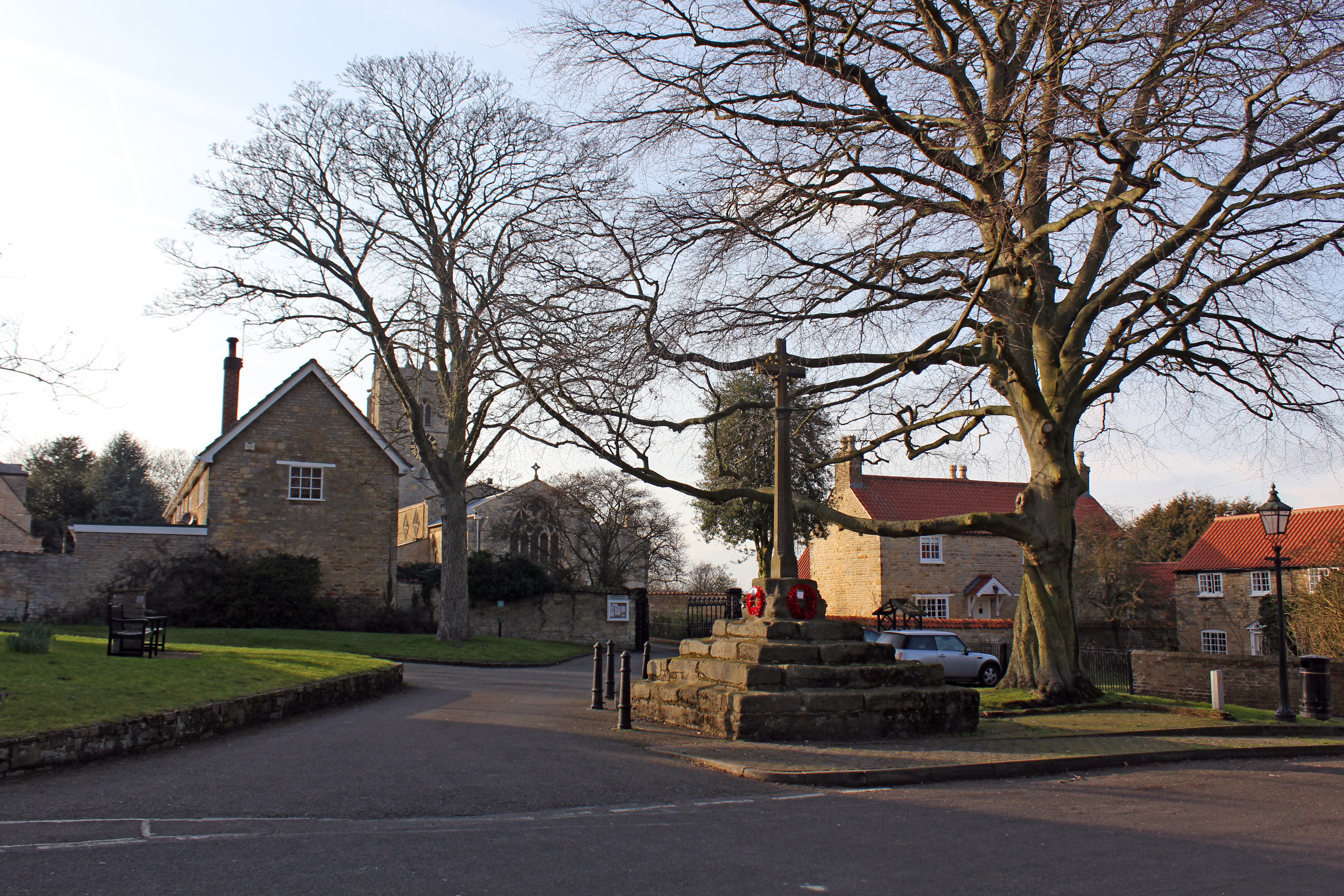
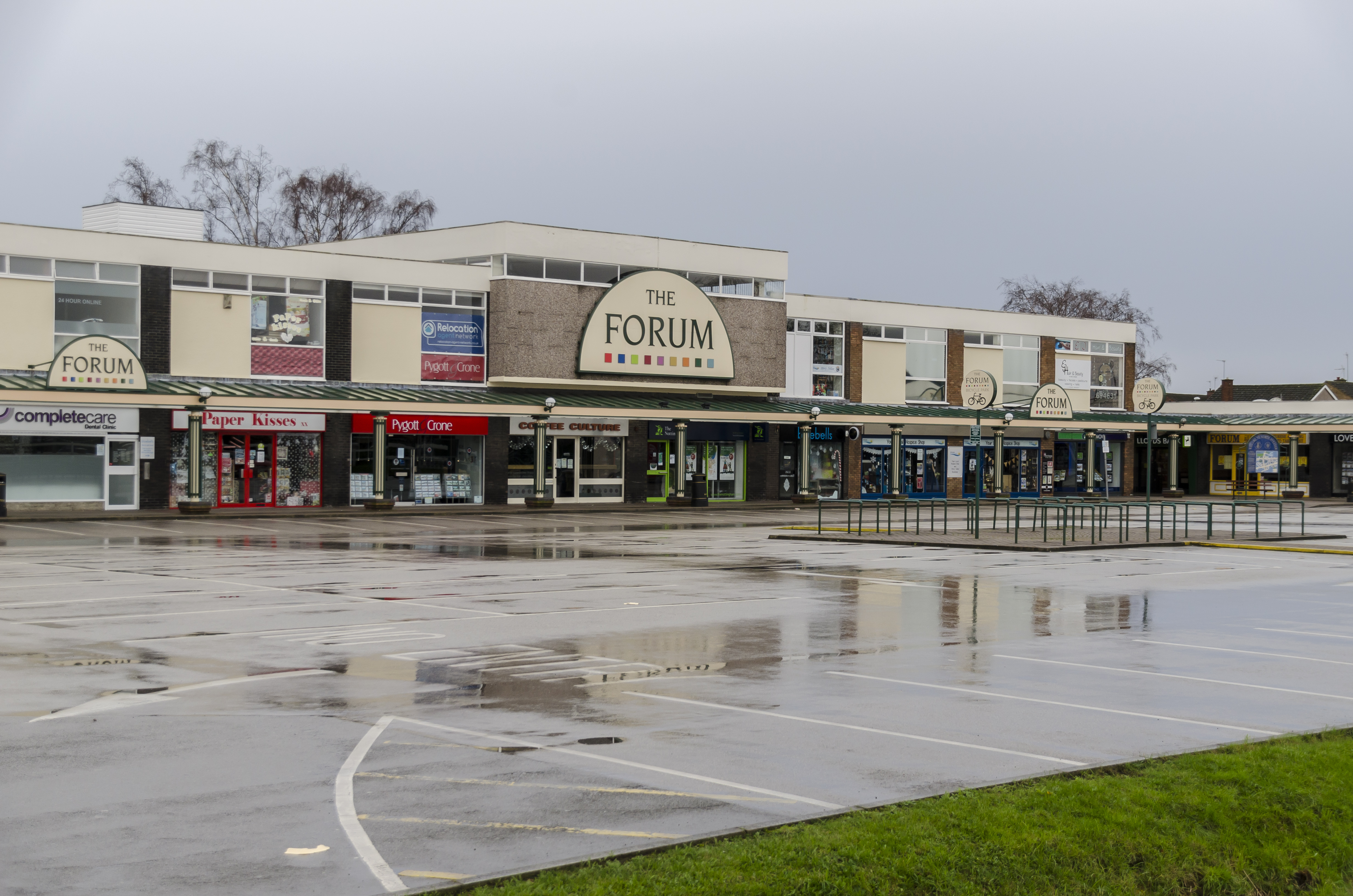
- From left to right; Top: Sleaford; Middle: RAF Cranwell college hall and Hangar 5 at RAF Waddington; Bottom: Washingborough village cross and The Forum shopping centre in North Hykeham

- Shown within the ceremonial county of Lincolnshire
- Sovereign state: United Kingdom
- Constituent country: England
- Region: East Midlands
- Administrative county: Lincolnshire
- Founded: 1 April 1974
- Admin. HQ: Sleaford

Government
  - Type: North Kesteven District Council
  - Leadership: Leader & Cabinet
  - MPs: Caroline Johnson; Hamish Falconer

Area
  - Total: 356 sq mi (922 km^{2})
  - Rank: 30th

Population (2024)
  - Total: 122,468
  - Rank: Ranked 201st
  - Density: 344/sq mi (133/km^{2})

Ethnicity (2021)
  - Ethnic groups: List: 97.2% White; 1.2% Mixed; 1% Asian; 0.4% Black; 0.2% other

Religion (2021)
  - Religion: List: 56.6% Christianity; 41.8% no religion; 0.5% Islam; 1.1% other
- Time zone: UTC+0 (Greenwich Mean Time)
  - Summer (DST): UTC+1 (British Summer Time)
- ONS code: 32UE (ONS); E07000139 (GSS)
- Ethnicity: 98.9% White

North Kesteven is a local government district in Lincolnshire, England. The council is based in Sleaford. The district also contains the town of North Hykeham, which adjoins the neighbouring city of Lincoln, along with numerous villages and surrounding rural areas.

The neighbouring districts are Lincoln, West Lindsey, East Lindsey, Boston, South Holland, South Kesteven and Newark and Sherwood.

== History ==
The district was formed on 1 April 1974 under the Local Government Act 1972. It covered the area of three former districts from the administrative county of Kesteven, which were all abolished at the same time:

- East Kesteven Rural District
- North Kesteven Rural District
- Sleaford Urban District

The new district was named North Kesteven referencing its position within Kesteven, one of the three historic parts of Lincolnshire.

Under current local government reorganisation plans, all district councils in Lincolnshire, as well as the county council, will be abolished in 2028, with the district being split between new Lincoln and Lincolnshire unitary authorities.

== Governance ==
North Kesteven District Council

Type
- Type: Non-metropolitan district

Leadership
- Chair: Christine Collard, Conservative since 14 May 2026
- Leader: Richard Wright, Conservative since 30 March 2017
- Chief Executive: Kath Marriott since 2024

Structure
- Seats: 43 councillors
- Graph of the party split among 43 seats.
- Political groups: Administration (25) Conservative (25) Other parties (18) Lincolnshire Ind. (8) Labour (2) Reform (2) Liberal Democrats (1) Independent (5)

Elections
- Last election: 4 May 2023
- Last election: 6 May 2027

Meeting place
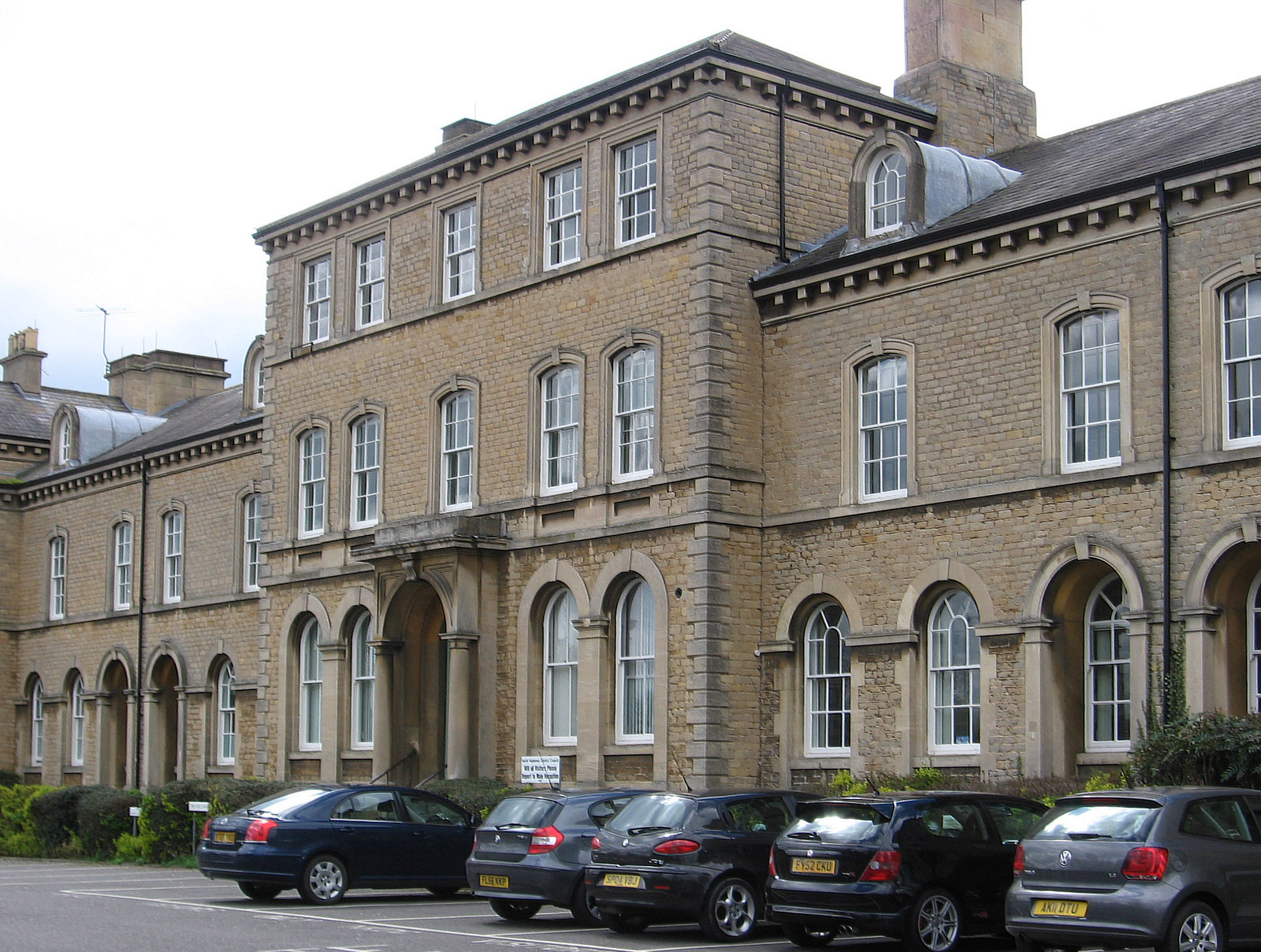
- Council Offices, Kesteven Street, Sleaford, NG34 7EF

Website
- www.n-kesteven.gov.uk

North Kesteven District Council provides district-level services. County-level services are provided by Lincolnshire County Council. The whole district is also covered by civil parishes, which form a third tier of local government.

=== Political control ===
The council has been under Conservative majority control since the 2023 election.

The first election to the council was held in 1973, initially operating as a shadow authority alongside the outgoing authorities until the new arrangements came into effect on 1 April 1974. Political control of the council since 1974 has been as follows:

| Party in control | Years |
|---|---|
| Independent | 1974–1987 |
| No overall control | 1987–2007 |
| Conservative | 2007–2019 |
| No overall control | 2019–2023 |
| Conservative | 2023–present |

=== Leadership ===
The leaders of the council since 2001 have been:

| Councillor | Party | From | To |
|---|---|---|---|
| Marion Brighton | Conservative | 2001 | 9 Mar 2017 |
| Richard Wright | Conservative | 30 Mar 2017 | |

=== Composition ===
Following the 2023 election, and subsequent by-elections and changes of allegiance up to March 2026, the composition of the council was:

| Party | Seats |
|---|---|
| Conservative | 25 |
| Lincolnshire Independent | 8 |
| Labour | 2 |
| Reform | 2 |
| Liberal Democrats | 1 |
| Independent | 5 |
| Total | 43 |

Three of the independent councillors sit together as the "Group of Unaligned Members", and the other two do not belong to any group. The next election is due in 2027.

=== Premises ===
The council is based at the North Kesteven Council Offices at the corner of Kesteven Street and East Gate in Sleaford. The building had been built in 1856 as a row of houses called Lafford Terrace. It was purchased in 1925 by Kesteven County Council and converted to become its headquarters.

When local government was reorganised in 1974, it was originally planned to have North Kesteven's offices in Bracebridge Hall on Newark Road in Lincoln, then the base of North Kesteven Rural District Council. In November 1973, a decision was taken to base it in The Hoplands in Sleaford, the base of East Kesteven Rural District Council. In January 1974 it was realised that this building was too small for the size needed, and the 81 rooms of Kesteven County Council's headquarters in Sleaford would suit the new council instead. The Hoplands was subsequently demolished for housing.

=== Elections ===
Since the last boundary changes in 2023 the council has comprised 43 councillors representing 24 wards, with each ward electing one, two or three councillors. Elections are held every four years.

== Geography ==
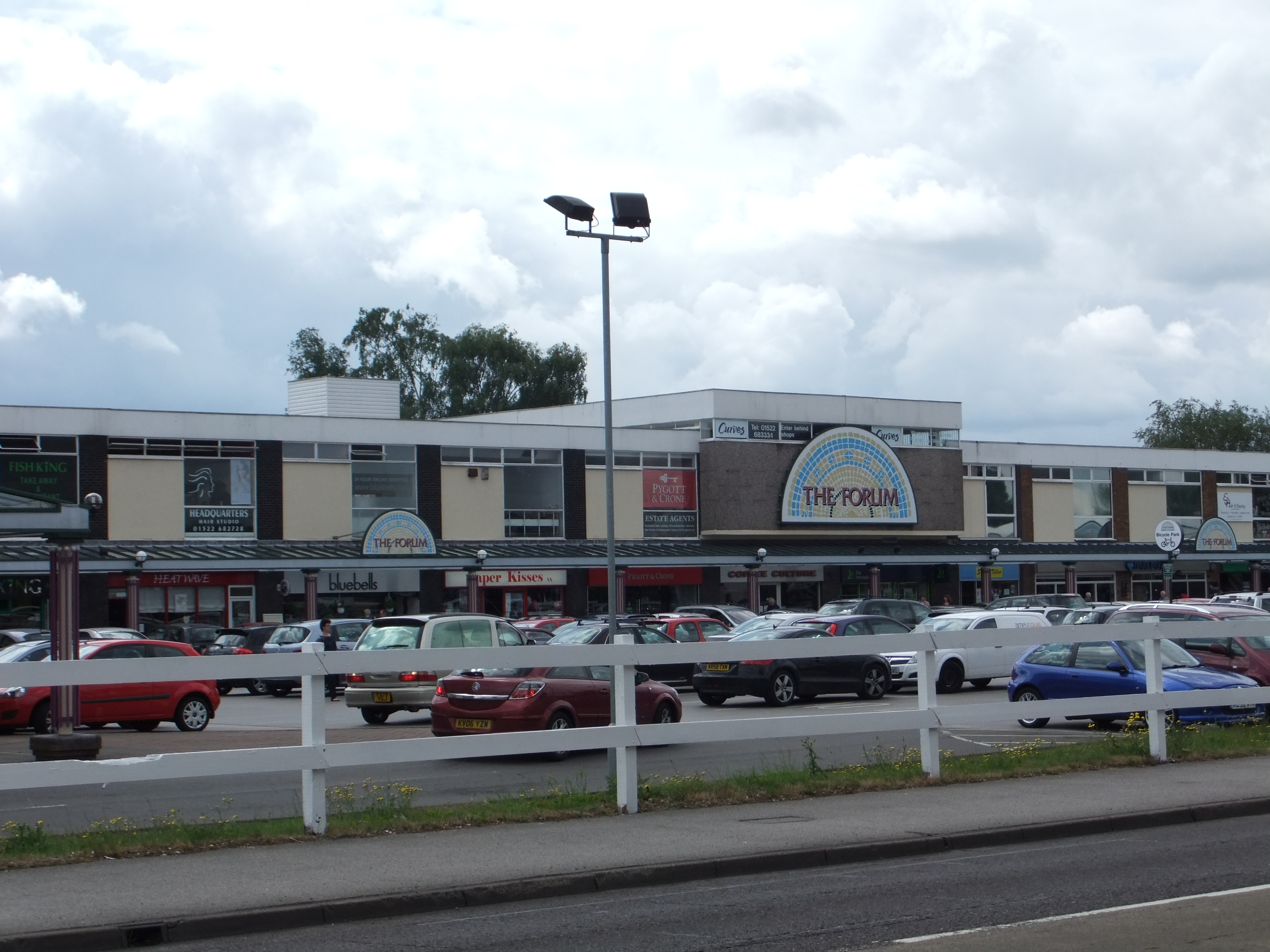
The Forum shopping area, North Hykeham

North Kesteven borders West Lindsey (along the Foss Dyke and the River Witham) and the city of Lincoln to the north, East Lindsey to the north-east (along the River Witham), Boston (borough) to the east, South Holland to the south-east, South Kesteven to the south, and the county of Nottinghamshire to the west.

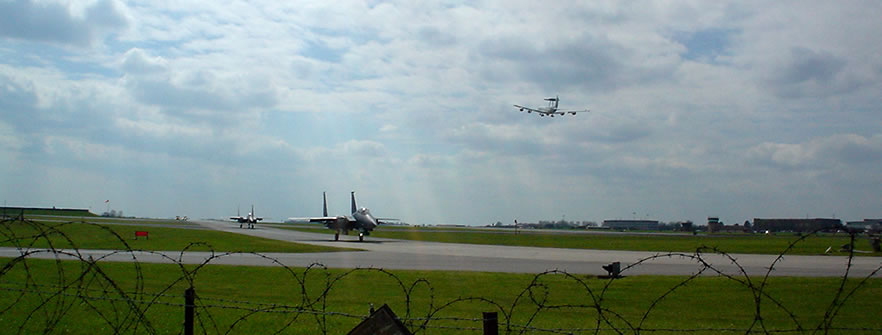
RAF Waddington is a main employer in the district

North Kesteven covers an area of 356 square miles (920 km^{2}), of which 94% is classified as green space, which includes agricultural land and open space.

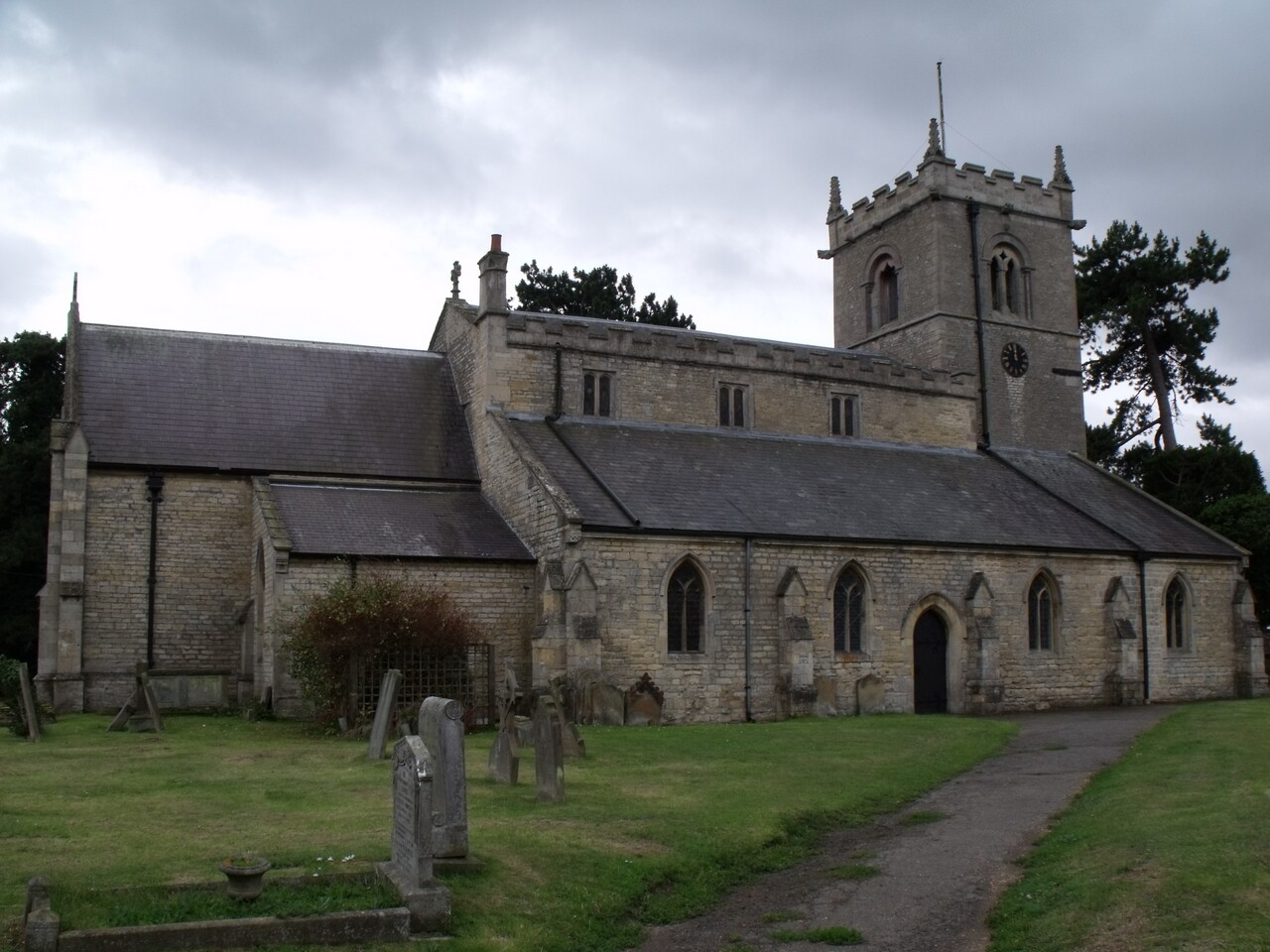
St Wilfred's Church, Metheringham

The district is characterised by small settlements and large areas of arable farmland. More than 80% of the population live in rural settlements or a market town. The two towns are Sleaford and North Hykeham, and the larger villages include Cranwell, Metheringham, Navenby, Ruskington and Waddington.

The district has two main RAF stations - RAF Cranwell (near Sleaford), and RAF Waddington (near Lincoln), both situated close to the A15, the main north–south road running through North Kesteven. The district is also home to RAF Digby, which lies between Sleaford and Metheringham. The former RAF Swinderby, which can be found adjacent to the A46 near the western edge of the district, closed in 1995.

== Demographics ==
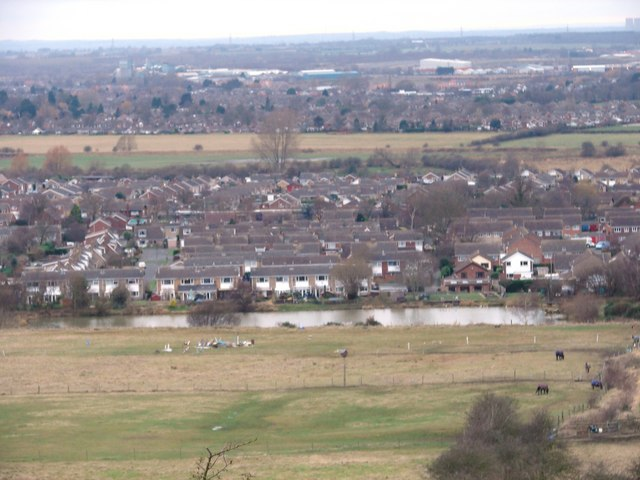
Skyline of North Hykeham which forms part of the wider Lincoln urban area

The predominantly rural nature of the district has encouraged people to move to the area to take advantage of its quality of life, low crime rates, relatively low house prices, good-quality education and local heritage. This is reflected in research, which has shown 90% of residents are satisfied with their local area as a place to live and 82% of residents feel their area is a place where people from different backgrounds can get on well together.

North Kesteven is mostly rural in character but there are urban areas around the towns of North Hykeham and Sleaford. Sleaford forms an urban area with the nearby villages of Greylees, Holdingham, Leasingham and Quarrington, North Hykeham and Waddington form part of an urban area with the city of Lincoln. Within the district, 40% of the population live in the "Lincoln Fringe", the area immediately surrounding Lincoln City. 72 parishes serve the district communities, comprising 58 parish councils, two town councils and 12 parish meetings.

The population of the district was 107,766 at the 2011 census.

== Education ==
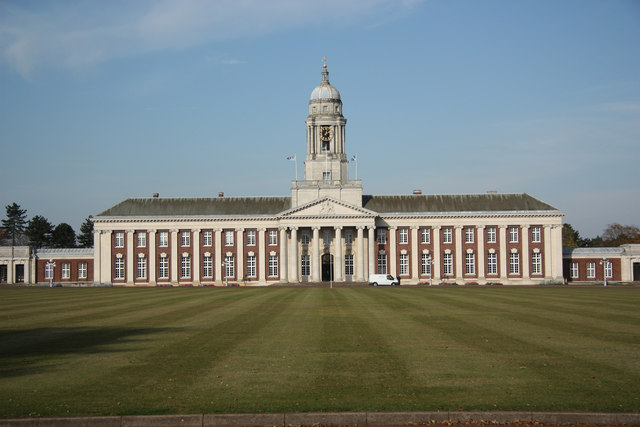
College Hall, RAF Cranwell near Cranwell

The district has comprehensive schools in North Hykeham, Branston and Welbourn. The area around Sleaford (including Ruskington) has selective schools. Other schools in the area include Kesteven and Sleaford High School and Branston Community College.

The district part funds The National Centre for Craft & Design, in the Hub building in Sleaford. Adjacent to it are annex buildings of Grantham College, funded by the East Midlands LSC.

== Media ==
In terms of television, East Lindsey is served by BBC Yorkshire and Lincolnshire and ITV Yorkshire broadcasting from the Belmont transmitter.

Radio stations for the area are BBC Radio Lincolnshire, Lincs FM, and Greatest Hits Radio Lincolnshire.

Lincolnshire Echo is the local newspaper.

== Towns and parishes ==
The entire district is divided into civil parishes. The parish councils for Sleaford and North Hykeham take the style "town council". Some of the smaller parishes share grouped parish councils or have parish meetings instead of parish councils.

== Arms ==
Coat of arms of North Kesteven

Crest
On a wreath Argent and Vert out of the battlements of a tower a crane wings expanded and inverted proper supporting with the interior foot a Maltese cross resting upon the battlements quarterly Gules and Argent.
Escutcheon
Per chevron Vert and Sable on a chevron Or between in chief two bars wavy the nether issuant Argent surmounted of a demi eagle issuant displayed wings inverted Or and in base an oak tree issuant fructed Or three estoiles Sable.
Motto
Rectam Viam Sequi (To Follow The Right Road)
