= Wimblington railway station =

Former railway station in Cambridgeshire, England

Coordinates: 52.5029°N 0.0817°E

Wimblington

General information
- Location: Chatteris, Fenland; England
- Grid reference: TL387860
- Platforms: 2

Other information
- Status: Disused

History
- Original company: Eastern Counties Railway
- Pre-grouping: Great Northern and Great Eastern Joint Railway
- Post-grouping: London and North Eastern Railway

Key dates
- 1 February 1848: Opened
- 28 December 1964: Closed to freight
- 6 March 1967: Closed to passengers
Location

Wimblington railway station was a station in the village of Wimblington, Cambridgeshire. It was closed in 1967 as part of the Beeching Axe. The station was demolished in the early 1970s and the site used for the construction of the new alignment of the A141 road.

Preceding station	Disused railways	Following station
Chatteris	GN and GE Joint Railway	March
