= Somersham railway station =

Former railway station in Cambridgeshire, England

Coordinates: 52.3811°N 0.006°E

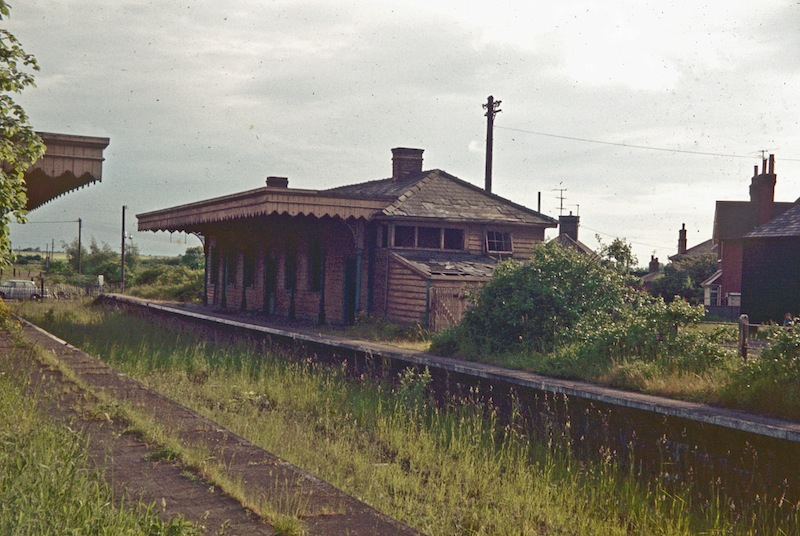
Somersham station in 1973

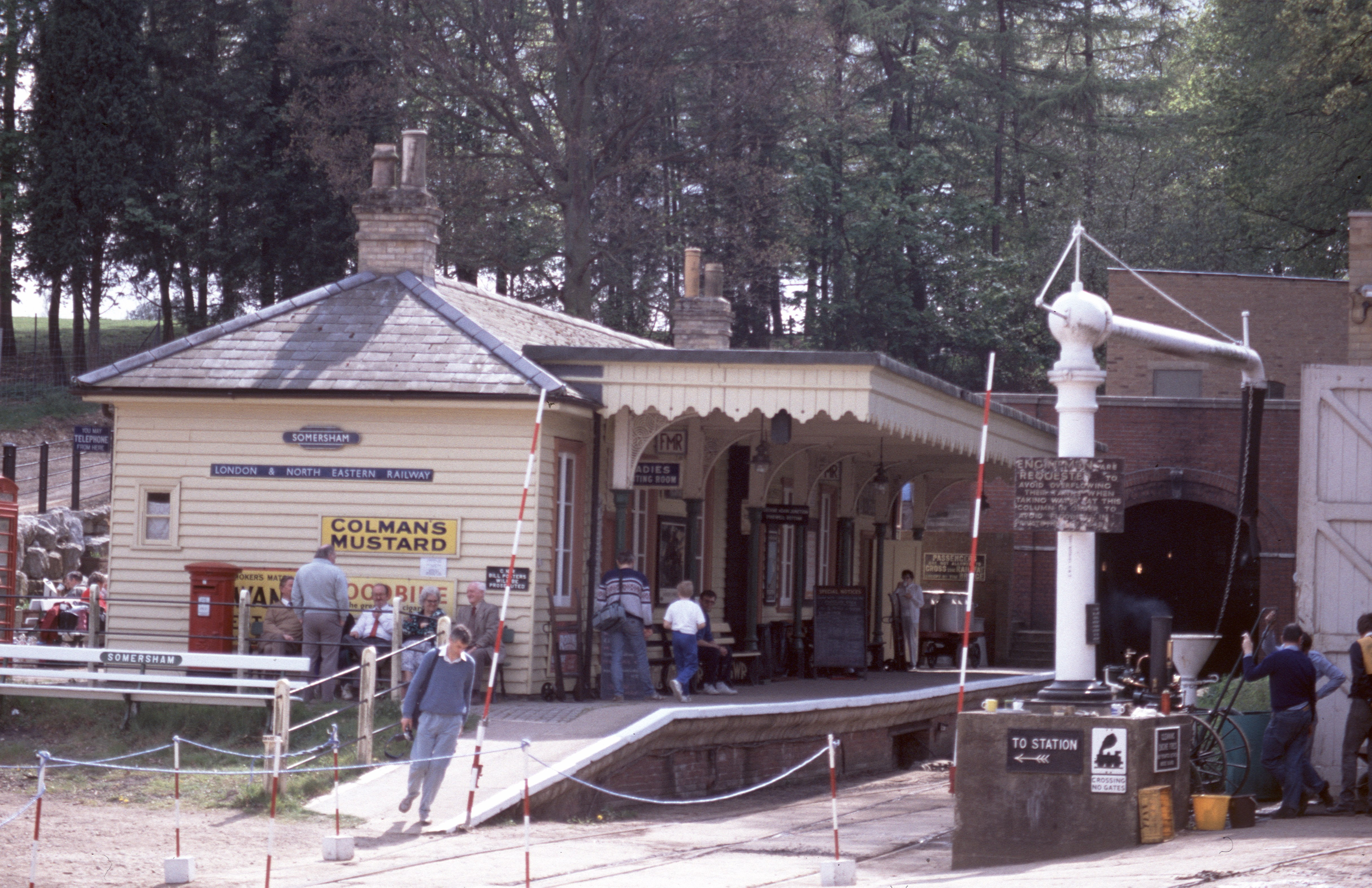
The station as rebuilt at the Fawley Hill Railway (1991)

Somersham railway station was a station in Somersham, Cambridgeshire on the Great Eastern Railway between March and St Ives. There was also a branch line that ran north-west from the station to Ramsey. It opened in 1848, but was closed on 6 March 1967.

The station was demolished and rebuilt at the private Fawley Hill Railway.

Preceding station	Disused railways	Following station
St Ives	Great Eastern Railway; March Line	Chatteris
St Ives	Great Eastern Railway; Ramsey Line	Warboys
