= Swaffham Prior =

Village in Cambridgeshire, England

Coordinates: 52.25°N 0.3°E

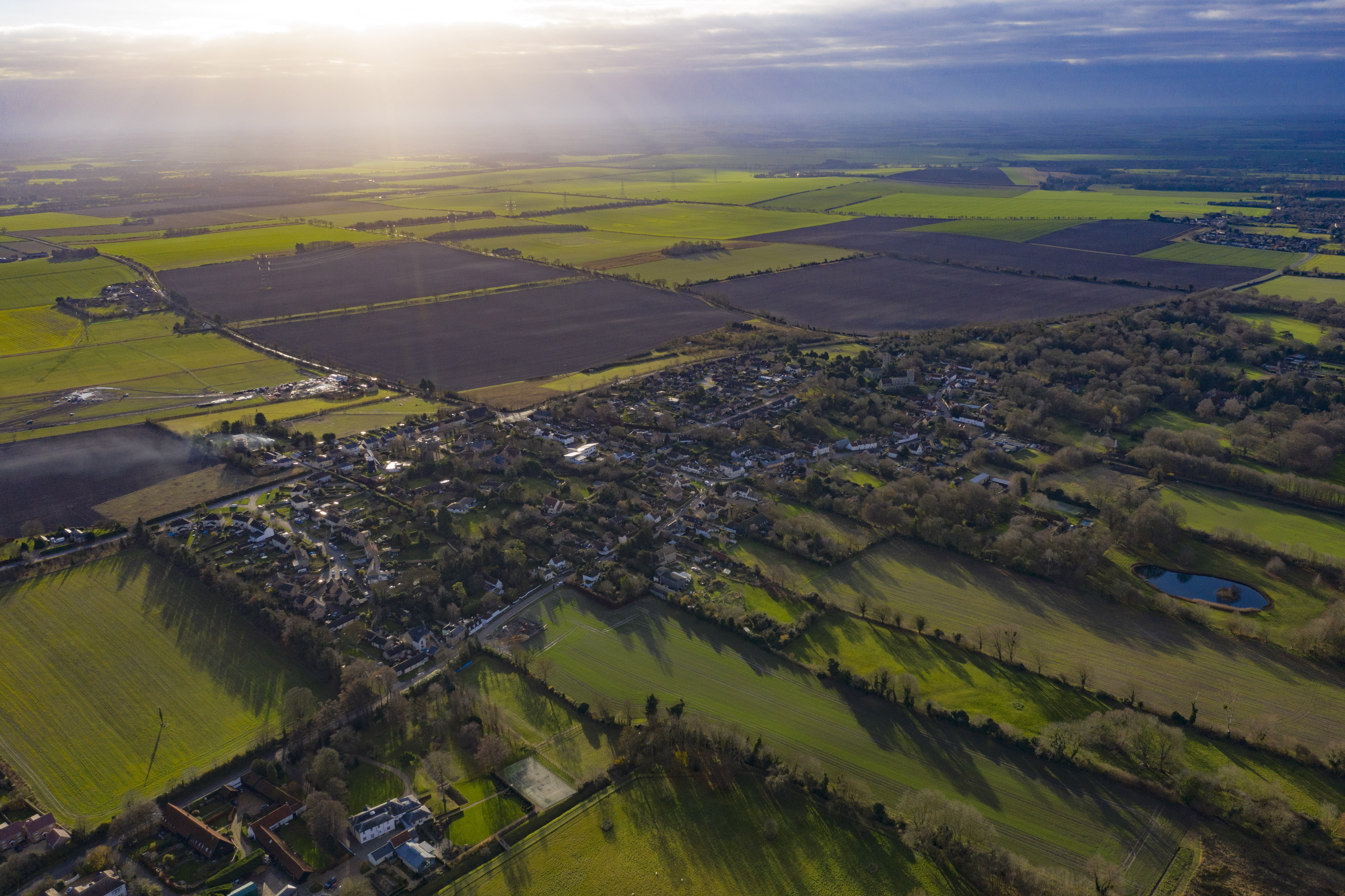

- Location within Cambridgeshire
- Area: 7.62 sq mi (19.7 km^{2})
- Population: 841 (2011Census)
  - Density: 110/sq mi (42/km^{2})
- OS grid reference: TL567639
- District: East Cambridgeshire
- Shire county: Cambridgeshire
- Region: East
- Country: England
- Sovereign state: United Kingdom
- Post town: CAMBRIDGE
- Postcode district: CB25
- Dialling code: 01638

Swaffham Prior is a small village in East Cambridgeshire, England.

Lying 5 miles west of Newmarket, and two miles south west of Burwell, the village is often paired with its neighbour Swaffham Bulbeck, and are collectively referred to as 'The Swaffhams'. Swaffham Prior was often known as Great Swaffham in past centuries. It should not be confused with the town of Swaffham in Norfolk.

The village is the first in the United Kingdom to use a rural heating network. The 1.7-megawatt system uses a combination of solar panels, heat pumps, underground storage and electric boilers. It delivers heat via a network of heavily insulated pipes under the streets. Homes that connect to it can tap into the heat via existing radiators and hot water appliances without changing equipment.

The installation of the £12 million system was made possible by a £3 million government grant and a local government loan along with resident payments via household bills spread over 60 years.

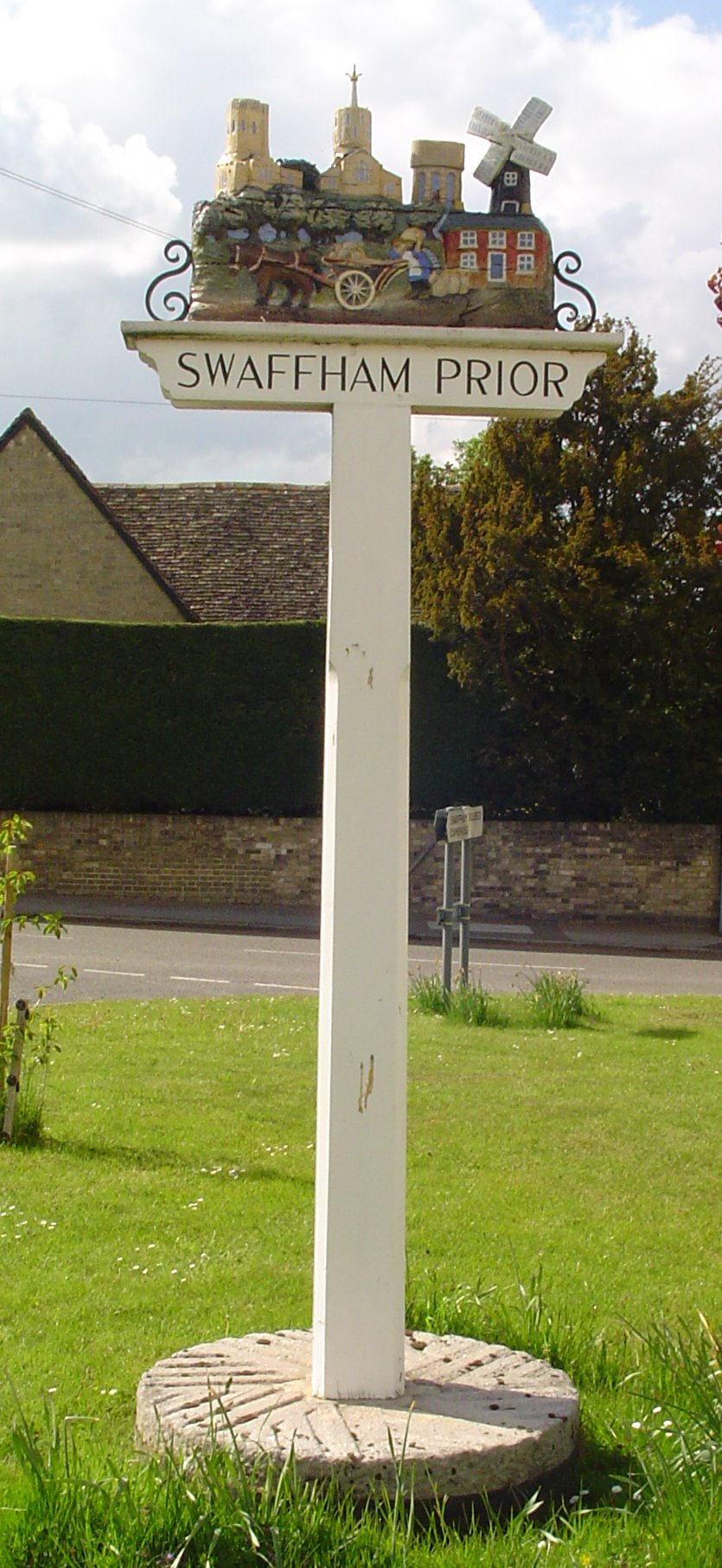
Village sign in Swaffham Prior

== Churches ==
The village is dominated by its twin churches that have served the parish since at least the 12th century – the Church of St Mary, and the Church of St Cyriac and St Julitta (dedicated to Saint Quiricus and Saint Julietta). In 1667 an act of parliament combined the churches under a single parish.

The church of St Mary was first built in Norman times, and over its history has at times been allowed to fall into ruin, only being fully restored at the start of the 20th century and serving as the sole parish church since 1903. It contains a rood screen, and has a series of stained glass windows showing scenes from World War I.

The original church of St Cyriac and St Julitta (Cyriac's mother) was built prior to 1200, and may possibly have existed before 1066. The present chapel is a plain Gothic-style church, consisting of a small chancel and nave with three small transeptal chapels. The tower was built in the 15th century and contains 6 bells. Having fallen into disuse, in 1878 an order was received that the church be demolished, but the order was never carried out. It now serves as a hall for exhibitions and other functions. Scottish poet Edwin Muir (1887–1959) is buried here.

John George Witt, the barrister and Q.C./K.C., was born in 1836 at Denny Abbey, Waterbeach, Cambridgeshire, and was a son of James Maling Witt (1799–1870), a prosperous farmer at Waterbeach and at Queens' College Farm, Swaffham Prior. J.G. Witt lived at Swaffham Prior during much of his youth and early manhood. He died in London in 1906. J.G. Witt's uncle, Dr. George Witt (1804–1869), was born at Swaffham Prior and died at 22 Princes' Terrace, Hyde Park, London. He was buried at Swaffham Prior.

== History and background ==
Just a mile or so north of Swaffham Prior is the Anglo-Saxon defensive earthwork known as the Devil's Dyke, blocking a land route through the fens.

Swaffham Prior is an old village, and is mentioned in the Domesday Book of 1086 as possibly 'Great Swaffham', with Swaffham Bulbeck being 'Little Swaffham'. There are houses in the village dating back several centuries, with the 17th century being most prominent. Though previously a trading village, today it could be described as a 'dormitory' village especially looking back on its busier past. Local facilities include a local primary school and The Red Lion pub. There's also a village hall, hosting village feasts, village fêtes, etc.

Swaffham Prior is also known for its two windmills (one still operating as a mill) which are symbols of the village, seen on the village sign on Cage Hill.

== Geography ==
Swaffham Prior chalk escarpment, observable only in a few places within the village is largely physically hidden from view. This local geological feature of the landscape is the chalk (local term clunch) escarpment of Swaffham Prior and it runs the full length of this East Cambridgeshire village dating back to Anglo-saxon times. The more modern sections of the village are built along the top of the escarpment with the older houses nestling below the cliff face backing on to the high street.

The chalk escarpment straddles two very different local eco-systems- the Cambridgeshire Fens to the west, where the land slopes down and the chalk heathland to the east, known locally as Swaffham Prior heath, part of the Greater Newmarket chalk heath, where the land height increases and plateaus into a larger area towards the east.

In a few places, the ridge of the escarpment is exposed, although usually within private property. A fraction of it can be seen from the high street, opposite the parish play area.

== Demography ==
Census counts for the village have been paired with Burwell and Reach at various times. These pairings due to boundary changes have been excluded from the table below.

Historical population of Swaffham Prior
Year	1801	1811	1821	1831	1841	1851	1861	1871	1881	1891	1901
Population					925	1027	992	1017	813		
Year	1911	1921	1931	1941	1951	1961	1971	1981	1991	2001	2011
Population						634	683	687	764	765	841
Census: 1801 – 2001 2011
