= Bricstan =

12th-century English monk

Bricstan was a 12th-century English trainee monk, miracle witness and Chatteris's first known parishioner. His story is chronicled by Bishop Hervey, the Bishop of Ely when Chatteris Abbey (which was dated around the year 980) was placed under the patronage of the Bishop of Ely by King Henry I in 1131.

== The legend ==
Bricstan was a free tenant living in Chatteris round about the year 1115. He wanted to become a monk, so he walked to the abbey at Ely, where the Chief Abbot accepted him for training as a monk. However, he was accused of theft, by a rogue who had a grievance against him. The accusations were accepted by the Chief Abbot, and Bricstan was sent to prison in London where he was kept in chains at all times.

The legend recounts that one night he had a vision of Saint Etheldreda coming towards him, and as if by a miracle, his chains fell from him and he was shackled no longer. When he awoke from his dream, he discovered that this was indeed true and he was free, of his chains at any rate. Queen Adeliza (the second wife of Henry the First) heard of the miracle, and she assured herself that he was no rogue or thief and issued a writ of pardon and declared him a free man.

== Historicity ==
The legal case was brought before the court in London is recorded in legal texts of that time The history of the county of Cambridge reports that "There is some support for this possibility in the tale of a miracle performed by St. Etheldreda in the reign of Henry I. She released from prison a certain Bricstan who, being accused of stealing the king's money, had been condemned”

Bricstan's name is currently used as the name of the new Parish Church hall in Chatteris. The new "Bricstan Hall", part funded by SureStart is now a well used resource for many groups in the town.
