= Chatteris =

Market town in Cambridgeshire, England

Coordinates: 52.456°N 0.055°E

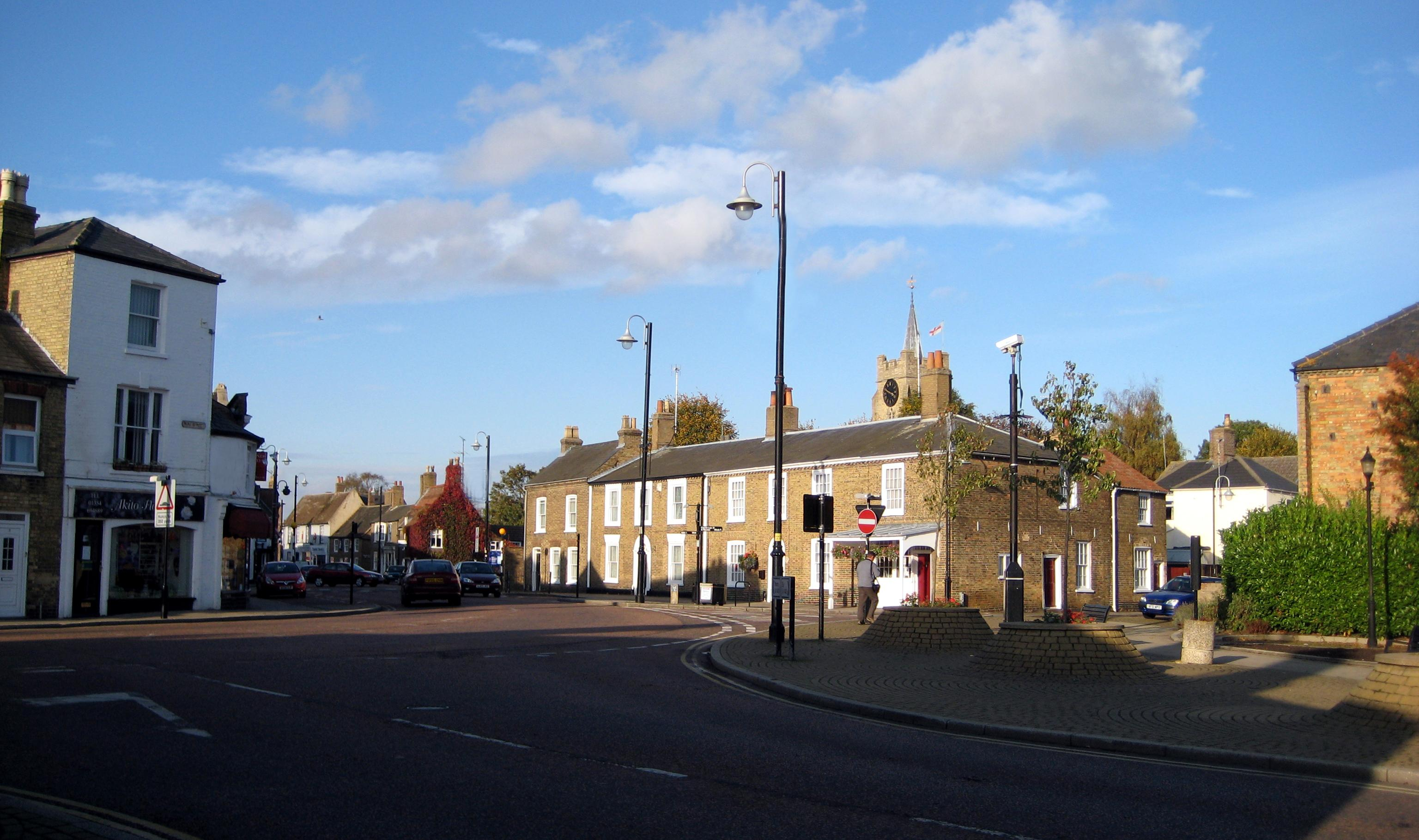
- Market Hill, Chatteris

- Location within Cambridgeshire
- Population: 11,011 (2021)
- OS grid reference: TL396862
  - London: 65 mi (105 km) S
- Civil parish: Chatteris
- District: Fenland
- Shire county: Cambridgeshire
- Region: East
- Country: England
- Sovereign state: United Kingdom
- Post town: CHATTERIS
- Postcode district: PE16
- Dialling code: 01354
- Police: Cambridgeshire
- Fire: Cambridgeshire
- Ambulance: East of England
- UK Parliament: North East Cambridgeshire

Chatteris (/ˈtʃætərɪs/) is a market town and civil parish in the Fenland district of Cambridgeshire, England, situated in the Fens between Huntingdon, March and Ely. The town is in the North East Cambridgeshire parliamentary constituency.

The parish of Chatteris is large, covering 6,099 hectares, and for much of its history was a raised island in the low-lying wetland of the Fens. Mentioned in the Domesday Book of 1086, the town has evidence of settlement from the Neolithic period. After several fires in the 18th and 19th centuries, the majority of the town's housing dates from the late Victorian period onwards, with the tower of the parish church the only medieval building remaining.

Following the draining of the Fens, beginning in the 17th century and completed in the 19th century, the town's economy has been based on agriculture and related industry. Due to its proximity to Cambridge, Huntingdon and Peterborough, the town has emerged as a commuter town. The town had a population of 11,011 at the time of the United Kingdom Census 2021.

== Toponymy ==
The origin of the name Chatteris is uncertain. The name is first attested in a charter of 974 (in a fourteenth-century copy), as Cæateric and in the Domesday Book of 1086 as Catriz, Cietriz, Cetriz and Cateriz. The Cambridge Dictionary of English Place-Names derives the name from a putatively Old English personal name Ceatta and a word *ric ("ridge"), thus meaning "Ceatta's ridge". Others have suggested, however, that the name derives from a Common Brittonic word corresponding to modern Welsh coed ("wood") compounded with Common Brittonic *rïcc ("groove"), though Richard Coates and Andrew Breeze characterise this interpretation as "frankly [...] most uncertain"). Others again suggest that name probably derives from the Celtic Cedrid – Ced meaning a wood and Rid, a ford, although it may also derive from "cader", meaning hill fort, suggesting a similar site to the nearby Stonea Camp.

== History ==
=== Prehistory and early history ===
Archaeological evidence has been found of Neolithic, Bronze Age and Iron Age settlements in the area, and Chatteris possesses what has been interpreted as the only upstanding Neolithic boundaries in Fenland. Saxon evidence is less well preserved, although in 679, Hunna, the chaplain to Æthelthryth of Ely built a hermitage on Honey Hill. More apocryphally, Chatteris is reputed to have been the last refuge of Boudica as she fled from the Romans.

=== Medieval period ===
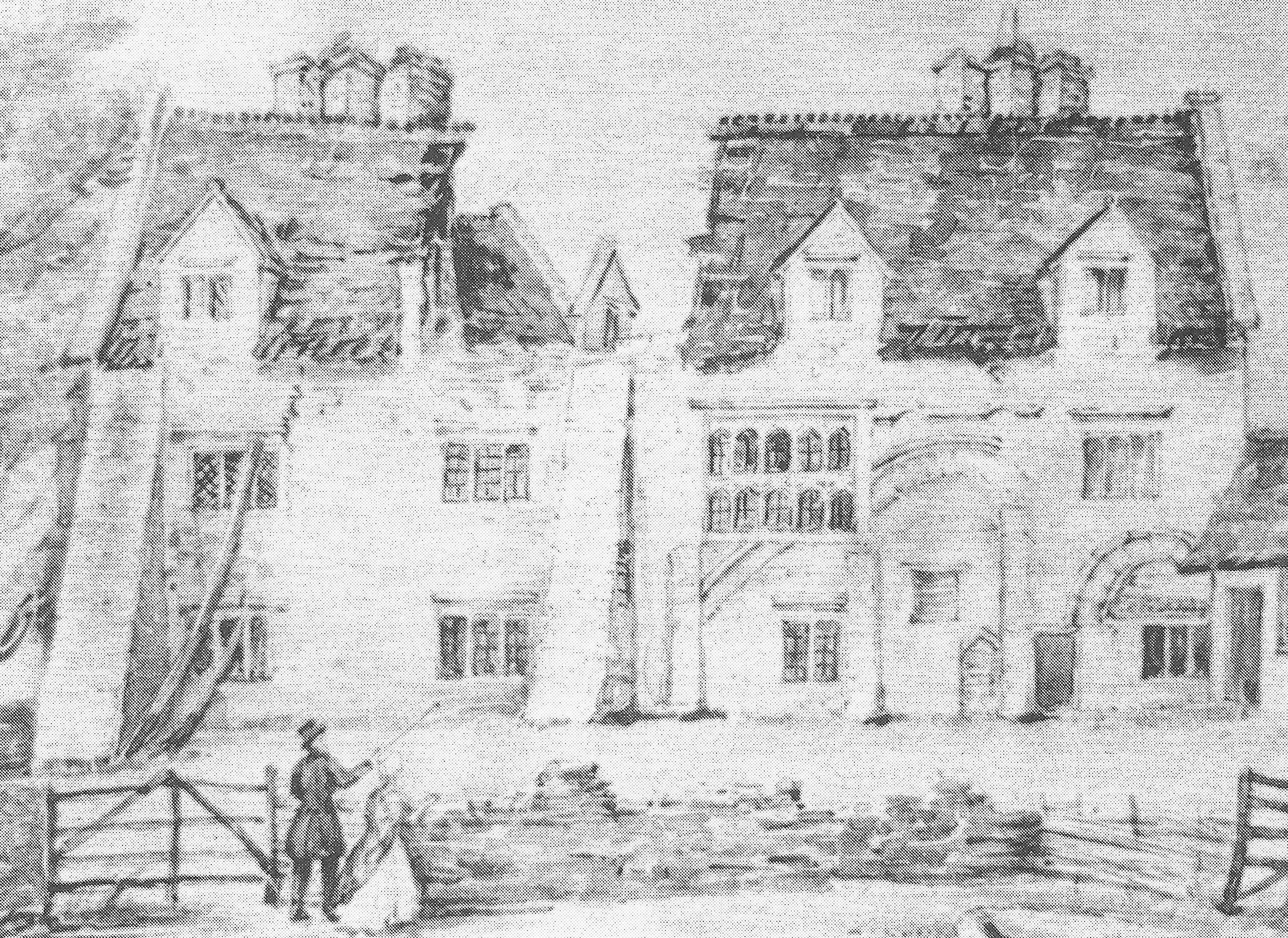
A privately owned 1847 watercolour of Park House before its demolition. Elements of the dissolved Chatteris Abbey can be seen in the walls, including Norman arches at right.

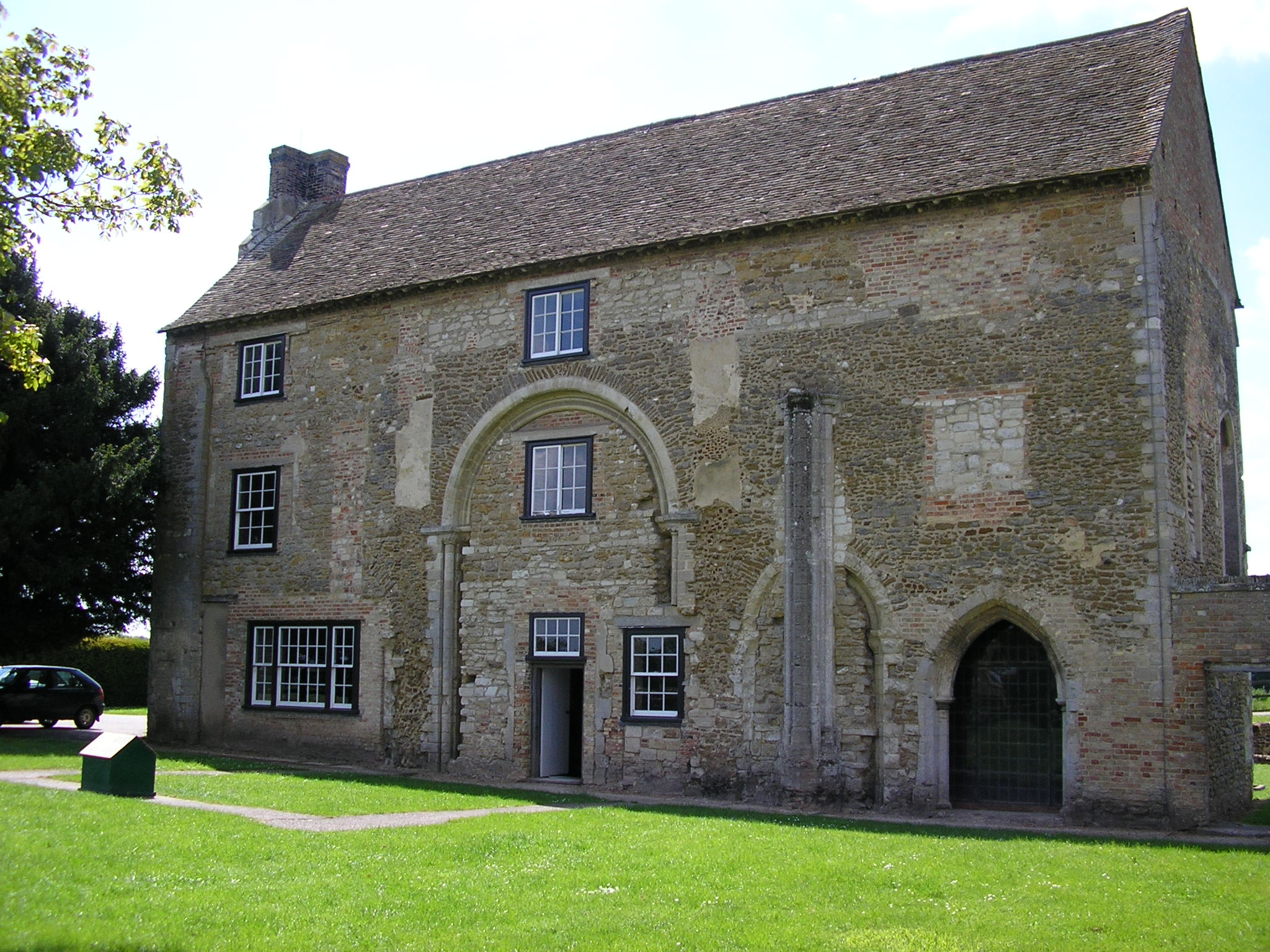
Extant remains of Denny Abbey between Ely and Cambridge, showing similar remnants of adjoining larger and smaller Norman arches, side by side

The miraculous story of the first known parishioner of the town, Bricstan, is documented in the Historia Ecclesiastica by the Chronicler Orderic Vitalis (1075 – c.1142). According to the legend, Bricstan was a pious free tenant from the town who had joined the monastery at Ely Cathedral in 1115 to begin training as a monk. However, he was accused of theft and imprisoned in London. The legend recounts that one night he had a vision of Saint Etheldreda coming towards him, and as if by a miracle, his heavy chains fell from him and he was shackled no longer. When he awoke from his dream, he discovered that this was indeed true and he was free of his chains. The wife of Henry I, Matilda of Scotland, heard of the miracle, and she assured herself that he was no rogue or thief, issued a writ of pardon and declared him a free man.

During the Medieval period, the town was dominated by Chatteris Abbey, a small Benedictine nunnery dedicated to St Mary, built in 980 by Eadnoth the Younger for Aelfwyn or Alfwen the niece of King Edgar and one of only eight nunneries mentioned in the Domesday Book. The first abbess of Chatteris was Eadnoth's sister, Aelfwyn. Throughout its existence, the abbey was comparatively poor compared to other foundations, due to a lack of royal patronage and a consequent lack of tithe estates. As a result, the abbey survived the first wave of closures during the Dissolution of the Monasteries, but was surrendered to the king's commissioners in 1538, by which time there were eleven nuns in residence.

At this date fourteen local families still used the abbey church as parochial but this, unusually, did not save it from demolition, the parishioners being transferred to nearby St Peter and St Paul's Church in the area. It has been conjectured that due to the short space between them, the parish church may have been the abbey church, although Claire Breay's Cartulary of Chatteris Abbey discounts this idea, citing that historical documentation clearly defines two separate churches. A range of the cloister buildings survived as part of a mansion known as Park House. This was demolished in 1847 and the site has now completely vanished beneath streets and housing, although the "Park Streets" of Chatteris mark the boundary of its walls and several buildings contain stone originating from the abbey. A large portion of the town was destroyed by a great fire in 1310, which destroyed the nunnery and a large portion of the church, leaving only sections of the base of the tower.

=== Early modern and contemporary ===
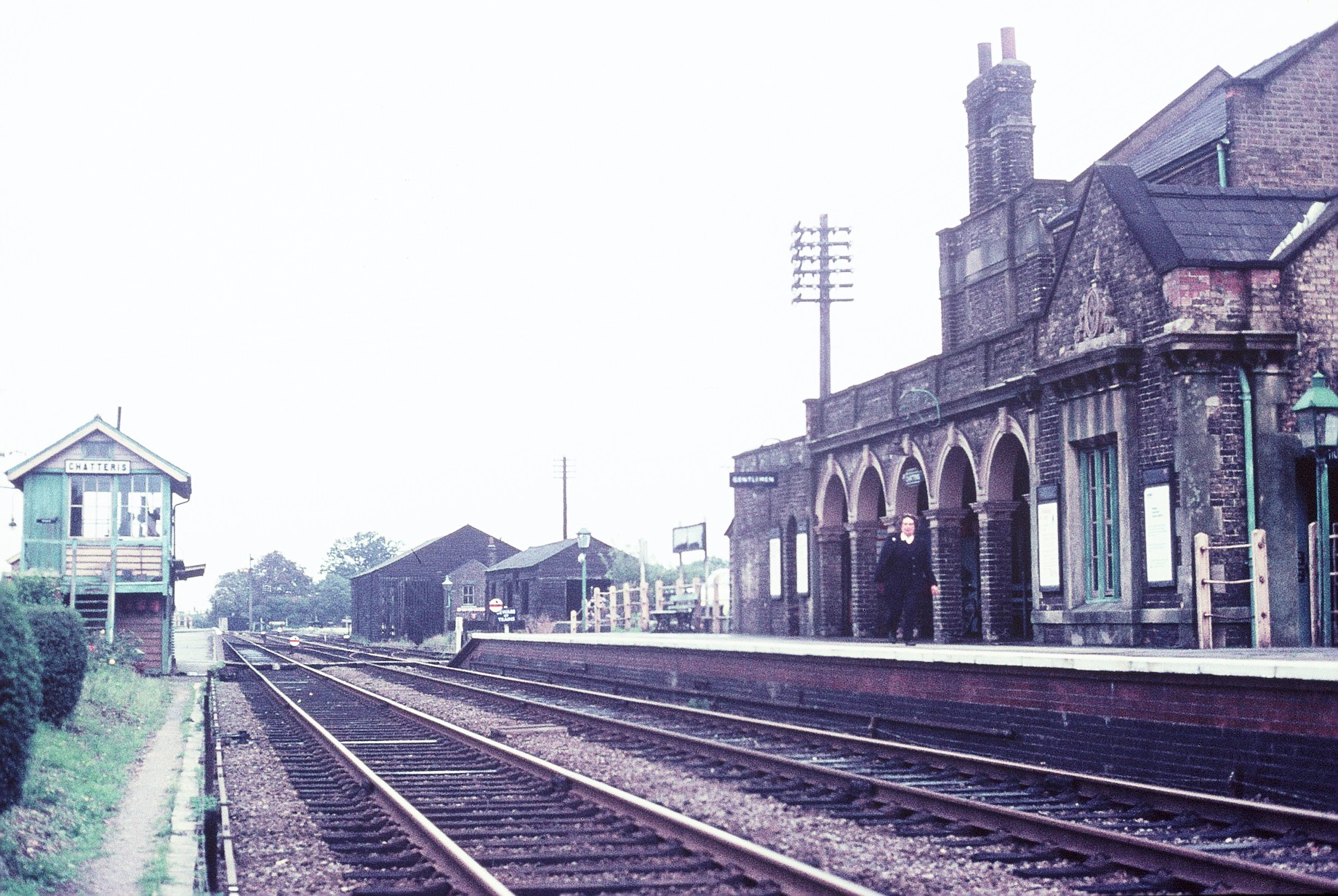
Chatteris railway station before closure in 1967

Later fires in 1706 and 1864 destroyed most medieval and Georgian architecture, and a large proportion of the town's listed buildings date from the Victorian period onwards. However, many of the pasture fields on the outskirts of the town have evidence of ridge and furrow farming practices, although these are under threat by current building proposals.

To the north of the town runs the Forty Foot Drain, a large river also called Vermuyden's Drain, after the Dutch engineer whose name is associated with the fen drainage works of the middle of the 17th century. Several of the older buildings of the town show evidence of the Dutch architectural style.

Chatteris is a market town and has possessed this designation since 1834, although an earlier market existed in the town, which was discontinued due to poor roads in 1808. A small market is still held every Friday.

Following the Beeching Axe, Chatteris railway station, formerly on the St Ives extension of the Great Eastern Railway, was closed in March 1967. The station buildings no longer exist.

== Geography ==
Chatteris is situated between Huntingdon, St Ives, Peterborough, March and Ely, in the middle of the Fens—the lowest-lying area in the United Kingdom—with most of the land surrounding the town being below sea level, although the highest point in the Fens (36 feet above sea level) is within Chatteris's parish boundaries. The peaty land surrounding the town is largely used for agriculture, drained by numerous ditches and dykes, and there are two large drainage rivers near the town – the Forty Foot Drain, also known as Vermuyden's Drain, and the Sixteen Foot Drain.

Chatteris is a key turning point on the A141 road (known as the Isle of Ely way) and the starting point of the A142 road to Ely and Suffolk (known as Ireton's Way). The town also has important links to Cambridge and the A14 via the B1050 to Bar Hill. The town centre traffic was bypassed in 1986, with the disused route of the former St Ives extension of the Great Eastern Railway being used to build the A141 to March and Guyhirn.

=== Climate ===
There are no Met Office recording stations in the Fens, but an indication of rainfall and temperature of the county town Cambridge on the edge of the Fens shows that rainfall is below the national average, and in a wider study of East Anglia, the region had temperatures comparable with London, the warmest part of the UK.

Climate data for Cambridge University Botanic Garden, (Note: Weather station is located 0.8 miles (1.3 km) from the Cambridge city centre.) elevation: 13 m (43 ft), 1991–2020 normals, extremes 1914–present
Month	Jan	Feb	Mar	Apr	May	Jun	Jul	Aug	Sep	Oct	Nov	Dec	Year
Record high °C (°F)	15.7 (60.3)	18.8 (65.8)	23.9 (75.0)	27.9 (82.2)	34.0 (93.2)	35.0 (95.0)	39.9 (103.8)	36.9 (98.4)	33.9 (93.0)	29.0 (84.2)	21.1 (70.0)	16.0 (60.8)	39.9 (103.8)
Mean daily maximum °C (°F)	7.8 (46.0)	8.6 (47.5)	11.5 (52.7)	14.6 (58.3)	18.0 (64.4)	20.8 (69.4)	23.3 (73.9)	22.9 (73.2)	19.9 (67.8)	15.3 (59.5)	10.9 (51.6)	8.1 (46.6)	15.1 (59.2)
Daily mean °C (°F)	4.8 (40.6)	5.2 (41.4)	7.3 (45.1)	9.7 (49.5)	12.8 (55.0)	15.6 (60.1)	17.9 (64.2)	17.7 (63.9)	15.0 (59.0)	11.4 (52.5)	7.5 (45.5)	5.0 (41.0)	10.8 (51.4)
Mean daily minimum °C (°F)	1.7 (35.1)	1.7 (35.1)	3.1 (37.6)	4.7 (40.5)	7.5 (45.5)	10.5 (50.9)	12.6 (54.7)	12.5 (54.5)	10.2 (50.4)	7.4 (45.3)	4.2 (39.6)	1.9 (35.4)	6.5 (43.7)
Record low °C (°F)	−16.1 (3.0)	−17.2 (1.0)	−11.7 (10.9)	−6.1 (21.0)	−4.4 (24.1)	−0.6 (30.9)	2.2 (36.0)	3.3 (37.9)	−2.2 (28.0)	−6.5 (20.3)	−13.3 (8.1)	−15.6 (3.9)	−17.2 (1.0)
Average precipitation mm (inches)	47.2 (1.86)	35.9 (1.41)	32.2 (1.27)	36.2 (1.43)	43.9 (1.73)	52.3 (2.06)	53.2 (2.09)	57.6 (2.27)	49.3 (1.94)	56.5 (2.22)	54.4 (2.14)	49.8 (1.96)	568.4 (22.38)
Average precipitation days (≥ 1.0 mm)	10.7	8.9	8.1	7.9	7.4	8.7	8.4	8.7	8.1	9.5	10.5	10.3	107.3
Average relative humidity (%)	86.0	82.5	78.6	74.6	74.8	73.9	72.5	73.7	77.5	83.3	87.0	87.8	79.4
Source 1: ECA&D
Source 2: Weather.Directory

Climate data for Cambridge (NIAB) (Note: Weather station is located 3 miles (4.8 km) from the Cambridge city centre.), elevation: 26 m (85 ft), 1991–2020 normals, extremes 1959–present
Month	Jan	Feb	Mar	Apr	May	Jun	Jul	Aug	Sep	Oct	Nov	Dec	Year
Record high °C (°F)	15.4 (59.7)	18.3 (64.9)	23.9 (75.0)	26.9 (80.4)	33.4 (92.1)	35.8 (96.4)	39.9 (103.8)	36.1 (97.0)	32.0 (89.6)	29.3 (84.7)	18.3 (64.9)	16.1 (61.0)	39.9 (103.8)
Mean daily maximum °C (°F)	7.7 (45.9)	8.3 (46.9)	11.0 (51.8)	14.1 (57.4)	17.4 (63.3)	20.4 (68.7)	23.1 (73.6)	22.9 (73.2)	19.6 (67.3)	15.1 (59.2)	10.7 (51.3)	8.0 (46.4)	14.9 (58.8)
Daily mean °C (°F)	4.8 (40.6)	5.0 (41.0)	7.0 (44.6)	9.4 (48.9)	12.4 (54.3)	15.4 (59.7)	17.8 (64.0)	17.7 (63.9)	15.0 (59.0)	11.5 (52.7)	7.6 (45.7)	5.1 (41.2)	10.7 (51.3)
Mean daily minimum °C (°F)	1.9 (35.4)	1.8 (35.2)	3.1 (37.6)	4.6 (40.3)	7.4 (45.3)	10.5 (50.9)	12.6 (54.7)	12.6 (54.7)	10.5 (50.9)	7.9 (46.2)	4.5 (40.1)	2.2 (36.0)	6.7 (44.1)
Record low °C (°F)	−16.0 (3.2)	−15.3 (4.5)	−9.4 (15.1)	−5.9 (21.4)	−1.8 (28.8)	0.0 (32.0)	4.8 (40.6)	3.3 (37.9)	−0.6 (30.9)	−5.4 (22.3)	−8.9 (16.0)	−12.5 (9.5)	−16.0 (3.2)
Average precipitation mm (inches)	48.6 (1.91)	35.7 (1.41)	32.9 (1.30)	37.6 (1.48)	43.2 (1.70)	49.1 (1.93)	48.3 (1.90)	55.9 (2.20)	47.6 (1.87)	58.7 (2.31)	52.6 (2.07)	49.2 (1.94)	559.4 (22.02)
Average precipitation days (≥ 1.0 mm)	10.4	8.7	8.1	8.0	7.3	8.7	8.4	9.0	8.0	9.6	10.4	10.5	107.2
Mean monthly sunshine hours	57.2	77.8	118.4	157.2	182.7	182.5	190.0	181.3	144.0	110.3	67.6	53.7	1,522.7
Source 1: Met Office
Source 2: Starlings Roost Weather

== Governance ==
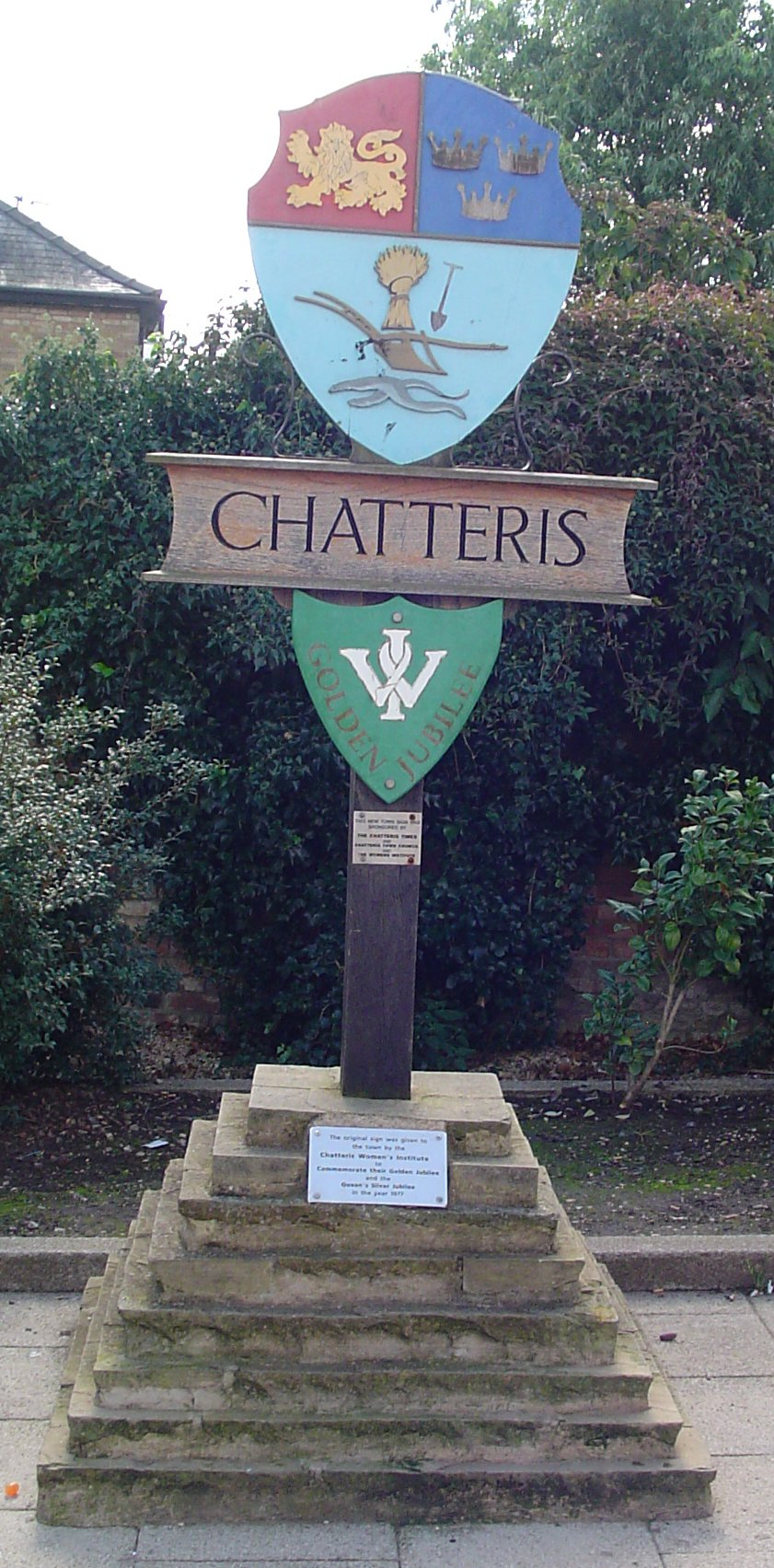
Town sign in Chatteris

There are three tiers of local government covering Chatteris, at civil parish (town), district, and county level: Chatteris Town Council, Fenland District Council, and Cambridgeshire County Council. The district and county councils are also members of the Cambridgeshire and Peterborough Combined Authority, led by the directly elected Mayor of Cambridgeshire and Peterborough. The town council is based at 14 Church Lane.

The town is part of the North East Cambridgeshire parliamentary seat, whose Member of Parliament is currently Steve Barclay, a Conservative.

=== Administrative history ===
Chatteris was an ancient parish in the North Witchford hundred of Cambridgeshire. It was administered by its vestry and manorial courts until 1873, when the parish was made a local government district, with an elected local board. Such local government districts were reconstituted as urban districts under the Local Government Act 1894.

The North Witchford hundred formed part of the Isle of Ely, which was historically a liberty under the secular jurisdiction of the Bishop of Ely. The bishop's jurisdiction was ended by the Liberty of Ely Act 1837 (7 Will. 4 & 1 Vict. c. 53). Between 1889 and 1965, the Isle of Ely was an administrative county with its own county council, whilst also forming part of the wider geographical county of Cambridgeshire. Between 1965 and 1974, the administrative county covering Chatteris was called Cambridgeshire and Isle of Ely.

Chatteris Urban District was abolished in 1974 under the Local Government Act 1972. District-level functions passed to the new Fenland District Council. A successor parish called Chatteris was created covering the area of the abolished urban district, with its parish council taking the name Chatteris Town Council.

=== Policing ===
Under the Police Act 1964 and local government reform in 1974, the Isle of Ely Constabulary became part of the Mid-Anglia Constabulary until the present Cambridgeshire Constabulary was formed in 1974. A small police station is situated in East Park Street, but it is no longer open to the public.

== Economy ==
=== Overview ===
Chatteris is sited in particularly fertile agricultural land, and as such, the town's local economy is largely based on this industry. Alan Bartlett and Sons Ltd, a major British grower and packer of root vegetables has a large facility in the town with over 2,500 hectares under cultivation, much of it growing parsnips and the Chantenay and Bushytops carrot. The company is a demerger of Albert Bartlett & Sons, which are now based in Scotland. Rustler Produce Ltd, also based in Chatteris, is another major player in this industry, and a number of smaller vegetable producers and processors operate in the Chatteris area.

Another major employer in the town is Metalcraft (Stainless Metalcraft (Chatteris) Ltd). The company was established in the town in the late 19th century and over the years has manufactured diamond mining equipment and overhead cranes. The company is now part of the Avingtrans Group and specialises in creating engineered products for the oil, gas, nuclear and medical industries.

An Aldi supermarket located on Bridge Street opened in 2016. It was formerly a large Co-op which opened in 1990, trading under a variety of brandnames until its closure in 2014.

Another supermarket constructed on the A141 Fenland Way became the first of Tesco's discount Jack's-branded stores in the UK and hosted the press launch on 19 September 2018, opening to the public the following day. It is located within a larger building intended as a Tesco supermarket, constructed at a cost of £22 million but left mothballed following the company's decision to halt the opening of 49 out-of-town supermarkets following poor financial results in October 2014. In 2022 Jack's closed and converted to a Tesco store as originally intended. The other half opened as a Poundstretcher in 2018 which closed in 2023 and re-opened as a B&M store. Alongside the two big stores is a smaller Screwfix store opened in 2020.

The traditional town centre stretches from Park Street through Market Hill to the High Street and generally features more specialist non-branch shops. The town centre has a post office but no banks following the closure of Barclays in 2019. The Petrou Brothers fish and chip shop in West Park Street won the 2006 National Fish and Chip Shop of the Year competition; the owners were presented with the award by chef Ainsley Harriott.

There are a number of small restaurants, pubs, tea shops and several members' clubs.

Economic activity (16–74 population)
Economic status	Count 2001	Percentage 2001	Count 2011	Percentage 2011
Employed	3,588	57.2%	5,040	66.4%
Self-employed	562	9.0%	701	9.2%
Working/full-time students	82	1.3%	162	2.1%
Unemployed	150	2.4%	276	3.6%
Retired	912	14.5%	1,161	15.3%
Students	148	2.4%	89	1.2%
Looking after home/family	395	6.3%	335	4.4%
Sick/disabled	297	4.7%	263	3.5%
Other	139	2.2%	107	1.4%

=== Transport ===
Chatteris was well served by local bus routes, with regular buses to the nearby towns of March, St Ives, Ely and the city of Cambridge. There are also occasional services to Huntingdon and Peterborough. However the decline in bus usage associated with Covid and more generally has led to the potential ending of all services.

The nearest railway stations are in March and Manea.

== Demographics ==
The United Kingdom Census 2011 found the population of Chatteris to be 10,453. This was an increase of 1163 since 2001 which recorded 8,820 people living in 3,809 households, with the average number of people per dwelling 2.31. The 2001 census found that 98.9% of the population of the town were of the white ethnic group. The parish of Chatteris is large, covering 6,099 hectares, equalling an average population density of 1.45, although most of the dwellings are concentrated in a smaller area, the outskirts of the town consisting of farmland. 99.6% of residents lived in households, the remaining 0.4% lived in communal establishments.

=== Ethnic groups ===
The majority of the population in Chatteris state their ethnic group as "White". At 97.2% this is higher than the average of 94.1 for England and Wales. Since 2011 diversity in Chatteris has increased slightly and all ethnic groups have increased in size except for "Other" but this is likely due to the addition of "Mixed" as an option in the 2011 census.

Ethnic groups in Chatteris
Ethnic croup	Count 2001	Percentage 2001	Count 2011	Percentage 2011
White	8,715	98.9%	10,165	97.2%
Mixed/multiple ethnic groups	NA	NA	107	1.0%
Asian/Asian British	27	0.3%	109	1.0%
Black/African/Caribbean/Black British	9	0.1%	60	0.6%
Other ethnic group	26	0.3%	12	0.1%

=== Languages ===
In the 2011 Census 2.3% of households in Chatteris reported to have no people in household who have English as a main language.

=== Religion ===
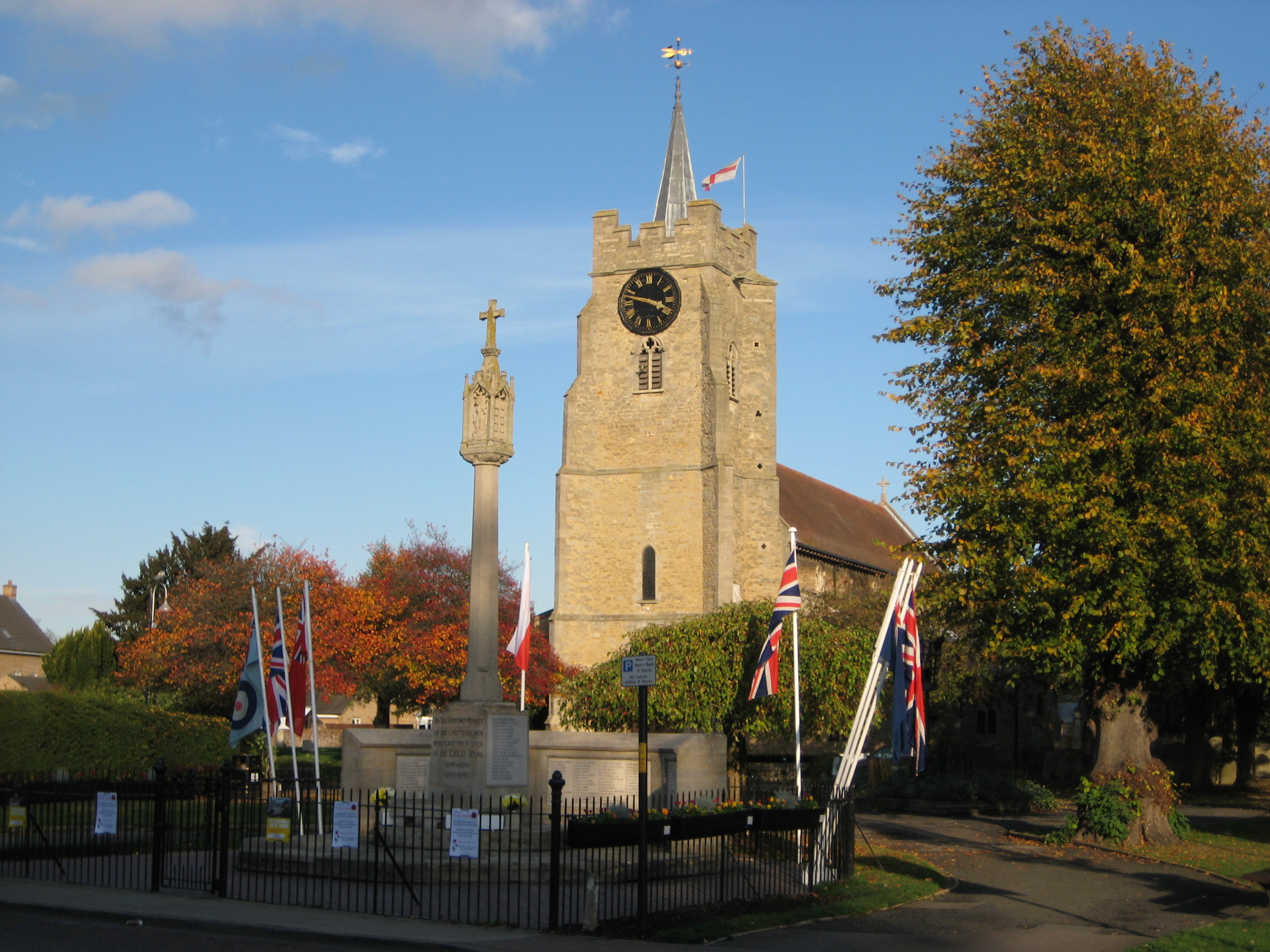
The Parish Church of St Peter & St Paul

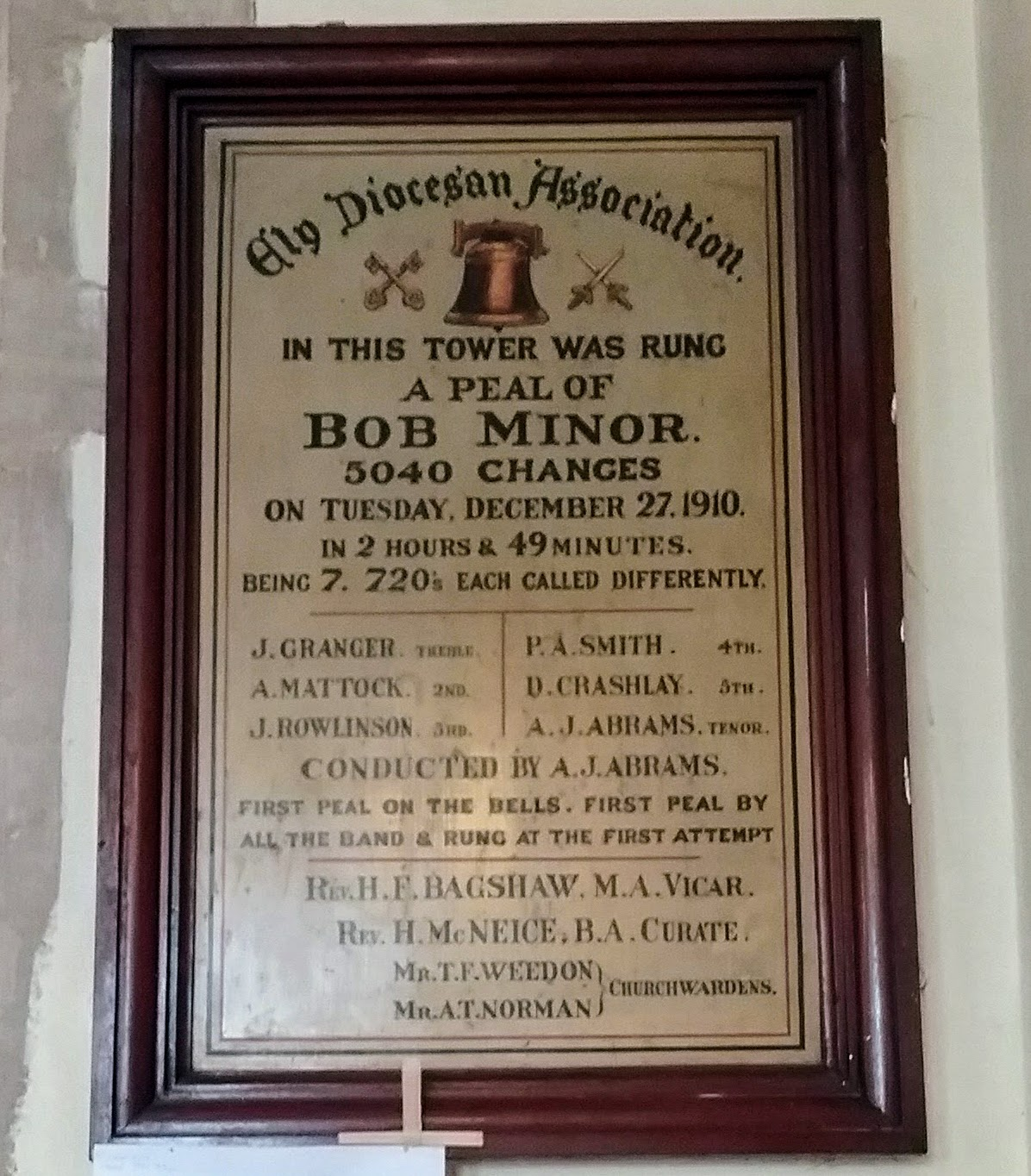
Plaque commemorating the ringing of a Bob Minor in 1910 at St Peter and St Paul Church, Chatteris

Christianity is the majority religion in Chatteris. From 2001 to 2011 it fell from 74.8% to 62.6%, partly due to a decrease in numbers but mostly due to population growth of which the majority have no religion. Despite the reduction in numbers the Christian population of Chatteris is above the average for England and Wales at 59.3%.

Religion in Chatteris
Religion	Count 2001	Percentage 2001	Count 2011	Percentage 2011
Christian	6,596	74.8%	6,429	62.6%
No religion	NA	NA	3,142	30.1%
Hindu	NA	NA	23	0.2%
Muslim	NA	NA	22	0.2%
Buddhist	NA	NA	19	0.2%
Sikh	NA	NA	14	0.1%
Jewish	NA	NA	2	0.0%
Other religion	54	0.6%	33	0.3%
Not stated	NA	NA	769	7.4%
No religion/Religion not stated	2,163	24.5%	NA	NA

The parish church of St Peter & St Paul is situated in the centre of the town. A church has been on the site since at least 1162, although the current tower dates from 1352. The building had fallen into disrepair during the 19th century, and the majority of the building is the result of an intensive restoration in 1910. This included restoring a pitched roof and adding new aisles, although the nave arches are original. The church of St Peter & St Paul is a Grade I listed building. In 1935, a new two-manual Harrison & Harrison organ was installed, a fine example of a pneumatic action instrument. Recent years have seen the construction of several new facilities, such as the Bricstan room extension. The church lists itself as of the low church branch of the Church of England. The church also hosts Catholic Church services.

The Emmanuel Church in East Park Street was created through the union of the Methodist, United Reformed and Baptist Union churches in Chatteris in 1990. It is based in the former United Reformed building in East Park Street. Several former chapel buildings exist around the town. The town has a Salvation Army citadel, also in East Park Street, and a Grace Baptist church, founded in 2010 and called Chatteris Community Church, meets in the King Edward centre on King Edward Street.

=== Migration ===
The majority of the population of Chatteris was born within the UK. 6.4% of residents were born outside the UK. This is below the national average of 13%.

Country of birth
Country	Count 2011	Percentage 2011
England	9,521	91.1%
Northern Ireland	29	0.3%
Scotland	157	1.5%
Wales	79	0.8%
UK not specified	0	0.0%
Ireland	44	0.4%
EU member countries in March 2001	107	1.0%
EU accession countries April 2001 to March 2011	245	2.3%
Other countries	271	2.6%

=== Education ===
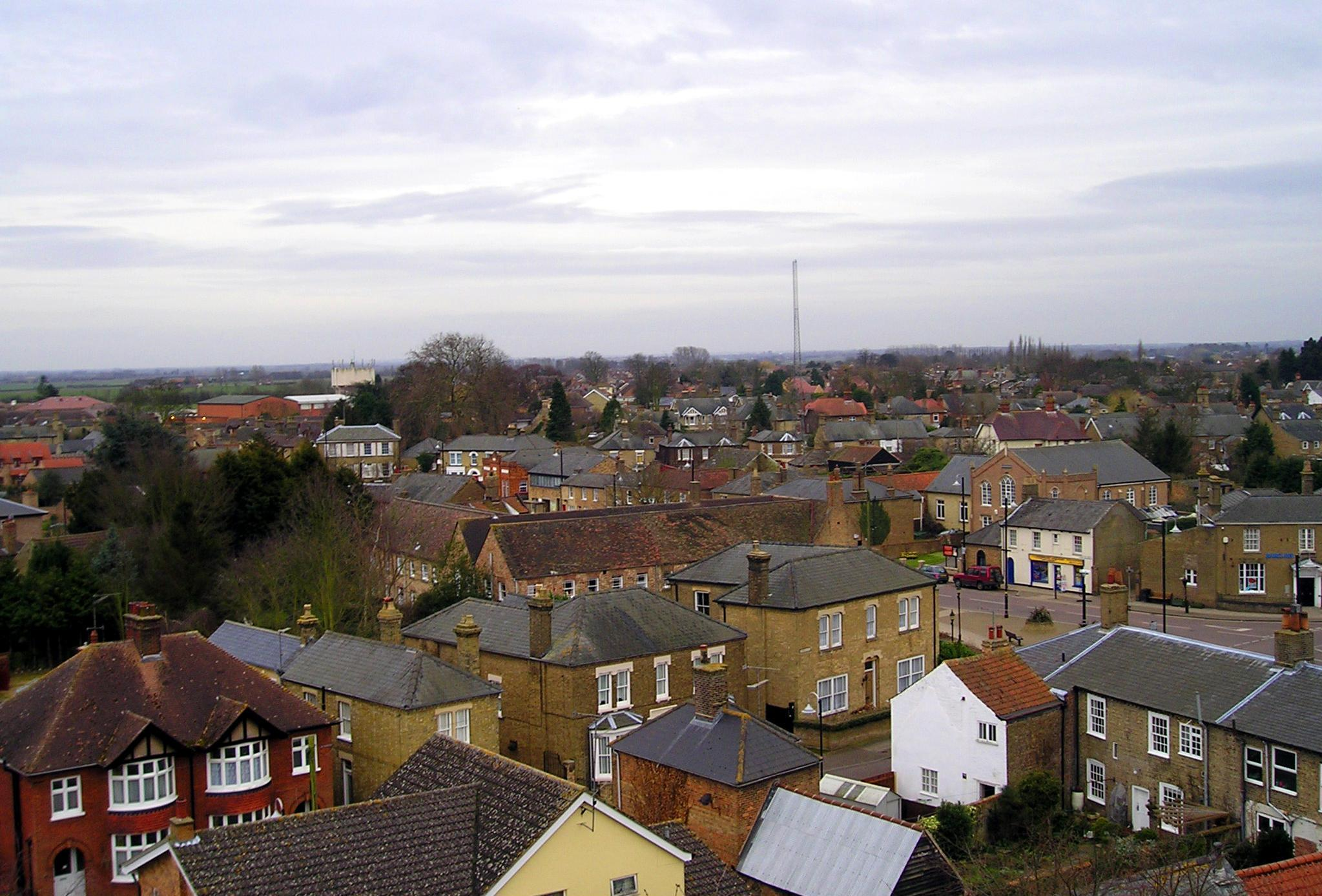
Chatteris from the church tower, looking South-West towards Market Hill and East Park Street. The Emmanuel Church, Salvation Army citadel and Cromwell School are visible.

The town has three primary schools, Kingsfield Primary School (created in 2003 by the amalgamation of the former Burnsfield School and King Edward School), Glebelands School, which opened in the early months of 1994 and Cromwell Primary which opened in 2021. Cromwell Community College is an all-through school admitting primary school and secondary school age pupils. It was founded in 1939. The Isle College used to have a presence in the town, with a base in Grove House. However, this closed following the college's merger with the College of West Anglia. The town has a library run by Cambridgeshire County Council.

== Sport ==
The town's football club, Chatteris Town, known as The Lillies were founded in 1920 and are currently members of the Peterborough and District Football League Premier Division. They play at the West Street ground. The women's team, Chatteris Town Lillies Ladies, was re-established in 2021, and are currently competing in Division Two of the Cambridgeshire Girls and Women's League. The youth section The Young Lillies has teams up to the age of U18.

The town also has a cricket club, Chatteris Cricket Club, which was founded in 1879. The club has five senior teams and four youth teams that compete in both the Fenland and Cambridgeshire leagues. Chatteris CC won the St Ivo Midweek League in 2008 and 2009 going both seasons unbeaten. The town also has a bowls club and a tennis club (St Peters). Chatteris Airfield is about 2 kilometres (1.2 mi) north-northeast, which is mainly used for skydiving, and is the base of the North London Skydiving Centre. A flying school is also based at the airfield.

The town has one swimming pool, the Empress, which is privately owned and is a registered charity run by three trustees. It is open to season ticket holders and can also be booked for private hires or group sessions. It is home of the Chatteris Kingfishers swimming club. Plans for a public swimming pool and leisure centre have been proposed by the council since 1990, but have yet to be approved. A new gym situated in the grounds of Cromwell Community College opened in 2013.

Fen skating was very popular in the past. An illustration from 1823 by George Cruikshank shows the Wisbech coach in the background of a skating match.

== Culture ==
=== Community activities and events ===
The town is noted for its annual display of Christmas lights, which are entirely funded by community donations and have been featured on BBC Look East. In June each year the town has a traditional festival weekend.

The town has a museum run by volunteers, with several permanent exhibitions about local history, the Fens, Victoriana and the railways. Chatteris also has a Scout club, an Army Cadet Force and a youth football team.

Chatteris has morning and evening Women's Institutes, which both meet at the King Edward Centre, and a Rotary Club which meet at the local fire station.

Since 2012 Chatteris has a branch of the University of the Third Age (U3A) which caters for people no longer in full time employment, with a talk every month at the general meeting held at the King Edward Centre, plus over 20 interest groups of various kinds, and a number of trips and theatre visits are also provided during the year.

Chatteris in Bloom is a charity responsible for entering the town in to the annual "Anglia in Bloom" competition. Chatteris achieved the highest gold award in 2017, 2018, 2019, 2022 and in 2023 was joint winner of Anglia in Bloom with Huntingdon.

The town has a brass band, founded in 1882, which competes in the East Anglian Brass Band Association.

=== Music ===
In 2005, British indie band Half Man Half Biscuit included a song entitled "For What Is Chatteris..." on their award-winning Achtung Bono album. The song extolled the virtues of the town, offset against how unsatisfying the best place in the world can suddenly become when the one you love is no longer there: "a market town that lacks quintessence / that's Chatteris without your presence". News of the song made the headlines of the Cambridgeshire Times and the Peterborough Evening Telegraph during September 2005, a month before the album's official release.

=== Media ===
Local news and television programmes are provided by BBC East and ITV Anglia. Television signals are received from the Sandy Heath TV transmitter. Local radio stations are BBC Radio Cambridgeshire, Heart East, and Greatest Hits Radio East. The town is served by the local newspapers Fenland Citizen and Cambs Times.

== Notable residents ==
- Eric Boon, boxer; British lightweight champion 1938–1944
- George William Burdett Clare, Victoria Cross recipient (d. 1917) after whom the doctors' surgery is named
- Sir George Herbert Farrar, South African mining magnate, politician and soldier
- John Percy Farrar, English soldier and mountaineer. President of the Alpine Club from 1917 to 1919 and a member of the Mount Everest Committee
- John Dunn Gardner, MP and landowner, resident of Chatteris House
- Dave Boy Green, boxer
- Dominic Mohan (former resident), former editor of The Sun newspaper
- Joe Perry, snooker player
- Joseph Ruston, engineer and MP
- Lindsay Shilling, principal trombonist at the Royal Opera House

== See also ==
- List of places in Cambridgeshire
