= Ramsey East railway station =

Former railway station in England

Coordinates: 52.4456°N 0.1113°W

Ramsey East

General information
- Location: Ramsey, Huntingdonshire; England
- Platforms: 1

Other information
- Status: Disused

History
- Original company: Great Eastern Railway
- Pre-grouping: Great Northern and Great Eastern Joint Railway
- Post-grouping: London and North Eastern Railway

Key dates
- 16 September 1889: Opened as Ramsey High Street
- 1 July 1923: Renamed Ramsey East
- 22 September 1930: Closed for passengers
- 17 September 1956: closed for freight
Location

Ramsey East railway station was a railway station in Ramsey, Cambridgeshire, which is now closed. It opened on 16 September 1889, and closed to passenger traffic on 22 September 1930, and to freight traffic on 17 September 1956. The site is now occupied by the west side of Bury Road Industrial Estate, and a new housing development aptly called Signal Road and The Sidings. It was the terminus of a branch line connected via Warboys railway station to Somersham, where it joined the Great Eastern Railway line between St Ives and March, which at its upper end towards March is now occupied by the route A141 between Chatteris and March.

Preceding station	Disused railways	Following station
Terminus	GN and GE Joint Railway	Warboys
