= John George Witt =

English barrister

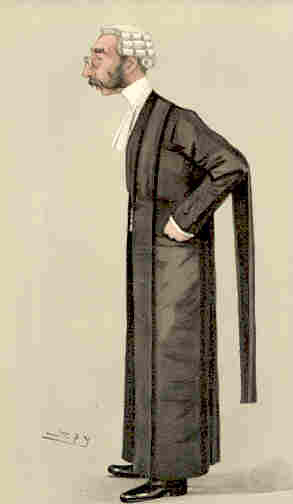
"A Sporting Lawyer" Witt QC as caricatured by Spy (Leslie Ward) in Vanity Fair, March 1898

John George Witt (24 September 1836, Denny Abbey, Waterbeach, Cambridgeshire – 7 February 1906, London) was an English barrister.

== Life ==
John George Witt was the second son of James Maling Witt (1799 – 1870), a prosperous Cambridgeshire farmer and barrister.

He was taught at home by a governess and then attended Eton College, where he was a King's Scholar, 'Keeper of the Wall' and 'Captain of the School,' and founded 'College Pop.' He went from Eton to King's College, Cambridge, where he was a Fellow from 1859, won the 'Hulsean Prize' in 1860, played football for the university against Oxford, and obtained his B.A. in 1860 and his M.A. in 1863.

Called to the Bar in 1864, he became a Special Pleader on the South-Eastern Circuit. In 1888 he married Emily Anne Taylor, daughter of James Taylor, Esq. He was appointed a Queen's Counsel in 1892, and was elected a Bencher of Lincoln's Inn in 1895. He was caricatured by 'Spy' as 'A Sporting Lawyer' in Vanity Fair in 1898. His recreations were recorded as football, cricket, hunting and driving.

From 1879 to 1894 he edited the Law Journal. His books dealt with disparate subjects: the law, the history of Christian doctrine, and (in Three Villages) the local history of villages in which he had successively lived: Waterbeach; Swaffham Prior in Cambridgeshire; and, latterly, Finchampstead in Berkshire.

John George Witt died on 7 February 1906, 'in an omnibus in the Strand, on his way to the Law Courts.'

== Works ==
- The Mutual Influence of the Christian Doctrine and the School of Alexandria, 1862
- Then and Now, 1897
- Life in the Law, 1900
- Three Villages
