= Fawley Hill Railway =

Privately owned heritage railway in Buckinghamshire, England

Coordinates: 51°34′1.7″N 0°54′40.1″W

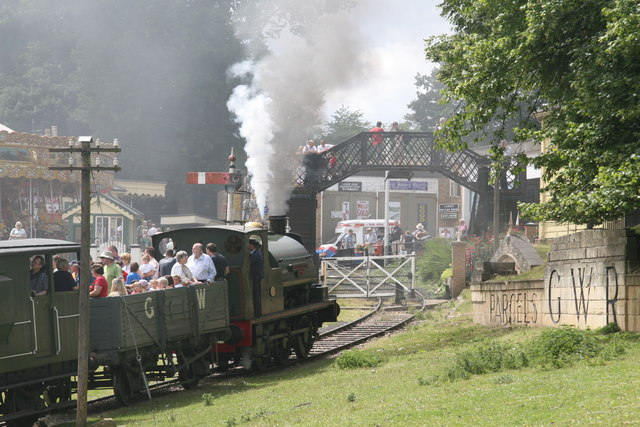
A 1913 Hudswell Clarke 0-6-0 ST steam locomotive on the Fawley Hill Railway. It was delivered to Sir Robert McAlpine and used on a series of major projects including Wembley Stadium.

Fawley Hill Railway is a privately owned heritage railway on the Fawley Hill estate of the late Sir William McAlpine at Fawley in Buckinghamshire, England.

An acknowledged railway enthusiast as well as a director of the construction company Sir Robert McAlpine, McAlpine returned to Hayes depot during the Beeching Axe to find that the company's Hudswell Clarke 0-6-0ST No.31 was for sale for £100. He purchased the locomotive, and moved it to Fawley Hill. This marked the start in 1965 of the 4 ft 8 1/2 in (1,435 mm) standard gauge Fawley Hill Railway, a private railway which now runs to over a mile long, combining the steepest gradient at 1:13 on a British standard gauge railway, and includes:

- The Great Eastern Railway Somersham railway station
- Midland Railway signal box from Shobnall Maltings, near Burton upon Trent
- The footbridge from Brading on the Isle of Wight, Bridge No 25, where it spanned the Ryde Pier to Shanklin line
- A carved pediment from Broad Street railway station
- The platform shelter from Bourne End railway station
- Fawley Signal Box (formerly a Shunters' Cabin from Upwell Street Wharf, Sheffield)
- Inverernie Station Shelter (formally at Thrapston on the Kettering-Cambridge line)

In addition, the estate surrounding the railway line is adorned with several prominent architectural features which McAlpine acquired – although these were received mostly as donations; these include some early cast-iron bridge parapets, several arched structures from prominent London locations and the original Wembley Stadium Twin Towers flagpoles. The flagpoles were sold at auction in summer 2026 and will shortly be relocated to an unknown site in the North of England.

The estate contains several varieties of deer together with emu, peacocks, meerkats and wallabies.

The railway, together with Sir William McAlpine's extensive private railway museum, is operated and maintained on behalf of Fawley Hill by volunteers from Fawley Museum Society.

The resident steam locomotive, Hudswell Clarke 0-6-0ST works number 1026 "Sir Robert McAlpine & Sons No. 31", returned to steam in 2026 following an overhaul at Didcot Railway Centre. but suffered a piston ring failure shortly afterwards. The locomotive is due to be back in service for the 2027 season. An ex-British Rail Class 03 diesel-mechanical shunter (D2120) is also based on the railway together with two Hibberd 0-4-0 Planet diesel-mechanical industrial locomotives.

Fawley Hill Railway holds open days on a limited number of weekends during the summer months. These are known as Invitation Days and are strictly ticket-only events for which prospective visitors apply through the Fawley Museum web-site (www.fawleymuseum.org). Tickets are not available on the day.

Fawley Hill Railway also hosts mid-week visits by various groups; again with applications made through the Fawley Museum web-site.

Fawley Hill has recently been used for the filming of an episode of the TV detective series Midsomer Murders. The museum was previously used as a venue for The Great Model Railway Challenge for Channel 5 in 2018 and 2019. In 2021, Fawley Hill was visited by Tim Dunn in an episode of UKTV's series The Architecture the Railways Built. The railway was featured in Season 3, episode 4.
