= Warboys railway station =

Former railway station in England

Coordinates: 52.4179°N 0.0720°W

Warboys

General information
- Location: Warboys, Huntingdonshire; England
- Platforms: 2

Other information
- Status: Disused

History
- Original company: Great Eastern Railway
- Pre-grouping: Great Northern and Great Eastern Joint Railway
- Post-grouping: London and North Eastern Railway

Key dates
- 16 September 1889: Opened
- 22 September 1930: Closed for passengers
- 13 July 1964: Closed for freight
Location

Warboys railway station was a railway station in Warboys, Cambridgeshire, which opened in 1889 and closed completely in 1964.

Preceding station	Disused railways	Following station
Ramsey East	Great Northern and Great Eastern Joint Railway	Somersham
