= Chatteris railway station =

Former railway station in Cambridgeshire, England

Coordinates: 52.4541°N 0.0404°E

Chatteris
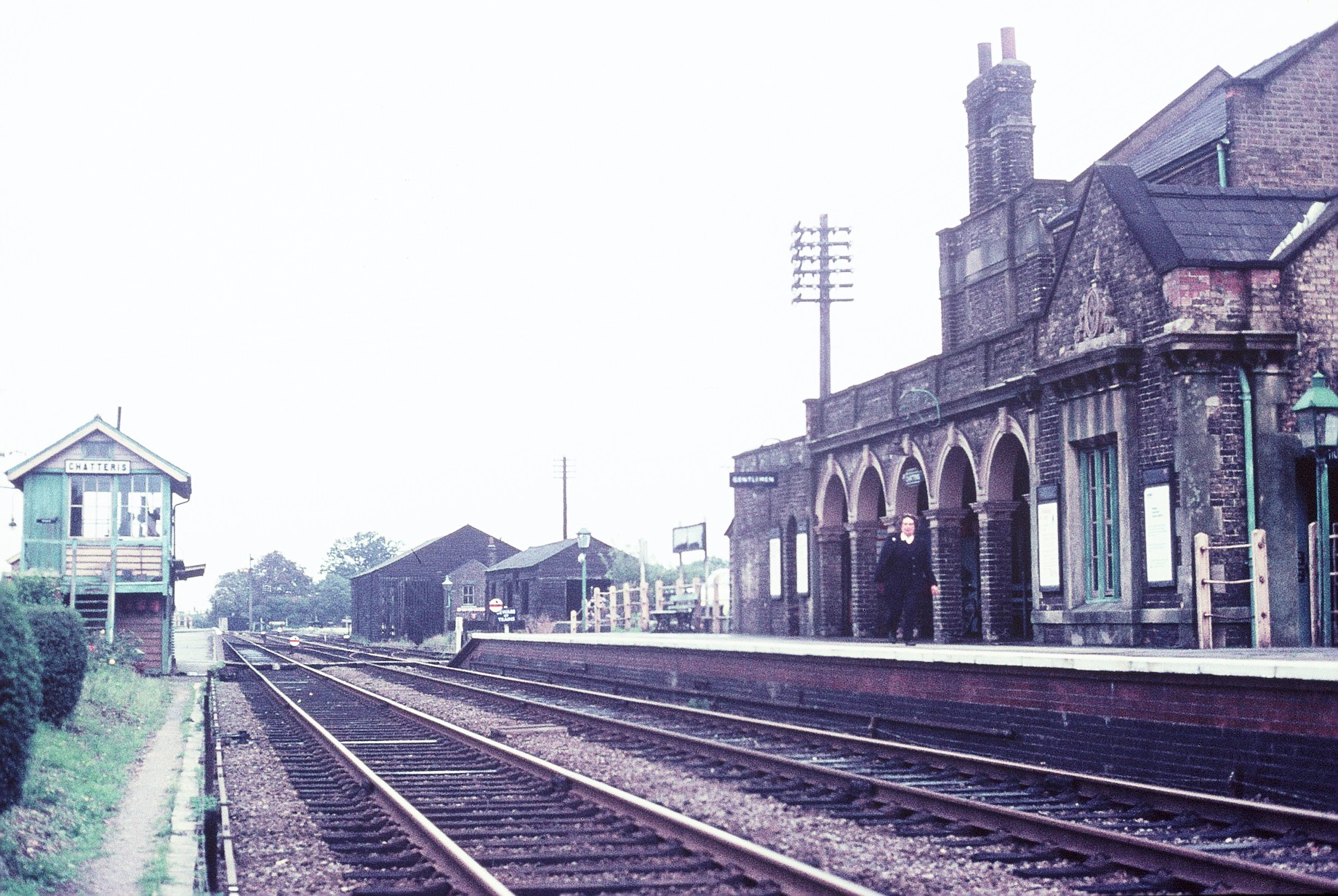

General information
- Location: Chatteris, Fenland; England
- Grid reference: TL387860
- Platforms: 2

Other information
- Status: Disused

History
- Original company: Eastern Counties Railway
- Pre-grouping: Great Northern and Great Eastern Joint Railway
- Post-grouping: London and North Eastern Railway

Key dates
- 1 February 1848: Opened
- 18 April 1966: Closed to freight
- 6 March 1967: Closed to passengers
Location

Chatteris railway station was a station in Chatteris, Cambridgeshire, on the line between St Ives and March, which was built as a branch of the Great Eastern Railway in 1848 and was later incorporated (on 6 March 1882) into the Great Northern and Great Eastern Joint Railway, a more major route between Huntingdon and Doncaster via Lincoln, which included a new line between Spalding and Lincoln.

The railway through Chatteris was closed to passengers on 6 March 1967, in the wake of the Beeching Report, along with the joint line between March and St Ives. The part of the joint line between St Ives and Huntingdon had already closed to passengers on 15 June 1959, but St Ives retained the line to Cambridge until 1970. On 29 November 1982 the part of the joint line between March and Spalding was closed, but the route north of Spalding still exists, with services routed via Peterborough.

Chatteris station was demolished in the early 1970s and the station site and trackbed used for the new alignment of the A141 road.

Preceding station	Disused railways	Following station
Somersham	Great Eastern Railway; St Ives to March Line	Wimblington
