= Chatteris Abbey =

Benedictine nunnery in Cambridgeshire

Coordinates: 52.4530°N 0.0489°E

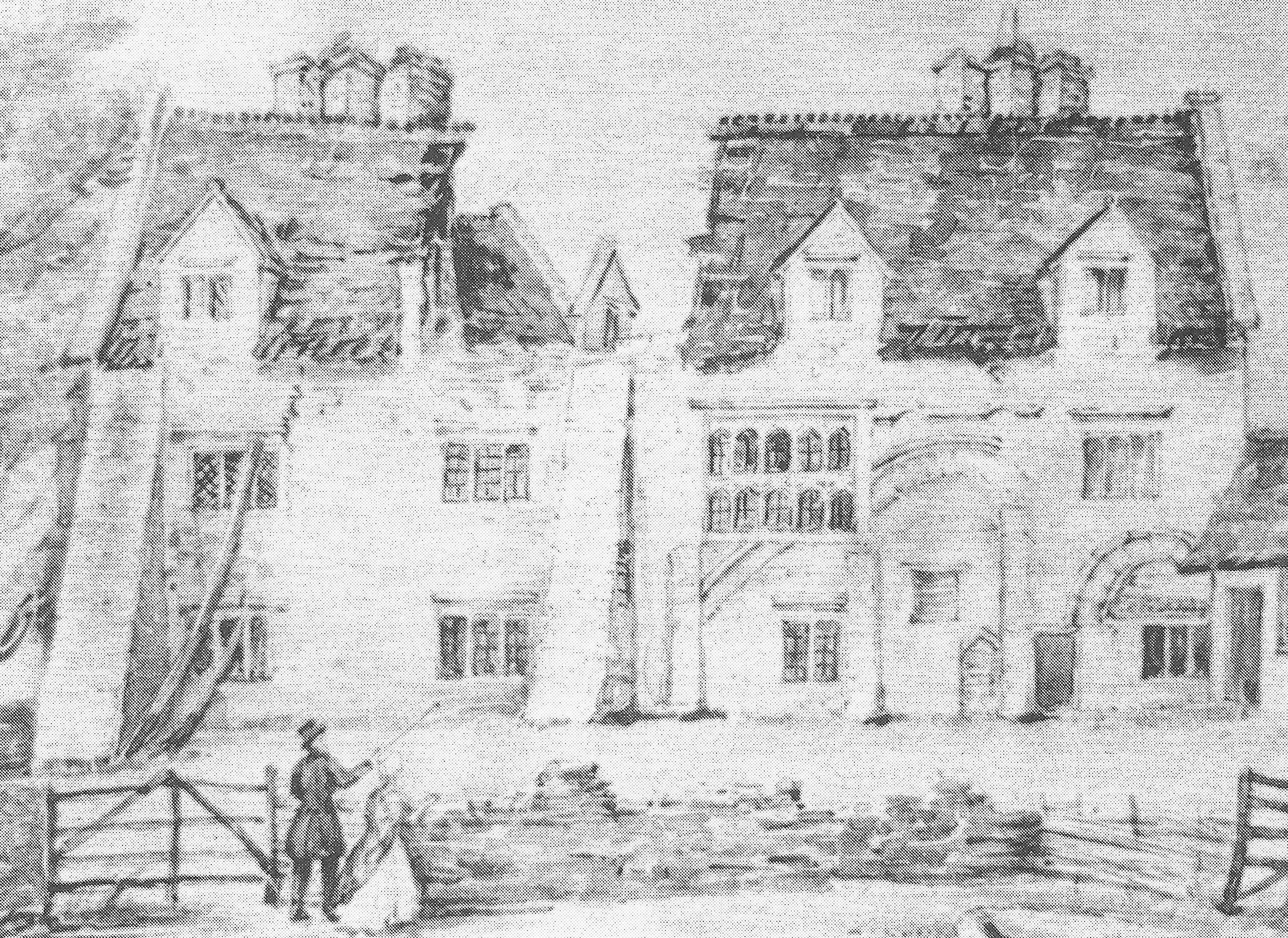
An 1847 watercolour of Park House, Chatteris before its demolition. Elements of the dissolved abbey can be seen in the walls, including Norman arches at right.

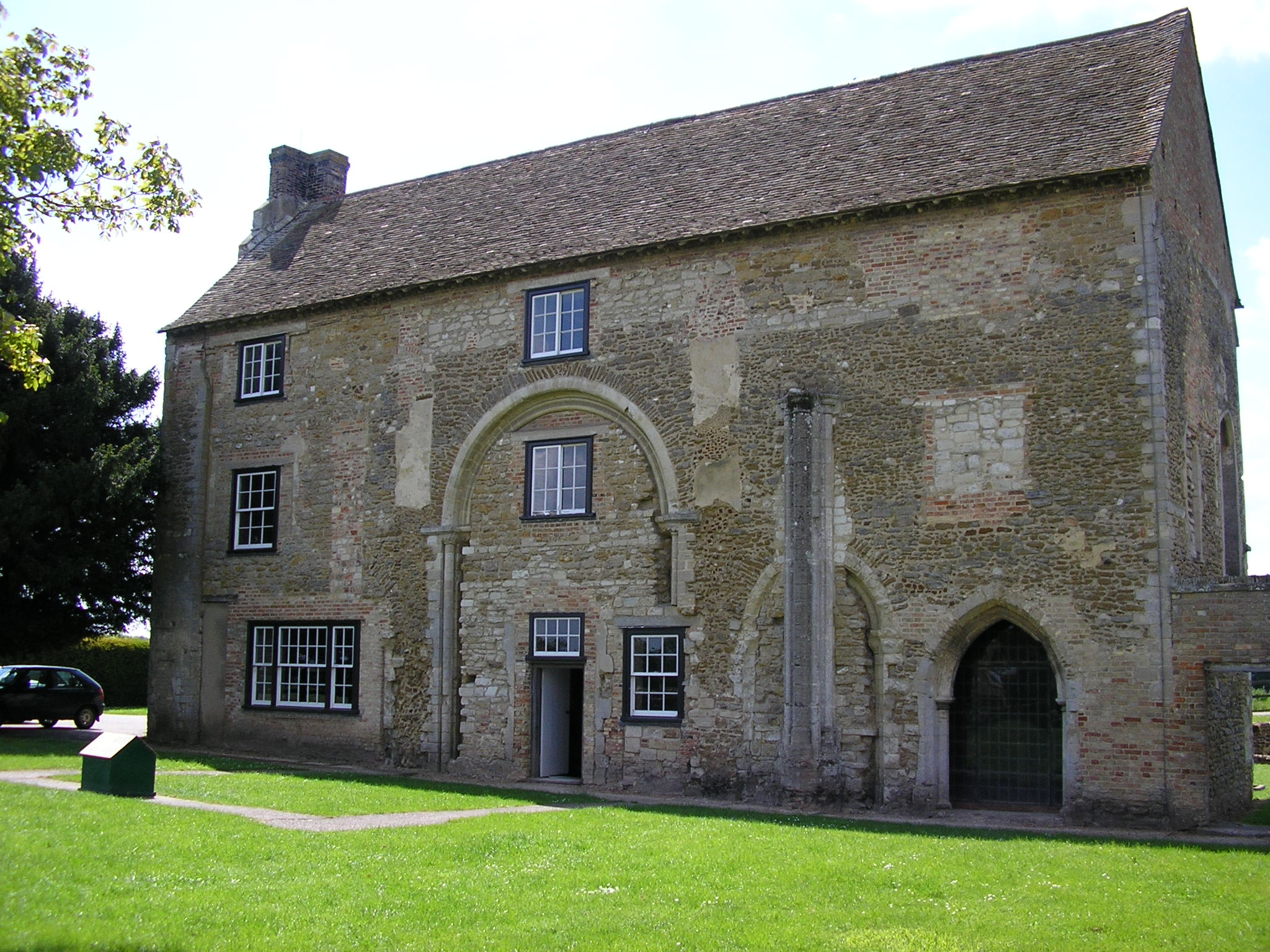
A comparison photo of the surviving Denny Abbey between Ely and Cambridge, showing similar surviving embedded Norman arches. Denny Abbey is now maintained by English Heritage.

Chatteris Abbey in Chatteris in the Isle of Ely, Cambridgeshire was founded as a monastery for Benedictine nuns in 1016 by Eadnoth, Bishop of Dorchester on Thames. Before 1310 much of the monastery was destroyed by fire. By the middle of the 14th century, some of the local families appear to have been using the nave of the monastic church as their parochial church.

Never a wealthy abbey, it survived the first wave of closures during the Dissolution of the Monasteries and was finally surrendered to the King's commissioners in 1538, by which time there were eleven nuns in residence. At this date many families still used the abbey church as parochial but this, unusually, did not save it from demolition, the parishioners being transferred to St Peter and St Paul's Church nearby. A range of the cloister buildings survived as part of a mansion known as Park House. This was demolished in 1847 and with the exception of a few wall fragments, the site has now completely vanished beneath streets and housing; the Park Streets of Chatteris mark its boundaries.
