= Somersham, Cambridgeshire =

Village in Cambridgeshire, England

Coordinates: 52.382255°N 0.00061°E

Somersham
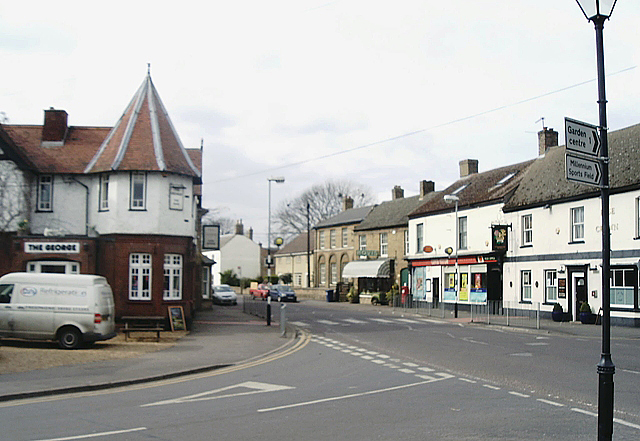

- Location within Cambridgeshire
- Population: 3,802 (2001); 3,810 (2011)
- OS grid reference: TL361779
- Civil parish: Somersham
- District: Huntingdonshire
- Shire county: Cambridgeshire
- Region: East
- Country: England
- Sovereign state: United Kingdom
- Post town: HUNTINGDON
- Postcode district: PE28
- Dialling code: 01487
- Police: Cambridgeshire
- Fire: Cambridgeshire
- Ambulance: East of England
- UK Parliament: North West Cambridgeshire

Somersham is a village and civil parish in Cambridgeshire, England. Somersham lies approximately 9 miles (14 km) east of Huntingdon and 4 miles (6 km) north of St Ives. Somersham is situated within Huntingdonshire which is a non-metropolitan district of Cambridgeshire as well as being a historic county of England.

There has been a settlement in this corner of the country for at least 2,500 years and probably much longer than that. The village may not be full of ancient buildings, but it possesses a rich heritage of recorded history. Somersham lies on the Greenwich meridian line. There is a marker on the pavement in the High Street denoting the location of the October 1884 Greenwich Prime Zero meridian line.

There was once a railway station at Somersham connecting it to the towns of March and St Ives, as well as a short branch to Ramsey.

== History ==
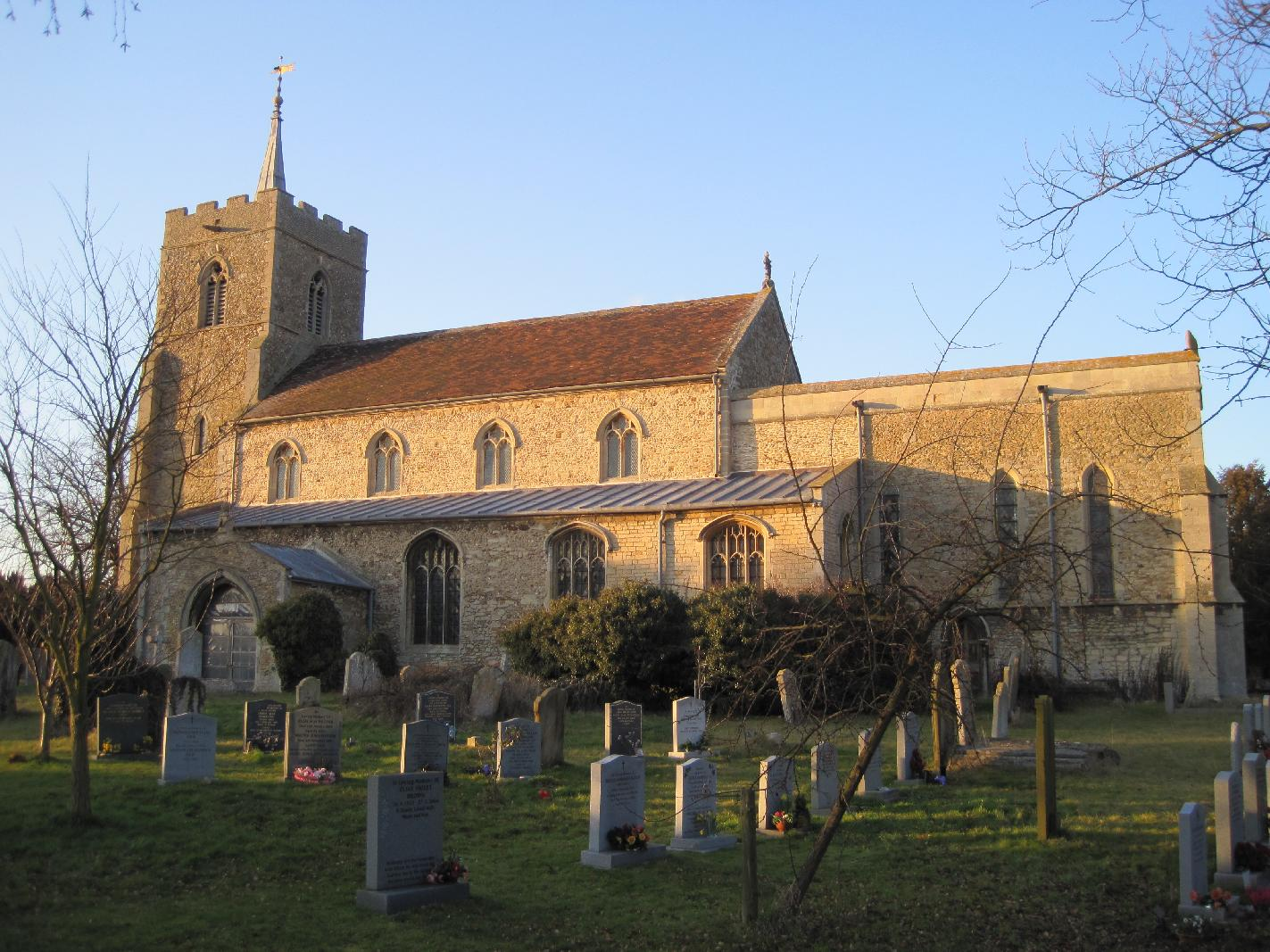
St John the Baptist's Church, Somersham

The manor of Somersham was held by the Abbots (later Bishops) of Ely who obtained it from the Anglo Saxon Ealdorman Byrhtnoth following his death at the Battle of Maldon in Essex in 991 AD.

Somersham was listed as Summersham in the Domesday Book in the Hundred of Hurstingstone in Huntingdonshire. In 1086 there was one manor at Somersham and 41 households. There were eleven ploughlands with the capacity for a further one, 20 acres (8 hectares) of meadows, 1,361 acres (551 hectares) of woodland, and three fisheries.

The manor passed to The Crown when Elizabeth I seized it via dubious means at the end of the 16th century. New trustees were appointed in 1631, and in 1634 the residue of the term was settled for life as jointure on Henrietta Maria, Queen of Charles I, and power was given to her trustees to grant leases for terms not exceeding 21 years. It remained in royal hands until the aftermath of the English Civil War, when it was disposed of by Parliament. The manor was sold to Robert Blackborne of Westminster in 1653, who in turn sold to Oliver Cromwell's brother-in-law Valentine Walton, which ultimately resulted in a suit between the two parties. Following the Restoration, the manor was returned to the Crown.

There was a substantial manor house at Somersham with formal gardens dating to the 12th century and possibly earlier. A Tudor palace was constructed over the mediaeval building by Bishop James Stanley, of Ely, under Henry VII. John Lesley, Bishop of Ross, a diplomat for Mary, Queen of Scots, came to Somersham and Fenstanton as a prisoner of Richard Cox, Bishop of Ely in 1571 and wrote about a deer hunt in the park. In September 1588, a survey of the property was made, naming several rooms in house and noting a bridge from the moated house to the park. The estate came to the crown. In 1604, anticipating a visit, James VI and I wrote to the keeper Sir John Cutts requesting that he stock the park. By the time the Hammond family came into possession of the palace site in the late 17th century, the buildings were in a poor state of repair. They were pulled down in the middle of the 18th century.

In the latter part of the 14th century, the church in Somersham was a living in possession of the English Cardinal and papal courtier Adam Easton and he relied on its wealth until his death in 1397.

During the 18th century there was a Spa just outside the town that was actively promoted by one of the royal surgeons. James Hammond, an elegiac poet who died in 1742, was born and brought up in Somersham; his work remained popular throughout the 18th and 19th centuries, being reprinted several times, but is no longer well known today.

== Government ==
As a civil parish, Somersham has a parish council, consisting of fifteen councillors. The second tier of local government is Huntingdonshire District Council. Somersham is a district ward and is represented on the district council by two councillors. The highest tier of local government is Cambridgeshire County Council Somersham is part of the electoral division of Somersham and Earith and is represented on the county council by one councillor.

At Westminster Somersham is in the parliamentary constituency of North West Cambridgeshire, currently represented by the Conservative MP Shailesh Vara, who has represented the constituency since 2005.

Somersham was in the historic and administrative county of Huntingdonshire until 1965. From 1965, the village was part of the new administrative county of Huntingdon and Peterborough. Then in 1974, following the Local Government Act 1972, Somersham became a part of the county of Cambridgeshire.

== Demography ==
=== Population ===
In the period 1801 to 1901 the population of Somersham was recorded every ten years by the UK census. During this time the population was in the range of 833 (the lowest was in 1801) and 1653 (the highest was in 1851).

From 1901, a census was taken every ten years with the exception of 1941 (due to the Second World War).

Parish	1911	1921	1931	1951	1961	1971	1981	1991	2001	2011
Somersham	1404	1466	1417	1317	1401	1513	2985	3538	3802	3810

All population census figures from report Historic Census figures Cambridgeshire to 2011 by Cambridgeshire Insight.

In 2011, the parish covered an area of 4,670 acres (1,890 hectares) and the population density of Somersham in 2011 was 522. 1 persons per square mile (201. 6 per square kilometre).

== Culture and community ==
Containing a public house, two schools, and many shops, it is a well catered village, despite the recent closing of a number of small shops.

=== Sport and leisure ===
The local football club, Somersham Town, plays in the Cambridgeshire League, having previously been members of the Eastern Counties League.

Somersham Town Band is the only brass band in the old county of Huntingdonshire. It can trace its history back to 1919, although the current band was reformed in 1980 after being dormant during the 1970s.

== Transport ==
From 1848 to 1967 the village was served by Somersham railway station, which was part of the Great Eastern Railway between St Ives and March.

The village is currently served by bus services that run from St Ives to Ramsey, as well as from St Ives to Cambridge as part of the Cambridgeshire Guided Busway.
