= Denny Abbey =

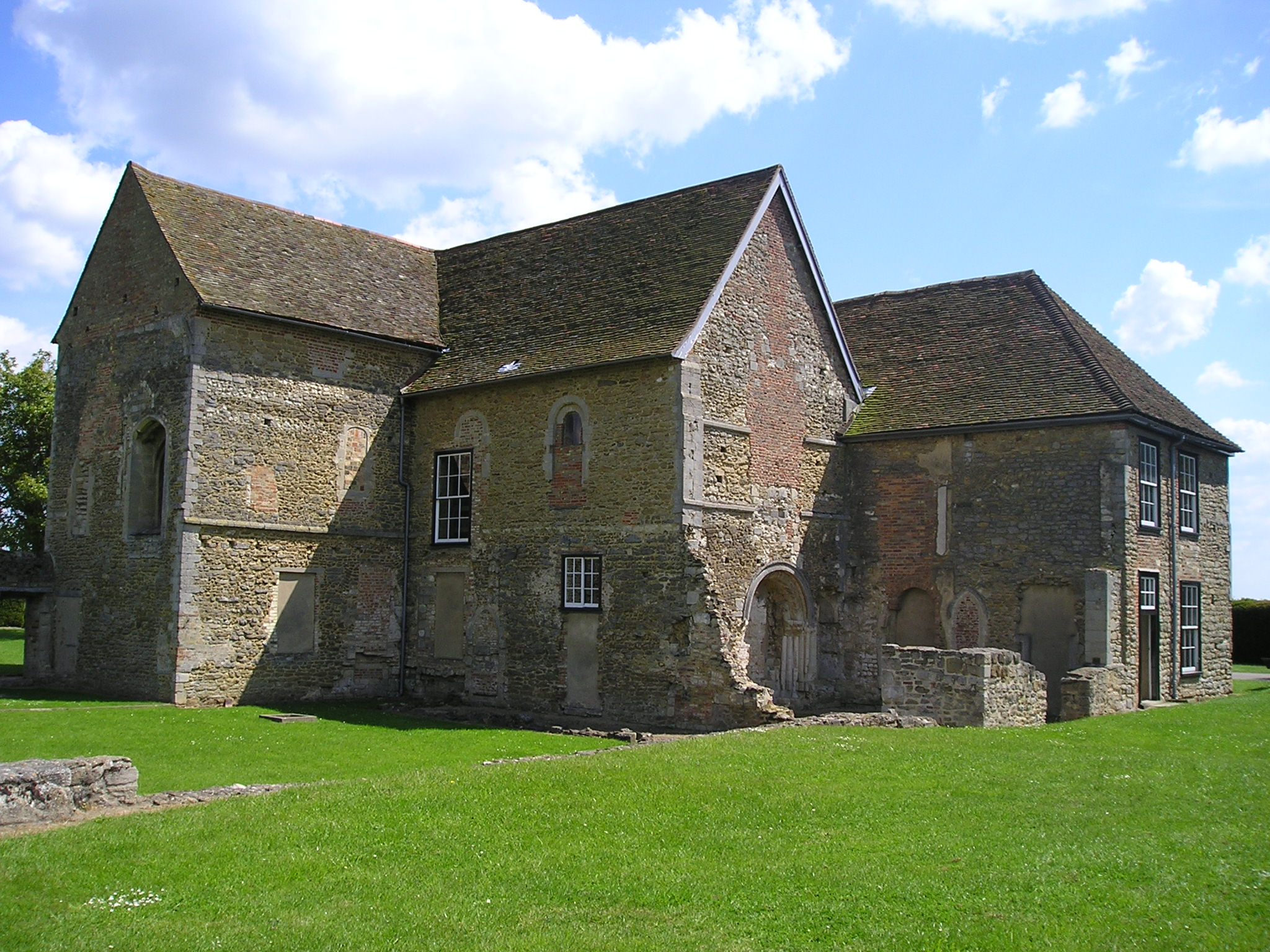
- The main remnants of the abbey buildings, showing the door to the Templar church at centre, and the priest's house at right

- Location within Cambridgeshire

General information
- Type: Abbey
- Location: Waterbeach, Waterbeach, England
- Coordinates: 52°17′37″N 00°11′12″E
- Elevation: 6m

Website
- https://www.english-heritage.org.uk/visit/places/denny-abbey-and-the-farmland-museum/

References
- https://explore.osmaps.com/

Denny Abbey is a former abbey near Waterbeach, about 6 miles (10 km) north of Cambridge in Cambridgeshire, England. It is now the Farmland Museum and Denny Abbey.

The monastery was inhabited by a succession of three different religious orders. The site is a scheduled monument. The church and refectory buildings survive and are Grade I listed buildings. Also on the site is a barn built in the 17th century from stone taken from the abbey.

The site, on an ancient road between Cambridge and Ely, was settled by farmers as early as the Roman period. The Domesday Book of 1086 recorded that it was owned by Edith the Fair (also known as Swanneck), the consort of King Harold, in 1066. It was owned subsequently by the Breton lord, Alan, 1st Earl of Richmond. The place-name "Denny" is first attested in Templar records of 1176, where it appears as Daneya and Deneia. The name is thought to mean "Danes' Island".

== Benedictine monastery ==
A group of Benedictine monks, dependent upon Ely Abbey, moved here from their water-logged monastery at Elmeney (a vanished settlement about a mile to the northeast) in the 1150s, at the suggestion of Conan IV of Brittany. They built a church and monastery, called Denny Priory, which opened in 1159. The crossing and transepts are the only parts of the original abbey that remain today. In 1169 the monks returned to Ely and the site was transferred to the Knights Templar.

== Preceptory of the Knights Templars ==
The Templars built a number of additions, including a large Norman-style arched doorway and a refectory. Denny became a hospital for sick members of the Order in the mid-13th century. By the end of that century, the Knights had lost their power, and in 1308, Edward II had all the members of the Order arrested and imprisoned for alleged heresy, confiscating their property. Denny was then given to the Knights Hospitaller, who took no active interest in the property. In 1324 it was taken back by the Crown.

== House of Poor Clares ==
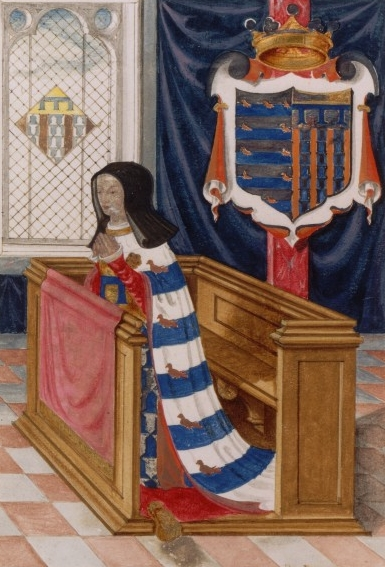
Marie de St Pol at prayer. Her cloak bears her coat of arms (Bibliothèque nationale de France). The arms are now borne by Pembroke College, Cambridge.

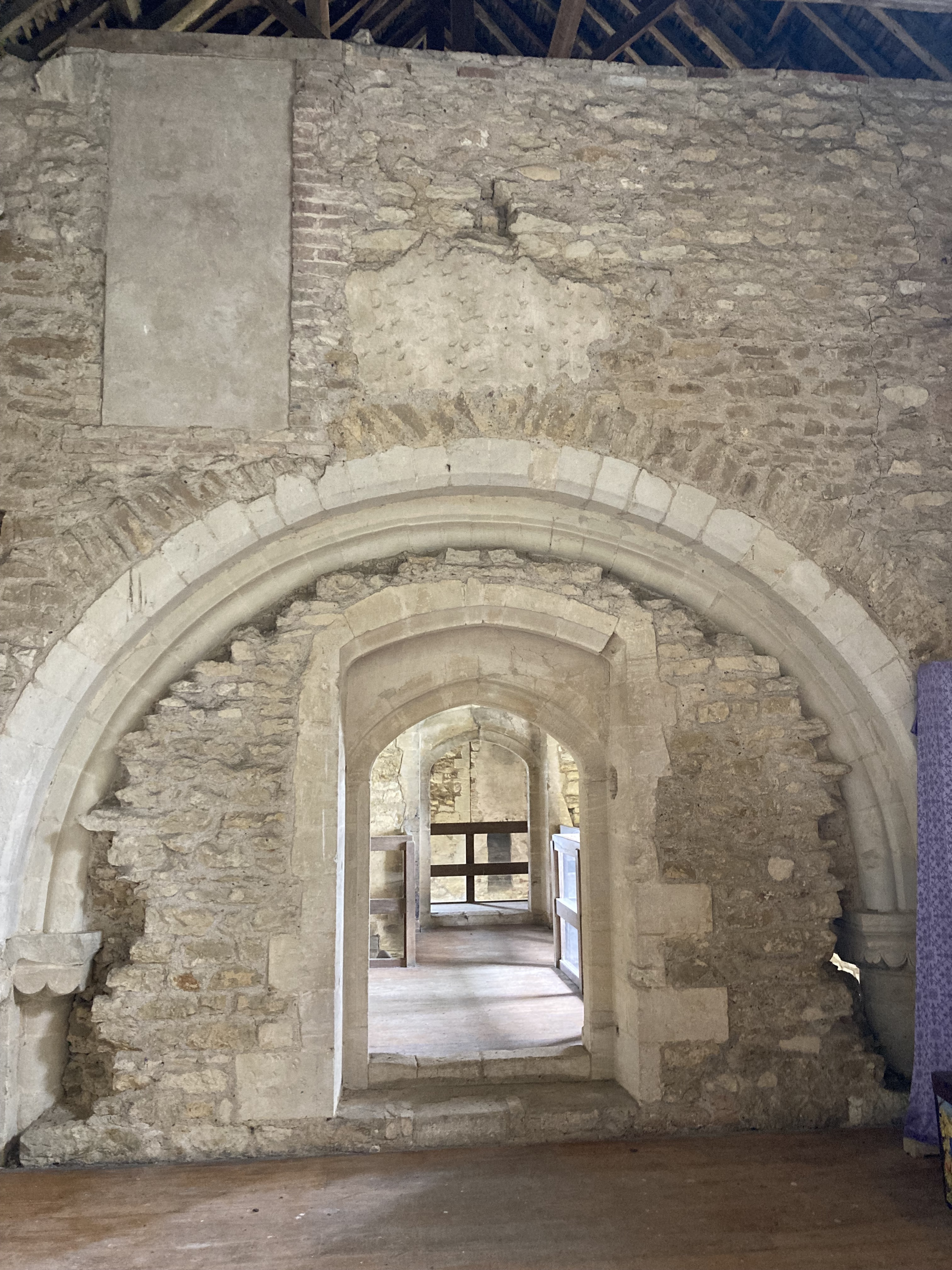
Remains of Marie de St Pol’s first-floor private quarters in Denny Abbey. A later blocked door can be seen above left

In 1327, Edward III gave the Priory to a young widow, Marie de St Pol, Countess of Pembroke (1303-1377), known for her founding of Pembroke College, Cambridge. Countess Marie turned what had been the Abbey church into her lodgings. She had a new church built and gave the remainder of the priory to the Franciscan Poor Clares. This community of nuns moved from their flood-prone Waterbeach Abbey.

The priory was expanded in this period, with comfortable quarters for the Countess, who never entered the Poor Clares, and spartan accommodation for the nuns. The priory began to be called Denny Abbey during this period, despite the fact that the term "abbey" is never used by the nuns of that Order.

The Countess died in 1377 and was buried before the high altar of the nuns' church in Denny Abbey, but the precise location of her grave is now lost.

== Abbesses of Denny ==
A list of the Abbesses of Denny:

- Katherine de Bolewyk, first abbess 1342, occurs 1351
- Margaret, occurs 1361
- Joan Colcestre, occurs 1379
- Isabel Kendale, occurs 1391, 1404
- Agnes Massingham, elected 1412
- Agnes Bernard, occurs 1413
- Margery Milley, occurs 1419, 1430-1
- Katherine Sybyle, occurs 1434, 1449
- Joan Keteryche, occurs 1459, 1462, died 1479
- Margaret Assheby, occurs 1480, 1487, 1493
- Elizabeth Throckmorton, occurs 1512, last abbess (who retired to live with her nephew George Throckmorton at Coughton Court in Warwickshire). She took with her when she left the wooden dole-gate of Denny Abbey, carved with her name, which can still be seen at Coughton Court.

== Secular use ==
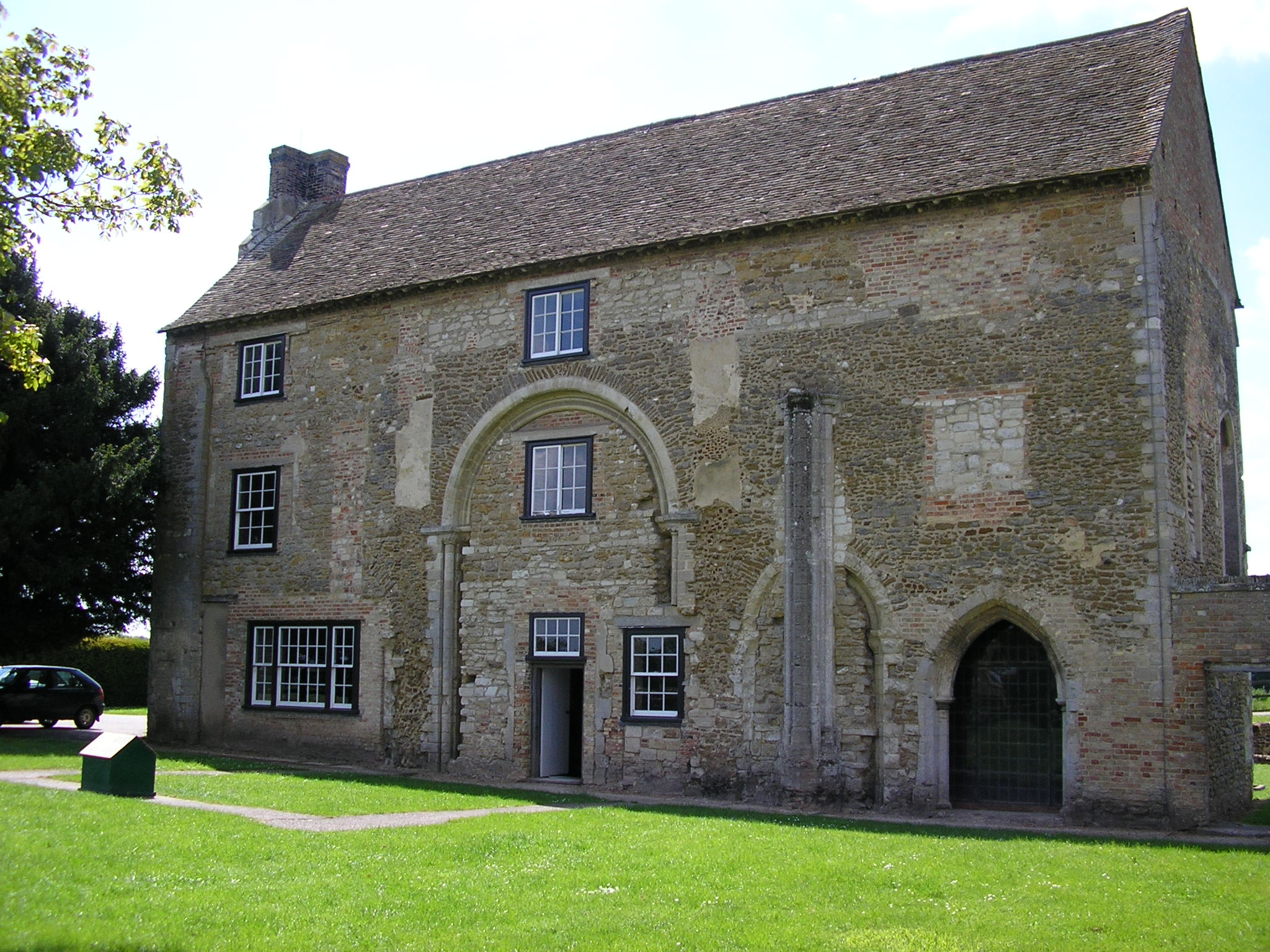
The former farmhouse converted from Denny Abbey’s church, showing at centre the filled-in arch of the Benedictine crossing, behind which were Marie de St Pol’s quarters. The tall stone pillar set in the wall to the right is a relic of the later nuns' church.

The abbey was closed in 1536, during the Dissolution of the Monasteries, and was once more taken over by the Crown. The last of the nuns had left within two years. The Abbess's lodge, originally built for the Countess, was retained as a farmhouse, and the Refectory as a barn, but the nave was demolished. In 1628 the abbey passed into private ownership.

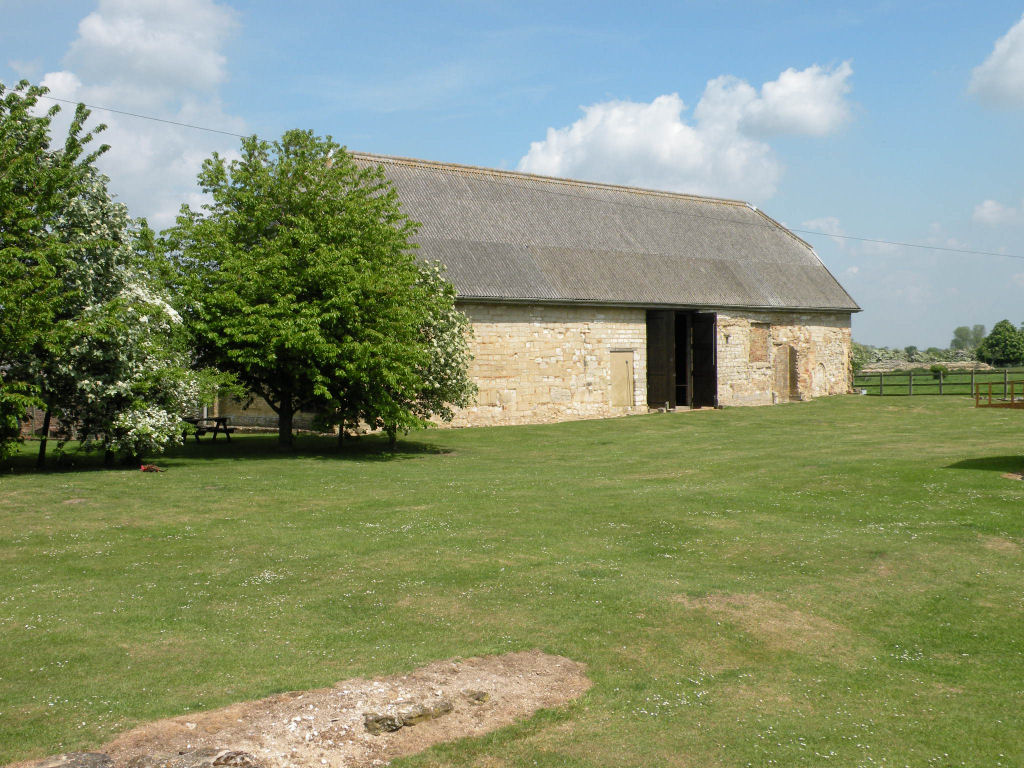
17th-century barn built of stone salvaged from Denny Abbey. The roof is modern.

In 1663 the Abbey estate was modestly valued at £58.4s.4d, as listed in the will of a Richard Kettle. By 1686, Joseph Kettle of Denny Abbey, whose connection to Richard Kettle is unclear, had grown the value over twenty-fold, to £1,223.15s.0d. So it was perhaps Joseph who was responsible for the substantial late 17th-century changes to the farm buildings.

The barrister John George Witt was born at Denny Abbey in 1836. Pembroke College, Cambridge, which had also been founded by the Countess of Pembroke in 1347, bought the site in 1928.

== Public ownership and museum ==
The abbey, nuns' refectory and surrounding land remained a farm until they were leased in 1947 to the Ministry of Works, which later transferred them to English Heritage.

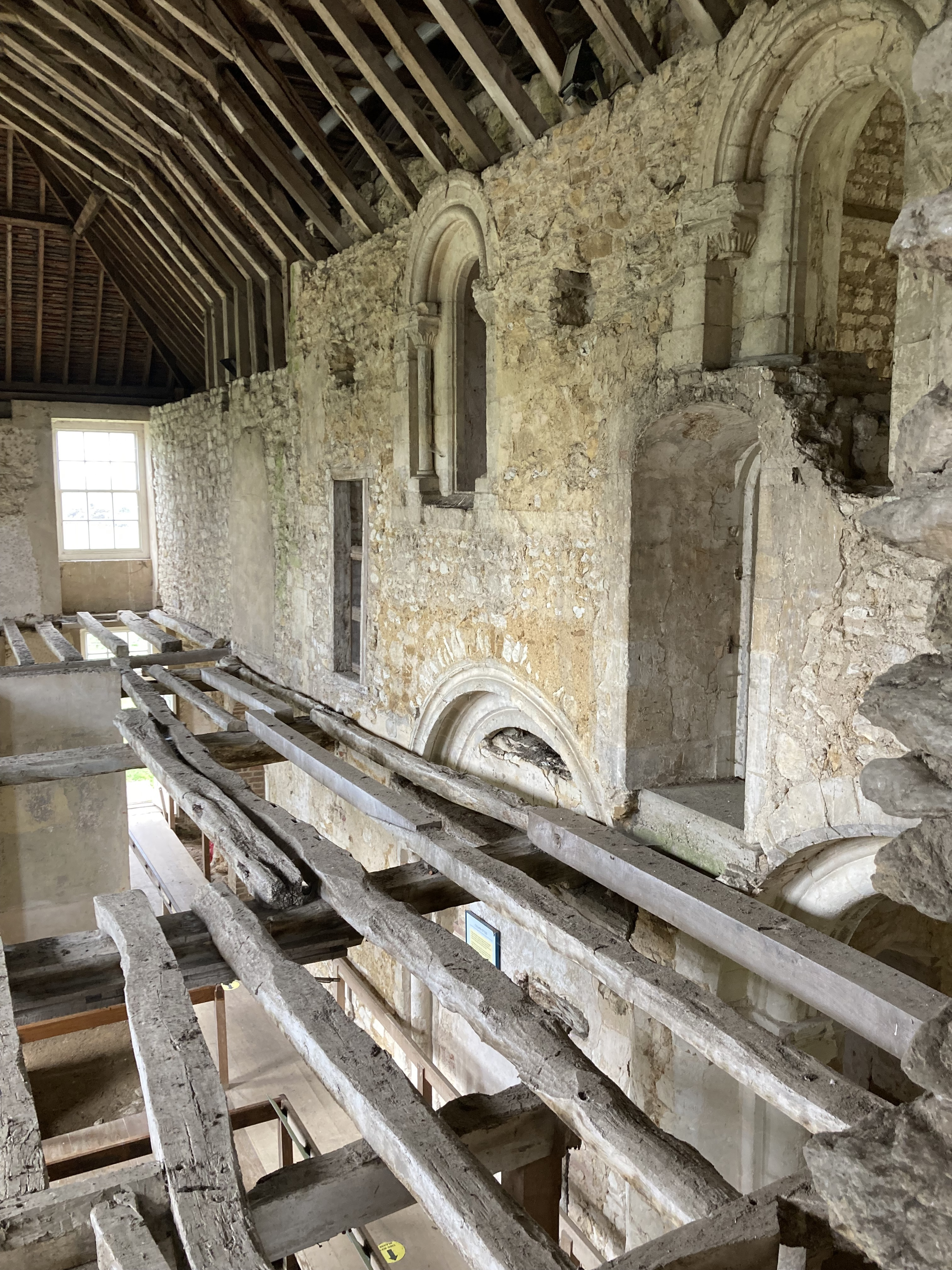
Norman interior of Denny Abbey, exposed by the Ministry of Works

The abbey, partially restored in the 1960s, is open to the public alongside the Farmland Museum, who manage the abbey on behalf of English Heritage.

The Farmland Museum, which opened in 1997, has a shop, café and an education centre, running courses for local schools. Farm buildings including the 17th-century barn have been converted into displays of local history and farming, including a 1940s farm labourer's cottage, a 1930s village shop, and displays on local crafts and skills. Many of the old farm tools and machinery came from a museum at nearby Haddenham which closed. It was at Haddenham where interviews were made in the 1970s with local farming people, recording their stories dating back to the beginning of the 20th century.

The whole site, known as The Farmland Museum and Denny Abbey, is open from April to October, and there are regular special event days.

Note: The spellings 'Denny' and 'Denney' appear with equal frequency in the historical literature. The latter spelling is no longer used locally, in modern times.

== See also ==
- Isleham Priory Church, another Cambridgeshire priory once possessed by Pembroke College, Cambridge, now in the care of English Heritage
- Chatteris Abbey, a similar building in Cambridgeshire, since demolished
