= Sir Glynne Welby, 3rd Baronet =

British politician (1806–1875)

Sir Glynne Earle Welby-Gregory, 3rd Baronet (26 June 1806 – 23 August 1875), born Glynne Earle Welby, was a British Tory (and then Conservative Party) Member of Parliament.

== Early life and family ==
Glynne Earle Welby was born on 26 June 1806, the eldest son of Sir William Earle Welby, 2nd Baronet, of Denton, near Grantham, and his wife, Wilhelmina, daughter of William Spry, who was Governor of Barbados from 1767 to 1772. The family claimed descent from landowners who came over with the Norman conquest, but their origins have only been traced with certainty to John Welby, a subsidy collector at Denton in 1523; one of his descendants bought the manor in 1648 and occupied the manor house. His great-grandson, William, was made a baronet and represented Grantham in Parliament (1802–06), while his son, the 2nd baronet, occupied the same seat for thirteen years, between 1807 and 1820. Glynne Welby was educated at Rugby School and Oriel College, Oxford, where he matriculated in 1824. He succeeded his father as baronet on 3 November 1852 and took the additional surname of Gregory by royal licence on 5 July 1861, to comply with the will of Gregory of Harlaxton.

On 6 March 1828, Welby married Frances, the youngest daughter of Sir Montague Cholmeley, 1st Baronet. She died on 9 October 1881. They had seven sons and four daughters, including William Earle (1829–1898), who succeeded to the baronetcy and was a member of parliament, and Alfred Cholmeley Earle (1849–1937), a member of parliament for Taunton. Three other sons and a daughter died unmarried: Captain Henry Glynne Earle (1830–1876), who served in the 48th Regiment; Rev. Philip James Earle (1842–1873), who was educated at Magdalen College, Oxford and served as Rector of Stroxton from 1863 until his death; Hugh Richard Earle (1845–1862), who served in the Royal Navy and died aboard HMS James Watt; and Cecily (d. 1869). Of the remainder:

- Rev. Walter Hugh Earle, JP (1833–1912) was educated at Corpus Christi College, Oxford and served as Rector of Strensham (1860–62), Bearwood (1862–67), and Harston (1867). He married, firstly in 1861, Frances (d. 1875), youngest daughter of Alfred Ollivant, Bishop of Llandaff; and secondly, in 1875, Florence Laura, eldest daughter of George Sloane Stanley, Rector of Branstone.
- Edward Montague Earle, JP (1836–1926) was a barrister and Stipendary Magistrate in Sheffield; in 1870, he married Sarah Elizabeth (d. 1909), only child of Robert Everard of Fulney House, Lincolnshire. Their sons included Hugh Robert Everard Earle, CMG, JP (1885–1970), who was a provincial commissioner in Kenya, and Edward Everard Earle, JP, DL (1870–1951), who adopted the surname Welby-Everard and served as vice-chairman (1930–39) and then chairman (1939–42) of the Holland Quarter Sessions, as well as high sheriff of Lincolnshire in 1935 and chairman of the Welland Catchment Board (1930–46); he married Gwladys Muriel Petra (d. 1946), daughter of Rev. G. W. Herbert, and their children included Major-General Sir Christopher Earle Welby-Everard, KBE, CB, DL (1909–1996).
- Frances Wilhelmina (d. 1858) married Lieutenant-Colonel John Reeve (d. 1897), of Leadenham House.
- Mary Elizabeth Welby (d. 1919) married twice: firstly, in 1860, to John Richards Homfray (d. 1882) of Penllyn Castle, Glamorganshire; and secondly, in 1893, to Colonel George Shirley Maxwell.
- Alice (d. 1915) married in 1860 to George Troyte Bullock (from 1852 Troyte-Bullock, from 1892 Troyte-Chafyn-Grove) of Zeals and North Coker House, who served as High Sheriff of Dorset in 1888.

== Member of Parliament ==
Welby was elected at the 1830 general election as a Member of Parliament for Grantham, and held the seat until he stood down from the House of Commons at the 1857 general election.

He was appointed High Sheriff of Lincolnshire for 1860–61.

Parliament of the United Kingdom
Preceded by Frederick Tollemache; Sir Montague Cholmeley, Bt	Member of Parliament for Grantham; 1830 – 1857; With: Sir Montague Cholmeley, Bt to 1831; James Hughes 1831–32; Algernon Gray Tollemache 1832–37; Frederick Tollemache 1837–52; Lord Montagu Graham 1852–57	Succeeded by William Earle Welby; Frederick Tollemache
Baronetage of the United Kingdom
Preceded by William Earle Welby	Baronet (of Denton Manor); 1852–1875	Succeeded by William Welby-Gregory
