= Pubs and inns in Grantham =

Hostelries in Lincolnshire

The pubs and inns in Grantham reflect to a great extent the history of the town, soke, and Parliamentary constituency of Grantham, Lincolnshire, England.

== "Blue" pubs ==
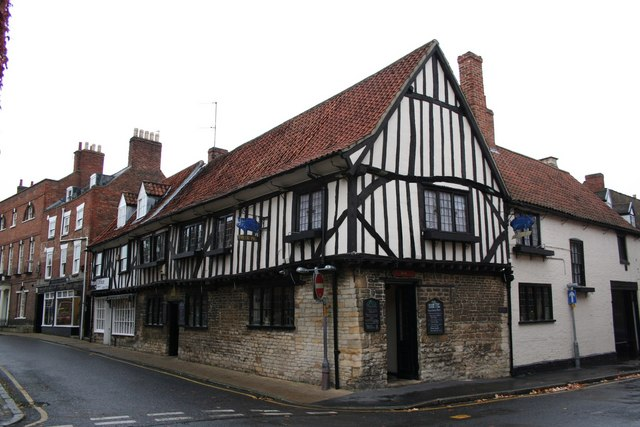
The Blue Pig pub, on the corner of Vine Street and Swinegate. The ground storey is stone-faced, with the upper floor, overhanging the lower, having an exposed timber frame. The timbers were exposed, by removing rendering that had previously covered them, in the early 1930s.

Grantham's various "blue" pubs are one example of this. The area has had, in its history, pubs named the Blue Pig, the Blue Lion, the Blue Horse, the Blue Dog, the Blue Bull, the Blue Cow, the Blue Ram, the Blue Sheep, the Blue Lamb, and (a single human amongst the animals) the Blue Man. (There is also a small street, Blue Gate.) The Blue Bull, Cow, Dog, and Fox are/were all in Colsterworth, which was part of Grantham soke when it was enclosed in 1805–1808. The Blue Pig, Ram, and Man are/were in Grantham proper.

These names have their roots in a 19th-century political rivalry over the membership of Parliament for the constituency of Grantham, between the Manners family (the Duke of Rutland from Belvoir Castle) and the Brownlow family (from Belton House). Pubs in the constituency declared political allegiances, and acted as gathering places for supporters of political factions. Where a person drank declared that person's political views.

The Manners family were Whigs and chose blue as their colour. They bought several pubs and inns in the constituency, and added "blue" to their names. People could drink "blue ale" in the "blue" pubs, which was an inducement to vote for Whig candidates in the parliamentary elections.

Grantham also once had a Manners Arms, named after William Manners, Baronet, which no longer exists. The Huntingtower Arms in Grantham was also named after him. No pub was named after his son Frederick Tollemache, Liberal member of Parliament for the constituency, by the Manners family, although a statue to him exists in Grantham town. However, in the 20th century the building of the defunct Co-operative department store in the town (in St Catherine's Road) was taken over by the Wetherspoons franchise and turned into a public house, The Tollemache.

The constituency of Grantham was a pocket borough, whose elections were controlled by its landowners. There was no secret ballot, and voters were paid for casting their votes. Since the Restoration in 1660 these landowners had been Lord Brownlow and the Duke of Rutland, and their descendants. In 1802, William Manners owned nearly all of the houses, and pubs and inns, in the borough. The 1802 election was fiercely contested by Manners, and after three days the results were:

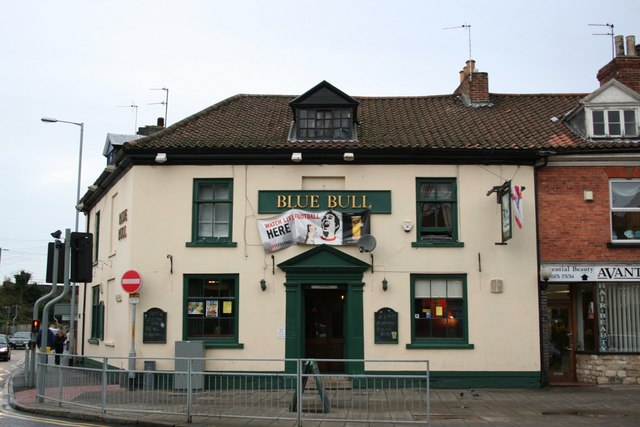
The Blue Bull Inn at 64–65 Westgate

Grantham election, 1802
Candidate	votes
Sir William Earl Welby	434
Edward Thornton, Esq.	434
John Manners, Esq.	406
Hon. A. B. Danvers	389

Welby (who took the seat) and Thornton were supported by Lord Brownlow and the Duke of Rutland. Manners and Danvers were supported by William Manners. Before this election, voters had been paid two guineas per candidate for their votes. With this election, the price rose to ten guineas per voter per candidate.

The following advertisement was published before the 1830 election in Grantham:

Grantham Election.

The BLUES of the last Election are informed, that they can shoot and fish, as hitherto, over the adjoining Manors of Grantham, Little Gonerby, Manthorpe, Somerby, Spittlegate, Houghton, and Walton, but over no other Blue Manors; that the can have the choice of 200 houses in Grantham, and of 200 Closes adjoining Grantham; and that as many as please can have, at this time, work at Buckminster, near Grantham.

The Blues are reminded, that at the last Election, in 1826, the Hon. FREDERICK TALMASH^{1} polled 563 votes, 280 of which were plumpers^{2}; that Mr. CHOLMELEY^{3} polled 338 votes, 37 of which were plumpers; and that the Hon. EDWARD CUST polled 312 votes, 99 of which were plumpers, who can still be brought in for Grantham, if he will cordially join the Blues on the day of Election, his brother owning by Kemp's map of the Borough 60 houses in Grantham, Welby's father only 4 houses, and Cholmeley neither house nor pig-sty within six miles of it.

Apply at any of the following Blue Inns at Grantham, viz. the George and Blue Boar, the Blue Ram, the Blue Lion, the Blue Bull, the Blue Horse, the Blue Sheep, the Blue Dog, the Blue Bell, the Blue Cow, the Blue Pig, and the Blue Boat.

- ^1 Frederick Tollemache
- ^2 A "plumper" here is a vote where the voter has cast only one of the two votes available to him.
- ^3 Sir Montague Cholmeley, 2nd Baronet

== The Angel Inn ==
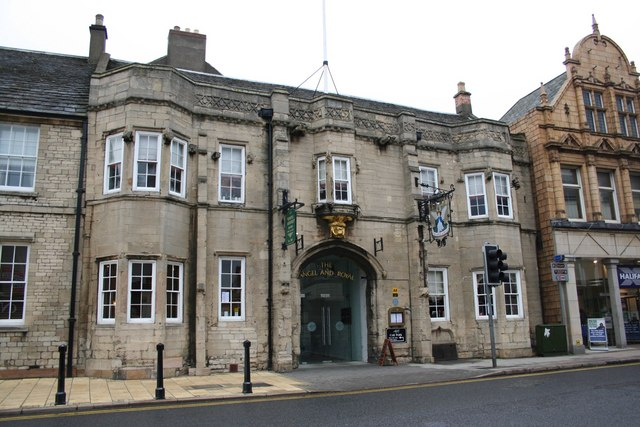
The front of what is now The Angel and Royal Hotel. Despite the many royal visits in previous centuries, the "and Royal" was only finally added to the name in 1866, when the inn was visited by the then Prince of Wales, later King Edward VII. La Chambre le Roi at the time of Richard III extended for the whole of the first floor of the Inn, with the two mullioned bay windows for both ground and first floors, that can be seen here, at each end of the room.

In 1812, Lord Brownlow sold his property in Grantham to William Manners, including another pub, The Angel Inn, which had taken its name from stone carvings of angels on the front of the building.

The gateway arch of the Angel Inn, as it stood in the 19th century, was older than the rest of the front of the building. On either side of the arch were carved heads of Edward the Third and of Queen Philippa his consort. These, with an oriel window above, can still be seen today. Also still to be seen today is the gold-painted carved wooden figure of an angel over the entrance, beneath the oriel. Such a wooden figure, dating as it does to earlier than the seventeenth century, is rare for an inn. The entrance dates to the Tudor period, as do portions of the courtyard buildings. Other rarities to have survived in the Inn include the stone twin-panel vaulting in the interior ceilings of the bay windows. The front of the building is built in ashlar, of local oolithic stone. The Angel thus lays claim to being the oldest surviving Inn in England, sitting on what was once the Great North Road.

It is widely held that the Angel Inn was once a "commandery of the Knights Templar" (as reported in both White's 1846 History, gazetteer, and directory of Leicestershire and Allen's 1834 History of the county of Lincoln). However, the Reverend B. Street, curate of Grantham, stated in 1857 after his own investigations that "such is not the case". "I have read a document drawn up at Grantham, October 15, 1291," he wrote, "which certainly refers to the property, as belonging to the Knights Templars, but not as being a Preceptory of the Order.".

According to Street, the Angel Inn was Knights Templars property that was a hostelry for travellers and pilgrims. It was seized from the Templars, by the Sheriff of Lincolnshire, on 7 January 1308, in accordance with the following writ issued by King Edward the Second on 15 December 1307:

The King is about to proceed to parts beyond the seas for a short time. During his absence, he wishes certain matters relative to the peace of the kingdom to be explained to the Sheriff in a writ which the Sheriff will shortly receive. The Sheriff of Lincolnshire is therefore commanded to warn twelve discreet and trustworthy men, Knights or others, upon whose fidelity he can best rely, to meet him at Lincoln, on the 7th of January 1308, very early in the mornin; at which place and time the Sheriff is to be in person to do and perform what shall be contained in the said write, and also what he shall be directed to do by the bearer of it.

The second writ, born to the Sheriff by one of the King's Clerks of Council, which the Sheriff and the twelve men all had to swear to follow before being told its contents, was:

On Wednesday, 10th January, 1308, very early in the morning, the Sheriff of Lincoln, with the twelve men summoned and sworn, is to attach and arrest all the Knights Templars in his Bailiwick. All their lands, goods, tenements, chattels, charters, writings, and muniments, are to be seized and secured, and an inventory of them made, in the presence of the Custos of the Templar's house, and two witnesses. The Knights are to be kept in safe custody, but not in a straight or loathsome prison; and to be maintained out of the revenues of the Order.

Street believes that the Angel Inn, having been seized by the king, probably then became the property of the Knights Hospitallers. He bases this conclusion on the presence of the arms of the Hospitallers on the East window of Grantham church in 1662 (as recorded by Gervase Holles in Notes of Arms in Grantham Church, a manuscript held in the British Museum), in place of the arms of the Templars that had been there, indicating that the Templars' property in Grantham had passed to the Hospitallers.

Street also records the Angel Inn as having been used to hold court by Kings John (on 23 February 1213) and Richard the Third (on 19 October 1483). He also states that it was probably used by King Charles the First on 17 May 1622.

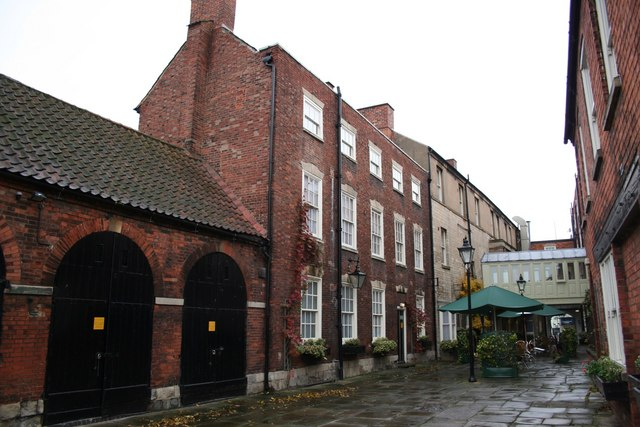
The courtyard and range of the Angel and Royal, pictured here, are 18th-century additions to the mediæval Inn, replacing portions of the earlier Inn, such as external stairways, some galleries, barns to the rear, and a timber-built wing to the right of the front.

At the time of Richard III, the large room over the gateway of the Angel Inn was called La Chambre le Roi (the King's Chamber). Street concluded that this room's name came from Norman French, and probably from the visit to Grantham that John paid in 1213 (during which he delivered Letters Patent at Grantham granting the release of Lucian of Arquill). The evidence for Richard III's visit he took from Rymer's Fædera, as quoted in Halstead's History of Richard the Third, which said that the Great Seal, used for issuing a death warrant, was delivered to the king by messenger "in a chamber called the King's chamber in the Angel Inn, in the presence of the Bishops of Worcester, Durham, St David's, and St Asaph, and of the Earls of Northumberland and Huntingdon, and of Sir Thomas Stanley".

As is still recorded today on the charity board of Grantham church (in the ringing chamber of the church's bell tower), in 1706 a Mr. Michael Sullivan left a benefaction to the church for a sermon against drunkenness, to be paid by the Angel Inn. As recorded in the Grantham Register the benefaction was:

Item, I give to the alderman of Grantham and his successor for ever, a rent charge of 40 shillings a year to be paid out of the Angel Inn in Grantham aforesaid every Michaelmas day, upon this trust, that he procure some able divine to preach a sermon in the afternoon the Sunday after every alderman's choice for ever, wherein the subject shall be chiefly against drunkenness and then pay the preacher 40 shillings for the same, I looking upon that sin to be the inlet of almost all others.

== The Beehive ==
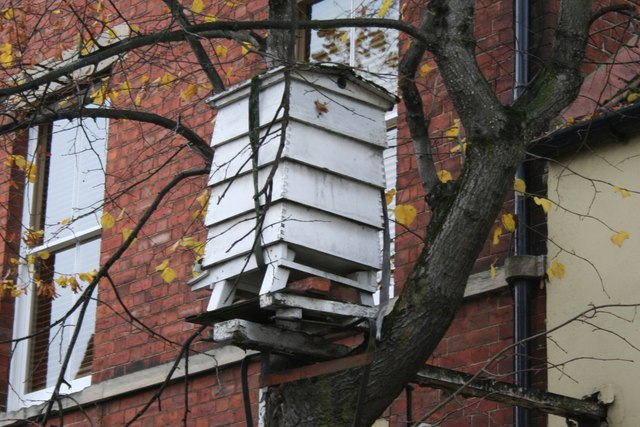
The pub sign of The Beehive, at 10 Castlegate

The Beehive public house in Grantham sports a real bee hive as its pub sign. The hive is in a tree that grows directly in front of the pub. Beneath the hive is a plaque, bearing the following poem:

Stop Traveller This wonderous sign explore
And say, when thou hast viewed it o'er and o'er
Now Grantham, now two rarities are thine:
A lofty steeple and a living sign.

The "lofty steeple" is that of the parish church of St Wulfram, which is only a few hundred metres from the pub.

== Other pubs ==
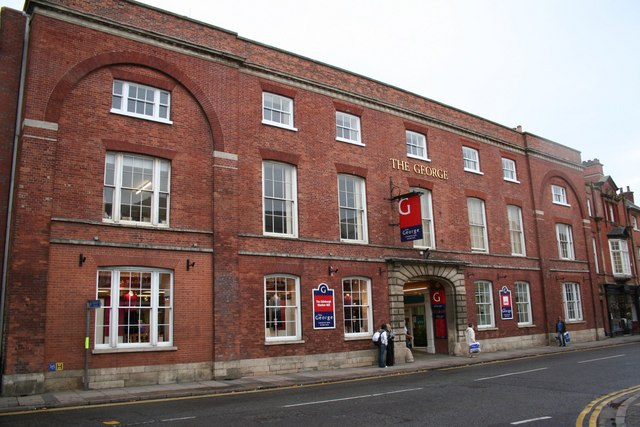
The George at Grantham was built in 1780 and is an example of Georgian architecture of the time, including the lofty arched entryway for coaches that was used for such inns starting in 1760. The date carved on the keystone of the central entranceway is 1789.

Other present and past pubs in Grantham include:

- Edward granted Le George to Cecily Neville, Duchess of York on 1 June 1461. In her will of April 1495, she in turn bequeathed it to "Dame Jane Pesemershe, widow" for her lifetime. Le George reverted to the Crown in 1606, at that time known as the Queen's Inn, called Le George.
- The George, built in 1780, is possibly related to a hospitium called Le George, presented by King Edward the Fourth to his mother, which was demolished in 1780.
- The George, where Charles Dickens and Hablot Knight Browne stayed on 30 January 1838 on their way to Yorkshire, where they were researching Nicholas Nickleby.
- The Chequers Inn in Butchers Row, demolished in the 1880s, only to be replaced by a pub of the same name.
- Artichoke House on Swinegate, a former pub.
- The Crown and Anchor, a couple of doors down from the Blue Pig, that closed in 1936.
- The Horse and Jockey, near Welby Street, demolished in the 1950s and now the site of the Horse and Jockey Yard, a park named after the pub.
- Gravity, a pub formerly called the Hogshead, in a building that used to be the location of a Woolworths store in the 1960s.
- The Plough Inn, on Welby street, which closed in 1958 and was demolished in 1982.
- The Durham Ox, on the corner of Welby Street and Wharf Road, which ceased to be a pub in 1961, and was demolished in order to build the Isaac Newton Centre in 1983.
- The Royal Queen, Belton Lane.

== See also ==
- List of pub topics
