= George Manners, 7th Earl of Rutland =

English landowner and politician

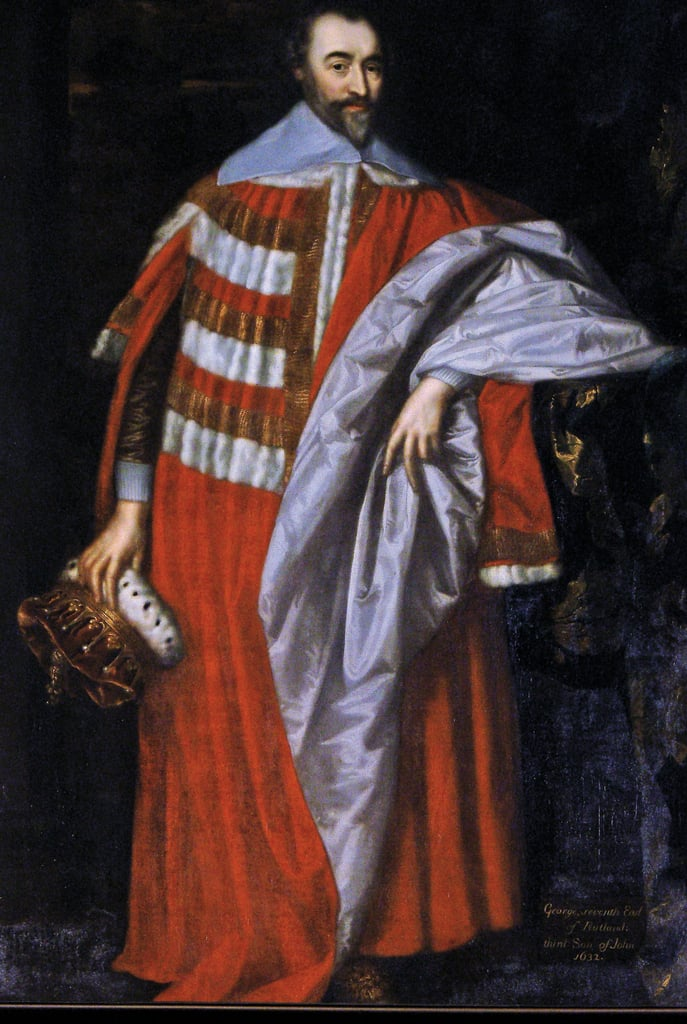
George Manners, 7th Earl of Rutland

George Manners, 7th Earl of Rutland (1580 – 29 March 1641) of Fulbeck Hall, Lincolnshire was an English landowner and politician who sat in the House of Commons between 1604 and 1626. He inherited a peerage as Earl of Rutland in 1632.

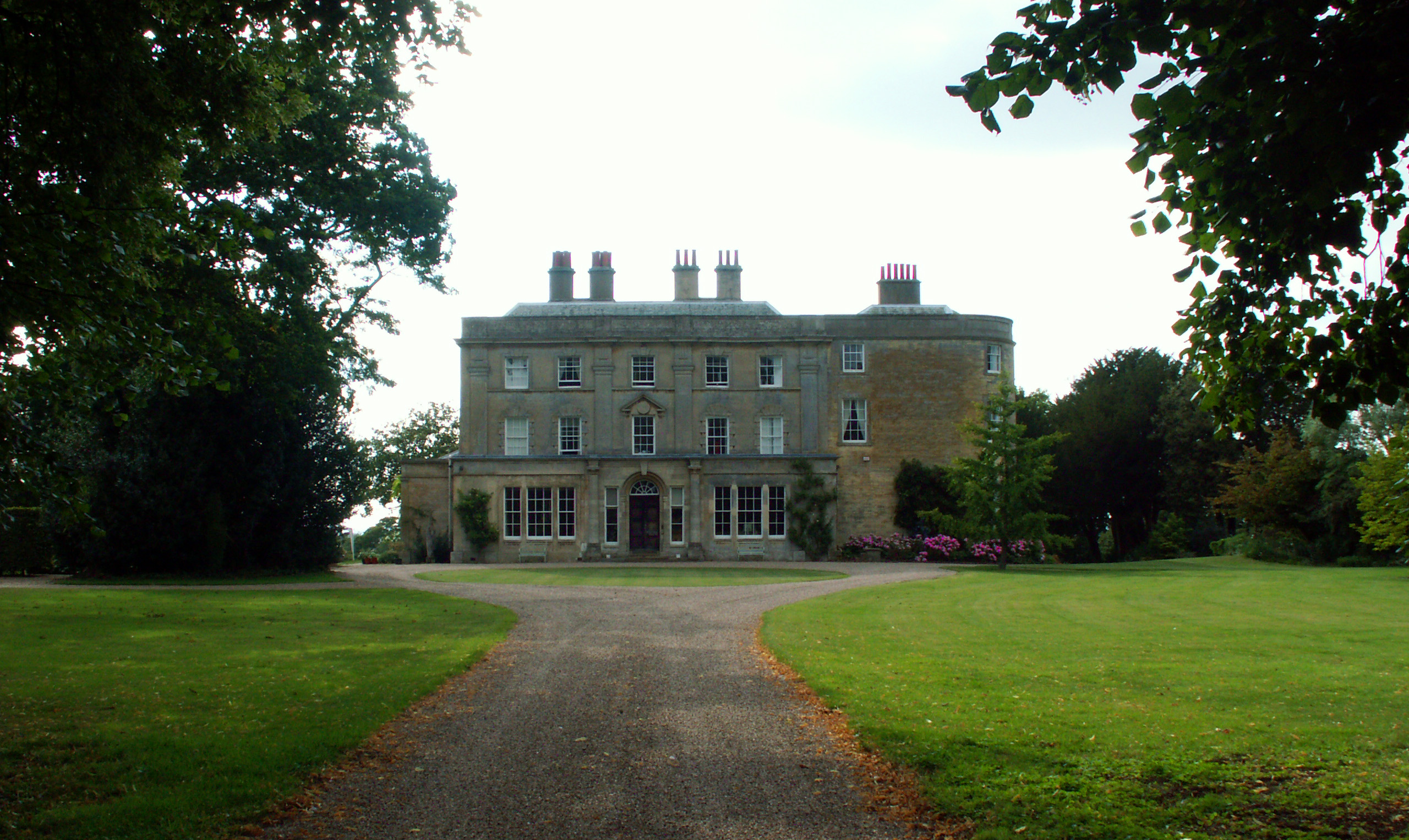
Fulbeck Hall, Lincolnshire

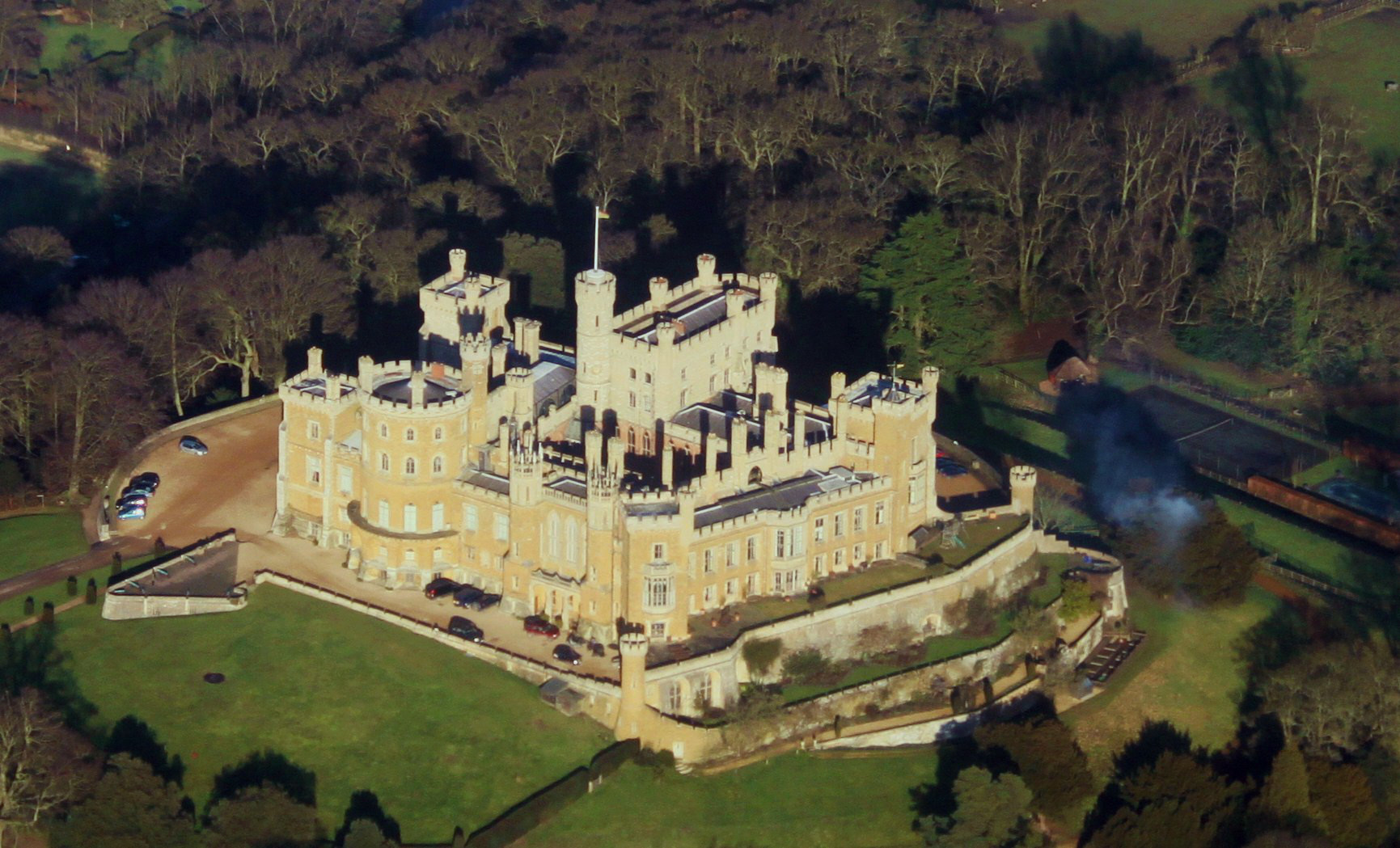
Belvoir Castle. Leicestershire

Manners was the son of John Manners, 4th Earl of Rutland and his wife Elizabeth Charlton, daughter of Francis Charlton of Apley Castle. He was elected Member of Parliament (MP) for Grantham in 1604. He was elected MP for Lincolnshire in 1614 for the Addled Parliament and in 1621. In 1624 he was elected MP for Stamford again for the Happy Parliament, and was re-elected in 1625 for the Useless Parliament.

He inherited the peerage as Earl of Rutland on the death of his brother Francis in 1632, which brought him Belvoir Castle, in favour of which he left Fulbeck Hall.

Manners died in 1641, and his titles were passed to his second cousin, John Manners.

Manners married Frances Cary, daughter of Sir Edward Cary and Katherine Knyvett, on 3 March 1605.

Parliament of England
Preceded by Oliver Manners; Thomas Horsman	Member of Parliament for Grantham; 1604–1611; With: Sir Thomas Horsman	Succeeded by Sir George Reynell; Richard Tufton
Preceded by John Sheffield; Sir Valentine Browne	Member of Parliament for Lincolnshire; 1614–1622; With: Sir Peregrine Bertie; Sir Thomas Grantham	Succeeded by Sir Thomas Grantham; Montagu Bertie
Preceded by Sir William Airmine; Sir Clement Cotterell	Member of Parliament for Grantham; 1624–1625; With: Sir Clement Cotterell; Sir William Airmine	Succeeded by John Wingfield; Edward Stirmin
Peerage of England
Preceded by Francis Manners	Earl of Rutland; 1632–1641	Succeeded by John Manners
