= Frank Hall =

Frank Hall may refer to:

- Frank Hall (broadcaster) (1921–1995), Irish television personality
- Frank Hall (drummer) (born 1949), English drummer
- Frank Hall (sailor) (born 1944), Canadian athlete
- Frank Hall (sport shooter) (1865–1939), American sport shooter
- Frank Hall (trade unionist) (1860–1927), English trade unionist
- Franklin P. Hall (1938–2015), known as Frank, minority leader of the Virginia House of Delegates
- Frank Haven Hall (1841–1911), American educator
- Frank H. Hall (judge) (1890–1964), associate justice of the Colorado Supreme Court
- Frank J. Hall (1844–1925), American politician and Lieutenant Governor of Indiana
- Frank P. Hall (1870–1926), American judge and Justice of the Tennessee Supreme Court
- Frank S. Hall (Tennessee politician) (1890–1958), American politician from Tennessee
- Frank S. Hall (New York politician) (1853–1928), member of the New York State Assembly
- Frank Hall Standish (1799–1840), English book and art collector

== See also ==
- Frank A. Hall House, Westfield, Chautauqua County, New York
- Francis Hall (disambiguation)
- Franklin Hall (disambiguation)
