= Francis Hall =

Francis Hall may refer to:

- Francis Hall, alias of the Jesuit priest Francis Line (1595–1675)
- Francis Hall (Japan) (1822–1902), American businessman in Japan
- Francis Hall (MP) (died 1534), English Member of Parliament for Grantham
- Francis B. Hall (1827–1903), Union Army soldier
- Francis de Havilland Hall (1847–1929), English physician
- Frances Elliott Mann Hall (1853–1935), American teacher
- Francis Joseph Hall (1857–1932), American Episcopal theologian
- Francis Richard Hall (1862–1939), Australian architect
- Francis William Hall (1871–?), lawyer and political figure in Ontario
- Francis Hall (priest) (fl. 1795–1803), Anglican priest in Ireland
- Francis George Hall (1860–1901), British administrator in East Africa
- Francis Hall, engineer for the Shubenacadie Canal

== See also ==
- Frank Hall (disambiguation)
