= 1889 Kesteven County Council election =

Election in England

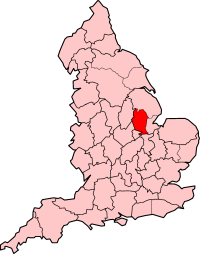
The administrative county of Kesteven (1889–1974), shown within England.

The first elections to Kesteven County Council were held on Thursday, 17 January 1889. Kesteven was one of three divisions of the historic county of Lincolnshire in England; it consisted of the ancient wapentakes (or hundreds) of Aswardhurn, Aveland, Beltisloe, Boothby Graffoe, Flaxwell, Langoe, Loveden, Ness, and Winnibriggs and Threo. The Local Government Act 1888 established Kesteven as an administrative county, governed by a Council; elections were held every three years from 1889, until it was abolished by the Local Government Act 1972, which established Lincolnshire County Council in its place.

The forty-six electoral divisions of the new Council were outlined in December 1888. All but two returned one candidate: Sleaford and Quarrington and Bourne and Morton returned two each. The town of Grantham was represented across seven divisions, while Stamford had four. Twenty-one candidates (including both for Sleaford) were returned unopposed. The remainder were informed of the result on the day after polling. Votes were counted in one of the court rooms in Lincoln; the Sheriff of Lincolnshire, A. S. Leslie-Melville, was the presiding officer, while R. A. Stephens was his deputy for Kesteven.

== Results by division ==
=== Ancaster ===
Ancaster
Party	Candidate	Votes	%	±%
	William Avery	180		
	Henry Smith BA	128		
	Edmund Lucas-Calcraft JP	35		
Turnout				

=== Barrowby ===
Barrowby
Party	Candidate	Votes	%	±%
	Sir W. E. Welby-Gregory Bt JP	NA	NA	

=== Bassingham ===
Bassingham
Party	Candidate	Votes	%	±%
	The Viscount St Vincent JP	218		
	William Brocklebank	168		
Turnout				

=== Bennington ===
Bennington
Party	Candidate	Votes	%	±%
	William Hutchinson	258		
	John Earle Welby JP	206		
Turnout				

=== Billingborough ===
Billingborough
Party	Candidate	Votes	%	±%
	Captain Henry Smith JP	207		
	Edward John Grummitt	246		

=== Billinghay ===
Billinghay
Party	Candidate	Votes	%	±%
	J. D. Bowling	NA	NA	

=== Bourne and Morton ===
Bourne and Morton
Party	Candidate	Votes	%	±%
	William Robert Wherry	578		
	John Derry	527		
	Christopher Gilbert Peacock JP	309		
	Thomas Lawrence	204		
Turnout				

- = Two seats

=== Bracebridge ===
Bracebridge
Party	Candidate	Votes	%	±%
	W. J. Warrener	NA	NA	

=== Branston ===
Branston
Party	Candidate	Votes	%	±%
	E. J. Howard	NA	NA	

=== Bytham ===
Bytham
Party	Candidate	Votes	%	±%
	Augustus Charles Johnson JP	180		
	William Hayes	160		
Turnout				

=== Caythorpe ===
Caythorpe
Party	Candidate	Votes	%	±%
	Colonel F. Fane JP	NA	NA	

=== Claypole ===
Claypole
Party	Candidate	Votes	%	±%
	George Nevile JP	NA	NA	

=== Colsterworth ===
Colsterworth
Party	Candidate	Votes	%	±%
	Eli Crabtree	250		
	Robert Heathcote JP	139		

=== Corby ===
Corby
Party	Candidate	Votes	%	±%
	The Lord Willoughby de Eresby JP	NA	NA	

=== Deeping ===
Deeping
Party	Candidate	Votes	%	±%
	W. Holland JP	NA	NA	

=== Gonerby ===
Gonerby
Party	Candidate	Votes	%	±%
	Thomas Newton	205		
	Thomas Pask	188		
Turnout				

=== Grantham no. 1 ===
Grantham no. 1
Party	Candidate	Votes	%	±%
	John Bailey	212		
	John Basker	102		
Turnout				

=== Grantham no. 2 ===
Grantham no. 2
Party	Candidate	Votes	%	±%
	G. S. Hannett	NA	NA	

=== Grantham no. 3 ===
Grantham no. 3
Party	Candidate	Votes	%	±%
	A. Hutchinson	NA	NA	

=== Grantham no. 4 ===
Grantham no. 4
Party	Candidate	Votes	%	±%
	Edward Staveley Harding	294		
	William Fillingham	86		
Turnout				

=== Grantham no. 5 ===
Grantham no. 5
Party	Candidate	Votes	%	±%
	W. L. Wand	NA	NA	

=== Grantham no. 6 ===
Grantham no. 6
Party	Candidate	Votes	%	±%
	J. W. Martin	NA	NA	

=== Grantham no. 7 ===
Grantham no. 7
Party	Candidate	Votes	%	±%
	W. B. Harrison	NA	NA	

=== Heckington ===
Heckington
Party	Candidate	Votes	%	±%
	James Hubbard	204		
	Bruce Tomlinson	148		
	Samuel Lamb	21		
Turnout				

=== Heighington ===
Heighington
Party	Candidate	Votes	%	±%
	C. C. Sibthorpe	NA	NA	

=== Helpringham ===
Helpringham
Party	Candidate	Votes	%	±%
	Edward Clarkson Rowe	198		
	George Ranyard Lee	185		
Turnout				

=== Kyme ===
Kyme
Party	Candidate	Votes	%	±%
	The Earl of Winchelsea and Nottingham JP	NA	NA	

=== Martin ===
Martin
Party	Candidate	Votes	%	±%
	John Hague Copping	264		
	William Bilton Harris	91		
Turnout				

=== Metheringham ===
Metheringham
Party	Candidate	Votes	%	±%
	William Shearburn Fox	194		
	William Dundas Gilpim-Brown	187		
Turnout				

=== Navenby ===
Navenby
Party	Candidate	Votes	%	±%
	Major Arthur Cecil Tempest JP	180		
	Charles Edward Marfleet	143		
Turnout				

=== Osbournby ===
Osbournby
Party	Candidate	Votes	%	±%
	Thomas Arthur Robert Heathcote JP	220		
	Seth Ellis Dean Jr	166		
Turnout				

=== Ponton ===
Ponton
Party	Candidate	Votes	%	±%
	Sir H. A. H. Cholmeley Bt JP	NA	NA	

=== Rippingale ===
Rippingale
Party	Candidate	Votes	%	±%
	William Bacon	227		
	Rev. William Wright Layng	94		
Turnout				

=== Ropsley ===
Ropsley
Party	Candidate	Votes	%	±%
	Captain Cecil Thorold JP	216		
	William Jackson	168		
Turnout				

=== Ruskington ===
Ruskington
Party	Candidate	Votes	%	±%
	Captain Neville Henry Reeve JP	255		
	Samuel Pattinson	183		
Turnout				

=== Skellingthorpe ===
Skillingthorpe
Party	Candidate	Votes	%	±%
	G. E. Jarvis JP	NA	NA	

=== Sleaford and Quarrington ===
Sleaford and Quarrington*
Party	Candidate	Votes	%	±%
	G. H. W. Hervey JP	NA	NA	
	Charles Sharpe	NA	NA	

- = Two seats

=== Stamford (All Saints) ===
Stamford (Stamford All Saints)
Party	Candidate	Votes	%	±%
	Charles Chapman	271		
	Herbert Hart	255		
Turnout				

=== Stamford (St George's) ===
Stamford (St George's)
Party	Candidate	Votes	%	±%
	John Seaton Loweth	192		
	Valentine Stapleton	155		
Turnout				

=== Stamford (St Michael's and St John's) ===
Stamford (St Michael's and St John's)
Party	Candidate	Votes	%	±%
	Orlando Edmonds	132		
	Henry Knott JP	117		
Turnout				

=== Stamford (St Martin's and St Mary's) ===
Stamford (St Martin's and St Mary's)
Party	Candidate	Votes	%	±%
	Charles Handson	144		
	William Jonathan Bettle	62		
Turnout				

=== Thurlby ===
Thurlby
Party	Candidate	Votes	%	±%
	Robert Peasgood	203		
	Charles Whattof	177		
Turnout				

=== Uffington ===
Uffington
Party	Candidate	Votes	%	±%
	The Lord Kesteven JP	283		
	William Cross	62		
Turnout				

=== Waddington ===
Waddington
Party	Candidate	Votes	%	±%
	R. G. Ellison JP	NA	NA	

=== Wellingore ===
Wellingore
Party	Candidate	Votes	%	±%
	Richard Newcombe Morley	192		
	Richard Blankley Burrows	155		
Turnout				

=== Wilsford ===
Wilsford
Party	Candidate	Votes	%	±%
	Colonel M. Willson JP	NA	NA	

== By-elections in February 1889 ==
The Council held its first meeting on 31 January, where it elected a Chairman and sixteen aldermen. If a councillor were elected an alderman, he had to forfeit his seat. Eleven members of the council were elected to the aldermanic bench, which meant that their seats became vacant, triggering by-elections. Colonel Willson, who had been returned for Wilsford at the first round of elections, was disqualified because he held a paid commission in the armed forces; this triggered a by-election. All twelve were held on 18 February; four candidates stood unopposed.

=== Grantham no. 2 ===
Grantham no. 2
Party	Candidate	Votes	%	±%
Liberal	William Scoffield	198		
Conservative	Alfred Childs	184		
Turnout		382		

=== Barrowby ===
Barrowby
Party	Candidate	Votes	%	±%
Conservative	Richard Welborn	245		
Liberal	Henry Bowman	168		
Turnout		413		

=== Ponton ===
Ponton
Party	Candidate	Votes	%	±%
	R. C. Newton	267		
	Robert Wyles	102		
Turnout				

=== Corby ===
Corby
Party	Candidate	Votes	%	±%
	Dr J. E. Collingwood	205		
	F. Searson	128		
Turnout				

=== Sleaford ===
Sleaford
Party	Candidate	Votes	%	±%
	A. L. Jessop	510		
	G. R. Lee	289		
Turnout				

=== Wilsford ===
Wilsford
Party	Candidate	Votes	%	±%
	G. H. Peake	209		
	F. Ward	193		
Turnout				

=== Bourne ===
Bourne
Party	Candidate	Votes	%	±%
Conservative	James Measures	442		
Liberal	John Cappitt	410		
Turnout		852		

=== Helpringham ===
Helpringham
Party	Candidate	Votes	%	±%
Conservative	Joseph Senior Barber	197		
Liberal	Charles Edward Harris	147		
	Charles Hardstaffe Read	37		
Turnout		381		

=== Billingborough ===
Billingborough
Party	Candidate	Votes	%	±%
	E. J. Grummitt	NA	NA	

=== Branston ===
Branston
Party	Candidate	Votes	%	±%
	William Roberts	NA	NA	

=== Billinghay ===
Billinghay
Party	Candidate	Votes	%	±%
	J. Creasey	NA	NA	

=== Wellingore ===
Wellingore
Party	Candidate	Votes	%	±%
	Colonel Reave	NA	NA	
