= Sir John Thorold, 12th Baronet =

British Conservative Party politician

The Right Honourable Sir John Thorold, Bt DL

Member of Parliament for Grantham
- In office 1865–1868 Serving with William Earle Welby, Edmund Turnor
- Preceded by: Frederick James Tollemache; William Earle Welby
- Succeeded by: Frederick James Tollemache; Sir Hugh Cholmeley, Bt

Personal details
- Born: John Henry Thorold; 9 March 1842
- Died: 4 October 1922 (aged 80)
- Party: Conservative
- Spouse: Hon. Alexandrina Willoughby (m. 1869; died 1922)
- Children: 5
- Parent: Sir John Thorold, 11th Baronet

Sir John Henry Thorold, 12th Baronet DL (9 March 1842 – 4 October 1922) was a British Conservative Party politician.

== Early life ==
He was the eldest son of Sir John Thorold, 11th Baronet, and Elizabeth Frances Thoroton-Hildyard. Among his siblings were Montague George Thorold (who married the widow of the 6th Baron Rivers), Capt. Cecil Thorold of Boothby Hall, and Lt.-Col. Charles Cecil Hayford Thorold, who was killed in action during the Second Boer War.

His paternal grandparents were Sir John Thorold, 10th Baronet, and the former Mary Kent (a daughter of Sir Charles Kent, 1st Baronet). His maternal grandparents were Col. Thomas Blackborne Thoroton-Hildyard and the former Anne Catherine Whyte (niece and heiress of Sir Robert D'Arcy Hildyard, 4th Baronet). His maternal uncle was Thomas Thoroton-Hildyard, MP for South Nottinghamshire.

Upon the death of his father in 1866, he succeeded to the baronetcy and the family estates, including Syston Park.

== Career ==
He was elected at the 1865 general election as a Member of Parliament for the borough of Grantham in Lincolnshire, but did not stand again in 1868.

He was appointed High Sheriff of Lincolnshire for 1876 to 1877, and was a Deputy Lieutenant of the county.

== Personal life ==
On 3 February 1869, Sir John married Hon. Alexandrina Henrietta Matilda Willoughby (1845–1931), daughter of Henry Willoughby, 8th Baron Middleton and the former Julia Louisa Bosville (a daughter of Alexander William Robert Bosville, granddaughter of the 3rd Baron Macdonald of Slate and descendant of Prince William Henry, Duke of Gloucester and Edinburgh). Together, they had five children:

- Aline Thorold (1869–1951), who married Ernest James Wythes of Wood House, son of George Edward Wythes, in 1894.
- Sir John George Thorold, 13th Baronet (1870–1951), who died unmarried.
- Capt. Henry Cecil Thorold (1871–1902), who was killed in action during the Second Boer War.
- Sir James Ernest Thorold, 14th Baronet (1877–1965), who married Katharine Tindal-Atkinson, a daughter of Rev. W. R. Tindal-Atkinson, in 1902.
- Dorothy Marion Thorold (1878–1958), who married Hubert Edward Peter Dyke Acland, son of Commander Benjamin Dyke Acland, in 1912.

Sir John died on 4 October 1922 and was succeeded in the baronetcy by his eldest son, John.

=== Descendants ===
Through his youngest son James, he was a grandfather of the Sir Anthony Henry Thorold, 15th Baronet, the Royal Navy officer who served as Captain of HMS Dryad, was Commodore in Charge, Hong Kong, and served as High Sheriff of Lincolnshire.

Parliament of the United Kingdom
Preceded by Frederick James Tollemache; William Earle Welby	Member of Parliament for Grantham; 1865 – 1868; With: William Earle Welby to April 1868; Edmund Turnor from April 1868	Succeeded by Frederick James Tollemache; Sir Hugh Cholmeley, Bt
Baronetage of England
Preceded by John Charles Thorold	Baronet (of Marston); 1866–1922	Succeeded by John George Thorold
