= Mount Vernon Station Homestead =

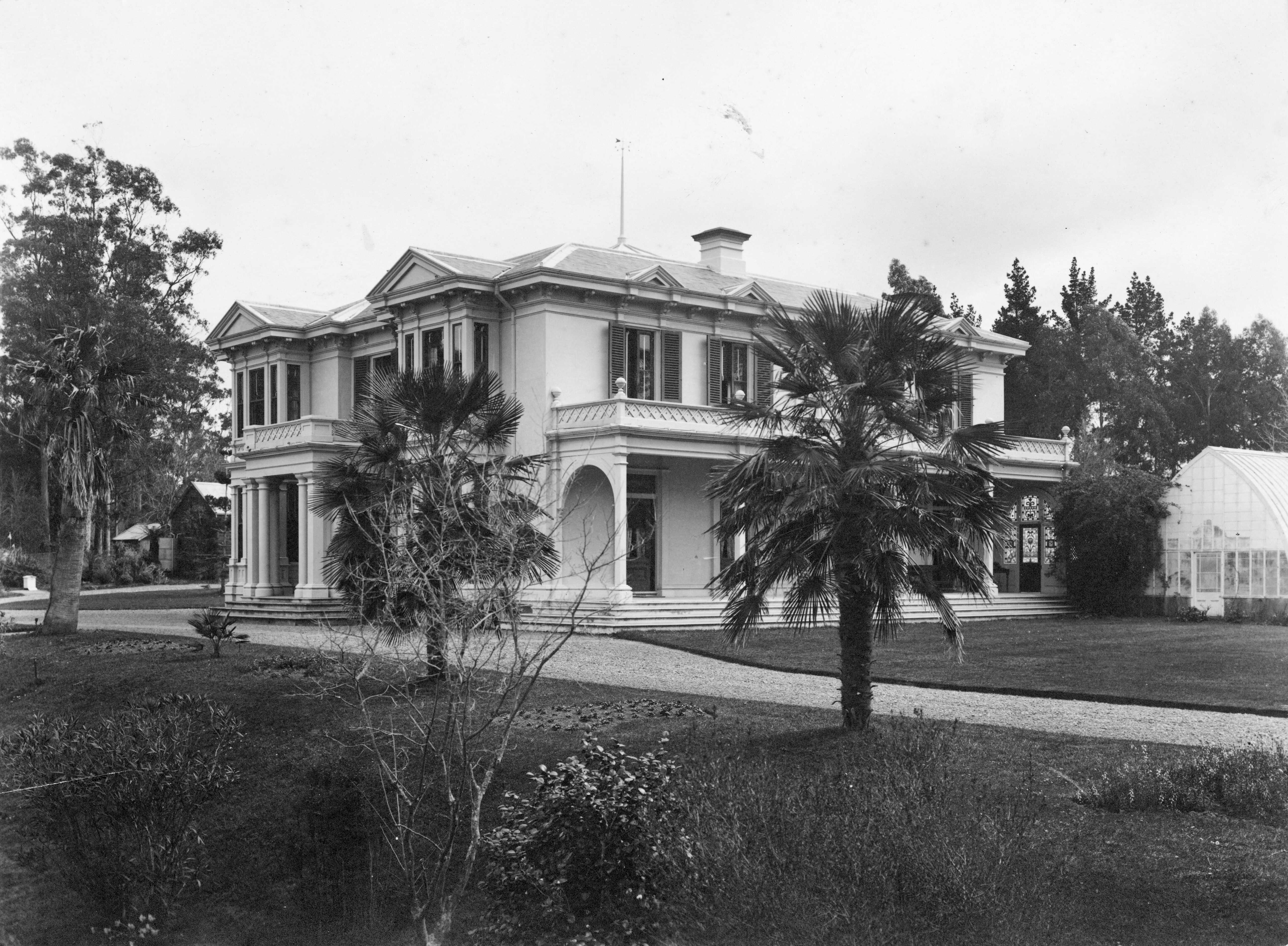
- Mount Vernon Station Homestead prior to being damaged in the 1931 earthquake

General information
- Type: Homestead
- Architectural style: American
- Location: Mount Vernon Station, 106 Lindsay Road, Waipukurau
- Named for: Mount Vernon
- Construction started: 1882
- Estimated completion: 1883
- Renovated: 1957

Design and construction
- Awards: NZIA 2021 Hawke's Bay Heritage

Heritage New Zealand – Category 1
- Designated: 2 July 1987
- Reference no.: 174

Mount Vernon Station Homestead is a historic homestead part of the Mount Vernon sheep station in New Zealand's Hawke's Bay region. The Mount Vernon Station Homestead was designed by architect Benjamin Smith for John Harding. Harding admired George Washington and asked Smith to design the home after Washington's Mount Vernon residence. The homestead is Smith's only surviving work and is registered as a category 1 building with Heritage New Zealand.

== Mount Vernon Station ==
John Harding established the Mount Vernon Station in 1853 after arriving in New Zealand in 1852. Harding was a Methodist and Temperance movement supporter who founded the New Zealand Alliance with Sir William Fox. During the 19th century the station had financial difficulties and was kept afloat with financing from Algernon Tollemache.

The station is located near Waipukurau north of the Tukituki River.

== Architect ==
Benjamin Smith was born c.1827 in Tipton, Staffordshire, England. Smith apprenticed to a Birmingham architect before practicing on his own in Dudley. In c.1860 Smith arrived in Victoria, Australia and practiced until September 1861 when he moved to New Zealand. Smith worked as an architect and surveyor in Dunedin until at least 1864 and by October 1865 was working in Wellington. He later worked around various places in the lower North Island such as Whanganui, Napier, and the Hawke's Bay. The Mount Vernon homestead is Smith's only surviving design.

== Homestead ==
The first homestead was constructed shortly after Harding's arrival in 1853 and was made from raupo. A wooden two-storeyed homestead was later constructed. After a visit to the United States in the 1870s Harding requested architect Benjamin Smith to design a building after George Washington's Mount Vernon residence — Harding had a great admiration for Washington. The current homestead started construction c.1882. On 8 March 1883 Smith was walking from Waipawa to Mount Vernon Station to supervise construction of the homestead but was hit by a train and died. The 1931 Hawke's Bay earthquake severely damaged the property and it fell into dessuetude, being scheduled for demolition in 1955. Peter Harding, great-grandson of John Harding, restored the building in 1957. The restoration included the demolition of the servants wing. The homestead was sold in 2017, it had been owned by six-generations of the Harding family. A later restoration won a New Zealand Institute of Architects award in the 2021 Hawke's Bay heritage category.

Mount Vernon Station Homestead is a large two-storey double bay villa, with domestic American architectural influence. This influence is from the request of Harding, who requested Smith to design the building after George Washington's residence. The homestead features bay windows, a porte-cochère, verandah, and balcony. The interior has timber panelling and a kauri staircase.

The homestead is located amongst a grove of exotic trees, including chilca trees. The basement houses a museum about the Harding family.
