= Christopher Welby-Everard =

British Army officer and Nigerian Army commander

Major-General Sir Christopher Welby-Everard KBE CB DL
- Born: Christopher Earle Welby-Everard; 9 August 1909; Spalding, Lincolnshire, England
- Died: 10 May 1996 (aged 86); Sleaford, Lincolnshire, England
- Military career
- Allegiance: United Kingdom
- Branch: British Army
- Service years: 1932–1965
- Rank: Major-General
- Nickname: Chris
- Service number: 52445
- Unit: Lincolnshire Regiment
- Commands: 2nd Battalion, Lincolnshire Regiment; 1st Battalion, Royal Lincolnshire Regiment; 157th (Lowland) Infantry Brigade; GOC, Nigerian Army
- Conflicts: Arab Revolt in Palestine; World War II
- Awards: Knight Commander of the Order of the British Empire; Companion of the Order of the Bath; Mentioned in despatches

Major-General Sir Christopher Earle Welby-Everard KBE CB DL (9 August 1909 – 10 May 1996) was an aristocratic British Army officer who was the last serving as General Officer Commanding (GOC) of the Nigerian Army.

== Early life ==
Born in 1909 at Gosberton House near Spalding, Lincolnshire, the youngest son of Edward Everard Earle Welby-Everard JP DL and a great-grandson of Sir Glynne Welby Bt MP, he attended Charterhouse School before going up to Corpus Christi College, Oxford (graduating BA 1932).

== Military career ==
On 30 April 1932 Welby-Everard was commissioned as a Second Lieutenant from the General List, Territorial Army into the Lincolnshire Regiment (with seniority backdated to 29 September 1930). Promoted Lieutenant on 29 September 1933, he served with the 2nd Battalion seeing action during the Arab Revolt in Palestine, then appointed Adjutant at the Regimental Depot in Lincoln from 1937 until 1939, being further promoted as Captain on 29 September 1938.

Between 1939 and 1943, during World War II, Welby-Everard became a staff officer and attended the Staff College, Camberley. On 11 March 1944 he was promoted to the acting rank of Lieutenant-Colonel and appointed as Commanding Officer (CO) of the 2nd Battalion, Lincolnshire Regiment, which was to participate in the invasion of Normandy. The battalion formed part the 9th Brigade of Major-General Tom Rennie's British 3rd Division and took part in the D-Day landings in June. Leading his battalion during the early stages of the Normandy Campaign, Welby-Everard served with distinction in Operation Charnwood, being wounded in July during Operation Goodwood. Appointed an Officer of the Order of the British Empire in 1945, he then joined the Staff of 49th (West Riding) Infantry Division before serving with Middle East Land Forces until September 1948.

Between 1949 and 1951, Welby-Everard was CO of the 1st Battalion, Royal Lincolnshire Regiment. From 1952 to 1954 he was Brigade Colonel at HQ Midland Brigade, promoted full Colonel on 31 December 1953. Welby-Everard was then appointed Commander of HQ Scottish Command, serving until 1957. Between 1957 and 1959 he was Brigadier General Staff at HQ British Army of the Rhine and then served as Chief of Staff to the Commander-in-Chief, Allied Forces, Northern Europe until October 1961. Promoted Major-General on 19 May 1959, he was appointed a Companion of the Order of the Bath in 1960. From 1962 to 1965 Welby-Everard was the General Officer Commanding the Nigerian Army; the last British officer to hold the role after Nigerian independence. Advanced as Knight Commander of the Most Excellent Order of the British Empire in the 1965 New Year Honours, he retired from active military service on 1 May 1965.

Appointed a Deputy Lieutenant for Lincolnshire in 1966, Welby-Everard served as High Sheriff of Lincolnshire for 1974/75.

== Personal life ==
In 1938 he married Sybil Juliet Wake Shorrock (died 1994), daughter and co-heiress of Guy Shorrock (1867–1941); General and Lady Welby-Everard had two sons:

- Peter Rodney Earle Welby-Everard JP (1942–2024), married 1972 Jennifer Frances, younger daughter of Lieutenant-Colonel Samuel Terence Cracroft Parsons-Smith (1911–2001) and Thea van Someren (1918–1996), of Wildhern, Hampshire, leaving issue.
- Hugh Earle Welby-Everard MBE (born 1944), married 1970 Virginia Gresley (died 1989), elder daughter of Major-General John Morris CB CBE DSO, having issue.

Sir Christopher was a member of MCC and played minor counties cricket for Lincolnshire from 1934 to 1938, as well as the Free Foresters.

Military offices
Preceded by Brigadier John Mackenzie	GOC Nigerian Army; 1963–1965	Succeeded by Major-General Johnson Aguiyi-Ironsi
