= Arthur Hall (English politician) =

English courtier and translator

Arthur Hall (1539–1605) was an English Member of Parliament, courtier and translator. According to J. E. Neale a "reprobate", who gained notoriety by his excesses, he was several times in serious trouble with Parliament itself, and among the accusations in a privilege case was his attitude to Magna Carta. What were his incidental attacks on the antiquity of the institution were taken seriously, a generation later, by Sir Edward Coke, as undermining Parliament by "derogation". He produced the first substantial translation of the Iliad into English.

== Life ==
He was born the son of Francis Hall who was surveyor of Calais. He was most likely born in Calais where his father's principal estates were, and where the family lived. On his father's death when he was 12 or 13, he became a ward of Sir William Cecil, and was brought up in the household with Thomas Cecil. He seems to have studied for a short time at St. John's College, Cambridge, but took no degree. Roger Ascham encouraged him in his studies, and about 1563 he began a translation of Homer into English. Subsequently, he travelled in Italy and southeastern Europe. In January 1569 he returned to England from Constantinople.

On 2 April 1571 he was elected M.P. for Grantham, and on 8 May 1572 was returned again for the same constituency to the parliament which sat till 1583. Nine days after his second election the House of Commons ordered him to answer at the bar of the house a charge of having made lewd speeches both within and without the house. Witnesses were directed to meet at Westminster, and deliver their testimony to the speaker in writing. On 19 May Hall was brought by the serjeant-at-arms to the bar. He apologised for his conduct, and was discharged after the speaker had reprimanded him.

In the following year he was in more serious trouble. He was playing cards in Lothbury (16 December 1573), when he quarrelled over the game with one of his companions, Melchisedech Mallory. A temporary truce was patched up, but the quarrel soon broke out with renewed violence. According to Mallory, Hall declined to fight; but on 30 June 1574 a serious affray between the disputants and their followers took place at a tavern near Fleet Bridge, and in November Edward Smalley, and other of Hall's servants, attacked and wounded Mallory in St. Paul's Churchyard. Mallory obtained a verdict in a civil action against Smalley, and Hall began a libel suit against Mallory. But while the suit was pending, and before Smalley had paid the damages, Mallory died on 18 September 1575. Mallory's executor failing to receive the damages from Smalley caused him to be arrested. As the servant of a member of parliament, he claimed immunity from arrest, and the House of Commons ordered his discharge, at the same time directing the serjeant-at-arms to rearrest him, on the ground that he was fraudulently seeking to avoid the payment of a just debt A bill was introduced, but was soon dropped, providing that Hall should pay up, and be disabled for ever from sitting in parliament. Finally, Smalley and Matthew Kirtleton were committed to the Tower of London for a month by order of the house, and thenceforward until Smalley gave security for the payment.

Hall printed a long account of the quarrel with Mallory, in the form of a letter dated from London, 19 May 1576, from 'one F. A. . . .to his very friend L. B., being in Italy.' Henry Bynneman printed about a hundred copies, but Hall only distributed fourteen. Hall was severe on the action of Sir Robert Bell, the speaker, and other members of parliament. Parliament was in recess at the date of the publication, and did not resume its sittings till January 1581. In 1580 the privy council summoned Hall before it, and he apologised for the tone of his book, but still kept a few copies in circulation. On 16 January 1581 Thomas Norton, M.P., at the opening of the new session of parliament, brought the offensive work to the notice of the house. A committee was appointed to examine Hall, Bynneman, and others, but Hall's answers to the committee proved unsatisfactory, and on 14 February 1581 he was for a second time summoned to the bar of the house. He declined to comment on the subject-matter of the book, but in general terms acknowledged his error, and asked for pardon. By a unanimous vote he was committed to the Tower for six months, or until he should make a satisfactory retraction; was ordered to pay a fine to the queen of five hundred marks, and was expelled from the house for the present parliament. A new writ was issued for Grantham, and the book was condemned by a resolution of the house as a slanderous libel. The session closed on 18 March, but Hall does not appear to have been released till the dissolution of parliament, 9 April 1583. On 23 July 1582 he begged Lord Burghley to obtain permission for him to study in a foreign university.

On 27 November 1585 Hall is said to have been elected for a third time M.P. for Grantham; but on 12 December notice was given to the House of Commons that he had not attended during the session. To the parliament returned in October 1586 he was not re-elected, but he brought an action against the borough of Grantham for arrears of wages due to him as member in an earlier parliament. On 2 December 1586 Hall's claim was referred to a committee of the House of Commons, and he agreed to forego the demand on 21 March 1587.

Hall was in trouble again in 1588. He was in the Fleet Prison as early as June, and in October he wrote to Burghley from prison regretting that he had left Burghley's service, and that the queen was incensed against him. He intended (he said) to remove himself by habeas corpus to the King's Bench prison. He submitted to the council in November, and was thereupon released from prison. Early in 1591 he mentions, in further letters to Burghley, his quarrel with the widow Frances Radclyffe, Countess of Sussex, the injuries he sustained by his long confinement in the Tower, and the anxieties caused him by the enmity of one Richard More, who claimed his lands. In 1597 Burghley interceded with the barons of the exchequer, who pressed him for payment of £400 which he owed the crown. On 28 November 1604 he pointed out, in a letter to James I, the corruptions prevalent in the elections to the newly summoned parliament, and advised an immediate dissolution. His son Cecil married Elizabeth Griffin, daughter of Edward Griffin (died 1612) of Dingley, Northamptonshire and Mary Conyers.

== Works ==
Hall's chief literary work was Ten Books of Homer's Iliades, translated out of French, dedicated to Sir Thomas Cecil, London, 1581. This is the first attempt to render Homer into English. Hall closely follows the French verse translation of the first ten books by Hugues Salel (Paris, 1555), but occasionally used some Latin version. Hall's copy of Salel's translation is in the British Library, with his autograph on the title-page and the date 1556 affixed. His verse is rhymed fourteeners; the work if clumsy held its own till superseded by George Chapman's translation.
