= Roger Johnson (MP) =

16th-century English politician

Roger Johnson (by 1530 – 1564 or later) was an English politician.

He was a member (MP) of the parliament of England for Grantham in November 1554.
