= Edward Cust =

British Army general (1794–1878)

General Sir Edward Cust Bt KCH
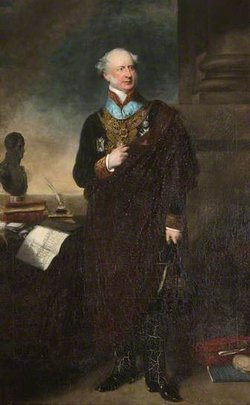
- 1840s portrait
- Born: 17 March 1794; London, Middlesex
- Died: 14 January 1878 (aged 83)
- Education: Eton College; Royal Military College, Sandhurst
- Occupations: Soldier; Politician; Courtier
- Spouse: Mary Anne Boode
- Children: 6
- Parent(s): Brownlow Cust, 1st Baron Brownlow; Frances Bankes

Sir Edward Cust, 1st Baronet, KCH (17 March 1794 – 14 January 1878) was a British soldier, politician and courtier.

== Early life ==
He was born in Hill Street, Berkeley Square, London, Middlesex, in 1794, the sixth son of the Brownlow Cust, 1st Baron Brownlow and his second wife Frances Bankes (1756–1847). His older brothers were John Cust, 1st Earl Brownlow, Peregrine Cust, Rev. Henry Cockayne Cust and William Cust.

Cust was educated at Eton College, and the Royal Military College. In 1810, he joined the 16th Regiment of Light Dragoons as a cadet and was Captain of the 5th Regiment of Dragoon Guards from 1816 and Major of the 55th Regiment of Foot from 1821.

== Parliamentarian ==
From 1818, Cust sat in Parliament as member of parliament for Grantham until 1826 and then for Lostwithiel from 1826 to 1832. As a Member of Parliament, he raised concerns about the management of public architectural projects, particular the works at Buckingham House. In 1831, he was knighted and appointed a KCH by William IV for his military service. In February 1834 he was elected a Fellow of the Royal Society.

After the Burning of Parliament in 1834, Cust proposed that the new Houses of Parliament should be to a design chosen in an open competition. He prevailed on Sir Robert Peel, Prime Minister in late 1834, and a competition was held. Cust in this way successfully opposed the appointment of Robert Smirke to be the architect. Peel was replaced by Lord Melbourne as Prime Minister in April 1835, and it was decided to proceed with the competition along Cust's lines, with the style limited to Elizabethan or Gothic, so rejecting the neo-classical.

In 1835 Cust was appointed one of the Royal Commissioners for reporting on the plans offered. The others, all amateurs from the point of view of architectural knowledge, were Charles Hanbury-Tracy, Thomas Liddell, 1st Baron Ravensworth, Samuel Rogers and George Vivian. The successful design was that of Charles Barry, whom Cust knew from the Travellers' Club.

== Courtier ==
In 1816 Cust became equerry to Prince Leopold of Saxe-Coburg, who that year married Princess Charlotte of Wales. When Leopold became the first King of the Belgians in 1831, Cust went to Belgium. Leopold made him a grand officer in his Order of Leopold in 1855.

In 1845, Queen Victoria appointed Cust Assistant Master of the Ceremonies and he was promoted to Master of the Ceremonies in 1847.

== New Zealand ==
Cust joined the Canterbury Association on 27 May 1848, but resigned again on 22 November of that year.

In 1849, the Cust River in Canterbury was named after Sir Edward Cust. The township of Cust was in turn named after the river.

== Later life ==
In 1859 Cust was given the colonelcy for life of the 16th (The Queen's) Regiment of (Light) Dragoons (Lancers). In 1876, he was made a baronet.

== Bibliography ==
Cust wrote:

- Lives of the warriors of the thirty years' war, Warriors of the 17th century, vol. part I, London: J. Murray, 1865
- Lives of the warriors of the thirty years' war, Warriors of the 17th century, vol. part II, London: J. Murray, 1865
- Lives of the warriors who have commanded fleets and armies before the enemy, Warriors of the 17th century, vol. 3 part III, London: J. Murray, 1869

== Family ==
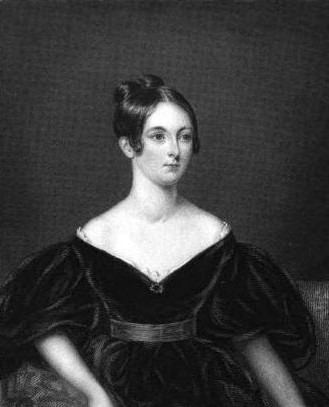
Mary Anne Cust, 1836 engraving

Cust married in 1821 Mary Anne Boode, daughter of Lewis William Boode of Peover Hall in Cheshire. They had a son and five daughters. The Boode family were Dutch planters in Demerara, Lewis William being originally Lodewijk Willem Boode, and the brother of Andreas Christian Boode (1763–1844). Mary inherited from her mother Margaret, daughter of the Rev. Thomas Dannett of Liverpool and a widow by 1802, the Greenwich Park estate in Demerara, on her death c.1827. Before Margaret's death, in the 1823–4 parliamentary session, Cust was appointed to the committee of the West India planters and merchants there.

Mary Cust was lady of the bedchamber to Princess Victoria of Saxe-Coburg-Saalfeld. A further family property inherited from her mother was Leasowe Castle. Edward Cust received half the compensation for the enslaved people on the Greenwich Park estate under the Slavery Abolition Act 1833.

The couple had a son and five daughters. The children were:

- Sir Leopold Cust, 2nd Baronet (1831–1878), married 1863 Charlotte Sobieski Isabel Bridgeman.
- Louisa Mary Ann (died 1863), married in 1862 the Rev. John James Moss. He was the son of John Moss (1782–1858), the plantation owner and Liverpool banker.
- Victoria Mary Louisa (died 1895) married 1846 Simon Yorke III (died 1894) of Erddig.
- Ethelred or Etheldreda Victoria (died 1893), married 1864 Charles Henry Congreve (died 1875).
- Margaret Amy Frances, married 1850 Charles Randle Egerton R.N. (died 1869). His father, Wilbraham Egerton of Tatton Park, had been executor for Margaret Boode.
- Henrietta Maria Christina (died 1846), did not marry.

Parliament of the United Kingdom
Preceded by Sir William Welby, Bt; Robert Smith	Member of Parliament for Grantham; 1818–1826; With: Sir William Welby, Bt 1818–1820; James Hughes 1820; Sir Montague Cholmeley, 1st Bt 1820–1826	Succeeded by Montague Cholmeley; Frederick Tollemache
Preceded by Sir Alexander Grant, Bt; Viscount Valletort	Member of Parliament for Lostwithiel; 1826–1832; With: Viscount Valletort 1826–1830; Hon. William Vesey-FitzGerald 1830; Viscount Valletort 1830–1832	Constituency disenfranchised
Court offices
Preceded by Thomas Hyde	Assistant Master of the Ceremonies; 1845–1847	Succeeded by William Cornwall
Preceded by Sir Robert Chester	Master of the Ceremonies; 1847–1876	Succeeded by Sir Francis Seymour
Military offices
Preceded by Sir Joseph Thackwell	Colonel of the 16th Lancers; 1859–1878	Succeeded by Sir Charles Shute
Baronetage of the United Kingdom
New creation	Baronet (of Leasowe Castle); 1876–1878	Succeeded by Leopold Cust
Professional and academic associations
Preceded by Charles, 3rd Earl of Sefton	President of the Historic Society of Lancashire and Cheshire; 1855–63	Succeeded by William Ewart Gladstone
