= Henry Cockayne-Cust =

British politician (1819 - 1884)

Henry Francis Cockayne-Cust
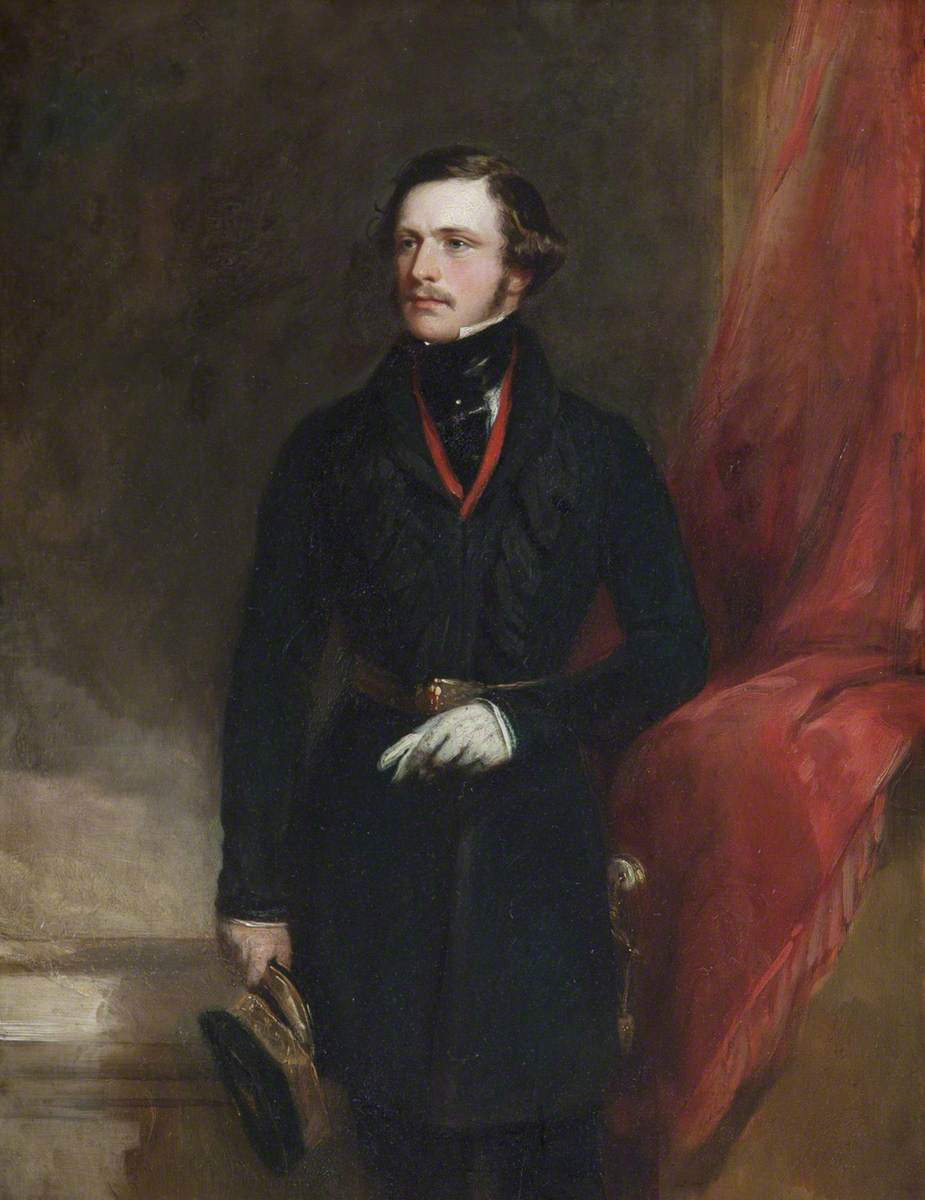
- Portrait of Cockayne-Cust by Stephen Catterson Smith

Member of Parliament for Grantham
- In office 1874–1880
- Preceded by: Frederick James Tollemache and Sir Hugh Cholmeley, 3rd Baronet
- Succeeded by: John William Mellor and Charles Savile Roundell

Personal details
- Born: 15 September 1819
- Died: 5 April 1884 (aged 64)
- Party: Conservative
- Spouse: Sara Jane Cookson
- Children: 6 (incl. Henry Cust and Adelbert Cust, 5th Baron Brownlow)
- Education: Eton College
- Profession: Army officer, politician

Military service
- Branch/service: British Army
- Rank: Major
- Unit: 8th King's Royal Irish Hussars; Shropshire Yeomanry

Henry Francis Cockayne-Cust (15 September 1819 – 5 April 1884), was a British Conservative Party politician.

== Background ==
Born Henry Cust, Cockayne-Cust was the eldest son of Reverend Henry Cust, Canon of Windsor, younger son of Brownlow Cust, 1st Baron Brownlow. His mother was Lady Anna Maria Elizabeth, daughter of Francis Needham, 1st Earl of Kilmorey. He later assumed the additional surname of Cockayne by Royal licence. He was educated at Eton College.

== Political and military career ==
Cockayne-Cust was a captain in the 8th Hussars and a Major in the Shropshire Yeomanry. In 1874 he entered Parliament as one of two representatives for Grantham, a seat he held until 1880.

== Family ==
Cockayne-Cust married Sara Jane, daughter of Isaac Cookson and widow of Sidney Robert Streatfield, in 1852. They had two sons and four daughters. Their eldest son was Henry Cust. Sara Jane died in childbirth in September 1867. Cockayne-Cust remained a widower until his death in April 1884, aged 64. His youngest son Adelbert succeeded as fifth Baron Brownlow in 1921.

Parliament of the United Kingdom
Preceded by Frederick James Tollemache; Sir Hugh Cholmeley, Bt	Member of Parliament for Grantham; 1874–1880; With: Sir Hugh Cholmeley, Bt	Succeeded by John William Mellor; Charles Savile Roundell
