= Edmund Turnor (Lincolnshire MP) =

English Conservative Party politician

Edmund Turnor (24 March 1838 – 15 December 1903) was an English Conservative Party politician who sat in the House of Commons from 1868 to 1880.

Turnor was the son of Christopher Turnor, M.P. for South Lincolnshire 1841–47, and his wife Lady Caroline Finch-Hatton, daughter of George Finch-Hatton, 10th Earl of Winchilsea, and grandson of antiquarian Edmund Turnor (1755–1829). He was educated at Harrow School and at Christ Church, Oxford, graduating B.A. in 1860. He was a deputy lieutenant of Lincolnshire, and a J.P. for parts of Kesteven and Lindsey in Lincolnshire.

Turnor was elected as a member of parliament (MP) for Grantham at a by-election in April 1868. At the 1868 general election Turnor was elected MP for South Lincolnshire. He held the seat until 1880.

Turnor died at the age of 65.

Turnor married Lady Mary Katherine Gordon, daughter of Charles Gordon, 10th Marquess of Huntly and Marie Antoinette Pegus in 1866. They had 12 children.

Parliament of the United Kingdom
Preceded by William Welby; John Thorold	Member of Parliament for Grantham; April 1868 – November 1868; With: John Thorold	Succeeded by Sir Hugh Cholmeley, Bt; Frederick Tollemache
Preceded by George Hussey Packe; William Welby	Member of Parliament for South Lincolnshire; 1868 – 1880; With: William Welby	Succeeded by John Lawrance; William Welby
