= James Wallis (English politician) =

English politician

James Wallis (died 1588) was an English politician.

He was a member (MP) of the parliament of England for Grantham in October 1553.
