= Edmund Hall (MP) =

16th-century English politician

Edmund Hall (by 1519 – 24 November 1592) was an English politician.

He was a member of the parliament of England for Grantham in 1545 and 1547.
