= John Wingfield (MP) =

Sixteenth century English member of Parliament

John Wingfield (1560–1626) was an English politician who sat in the House of Commons at various times between 1597 and 1626.

Wingfield was the son of Robert Wingfield of Upton, Northamptonshire and his wife Elizabeth Cecil, daughter of Richard Cecil of Little Burghley, Northamptonshire. Elizabeth was a sister of the statesman William Cecil who contributed 5 shillings to the cost of a puppet show at her wedding in September 1555.

Robert Wingfield was educated at Westminster School and entered Trinity College, Cambridge in 1578. He was justice of the peace for Kesteven, Lincolnshire from about 1583. He was feodary of Lincolnshire from 1594 to 1600 and was able to purchase lands in Rutland. In 1597, he was elected member of parliament for Peterborough. He was elected MP for Stamford in 1621 and for Grantham in 1626.

John Wingfield's elder brother Robert, of Upton (1558–1609), was MP for Stamford between 1584 and 1604. John Wingfield died at the age of about 66 and was buried in St Peter's Church, Tickencote.

Wingfield married first Elizabeth Gresham daughter of Paul Gresham, who brought him the manor of Tickencote in Rutland which became his principal residence. They had at least three sons and a daughter. She died in 1602 and he married secondly Margaret Blyth, widow of John Blyth of Denton and daughter of Robert Thorold of Haugh, Lincolnshire. They had two sons and three daughters.

Parliament of England
Preceded by Sir Thomas Reede; Thomas Hacke	Member of Parliament for Peterborough; 1597; With: Sir Richard Cecil	Succeeded by Nicholas Tufton; Goddard Pemberton
Preceded by Richard Cecil; John Jay	Member of Parliament for Stamford; 1621; With: Richard Cecil	Succeeded by Sir George Goring; John St Amand
Preceded by Sir George Manners; Sir William Airmine	Member of Parliament for Grantham; 1626; With: Edward Stirmin	Succeeded by Thomas Hatcher; Alexander Moor
