= Thomas Horsman =

English politician

Thomas Horsman (c. 1536 – 26 November 1610) was an English politician.

He was the son of Thomas Horsman (d. 1553) and Elizabeth, daughter of Sir Robert Hussey of Blankney, Lincolnshire and sister and co-heir of Thomas Hussey. At his death his father held Mareham Grange, formerly a grange of Haverholme Priory and the manor of Burton Pedwardine. A minor when his father died, Horsman was raised in the household of William Cecil, 1st Baron Burghley. He subsequently became a member of Elizabeth I's household, according to his epitaph serving as taster and server to the queen for four decades.

He was a Member (MP) of the Parliament of England for Grantham in 1593, 1597, 1601 and 1604, but seems not to have played an active role in proceedings. He was knighted at the Tower of London by the king on 14 March 1604, a few days before Parliament opened.

He married a widow called Anne (d. 1612), but died childless at the Savoy in November 1610. After his death a memorial was erected to him at Burton Pedwardine by his nephew and heir Thomas.
