= William Welby-Gregory =

British politician (1829-1898)

Sir William Welby-Gregory 4th Baronet
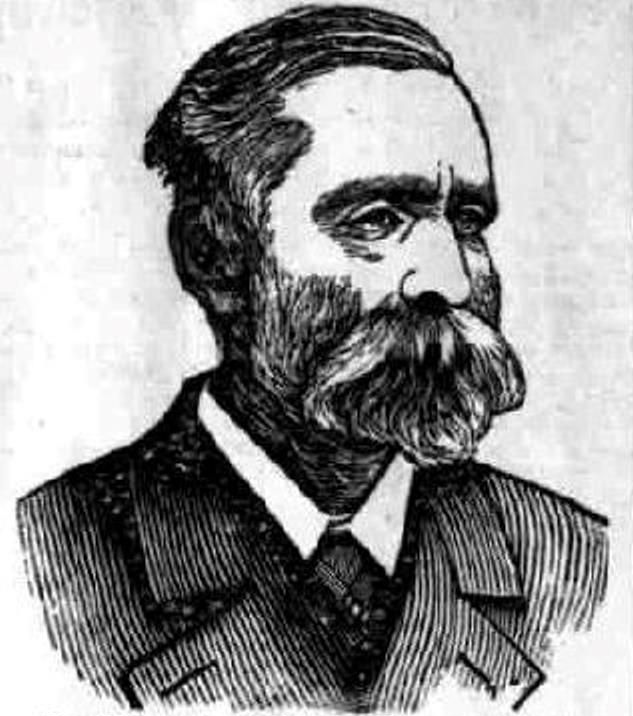
- Sir William Earle Welby-Gregory, Bart - 1898

Member of Parliament for Grantham
- In office 1857–1868 Serving with Frederick Tollemache (1857–1865); John Thorold (1865–1868)
- Preceded by: Sir Glynne Welby, Bt; Lord Montagu Graham
- Succeeded by: John Thorold; Edmund Turnor

Member of Parliament for South Lincolnshire
- In office 1868–1884
- Preceded by: John Trollope
- Succeeded by: Murray Finch-Hatton

Personal details
- Born: 4 January 1829
- Died: 26 November 1898 (aged 69)
- Party: Conservative
- Spouse: Victoria Stuart-Wortley (m. 1863)
- Parents: Sir Glynne Welby (father); Frances Cholmeley (mother)
- Relatives: Sir Montague Cholmeley (maternal grandfather); Alfred Welby (brother); Emmeline Welby-Gregory (daughter); Harry Cust (son-in-law)
- Education: Eton College
- Alma mater: Christ Church, Oxford

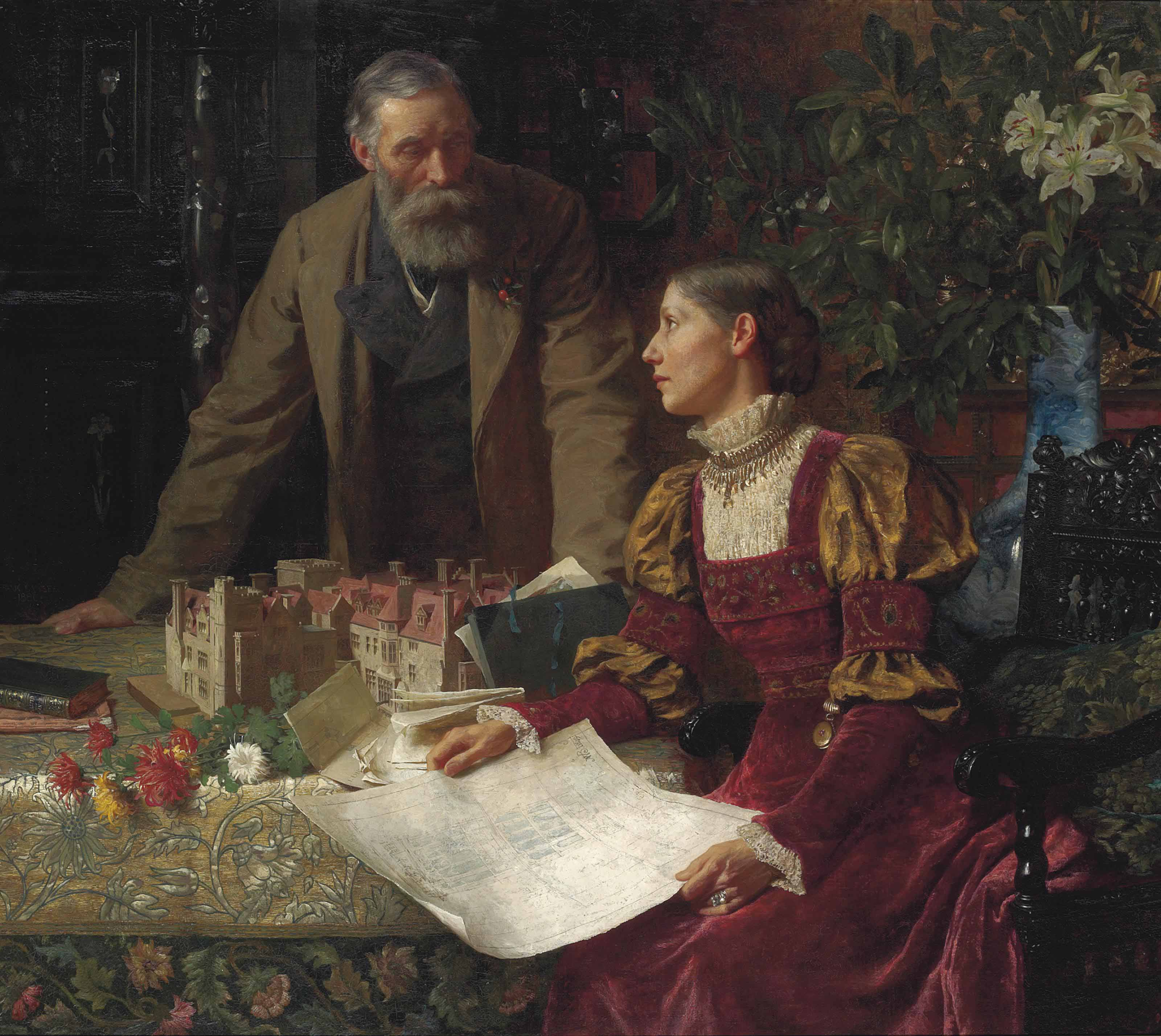
Frank Dicksee, The House Builders (1880), a painting portraying Sir W.E. and The Hon. Lady Welby-Gregory

Sir William Earle Welby-Gregory, 4th Baronet DL (4 January 1829 – 26 November 1898) was a British Conservative Party politician.

== Career ==
He was the son of Sir Glynne Welby, 3rd Baronet, educated at Eton College. He matriculated at Christ Church, Oxford in 1847, graduating B.A. in 1846.

Welby was elected as a Member of Parliament (MP) for Grantham at the 1857 general election, and held the seat until he resigned on 14 April 1868 (by taking the post of Steward of the Chiltern Hundreds) in order to contest a by-election for South Lincolnshire. He was elected unopposed South Lincolnshire on 29 April, and held the seat until he resigned again on 20 February 1884, this time by becoming Steward of the Manor of Northstead.

In 1889 he was appointed the first chairman of Kesteven County Council, a position he held until his death in 1898.

== Personal life ==
In 1863, William married Victoria Stuart-Wortley, by whom he had three children. He died on 26 November 1898.

== See also ==
- Welby baronets

Parliament of the United Kingdom
Preceded by Sir Glynne Welby, Bt; Lord Montagu Graham	Member of Parliament for Grantham; 1857–1868; With: Frederick Tollemache 1857–1865; John Thorold 1865–1868	Succeeded by John Thorold; Edmund Turnor
Preceded by John Trollope	Member of Parliament for South Lincolnshire; 1868–1884	Succeeded by Murray Finch-Hatton
Baronetage of the United Kingdom
Preceded by Glynne Welby	Baronet (of Denton Manor); 1875–1898	Succeeded by Charles Welby
