= George Williams (died 1556) =

English politician

George Williams (by 1521 – 1556) was an English politician.

He was a member (MP) of the parliament of England for Grantham in 1555.
