= Clement Cotterell (MP) =

English courtier and politician (1585–1631)

Sir Clement Cotterell (1585–1631) was an English courtier and politician, who sat in the House of Commons from 1621 to 1624.

== Political career ==
Cotterell became lord of the manor of Wilsford, Lincolnshire through his marriage with the heiress Anne Alleyne, daughter of Henry Alleyne of Wilsford.

In 1616 Cotterell was appointed muster master by the Duke of Buckingham. He was confirmed in the office of Groom Porter to King James on 10 July 1620 and knighted at Whitehall on 26 December 1620. As Groom porter, Cotterell had a grant to oversee and issue licences for activities such as card games, bowling alleys and tennis courts.

Cotterell served as a Vice-Admiral of Lincolnshire from 1620 to 1631. In 1621, he was elected Member of Parliament for Grantham. In 1624 he was re-elected MP for Grantham and elected also for Boston, but chose to remain with Grantham.

Cotterell's son Charles by Anne Alleyne became Master of Ceremonies.

Parliament of England
| Preceded by Sir George Reynell; Richard Tufton | Member of Parliament for Grantham; 1621–1624; With: Sir William Airmine 1621–1622; Sir George Manners 1624 | Succeeded by Sir George Manners; Sir William Airmine |
