= Franklin Hall =

Franklin Hall may refer to:

== Places ==
- Franklin Hall (Columbus, Mississippi), a Mississippi Landmark
- Franklin Hall (Goodwell, Oklahoma), listed on the NRHP in Oklahoma
- Franklin Hall, San Francisco, 1906 San Francisco earthquake Committee's final venue

== People ==
- Franklin P. Hall (born 1938), U.S. politician
- Franklin Hall (comics) a supervillain
- Franklin Hall (minister) (1907-1993), an American minister

== Organizations ==
- Franklin Hall was the nickname of Theta Xi's chapter at Yale University 1865-1936
