= Thomas Hussey (will proved 1558) =

English politician

Thomas Hussey (by 1509 – will proved 1558), of Halton Holegate and Caythorpe, Lincolnshire, was an English politician.

He was a member (MP) of the parliament of England for Great Grimsby in 1545; Grantham in March 1553 and April 1554; and Lincolnshire in October 1553.
