= Francis Hall (MP) =

16th-century English politician

Francis Hall (by 1476 – 14 August 1534) was an English politician.

He was a member (MP) of the parliament of England for Grantham in 1529.
