= Sir Montague Cholmeley, 2nd Baronet =

British Liberal Party politician and baronet

Sir Montague John Cholmeley, 2nd Baronet
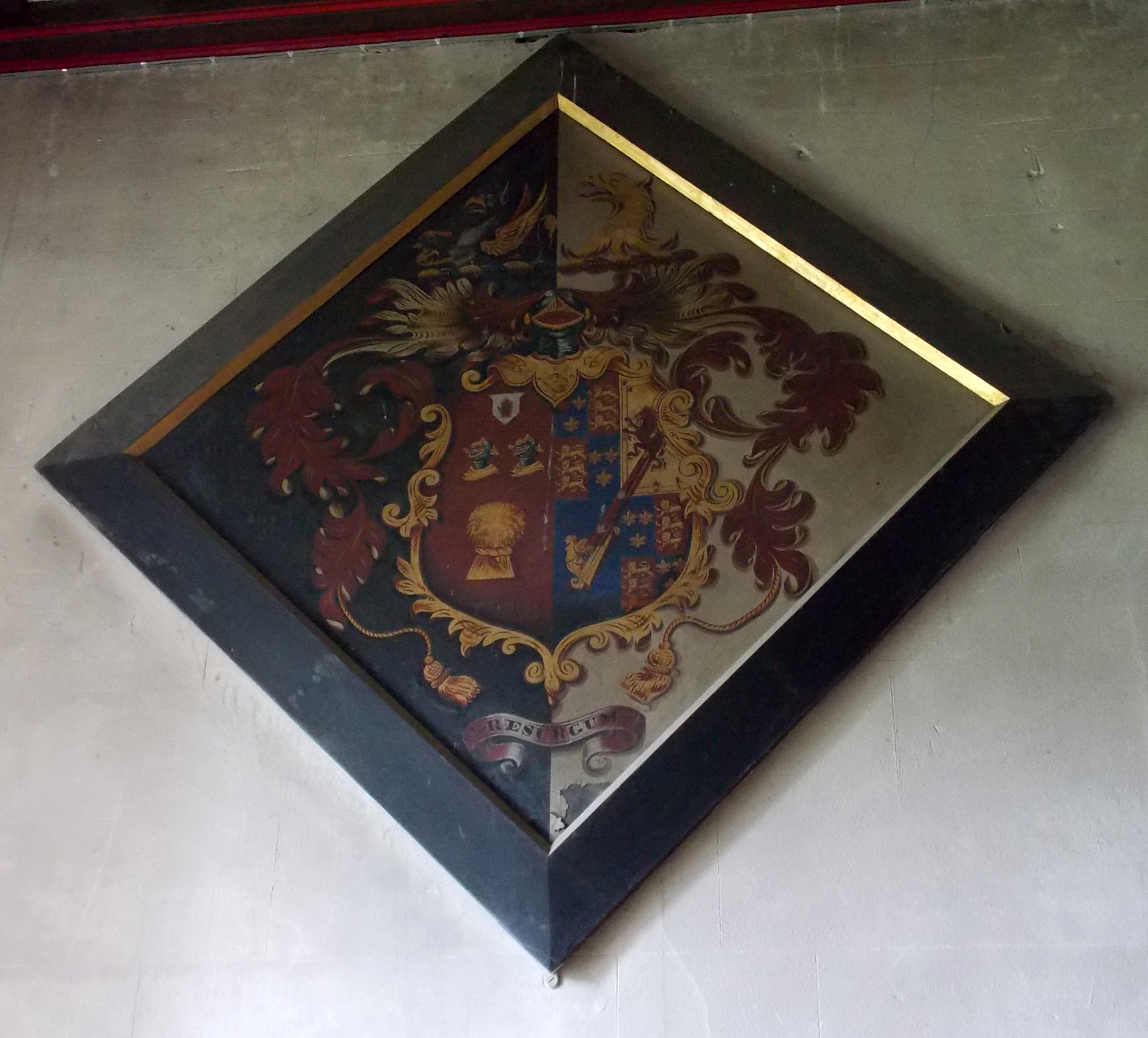
- Funeral hatchment at Stoke Rochford Church, Lincolnshire

Member of Parliament for Grantham
- In office 1826–1831 Serving with Frederick James Tollemache (1826–1830), Glynne Welby-Gregory (1830–1831)
- Monarchs: King George IV (1826–1830), King William IV (1830–1837), Queen Victoria (1837–1874)
- Preceded by: Sir Montague Cholmeley, 1st Baronet
- Succeeded by: Glynne Welby-Gregory and James Hughes
- Parliamentary group: Liberal (formerly Whig)
- Constituency: Grantham

Member of Parliament for North Lincolnshire
- In office 1847–1852 Serving with Robert Adam Christopher
- Preceded by: Charles Anderson-Pelham, 2nd Earl of Yarborough
- Succeeded by: James Stanhope and Robert Adam Christopher

Member of Parliament for North Lincolnshire
- In office 1857–1874 Serving with James Stanhope (1857–1868), Rowland Winn (1868–1874)
- Preceded by: James Stanhope and Robert Adam Christopher
- Succeeded by: Rowland Winn and Sir John Dugdale Astley

High Sheriff of Lincolnshire
- In office 1836–1836

Sir Montague John Cholmeley, 2nd Baronet (5 August 1802 – 18 January 1874) was a British Liberal Party politician and baronet.

He was the son of Sir Montague Cholmeley, 1st Baronet and his wife Elizabeth Harrison, daughter of John Harrison. In 1831, he succeeded his father as baronet. In 1826, Cholmeley replaced his father as Member of Parliament (MP) for Grantham, a seat he held until 1831. He was High Sheriff of Lincolnshire in 1836 and represented North Lincolnshire from 1847 to 1852 and again from 1857 to 1874.

On 10 February 1829, he married Lady Georgiana Beauclerk, fifth daughter of William Beauclerk, 8th Duke of St Albans and his wife Maria née Nelthorpe. They had a daughter and a son, Hugh, who succeeded to the baronetcy.

== See also ==
- Cholmeley baronets
- Easton Hall, the family seat

Parliament of the United Kingdom
Preceded by Sir Montague Cholmeley, 1st Bt; Edward Cust	Member of Parliament for Grantham; 1826 – 1831; With: Frederick James Tollemache 1826–1830; Glynne Welby-Gregory 1830–1831	Succeeded by Glynne Welby-Gregory; James Hughes
Preceded by Charles Anderson-Pelham; Robert Adam Christopher	Member of Parliament for North Lincolnshire; 1847 – 1852; With: Robert Adam Christopher	Succeeded by James Stanhope; Robert Adam Christopher
Preceded by James Stanhope; Robert Adam Christopher	Member of Parliament for North Lincolnshire; 1857 – 1874; With: James Stanhope 1857–1868; Rowland Winn 1868–1874	Succeeded by Rowland Winn; Sir John Dugdale Astley
Baronetage of the United Kingdom
Preceded by Montague Cholmeley	Baronet (of Easton); 1831–1874	Succeeded by Hugh Cholmeley
