= James Hughes (British politician) =

Colonel James Hughes CB (died 26 November 1845) was a British Army officer and politician.

In 1803, then a captain in the 48th Foot, Hughes exchanged into the 18th Light Dragoons, the regiment in which he was to remain for the rest of his career. He purchased a majority in 1812, was appointed Companion of the Order of the Bath (CB) in 1815, and promoted brevet lieutenant-colonel in 1817 and colonel in 1837, the latter while on half-pay.

He unsuccessfully contested Grantham in 1818, being returned fourth in the poll with 14 votes of 1376 cast. He was returned in 1820, but the election was voided and Sir Montague Cholmeley, Bt returned instead. He was again returned from Grantham in 1831, but the Tollemache interest regained the seat in 1832.

On 16 March 1841, he married Frances Anna Jane Stanhope, daughter of Sir Francis Charles Stanhope and granddaughter of Charles Stanhope, 3rd Earl Stanhope.

Parliament of the United Kingdom
Preceded by Sir William Welby, Bt; Edward Cust	Member of Parliament for Grantham; 1820 – 1820; Served alongside: Edward Cust	Succeeded by Edward Cust; Sir Montague Cholmeley, 1st Bt
Preceded by Montague Cholmeley; Glynne Earle Welby	Member of Parliament for Grantham; 1831 – 1832; Served alongside: Glynne Earle Welby	Succeeded by Glynne Earle Welby; Algernon Gray Tollemache
