= Frank Hall (sailor) =

Canadian sailor (born 1944)

Frank Hall (born 15 December 1944 in Ottawa) is a Canadian former sailor who competed in the 1972 Summer Olympics.
