= Sir Hugh Cholmeley, 3rd Baronet =

British soldier, landowner and Liberal politician

Sir Hugh Cholmeley, 3rd Baronet DL JP

Member of Parliament for Grantham
- In office 27 April 1868 – 1880 Serving with Frederick James Tollemache (1868–1874), Henry Francis Cockayne Cust (1874–1880)
- Monarch: Queen Victoria
- Preceded by: Edmund Turnor
- Succeeded by: John William Mellor and Charles Savile Roundell
- Parliamentary group: Liberal
- Constituency: Grantham

High Sheriff of Lincolnshire
- In office 1885–1885

Member of Kesteven County Council for Ponton
- Incumbent
- Assumed office 1889

Sir Hugh Arthur Henry Cholmeley, 3rd Baronet, DL, JP (18 October 1839 – 14 February 1904) was a British soldier, landowner, and Liberal politician.

== Career ==
Cholmeley was the eldest son of Sir Montague John Cholmeley, 2nd Baronet and Lady Georgiana Beauclerk, fifth daughter of the 8th Duke of St Albans. Cholmeley was educated at Harrow School. He then served in the Grenadier Guards and reached the rank of Captain. In January 1868, he succeeded his father as baronet.

At a parliamentary by-election on 27 April 1868 in Grantham, Cholmeley stood unsuccessfully for the Liberals, beaten by Edmund Turnor, but at the general election later in the same year he was elected as a Member of Parliament unopposed, with Turnor choosing to stand elsewhere. He held one of the borough’s two seats until the elections of 1880, when he did not stand again. He became High Sheriff of Lincolnshire in 1885 and was a Justice of Peace and deputy lieutenant for the same county. At the 1889 Kesteven County Council election he was elected to the newly created Kesteven County Council as the member for Ponton.

== Personal life ==
On 12 August 1874, he married Edith Sophia Rowley, daughter of Sir Charles Rowley, 4th Baronet. They had four daughters and a son, Montague, who succeeded to the baronetcy.

Cholmeley is commemorated at St Andrew and St Mary's Church, Stoke Rochford, by a stained glass window erected by his widow and children. Further windows in the church were erected, one to his son Montague, the other to Lady Cholmeley.

Parliament of the United Kingdom
Preceded by Sir Henry Thorold; Edmund Turnor	Member of Parliament for Grantham; 1868 – 1880; With: Frederick James Tollemache 1868–1874; Henry Francis Cockayne Cust 1874–1880	Succeeded by John William Mellor; Charles Savile Roundell
Baronetage of the United Kingdom
Preceded by Montague Cholmeley	Baronet (of Easton); 1868 – 1904	Succeeded by Montague Cholmeley
