= Oliver Manners =

English politician

Oliver Manners (c. 1581 – July or August 1613) was an English politician. He was the son of John Manners, 4th Earl of Rutland and his wife, Elizabeth Charlton.

He was a member (MP) of the parliament of England for Grantham in 1601.
