= Grantham (constituency) =

Parliamentary constituency in the United Kingdom, 1885–1997

- Former county constituency for the House of Commons
- County: Lincolnshire
- Major settlements: Grantham

1918–1997
- Seats: One
- Replaced by: Sleaford & North Hykeham, and Grantham & Stamford

1885–1918
- Seats: One
- Type of constituency: Borough constituency

1468–1885
- Seats: Two
- Type of constituency: Borough constituency

Grantham was a Parliamentary constituency in Lincolnshire, England.

The constituency was created in 1468 as a parliamentary borough which elected two Members of Parliament (MPs) to the House of Commons of the Parliament of England until the union with Scotland, and then to the Parliament of Great Britain until the Act of Union 1800 established the Parliament of the United Kingdom.

The parliamentary borough had its representation reduced to one MP in 1885, and was finally abolished in 1918, the name transferring to a new county division which elected one MP. The county constituency was abolished for the 1997 election, and the area formerly covered by this constituency is now mostly in Sleaford and North Hykeham. Grantham became part of the new constituency of Grantham and Stamford.

The 2023 Periodic Review of Westminster constituencies proposes to re-establish the seat in its revised proposal.

== Boundaries ==
The constituency was based on Grantham, a market town on the River Witham.

== Members of Parliament ==
=== MPs 1468–1640 ===
Year	First member	Second member
1491	John Mordaunt	
1510–1523	No names known	
1529	William Hussey	Francis Hall
1536	?	
1539	?	
1542	?	
1545	Sir Edward Warner	Edmund Hall
1547	Sir Edward Warner	Edmund Hall
1553 (Mar)	Sir Edward Warner	Thomas Hussey
1553 (Oct)	Sir Edward Warner	James Wallis
1554 (Apr)	Thomas Hussey	Richard Disney
1554 (Nov)	Roger Johnson	Richard Sharpe
1555	George Williams	William Porter
1558	Henry Savile	Anthony Thorold
1559 (Jan)	Thomas Randolph	William More
1562–3	Roger Manners	William Cooke
1571	William Killigrew	Arthur Hall
1572	John Vaughan	Arthur Hall
1584 (Nov)	Arthur Hall	William Thorold
1586 (Oct)	Sir Henry Bagenall, sat for Anglesey, repl. by William Ashby	Robert Markham
1588–9	Richard More	William Armyn
1593	Thomas Horsman	Francis Neale
1597 (Oct)	Thomas Horsman	Francis Neale
1601 (Oct)	Oliver Manners	Thomas Horsman
1604	Sir George Manners	Sir Thomas Horsman
1614	Sir George Reynell	Richard Tufton
1621	Sir William Armyne	Sir Clement Cotterell
1624	Sir George Manners	Sir Clement Cotterell
1625	Sir George Manners	Sir William Airmine
1626	John Wingfield	Edward Stirmin
1628–1629	Thomas Hatcher	Alexander Moor

=== MPs 1640–1885 ===
Election	First Member	First Party	Second Member	Second Party
April 1640	Sir Edward Bashe		Henry Pelham	
November 1640	Thomas Hussey	Royalist	Henry Pelham	Parliamentarian
1641	Sir William Airmine	Parliamentarian	Henry Pelham	Parliamentarian
December 1648	Sir William Airmine	Parliamentarian	Pelham excluded in Pride's Purge – seat vacant	
1653	Grantham was unrepresented in the Barebones Parliament			
1654	William Bury		Grantham had only one seat in the First and Second Parliaments of the Protectorate	
1656	William Ellys		Grantham had only one seat in the First and Second Parliaments of the Protectorate	
January 1659	Thomas Skipwith		Sir William Ellys	
May 1659	Not represented in the restored Rump			
April 1660	Thomas Skipwith		Sir John Newton	
1661	Sir William Thorold		Sir John Newton	
1678	Sir Robert Markham		Sir John Newton	
1679	Sir William Ellys		Sir John Newton	
1685	Thomas Harrington		John Thorold	
1689	Sir John Brownlow		Sir William Ellys	
1697	Sir John Thorold		Sir William Ellys	
Jan. 1701	Thomas Baptist Manners		Sir William Ellys	
Nov. 1701	Richard Ellys		Sir William Ellys	
1705	Marquess of Granby		Sir William Ellys	
1711	Sir John Thorold		Sir William Ellys	
1713	Sir John Thorold		Sir John Brownlow	
1715	Edward Rolt		John Heathcote	
1722	Francis Fisher		The Viscount Tyrconnel	
1727	Sir Michael Newton		The Viscount Tyrconnel	
1741	Sir Michael Newton		Marquess of Granby	
1743	Sir John Cust		Marquess of Granby	
1754	Sir John Cust		Lord George Manners	
1770	Francis Cust		Lord George Manners	
1774	Sir Brownlow Cust		Lord George Manners	
1776	Peregrine Cust		Lord George Manners	
1780	Francis Cockayne-Cust		George Manners-Sutton	Tory
1792	Philip Yorke		George Manners-Sutton	Tory
1793	Simon Yorke	Tory	George Manners-Sutton	Tory
1802	Thomas Thoroton	Tory	Sir William Earle Welby, Bt	Tory
1806	Thomas Thoroton	Tory	Russell Manners	Whig
1807	Thomas Thoroton	Tory	Sir William Earle Welby, Bt	Tory
1812	Robert Percy Smith		Sir William Earle Welby, Bt	Tory
1818	Edward Cust	Tory	Sir William Earle Welby, Bt	Tory
March 1820	Edward Cust	Tory	James Hughes	Whig
July 1820	Edward Cust	Tory	Sir Montague Cholmeley, 1st Bt	Whig
1826	Frederick Tollemache	Tory	Montague Cholmeley	Whig
1830	Glynne Welby	Tory	Montague Cholmeley	Whig
1831	Glynne Welby	Tory	James Hughes	Whig
1832	Glynne Welby	Tory	Hon. Algernon Tollemache	Tory
1834	Glynne Welby	Conservative	Hon. Algernon Tollemache	Conservative
1837	Glynne Welby	Conservative	Hon. Frederick Tollemache	Conservative
1852	Glynne Welby	Conservative	Lord Montagu Graham	Conservative
1857	William Welby	Conservative	Hon. Frederick Tollemache	Peelite
1859	William Welby	Conservative	Hon. Frederick Tollemache	Liberal
1865	William Welby	Conservative	John Thorold	Conservative
1868 by-election	Edmund Turnor	Conservative	John Thorold	Conservative
1868	Sir Hugh Cholmeley, Bt	Liberal	Hon. Frederick Tollemache	Liberal
1874	Sir Hugh Cholmeley, Bt	Liberal	Henry Cockayne-Cust	Conservative
1880	John William Mellor	Liberal	Charles Savile Roundell	Liberal
1885	representation reduced to one member			

=== MPs 1885–1997 ===
Election	Member	Party
1885	John William Mellor	Liberal
1886	Malcolm Low	Conservative
1892	Henry Lopes	Conservative
1900	Arthur Priestley	Liberal
1918	Edmund Royds	Coalition Conservative
1922	Robert Pattinson	Liberal
1923	Victor Warrender	Conservative
1942 by-election	Denis Kendall	Independent
1950	Eric Smith	Conservative
1951	Joseph Godber	Conservative
1979	Douglas Hogg	Conservative
1997	constituency abolished: see Grantham and Stamford	

== Elections ==
=== Elections in the 1830s ===
General election 1830: Grantham (2 seats)
Party	Candidate	Votes	%	±%
Tory	Glynne Welby	547	39.0	
Whig	Montague Cholmeley	469	33.5	
Tory	Frederick Tollemache	385	27.5	
Turnout		864	c. 86.4	
Registered electors		c. 1,000		
Majority		78	5.5	
Tory hold		Swing		
Majority		84	6.0	
Whig hold		Swing		

General election 1831: Grantham (2 seats)
Party	Candidate	Votes	%	±%
Tory	Glynne Welby	426	28.5	−10.5
Whig	James Hughes	408	27.3	−6.2
Tory	Algernon Tollemache	378	25.3	N/A
Tory	Felix Tollemache	283	18.9	N/A
Turnout		842	c. 84.2	c. −2.2
Registered electors		c. 1,000		
Majority		18	1.2	−4.3
Tory hold				
Majority		30	2.0	−4.0
Whig hold				

General election 1832: Grantham (2 seats)
Party	Candidate	Votes	%	±%
Tory	Algernon Tollemache	388	41.6	+16.3
Tory	Glynne Welby	303	32.5	+4.0
Whig	Montague Cholmeley	241	25.9	−1.4
Majority		62	6.6	+5.4
Turnout		650	93.1	c. +8.9
Registered electors		698		
Tory hold		Swing	+8.5	
Tory gain from Whig		Swing	+2.4	

General election 1835: Grantham (2 seats)
Party	Candidate	Votes	%	±%
Conservative	Algernon Tollemache	351	41.2	−0.4
Conservative	Glynne Welby	351	41.2	+8.7
Whig	George Frederick Holt	149	17.5	−8.4
Majority		202	23.7	+17.1
Turnout		559	83.8	−9.3
Registered electors		667		
Conservative hold		Swing	+1.9	
Conservative hold		Swing	+6.5	

General election 1837: Grantham (2 seats)
Party	Candidate	Votes	%	±%
Conservative	Glynne Welby	398	39.9	−1.3
Conservative	Frederick Tollemache	308	30.9	−10.3
Whig	Robert Turner	291	29.2	+11.7
Majority		17	1.7	−22.0
Turnout		582	87.0	+3.2
Registered electors		669		
Conservative hold		Swing	−3.6	
Conservative hold		Swing	−8.1	

=== Elections in the 1840s ===
General election 1841: Grantham (2 seats)
Party	Candidate	Votes	%	±%
Conservative	Glynne Welby	Unopposed		
Conservative	Frederick Tollemache	Unopposed		
Registered electors		691		
Conservative hold				
Conservative hold				

General election 1847: Grantham (2 seats)
Party	Candidate	Votes	%	±%
Conservative	Glynne Welby	Unopposed		
Conservative	Frederick Tollemache	Unopposed		
Registered electors		760		
Conservative hold				
Conservative hold				

=== Elections in the 1850s ===
General election 1852: Grantham (2 seats)
Party	Candidate	Votes	%	±%
Conservative	Glynne Welby	483	40.7	N/A
Conservative	Montagu Graham	375	31.6	N/A
Peelite	Frederick Tollemache	329	27.7	N/A
Majority		46	3.9	N/A
Turnout		594 (est)	76.7 (est)	N/A
Registered electors		774		
Conservative hold		Swing	N/A	
Conservative hold		Swing	N/A	

General election 1857: Grantham (2 seats)
Party	Candidate	Votes	%	±%
Conservative	William Welby	472	40.2	−0.5
Peelite	Frederick Tollemache	393	33.5	+5.8
Conservative	Montagu Graham	308	26.3	−5.3
Turnout		587 (est)	79.3 (est)	+2.6
Registered electors		740		
Majority		79	6.7	+2.8
Conservative hold		Swing	−1.7	
Majority		85	7.2	N/A
Peelite gain from Conservative		Swing	+5.8	

General election 1859: Grantham (2 seats)
Party	Candidate	Votes	%	±%
Conservative	William Welby	Unopposed		
Liberal	Frederick Tollemache	Unopposed		
Registered electors		743		
Conservative hold				
Liberal hold				

=== Elections in the 1860s ===
General election 1865: Grantham (2 seats)
Party	Candidate	Votes	%	±%
Conservative	John Thorold	432	37.5	N/A
Conservative	William Welby	404	35.1	N/A
Liberal	Frederick Tollemache	315	27.4	N/A
Majority		89	7.7	N/A
Turnout		733 (est)	97.1 (est)	N/A
Registered electors		755		
Conservative hold		Swing	N/A	
Conservative gain from Liberal		Swing	N/A	

Welby resigned in order to contest the 1868 by-election in South Lincolnshire, causing a by-election.

By-election, 27 April 1868: Grantham (1 seat)
Party	Candidate	Votes	%	±%
Conservative	Edmund Turnor	374	55.6	−17.0
Liberal	Hugh Cholmeley	299	44.4	+17.0
Majority		75	11.2	+3.5
Turnout		673	89.1	−8.0
Registered electors		755		
Conservative hold		Swing	−17.0	

General election 1868: Grantham (2 seats)
Party	Candidate	Votes	%	±%
Liberal	Frederick Tollemache	Unopposed		
Liberal	Hugh Cholmeley	Unopposed		
Registered electors		2,018		
Liberal hold				
Liberal gain from Conservative				

=== Elections in the 1870s ===
General election 1874: Grantham (2 seats)
Party	Candidate	Votes	%	±%
Liberal	Hugh Cholmeley	1,055	36.1	N/A
Conservative	Henry Cockayne-Cust	965	33.1	New
Liberal	John William Mellor	899	30.8	N/A
Turnout		1,942 (est)	88.3 (est)	N/A
Registered electors		2,199		
Majority		90	3.0	N/A
Liberal hold		Swing	N/A	
Majority		66	2.3	N/A
Conservative gain from Liberal		Swing	N/A	

=== Elections in the 1880s ===
General election 1880: Grantham (2 seats)
Party	Candidate	Votes	%	±%
Liberal	John William Mellor	1,329	30.3	−0.5
Liberal	Charles Savile Roundell	1,304	29.8	−6.3
Conservative	Henry Cockayne-Cust	915	20.9	+4.3
Conservative	Charles Brinsley Marlay	835	19.1	+2.5
Majority		389	8.9	+5.9
Turnout		2,192 (est)	91.7 (est)	+3.4
Registered electors		2,390		
Liberal hold		Swing	−4.4	
Liberal gain from Conservative		Swing	−2.4	

General election 1885: Grantham
Party	Candidate	Votes	%	±%
Liberal	John William Mellor	1,377	54.9	−5.2
Conservative	Alfred Welby	1,131	45.1	+5.1
Majority		246	9.8	+0.9
Turnout		2,508	87.0	−4.7 (est)
Registered electors		2,883		
Liberal hold		Swing	−5.1	

Mellor was appointed Judge Advocate General of the Armed Forces, requiring a by-election.

1886 Grantham by-election
Party	Candidate	Votes	%	±%
Liberal	John William Mellor	Unopposed		
Liberal hold				

General election 1886: Grantham
Party	Candidate	Votes	%	±%
Conservative	Malcolm Low	1,197	50.8	+5.7
Liberal	John William Mellor	1,161	49.2	−5.7
Majority		36	1.6	N/A
Turnout		2,358	81.8	−5.2
Registered electors		2,883		
Conservative gain from Liberal		Swing	+5.7	

=== Elections in the 1890s ===
Henry Lopes

General election 1892: Grantham
Party	Candidate	Votes	%	±%
Conservative	Henry Lopes	1,296	50.6	−0.2
Liberal	Thomas Chatfeild Clarke	1,263	49.4	+0.2
Majority		33	1.2	−0.4
Turnout		2,559	95.0	+13.2
Registered electors		2,693		
Conservative hold		Swing	−0.2	

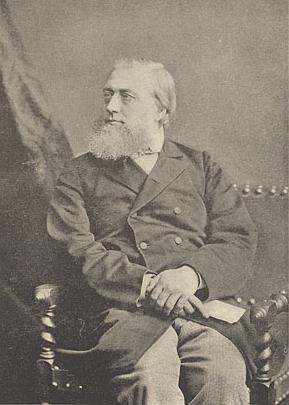
Samuel Waddy

General election 1895: Grantham
Party	Candidate	Votes	%	±%
Conservative	Henry Lopes	1,507	56.4	+5.8
Liberal	Samuel Danks Waddy	1,167	43.6	−5.8
Majority		340	12.8	+11.6
Turnout		2,674	92.3	−2.7
Registered electors		2,896		
Conservative hold		Swing	+5.8	

=== Elections in the 1900s ===
Priestley

General election 1900: Grantham
Party	Candidate	Votes	%	±%
Liberal	Arthur Priestley	1,347	50.7	+7.1
Conservative	Henry Lopes	1,309	49.3	−7.1
Majority		38	1.4	N/A
Turnout		2,656	87.2	−5.1
Registered electors		3,046		
Liberal gain from Conservative		Swing	+7.1	

General election 1906: Grantham
Party	Candidate	Votes	%	±%
Liberal	Arthur Priestley	1,663	51.7	+1.0
Conservative	Henry Brassey	1,554	48.3	−1.0
Majority		109	3.4	+2.0
Turnout		3,217	95.1	+7.9
Registered electors		3,383		
Liberal hold		Swing	+1.0	

=== Elections in the 1910s ===
General election January 1910: Grantham
Party	Candidate	Votes	%	±%
Liberal	Arthur Priestley	1,848	52.0	+0.3
Conservative	Geoffrey Henry Julian Skeffington Smyth	1,703	48.0	−0.3
Majority		145	4.0	+0.6
Turnout		3,551	97.4	+2.3
Registered electors		3,647		
Liberal hold		Swing	+0.3	

General election December 1910: Grantham
Party	Candidate	Votes	%	±%
Liberal	Arthur Priestley	1,730	50.5	−1.5
Conservative	Herbert Guy Snowden	1,697	49.5	+1.5
Majority		33	1.0	−3.0
Turnout		3,427	94.0	−3.4
Registered electors		3,647		
Liberal hold		Swing	−1.5	

General Election 1914–15:

Another General Election was required to take place before the end of 1915. The political parties had been making preparations for an election to take place and by July 1914, the following candidates had been selected;

- Liberal: Ernest Bennett
- Unionist: Herbert Guy Snowden

General election 1918: Grantham
Party		Candidate	Votes	%	±%
C	Unionist	Edmund Royds	9,972	48.4	−1.1
	Liberal	Robert Pattinson	8,701	42.2	−8.3
	Independent Labour and Agriculturalist	William Bilton Harris	1,927	9.4	New
Majority			1,271	6.2	N/A
Turnout			20,600	58.1	−35.9
Registered electors			35,462		
	Unionist gain from Liberal		Swing	+3.6	
C indicates candidate endorsed by the coalition government.

=== Elections in the 1920s ===
General election 1922: Grantham
Party	Candidate	Votes	%	±%
Liberal	Robert Pattinson	11,723	41.4	−0.8
Unionist	Edmund Royds	11,295	39.8	−8.6
Labour	John Henry Jones	5,332	18.8	New
Majority		428	1.6	N/A
Turnout		28,350	79.5	+21.4
Registered electors		35,655		
Liberal gain from Unionist		Swing	+3.9	

General election 1923: Grantham
Party	Candidate	Votes	%	±%
Unionist	Victor Warrender	12,552	43.5	+3.7
Liberal	Robert Pattinson	10,819	37.6	−3.8
Labour	Montague William Moore	5,440	18.9	+0.1
Majority		1,733	5.9	N/A
Turnout		28,811	79.1	−0.4
Registered electors		36,444		
Unionist gain from Liberal		Swing	+3.8	

General election 1924: Grantham
Party	Candidate	Votes	%	±%
Unionist	Victor Warrender	14,746	49.5	+6.0
Liberal	Alexander Lyle-Samuel	7,730	26.0	−11.6
Labour	Montague William Moore	7,279	24.5	+5.6
Majority		7,016	23.5	+17.6
Turnout		29,755	80.4	+1.3
Registered electors		37,021		
Unionist hold		Swing	+8.8	

General election 1929: Grantham
Party	Candidate	Votes	%	±%
Unionist	Victor Warrender	16,121	40.8	−8.7
Liberal	R Hamilton Brown	12,023	30.4	+4.4
Labour	Montague William Moore	11,340	28.7	+4.2
Majority		4,098	10.4	−13.1
Turnout		39,484	81.9	+1.5
Registered electors		48,216		
Unionist hold		Swing	−6.6	

=== Elections in the 1930s ===
General election 1931: Grantham
Party	Candidate	Votes	%	±%
Conservative	Victor Warrender	27,164	69.2	+28.4
Labour	Montague William Moore	12,115	30.8	+2.1
Majority		15,049	38.4	+28.0
Turnout		39,279	79.5	−2.4
Conservative hold		Swing		

General election 1935: Grantham
Party	Candidate	Votes	%	±%
Conservative	Victor Warrender	22,194	58.1	−11.1
Labour	Montague William Moore	16,009	41.9	+11.1
Majority		6,185	16.2	−22.2
Turnout		38,203	74.2	−5.3
Conservative hold		Swing		

General Election 1939–40:

Another General Election was required to take place before the end of 1940. The political parties had been making preparations for an election to take place and by the Autumn of 1939, the following candidates had been selected;

- Conservative: Victor Warrender
- Labour: Montague William Moore

=== Elections in the 1940s ===
1942 Grantham by-election
Party	Candidate	Votes	%	±%
Independent	Denis Kendall	11,758	50.8	New
Conservative	Arthur Longmore	11,391	49.2	−8.9
Majority		367	1.6	N/A
Turnout		23,149	42.6	−31.6
Independent gain from Conservative		Swing		

General election 1945: Grantham
Party	Candidate	Votes	%	±%
Independent	Denis Kendall	27,719	58.2	N/A
Conservative	George Arthur Worth	12,206	25.6	−32.5
Labour	Thomas Sansby Bavin	7,728	16.2	−25.7
Majority		15,513	32.6	N/A
Turnout		47,653	75.9	+1.7
Independent hold		Swing		

=== Elections in the 1950s ===
General election 1950: Grantham
Party	Candidate	Votes	%	±%
Conservative	Eric Smith	19,195	41.33	
Labour	Albert Edward Millett	14,457	31.13	
Independent	Denis Kendall	12,792	27.54	
Majority		4,738	10.20	N/A
Turnout		46,444		
Conservative gain from Independent		Swing		

General election 1951: Grantham
Party	Candidate	Votes	%	±%
Conservative	Joseph Godber	20,712	43.47	
Labour	Albert Edward Millett	18,540	38.91	
Liberal	Denis Kendall	8,396	17.62	New
Majority		2,172	4.56	
Turnout		47,648		
Conservative hold		Swing		

General election 1955: Grantham
Party	Candidate	Votes	%	±%
Conservative	Joseph Godber	24,188	50.8	+7.3
Labour	Woodrow Wyatt	21,813	45.8	+6.9
Liberal	Reginald Clifford Gaul	1,624	3.4	−14.2
Majority		2,375	5.0	+0.4
Turnout		47,625		
Conservative hold		Swing		

General election 1959: Grantham
Party	Candidate	Votes	%	±%
Conservative	Joseph Godber	27,482	56.8	+6.0
Labour	Thomas Skeffington-Lodge	20,867	43.2	−2.6
Majority		6,615	13.6	+8.6
Turnout		48,349	81.9	
Conservative hold		Swing		

=== Elections in the 1960s ===
General election 1964: Grantham
Party	Candidate	Votes	%	±%
Conservative	Joseph Godber	27,634	55.9	−0.9
Labour	Peter Horton	21,770	44.1	+0.9
Majority		5,864	11.8	−1.8
Turnout		49,404	78.8	−3.1
Conservative hold		Swing		

General election 1966: Grantham
Party	Candidate	Votes	%	±%
Conservative	Joseph Godber	24,748	47.7	−8.2
Labour	Mary Large	22,590	43.6	+0.5
Liberal	David C. Howie	4,503	8.7	New
Majority		2,158	4.1	−7.7
Turnout		51,841	80.6	+1.8
Conservative hold		Swing		

=== Elections in the 1970s ===
General election 1970: Grantham
Party	Candidate	Votes	%	±%
Conservative	Joseph Godber	33,070	58.7	+11.0
Labour	W. Frank Higgins	23,296	41.3	−2.3
Majority		9,774	17.4	+13.3
Turnout		56,366		
Conservative hold		Swing		

General election February 1974: Grantham
Party	Candidate	Votes	%	±%
Conservative	Joseph Godber	31,910	50.44	
Labour	SM Smedley	20,567	32.51	
Independent Liberal	WT Bailey	10,781	17.04	New
Majority		11,343	17.93	
Turnout		63,258	81.37	
Conservative hold		Swing		

General election October 1974: Grantham
Party	Candidate	Votes	%	±%
Conservative	Joseph Godber	27,738	47.66	
Labour	SM Smedley	19,708	33.86	
Liberal	WT Bailey	10,752	18.47	
Majority		8,030	13.80	
Turnout		58,198	74.23	
Conservative hold		Swing		

General election 1979: Grantham
Party	Candidate	Votes	%	±%
Conservative	Douglas Hogg	36,697	55.52	
Labour	V Bell	18,547	28.06	
Liberal	WT Bailey	10,852	16.42	
Majority		18,150	27.46	
Turnout		66,096	78.24	
Conservative hold		Swing		

=== Elections in the 1980s ===
General election 1983: Grantham
Party	Candidate	Votes	%	±%
Conservative	Douglas Hogg	31,692	57.47	
Liberal	Simon Titley	12,781	23.17	
Labour	Terence Savage	10,677	19.36	
Majority		18,911	34.30	
Turnout		55,150	73.49	
Conservative hold		Swing		

General election 1987: Grantham
Party	Candidate	Votes	%	±%
Conservative	Douglas Hogg	33,988	57.06	
Liberal	James Heppell	12,685	21.29	
Labour	Maurice Gent	12,197	20.48	
Green	Patricia Hewis	700	1.18	New
Majority		21,303	35.77	
Turnout		59,570	74.99	
Conservative hold		Swing		

=== Elections in the 1990s ===
General election 1992: Grantham
Party	Candidate	Votes	%	±%
Conservative	Douglas Hogg	37,194	56.2	−0.9
Labour Co-op	Steven Taggart	17,606	26.6	+6.1
Liberal Democrats	James Heppell	9,882	14.9	−6.4
Liberal	John D. Hiley	1,500	2.3	New
Majority		19,588	29.6	−6.2
Turnout		66,182	79.2	+4.2
Conservative hold		Swing	−3.5	

== See also ==
- List of parliamentary constituencies in Lincolnshire

== Notes and references ==
Craig, F. W. S. (1983). British parliamentary election results 1918–1949 (3 ed.). Chichester: Parliamentary Research Services. ISBN 0-900178-06-X.

== Sources ==
- D Brunton & D H Pennington, Members of the Long Parliament (London: George Allen & Unwin, 1954)
- Cobbett's Parliamentary history of England, from the Norman Conquest in 1066 to the year 1803 (London: Thomas Hansard, 1808)
- J E Neale, The Elizabethan House of Commons (London: Jonathan Cape, 1949)
