= Algernon Tollemache =

British gentleman and politician

Algernon Gray Tollemache
- Born: 24 September 1805; Petersham
- Died: 16 January 1892 (aged 86)
- Occupations: MP for Grantham; Land speculator; Financier
- Spouse: Frances Louisa Halliday
- Parent(s): William Tollemache, Lord Huntingtower and Catherine Gray

Algernon Gray Tollemache (24 September 1805 – 16 January 1892, London) was a British gentleman and politician. He was the sixth and youngest son of William Tollemache, Lord Huntingtower and Catherine Gray.

== Career ==
He was Member of Parliament for Grantham from 1832 to 1837. During this time he became interested in the New Zealand Company and purchased several sections of land in Nelson and 34 in Wellington. In 1849, he travelled on one of the earliest ships to New Zealand and settled in Wellington. He also financed many small farmers. Amongst those he financed were Henry Robert Russell and Donald McLean. Having amassed a significant fortune, he returned to England.

== Family and legacy ==
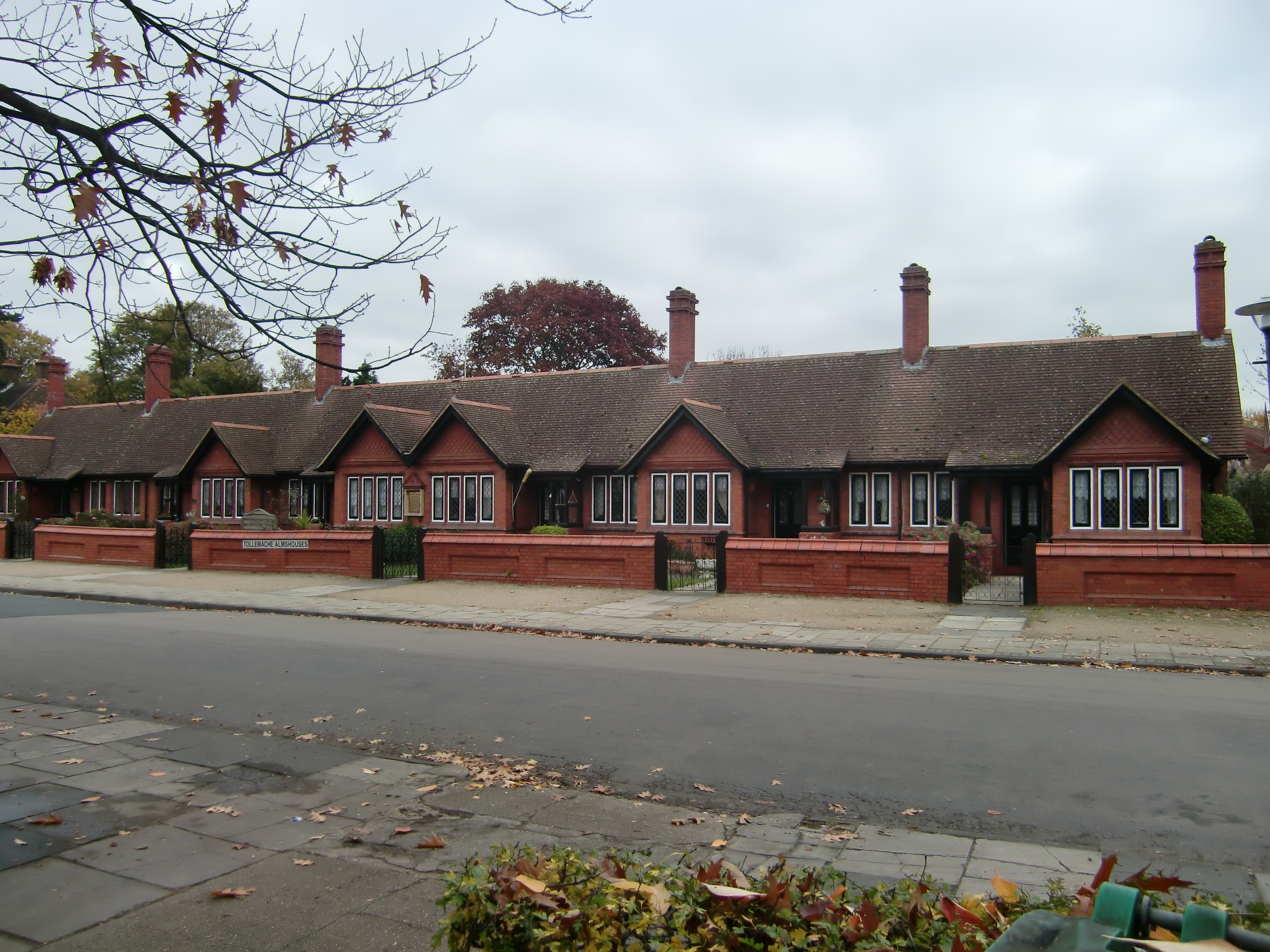
The Algernon Tollemache Almshouses, Ham, London erected in memory of Algernon Gray Tollemache in 1892 by his widow

When his elder brother, Lionel, inherited the Dysart title and the Tollemache family estates in 1840, Algernon and another brother, Frederick, were invited to manage the estates at Ham and Buckminster. Along with Charles Hanbury-Tracy, husband to Frederick's younger daughter, Ada, the three were nominated as the Dysart Trustees for the 21 years to 1899 following Lionel's death.

On 28 September 1857, Algernon married his first cousin Frances Louisa Halliday (1804–1893), daughter of Charles Tollemache and Gertrude Florinda Gardiner, and widow of George Richard Halliday who had died in 1855. By then in their mid fifties, the couple had no children.

In 1881, Algernon and Frances were living at Ham House but in the years prior to Algernon's death they lived at Wick House, on Richmond Hill.

Tollemache died on 16 January 1892 and was laid to rest in the family plot of Petersham Parish Church. He left his fortune to his niece Ada, Lady Sudeley. He also left £500 to the poor, a sum augmented by gifts of £100 each from his wife and his elder brother's grandson, the Earl of Dysart.

Tollemache's fortune and probate was the subject of much interest. A claim by the English courts for probate duty on his investments in New Zealand was contested by his executors on the grounds that it did not form part of his English estate and that duty had already been paid on it in New Zealand. The court initially found in the executors' favour. The decision was subsequently overturned and further appeal to the House of Lords refused.

=== Almshouses ===
In 1892 his widow, Frances Louisa Tollemache, founded six almshouses in Ham, London in his memory, with an endowment of £16,000 to support three couples and three single residents. She died shortly afterwards the following year.

== Sources ==
- Descendants of Sir Robert de Manners, of Etal
- Leigh Rayment's Peerage Pages

Parliament of the United Kingdom
Preceded by Glynne Earle Welby; James Hughes	Member of Parliament for Grantham; 1832–1837; With: Glynne Earle Welby	Succeeded by Glynne Earle Welby; Frederick James Tollemache
