= Sir Montague Cholmeley, 1st Baronet =

British politician and baronet

Member of Parliament for Grantham
- In office 1820–1826 Serving with Edward Cust
- Monarch: King George III
- Preceded by: Edward Cust
- Succeeded by: Frederick James Tollemache and Montague Cholmeley
- Parliamentary group: Liberal
- Constituency: Grantham

High Sheriff of Lincolnshire
- In office 1805–1805

Sir Montague Cholmeley, 1st Baronet (20 March 1772 – 10 March 1831) was a British politician and baronet. He was the member of parliament for Grantham from 1820 to 1826.

== Early life and family ==
Montague Cholmeley was born on 20 March 1772, the eldest son of Montague Cholmeley, of Easton, and Sarah Sibthorp, daughter of Humphry Sibthorp of Canwick, Professor of botany of Oxford University and his first wife Sarah Waldo. Cholmeley was educated at Magdalen College, Oxford, and graduated with a Bachelor of Arts (BA) in 1794. He proceeded to Master of Arts (MA) in 1808. In 1810, he was awarded a Doctor of Civil Law (DCL).

He married twice; firstly, Elizabeth Harrison, daughter of John Harrison, on 14 September 1801. They had three daughters and three sons. Elizabeth died in 1822, and Cholmeley married secondly Catherine Way, fourth daughter of Benjamin Way on 26 March 1826. He was succeeded in the baronetcy by his oldest son Montague.

== Career ==
Cholmeley was High Sheriff of Lincolnshire in 1805 and sat as member of parliament (MP) for Grantham from 1820 until 1826, when he retired in favour of his son. In 1819, Cholmeley was vice-president of the London Society for Promoting Christianity Amongst the Jews (a Jewish Christian missionary society now known as the Church's Ministry Among Jewish People or CMJ). He was created a baronet, of Easton, in the County of Lincoln on 4 March 1806.

He is buried in Stoke Rochford in Lincolnshire with a monument by Robert Blore.

Parliament of the United Kingdom
Preceded by Edward Cust; James Hughes	Member of Parliament for Grantham; 1820 – 1826; With: Edward Cust	Succeeded by Frederick James Tollemache; Montague Cholmeley
Baronetage of the United Kingdom
New creation	Baronet (of Easton); 1806–1831	Succeeded by Montague Cholmeley
