= Frederick Tollemache =

British politician (1804-1888)

Frederick James Tollemache
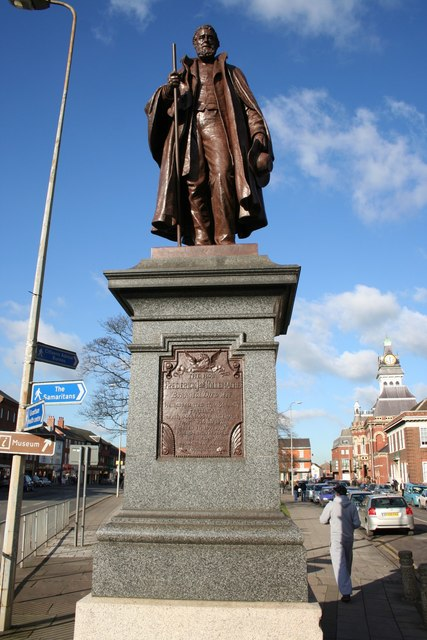
- Statue of Frederick Tollemache in Grantham, erected 1891

Member of Parliament for Grantham
- In office 1826–1830
- Preceded by: Edward Cust, Sir Montague Cholmeley, 1st Baronet
- Succeeded by: Sir Montague Cholmeley, 2nd Baronet, Glynne Earle Welby
- In office 1837–1852
- Preceded by: Algernon Gray Tollemache, Glynne Earle Welby
- Succeeded by: Glynne Earle Welby, Lord Montagu William Graham
- In office 1857–1865
- Preceded by: Sir Glynne Earle Welby, 3rd Baronet, Lord Montagu William Graham
- Succeeded by: William Earle Welby-Gregory, Sir John Thorold, 12th Baronet
- In office 1868–1874
- Preceded by: Sir John Thorold, 12th Baronet, Edmund Turnor
- Succeeded by: Sir Hugh Cholmeley, 3rd Baronet, Henry Francis Cockayne Cust

Personal details
- Born: 16 April 1804
- Died: 2 July 1888 (aged 84) Ham House
- Spouse(s): Sarah-Maria Bomford (m. 1831, d. 1835); Isabella Anne Forbes (m. 1847, d. 1850)
- Relations: Son of William Tollemache, Lord Huntingtower
- Children: Louisa Maria Tollemache, Ada Maria Katherine Tollemache
- Occupation: Politician
- Known for: Director of the New Zealand Company

Frederick James Tollemache (16 April 1804 – 2 July 1888, Ham House) was a British gentleman and politician. He was the fifth son of William Tollemache, Lord Huntingtower and Catherine Gray.

Through the interest of his father, he was several times Member of Parliament for Grantham from 1826 to 1874.

On 26 August 1831, he married Sarah-Maria Bomford (d. 1835), by whom he had one daughter:

- Louisa Maria Tollemache (27 August 1832 – 16 May 1863), died unmarried

On 4 September 1847, he married Isabella Anne Forbes (d. 1850), by whom he had one daughter, the writer:

- Ada Maria Katherine Tollemache (21 June 1848 – 6 January 1928), married on 9 May 1868 at Ham House to Charles Hanbury-Tracy, 4th Baron Sudeley.

He was a director of the New Zealand Company, and Manners Street, in Wellington, New Zealand is named for him. (His family did not adopt the surname of Tollemache until 1821).

Parliament of the United Kingdom
Preceded by Edward Cust; Sir Montague Cholmeley, 1st Bt	Member of Parliament for Grantham; 1826 – 1830; With: Montague Cholmeley	Succeeded by Montague Cholmeley; Glynne Earle Welby
Preceded by Glynne Earle Welby; Algernon Gray Tollemache	Member of Parliament for Grantham; 1837 – 1852; With: Glynne Earle Welby	Succeeded by Glynne Earle Welby; Lord Montagu William Graham
Preceded by Sir Glynne Earle Welby, Bt; Lord Montagu William Graham	Member of Parliament for Grantham; 1857 – 1865; With: William Earle Welby-Gregory	Succeeded by William Earle Welby-Gregory; John Henry Thorold
Preceded by Sir John Thorold, Bt; Edmund Turnor	Member of Parliament for Grantham; 1868 – 1874; With: Sir Hugh Cholmeley, Bt	Succeeded by Sir Hugh Cholmeley, Bt; Henry Francis Cockayne Cust
