= Discovery of human antiquity =

Scientific discovery in the middle of the 19th century

The discovery of human antiquity was a major achievement of science in the middle of the 19th century, and the foundation of scientific paleoanthropology. The antiquity of man, human antiquity, or in simpler language the age of the human race, are names given to the series of scientific debates it involved, which with modifications continue in the 21st century. These debates have clarified and given scientific evidence, from a number of disciplines, towards solving the basic question of dating the first human being.

Controversy was very active in this area in parts of the 19th century, with some dormant periods also. A key date was the 1859 re-evaluation of archaeological evidence that had been published 12 years earlier by Boucher de Perthes. It was then widely accepted, as validating the suggestion that man was much older than had previously been believed, for example than the 6,000 years implied by some traditional chronologies.

In 1863 T. H. Huxley argued that man was an evolved species; and in 1864 Alfred Russel Wallace combined natural selection with the issue of antiquity. The arguments from science for what was then called the "great antiquity of man" became convincing to most scientists, over the following decade. The separate debate on the antiquity of man had in effect merged into the larger one on evolution, being simply a chronological aspect. It has not ended as a discussion, however, since the current science of human antiquity is still in flux.

== Contemporary formulations ==
Modern science has no single answer to the question of how old humanity is. What the question now means indeed depends on choosing genus or species in the required answer. It is thought that the genus of man has been around for ten times as long as our species. Currently, fresh examples of (extinct) species of the genus Homo are still being discovered, so that definitive answers are not available. The consensus view is that human beings are one species, the only existing species of the genus. With the rejection of polygenism for human origins, it is asserted that this species had a definite and single origin in the past. (That assertion leaves aside the point whether the origin meant is of the current species, however. The multiregional hypothesis allows the origin to be otherwise.) The hypothesis of recent African origin of modern humans is now widely accepted, and states that anatomically modern humans had a single origin, in Africa.

The genus Homo is now estimated to be about 2.3 to 2.4 million years old, with the appearance of H. habilis; meaning that the existence of all types of humans has been within the Quaternary.

The spread of Homo sapiens, from the red area, over the last 100,000 years, represented with geographical areas for Neanderthals (ocher) and early hominids (yellow). H. sapiens replaced other species of the genus Homo, over a long period of time.

Once the question is reformulated as dating the transition of the evolution of H. sapiens from a precursor species, the issue can be refined into two further questions. These are: the analysis and dating of the evolution of Archaic Homo sapiens, and of the evolution from "archaic" forms of the species H. sapiens sapiens. The second question is given an answer in two parts: anatomically modern humans are thought to be about 300,000 years old, with behavioral modernity dating back to 40,000 or 50,000 years ago. The first question is still subject to debates on its definition.

== Historical debates ==
Discovering the age of the first human is one facet of anthropogeny, the study of human origins, and a term dated by the Oxford English Dictionary to 1839 and the Medical Dictionary of Robert Hooper. Given the history of evolutionary thought, and the history of paleontology, the question of the antiquity of man became quite natural to ask at around this period. It was by no means a new question, but it was being asked in a new context of knowledge, particularly in comparative anatomy and palaeontology. The development of relative dating as a principled method allowed deductions of chronology relative to events tied to fossils and strata. This meant, though, that the issue of the antiquity of man was not separable from other debates of the period, on geology and foundations of scientific archaeology.

The first strong scientific arguments for the antiquity of man as very different from accepted biblical chronology were certainly also strongly controverted. Those who found the conclusion unacceptable could be expected to examine the whole train of reasoning for weak points. This can be seen, for example, in the Systematic Theology of Charles Hodge (1871–3).

For a period, once the scale of geological time had become clear in the 19th century, the "antiquity of man" stood for a theory opposed to the "modern origin of man", for which arguments of other kinds were put forward. The choice was logically independent of monogenism versus polygenism; but monogenism with the modern origin implied time scales on the basis of the geographical spread, physical differences and cultural diversity of humans. The choice was also logically independent of the notion of transmutation of species, but that was considered to be a slow process.

William Benjamin Carpenter wrote in 1872 of a fixed conviction of the "modern origin" as the only reason for resisting the human creation of flint implements. Henry Williamson Haynes writing in 1880 could call the antiquity of man "an established fact".

=== Theological debates ===
The Biblical account included

- the story of the Garden of Eden and the descent of humans from a single couple;
- the story of the universal biblical Flood, after which all humans descended from Noah and his wife, and all animals from those saved in the Ark;
- genealogies providing in theory a way of dating events in the Old Testament (see Genealogy of the Bible).

These points were debated by scholars as well as theologians. Biblical literalism was not a given in the medieval and early modern periods, for Christians or Jews.

==== Human origins and the "universal deluge" debated ====
The Flood could explain extinctions of species at that date, on the hypothesis that the Ark had not contained all species of animal. A Flood that was not universal, on the other hand, had implications for the biblical theory of races and Noah's sons. The theory of catastrophism, which was as much secular as theological in attitude, could be used in analogous ways.

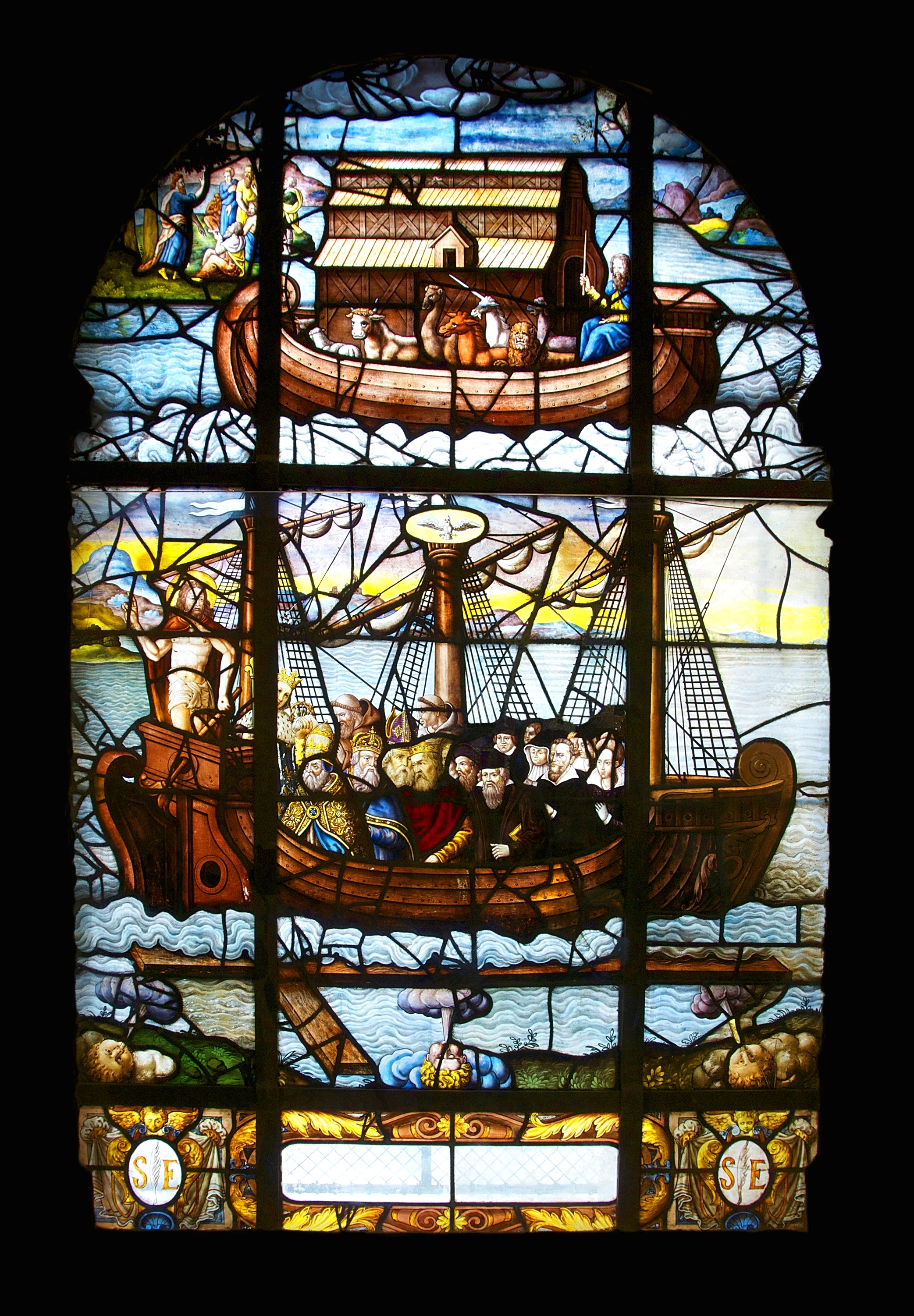
Noah's Ark, a stained glass window of the earlier 17th century, Church of Saint-Étienne-du-Mont, in Paris.

There was interest in matters arising from modification of the biblical narrative, therefore, and it was fuelled by the new knowledge of the world in early modern Europe, and then by the growth of the sciences. One hypothesis was of people not descended from Adam. This hypothesis of polygenism (no unique origin of humans) implied nothing on the antiquity of man, but the issue was implicated in counter-arguments, for monogenism.

==== La Peyrère and the completeness of the Biblical account ====
Isaac La Peyrère appealed in formulating his Preadamite theory of polygenism to Jewish tradition; it was intended to be compatible with the biblical creation of man. It was rejected by many contemporary theologians. This idea of humans before Adam had been current in earlier Christian scholars and those of unorthodox and heretical beliefs; La Peyrère's significance was his synthesis of the dissent. Influentially, he revived the classical idea of Marcus Terentius Varro, preserved in Censorinus, of a three-fold division of historical time into "uncertain" (to a universal flood), "mythical", and "historical" (with certain chronology).

==== Debate on race ====
The biblical narrative had implications for ethnology (division into Hamitic, Japhetic and Semitic peoples), and had its defenders, as well as those who felt it made significant omissions. Matthew Hale wrote his Primitive Origination of Mankind (1677) against La Peyrère, it has been suggested, in order to defend the propositions of a young human race and universal Flood, and the Native Americans as descended from Noah. Anthony John Maas writing in the 1913 Catholic Encyclopedia commented that pro-slavery sentiment indirectly supported the Preadamite theories of the middle of the 19th century. The antiquity of man found support in the opposed theories of monogenism of this time that justified abolitionism by discrediting scientific racism.

Already in the 18th century polygenism was applied as a theory of race (see Scientific racism#Blumenbach and Buffon). A variant racist Preadamism was introduced, in particular by Reginald Stuart Poole (The Genesis of the Earth and of Man, London, 1860) and Dominic M'Causland (Adam and the Adamite, or the Harmony of Scripture and Ethnology, London, 1864). They followed the views of Samuel George Morton, Josiah C. Nott, George Gliddon, and Louis Agassiz; and maintained that Adam was the progenitor of the Caucasian race, while the other races descended from Preadamite ancestry.

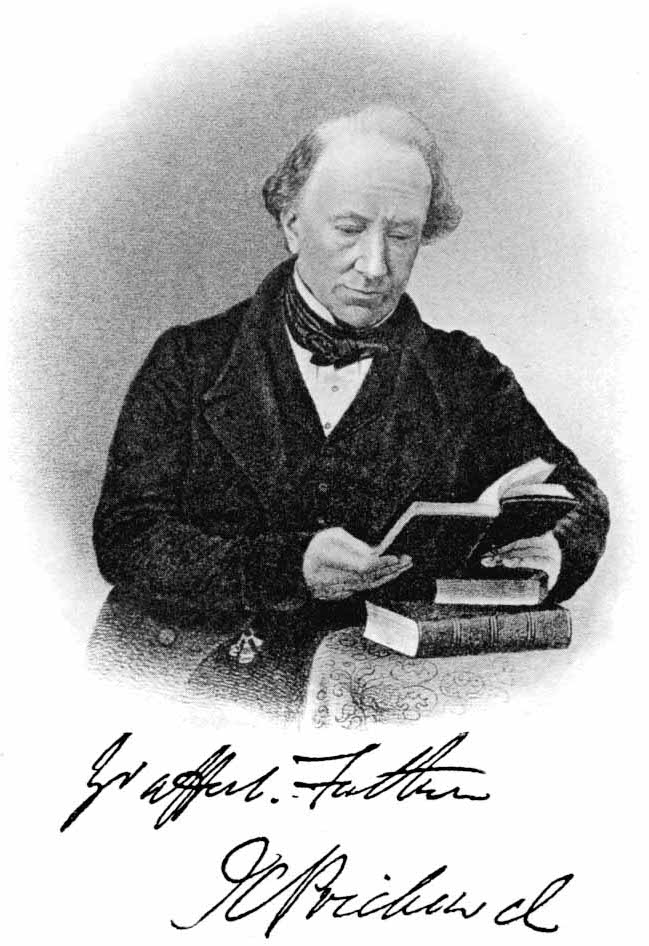
James Cowles Prichard, English Quaker ethnologist and defender of biblical monogenism.

James Cowles Prichard argued against polygenism, wishing to support the account drawn from the Book of Genesis of a single human origin. In particular he argued that humans were one species, using the interfertility criterion of hybridity. By his use of a form of natural selection to argue for change of human skin colour as a historical process, he also implied a time scale long enough for such a process to have produced the observed differences.

==== Incompatible views of chronology ====
The Early Christian Church contested claims that pagan traditions were older than that of the Bible. Theophilus of Antioch and Augustine of Hippo both argued against Egyptian views that the world was at least 100,000 years old. This figure was too high to be compatible with biblical chronology. One of La Peyrère's propositions, that China was at least 10,000 years old, gained wider currency; Martino Martini had provided details of traditional Chinese chronology, from which it was deduced by Isaac Vossius that Noah's Flood was local rather than universal.

One of the considerations detected in La Peyrère by Otto Zöckler was concern with the Antipodes and their people: were they pre-Adamites, or indeed had there been a second "Adam of the Antipodes"? In a 19th-century sequel, Alfred Russel Wallace in an 1867 book review pointed to the Pacific Islanders as posing a problem for those holding both to monogenism and a recent date for human origins. In other words, he took migration from an original location to remote islands that are now populated to imply a long time scale. A significant consequence of the recognition of the antiquity of man was the greater scope for conjectural history, in particular for all aspects of diffusionism and social evolutionism.

==== Creation of man in a world not ready ====
While extinction of species came with the development of geology to be widely accepted in the early 19th century, there was resistance on theological grounds to extinctions after the creation of man. It was argued, in particular in the 1820s and 1830s, that man would not be created into an "imperfect" world as far as design of its collection of species was concerned. This reasoning cut across that which was conclusive for the science of the antiquity of man, a generation later.

=== Archaeological context ===
The late 18th century was a period in which French and German caves were explored, and remains taken for study: caving was in fashion, if speleology was only in its infancy, and the St. Beatus Caves, for example, attracted many visitors. Caves were a theme of the art of the time, also.

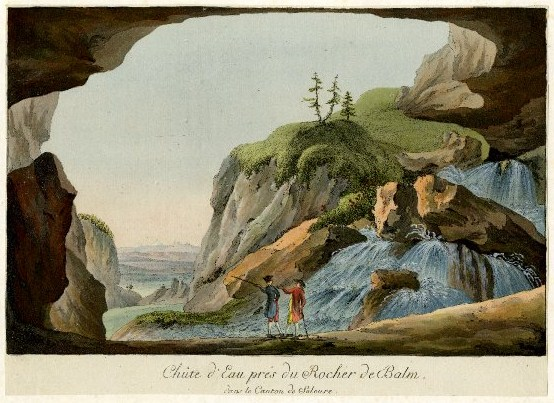
Waterfall seen from a cave in Solothurn, Switzerland; engraving of the later 18th century.

Cave remains proved of great importance to the science of the antiquity of man. Stalagmite formation was a clearcut mechanism of formation of fossils, and its stratigraphy could be understood. Other sites of importance were associated with alluvial deposits of gravel and clay, or peat. The early example of the Gray's Inn Lane Hand Axe was from gravel in a bed of a tributary of the River Thames, but remained isolated for about a century.

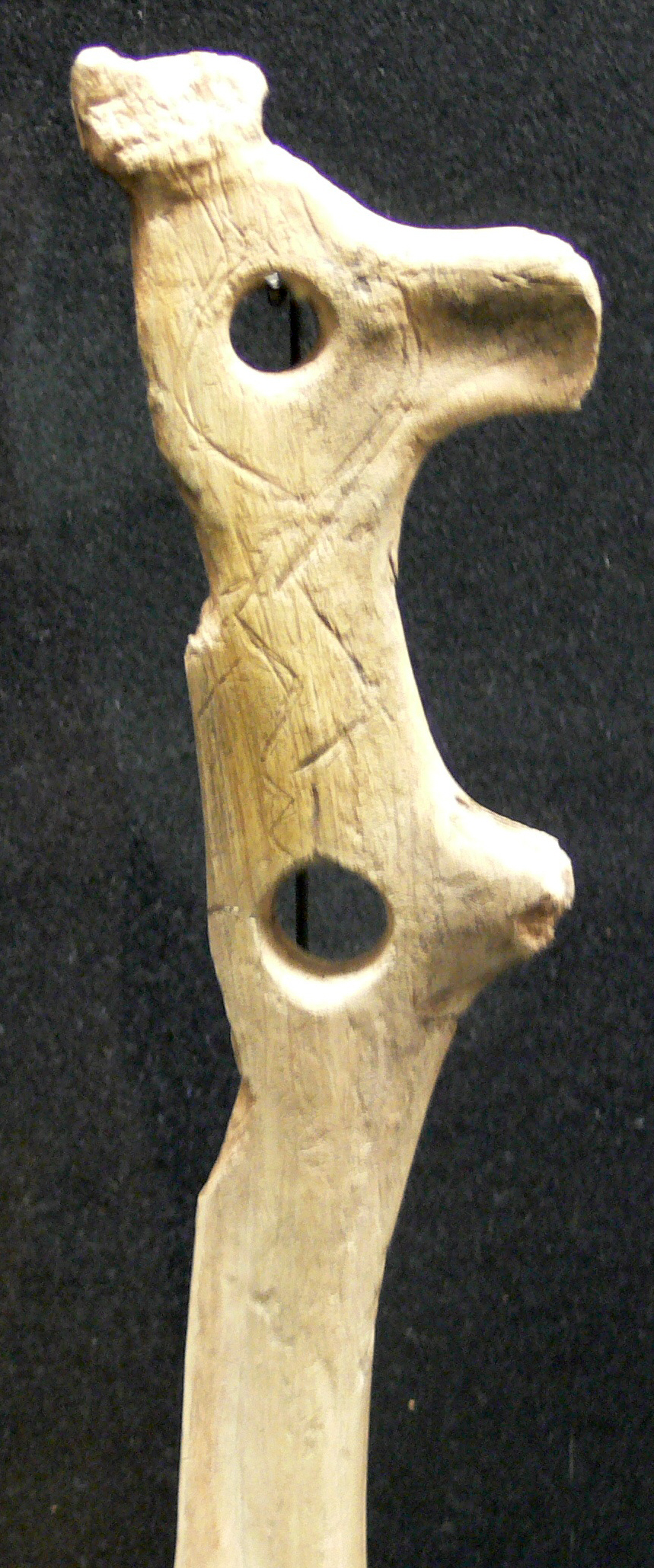
Palaeolithic pierced baton spear thrower from Kesslerloch cave, Thayngen, Switzerland.

The three-age system was in place from about 1820, in the form given to it by Christian Jürgensen Thomsen in his work on the collections that became the National Museum of Denmark. He published his ideas in 1836. Postulating cultural change, in itself and without explaining a rate of change, did not generate reasons to revise traditional chronology. But the concept of Stone Age artifacts became current. Thomsen's book in Danish, Ledetraad til Nordisk Oldkyndighed, was translated into German (Leitfaden zur Nordischen Alterthumskunde, 1837), and English (Guide to Northern Archæology, 1848).

John Frere's 1797 discovery of the Hoxne handaxe helped to initiate the 19th century debate, but it started in earnest around 1810. There were then a number of false starts relating to different European sites. William Buckland misjudged what he had found in 1823 with the misnamed Red Lady of Paviland, and explained away the mammoth remains with the find. He also was dismissive of the Kent's Cavern findings of John MacEnery in the later 1820s. In 1829 Philippe-Charles Schmerling discovered a Neanderthal fossil skull (at Engis). At that point, however, its significance was not recognised, and Rudolf Virchow consistently opposed the theory that it was very old. The 1847 book Antiquités Celtiques et Antediluviennes by Boucher de Perthes about Saint-Acheul was found unconvincing in its presentation, until it was reconsidered about a decade later.

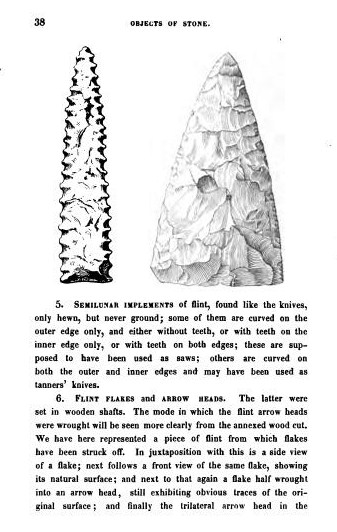
Page showing flint implements from Guide to Northern Archæology (1848), English translation by Francis Egerton, 1st Earl of Ellesmere, from the Danish Ledetraad til Nordisk Oldkyndighed (1836) of Christian Jürgensen Thomsen.

The debate moved on only in the context of

- further stone tools that were admitted to be made by Stone Age man, found
- on sites where the stratigraphy could be argued to be clear and undisturbed, with
- remains of animals that were (in the consensus of palaeontologists) now extinct.

It was this combination, "extinct faunal remains" + "human artifacts", that provided the evidence that came to be seen as crucial. A sudden acceleration of research was seen from mid-1858, when the Geological Society set up a "cave committee". Besides Hugh Falconer who had pressed for it, the committee comprised Charles Lyell, Richard Owen, William Pengelly, Joseph Prestwich, and Andrew Ramsay.

=== Debate on uniformity and change ===
On the one hand, lack of uniformity in prehistory is what gave science traction on the question of the antiquity of man; and, on the other hand, there were at the time theories that tended to rule out certain types of lack of regularity. John Lubbock outlined in 1890 the way the antiquity of man had in his time been established as derived from change in prehistory: in fauna, geography and climate. The hypotheses required to establish that these changes were facts of prehistory were themselves in tension with the uniformitarianism that was held to by some scientists; therefore the protean concept "uniformitarianism" was adjusted to accommodate the past changes that could be established.

Zoological uniformity on earth was debated already in the early eighteenth century. George Berkeley argued in Alciphron that the lack of human artifacts in deeper excavations suggested a recent origin of man. Evidence of absence was, of course, seen as problematic to establish. Gottfried Leibniz in his Protogaea produced arguments against identification of a species via morphology, without evidence of descent (having in mind a characterisation of humans by possession of reason); and against the discreteness of species and their extinction.

Uniformitarianism held the field against the competitor theories of Neptunism and catastrophism, which partook of Romantic science and theological cosmogony; it established itself as the successor of Plutonism, and became the foundation of modern geology. Its tenets were correspondingly firmly held. Charles Lyell put forward at one point views on what were called "uniformity of kind" and "uniformity of degree" that were incompatible with what was argued later. Lyell's theory, in fact, was of a "steady state" geology, which he deduced from his principles. This went too far in restricting actual geological processes, to a predictable closed system, if it ruled out ice ages (see ice ages#Causes of ice ages), as became clearer not long after Lyell's Principles of Geology appeared (1830–3). Of Lubbock's three types of change, the geographical included the theory of migration over land bridges in biogeography, which in general acted as an explanatory stopgap, rather than in most cases being one supported by science. Sea level changes were easier to justify.

=== Glacial conditions ===
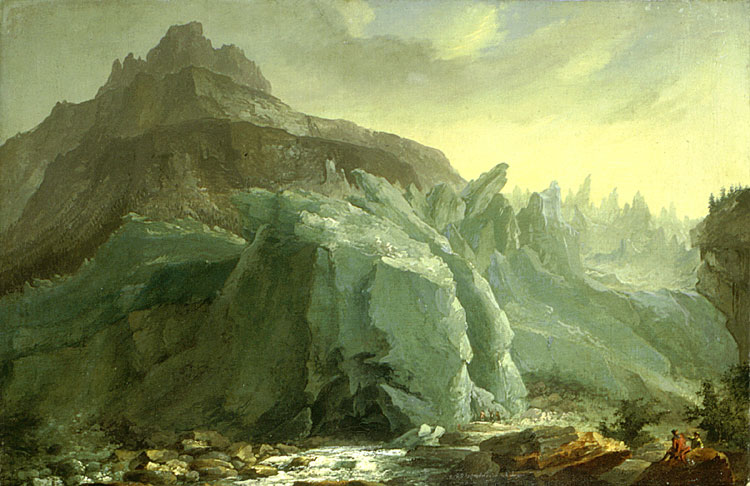
The Grindelwald Glacier in Switzerland, 1774 painting by Caspar Wolf.

The identification of ice ages was important context for the antiquity of man because it was accepted that certain mammals had died out with the last of the ice ages which were clearly marked in the geological record. Georges Cuvier's Recherches sur les ossements fossiles de quadrupèdes (1812) had accepted facts of the extinctions of mammals that were to be relevant to human antiquity. The concept of an ice age was proposed in 1837 by Louis Agassiz, and it opened the way to the study of glacial history of the Quaternary. William Buckland came to see evidence of glaciers in what he had taken to be remains of the biblical Flood. It seemed adequately proved that the woolly mammoth and woolly rhinoceros were mammals of the ice ages, and had ceased to exist with the ice ages: they inhabited Europe when it was tundra, and not afterwards. In fact such extinct mammals were typically found in diluvium as it was then called (distinctive gravel or boulder clay).

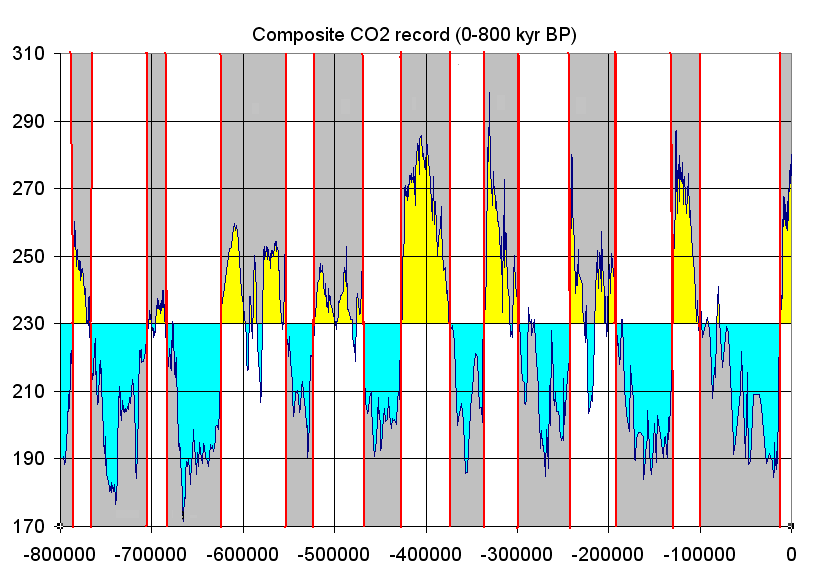
Glacial and interglacial cycles as represented by atmospheric CO_{2}, measured from ice core samples going back 800,000 years.

Given that the animals were associated with these strata, establishing the date of the strata could be by geological arguments, based on uniformity of stratigraphy; and so the animals' extinction was dated. An extinction can still strictly only be dated on assumptions, as evidence of absence; for a particular site, however, the argument can be from local extinction.

Neither Agassiz nor Buckland adopted the new views on the antiquity of man.

=== Acceptance of human association with extinct animal species ===
Boucher de Perthes had written up discoveries in the Somme valley in 1847. Joseph Prestwich and John Evans in April 1859, and Charles Lyell with others also in 1859, made field trips to the sites, and returned convinced that humans had coexisted with extinct mammals. In general and qualitative terms, Lyell felt the evidence established the "antiquity of man": that humans were much older than the traditional assumptions had made them. His conclusions were shared by the Royal Society and other British learned institutions, as well as in France. It was this recognition of the early date of Acheulean handaxes that first established the scientific credibility of the deep antiquity of humans.

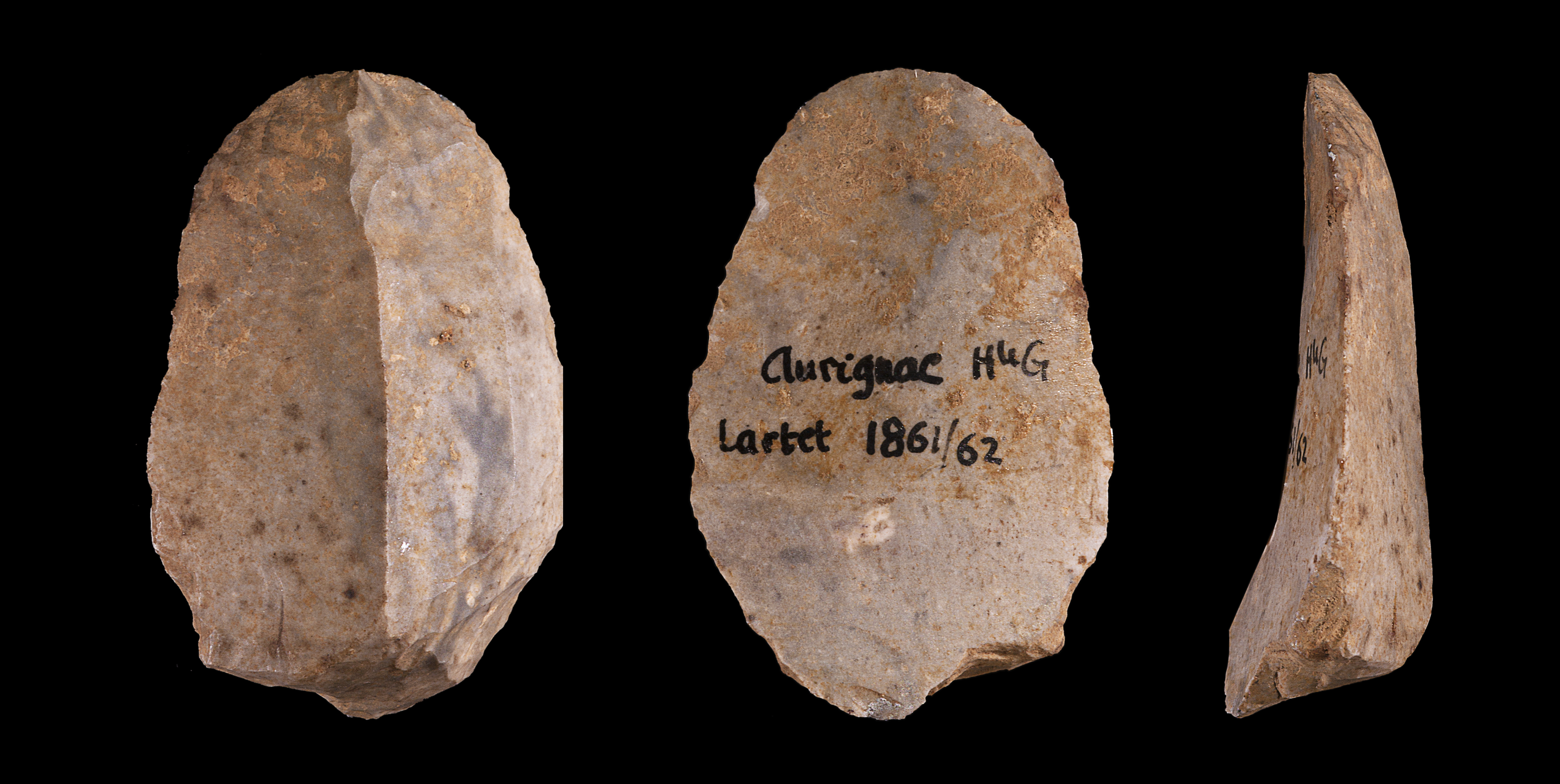
Flint implements found 1861/2 at Aurignac in the French Pyrénées by Édouard Lartet.

This debate was concurrent with that over the book On the Origin of Species, published in 1859, and was evidently related; but was not one in which Charles Darwin initially made his own views public. Consolidation of the "antiquity of man" required more work, with stricter methods; and this proved possible over the next two decades. The discoveries of Boucher de Perthes therefore motivated further researches to try to repeat and confirm the findings at other sites. Significant in this were excavations by William Pengelly at Brixham Cavern, and with a systematic approach at Kents Cavern (1865–1880). Another major project, which produced quicker findings, was that of Henry Christy and Édouard Lartet. Lartet in 1860 had published results from a cave near Massat (Ariège) claiming stone tool cuts on bones of extinct mammals, made when the bones were fresh.

== List of key sites for the 19th century debate ==
Site	Date(s)	Investigators	Findings and contemporary view	Image
Kingsbridge, London, England	1671	John Conyers	Gray's Inn Lane Hand Axe, mammoth teeth; theories about Roman elephants, not accepted by Conyers	
Hoxne, Suffolk, England	1797	John Frere	Handaxes. Published by the Society of Antiquaries, but the bones and shells remained unidentified.	
Goat's Hole Cave, Gower Peninsula, Wales	1823	William Buckland	"Red Lady of Paviland", mammoth remains	
Kents Cavern, Devon, England	1824	Thomas Northmore; John MacEnery; William Pengelly		
Bize-Minervois, France	1827	Paul Tournal	Paul Tournal (1805–1872), who became a pharmacist, investigated cave deposits in the Narbonne area. He used the neologism anté-historique. He found human remains with those of extinct animals, communicated with Georges Cuvier, and was met with incomprehension.	
Pondres, Gard, France	1828	Jules de Christol	Jules de Christol (1802–1861) found caves filled with mud and gravel, containing bones of hyaena, rhinoceros and humans. The contemporary deposition of bones was not accepted, by a commission under Cuvier; and pottery was found lower.	
Engis, Belgium	1829	Philippe-Charles Schmerling		
Saint-Acheul, Amiens, France	1847	Boucher de Perthes	Acheulean handaxes	
Brixham Cave, Devon, England	1858	William Pengelly		
Aurignac, France	1860	Édouard Lartet		
Vézère valley, Dordogne, France	1863	Édouard Lartet, Henry Christy		

== Further issues ==
=== Tertiary Man ===
When the science was considered reasonably settled as to the existence of "Quaternary Man" (humans of the Pleistocene), there remained the issue as to whether man had existed in the Tertiary, a now obsolete term used for the preceding geological period. The debate on the antiquity of man resonated in the later debate over eoliths, which were supposed proof of the existence of man in the Pliocene (during the Neogene). In this case the sceptical view won out.

== Publications ==
=== Publications of the central years of the debate ===
- Édouard Lartet, The Antiquity of Man in Western Europe (1860)
- ——, New Researches on the Coexistence of Man and of the Great Fossil Mammifers characteristic of the Last Geological Period (1861)
- Charles Lyell, Geological Evidences of the Antiquity of Man (1863). It was a major synthesis that discussed the issue of human antiquity, in parallel with the further issues of the Ice Ages and human evolution that promised to throw light on the origins of man.
- T. H. Huxley, Evidence as to Man's Place in Nature (1863)
- Alfred Russel Wallace, The Origin of Human Races and the Antiquity of Man Deduced from the Theory of 'Natural Selection' (1864)
- James Geikie, The Great Ice Age and its Relation to the Antiquity of Man (1874).

=== Publications of the latter stages of the debate ===
- John Patterson MacLean, A Manual of the Antiquity of Man (1877)
- James Cocke Southall, The Epoch of the Mammoth and the Apparition of man upon the Earth (1878)
- William Boyd Dawkins, Early Man in Britain and His Place in the Tertiary Period (1880)
- Richard Owen, Antiquity of Man as deduced from the Discovery of a Human Skeleton during Excavations of the Docks at Tilbury (1884)
- George Frederick Wright, The Ice Age in North America, and its Bearings upon the Antiquity of Man (1889)
- George Grant MacCurdy, Recent Discoveries Bearing on the Antiquity of Man in Europe (1910)
- George Frederick Wright, Origin and Antiquity of Man (1912)
- Arthur Keith, The Antiquity of Man (1915)

== See also ==
- Tool use by animals
- List of first human settlements
