= Kents Cavern =

Cave and archaeological site in the United Kingdom

- Site of Special Scientific Interest
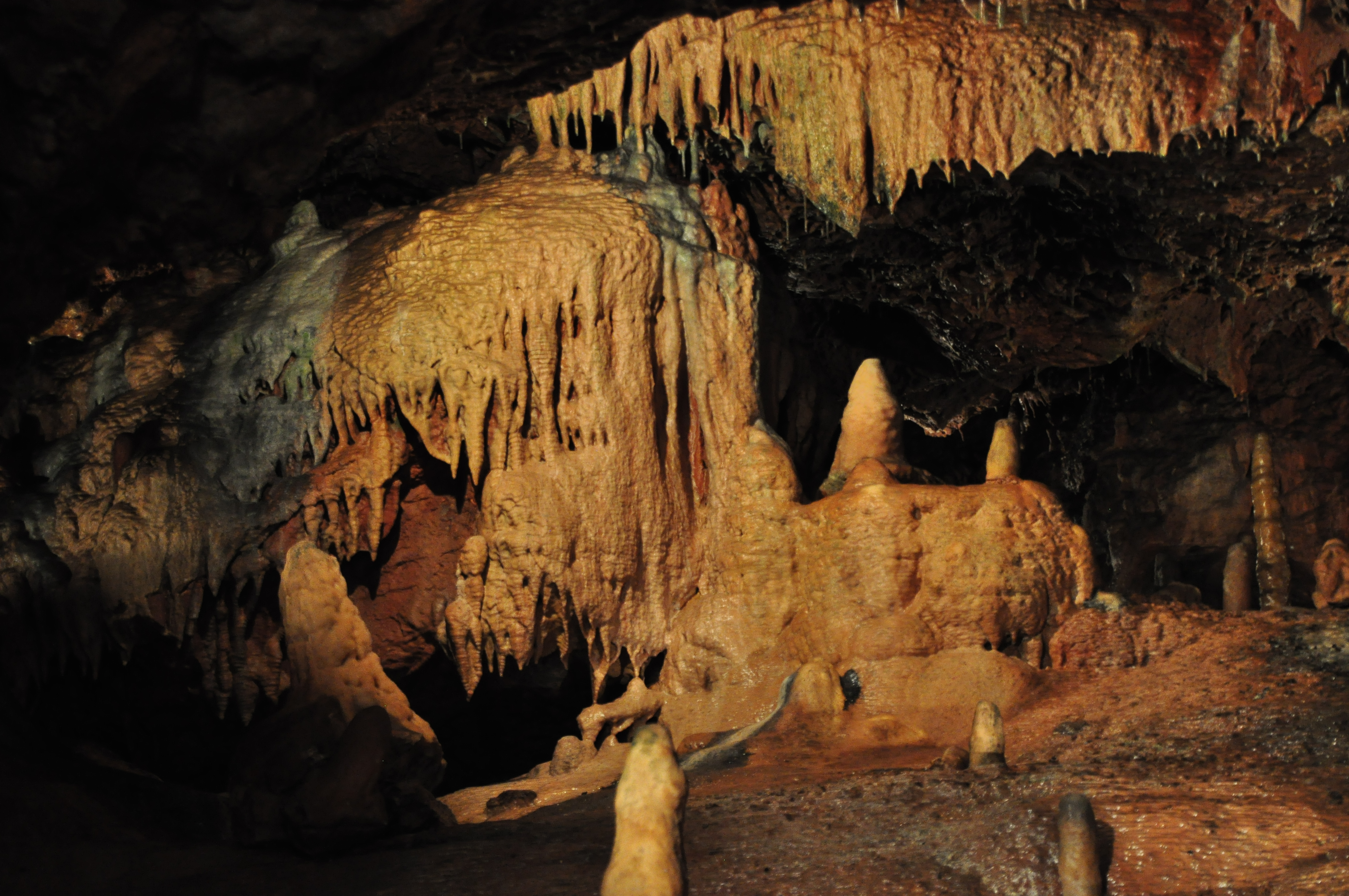
- Interior view of Kent's Cavern

- Location within Devon
- Location of Kents Cavern.
- Area of search: South Devon
- Grid reference: SX 934641
- Coordinates: 50.4682°N 3.5030°W
- Interest: Geological
- Area: 1.7 hectares (17,000 m^{2}; 183,000 sq ft)
- Notification date: 1952

Kents Cavern (also spelled Kent's Cavern) is a cave system in Torquay, Devon, England. It is notable both for its archaeological and geological features (as a karst feature in the Devonian limestone). The cave system is open to the public and has been a geological Site of Special Scientific Interest since 1952 and a Scheduled Ancient Monument since 1957.

== Geology ==
Kents Cavern was formed by erosion of rock that is part of the Torquay Limestone of Middle-Upper Devonian age, which is underlain by a unit of primarily grey mudstone, the Nordon Slate and overlain by the Gurrington Slate, a unit of purple and grey-green mudstone of Upper Devonian age, as well by much younger Permian aged New Red Sandstone. Kents Cavern probably formed during the Early Pleistocene, and has primarily been created by phreatic and secondarily by vadose processes. It consists of a complex of chambers and passageways. The cave sediment fill is probably Middle Pleistocene-Holocene age.

The lowest sediment layer, the "Red Sands", is probably fluvial in origin, and likely formed during the Cromerian during the Early Middle Pleistocene. The next above layer, the "Breccia", is a diamicton deposit consisting of a red mud matrix with clasts primarily of red sandstone, siltstone, slate and quartz, as well as fragments of rocks from the cave itself like stalagmites, that are poorly sorted and generally strongly angular to moderately angular (subangular). It likely accumulated in the cave as a result of solifluction processes during the Anglian Glaciation (Marine Isotope Stage/MIS 12, ~478-424,000 years ago), though it contains fossil remains (as well as stone tools) that likely predate the Anglian glaciation. The Breccia experienced some more movement during the MIS 10 glaciation ~350,000 years ago. The upper layers of the Breccia are overlain by layers of flowstone and other calcite deposits dubbed the "Crystalline Stalagmite", with the earliest layers of flowstone forming during MIS 11 ~400,000 years ago, though there was a major pulse of calcite deposition during MIS 9, around 300,000 years ago. The Breccia subsequently experienced some erosion after MIS 9, leaving a gap known as the "Vacuity" between the Breccia and the flowstone in parts of the cave.

The last major unit is the "Cave Earth" that formed during the Last Glacial Period largely during MIS 3, around 60-30,000 years ago, though some areas of Kents Cavern "Cave Earth" formed during MIS 2. The "Cave Earth" has been described as a "mixture of mud, sand and rock fragments". In the upper "Cave Earth" lies the "Black Band" a lens bed containing considerable amounts of diffusely spread charcoal as well as human artifacts. Deposition of calcite has been ongoing throughout the Holocene and is still actively occurring in parts of the cave. The uppermost layer of deposition in parts of the cave is now largely removed "Black Mould" of Holocene age, which while never properly characterised, contained "charcoal, ash, decayed organic material, leaf fall, shells" as well as Holocene human artifacts.

== Prehistory ==
=== Archaeology ===
==== Archaic human including Neanderthal occupation ====
Handaxes found in the "Breccia" layer of the cavern indicate that the area in the vicinity of the cave system was occupied during the Acheulean period of the Lower Paleolithic, no later than Marine Isotope Stage 12 (~478-424,000 years ago). A 2025 study suggesting they dated to Marine Isotope Stage 15, around 600,000 years ago, based on the relative crudeness of their manufacture and similarity to handaxes from other sites in Britain of a proposed MIS 15 age like those found at Lakenheath/Maidscross Hill, Warren Hill and Brandon Field. If correct, Kents Cavern is one of the oldest Palaeolithic localities in Britain, older than the famous Boxgrove site in Sussex.

Mousterian stone tools found in the cavern during excavations in the 19th century indicate that the cave was later occupied by Neanderthals during the late Middle Paleolithic (likely sometime roughly around 60-40,000 years ago). Most of these artifacts are now lost, though 45 remain, including "five bifaces, nine scrapers, possible awls/borers, and a variety of debitage including two Levallois flakes", which are either made of flint or greensand-derived chert. Given the partial and incomplete current state of the finds, it is difficult to provide conclusive answers about how Neanderthals used the cave, though from what remains "there is little evidence of on-site manufacture, and the whole appears to be a collection of artefacts taken to the cave during a number of relatively brief visits".

==== Modern human occupation ====
A prehistoric upper jawbone (maxilla) fragment of a modern human (Homo sapiens) was discovered in the cavern during a 1927 excavation by the Torquay Natural History Society and named Kents Cavern 4. The specimen is on display at the Torquay Museum.

In 1989, the fragment was radiocarbon dated to 36,400–34,700 years Before Present (BP), but a 2011 study that dated fossils from neighbouring strata produced an estimate of 44,200–41,500 years BP. The same study analysed the dental structure of the fragment and determined it to be Homo sapiens rather than Homo neanderthalensis, which would have made it the earliest anatomically modern human fossil yet discovered in Britain and northwestern Europe. In a response to this paper in 2012, the authors Mark White and Paul Pettitt wrote, "We urge caution over using a small selected sample of fauna from an old and poorly executed excavation in Kent's Cavern to provide a radiocarbon stratigraphy and age for a human fossil that cannot be dated directly, and we suggest that the recent dating should be rejected." A 2017 paper by some of the same authors of the 2011 study rebutted the concerns presented and again supported the 44,200–41,500 BP date.

A small number of Initial Upper Palaeolithic stone tools assigned to the Lincombian-Ranisian-Jerzmanowician complex (with the name "Lincombian" name deriving from Lincomb Hill on which Kent's Cavern is situated) have also been found in the cavern, which are likely older than 36,000 years ago and may be contemporaneous with the maxilla. Stone artifacts, including burins and scrapers from the cavern of Aurignacian type date to probably at earliest 37,000 years ago, though perhaps likely somewhat later. "Maisierian"-type tanged stone points indicate that the cavern was occupied by early Gravettian peoples, probably about 33,000 years ago. The "Black Band" of the upper "Cave Earth" contains younger Late Upper Palaeolithic Magdalenian tools of Creswellian type, including stone points, barbed points made of deer antler, a rod made of woolly mammoth ivory, along with human modified animal bones. The Creswellian occupation of the cavern has been radiocarbon dated to approximately 14,798 to 13,769 cal BP.

The "Black Mould" layer of the cavern contains artifacts indicating the cave was visited by humans throughout the Holocene, spanning from the Mesolithic to Roman and Medieval periods. A significant Mesolithic find is of a partial ulna, which dates to around 8,070 BP. The bone was fractured around the time of death and displays cut marks, which suggests it was possibly broken to extract the marrow, either as a ritual act and/or for the purposes of cannibalism.

=== Paleontology ===
==== Cave bears and Breccia mammal remains ====
During the Middle Pleistocene (Marine Isotope Stage 11, ~400,000 years ago) the caves were used as a hibernation den by cave bears (on the transition between the archaic Ursus deningeri and the later Ursus spelaeus) resulting in a considerable number of their remains being excavated from the "Breccia" layers cave. The remains of cave bears, and other animals, were distributed to museums around the world. Leeds Museums and Galleries have a large amount of Kent's Cavern bear material. The Royal Albert Memorial Museum, the Natural History Museum, Torquay Museum, Museum National D'Histoire Naturelle, the Smithsonian Institution, Museum Victoria, Hull and East Riding Museum, Bridport Museum, the Horniman Museum, the Oxford University Museum of Natural History, the University of Leicester, the Great North Museum, the Museum of Gloucester, the National Museum of Ireland, Bolton Museum and the Bath Royal Literary and Scientific Institution all look after remains from the caverns.

Other mammal remains in the Breccia include those of the large extinct lion Panthera fossilis, the archaic extinct water vole species Arvicola cantiana, the living tundra vole (Microtus oeconomus), as well as "Pitymys" gregaloides, an archaic member of the lineage leading to the living narrow-headed vole (Stenocranius gregalis). It has been suggested that at least the vole fossils date to MIS 13, around 500,000 years ago.

==== Cave hyena den, Homotherium teeth and Cave Earth fossils ====
During the Last Glacial Period (sometime between 90-25,000 years ago) during the deposition of the "Cave Earth", the cave served as a den site for cave hyenas. Remains of animals found in these layers include wild horse, juvenile woolly mammoth, woolly rhinoceros, steppe bison, reindeer and red deer, with these layers also containing the remains of wolves.

The cave was where the holotype canine teeth of the sabertooth cat Homotherium latidens were collected by John MacEnery in 1826, and formally described by Richard Owen in 1846. Later in the 19th century incisor teeth were also found in the cave. Kent's Cavern is one of only a handful of sites in Britain where Homotherium remains have been found. Isotopic analysis of the canine teeth of H. latidens found in Kent's Cavern indicates that they are isotopically distinct from other animal remains found in the cave. This, along with the absence of any other Homotherium remains in the cave, has led authors to suggest that the teeth were deliberately transported into the cave by humans during the Palaeolithic from further afield (possibly from mainland Europe), perhaps as a kind of trade good. The teeth are suggested to have experienced considerable weathering prior to being taken into Kent's Cavern, and it is unclear whether these teeth were taken from the remains of then-relatively recently dead Homotherium or subfossil remains of long-dead Homotherium individuals.

== Modern history ==
=== As an archaeological site ===
Kents Cavern is first recorded as Kents Hole Close on a 1659 deed when the land was leased to John Black. The earliest evidence of exploration of the caves in historic times is two inscriptions, "William Petre 1571" and "Robert Hedges 1688" engraved on stalagmites. The first recorded excavation was that of Thomas Northmore in 1824. Northmore's work attracted the attention of William Buckland, the first Reader in Geology at the University of Oxford, who sent a party including John MacEnery to explore the caves in an attempt to find evidence that Mithras was once worshipped in the area. MacEnery, the Roman Catholic chaplain at Torre Abbey, conducted systematic excavations between 1824 and 1829. When MacEnery reported to the British Association the discovery of flint tools below the stalagmites on the cave floor, his work was derided as contrary to Bishop James Ussher's Biblical chronology dating the Creation to 4004 BC.

In September 1845, the recently created Torquay Natural History Society requested permission from Sir Lawrence Palk to explore the caves to obtain fossils and artefacts for the planned Torquay Museum, and as a result, Edward Vivian and William Pengelly were allowed to conduct excavations between 1846 and 1858. Vivian reported to the Geological Society in 1847, but at the time, it was generally believed that early humans had entered the caves long after the formation of the cave structures examined. This changed when, in the Autumn of 1859, following the work of Pengelly at the Brixham Cavern and of Jacques de Perthes in France, the Royal Society, the Society of Antiquaries, and the British Association agreed that the excavations had established the antiquity of humanity.

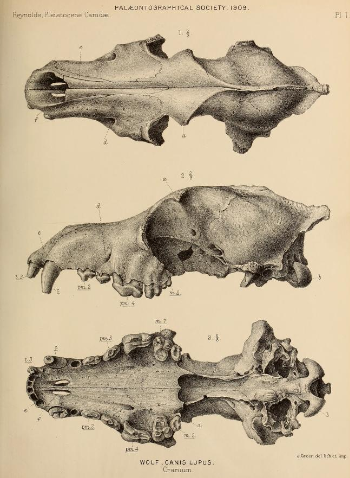
1866 record of a wolf cranium found in Kents Cavern

In 1865, the British Association created a committee, led by Pengelly, to fully explore the cave system over the course of fifteen years. It was Pengelly's party that discovered Robert Hedges' stalagmite inscription, and from the stalagmite's growth since that time deduced that human-created artefacts found under the formation could be half a million years old. Pengelly plotted the position of every bone, flint, and other artefact he discovered during the excavations and afterward continued working with the Torquay Natural History Society until his death in 1892 at his home less than 2 km from the caves.

=== As a tourist attraction ===
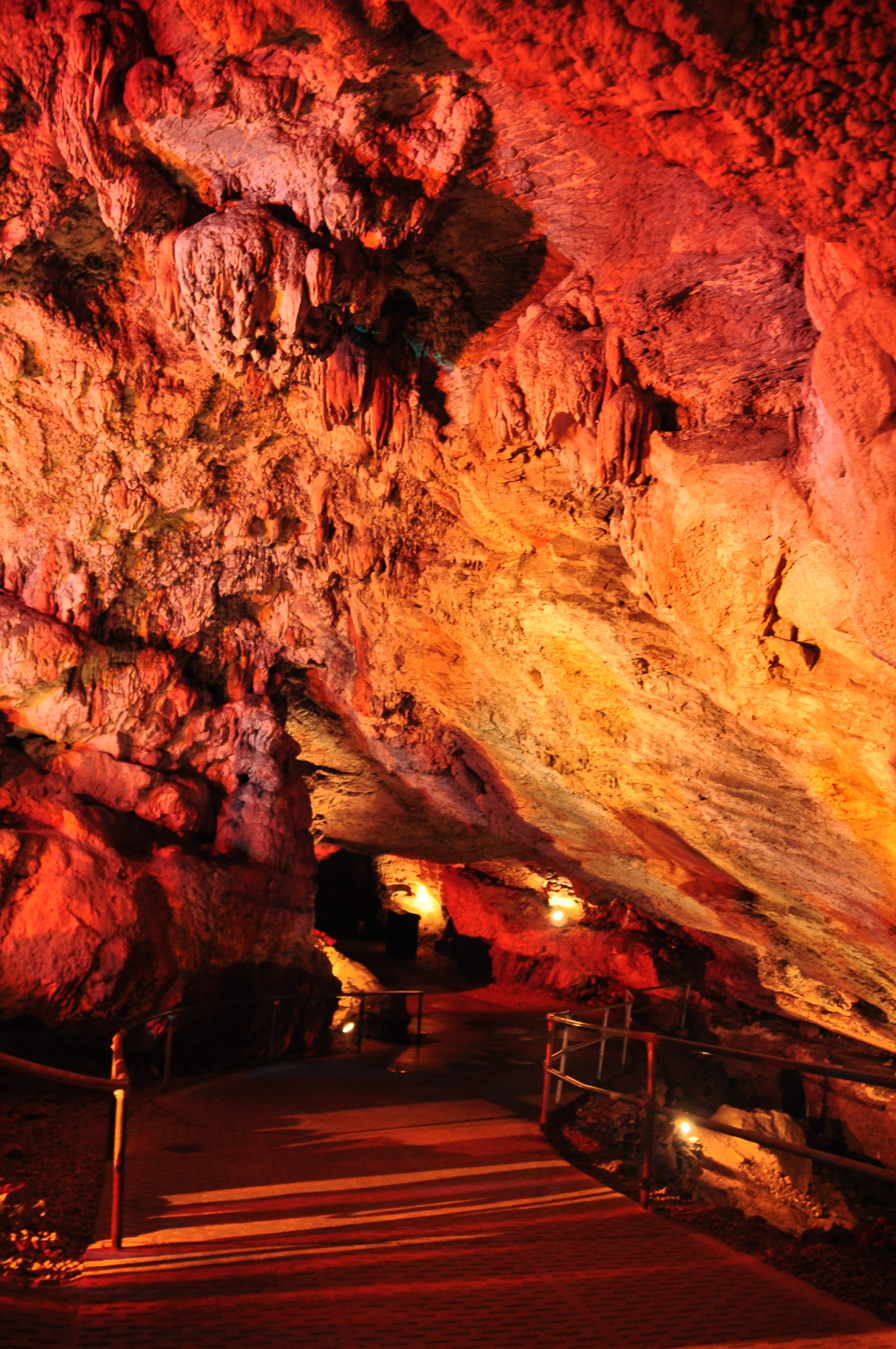
A tourist route through the cavern

In 1903, Kents Cavern, then part of Lord Haldon's estate, was sold to Francis Powe, a carpenter who originally used the caves as a workshop while making beach huts for the Torquay sea front. Powe's son, Leslie Powe, turned the caves into a tourist attraction by laying concrete paths, installing electric lighting, and building visitor facilities that later were improved, in turn, by his son John Powe. The caves, now owned by Nick Powe, celebrated 100 years of Powe family ownership on 23 August 2003 with special events including an archæological dig for children and a display by a cave rescue team. A year later, a new £500,000 visitor centre was opened, including a restaurant and gift shop.

Attracting 80,000 tourists a year, Kents Cavern is an important tourist attraction, and this was recognised in 2000 when it was awarded Showcave of the Year award and later in November 2005 when it was awarded a prize for being Torquay's Visitor Attraction of the year.

Kents Cavern is one of the most important geosites in the English Riviera Geopark, one of over 170 UNESCO Global Geoparks.

In 2023, Kents Cavern was put up for sale for up to £2,500,000 and bought by The Tudor Hotel Collection.

=== Kents Cavern in fiction ===
"Hampsley Cavern" in Agatha Christie's 1924 novel The Man in the Brown Suit is based on Kents Cavern. The 2011 science fiction romance Time Watchers: The Greatest of These, by Julie Reilly, uses Kents Cavern as a principal setting in three different time periods.

== See also ==
- Boxgrove Quarry an important Lower Palaeolithic British archaeological site in Sussex dating to approximately 500,000 years ago
- Gough's Cave
- Genetic history of the British Isles
- Happisburgh
- List of human evolution fossils
- List of prehistoric structures in Great Britain
- Pakefield
- Prehistoric Britain
- Paviland
- Pontnewydd
- Swanscombe
