= Kents Cavern 4 maxilla =

Hominin fossil

The Kents Cavern 4 maxilla is a human fossil consisting of a right canine, third premolar, and first molar as well as the bone holding them together including a small piece of palate. The fossil was found in 1927 at Kents Cavern, a limestone cave in Torquay, Devon, England.

The maxilla was uncovered at a depth of 10 feet 6 inches (3.20 m) and was located directly beneath a key ‘granular stalagmite’ at the site, which was used as a datum during excavations undertaken between 1926 and 1941 by the Torquay Natural History Society. The discovery of the KC4 maxilla was important because it became the earliest direct dated anatomically modern human (AMH) fossil yet discovered from a northwestern European site. Moreover the date obtained via a Bayesian statistical-modelling method provides evidence for the coexistence of anatomically modern humans and Neanderthals.

== Dating and re-dating ==
When the maxilla was excavated in 1927, it was analyzed by Sir Arthur Keith and determined to be of anatomically modern type. In 1989 researchers at Oxford University direct dated the maxilla via accelerator mass spectrometry (AMS), and obtained a date range of 30,900 ± 900 radiocarbon years (yr 14C) BP or approximately 35,000 old. This date confirmed Keith’s ascribed Upper Palaeolithic age for the fossil, while also reinforcing then-current views on the dating and modern human associations of the Aurignacian industry in north-western Europe. However research conducted in the late 2000s identified problems with the accuracy of many 14C dates from the Middle to Upper Paleolithic, especially dates that were obtained during the early stages of the technique. The initial dating of KC4 was further scrutinized when traces of modern glue, which was used to repair the bone shortly after being discovered, were found to have contaminated the surface of the fossil.

Due to this contamination additional testing of the fossil was determined to be necessary to confirm the date of the fossil. The bone did not contain enough uncontaminated surface area to re-date. This lack of adequate sample size was addressed when the research utilized the research archives from the Torquay Museum to obtain samples of other animal bones which had been excavate at Kent’s Cavern. These bones were obtained from strata with recorded depths both above and below the spot where the maxilla was found. The bone, which included cave bear and woolly rhinoceros obtained from close proximity to the maxilla, were then radiocarbon dated. All sampled bones where established as having dates from between 50,000 and 26,000 years old. By applying this information into a Bayesian statistical-modelling method, researchers were able to obtain an age for the maxilla that was between 44,000 and 41,000 years old.

== Anatomically Modern Human vs. Neanderthal ==
Since a date of 44,000 to 41,000 moves the maxilla, and the presence of anatomically modern humans, back to a period when Neanderthals were still populating Europe, scientists endeavored to further study the morphology and genetics of the teeth and maxilla to confirm it was not in fact of Neanderthal origin. An attempt was made to extract mitochondrial DNA from one of the teeth, but there were insufficient amounts for valid DNA sequencing. To more accurately measure the morphology of the teeth against both AMH and Neanderthal traits a virtual three-dimensional model of the maxilla was generated from a CT scan. Using this detailed model both the external and internal shapes of the teeth with samples of AMH and Neanderthal fossils from several different sites. The Kent’s Cavern maxilla was determined to possess early modern human characteristics in all but 3 of the 16 dental characteristics examined, leading the researchers to re-confirm it as an anatomically modern human fossil.

== Controversies ==
Some researchers refute the date obtained by the Bayesian method and argue that we cannot rely on the assumption that the deposits in which all the dated artefacts were located were undisturbed. They argue that the Bayesian AMS site chronology is problematic because it presents dating for material found above the maxilla returning an older date, implying that the material contexts had been disturbed. Furthermore it has been argued that the geology of the site undermines these dating methods, as establishing stratigraphic relationships for sediments deposited in caves is problematic.

== See also ==
- List of human evolution fossils
