= Édouard Lartet =

French paleontologist

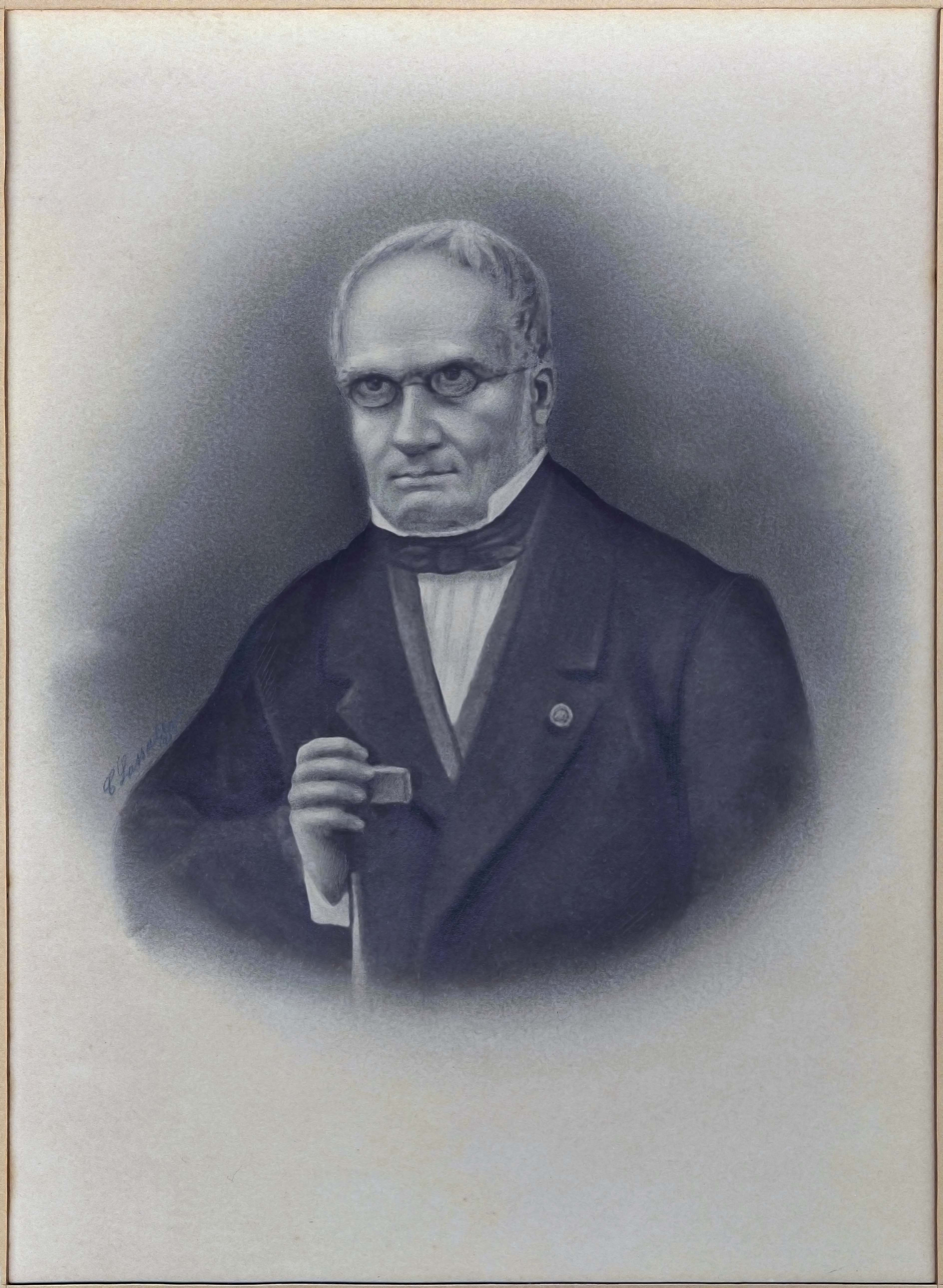
- Born: 15 April 1801; Castelnau-Barbarens, France
- Died: 28 January 1871; Séissan, France
- Occupation: Paleontologist

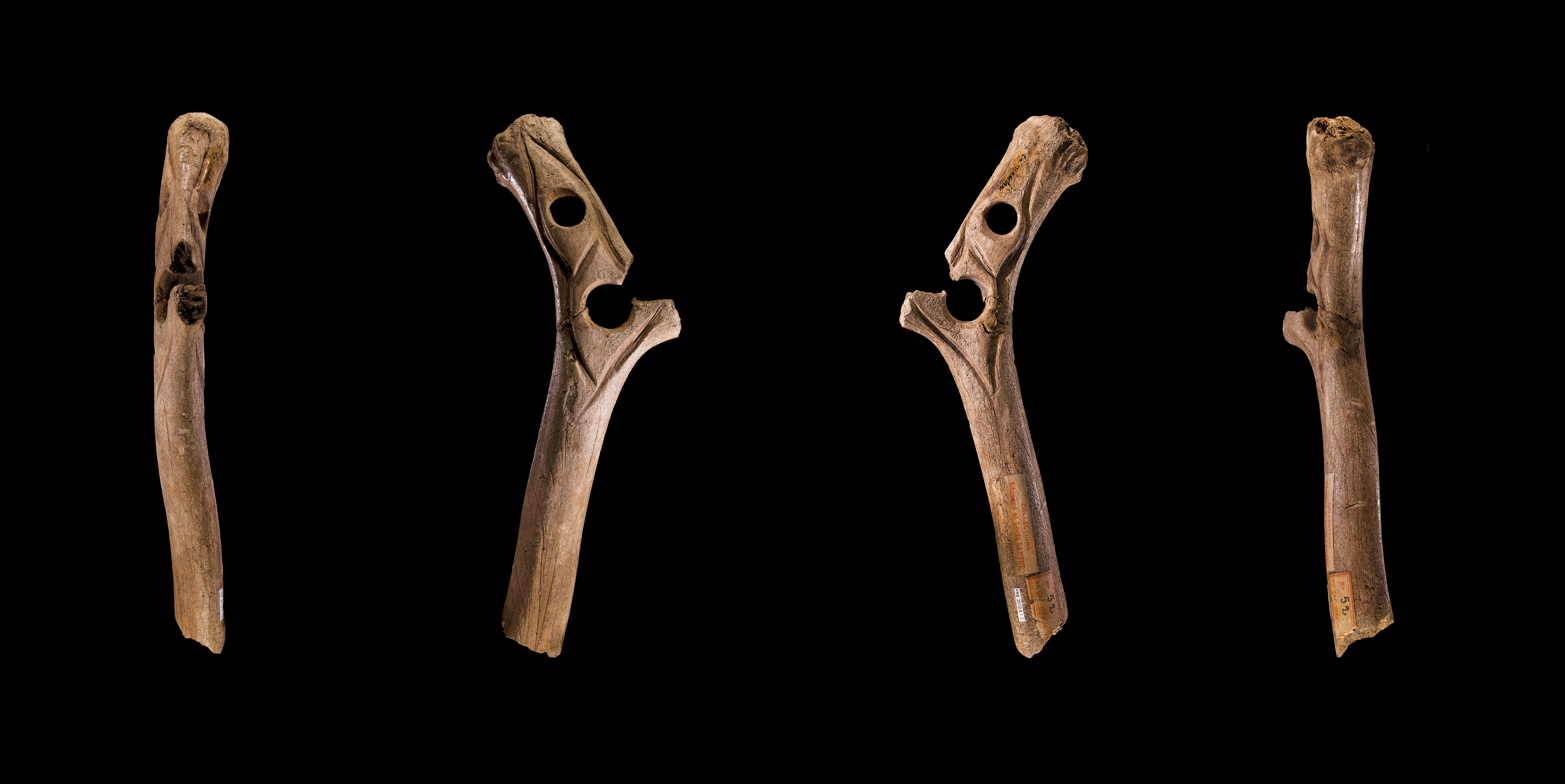
Pierced rod from Magdalenian, former collection of Lartet – Muséum de Toulouse.

Édouard Lartet (15 April 1801 – 28 January 1871) was a French geologist and paleontologist, and a pioneer of Paleolithic archaeology. He is also known for coining the prehistoric taxon Amphicyon, making it one of the earliest-described fossil carnivorans in the palaeontological record.

== Biography ==
Bust of Edouard Lartet by Louis Rochet (Museum of the Americas) of Auch

Lartet was born near Castelnau-Barbarens, département of Gers, France, where his family had lived for more than five hundred years. He was educated for the law at Auch and Toulouse, but having private means elected to devote himself to science. The then recent work of Georges Cuvier on fossil Mammalia encouraged Lartet in excavations which led in 1834 to his first discovery of fossil remains in the neighborhood of Auch. Additionally, he described a fossil carnivoran that had some anatomical relations to caniforms such as canids, provisionally naming the fossil taxon Amphicyon in 1836, although the name would be adopted as a permanent genus name in later studies by other palaeontologists. For the next decade and a half, he continued to explore the geography and palaeontology of the Pyrenees, uncovering ancestral apes close to the hominid line at Sansan.

In 1860, hearing of the discovery of human bones at a cave at Aurignac, and inspired by the work of William Pengelly, he turned his attention most fruitfully to the cave systems of the Dordogne. His first publication on the subject, The Antiquity of Man in Western Europe (1860), was followed in 1861 by New Researches on the Coexistence of Man and of the Great Fossil Mammifers characteristic of the Last Geological Period. Here he revealed the results of his discoveries in the Aurignac cave, demonstrating the contemporaneous existence of man and extinct mammals. While these first results were met with some incredulity, a fellow geologist helpfully pointed Lartet towards the Vézère valley in the Périgord district, where in 1863 he began to dig backed by the financial and personal help of Henry Christy.

Their conjoint work was immediately to open new horizons, and served to establish a basic stratified typology of Paleolithic man which still holds good today. The important discoveries in the Abri de la Madeleine and Le Moustier provided type-sites for archaic stone-age cultures, which (from the associated fauna) Lartet linked to an early 'mammoth' phase and a late 'reindeer' phase. Lartet and Christy were also able to establish and document the presence of mobiliary art in early stratified layers, further transforming the common and professional perception of early man. Such 'home' art, involving bone patternings and carvings, were associated with both the Aurignacian and the Magdalenean cultures.

The account of their joint researches appeared in a paper descriptive of the Dordogne caves and contents published in Revue archéologique (1864); and would eventually be published by Lartet and Christy under the title Reliquiae Aquitanicae, the first part appearing in 1865. Christy unfortunately died before the completion of the work, but Lartet continued it until the breakdown of his health in 1870. Many artefacts from their excavations are now kept in the local museum in Toulouse, as well as the British Museum in London. His son Louis Lartet followed in his father's footsteps.

The most modest and one of the most illustrious of the founders of modern palaeontology, Lartet's work was publicly recognized by his nomination as an officer of the Légion d'honneur; and in 1848 he had had the offer of a political post. In 1857 he had been elected a foreign member of the Geological Society of London, and a few weeks before his death he had been made professor of palaeontology at the museum of the Jardin des Plantes. He died at Séissan. He was elected as a member of the American Philosophical Society in 1869.

== See also ==
- Antiquity of man
- Boucher de Perthes
- Cave art
- de Mortillet
- Mousterian
