= Welby baronets =

Baronetcy in the Baronetage of the United Kingdom

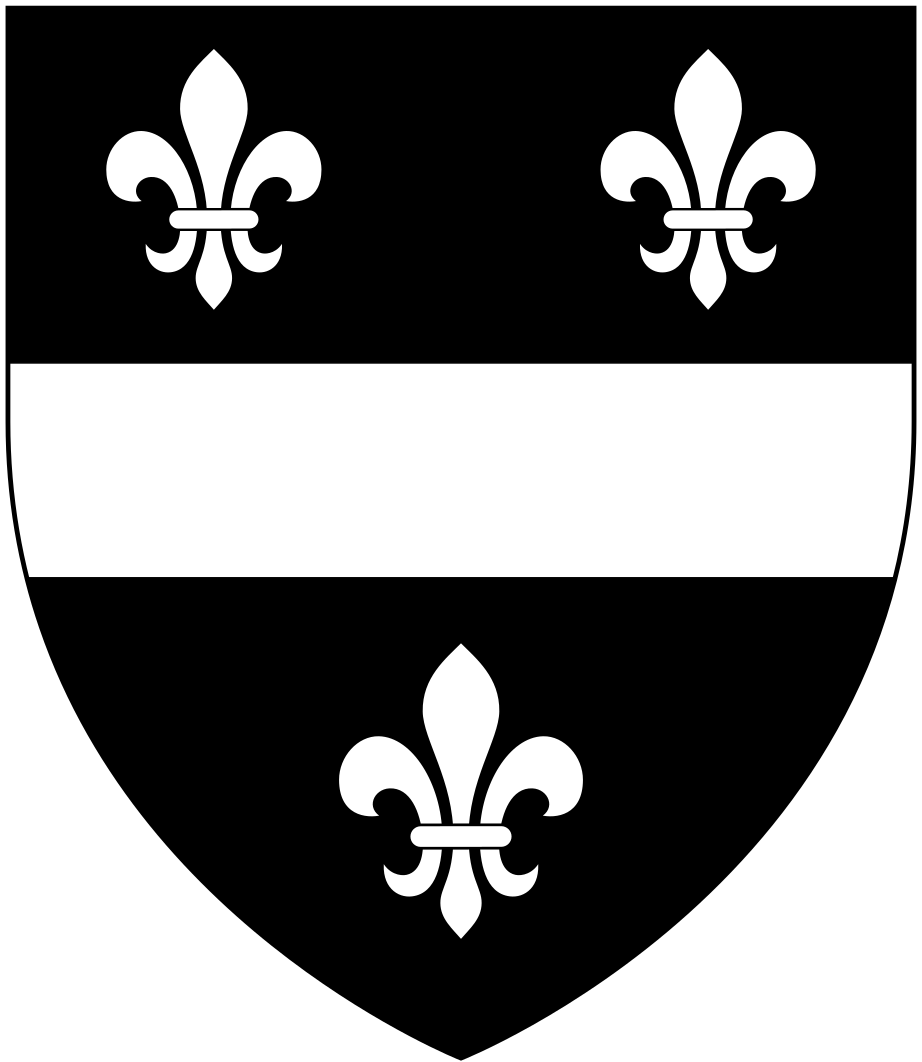
Arms of Welby: Sable, a fess between three fleurs-de-Lys argent

The Welby baronetcy, of Denton Manor in the County of Lincoln, is a title in the Baronetage of the United Kingdom.

It was created on 27 June 1801 for William Welby, Member of Parliament for Grantham from 1802 to 1806.

The second and third Baronets also represented this constituency in the House of Commons. The fourth Baronet sat as Conservative Member of Parliament for Grantham and Lincolnshire South. He assumed by royal licence the additional surname of Gregory in 1876. However, none of his successors have held this surname. The fifth Baronet represented Newark in Parliament as a Conservative.

== Welby baronets, of Denton Manor (1801) ==
- Sir William Earle Welby, 1st Baronet (c. 1734–1815)
- Sir William Earle Welby, 2nd Baronet (1768–1852)
- Sir Glynne Earle Welby, 3rd Baronet (1806–1875)
- Sir William Earle Welby-Gregory, 4th Baronet (1829–1898)
- Sir Charles Glynne Earle Welby, 5th Baronet (1865–1938)
- Sir Oliver Charles Earle Welby, 6th Baronet (1902–1977)
- Sir Richard Bruno Gregory Welby, 7th Baronet (b. 1928)

The heir apparent to the title is the present holder's eldest son, Charles William Hodder Welby (b. 1953).

== Extended family ==
Several other members of the family have also gained distinction. The Right Reverend Thomas Earle Welby (1810–1899), second son of the second Baronet, was Bishop of St Helena for many years. Sir Alfred Welby (1849–1937), seventh son of the third baronet, was a Lieutenant-Colonel in the Army and Conservative Member of Parliament for Taunton. Sir Christopher Welby-Everard (1909–1996), son of Edward Welby-Everard (who had assumed by royal licence the additional surname of Everard in 1894), son of Edward Montague Earle Welby, fourth son of the third baronet, was a major general in the army and the last British officer to command the Nigerian Army. Victoria, Lady Welby, wife of the fourth baronet, was a philosopher.

== Notes ==
Baronetage of the United Kingdom
Preceded by Bensley baronets	Welby baronets of Denton Manor; 27 June 1801	Succeeded by Baynes baronets
