= Sir William Earle Welby, 2nd Baronet =

British land-owner, baronet and Member of Parliament

Lieutenant Sir William Earle Welby, 2nd Baronet (14 November 1768 – 3 November 1852) was a British land-owner, baronet and Member of Parliament for Grantham from 1807 to 1820. He also served as High Sheriff of Lincolnshire from 1823 to 1824.

== Early life ==
William Earle Welby was born on 14 November 1768 at Denton in Lincolnshire. He was the eldest son of Sir William Earle Welby, 1st Baronet, of Denton and the only son by his first wife, Penelope Glynne, a daughter of Sir John Glynne, 6th Baronet, and his wife Honora Conway.

The younger Welby was admitted at Emmanuel College, Cambridge, in 1786 and matriculated the following year, though he took no degree. He worked at the Newark banking firm of Welby & Co. until his father's death, and was a Lieutenant in the Ossington Volunteers from 1806.

== Family ==
Welby married on 30 August 1792, Wilhelmina Spry, daughter and heir of William Spry, who was Governor of Barbados from 1767 to 1772, and his wife Katherine Cholmeley. She died on 4 February 1847. Together, they had seven daughters and three sons:

- Elizabeth Welby (1804–1888). She married, on 17 February 1829, Thomas James Ireland of Ousden Hall, Suffolk, (he died in 1863) and had with him five children.
- Sir Glynne Earle Welby, 3rd Baronet (later Welby-Gregory, by Royal Licence; 1806–1875). He succeeded his father as Baronet and also served as a member of parliament.
- Rt Rev. Thomas Earle Welby, DD (1810–1899). He was an Anglican clergyman, who was consecrated as the second Bishop of St Helena in 1862, in which position he served until his death.
- Arthur Earle Welby (1815–1884). Rector of Holy Trinity, Hulme, Manchester. He married, on 13 May 1843, Julia, daughter of Capt. George Macdonald of the 68th Regiment; she died on 18 October 1892. Together they had seven children.
- Wilhelmina Welby (died 1874). She married, on 17 May 1825, the Rev. Frederick Browning, Prebendary of Salisbury; he died on 3 December 1858.
- Penelope Welby (died 1834). She married, on 8 May 1825, Clinton James Fynes Clinton (1792–1833), MP for Aldborough, and together they had two children.
- Katherine Welby (died 1869). She married, on 13 May 1822, the Rev. Thomas Welby Northmore, her first cousin and the son of Thomas Northmore of Cleve, FRS, a writer, and Penelope Welby, a daughter of the first baronet; the Rev. Northmore died on 16 July 1829; he and his wife had two children.
- Jane Welby (died 1832), who died unmarried.
- Caroline Welby.
- Augusta Welby (died 1852).

== Member of Parliament and public service ==
In the late eighteenth and early nineteenth centuries, Sir William Manners, Bt., was attempting to take control of the borough of Grantham, which had previously been controlled by two land-owning aristocrats, the Duke of Rutland and Lord Brownlow; Manners's grandfather, Lord William Manners, had purchased the manor, his son accumulated much wealth, and Sir William purchased houses in Grantham and worked to be returned as a member of parliament for the Borough. Welby's father, who was Lord of the Manor of nearby Denton, stood to oppose Manners in 1802, being supported by Rutland and Brownlow, and was elected, serving until 1806. After he declined to stand again, a compromise was formed between Manners and the land-owners, but it did not last and, by the time the 1807 elections began, Manners was hoping to control the Borough's seats in Parliament.

Welby stood to oppose Manners, as his father had done before him, and, like his father, was elected (finishing second, with 411 votes). As a Member, he was an infrequent voter and is not known to have made any speeches; he also applied for leaves of absence in 1808 and 1812. When he did vote, it was generally with the Government, voting, for instance, in 1810 on the side of the Government over an inquiry into the British Walcheren Campaign against the Dutch in 1809. In the borough, Welby remained opposed to the imposition of Manners and, shocked at Rutland's decision to sell him land in return for hunting rights, he barred Rutland from hunting on the Welby estates.

At the 1812 election, Welby was able to gain the support of enough of the borough's freemen and land-owners in the corporation, and secured a compromise with Manners, allowing for him to be re-elected. Again, he voted infrequently, most notably with the Government against Catholic relief in 1813. In 1815, his father died and he inherited the Baronetcy and his estates, after which time he attended the House less regularly. He was re-elected in 1818, but declined to stand in 1820 and never returned to the House. In the years following, he remained somewhat active in local politics and became Sheriff of Lincolnshire for a year beginning in 1823.

== Later life ==
After 1823, Welby left public office and returned to his estates. He died on 3 November 1852.

Parliament of Great Britain
Preceded by Thomas Thoroton; Russell Manners	Member of Parliament for Grantham; 1807–1820; With: Thomas Thoroton (1807–1812); Robert Percy Smith (1812–1818); Hon. Edward Cust (1818–1820)	Succeeded by Hon. Edward Cust; James Hughes
Other offices
Preceded by Sir John Thorold, 10th Baronet	High Sheriff of Lincolnshire; 1823–1824	Succeeded by William Edward Tomline
Baronetage of the United Kingdom
Preceded by William Earle Welby	Baronet (of Denton Mannor); 1815–1852	Succeeded by Glynne Earle Welby-Gregory
