= Thomas Northmore =

English writer, inventor and geologist

Arms of Northmore: Gules, a lion rampant or armed and langued azure crowned with an eastern crown argent

Thomas Northmore FSA (1766–1851) was an English writer, inventor and geologist.

== Origins ==
He was born at Cleve in the parish of St Thomas, Exeter, in Devon, the eldest son of Thomas Northmore of Cleve, by his wife Elizabeth Osgood, daughter and heiress of Richard Osgood of Fulham.

== Career ==
He was educated at Blundell's School in Tiverton, Devon, and at Emmanuel College, Cambridge, where he graduated B.A. in 1789, and M.A. in 1792. On 19 May 1791 he was elected a Fellow of the Society of Antiquaries. He retired to cultivate his paternal estate, where he lived for the rest of his life, spending time on mechanics, literature, and politics. He contested Exeter in June 1818 as a Radical, when he only polled 293 votes. He also unsuccessfully contested Barnstaple. He discovered about 1824 the bones in Kents Cavern at Torquay. He found beneath the bed of mud which lies under the stalagmitic flooring of the cavern the tusk of a hyæna, and then a metatarsal bone of the cavern bear. These finds proved important to later work on the antiquity of the human race. A much more thorough dig was undertaken by William Pengelly and the British Association.

== Marriages and children ==
He married twice:

- Firstly to Penelope Welby, eldest daughter of Sir William Earle Welby, 1st Baronet (c. 1734–1815), of Denton Hall, Lincolnshire, by whom he had one son:
  - Thomas Welby Northmore, who predeceased his father, having married his cousin Katherine Welby (d. 1869), third daughter of Sir William Earle Welby, 2nd Baronet (1768–1852), by whom he had two sons:
    - Thomas Welby Northmore, who succeeded his grandfather in the paternal estates;
    - John Northmore, a civil servant in Ceylon.
- Secondly he married Emmeline Eden, fifth daughter of Sir John Eden, 4th Baronet (1740–1812), of Windlestone Park and Beamish Park, Durham, by whom he had one son and nine daughters.

== Death ==
He died at Furzebrook House, near Axminster, on 20 May 1851.

== Works ==
His works include:

- Tryphiodōrou Iliou Alōsis. De plurimis mendis purgata, et notis illustrata a T. Northmore (Greek), London, 1791; reissued with a Latin version in 1804.
- Plutarch's Treatise upon the Distinction between a Friend and Flatterer, with Remarks, London, 1793.
- Memoirs of Planetes, or a Sketch of the Laws and Manners of Makar. By Phileleutherus Devoniensis, London, 1795. In this work a utopian form of government is described.
- A Triplet of Inventions, consisting of a Description of a Nocturnal or Diurnal Telegraph, a Proposal for an Universal Character, and a Scheme for facilitating the Progress of Science; exemplified in the Osteological part of Anatomy, Exeter, 1796.
- A Quadruplet of Invention, Exeter, 1796; an augmented edition of the ‘Triplet.’
- An edition of Thomas Gray's Tour through England and Wales [1799].
- Of Education founded upon Principles. Part the First. Time: previous to the Age of puberty, London, 1800.
- Washington; or Liberty restored: a Poem in ten Books, London, 1809; Baltimore, 1809; notice in ‘Quarterly Review,’ ii. 365–75.

In Nicholson's Journal he wrote on Effects on Gases by change in their Habitudes, or elective Attractions, when mechanically compressed, 1805 (vol. xii. p. 368), and on Experiments on condensed Gases, 1806 (vol. xiii. p. 233).
