= John MacEnery =

British archaeologist

Reverend John MacEnery F.G.S
- Born: 27 November 1797; Limerick, Ireland
- Died: 18 February 1841 (aged 43); Torre Abbey, Torquay
- Resting place: Torre Churchyard, Torquay

John MacEnery (27 November 1796 – 18 February 1841) was a Roman Catholic priest from Limerick, Ireland and early archaeologist who came to Devon as Chaplain to the Cary family at Torre Abbey in 1822. In 1825, 1826 and 1829, he investigated the prehistoric remains at Kent's Cavern in Devon, having been shown the cave by Thomas Northmore.

MacEnery concluded that the palaeolithic flint tools he found in the same contexts as the bones of extinct prehistoric mammals meant that early humans and the creatures such as mammoths co-existed.

His contemporaries had great difficulty reconciling his findings to their pre-Darwinian view of the earth's history. 20th century commentators suggest it was the influence of the theologian William Buckland who persuaded MacEnery to doubt the evidence he saw before him, which led to MacEnery never publishing his work. However, Edward Vivian stated that it was simply the expense which caused him to abandon publication. MacEnery left Torquay and his cave research in 1830 and it was left to Vivian, whose heavily edited version of his work was published in 1859, and then later to William Pengelly who publicised and explored the original manuscript of his findings in 1869, many years after MacEnery's death at age 43.

John MacEnery studied for the priesthood in St Munchin's College, the Limerick Diocesan College then in Palmerstown County Limerick, where he was ordained in 1819.

MacEnery retired early due to ill health following an accident and lived for a time in Rome and Paris before returning to Torre Abbey in 1838. He died on 18 February 1841, and is buried in Torre Churchyard, Torquay.

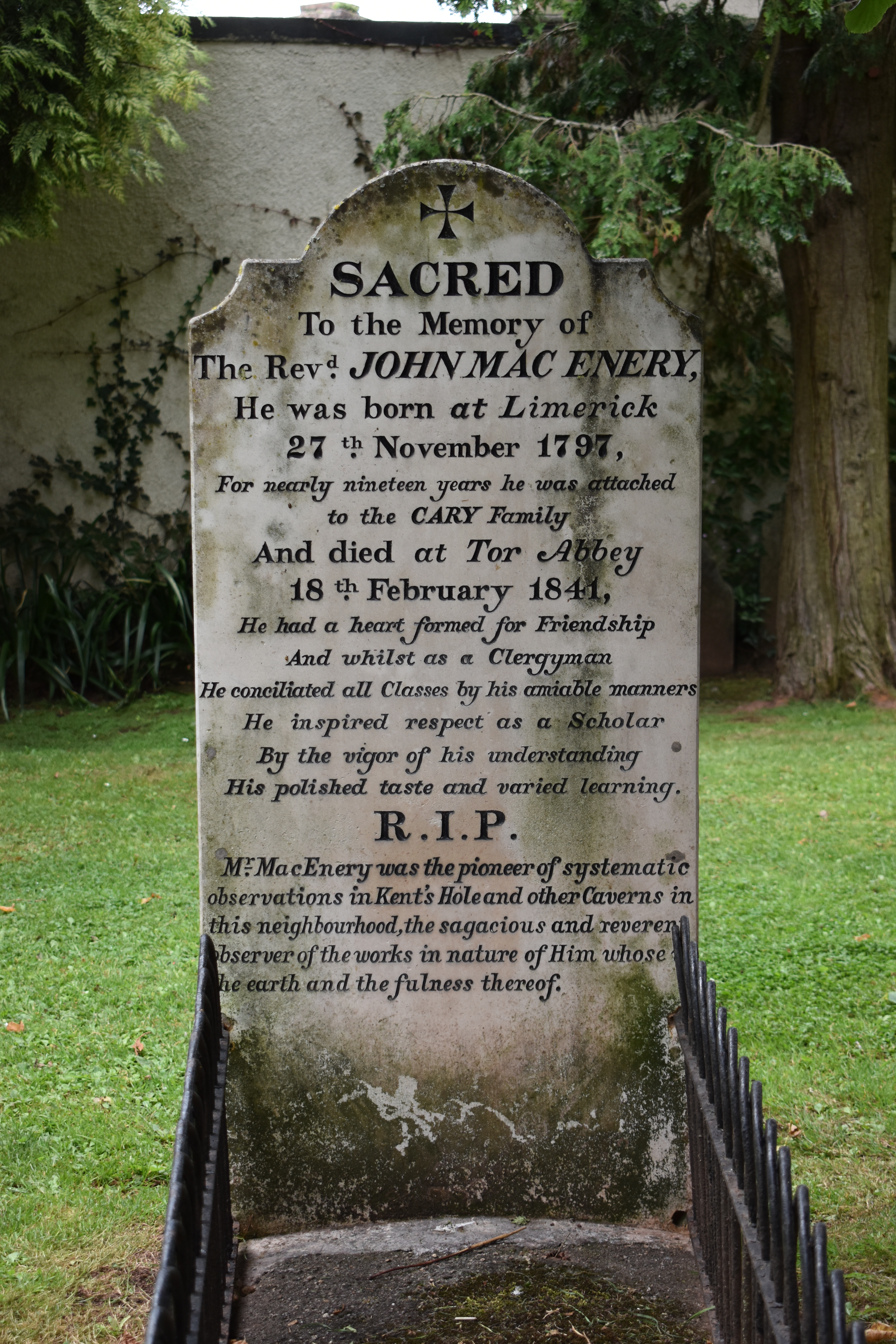
Gravestone in St. Andrew's churchyard in Torquay.
