= Sir William Earle Welby, 1st Baronet =

British land-owner, baronet and Member of Parliament

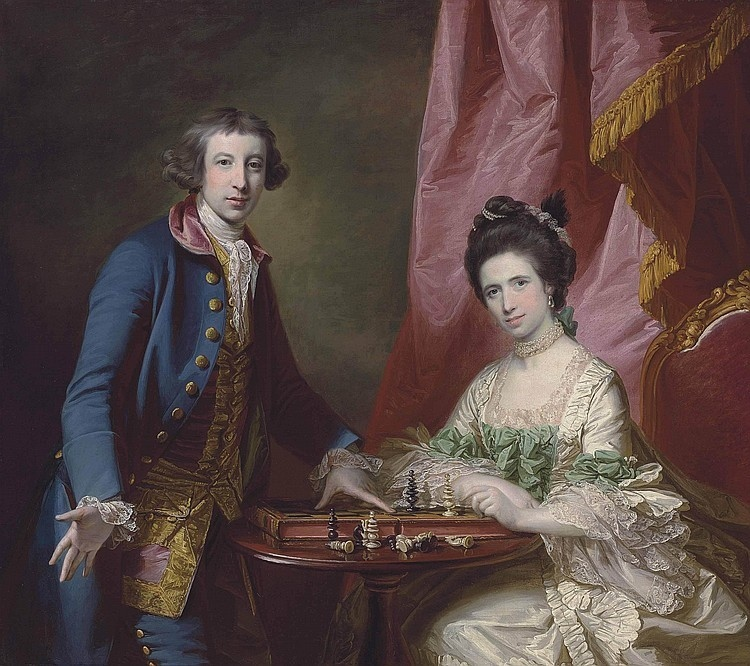
Portrait of William Earle Welby, of Denton, Lincolnshire, and his first wife, Penelope, playing chess, before a draped curtain

Sir William Earle Welby, 1st Baronet (c. 1734 – 6 November 1815), was a British land-owner, baronet and Member of Parliament for Grantham from 1802 to 1806. He also served as High Sheriff of Lincolnshire from 1796 to 1797.

== Early life ==
William Earle Welby was baptised on 22 August 1734 at Denton in Lincolnshire. He was the only son of Col. William Welby of Denton and his wife Catherine, a daughter of James Cholmeley of Easton and his wife Catherine Woodfine. The elder Welby had been a Colonel in the Lincolnshire Militia and was Sheriff of Lincolnshire in 1746.

The younger Welby was educated first at Eton School, before being admitted to Clare College, Cambridge, in 1753 and then at the Middle Temple in 1756.

== Family ==
Welby married twice. His first marriage was to Penelope Glynne, the daughter of Sir John Glynne, 6th Baronet, and his wife Honora Conway, daughter and co-heiress of Henry Conway and his wife Honora, née Ravenscroft. With her he had one son and one daughter who survived to adulthood, and, according to Collin's Baronetage of England, two other children who died as infants. Their surviving issue were:

- Lieutenant Sir William Earle Welby, 2nd Baronet (1768–1852), who succeeded his father as baronet.
- Penelope Welby (died 1792). She married, as his first wife, Thomas Northmore of Cleve, co. Devon. He was born in 1766 and died in 1851. She died on 7 November 1792. Together, they had one child, the Rev. Capt. Thomas Welby Northmore (1791–1829), who married Katherine Welby, daughter of Sir William Earle Welby, 2nd Baronet.

He then married, secondly, Elizabeth Cope, daughter and heiress of Robert Cope of Spondon; together, they had the following daughters, who died unmarried, Catherine Welby (1776–1849), Elizabeth Welby (1782–1862), Eleanora Charlotte Welby (1783–1855), Maria Rebecca Welby (born 1788) and Selina Charlotte Welby (d. young, before 1806), and the following other children:

- Thomas Earle Welby (died 1838). Admitted at Emmanuel College, Cambridge, in 1793, he was subsequently admitted at the Middle Temple in 1795. He died unmarried.
- Charles Cope Earle Welby (1777–1846). He was educated at Emmanuel College, Cambridge, where he was admitted in 1793. He was subsequently admitted at the Middle Temple in 1795. He died unmarried.
- The Reverend Montague Earle Welby (c. 1778–1871). Educated at Emmanuel College, Cambridge (matriculated 1797; B.A. 1801). Ordained as a Deacon in 1802 and a priest in 1803; he was rector of Long Bennington, Lincolnshire (1808–1849), and Newton Harcourt, Leicestershire (1802–1847). He died unmarried.
- Captain Richard Earle Welby (1779–1834). He was educated at Emmanuel College, Cambridge, being admitted in 1797. Cornet, Life Guards; Lt. 1802; Capt. 1806. Married in 1812 Catherine, née Judd, the widow of Henry Penton (1736–1812), MP for Winchester.
- The Reverend John Earle Welby. He was admitted at Emmanuel College, Cambridge, in 1806 (matriculating in 1806); he received a B.A. 1811 and proceeded M.A. in 1814. He was then admitted at Lincoln's Inn in 1805. Vicar of Keddington, 1812–16; Rector of Haceby and Sapperton, 1813–16; of West Allington, 1814–67; of Stroxton, 1816–67; of Harston, 1816–67. He married, in 1819, Felicia Eliza Hole, daughter of the Rev. Humphrey Aram Hole and his wife Sarah Horne, daughter of Dr. George Horne, Bishop of Norwich. With his wife, he had seven children, including Reginald Earle (Welby), 1st Baron Welby, sometime a Permanent Secretary to the Treasury.

== Member of Parliament and public service ==
The Welby family were part of the minor landed gentry in Lincolnshire during the middle of the eighteenth century. Welby himself was Lord of the Manor of Denton, near Grantham. By the late 1760s, Welby had become established in high society circles, marrying the daughter of Sir John Glynne, from an old land-owning family, the Glynne baronets. The year after his marriage, he and his wife were painted by the fashionable portrait artist Francis Cotes; the painting was described as one of Cotes's masterpieces when it was sold in 2012 by the auction house Christies for £457,000. The next twenty years of his life were not spent in public office, though, as a Lord of the Manor, he would have been concerned with the management of his estates. After his first wife's death in 1777, Welby remarried to an heiress, supplementing his wealth; indeed, he was able to send all of his sons from that marriage to Cambridge University.

His first entry into official office came in 1796–7, when he served as High Sheriff of Lincolnshire (being succeeded by John Cracroft), but it would be another six years before his entry into Parliament. During that time, he was created a Baronet, in 1801. His entry into the House came in 1802, when the Duke of Rutland and Lord Brownlow, who were the principal land-owners around Grantham, were resisting attempts by Sir William Manners, Bt., to purchase the borough and establish himself as its Member of Parliament. Although Welby claimed to stand independent of any patronage, he essentially represented the gentlemen of the borough opposed to Manners and was thus supported by Rutland and Brownlow. Despite Manners's efforts, Welby finished second with 434 votes.

As a member of parliament, Welby was largely quiet and is not known to have made any speeches in the House. He silently supported Addington and then Pitt, although he appears an infrequent voter and his loyalty to the Government could not easily be counted on. He voted against the Censure of Lord Melville in 1805. In 1806, after serving a four-year term, Welby declined to stand again.

== Later life ==
He remained out of public office until his death in 1815, aged about 82. He was succeeded in his titles by his eldest son.

== Likenesses ==
- Portrait of William Earle Welby (c. 1734-1815), of Denton, Lincolnshire and his first wife, Penelope (1737-1771), playing chess, before a draped curtain by Francis Cotes. This portrait sold at Christie's for £457,250 in July 2012 and is now on display in the Louvre Abu Dhabi.

Parliament of Great Britain
Preceded by Simon Yorke; George Sutton	Member of Parliament for Grantham; 1802–1806; With: Thomas Thoroton	Succeeded by Thomas Thoroton; Russell Manners
Other offices
Preceded by Ayscoghe Boucherett	High Sheriff of Lincolnshire; 1796–1797	Succeeded by John Cracroft
Baronetage of the United Kingdom
New creation	Baronet (of Denton Manor); 1801–1815	Succeeded by William Earl Welby
