= Thomas Welby =

English missionary, clergyman and soldier

The Right Reverend Thomas Earle Welby
- Church: Anglican
- Province: Southern Africa
- Diocese: St Helena

Orders
- Consecration: 29 May 1862

Personal details
- Born: 11 July 1810
- Died: 6 January 1899 (aged 88) Jamestown, Saint Helena

Thomas Earle Welby (11 July 1810 – 6 January 1899) was an English missionary, clergyman and former soldier. The younger son of a baronet, he served in the army for eight years, but, after leaving 1837, served as a missionary in Canada, where he became a rector, and later as an archdeacon in South Africa, before going on to be consecrated as the second bishop of the island Saint Helena in the Anglican church.

== Early life and education ==
Thomas Earle Welby was born on 11 July 1810, the second son of Sir William Earle Welby, the second Baronet, and Wilhelmina Spry, daughter of William Spry, a Governor of Barbados. He was educated as a boy at Rugby School.

At the age of 16, Welby joined the army as an ensign in the 26th Foot, becoming a lieutenant in 1829 and then a lieutenant in the 13th Light Dragoons in 1830, at which rank he remained until leaving in 1837. After marrying (see below), he was admitted to Christ's College, Cambridge in 1846; he also received two Lambeth Degrees: an M.A., on 22 May 1848, and a Doctor of Divinity on 27 February 1862. (Note: Venn gives the year of the MA as 1843, as does Crockford's Clerical Directory, 1898, p. 1186.)

== Family ==
Welby married, in 1837, Mary Browne, daughter of A. Browne; she died in 1897. Together, they had ten children:

- Henry Earle Welby (1838–1869). He married, in 1866, Cecilia Bland, a daughter of T. Bland of George Town, Cape Colony (South Africa). Together they had one son: Hugh Earle Welby (b. 1867).
- Captain Charles Earle Welby (1850 - 1913) He was an Inspector of Schools for Allahabad in the Indian Educational Service; served in the Agra Volunteer Rifles, becoming a Captain; later an Honorary Fellow of Allahabad University. He married, in 1880, Annie Williams, widow of Walter Conroy and they had one son, Thomas Earle Welby (b. 1881), a sub-editor of the Madras Mail.
- Arthur Thomas Earle Welby (1855–1908). He was the General Manager of the Rio Denver Railroad, United States. He married firstly in 1874, Phoebe de Cew (d. 1895), daughter of Capt. de Cew, and secondly, in 1898, Maria Mitchell, daughter of J. F. Mitchell, and had five children with her.
- Frederick Earle Welby, FRCSE (1858–1900). He married, in 1883, Janet Anne Henderson, daughter of F. Henderson of Wick, and had, with her, four children.
- Penelope Welby. (b 1842) She married, in 1863, Major-General John Haughton, who died in 1889, and had with him two children.
- Wilhelmina Welby. She married, in 1864, Major-General Robert Barton, of the Royal Engineers, who died without issue in 1894.She died in 1912 .
- Elizabeth Welby. (d.1934)
- Carline Welby. She married, firstly, in 1867, Charles Henry Fowler,, who died in 1877, and, secondly, in 1884, the Rev. Francis William Carré, Vicar of St. Katherine's, Marlborough, who died in 1901; with her husbands, she had three children.
- Katherine Welby. Married on St Helena in 1873 to Saul Solomon of St Helena. He died in 1896. They had four children. She died 23 March 1937
- Edith Frances Welby. She married, in 1884, Lieutenant-Colonel Robert Mark Bradford, a surgeon.

== Ecclesiastical career ==
Welby, having left the army and ceased his studies at Cambridge without taking his degree, went to work as a missionary in Canada, where he was ordained in the diocese of Toronto, becoming (in 1842) the rector of Sandwich in Western Canada; he remained there for five years, before returning to England, where he served as the rector of Newton-near-Folkingham, Lincolnshire, which was under his father's patronage. He resigned this benefice and, after completing missionary work, he became an archdeacon in the Diocese of George, South Africa, in 1856. When Piers Claughton, the first bishop of St. Helena, was translated to Colombo, Welby was consecrated as the second bishop of St Helena at Lambeth Palace on 29 May 1862; it was at this time that he was conferred with his second Lambeth degree, a Doctor of Divinity, by Charles Longley, archbishop of Canterbury. His obituary in the Morning Post states that he declined several subsequent offers of translation to "more important" posts, being a "firm believer" in the principle that colonial bishops should not return to England. He served as bishop until his death in 1899.

== Death ==
He was killed in a carriage accident at Jamestown on 6 January 1899.

== Notes and references ==
- Massue, Melville Henry (1911). The Plantagenet Roll of the Blood Royal: being a Complete Roll of all the Descendants now Living of Edward III by le Marquis de Ruvigny et Raineval. Vol. Part 1. Mortimer-Percy.
- Venn, J.A (1954). Alummni Cantabrigenses. Vol. 6 Pt 2.
- Crockford's Clerical Directory, 1898
