= Henry Williamson Haynes =

American archaeologist

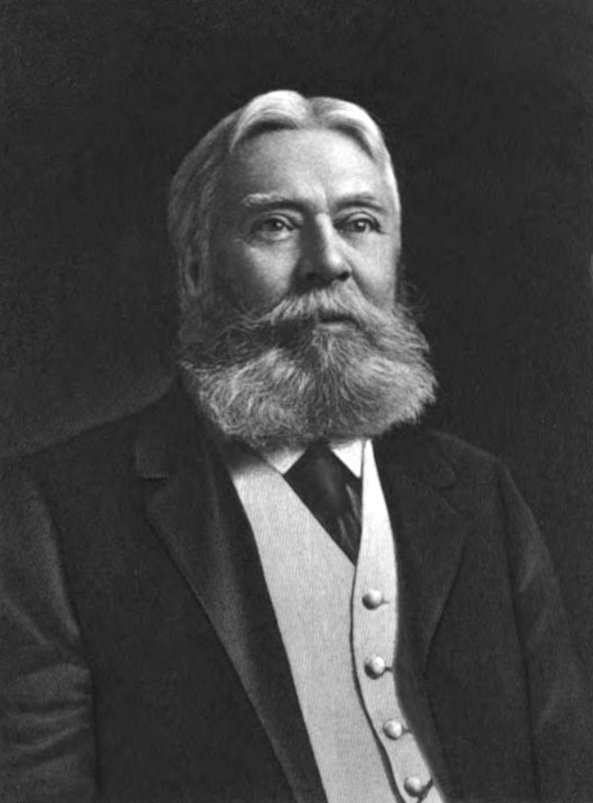
- Born: September 20, 1831; Bangor, Maine, U.S.
- Died: February 16, 1912 (aged 80); Boston, Massachusetts, U.S.
- Education: Harvard University
- Occupation: Archaeologist
- Spouse: Helen Weld (m. 1867; died 1902)

Henry Williamson Haynes (1831–1912) was an American archaeologist.

== Biography ==
Henry Williamson Haynes was born in Bangor, Maine on September 20, 1831, the son of a prominent newspaper editor. He graduated from Harvard in 1851, and, after a stint at teaching, studied law and practised it for several years. He was subsequently called to fill the chair of Latin in the University of Vermont, and later he became professor of Greek in the same institution, but resigned in 1873 to devote his time to his real love, archaeology.

Haynes sailed for Europe, where he spent six years in systematic study among the antiquities of various countries, also taking part in several international congresses. The winter of 1877-78 he spent in Egypt seeking evidence of the Paleolithic age in that country. The results of his investigations were presented at the International Congress of Anthropological Sciences, held in Paris in 1878, where he was rewarded with a medal and a diploma, and his paper was afterward published in the Memoirs of the American Academy of Arts and Sciences.

Returning to the United States Haynes settled in Boston, where he became a member of the schoolboard and a trustee of the Boston Public Library. He continued to devote most of his time to archaeology, however, collecting primarily in the American Southwest and Mexico, and contributing to scientific and literary journals. He became Vice President of the Boston Society of Natural History, and served on the executive committee of the Archaeological Institute of America. He was elected a member of the American Antiquarian Society in 1881.

He married Helen Weld on August 1, 1867. She died on July 21, 1902.

Haynes died at his home in Boston on February 16, 1912.

Haynes' collections are now owned by the Peabody Museum and Classical Dept. of Harvard University, the Boston Museum of Fine Arts and the Boston Society of Natural History.
