= Castelnau-Barbarens =

- Commune
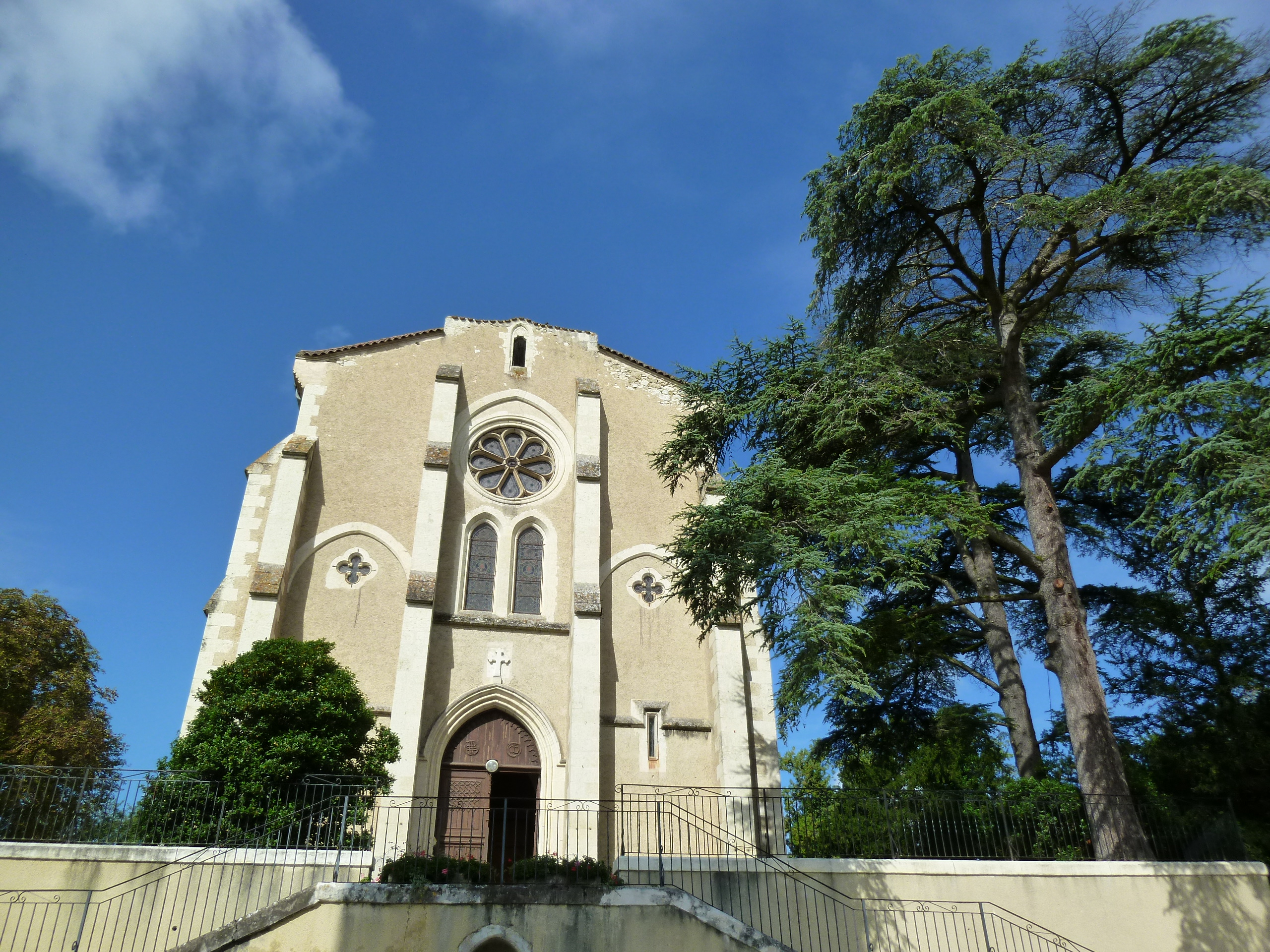
- The church in Castelnau-Barbarens

- Coat of arms
- Location of Castelnau-Barbarens
- Location within France Location within Occitanie
- Coordinates: 43°34′38″N 0°43′29″E
- Country: France
- Region: Occitania
- Department: Gers
- Arrondissement: Auch
- Canton: Astarac-Gimone
- Intercommunality: CA Grand Auch Cœur Gascogne

Government
  - Mayor (2020–2026): Michel Burgan
- Area^{1}: 42.37 km^{2} (16.36 sq mi)
- Elevation: 295 m (968 ft)
- Highest elevation: 291 m (955 ft)
- Lowest elevation: 157 m (515 ft)
- Population (2023): 596
  - Density: 14.1/km^{2} (36.4/sq mi)
- Time zone: UTC+01:00 (CET)
  - Summer (DST): UTC+02:00 (CEST)
- INSEE/Postal code: 32076 /32450
- ^{1} French Land Register data, which excludes lakes, ponds, glaciers > 1 km^{2} (0.386 sq mi or 247 acres) and river estuaries.

Castelnau-Barbarens (Gascon: Castèthnau Barbarens) is a commune in the Gers department in southwestern France.

== Geography ==
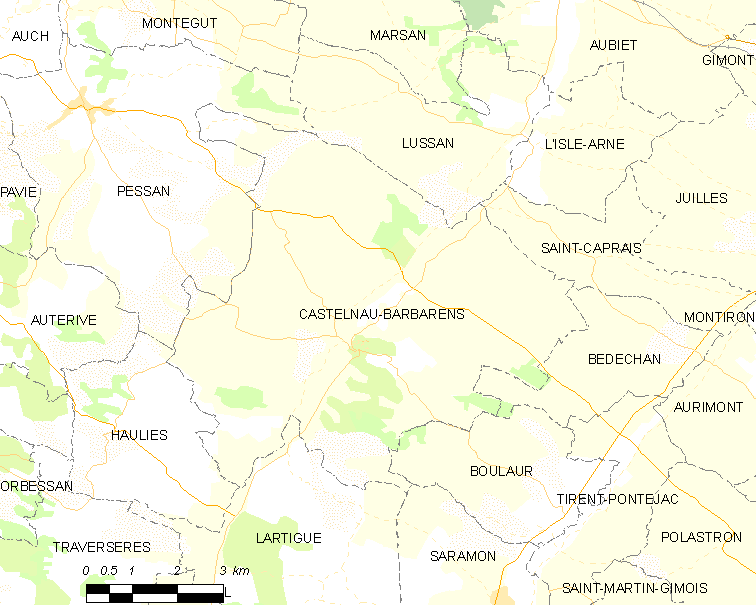
Castelnau-Barbarens and its surrounding communes

== Population ==
Historical population
Year	Pop.	±% p.a.
1968	525	—
1975	421	−3.10%
1982	432	+0.37%
1990	414	−0.53%
1999	452	+0.98%
2007	489	+0.99%
2012	515	+1.04%
2017	528	+0.50%
2023	596	+2.04%
Source: INSEE

== See also ==
- Communes of the Gers department
