= Torquay Museum =

Museum in Devon, England

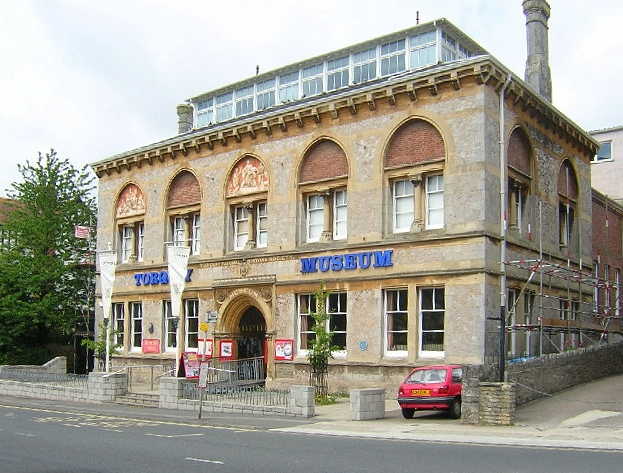

- Shown within Devon
- Location: Torquay, Devon, England
- Coordinates: 50.46250°N 3.518459°W
- Website: torquaymuseum.org

Torquay Museum is a museum located on Babbacombe Road, in the town of Torquay, Devon, England. The building has been a grade II listed building since 1975. The museum is dedicated to the natural, social and cultural heritage of Torquay and the South Devon area.

== Collections ==
The museum is divided across 4 floors, with galleries on a number of subjects including paleontology, natural history, and ceramics. There is a gallery devoted to the local author Agatha Christie and another to local explorers and egyptology. Since the 1950s the museum has been home to the mummy of an approximately 3 year old Egyptian boy who lived around 500BC. His coffin is significantly older, dating to around 1500BC.

There is additionally a focus on social history, with a gallery showing the set up of a traditional Devonshire farmhouse from the 1860s, bequeathed to the museum by Charles Laycock. There is also a section focusing on the Torbay marble industry, which flourished in the 19th century.

== Awards ==
The museum was awarded designated status by the Arts Council for its Quaternary Cave Collection and Archive. The collection consists of around 30,000 items from many local excavated cave sites including Kent's Cavern, along with an associated archive of research materials extending into the first half of the 19th Century.

== Heritage ==
The museum sits within the English Riviera Geopark, which was designated a UNESCO World Heritage Site in 2007. The museum works with the English Riviera Geopark Organisation to help preserve the area's heritage.
