= William Spry (colonial administrator) =

William Spry (died 4 September 1772) was a jurist and governor of Barbados.

On 25 September 1764 he arrived with his family at Halifax, Nova Scotia, having been appointed judge of the vice-admiralty court over all America, which had been recently constituted by an act of Parliament, the Sugar Act 1763 (4 Geo. 3. c. 15). In the proclamation that announces the opening of the court he is styled “The Right Worshipful William Spry, Doctor of Laws.” The other officers of the new court were: vice-admiral, the Earl of Northumberland; registrar, the Hon. Spencer Percival; marshal, Charles Howard, gent. These officers probably expected to fulfil their duties by deputies. Judge Spry opened his court at Halifax on 9 October 1764. Its creation had been opposed in the colonies, and the passage of the Stamp Act the next year, with the accompanying disturbances, probably prevented its extension to other provinces. The Court was abolished in 1768. Judge Spry was appointed Governor of Barbados in June 1767. Spry arrived at Barbados the following year, and died in office in 1772.

== Marriages ==
Spry married twice:

- Firstly to Amelia Pitt, a daughter of Thomas Pitt of Boconnoc (died 1761), a brother of William Pitt, 1st Earl of Chatham.
- Secondly to Katherine Cholmeley (1739-1817), a daughter of Robert Cholmeley (d.1754) of Barbados, a son of James Cholmeley (d.1735) of Easton Hall in Lincolnshire. Katherine's sister Jane Cholmeley (Mrs Leigh-Perrot) was the aunt of the novelist Jane Austen. By Katherine he had a daughter Wilhelmina Spry who married Sir William Earle Welby, 2nd Baronet.
