= William Pengelly =

British geologist

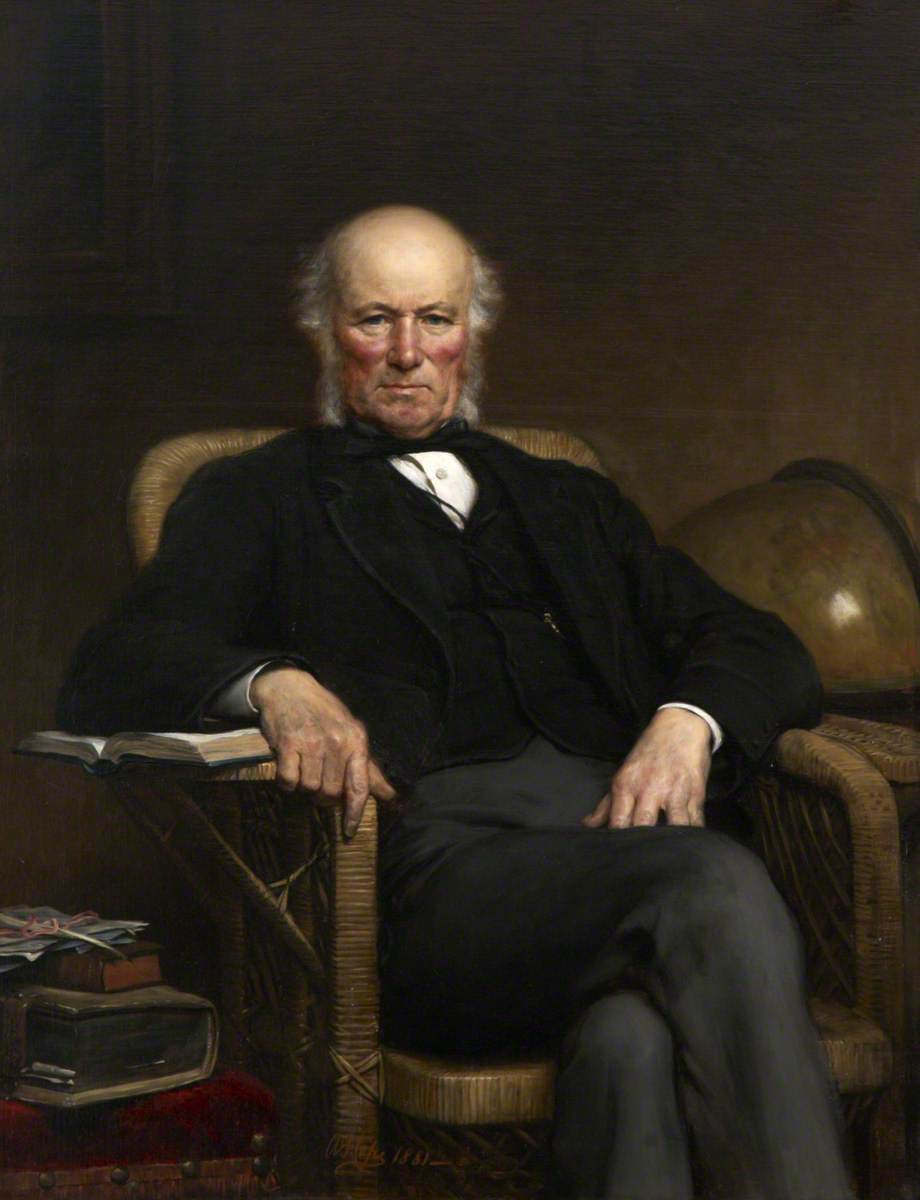
William Pengelly, c. 1882, by Arthur Stockdale Cope

William Pengelly, FRS FGS (12 January 1812 – 16 March 1894) was a British geologist and amateur archaeologist who was one of the first to contribute proof that the Biblical chronology of the earth calculated by Archbishop James Ussher was incorrect.

== Biography ==
Born at East Looe in Cornwall, the son of a sea captain, he left school at the age of 12 to join his father's crew. Returning to Looe while still in his teens, he spent his time reading widely and learning mathematics. In about 1836 he moved to Torquay and opened a day school teaching according to the fashionable Pestalozzian method. In 1846 he gave up his successful school to become a private tutor and also started lecturing on various scientific subjects – a career he continued for the rest of his life.

Pengelly published his first scientific paper in 1849, on fossil fish found in East Cornwall. This was the first of some 120 papers on geology, palaeontology and human prehistory he would publish. In 1862 Pengelly reviewed the geology of the Tertiary lignite deposits of Bovey Tracey in an important paper read to the Royal Society, and the following year was elected a fellow of the society.

Pengelly's desire to educate led him to found the Torquay Young Men's Society (later the Torquay Mechanics' Institute), the Torquay Natural History Society, and (in 1862) the Devonshire Association for the Advancement of Literature, Science, and Art (now The Devonshire Association). He also contributed papers to the Transactions of the Royal Geological Society of Cornwall.

Pengelly married his cousin, Mary Ann Mudge, in 1838. They had three children, before she died in 1851. Two years later he married Lydia Spriggs, a member of a Quaker family, and had two daughters. The younger, Hester, became his biographer. Hester became a writer and, in 1902, married Henry Forbes Julian, a mining engineer, founder of the Royal Automobile Club and co-writer of Cyaniding Gold and Silver Ores. Julian went down with the Titanic.

== Contributions to science ==
Pengelly's most significant contribution to science was his work on caves in Devon and their human occupation. He excavated at Kents Cavern in Devon following earlier work done by Father John MacEnery, and found similar evidence (Palaeolithic flint tools and the bones of extinct animals in the same strata) as MacEnery. Pengelly had the advantage of working in a time of more open geological and religious thinking, which enabled him to find support and funding for the publication of his and MacEnery's work, but sceptics were nevertheless able to oppose his findings, on the grounds that possible later intrusion into earlier layers could not be ruled out in such a frequently excavated cave.

In 1858, however, a newly discovered cave – Windmill Hill Cavern – offered a definitive chance to test Pengelly's theories. Under the auspices (and supervision) of the Royal Society and the Geological Society, he and the archaeologist John Evans were able to conduct a scientific investigation into British prehistory. By exposing an unbroken stalagmite sheet covering the cave floor, and then demonstrating beneath it the co-existence of cave lion and woolly rhinoceros bones with human-crafted flints, Pengelly was able to triumphantly prove the case for the ancient presence of Stone Age man. Pengelly thereafter returned to Kents Cavern in 1864, to spend another fifteen years on careful excavation work to establish man's co-existence with a wholly extinct fauna. His work, along with that of pioneers such as Jacques Boucher de Crèvecœur de Perthes, produced reasoned argument against the traditional Biblical chronology.

Pengelly, on various occasions exchanged letters with Charles Darwin amongst others describing results gathered. These letters are a matter of record. Pengelly's discoveries led him to conclude (amongst others like John Evans) that the traditional Biblical chronology did not appear to match their research, a case made forcefully by them in 1859.

With reference to his election to the Royal Society in 1863, the list of signatories is significant:

- Charles Babbage – Inventor of the Computer
- John Lee – President of the Royal Astronomical Society 1861–63
- Sir Charles Lyell – the father of British Geology
- Hugh Falconer – Scottish Geologist and proponent of Punctuated Equilibrium
- Sir Roderick Murchison – Scottish Geologist described the Silurian System
- Sir Andrew Ramsay – Scottish Geologist, Director-General Geological Survey
- Rev. John Barlow – Secretary of the Royal Institution of Great Britain 1843–1860
- Leonard Horner – Scottish Geologist, President Geological Society 1846 & 1860
- Joseph Beete Jukes – English Geologist – early survey of Newfoundland (1839–40), first complete map of geology of Australia (1850)
- John Percy – Physician
- Charles Manby – Civil Engineer, Bishop of Exeter and president of the Devonshire Association 1872–3

Also James Yates, Henry Bristow (Geology), Charles Daubeny (Chemist), B Stewart (Physicist), Prof. David Ansted (King's College London)

== See also ==
- Antiquity of man
- Édouard Lartet

== Bibliography ==
- Van Riper, A. Bowdoin (1993). Men Among the Mammoths. University of Chicago Press. p. 77. ISBN 978-0226849911.
- McCalla, Arthur (2006). The Creationist Debate: The Encounter Between the Bible and the Historical Mind. Bloomsbury Academic. p. 125. ISBN 978-0826480026.
- Pengelly, Hester, ed. (1897). A memoir of William Pengelly, of Torquay, F.R.S., geologist, with a selection of his correspondence. London: John Murray.
