= English Riviera Geopark =

Geopark in England

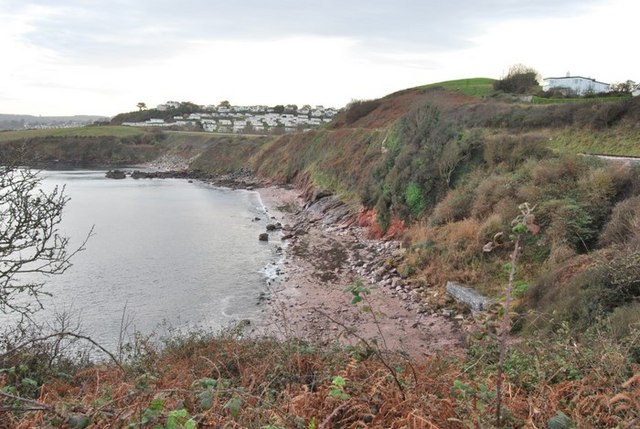
- Saltern Cove is a Site of Special Scientific Interest and part of the English Riviera Geopark

- Location within Devon
- Coordinates: 50.44°N 3.55°W
- Designation: UNESCO Global Geopark
- Designated: UNESCO
- Website: Official website

The English Riviera Geopark (ERG) in Torbay is one of eight UNESCO Global Geoparks in the United Kingdom, and one of over one hundred and seventy worldwide. It is one of only two urban Geoparks in the UK, and joined the Global Geoparks Network on 16 September 2007. The Geopark covers 6,200 hectares of land and 4,100 hectares of sea bed.

Geopark status was granted to Torbay on the grounds that the area has a varied geology covering several geological periods, which are exposed at the surface in many areas, and also that Torbay Council and other bodies have worked to promote the area's distinctive geology to the community via education.

== Selected sites ==
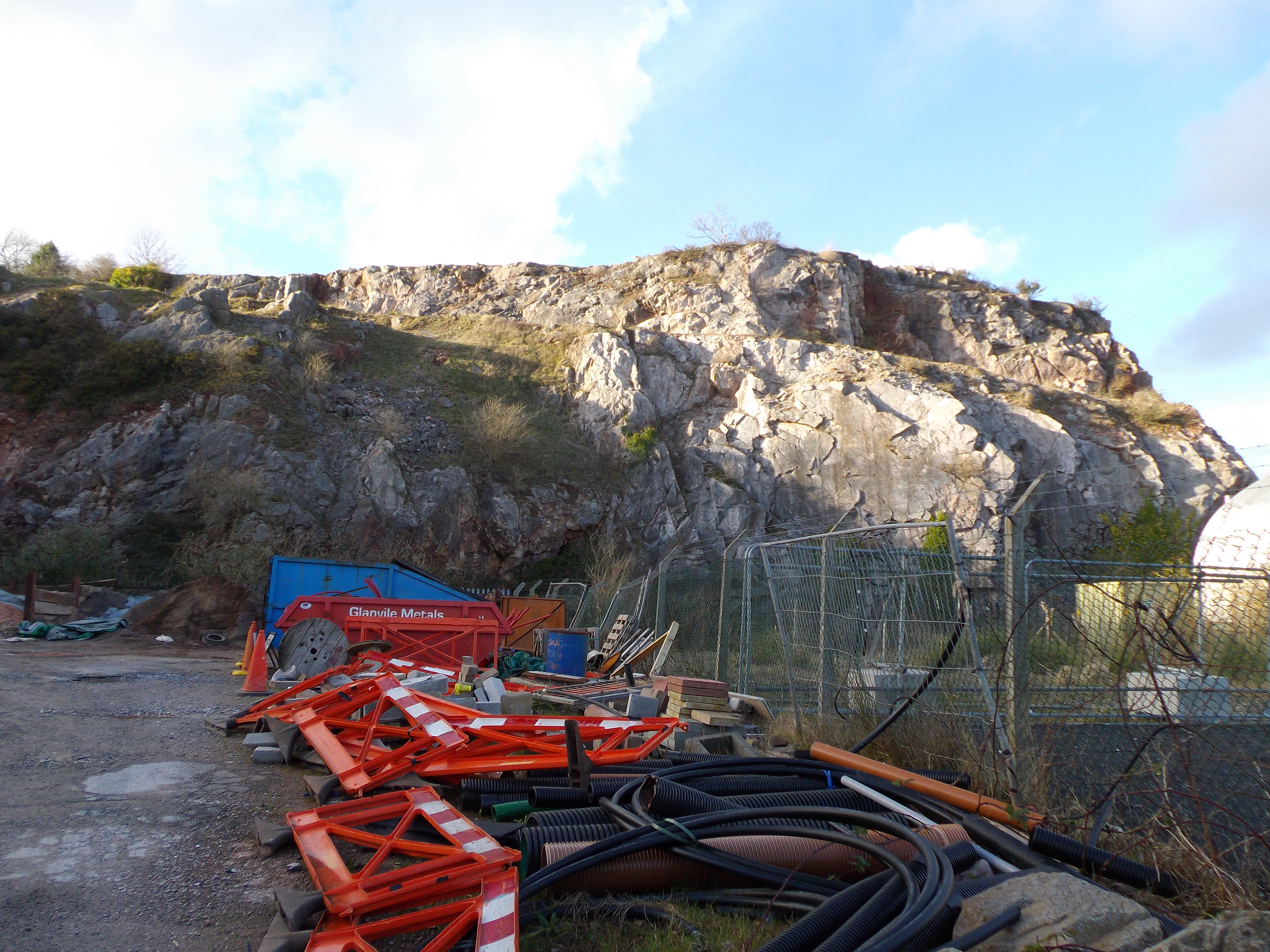
Lummaton Quarry, Torquay.

Many places in Torbay are Geopark attractions. Babbacombe Cliffs have upside down layering of slates and limestone formed during the Variscan Orogeny. Permian red breccia is also visible there. There are exposed marine cave systems between Berry Head and Sharkham Point. Between Black Head and Anstey's Cove is Torbay's largest outcrop of igneous rock. Crystal Cove has a 25 metre wide zone of calcite. Kents Cavern and Brixham Cavern contained fossils of the now extinct woolly rhinoceros and cave lion. Dyers Quarry is rich in coral fossilised in its growing position, as well as Late Eifelian limestone. Hollicombe Head to Corbyn Head have features of alluvial fan conglomerate deposits and seasonal river sandstones, both Permian in origin. Hopes Nose features gold and palladium mineral deposits left by hydrothermal fluids, and the area is also important for the study of Quaternary stratigraphy and sea level change. Long Quarry features evidence of the development, formation and growth of a stromatoporoid reef. Lummaton Quarry's shell deposits led to the naming of the Devonian period. Saltern Cove is a regionally important unconformity and Site of Special Scientific Interest.

== Geology of the Geopark ==
=== Devonian ===
The earliest rocks within the Geopark were deposited in environments not unlike the Caribbean today; warm, life-rich shallow seas provided the geopark with the Torbay Limestones and sandstones. At the same time, volcanic eruptions blanketed these sediments with volcanic ash.
The limestone was held together by hard sponges known as stromatoporoids - modern corals that we are accustomed to today were yet to evolve, but early corals did thrive alongside crinoids, gastropods, brachiopods, trilobites and goniatites (early relatives of ammonites). At this time the area was south of the equator.

=== Carboniferous ===
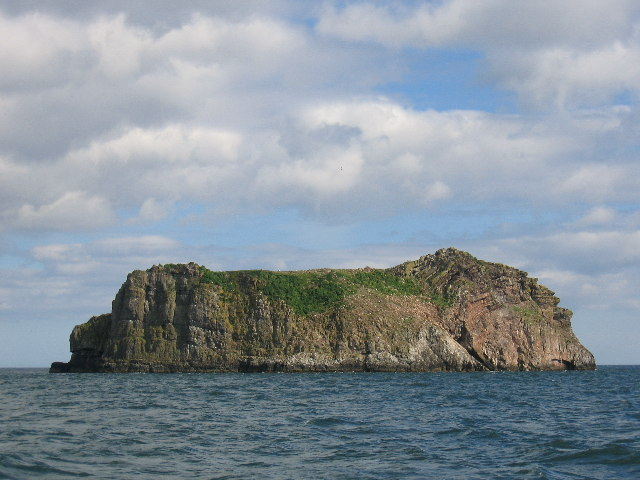
Ore Stone.

During the Carboniferous period the limestones and sandstones of the Devonian were forced up by the Variscan Orogeny which affected what are now Devon and Cornwall (forming the granites of Dartmoor) and stretched as far as the Czech Republic in the East and North America in the west (although at his point the Atlantic did not exist). This mountain-building event had a massive effect on the future geopark, tilting sediments and forming the beautiful fold on the island of Ore Stone.

=== Permian ===
280 million years ago continental collision had brought the geopark into the centre of Pangea and into the middle of a huge desert, at a similar latitude to the modern-day Sahara. This desert is preserved as both windblown, fine sandstones which form Roundham Head, and breccia which was deposited after large storms and flash floods that periodically occurred within the usually parched desert. These rocks stretch across the UK and are found as far afield as Yorkshire. Collectively they are known as the New Red Sandstone. Their red colour (and thus the colour of the soil overlaying them) is derived from groundwater under the desert caused iron in the sediments to alter to haematite, which also stained the underlying grey Devonian limestones.

=== Mesozoic and Tertiary ===
During the Triassic, Jurassic, Cretaceous and Tertiary periods sediments may have been deposited over the Geopark; but later erosion has removed them, leaving no trace; however activity elsewhere across the globe has left impressions on the geopark; the collision of Africa and Europe has been felt in the Geopark, leaving the bay crisscrossed with faults as a result of the huge pressures.

=== Quaternary ===
Solution of the limestone led to the formation of caves, and deposition of speleothems. The most important cave in the geopark is Kents Cavern.

== See also ==
- International Network of Geoparks
- List of national geoparks
