= Windmill Hill Cavern =

Cave and archaeological site in Devon, England

- Windmill Hill Cave, Brixham Cave, Brixham Bone Cavern, Philp's Cave
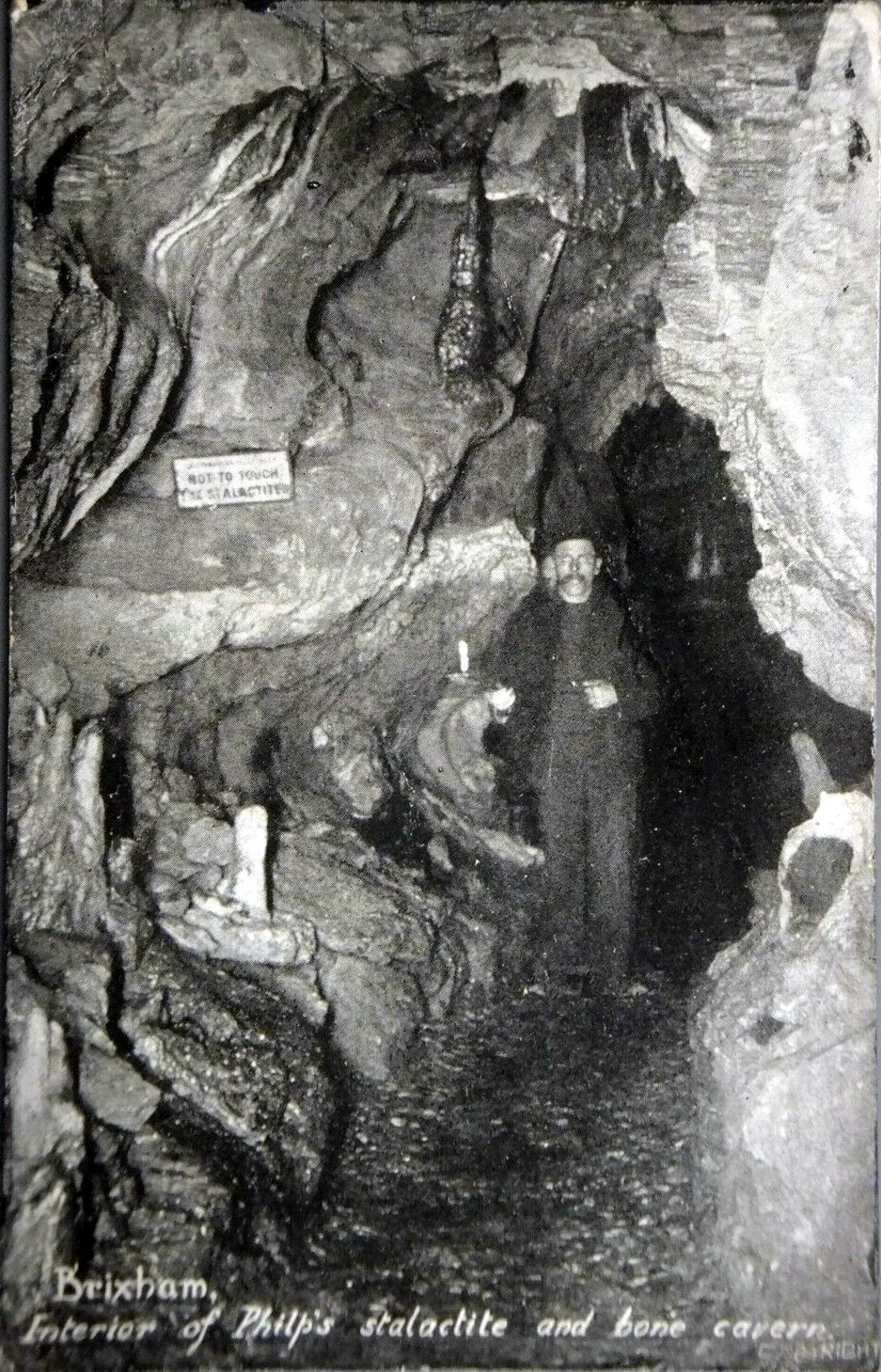
- A postcard of the cave from about 1900

- Location within Devon
- Location: Beneath 107 Mount Pleasant Road, Brixham
- OS grid: SX 92457 55983
- Coordinates: 50.394046°N 3.514226°W
- Length: 96 metres (315 ft)
- Elevation: 30 metres (98 ft)
- Discovery: 15 January 1858
- Geology: Devonian limestone
- Entrances: 5, 4 of which are blocked
- Access: Closed to the public

Windmill Hill Cavern (also called Windmill Hill Cave, the Brixham Cave, Brixham Bone Cavern and Philp's Cave) is a limestone cave system in the town of Brixham, Devon. It was discovered in 1858 and later excavated by a team led by the geologist William Pengelly, who found proof that humans co-existed with extinct British fauna.

== Discovery ==
Windmill Hill Cavern was a chance discovery in 1858 by builder John Lane Philp, who was searching for a pickaxe that had fallen into a hole in the ground during construction of a house on Mount Pleasant Road in the northwestern part of Windmill Hill and incidentally came across the cave.

Upon hearing about Philp's discovery, the Geological Society of London drew up a lease to secure an excavation of the cavern. William Pengelly, a British geologist and paleontologist, was selected to lead the excavation of the cavern, with geologist Hugh Falconer, supervised by Pengelly, outlining the operation plans for the exploration before beginning.

== Excavation ==
In excavating the cave, the team used a grid system, an exploration technique that had never been used until that time. During the excavation, 36 Palaeolithic artifacts were discovered, the first being a flint knife. Some of the artifacts were associated with fossils of extinct animals, which prompted Pengelly and some of the more sceptical members of his team to dig deeper for proof that humans lived amongst extinct British animals. After studying the flint artifacts at the Somme River Valley's gravel terraces, the more sceptical members of Pengelly's team, such as Joseph Prestwich, found the proof that they sought that humans and extinct British animals had once lived amongst each other. Remains of animals found in the cave included those of extinct species such as aurochs and woolly mammoth, as well as still extant taxa now absent from Europe, such as the spotted hyena.

== Operations ==
Windmill Hill Cavern was open to the public at one point as a show cave, but later closed. The cavern is listed under Section 1 of the Ancient Monuments and Archaeological Areas Act 1979.
