= RAF Wymeswold =

Former Royal Air Force station in Leicestershire, England

RAF Wymeswold
- Wymeswold, Leicestershire in England

Site information
- Type: Satellite Station
- Code: WD
- Owner: Air Ministry
- Operator: Royal Air Force
- Controlled by: RAF Bomber Command 1942-44 * No. 7 (T) Group RAF * No. 93 (OTU) Group RAF; RAF Transport Command 1944- * No. 44 Group RAF

Location
- Shown within Leicestershire RAF Wymeswold (the United Kingdom)
- Coordinates: 52°47′35″N 001°07′36″W
- Grid reference: SK585225

Site history
- Built: 1941/42
- In use: May 1942 - 1957
- Battles/wars: European theatre of World War II

Airfield information
- Elevation: 83 metres (272 ft) AMSL
Runways
Direction	Length and surface
03/21	1,143 metres (3,750 ft) Tarmac on concrete
08/26	1,830 metres (6,004 ft) Tarmac on concrete
14/32	1,143 metres (3,750 ft) Tarmac on concrete

Royal Air Force Wymeswold, or more simply RAF Wymeswold, is a former Royal Air Force satellite station located 3.5 miles (5.6 km) north-east of Loughborough, Leicestershire, England. The airfield is situated between Hoton, Wymeswold and Burton on the Wolds, lying in the current district of Charnwood.

== History ==
It was opened on 16 May 1942 during the Second World War and was home to Vickers Wellington bombers amongst others. Its Wellingtons were occasionally used for operations over Germany, dropping 'Nickel' (leaflets) but the main role was training: bomber pilots until 1944, then, with RAF Transport Command, Douglas Dakota pilots. It also operated Hampdens in the training role to tow Horsa gliders prior to the D-Day landings and various other aircraft including Hurricanes in air gunnery training. Visits from other aircraft took place with a large contingent of USAAF C47s on at least one occasion in 1944 prior to the D-Day landings.

RAF Castle Donington was used as a satellite airfield which post-war has turned into East Midlands Airport.

=== Post-war ===
From 1949 it was part of Fighter Command, with 504 (County of Nottingham) Squadron, RAuxAF (Royal Auxiliary Air Force) moving from RAF Hucknall. The RAuxAF volunteer pilots flew every weekend, sometimes in the week and the squadron included several full-time regular RAF pilots. The ground staff were a similar mix with the volunteer majority being drawn from the local area. The first of 504's Spitfire Mk.22s arrived on 2 April and the full squadron, with two Harvard trainers was in residence by the end of May. 504 Sqn had the honour of being the first RAuxAF squadron to be equipped with the jet-engined Gloster Meteor and on 17 October two Meteor T7 trainers arrived, followed on the 19th by the first F.4 single seat fighter. All the Spitfire Mk.22s were replaced by early Spring 1950 although the Harvard trainers were retained for some time. In turn the Meteor F.4s were replaced in January 1952 by the more powerful Meteor F.4 which 504 Sqn flew from Wymeswold until 1957 when the RAuxAF was disbanded. This led to the closure of the airfield for frontline RAF flying but it continued to be used as a satellite to RAF Syerston (near Newark) and No 2 Flying Training School, flying Hunting Provost and (after 1959) Jet Provost initial training aircraft.

=== Closure ===
It was closed as an RAF station in early 1957, although it continued to be used for aircraft maintenance by various private organisations until 1968.

== Units ==
During the Second World War the airfield was home to Operational Training Units, however post war the airfield was used by squadrons flying new jets like the Hawker Hunter.

- No. 28 Operational Training Unit (OTU) (part of 93 Group, Bomber Command) from May 1942 until October 1944 using the Short Stirling, Handley Page Halifax and the Avro Lancaster.
- No. 108 OTU (44 Group, Transport Command) from 15 October 1944 until August 1945 before being turned into No. 1382 Operational Conversion Unit RAF (4 Group) operating until December 1947 using the Airspeed Oxford, Miles Magister and the Dakota.
- 504 Sqn (12 Group, Royal Auxiliary Air Force) from 3 May 1949 until 12 February 1957 flying the Gloster Meteor F.8
- 664 Sqn (1969 Flight) from July 1954 until 10 March 1956.
- 56 Sqn from August 1955 until 1957 with the Hawker Hunter.
- 257 Sqn and 263 Sqn (temporary base from RAF Wattisham) using the Hawker Hunter.
- Relief Landing Ground for No. 1 Flying Training School RAF from January 1958
- Relief Landing Ground for No. 2 Flying Training School RAF between January 1958 and December 1966 became No. 2 (Basic) Flying Training School RAF between January 1967 and January 1970
- No. 16 Service Flying Training School RAF during July 1942
- No. 49 Gliding School RAF between 1945 and May 1946 with the Cadet and Sedbergh TX.1
- No. 1521 (Beam Approach Training) Flight RAF between June 1943 and October 1945 with the Oxford and Stirling

== Current use ==
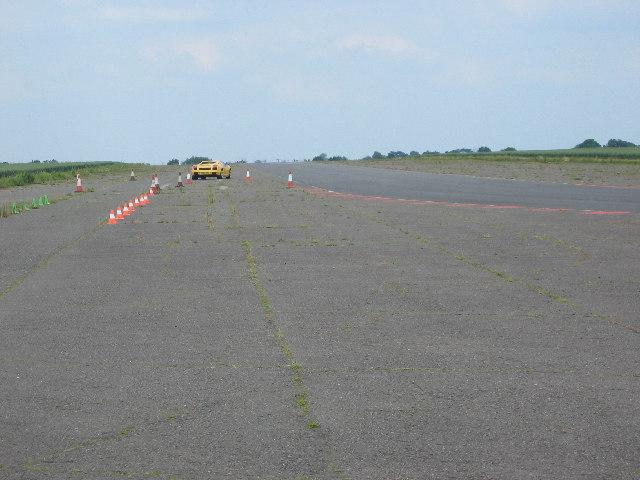
Airfield today

The airfield is now disused although many of the original buildings remain and there is currently an industrial estate on the site; the runway still exists and is used for motorsport.

The airfield is home to the UK's largest solar farm.

The airfield and associated buildings lie outside the civil parish of Wymeswold, with the north half being in Hoton, and the southern half in Prestwold. On the eastern fringe of the airfield is the Wymeswold Industrial Estate, where there is a go-karting facility. The Hoton-Wymeswold road runs alongside the airfield.

The airfield has also been host for regattas of land sailing.

In the early 1990s, there were plans for a 6,000 population new town to be built on the airfield.

== Accidents and incidents ==
- On 14 April 1944 at around 16.30, Airspeed Oxford LB415 from 1521 Flight from the airfield collided with Avro Lancaster W4103 RC-E, from the 5 Lancaster Finishing School at RAF Syerston, over the Nottinghamshire village of Screveton.
- On Saturday 7 July 1951, a Meteor from 504 squadron at Wymeswold, piloted by Pilot Officer H Elliot (RAuxAF), ran out of fuel. The pilot was killed.

== See also ==
- List of Royal Air Force Conversion Units
- List of former Royal Air Force stations
