= St Andrew's Church, Prestwold =

St Andrew's, Prestwold
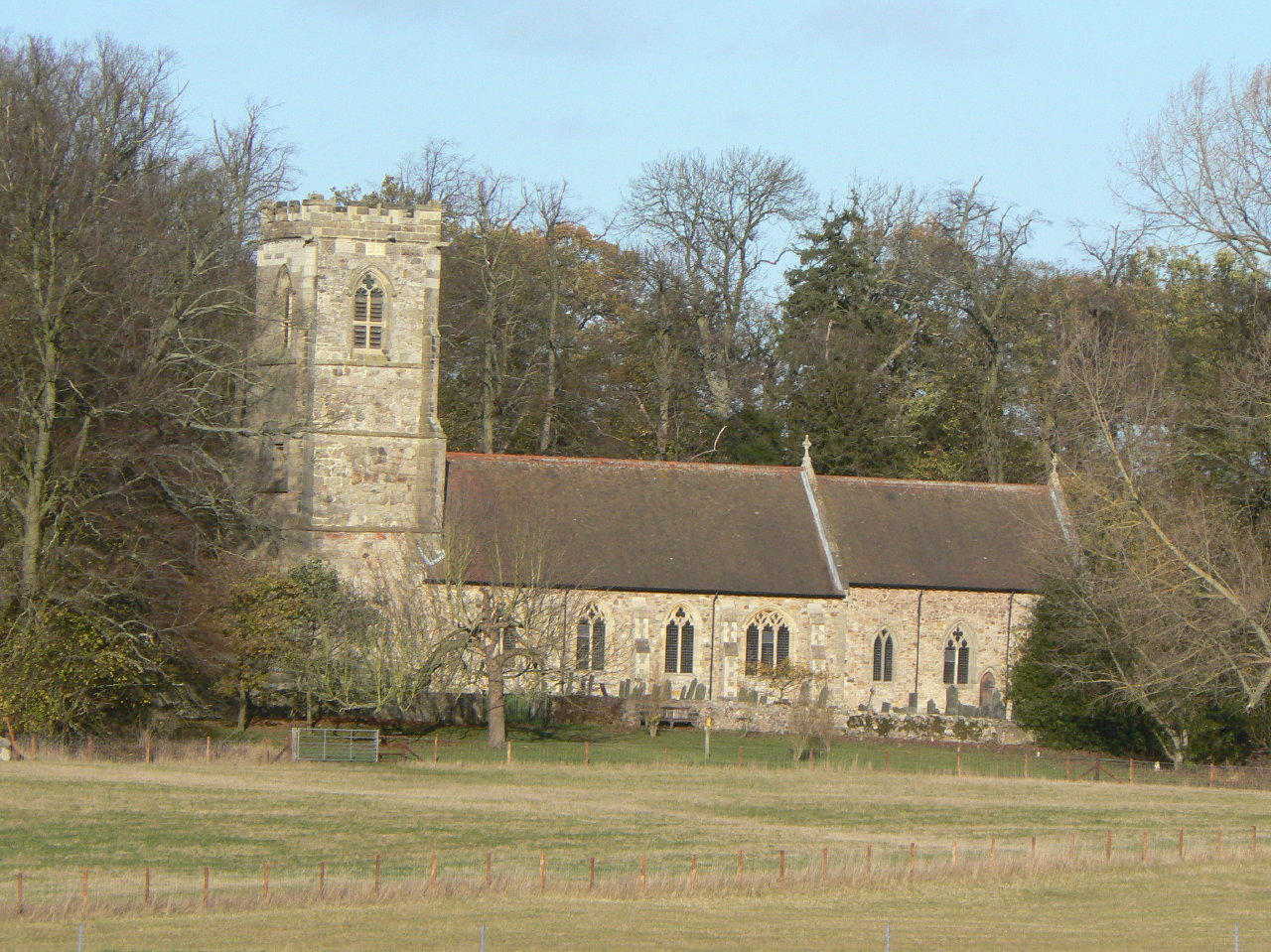
- St Andrew's, Prestwold
- 52.7875°N 1.1446°W
- OS grid reference: SK 57782 21444
- Location: Prestwold, Leicestershire
- Country: England
- Denomination: Anglican
- Website: http://www.barrowandwoldsgroup.com/st-andrews-prestwold

History
- Dedication: Saint Andrew

Architecture
- Heritage designation: Grade II*
- Designated: 1 June 1966

Administration
- Province: Canterbury
- Diocese: Leicester

St. Andrew's is a Grade II* medieval parish church situated near Prestwold Hall. The church serves the villages of Prestwold, Burton-on-the-Wolds, Cotes and Hoton.

== Description ==
=== Current benefice ===
St Andrew's forms part of a wider group of churches described as the Barrow and Wolds Group. The group is currently headed by a Priest-in-Charge who is aided by a number of lay readers. The church falls within the Loughborough Archdeaconry, and Akeley East Deanery. The legal name of the parish is Prestwold with Hoton.

The Barrow & Wolds Group also includes:

- Holy Trinity Church, Barrow upon Soar
- St Mary's Church, Wymeswold
- St Mary's Church, Walton on the Wolds

=== Services ===
The church holds a communion service every Sunday at 9:15 AM.

== Heritage ==
The oldest recorded part of the church is the west tower, which dates back to the late 14th century. The church underwent two restorations, one in 1743 and the other 1890. While the 1743 restoration consisted mainly of general repairs, the 1890 restoration, by the Mr Hussey Packe, included the rebuilding of the nave in the Perpendicular style. The church contains a number of monuments to the Packe family.
