= Hoton, Leicestershire =

Village in Charnwood, Leicestershire, England

Coordinates: 52.7976°N 1.14902°W

Hoton
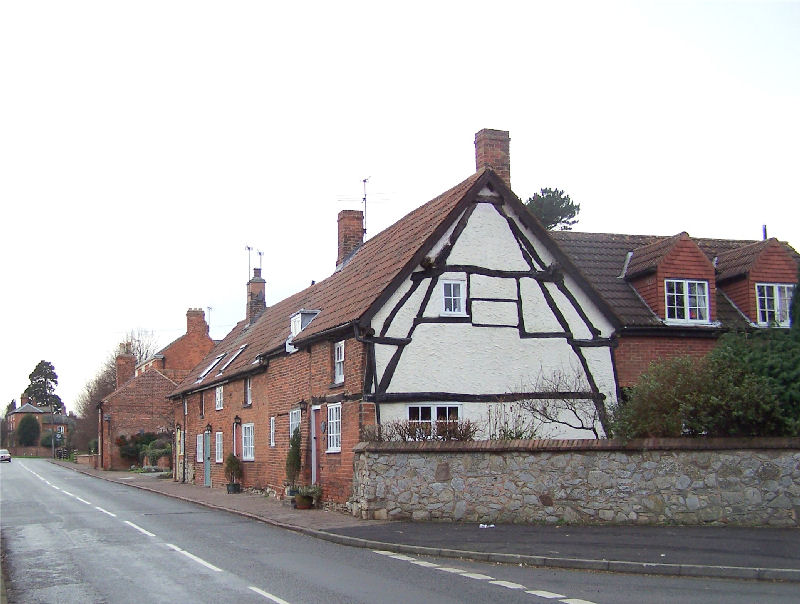
- Hoton Village

- Location within Leicestershire
- OS grid reference: SK 57475 22566
- District: Charnwood
- Shire county: Leicestershire
- Region: East Midlands
- Country: England
- Sovereign state: United Kingdom
- Post town: LOUGHBOROUGH
- Postcode district: LE12
- Dialling code: 01509
- Police: Leicestershire
- Fire: Leicestershire
- Ambulance: East Midlands
- UK Parliament: Loughborough

Hoton is a village and civil parish in the Charnwood district of Leicestershire, England, on the A60 north-east of Loughborough, just south of the border with Nottinghamshire. Nearby places are Prestwold (to the south), Wymeswold (to the east), and Rempstone (to the north, in Nottinghamshire). At the 2011 Census, the population was 353.

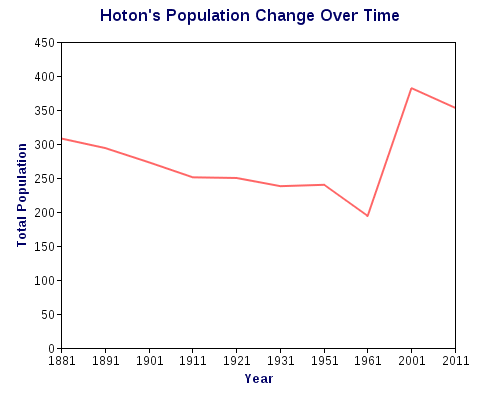
Total Population of Hoton as reported by the census population 1811-2011

In 1870, Hoton was described as:

"A township and chapelry in Prestwold parish, Leicester; near the river Soar and the boundary with Notts, 3¼ miles NE of Loughborough railway station"

== History ==
Hoton Inclosure Act 1758
- Act of Parliament
- Parliament of Great Britain
- Long title: An Act for dividing and enclosing the Open and Common Fields of Hoton, in the County of Leicester, and all the Lands and Grounds within the same Fields.
- Citation: 32 Geo. 2. c. 43 Pr.
- Territorial extent: Great Britain

Dates
- Royal assent: 2 June 1759
- Commencement: 23 November 1758 (Note: Start of session.)

Status: Current legislation

After the Norman Conquest in 1066, together Robert De Jort and Earl Hugh owned the land. Hoton was sparsely populated with eleven households in the 1300s, nine in 1564. By the time the 1666 hearth tax list was drawn up there were nineteen. Hoton once consisted of three 400-acre patches of agricultural land, though due to the Hoton Inclosure Act 1758 (32 Geo. 2. c. 43 Pr.) more small fields were established and agricultural patterns changed. When Charles James Packe II brought the Hoton Manor house it led to the development of the area. An ale house, an inn and two girls’ boarding schools were built, as well as further farm buildings and cottages, leading to a further increase in population.

Despite this the census reports show a decline in population from 460 people in 94 houses in 1841, to 294 people in 78 houses by 1891.

Throughout the 1800s Hoton saw various changes that improved the parish. Care for the poor, maintenance of roads and facilities were all carried out by able-bodied men in the area. Many old wooden-built cottages were replaced by brick cottages, as well as given small allotments to give farmers extra growing space for personal use. Sanitation was improved as many toilets were now outside rather than within the home, preventing the spread of disease. Despite this as late as the 1880s cases of typhoid, diphtheria and ringworm we still being treated.

The name of the village, Hoton, was historically spelled Houghton.

== Demographics ==
Occupation in Hoton is significantly different between 1881 and 2011. Most of the work in 1881 was unknown especially for females, this most likely due to the old patriarchal society of the time. Only workers in dress had a higher female occupation in 1881, all other occupations men had a greater number workers. In contrast in 2011 occupation shifts to more modern jobs and statistics are taken as a total population not male and female. The highest number of people work in professional occupations (46) and the lowest in process, plant and machine operatives. The significant difference in type of occupation is down to the dramatic changes over time. Through the industrial revolution removing significant agriculture reliance to the new computer age of the 21st century.

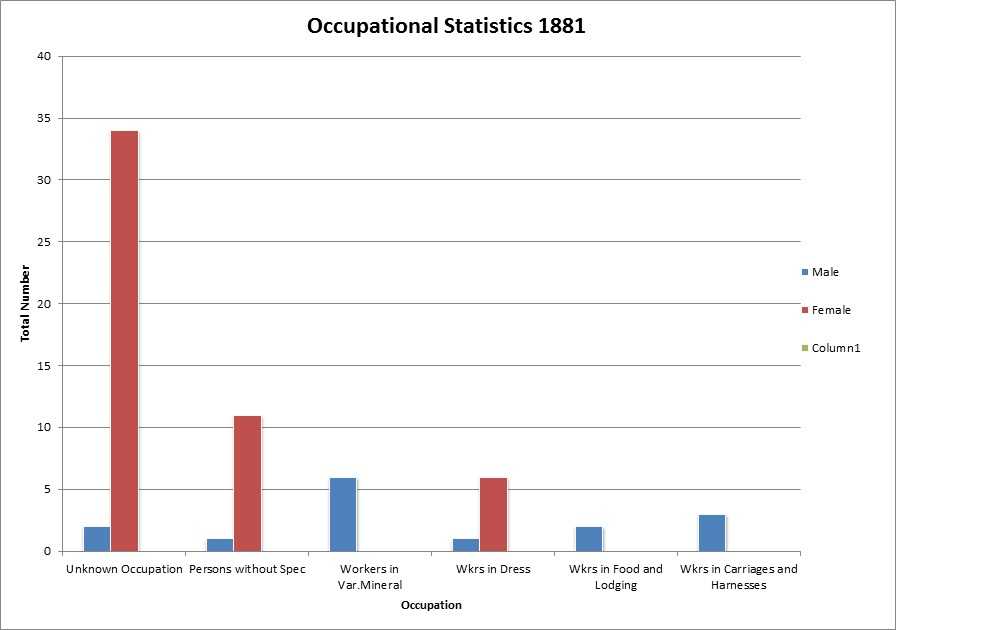
Occupational Statistics 1881

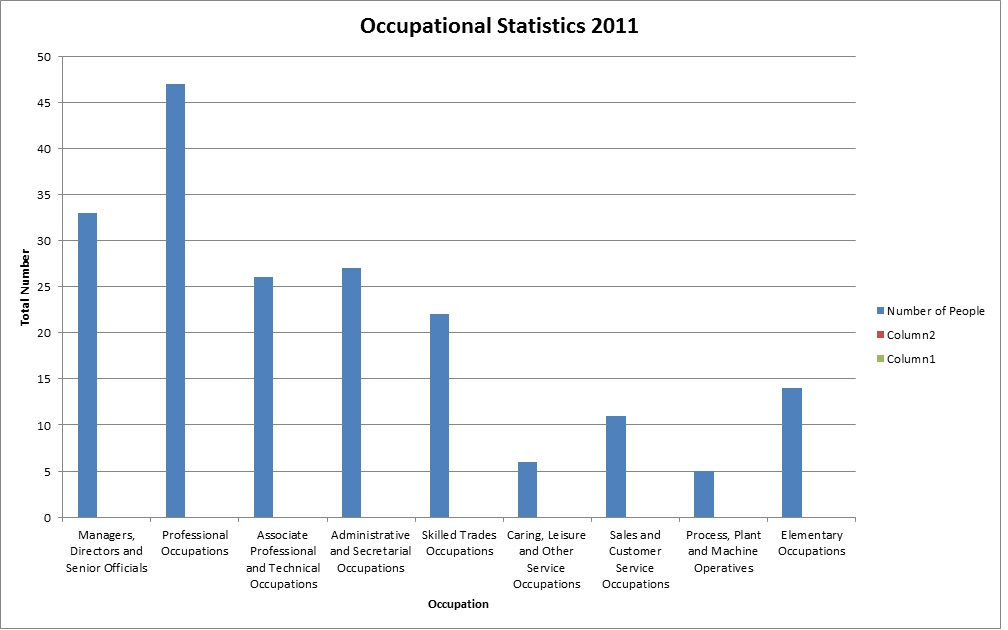
Occupational Statistics 2011

== Places of interest ==
=== Church of Saint Leonard ===
St. Leonards is an old church located on Wymeswold Road and is now a private residence. (The nearest place of worship is now located in Prestwold, St Andrew's Church). The church had financial issues which concluded with the closure. The major decline began after World War II, land was becoming privately owned which meant the church lost a significant number of its farms. In an attempt to help, the church volunteers helped level out the church grounds in 1969, though after this the structural condition of the church itself only declined. The various contents of the church were given to different churches, most notably the organ to Wartnaby and the pews to Branston.

== Transport ==
Bus - There are two bus services that run through Hoton. The Kinchbus 9 service connects Loughborough and Nottingham via the A60, stopping once in Hoton. This service runs up to every 30 minutes. The stops are between 50 and 70 yards southwest of Vine Tree Terrace. On the edge of the village, to the south, Centrebus' service 8 stops at Prestwold Lane.

Train - The closest stations are Loughborough railway station, which is 2 miles southwest of Hoton and Barrow-upon-Soar railway station which is 2 miles south of Hoton. The former is off the A60 and served by both aforementioned bus services.

Road - The A60 main road runs through the village to Nottingham, Mansfield and Worksop to the north and Loughborough to the south west. The A60 connects to the A6, the main road running between Luton and Carlisle via Bedford, Leicester, Derby and Manchester, in Loughborough, and the M1 motorway can be reached by going further west via the A512, the main road between Loughborough and Ashby-de-la-Zouch.

== Schools ==
The nearest primary school to Hoton is Burton on the Wolds primary school. The school is a maintained school 1.3 miles away from the centre of Hoton. The nearest larger capacity secondary school is Limehurst Academy. Limehurst is a mixed academy school located 2.9 miles away towards Loughborough. Limehurst Academy was considered as good in an Ofsted report carried out in April 2013.
