= South Lincolnshire =

Parliamentary constituency in the United Kingdom, 1832–1885

- Former county constituency for the House of Commons
- Context of 1832-1868. Extract from 1837 result: the southern 'doubly' orange land.
- County: Lincolnshire

1832–1885
- Seats: Two
- Created from: Lincolnshire
- Replaced by: Sleaford or North Kesteven; Stamford or South Kesteven; Spalding or Holland

South Lincolnshire, formally called the Southern Division of Lincolnshire or Parts of Kesteven and Holland, was a county constituency in Lincolnshire. It returned two Members of Parliament (MPs) to the House of Commons of the Parliament of the United Kingdom, elected by the bloc vote electoral system.

== History ==
The constituency was created by the Reform Act 1832 for the 1832 general election. It was abolished by the Redistribution of Seats Act 1885 for the 1885 general election.

== Boundaries ==
1832–1868: The Parts of Kesteven and Holland.

1868–1885: The Wapentakes, Hundreds, or Sokes of Loveden, Flaxwell, Aswardburn, Winnibriggs and Threo, Aveland, Beltisloe, Ness, Grantham Soke, Skirbeck, Kirton and Holland Elloe.

== Members of Parliament ==
Election	1st Member	1st Party	2nd Member	2nd Party
1832	Henry Handley	Whig	Gilbert Heathcote	Whig
1841	Christopher Turnor	Conservative	Sir John Trollope, Bt	Conservative
1847	Lord Burghley	Conservative	Sir John Trollope, Bt	Conservative
1857	Anthony Wilson	Conservative	Sir John Trollope, Bt	Conservative
1859	George Hussey Packe	Liberal	Sir John Trollope, Bt	Conservative
Apr 1868	George Hussey Packe	Liberal	William Welby	Conservative
Nov 1868	Edmund Turnor	Conservative	William Welby	Conservative
1880	John Lawrance	Conservative	William Welby	Conservative
Feb 1884	John Lawrance	Conservative	Hon. Murray Finch-Hatton	Conservative
1885	Redistribution of Seats Act: constituency abolished			

== Election results ==
=== Elections in the 1830s ===
General election 1832: South Lincolnshire
Party	Candidate	Votes	%
Whig	Henry Handley	Unopposed	
Whig	Gilbert Heathcote	Unopposed	
Registered electors		7,956	
Whig win (new seat)			
Whig win (new seat)			

General election 1835: South Lincolnshire
Party	Candidate	Votes	%
Whig	Henry Handley	Unopposed	
Whig	Gilbert Heathcote	Unopposed	
Registered electors		7,694	
Whig hold			
Whig hold			

General election 1837: South Lincolnshire
Party	Candidate	Votes	%
Whig	Henry Handley	Unopposed	
Whig	Gilbert Heathcote	Unopposed	
Registered electors		8,100	
Whig hold			
Whig hold			

=== Elections in the 1840s ===
General election 1841: South Lincolnshire
Party	Candidate	Votes	%	±%
Conservative	Christopher Turnor	4,581	37.9	New
Conservative	John Trollope	4,562	37.7	New
Whig	Henry Handley	2,948	24.4	N/A
Majority		1,614	13.3	N/A
Turnout		7,020	78.8	N/A
Registered electors		8,914		
Conservative gain from Whig		Swing	N/A	
Conservative gain from Whig		Swing	N/A	

General election 1847: South Lincolnshire
Party	Candidate	Votes	%	±%
Conservative	William Cecil	Unopposed		
Conservative	John Trollope	Unopposed		
Registered electors		9,226		
Conservative hold				
Conservative hold				

=== Elections in the 1850s ===
Trollope was appointed President of the Poor Law Board, requiring a by-election.

By-election, 12 March 1852: South Lincolnshire
Party	Candidate	Votes	%	±%
Conservative	John Trollope	Unopposed		
Conservative hold				

General election 1852: South Lincolnshire
Party	Candidate	Votes	%	±%
Conservative	William Cecil	Unopposed		
Conservative	John Trollope	Unopposed		
Registered electors		8,554		
Conservative hold				
Conservative hold				

General election 1857: South Lincolnshire
Party	Candidate	Votes	%	±%
Conservative	John Trollope	4,020	37.1	N/A
Conservative	Anthony Wilson	3,636	33.5	N/A
Whig	George Hussey Packe	3,188	29.4	New
Majority		448	4.1	N/A
Turnout		7,016 (est)	84.7 (est)	N/A
Registered electors		8,287		
Conservative hold				
Conservative hold				

General election 1859: South Lincolnshire
Party	Candidate	Votes	%	±%
Liberal	George Hussey Packe	Unopposed		
Conservative	John Trollope	Unopposed		
Registered electors		9,435		
Liberal gain from Conservative				
Conservative hold				

=== Elections in the 1860s ===
General election 1865: South Lincolnshire
Party	Candidate	Votes	%	±%
Liberal	George Hussey Packe	Unopposed		
Conservative	John Trollope	Unopposed		
Registered electors		9,260		
Liberal hold				
Conservative hold				

Trollope was elevated to the peerage, becoming Lord Kesteven, causing a by-election.

By-election, 29 April 1868: South Lincolnshire
Party	Candidate	Votes	%	±%
Conservative	William Welby	Unopposed		
Conservative hold				

General election 1868: South Lincolnshire
Party	Candidate	Votes	%	±%
Conservative	William Welby	4,514	39.9	N/A
Conservative	Edmund Turnor	4,078	36.1	N/A
Liberal	George Hussey Packe	2,714	24.0	N/A
Liberal	John Taylor	3	0.0	N/A
Majority		1,364	12.1	N/A
Turnout		7,010 (est)	66.9 (est)	N/A
Registered electors		10,476		
Conservative hold				
Conservative gain from Liberal				

=== Elections in the 1870s ===
General election 1874: South Lincolnshire
Party	Candidate	Votes	%	±%
Conservative	Edmund Turnor	Unopposed		
Conservative	William Welby	Unopposed		
Registered electors		11,020		
Conservative hold				
Conservative hold				

=== Elections in the 1880s ===
General election 1880: South Lincolnshire
Party	Candidate	Votes	%	±%
Conservative	John Lawrance	4,518	36.5	N/A
Conservative	William Welby-Gregory	4,290	34.6	N/A
Liberal	Charles Sharpe	3,583	28.9	New
Majority		707	5.7	N/A
Turnout		7,987 (est)	74.6 (est)	N/A
Registered electors		10,710		
Conservative hold		Swing	N/A	
Conservative hold		Swing	N/A	

Welby-Gregory resigned, causing a by-election.

By-election, 29 Feb 1884: South Lincolnshire
Party	Candidate	Votes	%	±%
Conservative	Murray Finch-Hatton	Unopposed		
Conservative hold				

== Sources ==
- Leigh Rayment's Historical List of MPs – Constituencies beginning with "L" (part 3)
