= Edward Packe =

British civil servant

Sir Sir Edward Hussey Packe KBE DL JP

High Sheriff of Leicestershire
- In office 1911–1912

Chairman of Leicestershire County Council

Personal details
- Born: January 6, 1878
- Died: May 11, 1946 (aged 68)
- Spouse: Hon. Mary Sydney Colebrooke
- Children: Penelope Mary Packe, Ursula Sybil Packe
- Education: Eton College
- Occupation: Civil servant
- Awards: Knight Commander of the Order of the British Empire (KBE), Legion of Honour, Order of the Crown of Italy

Sir Edward Hussey Packe KBE DL JP (6 January 1878 – 11 May 1946) was a British civil servant.

== Early life ==
He was the son of Hussey Packe and his wife, Lady Alice, only daughter of John Wodehouse, 1st Earl of Kimberley. His grandfather was politician George Hussey Packe. He was educated at Eton College.

== Public duty ==
He was High Sheriff of Leicestershire in 1911, and Chairman of Leicestershire County Council

== Civil Service ==
- Assistant Private Secretary to The Most Honourable Henry Petty-FitzMaurice, 6th Marquess of Lansdowne at War Office (1900)
- Assistant Private Secretary to Right Honourable William Palmer, 2nd Earl of Selborne at the Admiralty (1901–1905)
- Assistant Private Secretary to Right Honourable Frederick Archibald Vaughan Campbell, 3rd Earl Cawdor (1905)
- Assistant Private Secretary to Right Honourable Arthur James Balfour, 1st Earl of Balfour (1916)
- Assistant Private Secretary to Sir Edward Carson (1916–1917)
- Private Secretary to Sir Eric Geddes (1917–1919)
- Private Secretary to Walter Long (1919)
- Attached to Admiralty Staff (1914–1919)

== Honours ==
He was appointed a Knight Commander of the Order of the British Empire (KBE) in the 1920 New Year Honours for service as private secretary to successive First Lords of the Admiralty. He was also awarded the Legion of Honour and the Order of Crown of Italy.

== Personal life ==
He married, in 1909, the Honourable Mary Sydney Colebrooke, daughter of Edward Colebrooke, 1st Baron Colebrooke. They had two daughters:

- Penelope Mary Packe who married, as his second wife, John Drury Boteler Packe-Drury-Lowe (1905–1960) in 1936 and assumed as additional surname Packe and had issue Simon Jasper Packe-Drury-Lowe (born 1938).
- Ursula Sybil Packe who married first in 1934 Peter Clifton of Clifton Hall Clifton, Nottinghamshire and divorced. She married secondly Lord David Crichton-Stuart later Stuart (1911–1970) son of 4th Marquess of Bute and had issue.

Packe lived at Prestwold Hall, Prestwold, near Loughborough, Leicestershire, which had been purchased by his ancestor Lord Mayor of London Sir Christopher Packe. He died at Prestwold Hall in 1946.
