= Henry Handley =

British Whig politician (1797–1846)

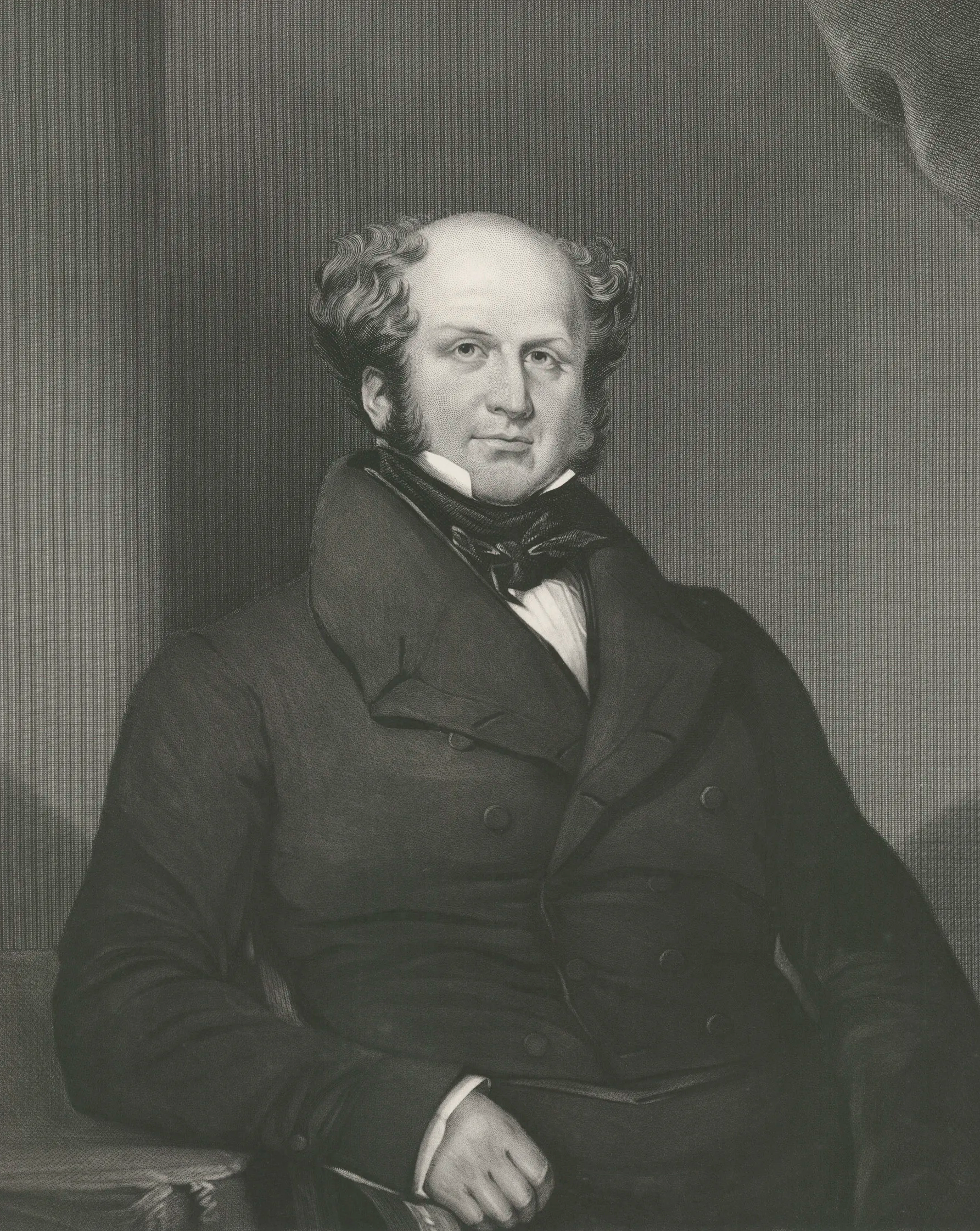
- Mezzotint after a portrait by William Beetham, after 1834

Member of Parliament for South Lincolnshire
- In office 17 December 1832 – 7 July 1841 Serving with Gilbert Heathcote
- Preceded by: New constituency
- Succeeded by: Christopher Turnor; John Trollope

Member of Parliament for Heytesbury
- In office 3 August 1820 – 9 June 1826 Serving with Edward Henry à Court-Repington
- Preceded by: Edward Henry à Court-Repington; Charles Ashe à Court-Repington
- Succeeded by: Edward Henry à Court-Repington; Henry Stafford Northcote

Personal details
- Born: 17 March 1797
- Died: 29 June 1846 (aged 49)
- Party: Whig
- Spouse: Caroline Edwardes (m. 1825)
- Children: 11
- Parent(s): Benjamin Handley; Frances Conington
- Education: Christ Church, Oxford; Eton School; Charterhouse School

Henry Handley (17 March 1797 – 29 June 1846) was a British Whig politician.

Handley was the third, but first surviving, son of Benjamin Handley, an attorney and banker, and his wife Frances née Conington. He began his education at Charterhouse School in 1805, before moving to Eton College in 1822, and then matriculating at Christ Church, Oxford in 1815. In 1816, he then entered Lincoln's Inn. In 1825, he married Caroline Edwardes, daughter of William Edwardes, 2nd Baron Kensington, and they had two sons, and eight daughters, while another illegitimate child is also recorded for Handley. He inherited his father's estate in 1828.

Handley was elected a Whig MP for Heytesbury at a by-election in 1820 and held the seat until 1826, when he was not re-elected. Around this time, he and his family lived in Culverthorpe Hall, five miles from Sleaford, which Henry was renting. The year after his marriage Handley left parliament and became a gentleman farmer at Culverthorpe.

In 1832, at the request of local freeholders, he was elected again to parliament, this time representing the new constituency (along with Gilbert Heathcote) and a member of the Whig party. Handley received local praise for his parliamentary action and was again elected in 1835 and 1837.

During the early 1830s Handley was a proponent of steam power; both in relation to agriculture and the railways. In 1829 he had offered a prize to anyone able to create a successful steam plough. In 1835 he helped revive Nicholas Cundy's proposal for a "Grand Northern Railway", running between London and York. As well as forming a company for the project, Northern and Eastern, Handley obtained the services of engineer James Walker to survey the proposed route. In 1836 various proposals for such lines were considered by parliament; the Northern and Eastern line was approved, but only as far as Cambridge (George Stephenson had convinced parliament that a Northern line via Derby was sufficient).

Handley's support of the Whig government in an 1840 vote of no confidence caused a falling out with his party and he decided not to stand in the 1841 general election. Nevertheless, his candidacy was proposed and seconded, although he was not re-elected. A year after leaving parliament for the second time Handley became president of the recently formed Royal Agricultural Society; he had been one of 12 trustees during the society's formation in 1838/39.

Handley died on 29 June 1846 at Surrenden-Dering, Kent, he is buried at Pluckley. The following year Sleaford townspeople began raising a subscription to construct a memorial in the town, eventually obtaining £942. Construction on the "Handley Testimonial in Sleaford" (now known as "Handley's monument"), designed by William Boyle, began in 1850 and was completed in 1852. A street was later named after him.

Parliament of the United Kingdom
Preceded by Edward Henry à Court-Repington; Charles Ashe à Court-Repington	Member of Parliament for Heytesbury; 1820–1826; With: Edward Henry à Court-Repington	Succeeded by Edward Henry à Court-Repington; Henry Stafford Northcote
New constituency	Member of Parliament for South Lincolnshire; 1832–1841; With: Gilbert Heathcote	Succeeded by Christopher Turnor; John Trollope
