= Walton on the Wolds =

Village in Leicestershire, England

Coordinates: 52.7725°N 1.122917°W

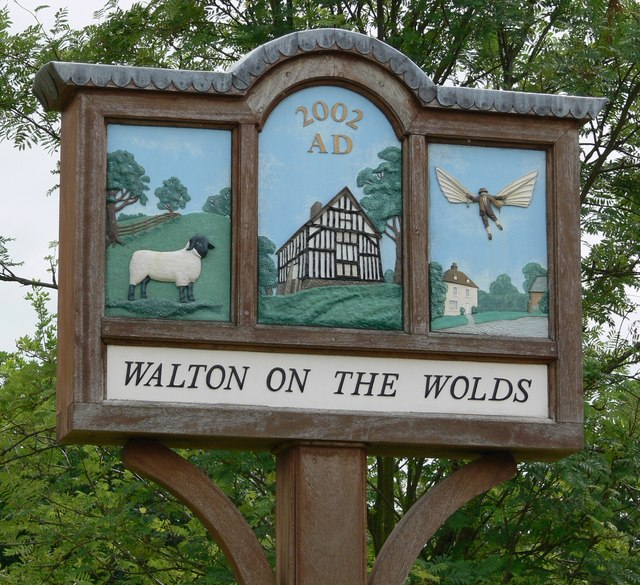
- Village sign

- Location within Leicestershire
- Population: 288
- Civil parish: Walton on the Wolds
- Shire county: Leicestershire
- Region: East Midlands
- Country: England
- Sovereign state: United Kingdom
- Post town: Loughborough
- Postcode district: LE12
- Dialling code: 01509
- Police: Leicestershire
- Fire: Leicestershire
- Ambulance: East Midlands
- UK Parliament: Loughborough

Walton on the Wolds is a village and civil parish in the Charnwood district of Leicestershire, England. In the 2011 United Kingdom census the parish had a population of 288. It is near to Burton on the Wolds and Barrow upon Soar. It was the location of one series of Boon, starring Michael Elphick and Neil Morrissey. The series used the Tudor house, Kings Cote, as Boon's house.

The name Walton is derived from the settlement or farmstead of Wealas - native Celts, which is what the new Anglo Saxon speaking peoples called the native inhabitants of England.

The village has an Anglican church called St Mary's.
