= Christopher Packe (politician) =

English merchant and politician (1593–1682)

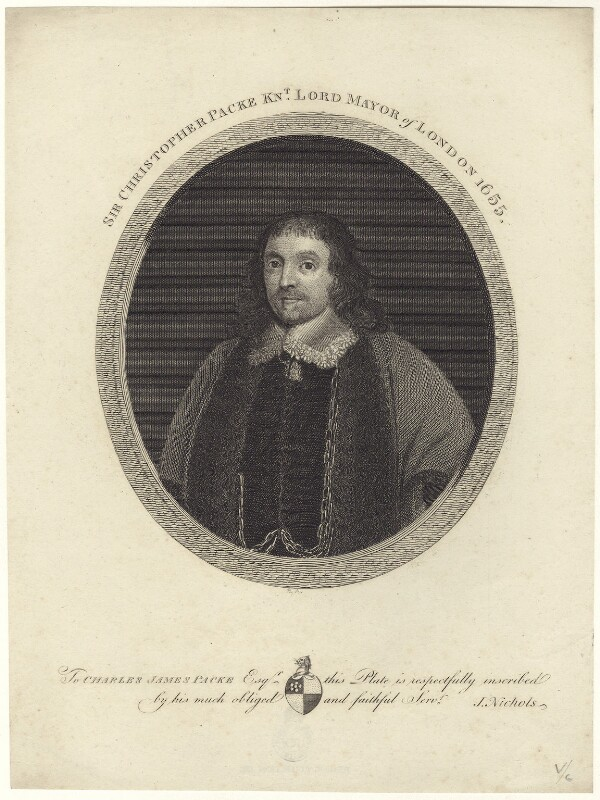
A 1795 engraving of Packe by James Basire.

Sir Christopher Packe (c. 1593 – 27 May 1682) was an English merchant and politician who served as the Lord Mayor of London in 1654. Born in Northamptonshire, he subsequently moved to London and became a member of the Worshipful Company of Drapers and the Company of Merchant Adventurers of London. In 1655, Packe was knighted and appointed as an commissioner of the Admiralty. A strong ally of Oliver Cromwell, he proposed on 23 February 1656 in the Second Protectorate Parliament the Humble Petition and Advice, which unsuccessfully attempted to persuade Cromwell to crown himself. After the Stuart Restoration, Packe was barred from holding public office and died in 1682.

== Early life ==
Christopher Packe was born c. 1593, the son of Thomas Packe of Kettering or Grafton, Northamptonshire, and Catherine his wife. He seems to have been apprenticed at an early age to John Kendrick, who died in 1624 and left him a legacy of £100. Packe married a kinswoman of Kendrick, set himself up in business in the woollen trade, and soon amassed a large fortune. He was an influential member of the Drapers' Company, of which he became a freeman, and he served the office of master in 1648. On 9 October 1646, by an ordinance of parliament, he was appointed a trustee for applying the bishops' lands to the use of the Commonwealth.

== Political career ==
His connection with municipal affairs began on 4 October 1647, when he was elected alderman of Cripplegate ward. On midsummer day 1649 he was chosen as one of the sheriffs of London and Middlesex, and on 2 October following was elected alderman of Cornhill, but declined to desert Cripplegate ward. His wealth, ability, and zeal for the parliamentary cause soon brought him extensive public employment.

In 1649, and perhaps earlier, he was one of the commissioners of customs. He was also a prominent member, and subsequently governor, of the Company of Merchant Adventurers, and probably on this account was frequently appointed, with other aldermen, to advise the council in commercial controversies. According to Thomas Burton's 'Diary' (1828, i. 308–10), Packe fought hard at the meeting of the committee of trade on 6 January 1656 – 1657 for the monopoly of the Merchants Adventurers (of which he was then governor) in the woollen trade. The committee, however, decided against him.

In 1654 he was one of the treasurers (with Alderman Vyner) of the fund collected for the relief of the Protestants in Piedmont. This involved him in considerable trouble. The money was kept back for several years; various instructions were given him by the council for its disposal, and nearly £8,000 of the amount was lent by the treasurers to public bodies. Ultimately the matter came before the House of Commons, which resolved, on 11 May 1660, that the money should be paid to the treasurers by £2,000 monthly from the excise, the house also "declaring" detestation of any diversion of the money. Packe was also one of the city militia, and treasurer at Avar, receiving in the latter capacity threepence in the pound on all contributions received or paid by him.

Packe became Lord Mayor of London on 29 October 1654, and on 26 March 1655 the Protector, on the advice of the Council of State, thanked him and the rest of the militia commissioners of London "for their forwardness in execution of their trust". He received orders from the Council on 3 July to prevent a meeting taking place "in the new meeting-house at Paul's" at which one John Biddle was to argue against the divinity of Jesus Christ. The council also appointed him one of the committee of trade on 12 July, and he was knighted by Oliver Cromwell at Whitehall on 20 September. On 31 October he was made an admiralty commissioner. Packe was also chosen with others on 15 November 1650 to meet the committee of council appointed to consider the proposals of Manasseh Ben-Israel on behalf of the Jews. On 25 March 1656 he was appointed one of the commissioners for securing peace in the city of London. In the following August Packe was presented by the hackney coachmen with a piece of plate to support them in keeping out the parliamentary soldiers who were then seeking civil employment as coachmen among other jobs. The sum of £16,000 was still due to the state from Packe and his fellow commissioners of customs, and, after several petitions and inquiries by the treasury, Packe and two others were discharged from a share in the obligation, but Alderman Avery and Richard Bateman were not acquitted. In September 1657 Packe appears as one of the committee of Parliament for farming the customs, and on 25 March he was made, with Sir Thomas Vyner, treasurer of the fund for the relief of Protestant exiles from Poland and Bohemia. In January 1655-6 Cromwell and his council proposed to send Packe, with Whitelocke, on an extraordinary embassy to the king of Sweden, so as "to manifest the engagement of the city in this business, and in it to put an honour upon them".

Packe was a representative of the city in Cromwell's last parliament, summoned on 17 September 1656, and on 23 February 1657, although he was not the author, he brought forward his celebrated "remonstrance", afterwards called the "Humble Petition and Advice", desiring the Protector to assume the title of king, and to restore the House of Lords. Although was agreed to by the House of Commons, Cromwell turned down the offer to become king possibly due to the pressure placed upon him by republicans in the army and Parliament. Instead a modified Humble Petition and Advice was accepted with Cromwell keeping the title of Lord Protector and able to nominate his successor, the creation of a second parliamentary chamber and triennial parliaments.

Packe, with another city alderman, Robert Titchborne, was a member of the new House of Lords early in 1658. The new lords obtained no right of precedency over their brother aldermen. On 11 May Packe lent £4,000 to the state to pay the wages of the fleet lately returned into port.

On the Restoration Packe signed a declaration, 5 June 1660, together with the lord mayor, one of the sheriffs, and ten other aldermen, of "their acceptance of His Majesty's free and general pardon, engaging by God's assistance to continue His Majesty's loyal and obedient subjects". But he was included by the commons (13 June 1660) in a list of twenty persons who were to be excepted from the act of general pardon, and to suffer certain penalties, not extending to life, to be determined by a future act of parliament. This clause was thrown out by the Lords on 1 August; but on the next day they resolved that sixteen persons, among whom Packe was included, should be disqualified from holding in future any public office or employment under penalty of being excepted from the act of pardon. Packe was accordingly, with six other Commonwealth lord mayors, removed from the office of alderman, his last attendance at the court of aldermen being on 7 August 1660. His interest at court, however, nearly availed him to procure a baronetcy for Christopher, his younger son, a grant for which was issued on 29 March 1666; but, for some unknown cause, the title was not actually conferred.

Packe's city residence was in Basinghall Street, immediately adjoining Blackwell Hall, the headquarters of the woollen trade. He also had a suburban house at Mortlake. On 2 March 1649 – 1650 the lease of the manor of Prestwold in Leicestershire was assigned to him by the corporation, who held it in trust for the orphan children of John Acton. Shortly afterwards this manor, with the neighbouring one of Cotes, was assigned to him by Sir Henry Skipwith, the stepfather of these orphans.

== Later life ==
After his forced retirement from public office, he spent the remainder of his life at the mansion of Cotes. He also purchased on 19 January 1648 – 1649, for £8,1741. 16s. 6d., the manor of the bishops of Lincoln at Buckden in Huntingdonshire, which was for some time his occasional residence. Packe died on 27 May 1682, and was buried in Prestwold church, Leicestershire, where there is a fine monument to his memory on the north wall of the chancel. The Latin inscription states that he was about eighty-four years old at his death.

== Family ==
Packe married three times: first, to Jane, daughter of Thomas Newman of Newbury, merchant draper, by Ann, daughter of John Kendrick, who was mayor of Reading in 1565; secondly, to Anne, eldest daughter of Simon Edmonds, alderman of London; and thirdly, to Elizabeth (born Richards), widow of Alderman Herring. He had no issue by his first and third wives; but by his second wife, Anne, who died in 1657, he had two sons, Christopher and Simon, and three daughters, Anne, Mary, and Susanna. (Note: Welch 1895, p. 30 Notes: His portrait is engraved by Basire, and published by Nichols (History of Leicestershire, vol. iii. pt. i. pi. 50, p. 355), from an original painting by Cornelius Janssens, still in the possession of the family in the late 19th century. It represents Packe in his official robes as lord mayor, with laced band and tassels, and laced ruffles turned over the sleeve of his gown, his right hand resting on a table. (see also NPG & D29013))

Packe is an ancestor of Sir Arthur Conan Doyle on his mother's side.

The Packes bore for their arms argent, on a chief azure, three anchors or.

== See also ==
- George Hussey Packe
- Sir Edward Packe
- Prestwold
- Prestwold Hall
