= St Mary's Church, Walton on the Wolds =

St Mary's, Walton on the Wolds
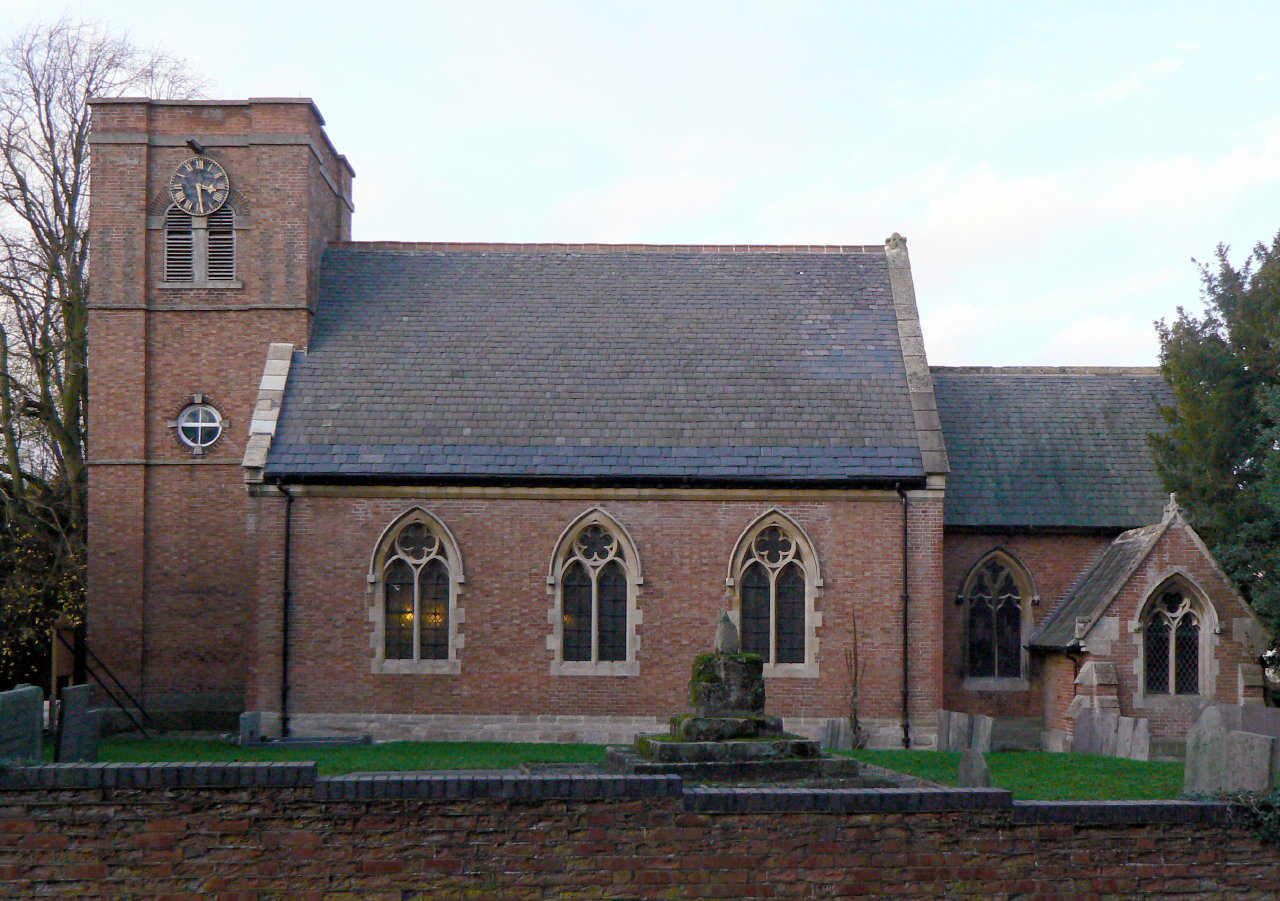
- St Mary's, Walton on the Wolds
- 52.7714°N 1.124°W
- OS grid reference: SK 59194 19666
- Location: Walton on the Wolds, Leicestershire
- Country: England
- Denomination: Anglican
- Website: www.barrowandwoldsgroup.com/st-marys-walton/

History
- Dedication: Saint Mary

Architecture
- Heritage designation: Grade II
- Designated: 15 March 1984

Administration
- Province: Canterbury
- Diocese: Leicester

St. Mary's is a Grade II parish church situated in the village of Walton on the Wolds in Leicestershire.

== Description ==
=== Current benefice ===
St Mary's is connected to the parish of Barrow on Soar. and is part of a wider group of churches described as the Barrow and Wolds Group. The church falls within the Loughborough Archdeaconry, and Akeley East Deanery. The legal name of the parish is Barrow upon Soar with Walton le Wolds.

The Barrow & Wolds Group also includes:

- Holy Trinity Church, Barrow upon Soar
- St Mary's Church, Wymeswold
- St Andrew's Church, Prestwold

=== Services ===
The church holds occasional services. Check website for details. AM

== Heritage ==
A church, dedicated to St Bartholomew, is believed to have been present in the village since at least 1220, however the church was rebuilt in 1736 and dedicated to St Mary. The current west tower has been dated back to this 18th century rebuild. The church experienced further rebuilding in the 19th century, including the nave and chancel, which had a Gothic influence. The church has been noted for its unusual use of red brick since rubblestone is more commonly used among churches in the locality. The heritage listing notes that the church has several stained glass windows.

== See also ==
Media related to St Mary's church, Walton on the Wolds at Wikimedia Commons
