= Wymeswold =

Village in Leicestershire, England

Coordinates: 52°48′18.50″N 1°6′22.00″W

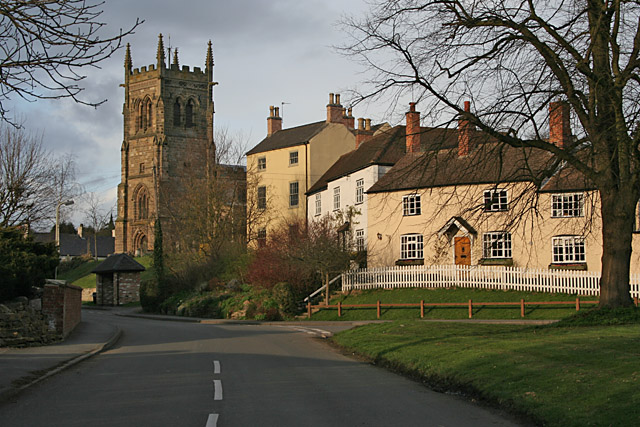

- Location within Leicestershire
- Population: 1,296
- District: Charnwood
- Shire county: Leicestershire
- Region: East Midlands
- Country: England
- Sovereign state: United Kingdom
- Post town: LOUGHBOROUGH
- Postcode district: LE12
- Dialling code: 01509
- Police: Leicestershire
- Fire: Leicestershire
- Ambulance: East Midlands
- UK Parliament: Loughborough

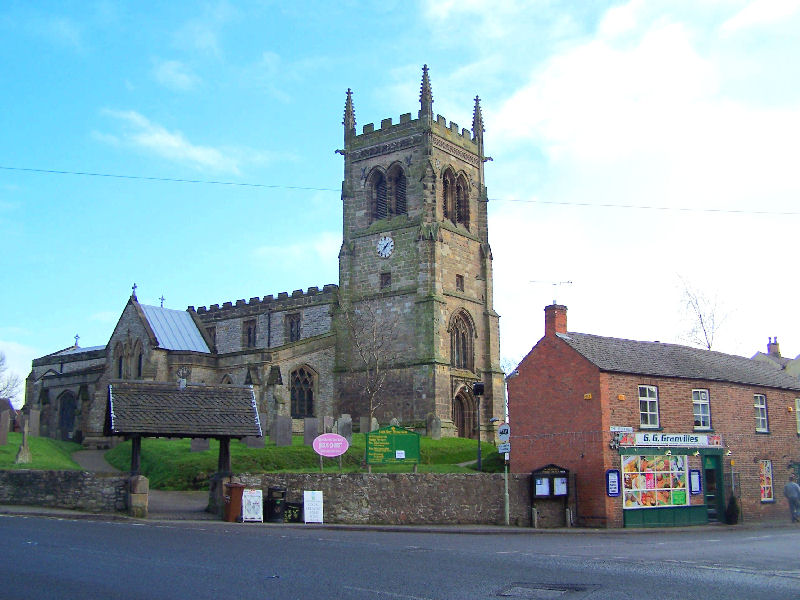
Wymeswold parish church

Wymeswold (/waɪmzwɒld/) is a village and civil parish in the Charnwood district of Leicestershire, England. It is in the north of Leicestershire, and north-east of Loughborough. The village has a population of about 1,000, measured at 1,296 in the 2011 census. It is close to Prestwold and Burton on the Wolds in Leicestershire, and the Nottinghamshire villages of Rempstone and Willoughby on the Wolds.

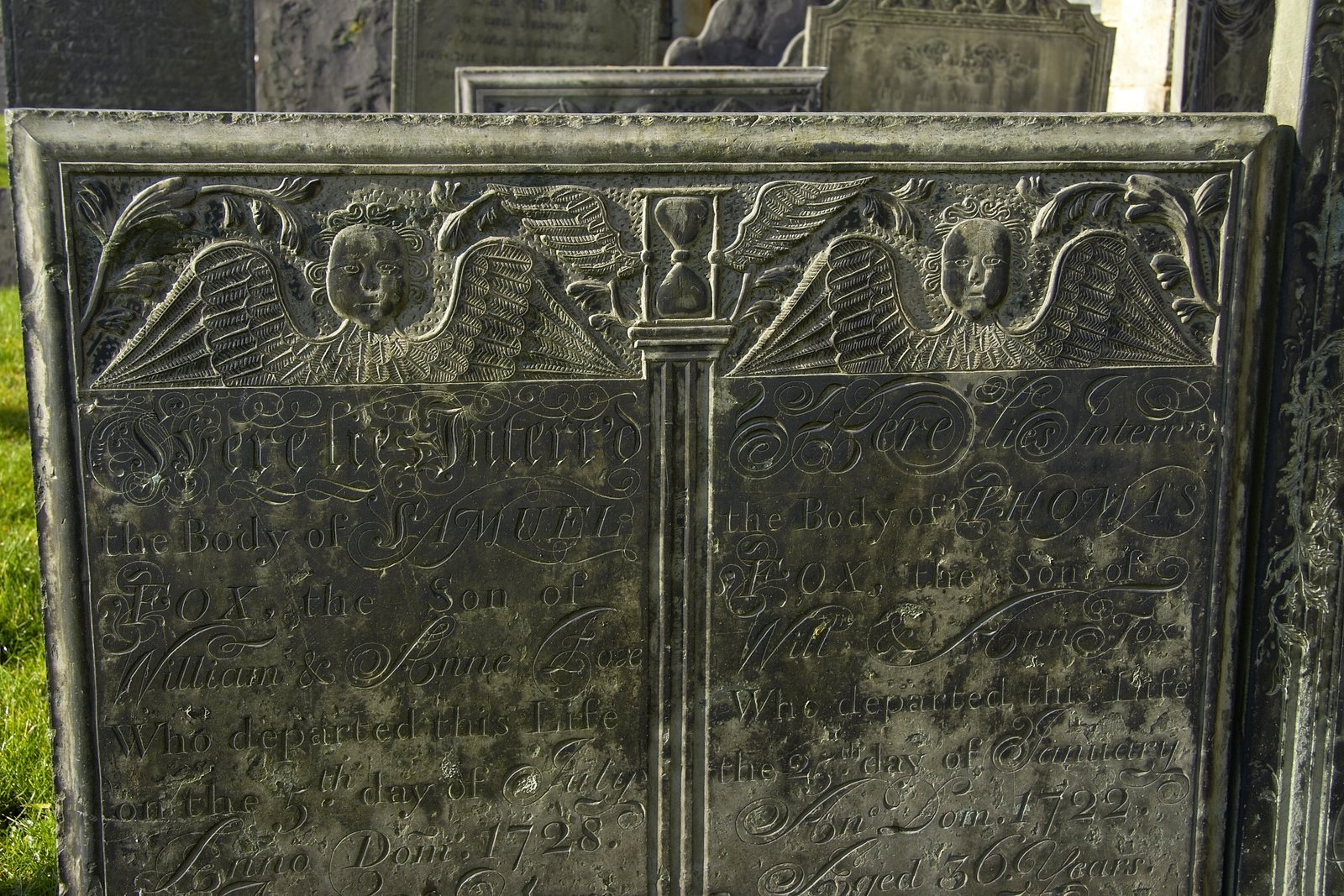
A William Charles gravestone in Wymeswold churchyard

== History and geography ==
There used to be a school in the village run by Thomas Potter in the nineteenth century on Elm Street. The school was moved to a site to the south of the village when it expanded in the 1970s. The village was formerly the site of RAF Wymeswold, a memorial to which can be seen on the wall of Wymeswold pharmacy remembers when a Wellington bomber on a night training exercise crashed up on a hill nearby, just two miles from the airfield, on 25 November 1943. Six crew members died at the scene and a seventh died of his injuries three days later; the trainee rear gunner was the sole survivor. The Wymeswold airstrip still remains, although disused, is now used as a track for performance car 'experience' days, although there is some local opposition to this because of the noise. The former airfield is also the home for Airbossworld Kitepark. In 1939 a YHA youth Hostel opened in Wymeswold and subsequently shut in 1946.

The village has a history of cheese making, particularly Stilton, with six dairies making it in the 1920s. More recently, it was planned to make the newly- invented Lymeswold cheese at Wymeswold Dairy in the 1980s, but in the event production switched to Somerset.

The village has a greengrocer and general store, specialised pine furniture and gift shop, two pubs (The Three Crowns and The Windmill) and a restaurant (Hammer and Pincers). The Three Crowns was CAMRA Loughborough and North Leicestershire 2010 Village Pub of the Year. The village holds two fund raising events in the summer— the Wymeswold Duck Race (mid May) and the Wymeswold Open Gardens (mid June). Wymeswold Running Club organises the 'Waddle', a 5-mile road race on closed roads, to take place on the same day as the Duck Race. The post office was closed in May 2008, as part of the Royal Mail's restructuring. An outreach service has been opened in The Three Crowns. At the southern edge of the village, the 'Washdyke' recreational area includes a community orchard.

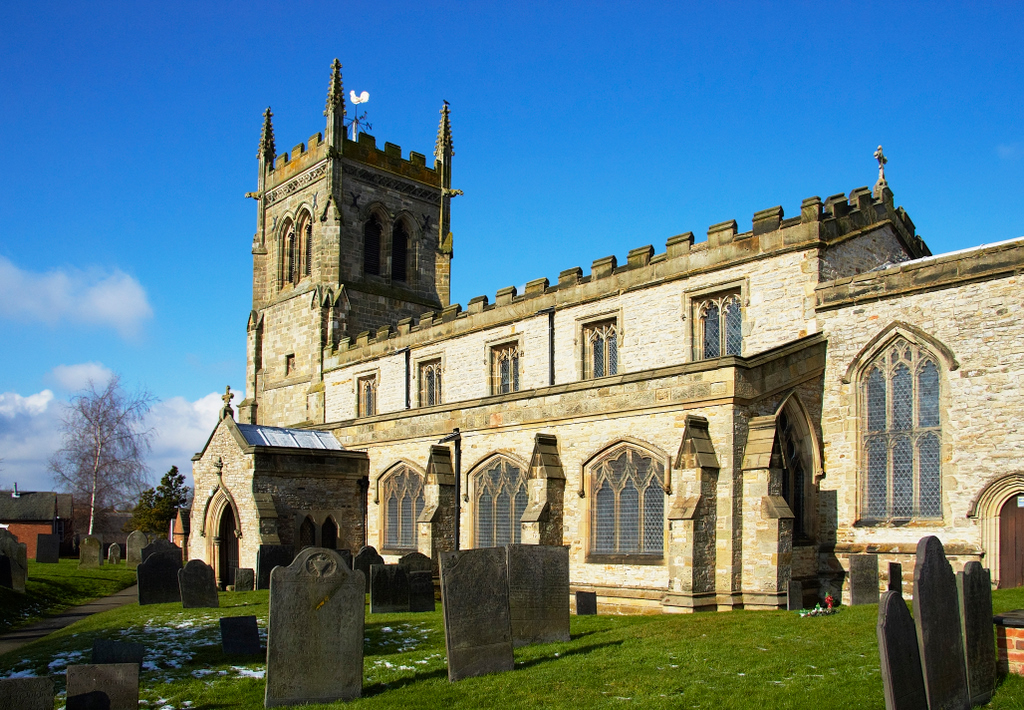
St Mary's Church

St Mary's church was restored in 1844 by A. W. N. Pugin. It contains the Leeke memorial to Judge William Leeke who was Lord of the Manor of Wymeswold in the mid-17th century. His widow presented the church with a silver flagon and paten that are now in the Charnwood museum. The remarkable windows were the work of John Hardman Studios, Birmingham. The churchyard contains one a noted collection of Swithland slate headstones . The village was a centre of Swithland slate carving and home to the fine slate craftsmen, William Charles, the Winfields and Roworth.

Henry Alford was the Vicar of Wymeswold from 1835 to 1853 and wrote many of his hymns here.
