= Prestwold Hall =

Country house in Prestwold, Leicestershire, England

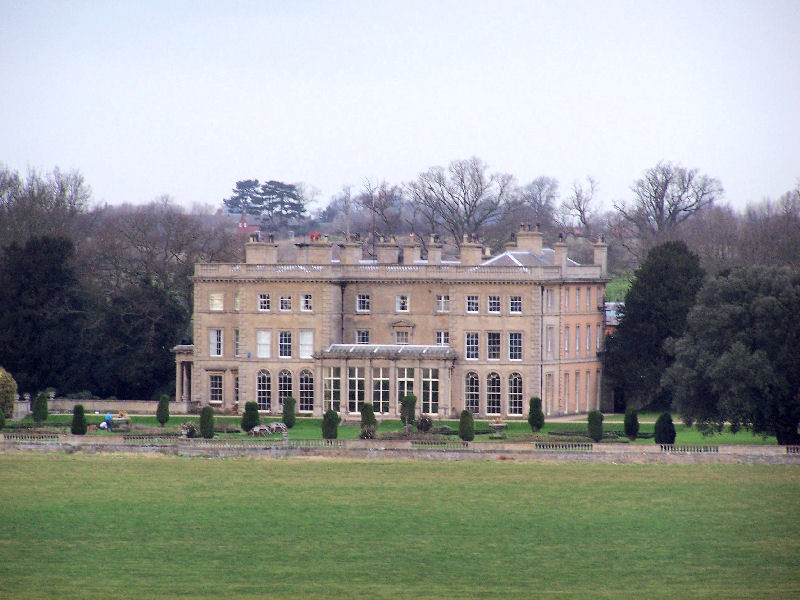
View of Prestwold Hall from the grounds.

Prestwold Hall is a country house in Leicestershire, England, standing in 2,500 acres (10 km^{2}) of land in the parish of Prestwold. It is both a private home and a venue for weddings and events.

== History ==
Prestwold Hall was, for many years, the seat of the Packe family. Before that time, it was the home of the Skipwith family. After the death of Major Robert Christopher Packe (born c.1783) - one time Aide-de-camp to King George III - who was killed during the Battle of Waterloo, the hall passed to his nephew George Hussey Packe who held the hall and estate until his death in 1874.

== The Packe Family ==
Prestwold Hall has been the seat of the Packe family for over 360 years since it was acquired by Sir Christopher Packe (1595 – 1682) in 1649, shortly after the death of Charles I. He was nominated by Oliver Cromwell to be one of the sixty who were to create an Upper House, and he introduced the Humble Petition and Advice to Parliament, being an offer of hereditary monarchy to Cromwell. This was the apex of his rise to fame and fortune. The Restoration came, however, and it was remembered that Christopher, ‘Lord Packe,’ late Lord Mayor of London, had been one of the aldermen who proclaimed the abolition of the monarchy in May 1649. Regicides had been among his intimate friends. In August 1660, Packe was disqualified from holding any public office, and retired to Prestwold, where he lived to the age of 87.

In the 1760s, Charles James Packe (1726 – 1816) rebuilt the Hall, and soon after created the park around it. Standing on the northern part of the East Lawn runs a line of cedars, already in 1780 said to be of notable size. Five years after Charles William Packe (1792 – 1867) inherited Prestwold in 1837, the house was largely remodelled by the defining Scottish architect William Burn. One of his earliest English commissions, it is one of the finest examples of a William Burn house in the neoclassical style. The interior of the house is noted for its exceptional marbled plaster work in the Italian style, remarkable for both the scale and the quality of the work. Within the house, there is a notable collection of twentieth century portraiture and of eighteenth century English and European furniture. Prestwold Hall passed to the Drury-Lowe family in 1936 when Penelope Mary, the daughter of Sir Edward Hussey Packe, married John Drury Boteler Drury-Lowe (1905-1960). Drury-Lowe adopted the additional surname of Packe – his son, Simon Jasper Packe-Drury-Lowe (1938-2015) inherited the house and estate either at the death of his father in 1960, or at the death of his mother in 1981.

Prestwold Hall remains to this day the home of the Packe-Drury-Lowe family.

== The Hall ==
The Hall was remodelled by architect William Burn in 1842–1844, incorporating the fabric of a mid-18th-century H-plan house. It was Grade I listed in 1951.

One of the finest rooms inside the house is the Entrance Hall with its richly coloured marbled plaster work in the Italian style. The painted ceiling was inspired by Raphael’s Vatican grotesques and incorporates miniature landscapes, showing the house before and after its remodelling between 1842 and 1844. Below the ceiling, wreathing the room, are small medallion busts of the poets from Chaucer to Scott, positioned in the spandrels and are likely inspired by Alberti's external arcade at the Tempio Malatestiano in Rimini. An arcade opens on to a vaulted corridor leading to a top lit inner hall: these spaces also marbled. Off the corridor, the cantilevered stone staircase survives from the eighteenth century house, and was given its bracketed brass balusters by William Wilkins (1751-1815) in 1805.

The Dining Room, added by Wilkins in 1805, was incorporated into the remodelling undertaken by the Scottish architect William Burn in 1842. The room is overlooked by two dramatic full length portraits of Sir Edward Hussey Packe, KBE (1878 – 1946) and the Hon. Lady Mary Sydney Packe (née Colebrooke, 1890 – 1973) by the painter Glyn Philpot RA (1844 – 1947). The portrait of Lady Packe, painted in 1911, was described by the art historian Robin Gibson OBE as an ‘amazing feat of virtuosity’. Its elongated elegance and introspective characterisation is totally without the fashion-plate vulgarity of much Edwardian portraiture. Other portraits hang in this room of the Packe family including a painting of Sir Christopher Packe (1595 – 1682) who purchased the house in the 17th century painted by Cornelis Janssens van Ceulen (1593 –1661).

The library extends nearly the entire length of the house when the large doors that separate it from the drawing room are opened, connecting the two rooms. With clever use of constructional steel, William Burn was able to create these long adjoining rooms. The windows rise from floor level and open onto the garden which enhances the notion that Prestwold was designed in the style of an Italian classical villa. The doors and bookcases in library were made for George Hussey Packe (1846–1908) by Gillows of Lancaster and London in 1875.

A conservatory fills the recessed central bay at the front of the house, and projects out towards the garden. Behind the glass and Doric pilasters, are raised beds with a number of exotic plants and flowers.

Before Burn's reworking of the gardens in 1842 the house was set on an informal lawn with shrubberies and trees to north, east and west, and with the main entrance to the south. This arrangement was probably established when Charles James Packe (1726 – 1816) had the park laid out c 1770. The author and antiquary, John Nichols, commended Charles James Packe's ‘extensive planting’ which, ‘bosomed [the house] in calm serenity’. During the restyling of the house Burn added the porte cochère and entrance to the west and created the garden that now lies to the south, with its well planted beds reflecting the classical symmetry of the house. The garden runs to a stone-balustraded parapet with views south onto the park. The parapet continues east to define the boundaries of the East Lawn, which extends for 100 yards east of the house with a grass terrace and a line of cedars, already in 1780 said to be of 'notable' size.

From the house are views south, across the gently rising parkland. In the 1760s Charles James Packe, rebuilt the Hall and soon after created the park around it. As John Nichols writes in The History and Antiquities of the County of Leicester, Volume III, Part I, published in 1800:

‘The grounds before [the house] are spacious, and possess much of a park-like appearance; and the house, in every point of view shews itself delightfully shaded with wood, being ornamented with large plantations of forest-trees; Mr Packe having, perhaps, planted and raised within the last thirty years, more trees than any gentleman in this county.’

Near the house stands the Grade II* listed church of St Andrew, a medieval parish church largely rebuilt in 1890 by the architect Sir A Blomfield. It is all that remains of the medieval village of Prestwold, which was demolished during the enclosure of the estate.

== The Estate ==
The Prestwold Estate extends over 1000 hectares of farmland and includes Wymeswold Airfield.

Wymeswold Airfield has one of the longest runways in the county, second to the East Midlands International Airport. The airfield was used during The Second World War for training bomber pilots. Wellington bombers, which were operated from the airfield, are very large planes without a great deal of propulsion, hence the requirement for 2000 yards of tarmac. Today, the airfield's primary use is for motor sports, on the purpose-built motor circuit that snakes around the airfield.

A number of events are held on the Estate through the year, ranging from festivals to Cross Country Championships.

== Renewable Energy ==
Much in the tradition of the Victorian stately home, modern technology still plays a part in the running of the house today. Electricity for the house is provided by two rows, 100 yards long, of photovoltaic panels in the walled garden producing 50 kW of power. The heating for the house is supplied by a biomass boiler situated near the panels which provides hot water with a series of flow and return pipes to the house. This means the house is lit and heated efficiently and predominantly from renewable energy sources.

The photovoltaic cells positioned on 150 acres (61 ha) of land at Wymeswold Airfield form one of the largest solar farms in Europe and upon its completion Wymsewold Solar Farm was the largest in the United Kingdom. The panels were connected to the National Grid in 2013 and the 130,000 panels produce enough energy to power approximately 7,500 homes. The cells are expected to produce emission-free energy for the next 25 years.
