= Charles Ashe à Court-Repington =

British Army officer and politician

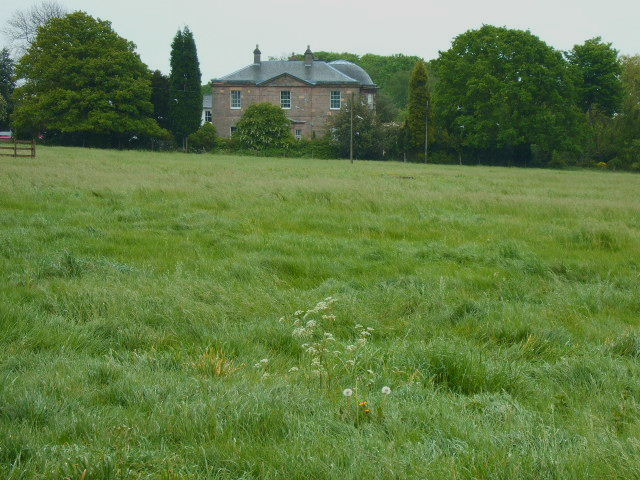
Amington Hall

General Charles Ashe à Court-Repington CB KH (17 June 1785 – 19 April 1861), born Charles Ashe à Court, was a senior British Army commander and politician.

He was the third son of Sir William Ashe à Court, 1st Baronet of Heytesbury, Wiltshire and educated at Eton College.

He joined the army as an ensign in 1801 and progressed through the ranks to Lieutenant-general in 1851. After the death of his father in 1817 he and his brother were returned to Parliament in 1820 to represent Heytesbury but he resigned his seat after a few months.

While serving as a major in the 1st Greek Light Infantry, Charles was appointed a Companion of the Order of the Bath on the occasion of King William IV's Coronation Honours.

He was given the colonelcy of the 41st (Welsh) Regiment of Foot in 1848, which he held until his death in 1861 and was promoted full general on 20 February 1856. He succeeded his brother Edward Henry to Amington Hall, Warwickshire in 1855 and took additional name of Repington by royal licence to comply with the will of his cousin, Charles Edward Repington of Amington.

He had married, in Palermo, Sicily, Mary Elizabeth Catherine, the daughter and heiress of Abraham Gibbs, merchant, of Naples and Palermo. They had a son and a daughter. His son Charles Henry Wyndham A'Court (1819–1903) was MP for Wilton. His daughter, Mary Elizabeth (1822–1911), was an author, painter and philanthropist, and married Sidney Herbert, later 1st Baron Herbert of Lea.

== See also ==
- List of British Army full generals

Parliament of the United Kingdom
Preceded by William Henry John Scott; George Agar-Ellis	Member of Parliament for Heytesbury; March – August 1820; With: Edward Henry A'Court	Succeeded by Henry Handley; Edward Henry A'Court
