= Lymeswold cheese =

English cheese

- Country of origin: England
- Source of milk: Cows
- Pasteurised: Yes
- Texture: Soft
- Aging time: 4 weeks
- Certification: None

Lymeswold cheese (1982–1992) was an English cheese variety. Although many English cheeses are named after regions, Lymeswold's name was the result of a public competition to name it; the winning name may have been derived from an English place name Wymeswold. The cheese was a soft, mild blue cheese with an edible white rind, much like Brie, and was inspired by French cheeses. It was similar to non-branded cheeses sold as Blue Brie. At the time of its launch, it was hailed as "the first new English cheese in 200 years". For the export market, the cheese was branded Westminster Blue, because some non-English speakers had difficulty pronouncing the name Lymeswold. It was also called Slymeswold.

== Origins ==
In 1979 the Milk Marketing Board began discussions with the large dairy firm Unigate that led in 1981 to the restructuring of its processing and marketing activities under the Dairy Crest brand to use surplus milk production for making other dairy products. The initiatives that followed included the launch in 1982 of Lymeswold cheese. The name was derived from public competition to name the new cheese. The cheese was to be called Wymeswold, but was changed.

It was developed in the research centre of the Crudgington creamery, in Shropshire, by Michael Shaw of Madeley and Terry Oftedal of Wrexham.

It is claimed that it was originally planned to produce the cheese at Wymeswold in Leicestershire, but eventually it was first produced at Cannington creamery in Somerset. The cheese's creation was hailed by Peter Walker, then Agriculture Minister, who said it would improve the balance of payments by replacing imports and becoming "one of our most successful cheese exports".

== Rise and fall ==
The concept of Lymeswold was created by an advertising agency, Butler Dennis & Garland, in response to a brief from the Milk Marketing Board to make use of more milk. It was conceived after a review of upcoming types, where soft blue cheese seemed to be missing from the UK's indigenous repertoire. The village of Lymeswold was created as part of the brand idea. With heavy promotion and a very successful branding exercise, initial demand for Lymeswold exceeded supply. It has been suggested that the Board then released maturing stocks before they were ready, which gave the cheese a reputation for poor quality. Certainly the initial success of the cheese did not turn into steady long-term sales. It was later subjected to strong competition from Cambozola, a German cheese, and eventually ceased production in 1992. Dairy Crest said at the time that it "could not sustain demand". John Withley, then the restaurant critic of the Daily Telegraph, welcomed the news with "unfettered joy", saying it had always been "an artificial cheese".

== Production ==
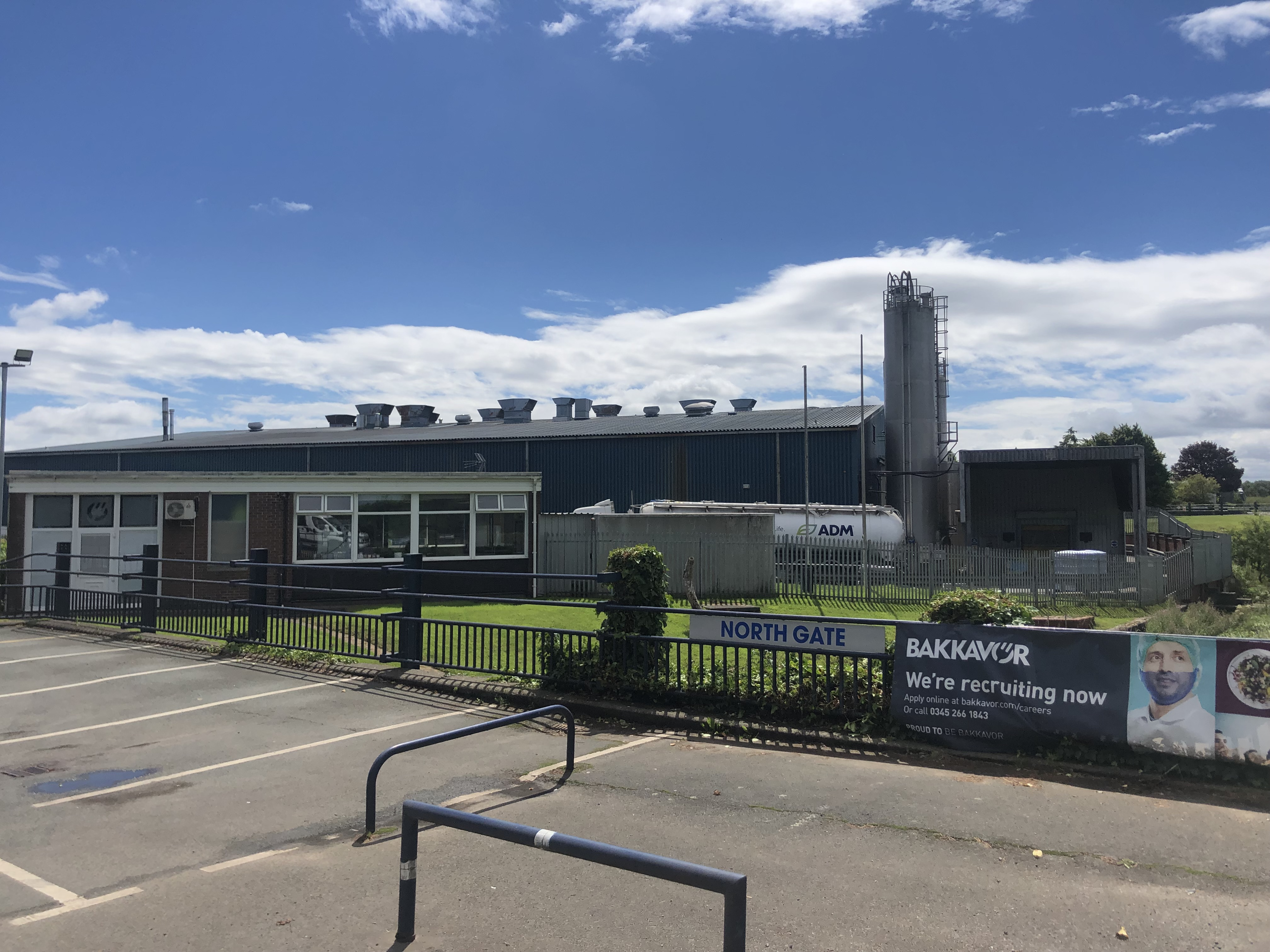
Bakkavör site in July 2022

The Cheshire site was built by IDC of Warwickshire, now BakerHicks. A variation of the cheese similar to Brie, called Melbury, was later made at Cannington.

The Aston factory manager was Richard Elmitt. The site at Aston by Wrenbury closed in May 1992. There were 38 employees.

From September 1993 the former Cheshire factory has made most garlic baguettes for British supermarkets, by New Primebake, later owned by Bakkavör from 2006.

== See also ==
- List of British cheeses
