= Trollope baronets =

Title in the Baronetage of England

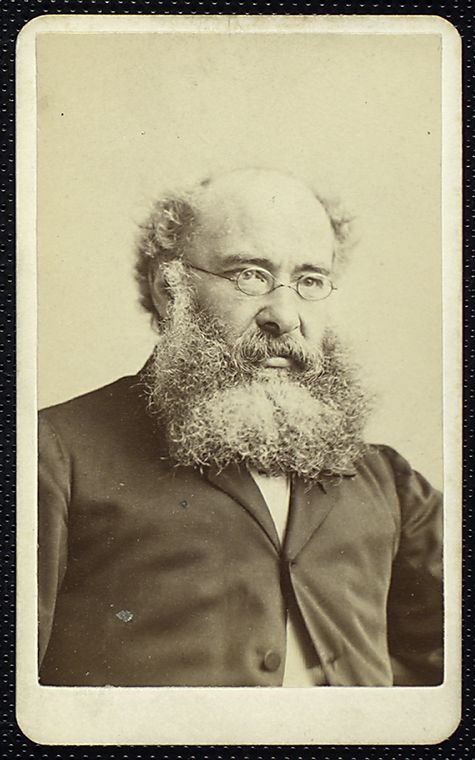
The author Anthony Trollope, a grandson of a younger son of the fourth Baronet and the ancestor of the fourteenth and subsequent Baronets.

The Trollope Baronetcy, of Casewick in the County of Lincoln, is a title in the Baronetage of England. It was created on 5 February 1642 for Thomas Trollope. The seventh Baronet was a Conservative politician. In 1868 he was raised to the Peerage of the United Kingdom as Baron Kesteven, of Casewick in the County of Lincoln. The barony became extinct in 1915 when the third Baron was killed in action in the First World War. The late Baron was succeeded in the baronetcy by his cousin, the tenth Baronet.

The author Anthony Trollope was the son of Thomas Anthony Trollope (1774–1835), the son of Reverend Anthony Trollope (1737–1806), younger son of the fourth Baronet. Since the 14th Baronet, all baronets have been descended from Anthony Trollope.

== Trollope baronets, of Casewick (1642) ==
- Sir Thomas Trollope, 1st Baronet (died c. 1654)
- Sir William Trollope, 2nd Baronet (3 January 1621 – 16 May 1678)
- Sir Thomas Trollope, 3rd Baronet (c. 1667 – 22 November 1729)
- Sir Thomas Trollope, 4th Baronet (21 December 1691 – 7 October 1784), ancestor of all later baronets and the author Anthony Trollope who was his great-grandson.
- Sir Thomas William Trollope, 5th Baronet (c. 1762 – 13 May 1789)
- Sir John Trollope, 6th Baronet (c. 1766 – 28 April 1820)
- Sir John Trollope, 7th Baronet (5 May 1800 – 17 December 1874) (created Baron Kesteven in 1868)

== Barons Kesteven (1868) ==
- John Trollope, 1st Baron Kesteven (5 May 1800 – 17 December 1874)
- John Henry Trollope, 2nd Baron Kesteven (22 September 1851 – 23 July 1915)
- Thomas Carew Trollope, 3rd Baron Kesteven (1 May 1891 – 5 November 1915)

The third Lord Kesteven succeeded to the barony on the death of his uncle in 1915. He had joined the Lincolnshire Yeomanry and was gazetted Captain in October 1914. He died at Oran, Algeria after receiving wounds on 3 November 1915 aboard SS Mercian which was shelled by U-Boat SM U-38 after leaving Gibraltar. He is now buried at Crowcombe, Somerset.

== Trollope baronets, of Casewick (1642; Reverted) ==
- Sir William Henry Trollope, 10th Baronet (14 September 1858 – 24 August 1921)
- Sir Thomas Ernest Trollope, 11th Baronet (14 September 1858 – 23 September 1927) who had two daughters; his granddaughter maternally was Diana Neave, Baroness Airey of Abingdon (died 1992).
- Sir Henry Cracroft Trollope, 12th Baronet (5 June 1860 – 29 May 1935)
- Sir Arthur Grant Trollope, 13th Baronet (10 June 1866 – 14 February 1937)
- Sir Frederic Ferrand Trollope, 14th Baronet (20 September 1875 – 9 November 1957), third son of Frederick James Anthony Trollope (1847–1910), himself younger son of the author Anthony Trollope. He died unmarried like his older brothers.
- Sir Gordon Clavering Trollope, 15th Baronet (29 October 1885 – 18 October 1958), brother of the above, 6th and youngest son of Frederick James Anthony Trollope (1847–1910), himself younger son of the author Anthony Trollope. Trollope was born in Sydney, Australia, and attended Newington College (1898–1901) He later worked as a woolbroker in Australia.
- Sir Anthony Owen Clavering Trollope, 16th Baronet (15 January 1917 – 1987), elder son of the 15th Baronet. Trollope was born in Sydney, Australia, and attended North Sydney Boys High School.
- Sir Anthony Simon Trollope, 17th Baronet (born 31 August 1945). Anthony Trollope was born in Sydney, Australia, and attended North Sydney Boys High. He is married, with two daughters. The heir presumptive is his younger brother Hugh.

The heir presumptive to the baronetcy is Hugh Irwin Trollope (born 31 March 1947), who is married with one son and two daughters. Hugh Trollope was born in Sydney, Australia, and attended North Sydney Boys High School. As a result of a family illness he became a boarder at Newington College (1964–1966), which his grandfather had attended. He was a notable Rugby Union player for Newington and Gordon Club.

The heir presumptive's heir apparent is Andrew Ian Trollope (born 5 July 1978). Andrew Trollope was born in Sydney, Australia, and attended Newington College (1988–1996).

Coat of arms of Trollope baronets
Crest On a mount Vert a stag courant as in the arms holding an oak leaf in his mouth Proper. Escutcheon Vert three stags courant Argent attired Or within a bordure of the second. Motto Audio Sed Taceo (I Hear But Am Silent)

== See also ==
- Duke of Ancaster and Kesteven
- The Baroness Thatcher, of Kesteven in the County of Lincolnshire

== Bibliography ==
- Kidd, Charles, Williamson, David (editors). Debrett's Peerage and Baronetage (1990 edition). New York: St Martin's Press, 1990.
- Leigh Rayment's list of baronets
