= Edward Henry à Court-Repington =

British politician and naval officer (1783-1855)

Vice-Admiral Edward Henry à Court-Repington

Member of Parliament for Tamworth
- In office 25 August 1837 – 28 July 1847 Serving with Robert Peel
- Preceded by: Robert Peel; William Yates Peel
- Succeeded by: Robert Peel; William Yates Peel

Member of Parliament for Heytesbury
- In office 8 March 1820 – 3 December 1832 Serving with George Staunton (1830–1832); Henry Stafford Northcote (1826–1830); Henry Handley (Aug. 1820–1826); Charles Ashe à Court (Mar. 1820–Aug. 1820)
- Preceded by: George Agar-Ellis; William Henry John Scott
- Succeeded by: Constituency abolished

Personal details
- Born: Edward Henry à Court; 10 December 1783
- Died: 22 September 1855 (aged 71)
- Party: Conservative/Tory
- Parent(s): Sir William à Court, 1st Baronet; Letitia Wyndham
- Relatives: Charles Ashe à Court-Repington (brother); William à Court-Holmes, 2nd Baron Heytesbury (brother)

Edward Henry à Court-Repington (10 December 1783 – 22 September 1855), known as Edward Henry à Court until 1847 and sometimes spelled A'Court or A'Court-Repington, was a British Conservative and Tory politician, and navy officer.

== Family and early life ==
Born as Edward Henry à Court, he was the son of Sir William à Court, 1st Baronet and Letitia, who was daughter of Henry Wyndham and sister to Henry Penruddocke Wyndham. À Court-Repington was also the brother of Charles Ashe à Court-Repington and William à Court, 1st Baron Heytesbury. While he never married, on 24 September 1847, by Royal Licence, he took the additional surname of Repington, in accordance with the will of his father's first cousin, Charles Edward Repington, who had gifted him £30,000 and Amington Hall in Tamworth, Staffordshire, upon his death in 1837.

== Naval career ==
After attending the Royal Naval Academy in Portsmouth in 1796, à Court-Repington began a long career in the Royal Navy, like his brother, Charles, serving in the Napoleonic Wars. He became a midshipman in 1800 and, on his first ship, served in the English Channel and off the coast of the Western Isles. In 1803, he commanded "a boat with only five hands", and succeeded in capturing a French schooner with a detachment of between 30 and 40 soldiers, alongside other passengers.

The following year, à Court-Repington was in joint command for a successful invasion force against Curaçao, and was promoted to lieutenant as a result. He was then in service for multiple occasions at the Jamaica station and Cape Cod. By 1808, he had been promoted to commander and, in 1811, to captain, first serving on HMS Owen Glendower in that year, and then of HMS Perseus from 1813 to 1815 in the Mediterranean and then off Newfoundland and Halifax.

Upon the death of his father in 1817, he received a legacy of £4,000, became a half-pay officer, and took up residence with his brother, Charles, at Heytesbury in Wiltshire, where they both began to handle estate business on behalf of their brother, William, who was then an envoy to Naples.

In 1841, he became a naval aide-de-camp to Queen Victoria, and then a rear admiral in 1847, and a vice admiral before retiring in 1854.

== Political career ==
=== Heytesbury MP ===
At this point, it is probable À Court-Repington became more involved in the electoral management of Heytesbury, which was by then fully under control of the family, although he deferred mainly to Charles. At the 1820 general election, alongside Charles, he was returned unopposed for Heytesbury as a Tory, and immediately became known as a member of the "ministerial phalanx".

In Parliament between 1820 and 1821, he voted against economies in revenue collection, and Catholic claims, and in defence of ministers' conduct towards Caroline of Brunswick. In the latter year, he vindicated the conduct of his brother, William, observing that "the reception which the reading of his mote with in the Neapolitan Parliament furnished a complete answer to the objections which had been urged" by Sir Robert Wilson, before voting against repeal of the additional malt duty, and against the disqualification of civil officers of the ordnance voting in parliamentary elections. At a committee meeting in 1821, where there was a scuffle between William Lowther, 1st Earl of Lonsdale and Marmaduke Wyvill, he was described by a Mrs Arbuthnot as having:

"jumped on the table and said, if they wished to fight, he was ready, that he had come into the House of Commons a few weeks before and had been glad to do so because he thought it would introduce him into a society of gentlemen, but that it had never before been his fate to be in company with such a set of blackguards, and that the sooner he got out of Parliament the better he should be pleased"

In 1822, he voted against the Catholic peers bill, and continued to resist extensive tax reductions to relieve distress. He divided against an inquiry into the right of voting in parliamentary elections, the abolition of tax on houses worth less than £5, and repeal of the Foreign Enlistment Act. In 1824, he also voted against reforming representation of Edinburgh and for an inquiry into the prosecution of Methodist missionary John Smith in Demarara. Again, in 1825, he voted against Catholic relief, and also the Irish franchise bill, before, on multiple occasions, approving the Duke of Cumberland's grant.

À Court-Repington was again returned unopposed for Heytesbury at the 1826, 1830 and 1831 general elections, within this period, continuing to vote against Catholic relief.

In 1828, it is believed he traveled to Russia with his brother, William, missing votes on Catholic emancipation. Indeed, Dorothea Lieven, wife of the Russian ambassador to London, Christoph von Lieven, told her brother Alexander von Benckendorff that "your Captain A'Court", a "charming man", "would not vote in the final division" in the Commons. No parliamentary activity for à Court-Repington is recorded in 1829.

When he returned in 1830, he voted against parliamentary reform, and against the enfranchisement of Birmingham, Leeds and Manchester. He also voted against radical reform and condemning the chancery administration. After that year's election, he was considered a "friend" of the ministry's and divided with them on the civil list, before taking a leave of absence for three weeks in December 1830, on account of "the disturbed state of his neighbourhood".

Due to his surname, à Court-Repington was the target of the Parliamentary Candidate Society pamphlet published in March 1831, which described him as a "High Tory: a very constant attendant in the House of Commons and a steadfast supporter of all ministers, expect the present", failing to support votes "in favour of the popular interest".

At the 1831 general election, à Court-Repington canvassed Wiltshire against pro-reform and unopposed sitting members. After the election, he voted against reform, for using the 1831 UK census to determine disfranchisement schedules, and to postpone discussions on whether to partially disfranchise Chippenham.

For the remainder of this period in parliament, he continued to vote against reform, but unsuccessfully opposed the disfranchisement of his own constituency, only stating it was not "my intention to offer any arguments against this motion, after the decision which the House has come to in the case of Downton. I shall, therefore, content myself with saying, that I oppose it."

=== Tamworth MP ===
At the 1832 general election, he did not seek election elsewhere, but in 1837, was returned as a Conservative Member of Parliament for Tamworth alongside Robert Peel. He held the seat until 1847, when he did not seek re-election.

Parliament of the United Kingdom
Preceded by George Agar-Ellis; William Henry John Scott	Member of Parliament for Heytesbury; 1820–1832; With: George Staunton (1830–1832); Henry Stafford Northcote (1826–1830); Henry Handley (Aug. 1820–1826); Charles Ashe à Court (Mar. 1820–Aug. 1820)	Constituency abolished
Preceded by Robert Peel; William Yates Peel	Member of Parliament for Tamworth; 1837–1847; With: Robert Peel	Succeeded by Robert Peel; William Yates Peel
