= Prestwold =

Hamlet in Leicestershire, England

Coordinates: 52.791°N 1.148°W

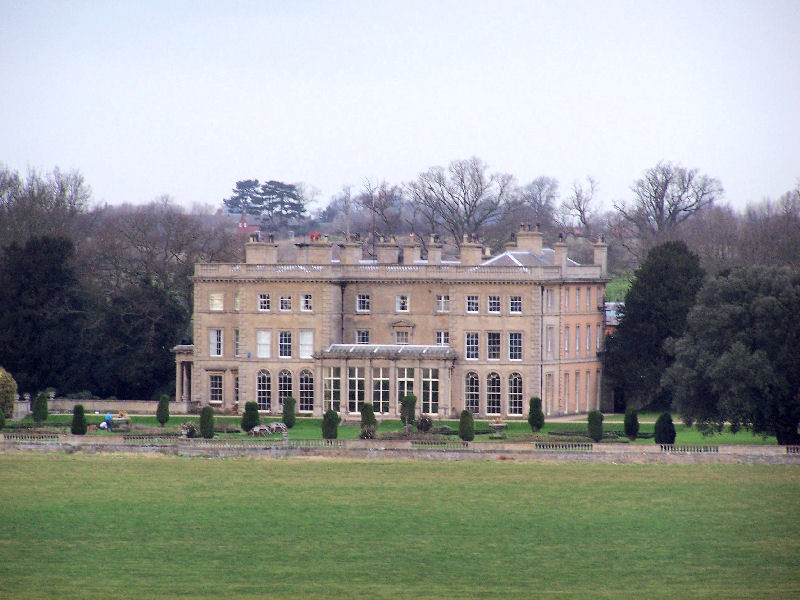
- Prestwold Hall

- Location within Leicestershire
- Civil parish: Prestwold
- District: Charnwood
- Shire county: Leicestershire
- Region: East Midlands
- Country: England
- Sovereign state: United Kingdom
- Post town: Loughborough
- Postcode district: LE12
- Police: Leicestershire
- Fire: Leicestershire
- Ambulance: East Midlands
- UK Parliament: Loughborough

Prestwold is a hamlet and civil parish in the Charnwood district of Leicestershire, England. The parish has a population of around 60. The population at the 2011 census remained less than 100 and is included in the civil parish of Hoton. Nearby places are Hoton, just to the north, and Burton on the Wolds, to the south-east.

The parish includes Prestwold Hall and parish church St Andrew's.

Prestwold has historical connection with the Packe family for generations after family founder Sir Christopher Packe.

== People from Prestwold ==
- Sir Edward Packe (1878–1946) – British Civil Servant, Deputy Lieutenant of Leicestershire and Justice of Peace.
- George Hussey Packe (1 May 1796 – 2 July 1874) – Member of Parliament, an army officer present at the Battle of Waterloo, and was instrumental in establishing the Great Northern Railway.
- Sir Christopher Packe (1593?–1682) – Lord Mayor of London; member of the Drapers Company; lord mayor, 1654; a prominent member of the Company of Merchant Adventurers; knighted and appointed an admiralty commissioner.
