= Gilbert Heathcote, 1st Baron Aveland =

British peer and politician

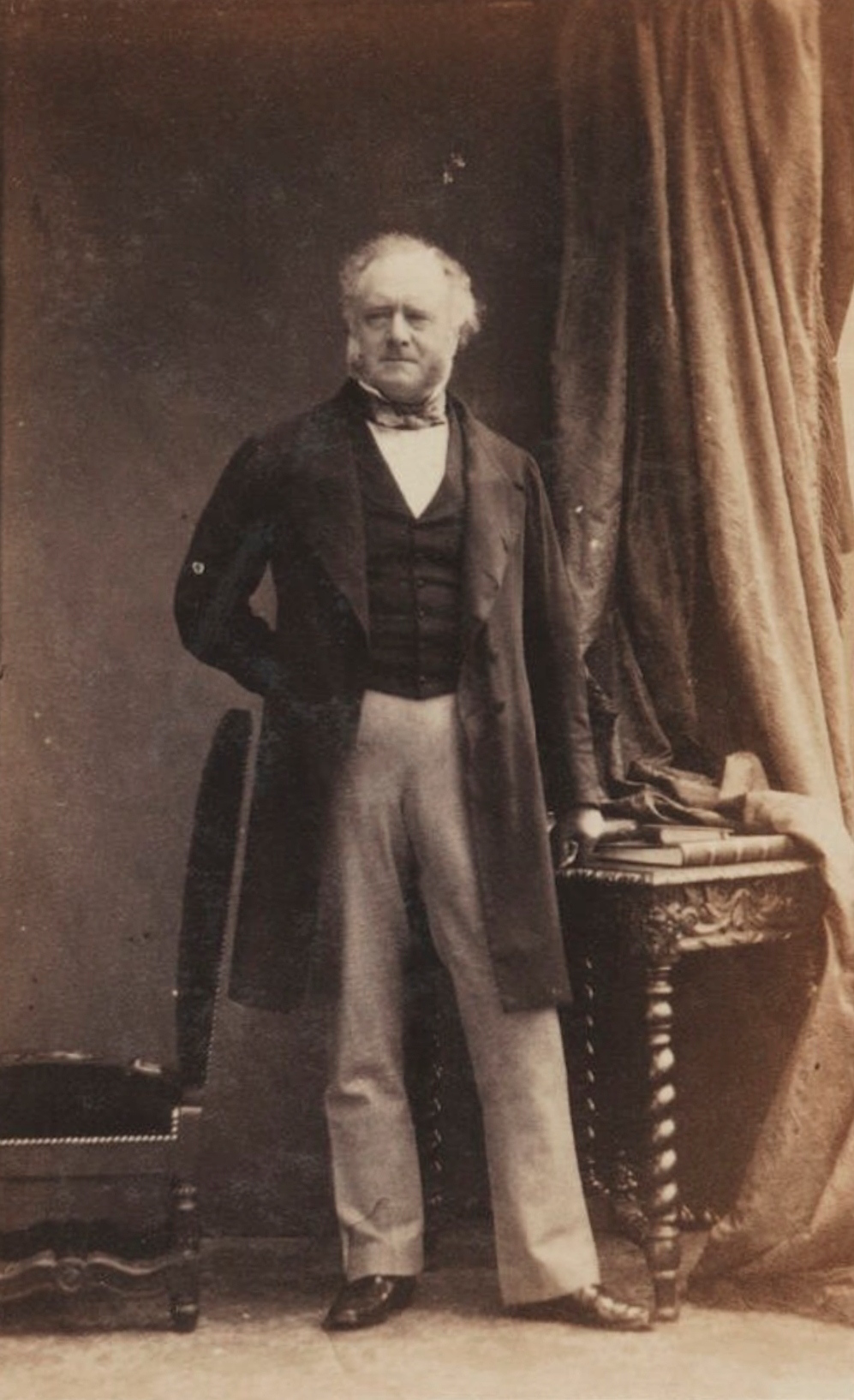
Gilbert John Heathcote, 1st Baron Aveland, 1860

Gilbert John Heathcote, 1st Baron Aveland (16 January 1795 – 6 September 1867), known as Sir Gilbert John Heathcote, 5th Baronet from 1851 to 1856, of Stocken Hall, Rutland, was a British peer and Whig politician.

== Background ==
Born at Normanton Hall, he was the eldest son of Sir Gilbert Heathcote, 4th Baronet and his first wife Katherine Sophia Manners, fourth daughter of John Manners. Heathcote was educated at Westminster School and Trinity College, Cambridge. In 1851, he succeeded his father as baronet and to his large estates in Rutland.

== Career ==
In 1820 he was elected to Parliament for Boston, a seat he held until 1830, and again from 1831 to 1832. He later represented Lincolnshire South from 1832 to 1841 and Rutland from 1841 to 1856. Olney describes him as "lukewarm in politics", with the "South Lincolnshire Liberals [finding] it hard to do anything with him, but equally hard to act without him." In 1856 Heathcote was raised to the peerage as Baron Aveland, of Aveland in the County of Lincoln. Having been previously a Deputy Lieutenant for Lancashire and Rutland, he later served as Lord Lieutenant of Lincolnshire from 1862 to 1867. As Lord Lieutenant his duties included the appointment, from advised candidates, of county magistrates, in which he was considered socially conservative being reluctant to appoint those not considered of suitable social standing, however respectable. In 1866 he expressed opposition to the 1867–passed Reform Act designed to widen franchise. Heathcote was appointed honorary colonel of the South Lincoln Militia in 1857.

== Family ==
He married Clementina Burrell-Drummond (the future 24th Baroness Willoughby de Eresby), eldest daughter of the 22nd Baron Willoughby de Eresby, in 1827. Heathcote died in September 1867, aged 72, and was succeeded by his son Gilbert Henry Heathcote-Drummond-Willoughby, who later also succeeded his mother in the barony of Willoughby de Eresby in 1888 and was created Earl of Ancaster in 1892.

Parliament of the United Kingdom
Preceded by William Alexander Madocks; Peter Drummond-Burrell	Member of Parliament for Boston; 1820–1830; With: Henry Ellis 1820–1821; William Augustus Johnson 1821–1826; Neil Malcolm 1826–1830	Succeeded by Neil Malcolm; John Wilks
Preceded by John Wilks; Neil Malcolm	Member of Parliament for Boston; 1831–1832; With: John Wilks	Succeeded by John Wilks; Benjamin Handley
New constituency	Member of Parliament for Lincolnshire South; 1832–1841; With: Henry Handley	Succeeded by Christopher Turnor; John Trollope
Preceded by Sir Gilbert Heathcote, Bt; Charles Noel	Member of Parliament for Rutland; 1841–1856; With: William Dawnay 1841–1846; George Finch 1846–1847; Gerard James Noel 1847–1856	Succeeded by Gerard Noel; Gilbert Heathcote
Honorary titles
Preceded by The Earl of Yarborough	Lord Lieutenant of Lincolnshire; 1862–1867	Succeeded by The Earl Brownlow
Peerage of the United Kingdom
New creation	Baron Aveland; 1856–1867	Succeeded by Gilbert Henry Heathcote-Drummond-Willoughby
Baronetage of Great Britain
Preceded by Gilbert Heathcote	Baronet (of London); 1851–1867	Succeeded by Gilbert Henry Heathcote-Drummond-Willoughby
