= Christopher Turnor (MP) =

English Conservative Party politician

Member of Parliament for South Lincolnshire
- In office April 1841 – 1847

Personal details
- Born: 4 April 1809
- Died: 7 March 1886 (aged 76)
- Party: Conservative
- Known for: Member of Parliament

Christopher Turnor MP, JP, DL (4 April 1809 – 7 March 1886), was an English Conservative Party politician who sat in the House of Commons from 1841 to 1847, and a promoter of Lincolnshire architecture.

Christopher Turnor was educated at Trinity College, Cambridge. He was a Deputy Lieutenant of Lincolnshire, a justice of the peace for parts of Kesteven and Lindsey in Lincolnshire, and High Sheriff of Lincolnshire in 1834. Turnor was elected as a Member of Parliament (MP) for South Lincolnshire in April 1841, and served until the 1847 general election. He was a member of the Carlton Club. Turnor had succeeded his father in 1829 when he was only 20-year-old, he inherited 20,664 acres and a rental income of £27,000 a year.

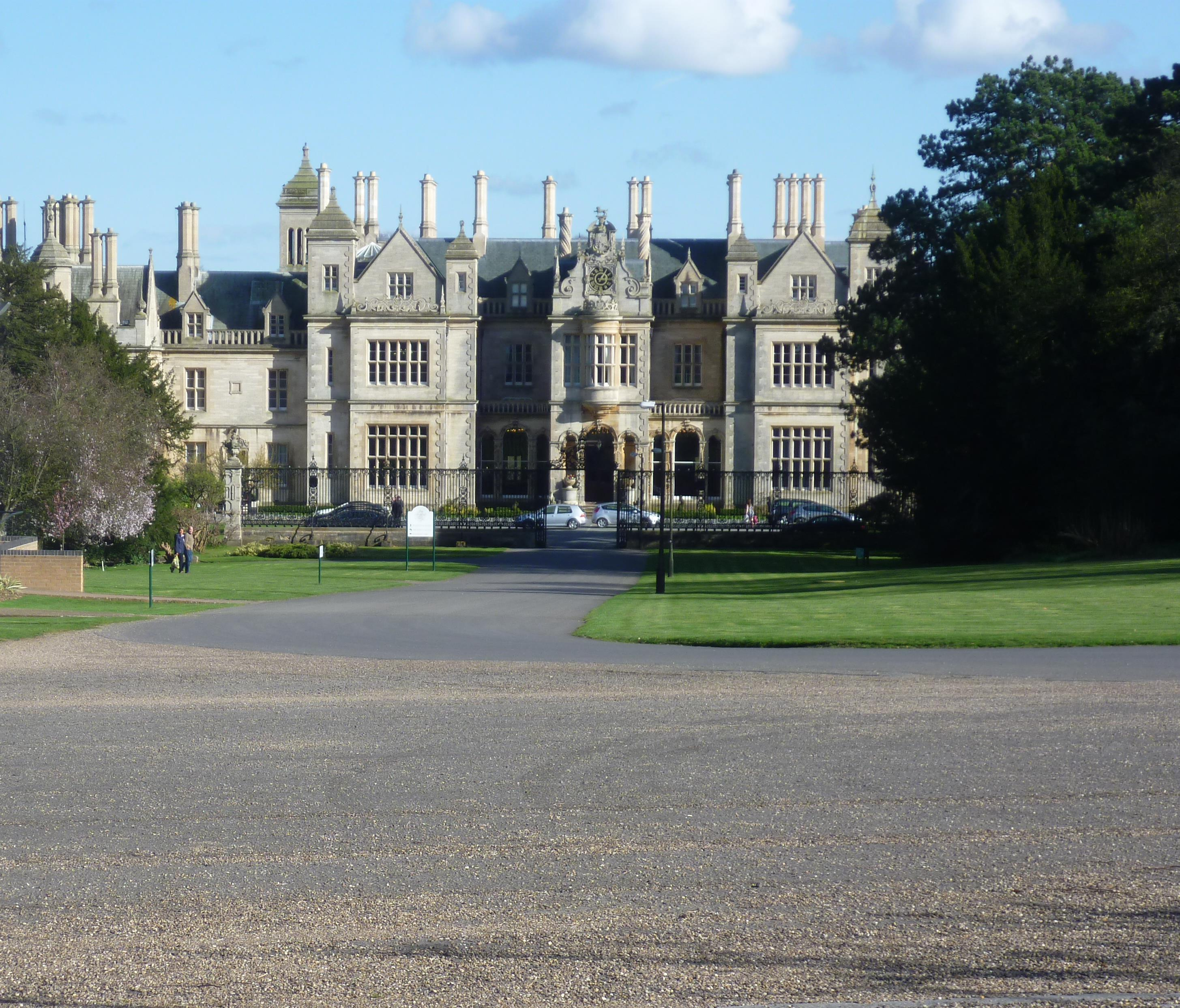
Stoke Rochford Hall

Christopher Turnor's great grandfather was Edmund Turnor (c. 1708–1769), of Stoke Rochford in Kesteven, and Panton in East Lindsey, Lincolnshire. His father was Edmund Turnor (1755–1829), FRS, FSA, MP for Midhurst, antiquarian, and the author of Collections for the History of the Town and Soke of Grantham Containing Authentic Memoirs of Sir Isaac Newton.

== Personal life ==
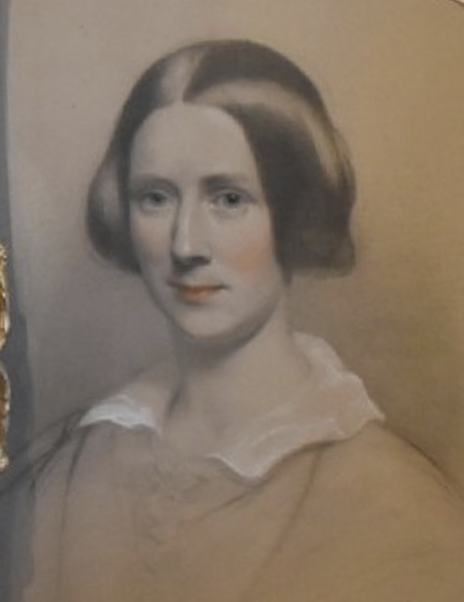
Lady Caroline Turnor née Finch-Hatton (1817-1888)

Turnor married on 2 February 1837 Lady Caroline Finch-Hatton (6 July 1816 – 13 March 1888), daughter of George Finch-Hatton, 10th Earl of Winchilsea (1791–1858) and Lady Georgiana, daughter of 3rd Duke of Montrose. Lady Caroline had been presented at St James's Palace in the Queen's drawing room three years earlier by her mother, she was noted wearing richest blue manteu with blond lace and trimmings. The Finch-Hatton family owned lands in Hertfordshire and parts of Hatton Garden in London. Turnor's son was Edmund Turnor (24 March 1838 – 15 December 1903), Member of Parliament for Grantham in 1868, and for South Lincolnshire from 1868 to 1880. A second son was Christopher Hatton Turnor (b. 16 Dec 1840), whose son was Christopher Hatton Turnor, author and architect, of Stoke Rochford (23 November 1873 – 1940), who married on 7 August 1907 Sarah Marie Talbot, daughter and heir of Admiral The Hon. Walter Cecil Carpenter, formerly Talbot.

Christopher Turnor and Lady Caroline Finch Hatton's children:

- Edmund Turnor (1838-1903)
- Christopher Hatton Turnor (1840), had issue Christopher Hatton Turnor (1872-1940)
- Algernon Turnor (1845-1921) m. Lady Henrietta Stewart, daughter of 9th Earl of Galloway. had issue Major Herbert Turnor, who married Lady Enid Rachel Fane, their daughter Rosemary Sybil Turnor married Alastair McCorquodale.
- Edith Georgiana Turnor, m. Frederick Campbell, 3rd Earl of Cawdor, had issue 4th Earl Cawdor.
- Graham Augustus Turnor
- Bertha Kathleen Turnor
- Dora Agnes Caroline Turnor (1858-1899), m. Benjamin Bloomfield Trench, had issue.

In 1844, The Marquess of Exeter invited Lady Caroline and her uncle Rev. Daniel Finch Hatton, alongside their spouses, Christopher Turnor and Lady Louisa Greville, to a banquet of limited sets at Burghley House for Queen Victoria and Prince Albert's visit there.

== Architecture ==
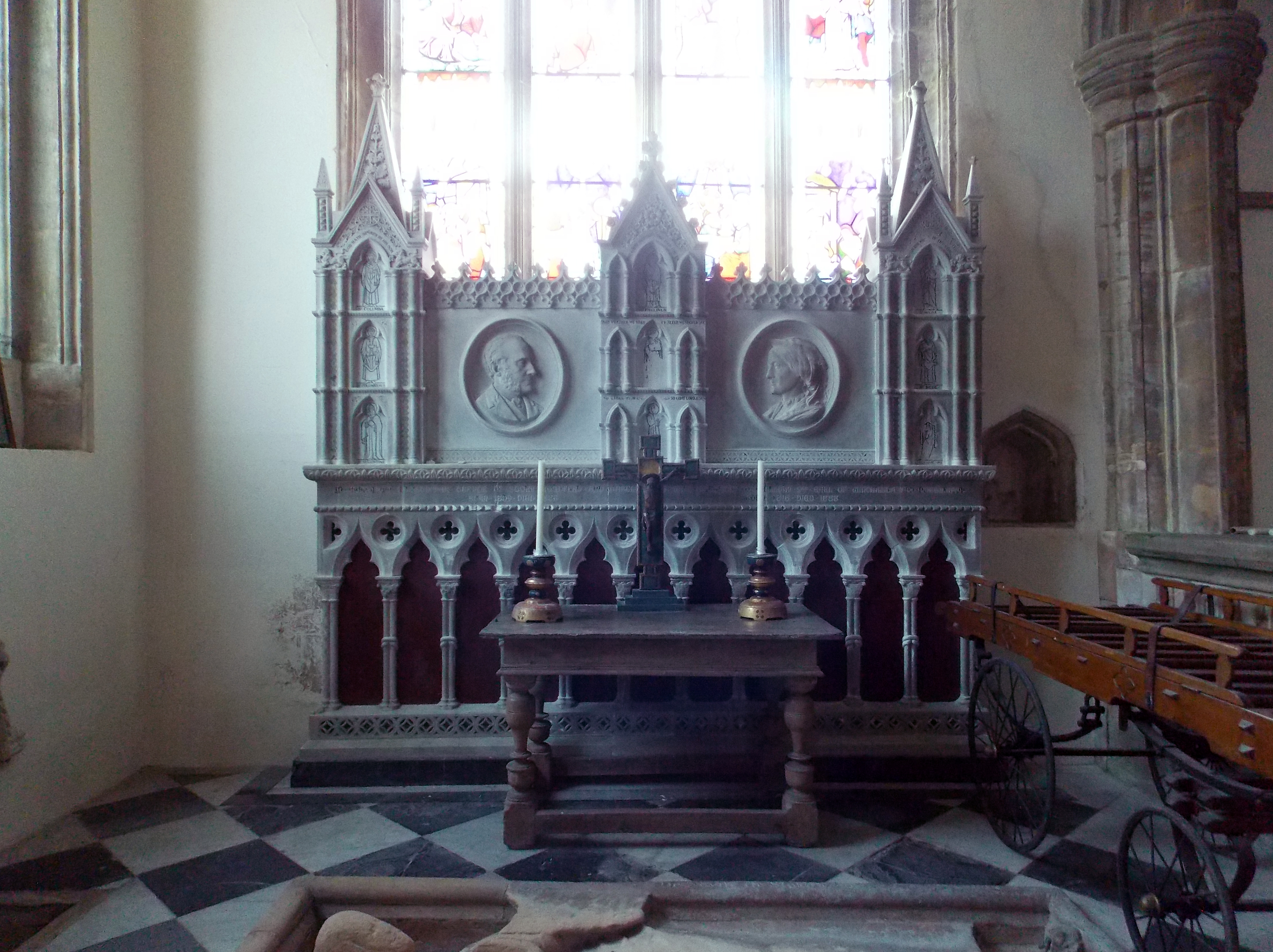
Chapel memorial reredos designed by Christopher Turnor for himself and his wife Lady Caroline in St Andrew and St Mary's Church, Stoke Rochford

Christopher Turnor's property and seat was the now Grade I listed Stoke Rochford Hall, today a hotel and conference centre. In 1839 architect William Burn was commissioned by Turnor to rebuild the previous 1794 Hall in Jacobean style, while the estate was emparked, extended and redesigned which required the removal of the village of North Stoke, its ecclesiastical parish being conjoined to South Stoke. The associated 20,000 acres (80 km^{2}) of the Stoke Rochford Estate, at the time the third largest in Lincolnshire, is still owned by the Turnor family. Turnor rebuilt and added houses and designed farm building complexes throughout Lincolnshire to a unified and coherent design using local materials. He provided for building design not just in Lincolnshire, or in Stoke Rochford which he turned into an estate village. His particular church and farmhouse additions and alterations were at Great Ponton, Panton, Lissington, Langworth, East Torrington, East Barkwith, Wragby, Binbrook and Kirmond le Mire. Turnor also promoted Lincolnshire county railways. While in London the Turnor's family home was 34 Chesham Place, Belgravia.

Christopher Turnor designed his and his wife's memorial for the north chancel chapel in St Andrew and St Mary's Church, Stoke Rochford.

Parliament of the United Kingdom
Preceded by Henry Handley; Gilbert Heathcote	Member of Parliament for South Lincolnshire; 1841 – 1847; With: John Trollope	Succeeded by William Cecil; John Trollope
