= Humble Petition and Advice =

1657 constitution of England, Scotland and Ireland

- Parliament of England
- Introduced by: Sir Christopher Packe
- Territorial extent: England; Scotland; Ireland; Other dominions

Dates
- Commencement: 25 May 1657

Other legislation
- Amended by: The removal of the "monarchy" clause
- Repealed by: Declaration of Breda; Indemnity and Oblivion Act
- Relates to: Instrument of Government

Status: Revoked

The Humble Petition and Advice was the second and last codified constitution of England after the Instrument of Government.

== Intention ==
The remonstrance came about largely as a result of the rise of the New Cromwellians, many of whom were moderate Presbyterians like Edward Montagu. They in themselves were an expression of strong latent support for monarchy and the English traditional constitutional limits on its power, a desire to lose the military overtones of the earlier Protectorate and the decreasing level of control Cromwell was able to exert due to ill health and frustration with a lack of revolutionary ideology amongst his subjects.

The intention of the Humble Petition and Advice was to offer a hereditary monarchy to Oliver Cromwell, to assert Parliament's control over new taxation, to provide an independent council to advise the king, to assure the holding of 'Triennial' meetings (every three years) of Parliament, and to reduce the size of the standing army in order to save money, amongst other things. These limited, rather than increased, Cromwell's power. However, the real sticking point for many radicals were Clauses 10 through 12; these placed severe restrictions on sects like Fifth Monarchists and Baptists, while seeking to re-establish a national church structured along Presbyterian lines.

== Presentation and kingship debate ==
On 23 February 1657, during a sitting of the Second Protectorate Parliament, Sir Christopher Packe, a Member of Parliament and former Lord Mayor of London presented the Lord Protector Oliver Cromwell with a remonstrance which became known as the Humble Petition and Advice.

Although he presented it, Packe was not the author and was chosen by those supporting kingship as a less controversial character than the leaders of the kingship party.

On 8 May 1657, Cromwell refused the crown. There is much speculation among historians as to why he did so. One popular assertion is that he feared disaffection in the army, especially considering the proposed reduction in its size. Others include that he was distressed by allegations of dynastic ambition, he did not genuinely accept that a monarchy was necessary in England, or that he feared reinstating a monarchy on the basis that he believed the monarchy had been judged by God in the period following the First English Civil War.

== Amendment and acceptance ==
The Humble Petition and Advice was amended to remove the clause on kingship. The Nayler case caused it also to be modified to include a second chamber.

On 25 May, Cromwell ratified a modified Humble Petition and Advice and said that he would nominate his successor as Lord Protector.

== Sources ==
- Catterall, Ralph C.H. (1903). "The Failure of the Humble Petition and Advice". American Historical Review. 9 (1): 36–65. doi:10.2307/1834218. JSTOR 1834218.
- Coward, Barry, The Cromwellian Protectorate New frontiers in history, Manchester University Press, 2002, ISBN 9780719043178
- Davies, JJ (2004). "Montagu [Mountagu], Edward, first earl of Sandwich". Oxford Dictionary of National Biography (online ed.). Oxford University Press. doi:10.1093/ref:odnb/19010. (Subscription, Wikipedia Library access or UK public library membership required.)
- Fritze, Ronald H. & Robison, William B. Historical dictionary of Stuart England, 1603–1689, Greenwood Publishing Group, 1996. ISBN 978-0-313-28391-8
- Lee, Sidney (1903), Dictionary of National Biography Index and Epitome
- Noble, Mark. Memoirs of the protectoral-house of Cromwell: deduced from an early period, and continued down to the present time; ... collected chiefly from original papers and records, ... together with an appendix: ... Embellished with elegant engravings. Volume 1, The third edition, Printed for G. G. J. and J. Robinson, 1787. p. 416.
