= Anthony Wilson (MP) =

Anthony Wilson was a Member of Parliament of the United Kingdom for the constituency of Lincolnshire, Parts of Kesteven and Holland from 27 March 1857 to 28 April 1859.
