= George Hussey Packe =

English politician (1796–1874)

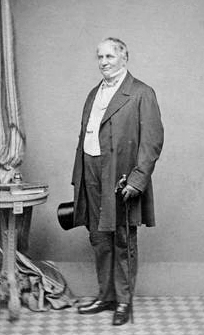
- George Hussey Packe (1863)

Member of Parliament for Lincolnshire, Parts of Kesteven and Holland
- In office May 1859 – November 1868

Personal details
- Born: 1 May 1796 Hanthorpe, Lincolnshire, England
- Died: 2 July 1874 (aged 78) Westminster, London
- Party: Liberal
- Known for: Member of Parliament, chairman of the Great Northern Railway

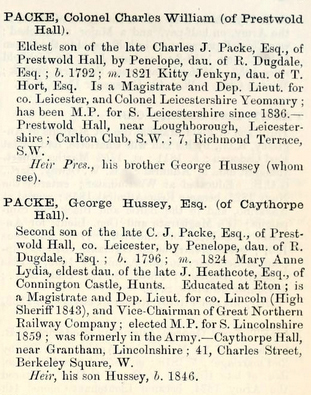
George Hussey Packe biographical note in The county families of the United Kingdom; or, Royal manual of the titled and untitled aristocracy of Great Britain and Ireland, 1860

George Hussey Packe (1 May 1796 – 2 July 1874) was a United Kingdom Member of Parliament, an army officer present at the Battle of Waterloo, and was instrumental in establishing the Great Northern Railway.

== Personal life ==
George Hussey Packe was a scion of the family of Sir Christopher Packe, a 17th-century Lord Mayor of London. He was born at Hanthorpe House, Morton and Hanthorpe, Lincolnshire in 1796, the second son to Charles James Packe (1758–1837), of Prestwold Hall, Leicestershire, and his first wife Penelope, of Blythe Hall, Warwickshire. He married in 1824 Maryanne-Lidia (1796–1876), daughter of John Heathcote – of Connington Castle, Huntingdonshire, and MP for Ripon – and Mary Anne (née Thornhill). They had two children: Marianne Penelope Packe (1832–1921) and Hussey Packe (1846–1908).

Packe inherited Prestwold Hall and its estates. Caythorpe Hall at Caythorpe, Lincolnshire was a further residence, built for him in 1823, and a rebuild of a previous hall, the residence of Sir Giles Hussey. With Caythorpe Hall came 4,000 acres of estate. Packe was Lord of the manor of Caythorpe, with the parish living and rectory under his patronage. He built and supported the village school connected to St Vincent's Church, and for the church provided a peal of eight bells and a clock.

By 1836 he had become a Justice of the Peace for Leicestershire, Kesteven in Lincolnshire, and Huntingdonshire. He was also chairman of the Kesteven Quarter Sessions, a Deputy Lieutenant of Lincolnshire, and, in 1843, High sheriff of Lincolnshire.

In 1871 Packe gave evidence to a House of Lords committee in support of a petition by Clementina Elizabeth, Dowager Lady Aveland of Grimsthorpe Castle. The petition, presented upon the death of her brother, Albyric Drummond-Willoughby, sought to attach the descendency of the Heathcote Baronetcy to her in preference to her sister. Packe stated his close personal knowledge of the Willoughby de Eresby family, that Albyric Drummond-Willoughby died without heir, and corroborated details of the Dowager Lady Aveland's siblings.

George Hussey Packe died 2 July 1874, aged 78, at 41 Charles Street, Berkeley Square, London, and was buried at Prestwold, where a monument to him lies within St Andrew's Church.

After his death the Prestwold and Caythorpe Hall estates were inherited by his son, Hussey Packe. Hussey Packe married in 1872 Lady Alice Wodehouse (1850–1937), daughter of the 3rd Baron Wodehouse KG, PC.

== Military career ==
George Hussey Packe entered the army in 1813, and fought as a cornet in the 13th Light Dragoons at the Battle of Waterloo, where he was wounded. Packe had embarked for the Waterloo campaign in May 1815, landing at Ostend, from where he began a series of 'Waterloo letters' to his father. He continued writing about his experiences until January 1816. His uncle, Major Robert Christopher Packe, the half brother of his father, and ADC to the King, was killed in the battle. George Hussey Packe became a captain in the 21st Light Dragoons on 27 June 1816 – the same year he was put on reserve and placed on half-pay. He was promoted from captain to major in the 43rd Regiment of Foot in 1837, and to Lieutenant-Colonel in 1851. He retired from the army in 1861 on half-pay.

== Railway interests ==
In 1830 George Hussey Packe's father, Charles James Packe, had become a director of the Leicester and Swannington Railway, opened 1832. George Hussey himself became part of a Lincolnshire group of landowners, including Lord Worsley, who presented to Parliament an 1844 scheme for a railway between Cambridge and York, as part of a number of companies' proposals vying for London to York railway links. Packe's group's proposition was opposed by four competing companies, including the Eastern Counties Railway, and they responded by surveying a route from their proposed line at Cambridge, through Peterborough, to London. Competing London to York schemes included those by Direct Northern and Great Northern (GNR) railway committees. Later in the year Packe, and other Cambridge and York group members, joined the GNR proposal as part of a new London and York railway committee, with Packe becoming one of its directors. The committee considered two routes: one through the Fens, which would have included Cambridge; the other a more direct 'towns' line from London via Peterborough, Stamford, Grantham, Newark, Retford, and Doncaster – the latter route was adopted.

Some proposers of the previous Cambridge and York fen route scheme resigned from the London and York committee, but Packe stayed. Further opposition from Lincoln, Gainsborough and Boston quarters prompted the London and York committee to develop a scheme for an East Lincolnshire Railway (ELR) between Boston and Grimsby, under a joint proposal with the Great Grimsby and Sheffield Junction Railway, an act for which was obtained in 1847 – Packe with fellow London and York committee members, including Charles Tennyson-d'Eyncourt, became directors of the scheme.

Packe was a director and the deputy chairman of the GNR between 1847 and 1864, after which he became chairman until his death in 1874 – he was also a director of other GNR companies, and by 1849 was ELR chairman. In 1857 Pack was named as a defendant, with other GNR directors, in an action taken by preference stock holders of the GNR to receive dividends from company profits. The plaintiff's case was proved, an appeal against the ruling was dismissed.

The Honington to Lincoln branch of the GNR Grantham to Skegness line ran through George Hussey Packe's land at Caythorpe, where, by the early 1880s, companies were working opencast mines for ironstone, the first being the West Yorkshire Iron and Coal Company in the late 1870s. Such mining on Packe's land was the first in south-west Lincolnshire.

== Political career ==
George Hussey Packe was MP for South Lincolnshire from 1859 to 1868.

He was one of three candidates proposed for the 1847 general election to the UK Parliament for the Newark constituency, alongside John Stuart and John Manners-Sutton. In the proposal Packe is described as "a promoter of the London and York Railway". Newark was represented by two seats which Stuart and Manners-Sutton won.

Packe was selected to fight the 1859 general election on behalf of the Liberal Party, being described as "a gentleman supported by high family connections, and having the advantage in all the large towns, of the railway influence incident to his position as Deputy Chairman of the Great Northern Company." Fellow constituency opponents at hustings, held at Sleaford Market Place on 1 April, were Sir John Trollope, and Anthony Willson – of South Rauceby Hall, and in 1854 High Sheriff of Lincolnshire – both Conservative. Packe had visited all the principal towns of South Lincolnshire to promote his cause. His written March address to the freeholders and electors of South Lincolnshire expressed strong and independent support for Lord Palmerston, the Prime Minister, who had called the 1857 election after losing a vote of censure in Parliament over the conduct of the Second Opium War – Packe felt that Palmerston was deserving of the country's support. Packe stated his intention to encourage civil and religious liberty, and "agricultural interest". He believed that public expenditure should be curtailed, but with the maintenance of naval and military spending commensurate with keeping of the peace. Packe won one of the two constituency seats.

He was reelected for Parliament for the Lincolnshire, Parts of Kesteven and Holland constituency in 1865.

== Sources ==
- Wright, Neil R. (1982); Lincolnshire Towns and Industry 1700–1914; History of Lincolnshire Committee for the Society for Lincolnshire History and Archaeology. ISBN 0902668102
