= Burton on the Wolds =

Village in Leicestershire, England

Coordinates: 52°47′5.00″N 1°7′40.50″W

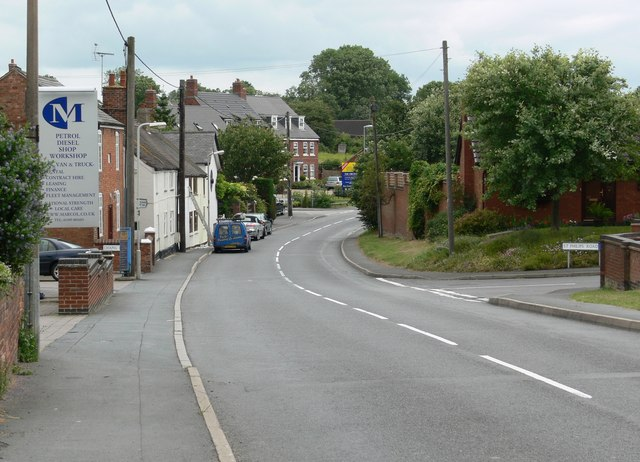

- Location within Leicestershire
- Population: 1,218
- District: Charnwood
- Shire county: Leicestershire
- Region: East Midlands
- Country: England
- Sovereign state: United Kingdom
- Post town: LOUGHBOROUGH
- Postcode district: LE12
- Police: Leicestershire
- Fire: Leicestershire
- Ambulance: East Midlands
- UK Parliament: Loughborough

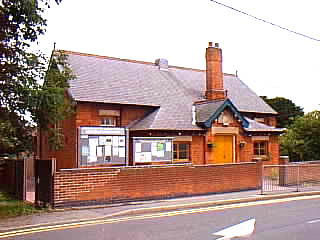

Burton on the Wolds is a village in Leicestershire, England, situated on the B676 road 3 miles (4.8 km) west of the A46 and about the same distance to the east of Loughborough, close to the county border with Nottinghamshire. In the 2011 census, the population was measured at 1,218. The Parish Council of Burton on the Wolds, Cotes and Prestwold serves the village and its two neighbouring hamlets. The local borough council is Charnwood.

The village's name means 'farm/settlement with a fortification'.

The village is listed in the Domesday Book, showing it comprised 15 households in the year 1086. In the Middle Ages Burton was the property of Garendon Abbey.

After World War II, a Polish camp was set up in the village, due to its proximity to RAF Wymeswold, which opened in 1942 and closed in 1957. It now hosts an industrial complex containing Jump Giants Loughborough.

Burton has its own primary school, pub and shop (in the garage).

The Lion's Head water fountain was probably built in the mid 19th century.

Prestwold Hall, which was built in the 18th century, is within the parish of Prestwold, but part of the grounds falls within the Burton on the Wolds parish.

== Sport ==
The village has two football teams that play in the North Leicestershire League division one, and the Charnwood Sunday League division one. Home games are played at Towles Fields.

Burton also has a long-established cricket club who in 2010 merged with one of the County's largest and most successful clubs, Barrow Town. Now named Barrow and Burton Cricket Club, the club has four teams represented in the Everards Leicestershire County Cricket League and also the Leicestershire Senior Cricket League.
