= James Dormer =

British Army officer

Lieutenant-General James Dormer

British Ambassador to Portugal
- In office 1725–1728
- Preceded by: Hon. Thomas Lumley
- Succeeded by: Charles Crompton

Arms of Dormer: Azure, ten billets or 4,3,2,1 issuant from a chief of the second a demi-lion rampant sable

James Dormer (1679–1741) was a British Army officer, a lieutenant-general, and colonel of the 1st troop of Horse Grenadier Guards

== Life ==
The son of Robert Dormer (1628?–1689) of Dorton, Buckinghamshire, and his second wife, Anne, daughter of Sir Charles Cotterell, he was born 16 March 1679. He was appointed lieutenant and captain in the 1st Foot Guards 13 June 1700, at which rank he was wounded at the battle of Blenheim, in the War of the Spanish Succession, where his brother Philip was killed.

In command of a newly raised corps of Irish foot, Dormer went to Spain, and took part in the Battle of Saragossa. He was taken prisoner with General James Stanhope at Brihuega in December 1710, and was sent home on parole. On the death of Charles Mohun, 4th Baron Mohun in a noted duel with the Duke of Hamilton in 1712, Dormer, who had been exchanged, was appointed colonel of Mohun's regiment, which was disbanded the year after.

In 1715 Dormer was commissioned to raise a regiment of dragoons in the south of England, which became the 14th King's Hussars. He commanded a brigade during the Lancashire Jacobite rising of 1715, and engaged with the rebels at Preston. Transferred to the colonelcy of the 6th Foot in 1720, he was in June 1725 sent as envoy extraordinary to Lisbon. There he was in dispute with Thomas Burnett, the British consul.

Dormer was appointed a lieutenant-general and colonel 1st troop of Horse Grenadier Guards in 1737, and Governor of Kingston-upon-Hull in 1740. He died at Crendon, Buckinghamshire, 24 December 1741. A member of the Kit-Cat Club, he collected a fine library, and is said to have been an acquaintance of Jonathan Swift. He was unmarried, and bequeathed the Chearsley and Rousham estates to his cousin Clement Cottrell-Dormer.

== Notes ==
Diplomatic posts
Preceded by Hon. Thomas Lumley	Envoy to Portugal; 1725–1728	Succeeded by Charles Crompton

Attribution

This article incorporates text from a publication now in the public domain: Stephen, Leslie, ed. (1888). "Dormer, James". Dictionary of National Biography. Vol. 15. London: Smith, Elder & Co.
