= Anne Dormer =

Anne Dormer may refer to:

- Lady Anne Hungerford (née Dormer, 1525–1603), English courtier during the reign of Queen Mary I and poet
- Anne Dormer (letter-writer) (née Cotterell, c. 1648–1695), wife of Robert Dormer of Rousham in Oxfordshire
