= Clement Cottrell-Dormer =

English courtier and antiquary

Sir Clement Cottrell-Dormer (1686–1758) was an English courtier and antiquary. (Note: Before 1741 Cottrell-Dormer was known as Clement Cottrell or Clement Cotterell)

== Biography ==
Cottrell was born in Westminster, Middlesex, England on 2 April 1686. He was the son of Sir Charles Lodowick Cotterell (1654–1710), and his first wife Eliza, daughter of Nicholas Burwell of Gray's Inn.

On his father's death Cottrell became Master of the Ceremonies. The office of Master of the Ceremonies at the British court had been established by James I of England in 1603. The Master's duties were to receive foreign dignitaries and present them to the monarch at court. Sir Clement held that office from 1710 until 1758, during the reigns of Queen Anne, King George I and King George II.

He was also vice-president of the Society of Antiquaries. In 1734 he was described by Hearne as "a scholar and an antiquary, and well skill'd in matters of proceeding and ceremony".

Dormer's Name Act 1741
- Act of Parliament
- Parliament of Great Britain
- Long title: An Act to enable Sir Clement Cottrell Knight, and other the Devisees of the Real Estate of Lieutenant General James Dormer, deceased, to take and use the Surname of Dormer, pursuant and according to the Tenor and Purport of the Will of the said James Dormer.
- Citation: 15 Geo. 2. c. 7 Pr.
- Territorial extent: Great Britain

Dates
- Royal assent: 16 March 1742
- Commencement: 1 December 1741 (Note: Start of session.)

Status: Current legislation

On the death of his cousin, General James Dormer in 1741, Cottrell inherited the Rousham estates and assumed the additional surname of Dormer by a private act of Parliament, Dormer's Name Act 1741 (15 Geo. 2. c. 7 Pr.).

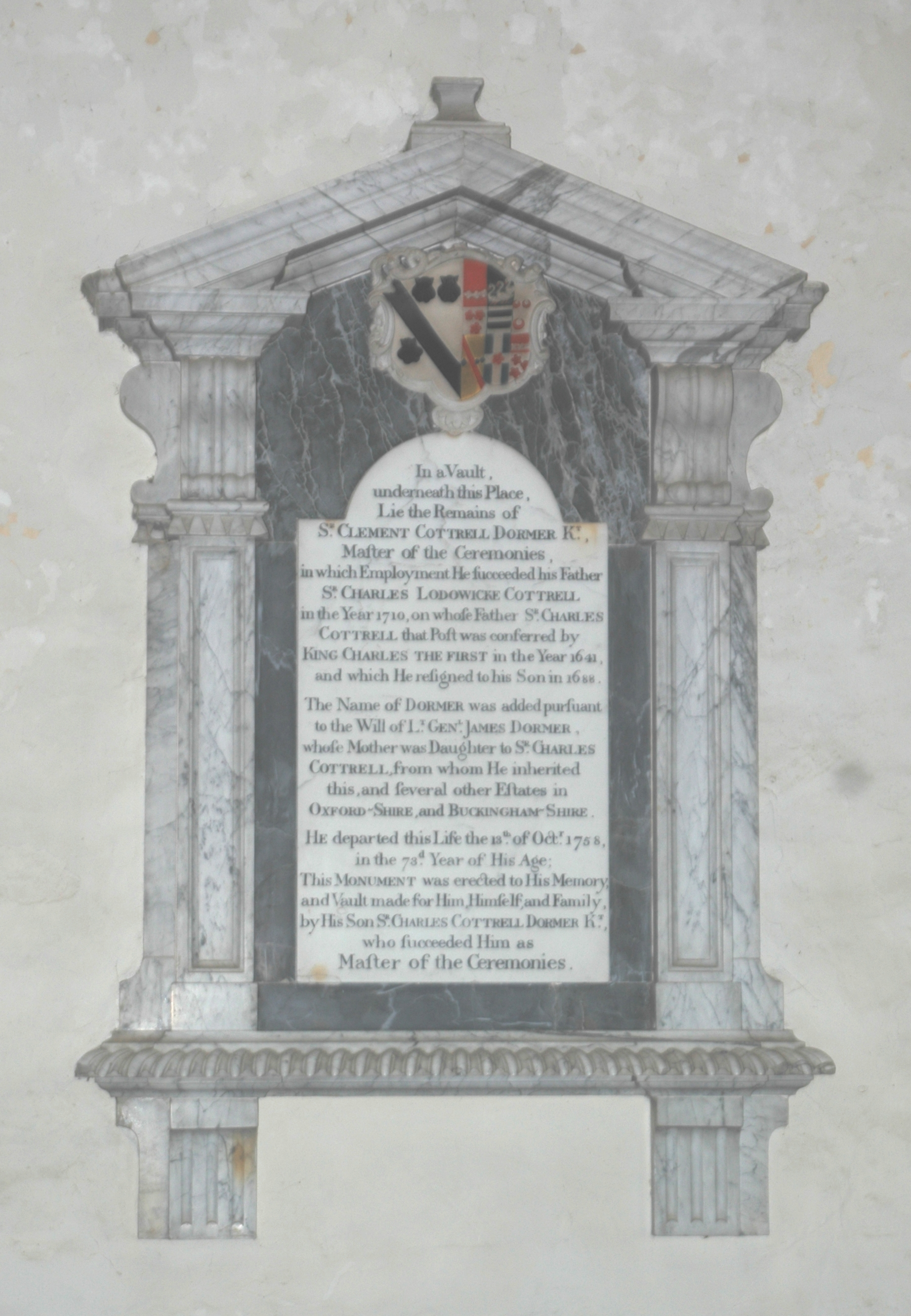
Church monument in Rousham erected to Clement Cottrell-Dormer, heir to James Dormer who added Dormer to his surname

Cottrell died in Rousham, Oxfordshire, England on 13 October 1758.

== Family ==
Cottrell married Bridget Sherborne (1696–1731)—only daughter and heir of Davenant and Mary Sherborne of Pembridge, Herefordshire—on 14 April 1716. They had two sons and five daughters who reached maturity:

- Charles (1720–1779), who followed in the family footsteps and became master of the ceremonies.
- Robert (died 1744), became a marine, perished at sea, and predeceased his father.
- Mary (died 1753), predeceased her father.
- Bridget (1719–1801), their second daughter became a maid of honour to Princess Anne.

Sir Clement's son, Sir Charles Cottrell-Dormer, who died in 1779, and grandson, Sir Clement Cottrell-Dormer, who died in 1808, each became Master of the Ceremonies. In 1900 the family was represented by C. Cottrell Dormer, and in his library contained a valuable collection of letters and papers relating to Sir Charles Cotterell, Sir Charles Lodowick, and Sir Clement Cotterell.
