= Clement Cotterell =

Clement Cotterell may refer to:

- Clement Cotterell (MP) (died 1631), English courtier and politician who sat in the House of Commons from 1621 to 1624
- Clement Cottrell-Dormer (1686–1758), English courtier and antiquary
- Clement Cottrell (1854–1897), English cricketer and tennis player
