= Justices Commitment Act 1741 =

Act of the Parliament of Great Britain

Justices Commitment Act 1741 (Note: The citation of this act by this short title was authorised by section 1 of, and the first schedule to, the Short Titles Act 1896. Due to the repeal of those provisions it is now authorised by section 19(2) of the Interpretation Act 1978.)
- Act of Parliament
- Parliament of Great Britain
- Long title: An Act to empower the Justices of the Peace of a Liberty or Corporation to commit Offenders to the House of Correction of the County, Riding, or Division, in which such Liberty or Corporation is situate.
- Citation: 15 Geo. 2. c. 24
- Territorial extent: Great Britain

Dates
- Royal assent: 16 June 1742
- Commencement: 1 December 1741 (Note: Start of session)
- Repealed: 1 December 1914
Other legislation
Repealed by	Criminal Justice Administration Act 1914

Status: Repealed

Text of statute as originally enacted

The Justices Commitment Act 1741 (15 Geo. 2. c. 24) was an act of the Parliament of Great Britain passed in 1742 and formally repealed in 1914. It clarified the powers of justices of the peace to imprison convicts.

Many towns did not maintain their own prisons, and as such the power of Justices in those towns to sentence someone to imprisonment had become questioned. To resolve doubts which had arisen on the matter, the act declared that the justices of the peace of a liberty or corporation, on sentencing someone to be sent to a house of correction, could send them to the house of correction of the county in which the liberty or corporation was situated.

== Subsequent developments ==
The whole act was repealed by section 44 of, and schedule 4 to, the Criminal Justice Administration Act 1914 (4 & 5 Geo. 5. c. 58), which came into force on 1 December 1914.
