= Charles Beaumont Phipps =

British Army officer and courtier

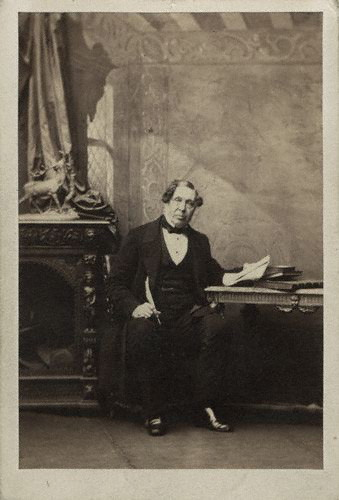
Sir Charles Beaumont Phipps

Colonel Sir Charles Beaumont Phipps KCB (27 December 1801 – 24 February 1866), was a British soldier and courtier.

He was the second son of Henry Phipps, 1st Earl of Mulgrave, and was born at the family estate of Mulgrave Castle in 1801. Educated at Harrow, Phipps joined the army by purchasing a commission as an ensign and lieutenant in the Scots Fusilier Guards on 17 August 1820. He ranked as lieutenant and captain by 1 January 1828, when he was made adjutant.

In 1832, his brother Constantine, then 2nd Earl of Mulgrave, was appointed Governor of Jamaica, and Charles accompanied him as his private secretary. Mulgrave left the governorship in 1834, and was appointed Lord Lieutenant of Ireland in 1835; Phipps continued with him to act as steward of his official household. He purchased a commission as captain and lieutenant-colonel on 26 May 1837.

On 1 August 1846, Phipps was appointed an Equerry in Ordinary to Queen Victoria, succeeding Charles George James Arbuthnot, and hereafter was much in the royal household. He was appointed private secretary to Prince Albert on 1 January 1847, and went on half-pay from the Army later that month as a lieutenant-colonel.

On 10 October 1849 Phipps replaced George Edward Anson as Keeper of the Privy Purse, Treasurer and Cofferer to the Prince of Wales, and Treasurer to Prince Albert, resigning his post as private secretary.

He was promoted colonel (unattached) in 1851. He received the CB on 9 September 1853 and retired from the army the following year.

In 1858, he received the KCB. Phipps was much in the confidence of Victoria and Albert, and aided Charles Grey in his duties as Private Secretary to the Sovereign after the death of Albert in 1861. He was appointed Receiver-General of the Duchy of Cornwall on 26 May 1862, and was appointed to the Council of the Prince of Wales on 27 January 1863.

On 8 February 1864, he received the additional offices of Secretary, Chamberlain and Receiver-General and Keeper of the Signet to the Prince of Wales as Prince and Steward of Scotland. Phipps died of bronchitis at St James's Palace on 24 February 1866, and was buried in St George's Chapel at Windsor Castle on 2 March 1866.

== Family ==
Phipps married, on 25 June 1835, to Margaret Anne Bathurst (d. 1874). The couple had four children:

- Maria Henrietta Sophia Phipps (d.1915), wife of army officer and courtier lieutenant-colonel William Chaine (or Cheyne)
- Harriet Lepel Phipps (1841–1922), a confidential attendant to Queen Victoria, died unmarried and without issue
- Charles Edmund Phipps (1844–1906), married Susan Stuart Geddes, had issue
- Albert Augustus Phipps (1847–1875), killed in India while serving in the 60th King's Royal Rifle Corps, no issue

== In popular culture ==
A heavily re-imagined, more youthful version of Phipps appears as a character in popular manga and anime franchise Black Butler, with a key role in Black Butler: Book of Murder.

Court offices
Preceded by George Edward Anson	Keeper of the Privy Purse; 1849–1866	Succeeded by Thomas Myddelton Biddulph
