= Master of the Ceremonies =

The office of Master of the Ceremonies was established by James VI and I. The Master's duties were to receive foreign dignitaries and present them to the monarch at court. Below is a list of known holders until the replacement of the office by the Marshal of the Diplomatic Corps in 1920.

== Masters of the Ceremonies ==
- 1603–1627: Sir Lewes Lewkenor
- 1627–1641: Sir John Finett
- 1641–1686: Sir Charles Cotterell
- 1686–1710: Sir Charles Lodowick Cotterell
- 1710–1758: Sir Clement Cottrell (later Cottrell-Dormer)
- 1758–1779: Sir Charles Cottrell-Dormer
- 1779–1796: Sir Clement Cottrell-Dormer
- 1796–1818: Sir Stephen (or Samuel) Cottrell
- 1818–1847: Sir Robert Chester
- 1847–1876: Sir Edward Cust, 1st Baronet
- 1876–1890: Sir Francis Seymour, 1st Baronet
- 1890–1893: Sir Christopher Teesdale
- 1893–1903: Sir William James Colville
- 1903–1907: Sir Douglas Dawson
- 1907–1920: Sir Arthur Walsh

== Assistant Masters of the Ceremonies ==
- 1668–1672: Charles Cotterell
- 1672–1686: Charles Lodowick Cotterell
- 1686–1699: John Dormer
- 1699–1707: Clement Cotterell
- 1710–1740: John Inglis
- 1740–1758: Charles Cotterell
- 1758–1796: Stephen Cotterell
- 1796–1818: Robert Chester
- 1818–1822: Robert Chester (jnr.)
- 1822–1823: William John Crosbie
- 1823–1825: Henry Thomas Baucutt Mash
- 1825–1845: Thomas Seymour Hyde
- 1845–1847: Sir Edward Cust, 1st Baronet
- 1847–1855: William Henry Cornwall
- 1855–1881: Charles Bagot
- 1881–1887: Augustus Savile
- 1887–1901: William Chaine

== Marshals of the Ceremonies ==
- 1660: Amice Andros
- 1669: Thomas Sambourne
- 1673: Richard Le Bas
- 1704: John Inglis (also Assistant Master from 1710)
- 1740: Robert Cotterell
- 1745: Charles Cotterell (also Assistant Master since 1740)
- 1759: Thomas Wright
- 1761: Stephen Cotterell (also Assistant Master since 1758)
- 1796: Robert Chester, senior (also Assistant Master)
- 1818: Robert Chester, junior (also Assistant Master)
- 1822: William John Crosbie (also Assistant Master)
- 1823: Henry Thomas Baucutt Mash (also Assistant Master)
- 1825: Thomas Seymour Hyde (also Assistant Master)
- 1845: William Henry Cornwall
- 1847: Spencer Lyttelton
- 1877: Augustus Savile Lumley
- 1881: William Chaine
- 1887: Richard Charles Moreton
- 1913: Charles Hubert Montgomery

== Assistant Marshals of the Ceremonies ==
- 1699: Charles Sambourne Le Bas
- 1899: Sir Robert Follett Synge (retitled Deputy Marshal in 1902)
