= William Chaine =

Lieutenant-Colonel William Chaine, MVO (1 January 1838 – 3 July 1916) was a British military officer and courtier.

== Military and Court career ==
Chaine was born in Antrim in 1838, the son of William Chaine, of Moylina, Co. Antrim, and was a Lieutenant of the Antrim Artillery Militia in his early teens. He was commissioned as a Cornet in the 7th Dragoon Guards in December 1856, promoted to Lieutenant in October 1857, and Captain (by purchase) in May 1864.

One month later, in June 1864, he exchanged from the Dragoon guards to the 10th Hussars, where he remained until he retired from the army.

In October 1877 came a Brevet promotion to Major. He retired from the army in July 1881, and received the honorary rank of Lieutenant-colonel. On 4 March 1881 Chaine was appointed Marshal of the Ceremonies to Queen Victoria, and in 1887 he advanced to Assistant Master of the Ceremonies to the Queen. He resigned shortly after the accession of King Edward VII in 1901.

He was appointed a Member of the Royal Victorian Order (MVO) by King Edward VII in July 1901 (the order was gazetted 16 August 1901).

== Family ==
Chaine was married, in the Private Chapel, Kensington Palace, on 4 December 1872, to Maria Henrietta Sophia Phipps (1837–1915), widow of Captain Frederick Sayer, and the daughter of Sir Charles Beaumont Phipps, KCB (1801–1866) by his wife Margaret Anne (née Bathurst). They had a son, W. R. Chaine.

Mrs. Chaine held the office of Keeper of the State Apartments at Kensington Palace, and was close to Queen Alexandra and other royal family members. The couple were allowed the use of a grace and favour appartement at the palace, a rare gift. She died at Kensington Palace 21 December 1915, and he himself died at Kensington Palace in July the following year.

Court offices
Preceded by Augustus Savile	Assistant Master of the Ceremonies; 1887-1901	Succeeded by Robert Follett Synge
