= List of acts of the Parliament of Great Britain from 1741 =

This is a complete list of acts of the Parliament of Great Britain for the year 1741.

For acts passed until 1707, see the list of acts of the Parliament of England and the list of acts of the Parliament of Scotland. See also the list of acts of the Parliament of Ireland.

For acts passed from 1801 onwards, see the list of acts of the Parliament of the United Kingdom. For acts of the devolved parliaments and assemblies in the United Kingdom, see the list of acts of the Scottish Parliament, the list of acts of the Northern Ireland Assembly, and the list of acts and measures of Senedd Cymru; see also the list of acts of the Parliament of Northern Ireland.

The number shown after each act's title is its chapter number. Acts are cited using this number, preceded by the year(s) of the reign during which the relevant parliamentary session was held; thus the Union with Ireland Act 1800 is cited as "39 & 40 Geo. 3. c. 67", meaning the 67th act passed during the session that started in the 39th year of the reign of George III and which finished in the 40th year of that reign. Note that the modern convention is to use Arabic numerals in citations (thus "41 Geo. 3" rather than "41 Geo. III"). Acts of the last session of the Parliament of Great Britain and the first session of the Parliament of the United Kingdom are both cited as "41 Geo. 3".

Acts passed by the Parliament of Great Britain did not have a short title; however, some of these acts have subsequently been given a short title by acts of the Parliament of the United Kingdom (such as the Short Titles Act 1896).

Before the Acts of Parliament (Commencement) Act 1793 came into force on 8 April 1793, acts passed by the Parliament of Great Britain were deemed to have come into effect on the first day of the session in which they were passed. Because of this, the years given in the list below may in fact be the year before a particular act was passed.

== 15 Geo. 2 ==
The first session of the 9th Parliament of Great Britain, which met from 1 December 1741 until 15 July 1742.

This session was also traditionally cited as 15 G. 2, 15 & 16 Geo. 2 or 15 & 16 G. 2.

=== Public acts ===
Short title	Citation	Royal assent
Long title
Taxation Act 1741 (repealed)	15 Geo. 2. c. 1	3 February 1742
An Act for continuing the Duties upon Malt, Mum, Cyder, and Perry, in that Part of Great Britain called England; and for granting to His Majesty certain Duties upon Malt, Mum, Cyder, and Perry, in that Part of Great Britain called Scotland; for the Service of the Year One Thousand Seven Hundred and Forty-two. (Repealed by Statute Law Revision Act 1867 (30 & 31 Vict. c. 59))
Highways Act 1741 (repealed)	15 Geo. 2. c. 2	3 February 1742
An Act to repeal so much of an Act passed in the last Session of Parliament, intituled, "An Act for the Preservation of the Public Roads in that Part of Great Britain called England," (Note: Preservation of Roads Act 1740 (14 Geo. 2. c. 42)) as obliges Persons not travelling for Hire, to make Use of Waggons with Wheels bound with Streaks, or Tyre, of a certain Breadth, or the said Streaks to be fastened with Nails of a certain Size. (Repealed by Highways (No. 2) Act 1766 (7 Geo. 3. c. 42))
Supply Act 1741 (repealed)	15 Geo. 2. c. 3	16 March 1742
An Act for granting to His Majesty a certain Sum, out of the Sinking Fund, towards the Supply for the Service of the Year One Thousand Seven Hundred and Forty-two. (Repealed by Statute Law Revision Act 1867 (30 & 31 Vict. c. 59))
Mutiny Act 1741 (repealed)	15 Geo. 2. c. 4	16 March 1742
An Act for punishing Mutiny and Desertion; and for the better Payment of the Army and their Quarters. (Repealed by Statute Law Revision Act 1867 (30 & 31 Vict. c. 59))
Buckinghamshire Roads Act 1741 (repealed)	15 Geo. 2. c. 5	15 April 1742
An Act for continuing and making more effectual an Act made in the Seventh Year of the Reign of His late Majesty King George the First, intituled, "An Act for repairing the Road from Wendover, to the Town of Buckingham, in the County of Bucks;" (Note: Buckinghamshire Roads Act 1720 (7 Geo. 1. St. 1. c. 24)) and for building a Bridge at Padbury, and making it a County Bridge. (Repealed by Beaconsfield and Uxbridge Road Act 1806 (46 Geo. 3. c. cii), Wendover and Buckingham Road Act 1810 (50 Geo. 3. c. xcix) and Roads from Wendover and from the River Colne Act 1812 (52 Geo. 3. c. xxx))
Buckinghamshire Roads (No. 2) Act 1741 (repealed)	15 Geo. 2. c. 6	15 April 1742
An Act for enlarging the Term and Powers granted by Two Acts of Parliament; One, of the Eighth Year of the Reign of Her late Majesty Queen Anne; (Note: Northampton Highways Act 1709 (8 Ann. c. 9)) and the other, of the Ninth Year of the Reign of His late Majesty King George the First; (Note: Buckinghamshire Highways Act 1722 (9 Geo. 1. c. 13)) for repairing the Highways between the House commonly called The Horseshoe House, in the Parish of Stoke Goldington, in the County of Bucks, and the Town of Northampton, and the Road from The North Bridge of Newport Pagnel, in the County of Bucks, to The Horseshoe House. (Repealed by Newport Pagnell Roads Act 1797 (37 Geo. 3. c. 177))
Worcester and Warwick Roads Act 1741 (repealed)	15 Geo. 2. c. 7	15 April 1742
An Act for enlarging the Term and Powers granted by an Act passed in the Thirteenth Year of the Reign of His late Majesty King George the First, intituled, "An Act for repairing the Roads leading from the Town of Bromsgrove to the Town of Dudley, in the County of Worcester, and from the said Town of Bromsgrove to the Town of Birmingham, in the County of Warwick," (Note: Bromsgrove and Birmingham Roads Act 1726 (13 Geo. 1. c. 15)) so far as the said Act relates to the repairing the Roads leading from the Town of Dudley to the Town of Bromsgrove, in the County of Worcester; and for making the same more effectual. (Repealed by Road from Bromsgrove to Dudley Act 1816 (56 Geo. 3. c. lxvii) and Dudley, Halesowen and Bromsgrove Road Act 1854 (17 & 18 Vict. c. cv))
Kirkcaldy Beer Duties Act 1741 (repealed)	15 Geo. 2. c. 8	15 April 1742
An Act for laying a Duty of Two Pennies Scots, or One Sixth Part of a Penny Sterling, upon every Scots Pint of Ale and Beer, which shall be brewed for Sale, brought into, tapped, or sold, within the Town of Kircaldy, and Liberties thereof. (Repealed by Statute Law Revision Act 1948 (11 & 12 Geo. 6. c. 62))
Middlesex Roads Act 1741 (repealed)	15 Geo. 2. c. 9	15 April 1742
An Act for enlarging the Term and Powers granted by Two Acts of Parliament, One of the First, (Note: Repair of Highways between Tyburn and Uxbridge Act 1715 (1 Geo. 1. St. 2. c. 25 Pr.)) and the other of the Twelfth, (Note: Tyburn and Uxbridge Road Act 1725 (12 Geo. 1. c. 17)) Year of the Reign of His late Majesty King George the First, for repairing the Highways between Tyburn and Uxbridge, in the County of Middlesex; and for amending the Road leading from Brent Bridge, over Hanwell Heath, through the Parishes of Hanwell, New Brentford, and Ealing, to the great Western Road, in the said County. (Repealed by Roads between Tyburn and Uxbridge Act 1826 (7 Geo. 4. c. lxxvi))
Hull (Poor Relief) Act 1741 (repealed)	15 Geo. 2. c. 10	15 April 1742
An Act for explaining, amending, and making more effectual, Two Acts of Parliament; One, passed in the Ninth and Tenth Years of the Reign of His late Majesty King William the Third, (Note: Kingston-upon-Hull Workhouse Act 1697 (9 & 10 Will. 3. c. 47 Pr.)) for erecting Workhouses, and Houses of Correction, in the Town of Kingston upon Hull, for the Employment and Maintenance of the Poor there; and the other, passed in the Eighth Year of the Reign of Her late Majesty Queen Anne, (Note: Poor Law (Hull) Act 1709 (8 Ann. c. 24)) for the more effectual Provision of the Poor in the said Town. (Repealed by Hull Poor Relief Act 1824 (5 Geo. 4. c. xiii))
Land Tax Act 1741 (repealed)	15 Geo. 2. c. 11	15 April 1742
An Act for granting an Aid to His Majesty, by a Land Tax, to be raised in Great Britain, for the Service of the Year One Thousand Seven Hundred and Forty-two. (Repealed by Statute Law Revision Act 1867 (30 & 31 Vict. c. 59))
Saint Catherine Coleman Act 1741 (repealed)	15 Geo. 2. c. 12	15 April 1742
An Act to explain and amend an Act passed in the Twelfth Year of His present Majesty's Reign, intituled, "An Act to enable the Parishioners of Saint Catherine Coleman, in Fenchurch Street, in the City of London, to re-build the Church of the said Parish;" (Note: Saint Catherine Coleman Act 1738 (12 Geo. 2. c. 17)) and for making the said Act more effectual for the Purposes thereby intended. (Repealed by Statute Law (Repeals) Act 2013 (c. 2))
Bank of England Act 1741 (repealed)	15 Geo. 2. c. 13	16 June 1742
An Act for establishing an Agreement with the Governor and Company of the Bank of England, for advancing the Sum of One Million Six Hundred Thousand Pounds, towards the Supply for the Service of the Year One Thousand Seven Hundred and Forty-two. (Repealed by Statute Law (Repeals) Act 1973 (c. 39))
Hampshire Roads Act 1741 (repealed)	15 Geo. 2. c. 14	16 June 1742
An Act to explain and amend Two Acts of Parliament; one, made in the Ninth Year of the Reign of Her late Majesty Queen Anne, intituled, "An Act for repairing the Highways from Sheet Bridge, in the Parish of Petersfield, to the Town of Portsmouth, in the County of Southampton;" (Note: Petersfield Highways Act 1710 (9 Ann. c. 33)) and another Act, made in the Twelfth Year of the Reign of His late Majesty King George the First, (Note: Petersfield to Portsmouth Road Act 1725 (12 Geo. 1. c. 19)) for enlarging the Term in and by the said Act granted, and for other Purposes therein mentioned; and for enlarging the Term and Powers by the said last mentioned Act granted. (Repealed by Southampton Roads Act 1772 (12 Geo. 3. c. 108))
Gloucestershire Roads Act 1741 (repealed)	15 Geo. 2. c. 15	16 June 1742
An Act for enlarging the Term and Powers granted by an Act passed in the Thirteenth Year of the Reign of His late Majesty King George the First, intituled, "An Act for repairing the Roads leading from Cirencester Town's End, to Saint John's Bridge, in the County of Gloucester." (Note: Cirencester Roads Act 1726 (13 Geo. 1. c. 11)) (Repealed by Cirencester Roads Act 1825 (6 Geo. 4. c. cxliii))
Cambridgeshire Roads Act 1741 (repealed)	15 Geo. 2. c. 16	16 June 1742
An Act for continuing the Powers granted by Three several Acts of Parliament; one, (Note: Cambridge Roads Act 1723 (10 Geo. 1. c. 12)) for repairing the Road from Stump Cross to Newmarket Heath, and the Town of Cambridge; another, (Note: Cambridge Roads Act 1724 (11 Geo. 1. c. 14)) for repairing the Road from Foulmire to Cambridge; and the Third, (Note: Cambridge Roads Act 1729 (3 Geo. 2. c. 37)) for explaining, amending, and rendering more effectual, the said Two former Acts; and for enlarging the Terms granted by the said Two former Acts. (Repealed by Louth Roads Act 1780 (20 Geo. 3. c. 94))
Herefordshire Roads Act 1741 (repealed)	15 Geo. 2. c. 17	16 June 1742
An Act for enlarging the Term and Powers granted by an Act passed in the Seventh Year of the Reign of His late Majesty King George the First, (Note: Ledbury Highways Act 1720 (7 Geo. 1. St. 1. c. 23)) for repairing the several Roads, leading from the Town of Ledbury, in the County of Hereford, to the several Places therein mentioned; and for making the said Act more effectual. (Repealed by Hereford and Gloucester Roads Act 1789 (29 Geo. 3. c. 104))
Colchester (Poor Law Authority) Act 1741 (repealed)	15 Geo. 2. c. 18	16 June 1742
An Act to render more effectual an Act, made in the Ninth and Tenth Years of the Reign of His late Majesty King William the Third, intituled, "An Act for erecting Hospitals and Work-houses within the Town of Colchester, in the County of Essex, for the better employing and maintaining the Poor thereof." (Note: Colchester Workhouse Act 1697 (9 & 10 Will. 3. c. 37 Pr.)) (Repealed by Statute Law Revision Act 1950 (14 Geo. 6. c. 6))
National Debt Act 1741 (repealed)	15 Geo. 2. c. 19	16 June 1742
An Act for granting to His Majesty the Sum of Eight Hundred Thousand Pounds, to be raised by Annuities transferrable at the Bank of England; and for ascertaining the Customs and Duties upon Quicksilver, taken as Prize during the present War; and for the further appropriating the Supplies granted in this Session of Parliament. (Repealed by Statute Law Revision Act 1870 (33 & 34 Vict. c. 69))
Gold and Silver Thread Act 1741 (repealed)	15 Geo. 2. c. 20	16 June 1742
An Act to prevent the counterfeiting of Gold and Silver Lace; and for settling and adjusting the Proportions of fine Silver and Silk; and for the better making of Gold and Silver Thread. (Repealed by Hallmarking Act 1973 (c. 43))
Indemnity Act 1741 (repealed)	15 Geo. 2. c. 21	16 June 1742
An Act to indemnify Persons, who have omitted to qualify themselves for Offices, Employments, and Promotions, within the Time limited by Law; and for allowing further Time for that Purpose. (Repealed by Statute Law Revision Act 1867 (30 & 31 Vict. c. 59))
House of Commons Disqualification Act 1741 or the Place Act 1742 (repealed)	15 Geo. 2. c. 22	16 June 1742
An Act to exclude certain Officers from being Members of the House of Commons. (Repealed by House of Commons Disqualification Act 1957 (5 & 6 Eliz. 2. c. 20))
Byron's Shorthand Act 1741 (repealed)	15 Geo. 2. c. 23	16 June 1742
An Act for securing to John Byron Master of Arts the sole Right of publishing, for a certain Term of Years, the Art and Method of Short Hand invented by him. (Repealed by Statute Law Revision Act 1948 (11 & 12 Geo. 6. c. 62))
Justices Commitment Act 1741 (repealed)	15 Geo. 2. c. 24	16 June 1742
An Act to empower the Justices of the Peace of a Liberty or Corporation to commit Offenders to the House of Correction of the County, Riding, or Division, in which such Liberty or Corporation is situate. (Repealed by Criminal Justice Administration Act 1914 (4 & 5 Geo. 5. c. 58))
Spirit Duties, etc. Act 1741 (repealed)	15 Geo. 2. c. 25	15 July 1742
An Act to impower the Importers or Proprietors of Rum or Spirits of the British Sugar Plantations to land the same before Payment of the Duties of Excise charged thereon, and to lodge the same in Warehouses at their own Expence; and for the Relief of Ralph Barrow, in respect to the Duty on some Rock Salt, lost by the overflowing of the Rivers Weaver and Dane. (Repealed by Statute Law Revision Act 1867 (30 & 31 Vict. c. 59))
Westminster Bridge Act 1741 (repealed)	15 Geo. 2. c. 26	15 July 1742
An Act for the better enabling the Commissioners for building a Bridge cross the River Thames, from the City of Westminster to the opposite Shore in the County of Surrey, to finish the said Bridge, and to perform the other Trusts reposed in them; and for enlarging the Time for exchanging of Tickets unclaimed in the last Lottery for the said Bridge, and to make Provision for Tickets in the said Lottery, lost, burnt, or otherwise destroyed. (Repealed by Westminster Bridge Act 1853 (16 & 17 Vict. c. 46))
Thefts of Cloth, etc. Act 1741 (repealed)	15 Geo. 2. c. 27	15 July 1742
An Act for the more effectual preventing any Cloth or Woollen Goods remaining upon the Rack or Tenters, or any Woollen Yarn or Wool left out to dry, from being stolen or taken away in the Nighttime. (Repealed by Master and Servant Act 1889 (52 & 53 Vict. c. 24))
Counterfeiting Coin Act 1741 (repealed)	15 Geo. 2. c. 28	15 July 1742
An Act for the more effectual preventing the counterfeiting of the current Coin of this Kingdom, and the uttering or paying of false or counterfeit Coin. (Repealed by Coinage Offences Act 1832 (2 & 3 Will. 4. c. 34))
Duties on Foreign Cambrics, etc. Act 1741 (repealed)	15 Geo. 2. c. 29	15 July 1742
An Act for granting to His Majesty an additional Duty on Foreign Cambricks imported into Great Britain; and for allowing thereout a Bounty upon certain Species of British and Irish Linens exported. (Repealed by Statute Law Revision Act 1867 (30 & 31 Vict. c. 59))
Marriage of Lunatics Act 1741 (repealed)	15 Geo. 2. c. 30	15 July 1742
An Act to prevent the Marriage of Lunaticks. (Repealed by Statute Law Revision Act 1873 (36 & 37 Vict. c. 91))
Plantation Trade, etc. Act 1741 (repealed)	15 Geo. 2. c. 31	15 July 1742
An Act for further regulating the Plantation Trade, and for Relief of Merchants importing Prize Goods from America, and for preventing collusive Captures there; and for obliging the Claimers of Vessels seized for Exportation of Wool, or any unlawful Importation, to give Security for Costs; and for allowing East India Goods to be taken out of Warehouses, in order to be cleaned and refreshed. (Repealed by Statute Law Revision Act 1867 (30 & 31 Vict. c. 59))
Keeping of Gunpowder Act 1741 (repealed)	15 Geo. 2. c. 32	15 July 1742
An Act for preventing the Mischiefs which may happen, by keeping dangerous Quantities of Gunpowder in or near the Cities of London and Westminster. (Repealed by Keeping, etc., of Gunpowder Act 1771 (11 Geo. 3. c. 35))
Starr and Bent Act 1741 (repealed)	15 Geo. 2. c. 33	15 July 1742
An Act to revive several Acts, for the Punishment of Persons destroying Turnpikes or Locks, or other Works erected by Authority of Parliament, and for other Purposes therein mentioned; and to continue several Acts, relating to Rice, to Frauds in the Customs, to the clandestine Running of Goods, and to Copper Ore of the British Plantations; and for extending the Liberty given by the Act of the Twelfth Year of the Reign of His present Majesty, (Note: Colonial Trade Act 1738 (12 Geo. 2. c. 30)) for carrying Sugar of the Growth of the British Sugar Colonies in America, to Ships belonging to any of His Majesty's Subjects residing in Great Britain, and navigated according to Law; and for the more effectual preventing the cutting of Star or Bent. (Note: Ammophila: known as marram grass, beach grass, starr grass or bent grass.) (Repealed by Theft Act 1968 (c. 60))
Cattle Stealing Act 1741 (repealed)	15 Geo. 2. c. 34	15 July 1742
An Act to explain an Act made in the Fourteenth Year of the Reign of His present Majesty, intituled, "An Act to render the Laws more effectual, for preventing the stealing and destroying of Sheep and other Cattle." (Note: Cattle Stealing Act 1740 (14 Geo. 2. c. 6)) (Repealed for England and Wales by Criminal Statutes Repeal Act 1827 (7 & 8 Geo. 4. c. 27) and for India by Criminal Law (India) Act 1828 (9 Geo. 4. c. 74))
Making of Sail Cloth, etc. Act 1741 (repealed)	15 Geo. 2. c. 35	15 July 1742
An Act to continue several Laws, for the Encouragement of the making of Sail Cloth in Great Britain, and of the Silk Manufactures of this Kingdom; and for allowing a Drawback on the Exportation of Copper Bars; and to explain a Clause of an Act made in the last Session of Parliament, (Note: Exportation Act 1740 (14 Geo. 2. c. 3)) to prohibit the Exportation of Corn, and other Things therein mentioned; and to give further Time for the Payment of Duties omitted to be paid for the Indentures and Contracts of Clerks and Apprentices. (Repealed by Statute Law Revision Act 1867 (30 & 31 Vict. c. 59))

=== Private acts ===
Short title	Citation	Royal assent
Long title
Popham's Name Act 1741	15 Geo. 2. c. 1 Pr.	3 February 1742
An Act to enable Alexander Popham Esquire, and his Heirs, to take and use the Surname of Luscombe, according to the Direction of the last Will and Testament of Richard Luscombe Esquire, deceased.
Gohl's Naturalization Act 1741	15 Geo. 2. c. 2 Pr.	3 February 1742
An Act for naturalizing John Christoph Gohl and Hans Bardewieck and others.
Earl Godolphin's, &c. Estate Act 1741	15 Geo. 2. c. 3 Pr.	16 March 1742
An Act for confirming and establishing certain Articles of Agreement, and an Indenture, between the Right Honourable Francis Earl Godolphin and the Dean and Chapter of Ely, for making a Partition and Division of a certain Heath, or Heath-ground, in the County of Cambridge; and for rendering the same Agreement and Indenture more effectual for the Purposes therein mentioned.
Orkney and Shetland Act 1741	15 Geo. 2. c. 4 Pr.	16 March 1742
An Act for dissolving and disannexing from the Crown, and the Patrimony thereof, the Earldom of Orkney and Lordship of Zetland; and for vesting the same irredeemably in James Earl of Morton and his Heirs, discharged from any Power or Right of Redemption in His Majesty, His Heirs or Successors.
Lord Montfort's Estate Act 1741	15 Geo. 2. c. 5 Pr.	16 March 1742
An Act for vesting the settled Estate of Henry Lord Montfort, in the County of Worcester, in Trustees, in Trust, to sell the same; and to lay out and apply the Money arising by such Sale, in the Purchase of Lands and Hereditaments in the Counties of Cambridge and Suffolk, or One of them.
Prendergast's Estates Act 1741	15 Geo. 2. c. 6 Pr.	16 March 1742
An Act for explaining a Clause contained in an Act, made in the Eleventh and Twelfth Years of the Reign of His late Majesty King William the Third, intituled, "An Act for granting an Aid to His Majesty, by Sale of the forfeited and other Estates and Interests in Ireland, and by a Land Tax in England, for the several Purposes therein mentioned," (Note: Crown Lands (Forfeited Estates) Act 1698 (11 Will. 3. c. 2)) whereby several Grants, made by His Majesty to Sir Thomas Prendergast Baronet, deceased, of several Lands, Tenements, and Hereditaments, Part of the said forfeited Estates and Interests in Ireland, were ratified and confirmed.
Dormer's Name Act 1741	15 Geo. 2. c. 7 Pr.	16 March 1742
An Act to enable Sir Clement Cottrell Knight, and other the Devisees of the Real Estate of Lieutenant General James Dormer, deceased, to take and use the Surname of Dormer, pursuant and according to the Tenor and Purport of the Will of the said James Dormer.
Pigott's Wills, &c. Act 1741	15 Geo. 2. c. 8 Pr.	16 March 1742
An Act for making the Exemplification of the last Wills of John Pigott the Elder, late of Brockley, in the County of Somerset, Esquire, and of John Pigott Esquire his Son, Evidence in all Courts of Law and Equity in Great Britain and Ireland; and to enable John Biggs Pigott Esquire, formerly called John Biggs, and his Progeny and Descendants, to take and use the Surname and Arms of Pigott only, pursuant to the Will of the said John Pigott the Son.
Rolle's Name Act 1741	15 Geo. 2. c. 9 Pr.	16 March 1742
An Act to enable John Rolle Esquire and his Heirs to take and use the Surname and Arms of Walter, according to the Direction of the last Will and Testament of Sir Robert Walter Baronet, deceased.
Bluett's Name Act 1741	15 Geo. 2. c. 10 Pr.	16 March 1742
An Act to enable Buckland Bluett Esquire and his Heirs to take and use the Name of Nutcombe, according to the Settlement made by Richard Nutcombe Esquire, deceased.
Boucher's Naturalization Act 1741	15 Geo. 2. c. 11 Pr.	16 March 1742
An Act for naturalizing John Boucher.
Duque'ruy's Naturalization Act 1741	15 Geo. 2. c. 12 Pr.	16 March 1742
An Act for naturalizing Isaac Nicholas Duqueray, Michael Henry Duqueray, and others.
Yorke's Estate Act 1741	15 Geo. 2. c. 13 Pr.	15 April 1742
An Act for the more effectually carrying into Execution certain Articles of Agreement, made before, and in Consideration, of the Marriage of the Honourable Philip Yorke Esquire, with the most Honourable Jemima Marchioness Grey; and for other Purposes therein mentioned.
Warren's Sluice through Stockport Glebe Act 1741	15 Geo. 2. c. 14 Pr.	15 April 1742
An Act to enable George Warren Esquire, his Heirs and Assigns, to make a Sluice, or Tunnel, through Part of the Glebe belonging to the Rectory of Stockport, in the County of Chester; and to use and enjoy the same, for conveying Water to Stockport Mills.
Meredith's Estate Act 1741	15 Geo. 2. c. 15 Pr.	15 April 1742
An Act for making Articles of Agreement, entered into by Amos Meredith Esquire and Johanna his Wife, as well in her own Behalf as in Behalf of their Seven Children, all Infants, and by Thomas Asheton Esquire, in Behalf of his Son, an Infant, touching the Partition of the Estate of Robert Cholmondeley, late of Holford, in the County of Chester, Esquire, deceased, now remaining unsold, obligatory on the said Infants; and rendering the said Partition effectual and binding to all Parties.
Leigh Tythes, &c. Act 1741	15 Geo. 2. c. 16 Pr.	15 April 1742
An Act to establish and confirm Articles of Agreement, relating to the Tithes and certain Glebe Lands, within the Parish of Leigh, in the County of Worcester.
Wyndham's Name Act 1741	15 Geo. 2. c. 17 Pr.	15 April 1742
An Act to enable Percy Wyndham Esquire, and other the Devisees of Henry Earl of Thomond and Viscount Tadcaster, deceased, to take and use the Surname of Obrien, pursuant to the Will of the said Earl of Thomond and Viscount Tadcaster.
Morden's Name Act 1741	15 Geo. 2. c. 18 Pr.	15 April 1742
An Act for enabling William Morden Esquire and his Heirs Male to take and use the Surname and Arms of Harbord, pursuant to the Desire of Harbord Harbord Esquire, deceased.
Earl of Anglesey's Will Act 1741	15 Geo. 2. c. 19 Pr.	15 April 1742
An Act for exemplifying the last Will of Arthur late Earl of Anglesey, and for making the same Evidence in all Courts of Law and Equity in Great Britain and Ireland.
Beaufort's, &c. Naturalization Act 1741	15 Geo. 2. c. 20 Pr.	15 April 1742
An Act for naturalizing Daniel Beaufort, John Girardot de Chancourt, and John Cahuac.
Duke of Grafton's Estate Act 1741	15 Geo. 2. c. 21 Pr.	16 June 1742
An Act for Sale of certain Pieces or Parcels of Ground, Messuages, and Buildings, at Park Place, in the Parish of Saint James, in the County of Middlesex, Part of the settled Estate of Charles Duke of Grafton; and for settling other Lands to the same Uses, in Lieu thereof.
Duke of Leeds' Estate Act 1741	15 Geo. 2. c. 22 Pr.	16 June 1742
An Act for repealing a Power in the Marriage Settlement of Thomas Duke of Leeds with Mary his now Wife, and for creating a new Power instead thereof; and for other Purposes therein mentioned.
Horne's Estate Act 1741	15 Geo. 2. c. 23 Pr.	16 June 1742
An Act for the Sale of Two Closes of Meadow Ground, in West Harnham, in the County of Wilts, being the settled Estate of John Horne, to Henry Earl of Pembroke and his Heirs; and for laying out the Money arising by such Sale in the Purchase of another Estate, to be settled in Lieu thereof.
Earl of Carlisle's Estate Act 1741	15 Geo. 2. c. 24 Pr.	16 June 1742
An Act to empower Henry Earl of Carlisle to make Leases of Coal Mines and Coal Works, lying within his settled Estates, in the County of Northumberland, for any Term not exceeding Ninety-nine Years.
Earl of Carlingford's Estate Act 1741	15 Geo. 2. c. 25 Pr.	16 June 1742
An Act for vesting all the Manors, Towns, Lands, Chiefries, Fee-farm Rents, and other Hereditaments whatsoever, in the several Counties of Lowth, Meath, and Sligoe, and elsewhere, in the Kingdom of Ireland, late the Estate of Francis Earl of Carlingford, deceased, in Trustees, to be sold, for the Payment of his Debts, and other Purposes therein mentioned.
Viscount Blundell's Estate Act 1741	15 Geo. 2. c. 26 Pr.	16 June 1742
An Act for vesting the several Castles, Manors, Towns, Lands, and Hereditaments, of Mountague Lord Viscount Blundell, in the County of Down, in the Kingdom of Ireland, in Trustees, for raising, after the Death of the said Viscount, the Sum of Ten Thousand Pounds, for the Portion of Mary Lady Raymond his Daughter; and for other Purposes therein mentioned.
Lord Cavendish's Qualification Act 1741	15 Geo. 2. c. 27 Pr.	16 June 1742
An Act to enable James Cavendish Esquire, commonly called Lord James Cavendish, to take, in Great Britain, the Oath of Office, as Auditor General of His Majesty's Revenues in the Kingdom of Ireland, and to qualify himself for the Enjoyment of the said Office.
Brooke's Lunacy Act 1741	15 Geo. 2. c. 28 Pr.	16 June 1742
An Act to prevent Sir Job Brooke Baronet, a Lunatick, from marrying during his Lunacy.
Buck's Estate Act 1741	15 Geo. 2. c. 29 Pr.	16 June 1742
An Act for confirming certain Estates in the County of Hertford, heretofore mortgaged by Sir Charles Buck Baronet, deceased, to the Trustees of Fulke Greville Esquire, during his Minority, to him and his said Trustees, discharged from the Equity of Redemption, which the Infant Son and Heir of the said Sir Charles Buck now hath therein, and in full Satisfaction for Principal and Interest due thereon; and for other Purposes therein mentioned.
Pole's Estate Act 1741	15 Geo. 2. c. 30 Pr.	16 June 1742
An Act to empower the Trustees named in the Will of Sir William Pole Baronet, deceased, to make Leases of Part of his Estate, during the Minority of his Son Sir John Pole.
Walcot's Estate Act 1741	15 Geo. 2. c. 31 Pr.	16 June 1742
An Act for vesting Part of the Marriage Portion of Mary late Wife of John Walcot Esquire, and also Part of his settled Estate, in Trustees, for raising Money, to pay Debts; and for securing an Equivalent for the same, for the Benefit of his Heir Male.
Radcliffe's Estate Act 1741	15 Geo. 2. c. 32 Pr.	16 June 1742
An Act for Sale of several settled Estates of Walter Radcliffe Esquire, lying in the County of Devon; and for laying out the Monies arising from such Sale in the Purchase of other Lands, in the said County of Devon, of equal Value, to be settled to the same Uses, in Lieu thereof.
Knightly's Estate Act 1741	15 Geo. 2. c. 33 Pr.	16 June 1742
An Act for Sale of certain Estates of Valentine Knightley Esquire, in the County of Northampton; and for settling another Estate, in the same County, to the same Uses, in Lieu thereof.
Harvey's Estate Act 1741	15 Geo. 2. c. 34 Pr.	16 June 1742
An Act for vesting the settled Estate of Michael Harvey Esquire, in the County of Leicester, in Trustees, to be sold; and for applying the Money arising by such Sale, for discharging the Encumbrances affecting his Estate in the County of Surrey; and for settling that Estate in Lieu of the Leicestershire Estate, and to the same Uses.
Bentley's Bequest for Charitable Uses Act 1741	15 Geo. 2. c. 35 Pr.	16 June 1742
An Act for confirming a Conveyance from the surviving Trustees of the Charity established by the Will of John Bentley Esquire, deceased, of the undivided Sixth Part of Fickets Field, in the County of Middlesex, to the surviving Assignees under the Commission of Bankruptcy awarded against William Hammond, late of Change Alley, London, Goldsmith and Banker, deceased.
Manual's Estate Act 1741	15 Geo. 2. c. 36 Pr.	16 June 1742
An Act for settling certain Messuages, Lands, and Hereditaments, in Great Driffield, in the County of York, Part of the Estate of James Manuel, late of New Malton, in the same County, deceased, to the Uses mentioned in certain Articles of Agreement, made between the Widow and the Daughters and Coheirs of the said James Manuel.
Lucas' Estate Act 1741	15 Geo. 2. c. 37 Pr.	16 June 1742
An Act for vesting Part of the settled Estate of Robert Lucas Esquire and Mary his Wife in Trustees, to be sold; and for applying Part of the Money arising by such Sale in the Purchase of an Estate contracted for, in order to be settled, together with other Lands of the said Robert Lucas, as an Equivalent for the said settled Estate, and to the like Uses.
Northey's Estate Act 1741	15 Geo. 2. c. 38 Pr.	16 June 1742
An Act to enable William Northey, an Infant, to settle Lands, Tenements, and Hereditaments, in the County of Wilts, for the Benefit of himself and any Woman he shall marry, and their Issue, notwithstanding his Infancy; and for other Purposes therein mentioned.
Wotton Underwood Inclosure Act 1741	15 Geo. 2. c. 39 Pr.	16 June 1742
An Act for dividing and enclosing the Common Fields, Land, Wastes, and Unenclosed Grounds, within the Manor and Parish of Wootton Underwood, in the County of Bucks; and for the making effectual certain Exchanges therein mentioned.
Sutton Inclosure Act 1741	15 Geo. 2. c. 40 Pr.	16 June 1742
An Act for confirming and establishing an Exchange agreed to be made, of certain Lands, in the Parish of Sutton, in the County of Bedford, between Sir Roger Burgoyne Baronet, Lord of the Manor, and Doctor Crane Rector of the Church, of Sutton, in order to promote and facilitate the Enclosure of the Common Fields and Common Grounds in the said Parish; and for securing to the said Rector an Equivalent for his Tithes arising in the said Parish of Sutton.
Dashwood's Name Act 1741	15 Geo. 2. c. 41 Pr.	16 June 1742
An Act to enable John Dashwood and William Payne Esquires, and their respective Issue Male, and other the Devisees of the Estate of John King Doctor in Divinity, deceased, to take and use the Surname of King only, according to the Direction of the Codicil of the Will of the said Doctor King.
Aston-Cantlow Inclosure Act 1741	15 Geo. 2. c. 42 Pr.	16 June 1742
An Act for dividing and enclosing, setting out and allotting, certain Common Fields and Enclosures, within the Manor and Parish of Aston Cantlow, in the County of Warwick.
Walsingham's Estate Act 1741	15 Geo. 2. c. 43 Pr.	15 July 1742
An Act for Sale of the Estates late of James Walsingham Esquire, deceased, lying in the Counties of Surrey, Essex, Norfolk, and Cambridge, for raising Money, to discharge the Encumbrances affecting the same, and other Purposes therein mentioned.
Rolt's Estate Act 1741	15 Geo. 2. c. 44 Pr.	15 July 1742
An Act for Sale of Part of the Estates of Edward Bayntun Rolt Esquire, to raise Money, for the Payment of Debts affecting the same, and of Portions for his Younger Brothers and Sister, charged thereon by the Settlement of their Uncle John Bayntun Esquire, deceased; and for other Purposes therein mentioned.
Hopkins' Name Act 1741	15 Geo. 2. c. 45 Pr.	15 July 1742
An Act to enable John Probyn Esquire, lately called John Hopkins, and his Descendants, to take and use the Surname of Probyn, pursuant to the Will of Sir Edmund Probyn Knight, deceased.
Holston's Naturalization Act 1741	15 Geo. 2. c. 46 Pr.	15 July 1742
An Act for naturalizing Peter Holsten.

=== Sources ===
- Pickering, Danby, ed. (1765). The Statutes at Large. Vol. 18: From the 15th to the 20th Year of King George II. Cambridge: Joseph Bentham – via Internet Archive.
- Pickering, Danby, ed. (1765). The Statutes at Large. Vol. 18: From the 15th to the 20th Year of King George II. Cambridge: Joseph Bentham – via Google Books.
- Journals of the House of Commons. Vol. 24. London: His Majesty's Stationery Office. 1803. pp. 7–335 – via Google Books.
- Chronological Table of and Index to the Statutes. Vol. 1: To the End of the Session 59 Vict. Sess. 2 (1895) (13th ed.). London: Her Majesty's Stationery Office. 1896. p. 107 – via Google Books.

== See also ==
- List of acts of the Parliament of Great Britain
