= Charles Lodowick Cotterell =

English courtier

Sir Charles Lodowick Cotterell (10 August 1654 – 9 July 1710), was an English courtier. (Note: Also spelt Sir Charles Lodowick Cottrell.) He was the author of "Whole life" on Prince George of Denmark.

== Biography ==
Cotterell, the eldest son of Sir Charles Cotterell, was educated at Trinity College, Cambridge, where he took the degree of LL.D.; was incorporated D.C.L. of Oxford on 4 June 1708.

Cotterell succeeded to his father's position as Master of the Ceremonies in 1686. He was knighted on 18 February 1687. He was commissioner of the privy seal in April 1697, and obtained the reversion of his mastership of the ceremonies for his son on 31 January 1699. He was robbed on Hounslow Heath on his way to Windsor on 4 June 1706, and died in July 1710.

== Works ==
On the death of Prince George of Denmark in 1708, Cotterell published a "Whole Life" of that prince as a chapbook. A copy is in the Grenville Library at the British Museum.

== Family ==
Cotterell married (1) Eliza, daughter of Nicholas Burwell of Gray's Inn, and (2) Elizabeth, daughter of Chaloner Chute. His eldest son by his first marriage Clement Cotterell (1686–1758) followed in his grandfather and fathers footsteps and became master of the ceremonies on his father's death.
