= Anne Dormer (letter-writer) =

English letter writer

Anne Dormer (née Cotterell) (c. 1648–1695), was an English letter writer. Anne was the daughter of Sir Charles Cotterell and sister of Elizabeth (or Katherine) who married Sir William Trumbull (who went on diplomatic missions to Paris and Constantinople, and was later Secretary of State). She was the wife of Robert Dormer (1628?–1689) of Rousham House in Oxfordshire, whom she married in 1668. James Dormer (1679–1741) was their son.

Her correspondence with her sister Elizabeth has been used in several recent histories on the domestic concerns of seventeenth-century women and their legal and romantic relationships with men (part of the study of women's history).
