= Charles Cotterell =

English courtier and translator (1615–1701)

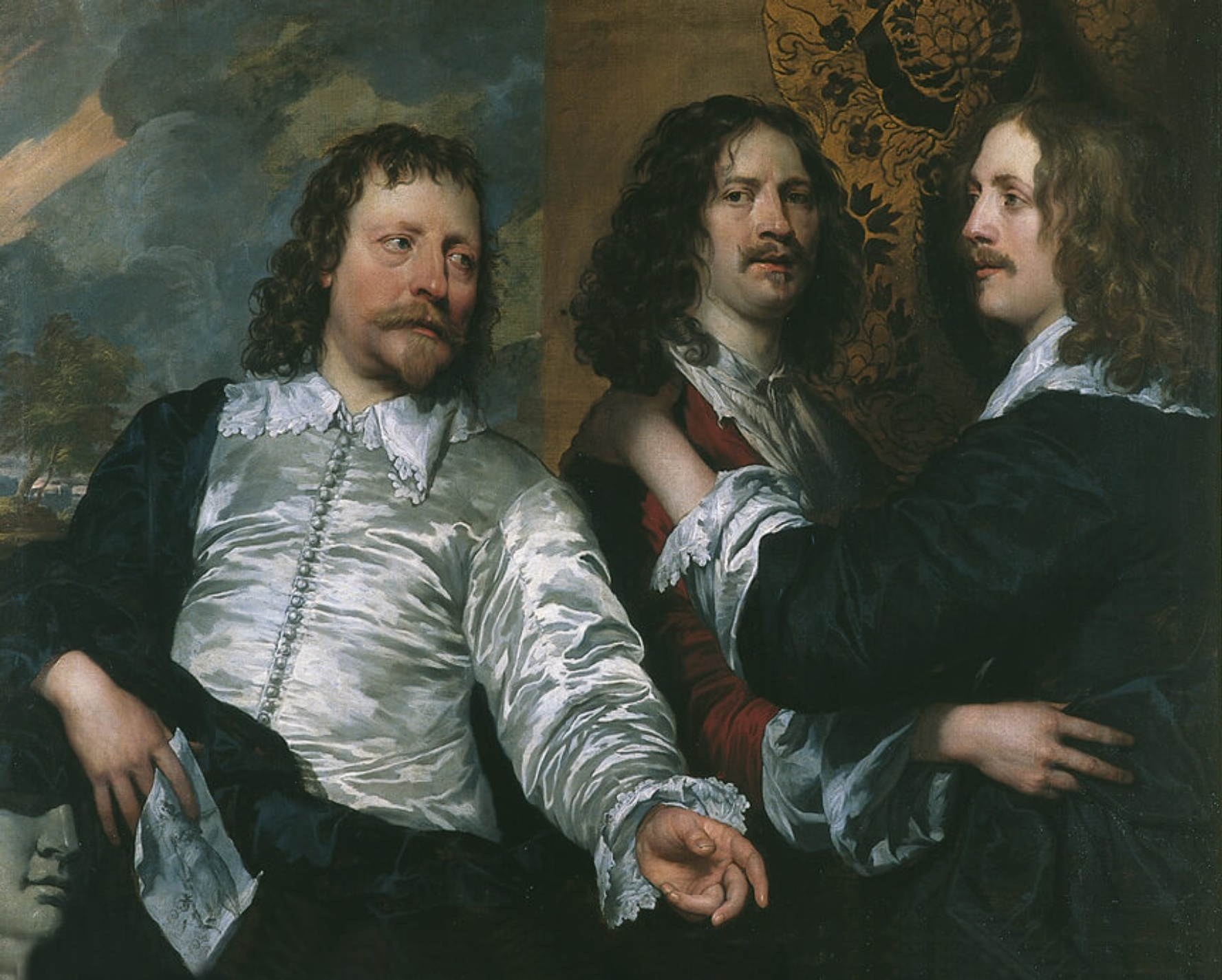
Portrait of the artist, William Dobson, with Nicholas Lanier (left) and Sir Charles Cotterell (right), c 1645.

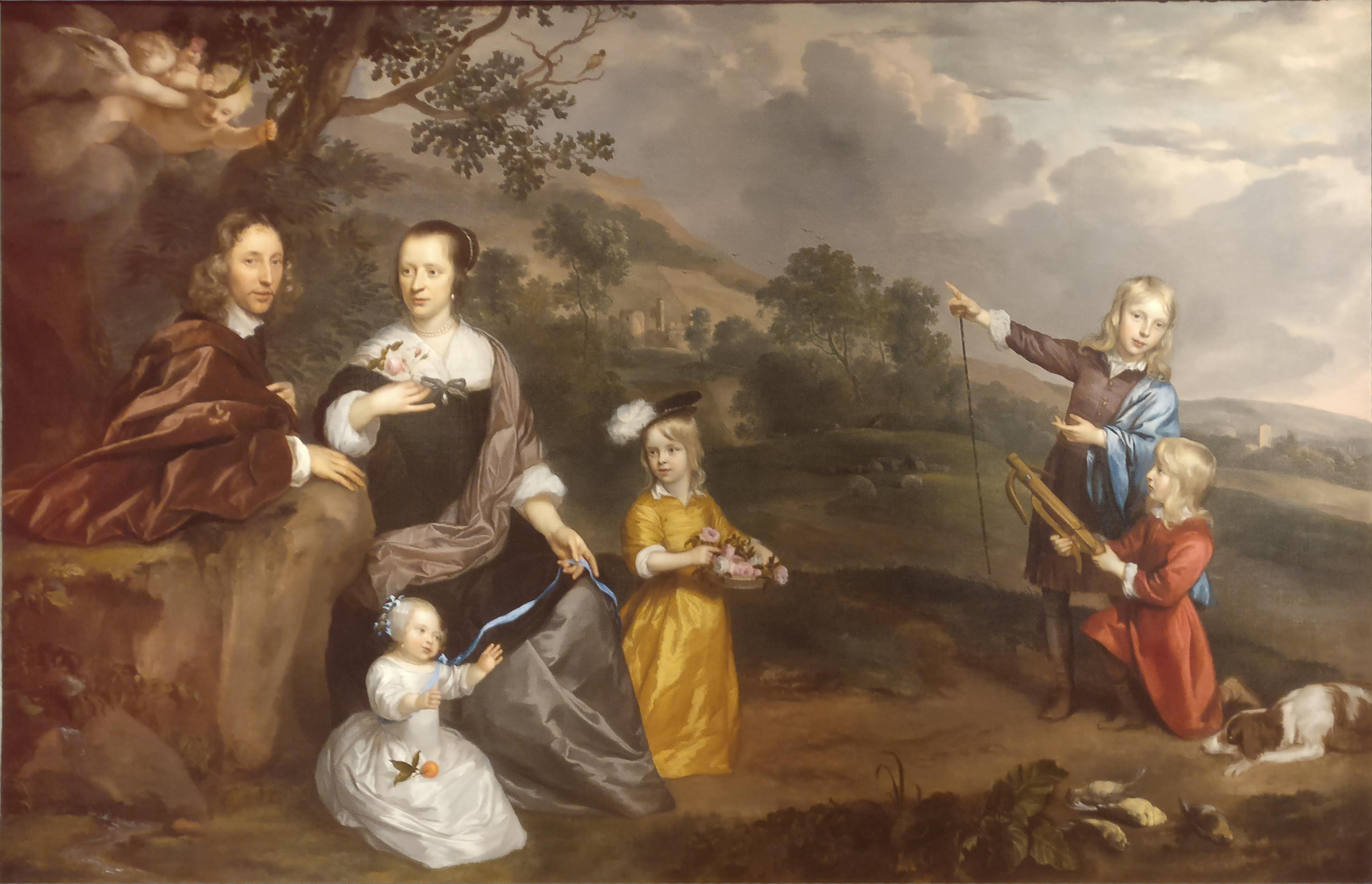
Painted in 1658 by Jan Mytens, the image depicts from left to right: Charles Cotterell (1615–1701), Frances (1614 – c. 1657), Frances (baby), Elizabeth (born 1652), Clement, Charles Lodowick

Sir Charles Cotterell (7 April 1615 – 7 June 1701), was an English courtier and translator (Note: Also spelt Charles Cottrell.) knighted in 1644, after his appointment as master of ceremonies to the court of King Charles I in 1641, a post he held until the execution of Charles in 1649. During the early English Interregnum (1649–1652) he resided in Antwerp. From 1652 until 1654 he was steward at the Hague to Elizabeth, Queen of Bohemia. In 1655 he entered the service of Henry, Duke of Gloucester as secretary, a post he held until the Restoration in 1660. He then served until 1686 as master of ceremonies under Charles II and from 1670 to 1686 as master of requests, while a member of the Cavalier Parliament for Cardigan from 1663 until 1678. He translated French romances and histories and The Spiritual Year, a Spanish devotional tract. He belonged to a group of poets called the Society of Friendship and was literary executive and adviser to one member: Katherine Philips. The group used pseudo-classical, pastoral names, his being Poliarchus.

== Biography ==
Cotterell was born on 7 April 1615 in Wilsford, Lincolnshire, England. He is the son of Sir Clement Cotterell (1585–1631) and Anne Alleyne (d. 1660). Sir Clement was appointed as muster-master of Buckinghamshire in 1616 and groom-porter to James I in 1619, and was knighted in 1620.

Cotterell attended Queens' College, Cambridge in 1629. He completed one more year at university but did not take a degree. In June 1632 he began touring Europe with aristocratic friends. On his second tour the death of Charles of Pembroke resulted in an early return to England and enlistment in Charles's father's service in 1636. Cotterell served the Earl of Pembroke under courtly and military service until knighted in Oxford in 1645.

In Oxford, Cotterell collaborated with William Aylesbury in translating Davila's Storia delle guerre civile at the request of the King. This was published in 1647. In March 1649, after the King's execution, Cotterell, along with his wife and elder daughter, accompanied Aylesbury and the Duke of Buckingham into exile in Antwerp.

By 1652 Cotterell had moved to The Hague as steward to Elizabeth Stuart, Queen of Bohemia, while completing a translation of La Calprenède's Cassandre. After resigning his stewardship in September 1655, Cotterell was appointed an adviser to the Duke of Gloucester, under whom he fought in three campaigns in Flanders.

On 29 May 1660 Cotterell returned with the royal party to London, where he was sworn master of the ceremonies on 5 June. The pursuit of a young widow, Anne Owen, after the death of Frances his wife in 1657, led Cotterell to form a friendship with Katherine Philips, whose husband was the MP for Cardigan. Phillips was a young poet known in her salon as Orinda. Cotterell became a major figure in Orinda's literary circle. She dubbed him Poliarchus, after a character in John Barclay's Argenis.Cotterell later took James Philipps's seat in Parliament.

Sir Charles Cotterell resigned his seat on 27 December 1686 in favour of his son Charles Lodowick. His last years were quiet. He died on 7 June 1701.

== Family ==
In the summer of 1642 Cotterell married Frances (1614 – c. 1657), daughter of Edward West of Marsworth, Buckinghamshire. Their children included:

- Clement, their eldest son, was killed in a naval engagement against the Dutch at the Battle of Solebay in 1672.
- Frances, their first daughter, died young.
- Anne married Robert Dormer, of Rousham, Oxfordshire.
- Elisabeth (or Katherine) (born 1652) their second daughter, married Sir William Trumbull.
- Charles Lodowick (1654–1710) followed his father as Master of the Ceremonies.
