= Rousham =

Village and civil parish in England

Coordinates: 51.913°N 1.303°W

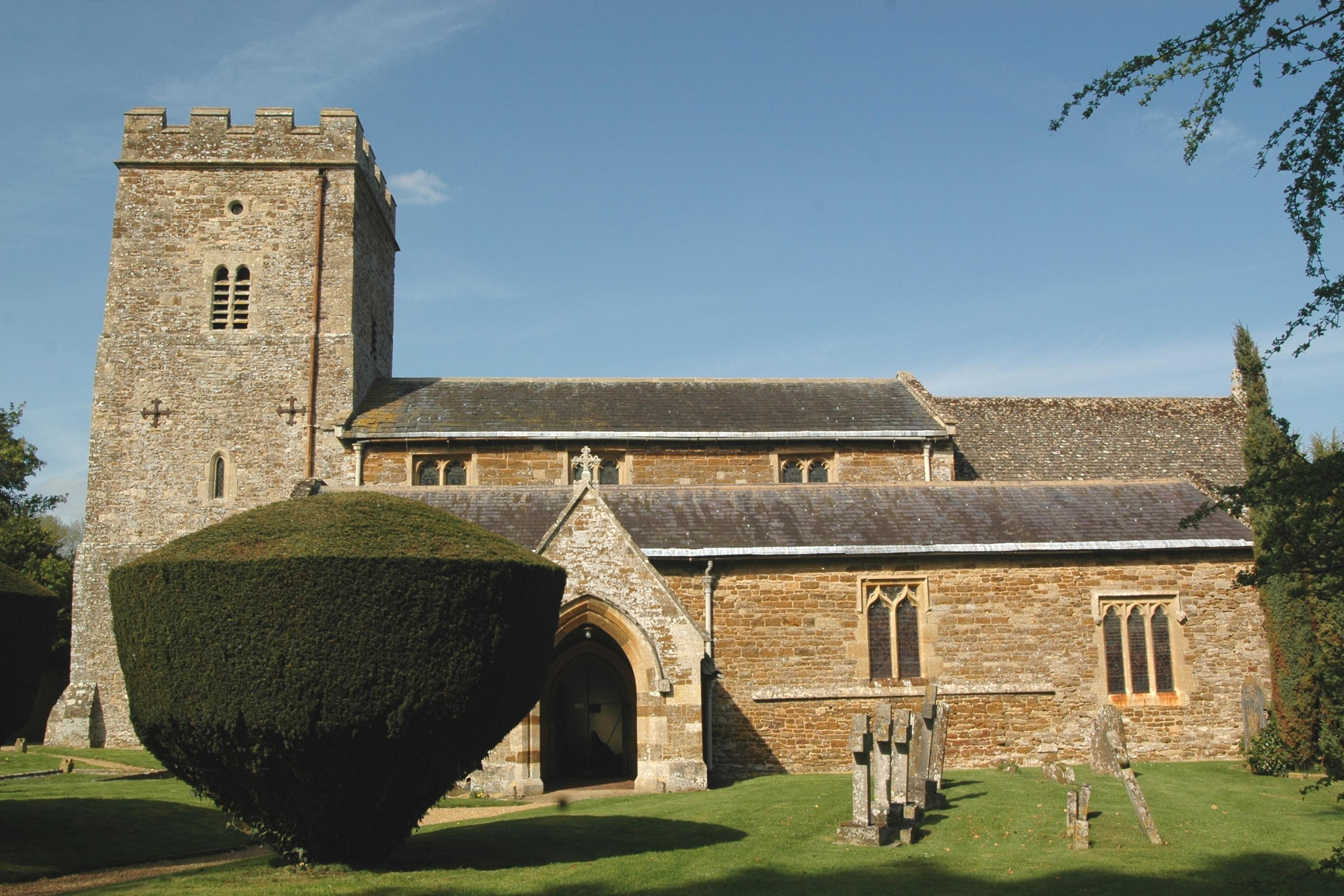
- St Leonard and James parish church

- Location within Oxfordshire
- Population: 80 (2001 Census)
- OS grid reference: SP4824
- District: West Oxfordshire
- Shire county: Oxfordshire
- Region: South East
- Country: England
- Sovereign state: United Kingdom
- Post town: Bicester
- Postcode district: OX25
- Dialling code: 01869
- Police: Thames Valley
- Fire: Oxfordshire
- Ambulance: South Central
- UK Parliament: Bicester and Woodstock

Rousham is a village and civil parish beside the River Cherwell in Oxfordshire. The village is about 6 1/2 miles (10.5 km) west of Bicester and about 6 miles (10 km) north of Kidlington. The parish is bounded by the River Cherwell in the east, the A4260 main road between Oxford and Banbury in the west, partly by the B4030 in the north, and by field boundaries with Tackley parish in the south. The 2001 Census recorded the parish's population as 80. Rousham was founded early in the Anglo-Saxon era. Its toponym is derived from Old English meaning Hrothwulf's ham or farm.

== Manor ==
The Domesday Book records that in 1086 there were two manors at Rousham. The larger belonged to the Norman nobleman Robert D'Oyly and the smaller to his brother in arms Roger d'Ivry. The D'Oyly manor later became part of the honour of Wallingford and in 1279 its overlord was Edmund, 2nd Earl of Cornwall. The latest known records of Rousham remaining in the Honour of Wallingford are from the 15th century. The d'Ivry family line died out in 1215 and the d'Ivry manor at Rousham became part of the Honour of St. Valery. In 1237 Henry III granted the d'Ivry manor at Rousham to Richard, 1st Earl of Cornwall and in 1279 it, like the D'Oyly manor, was held by Richard's son Edmund, 2nd Earl of Cornwall.

== Rousham House ==
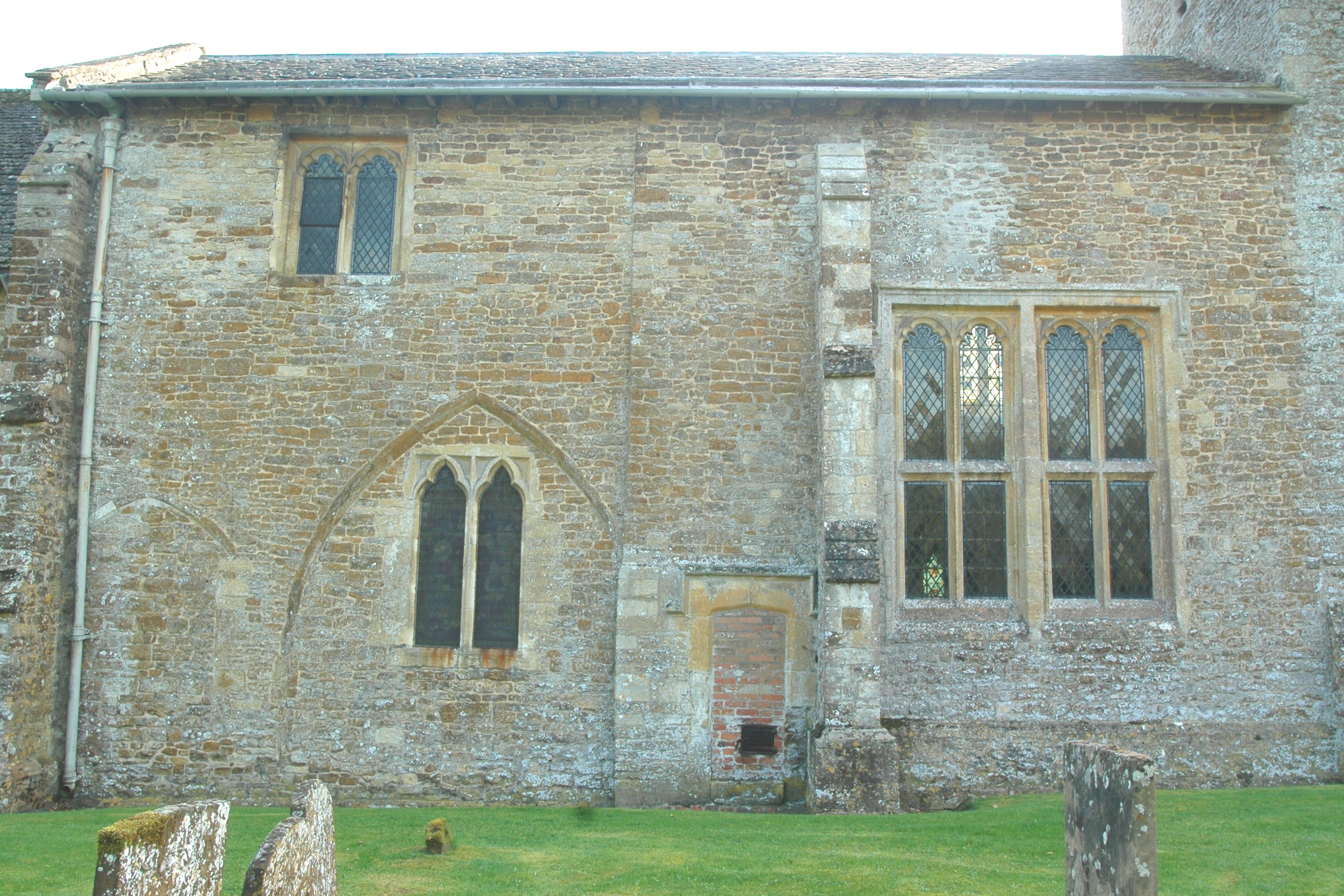
North wall of the nave of SS Leonard and James', showing large 16th-century window and blocked arch to former 14th-century chantry chapel

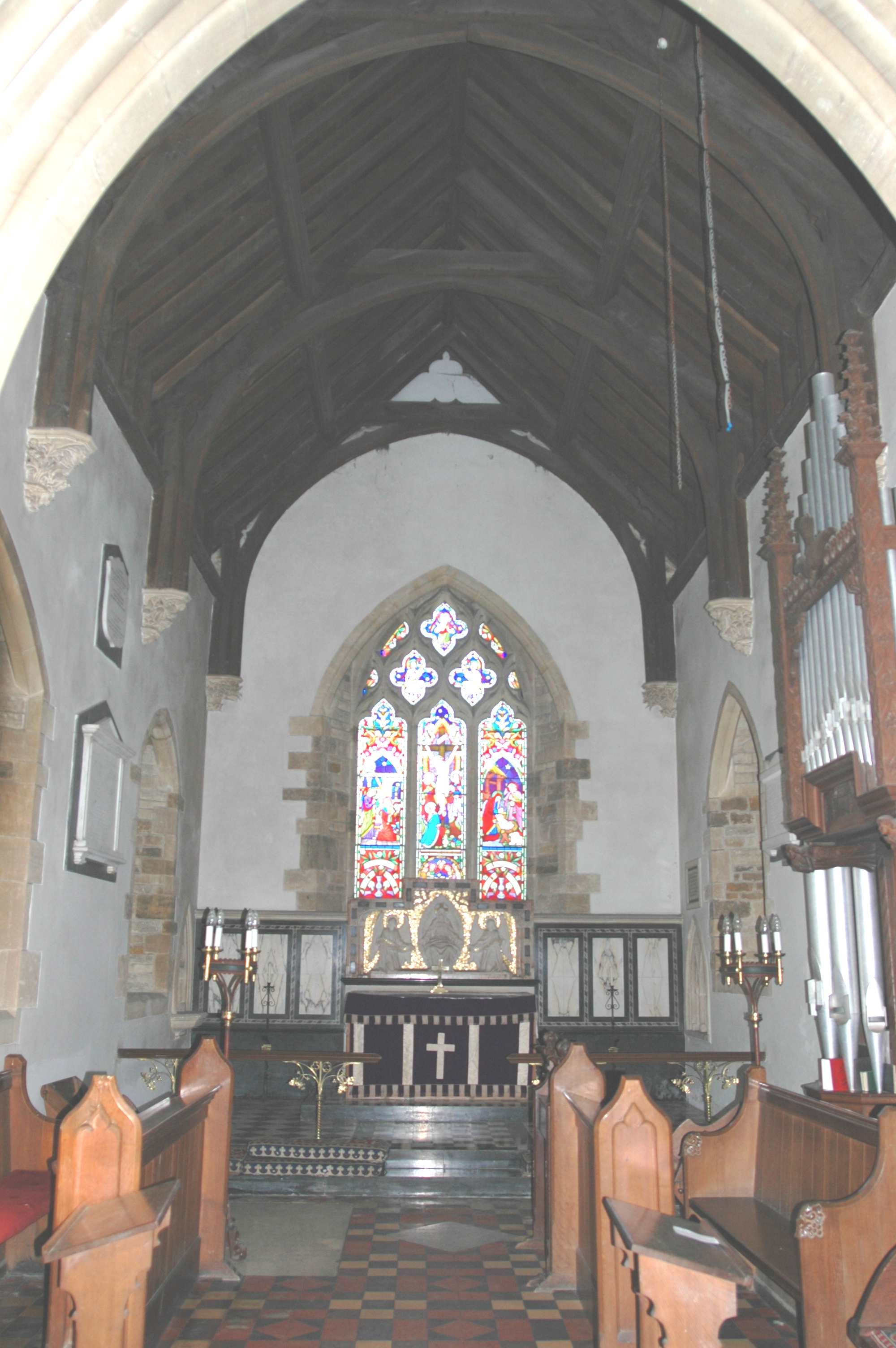
Late 12th-century chancel of SS Leonard & James', restored and altered in 1867–68

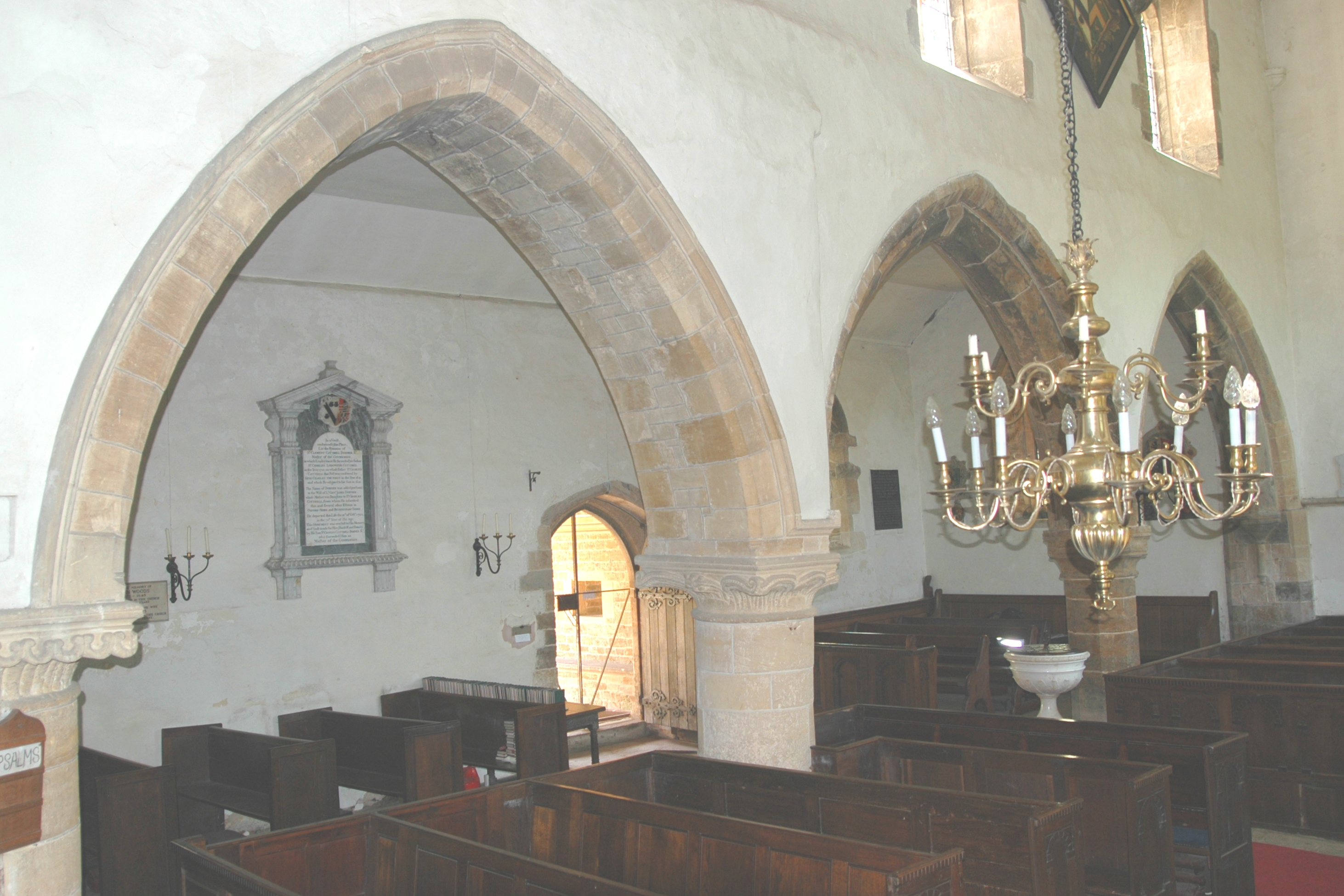
South aisle of SS Leonard & James': east arch (left) late 12th century; middle and west arches early 13th century

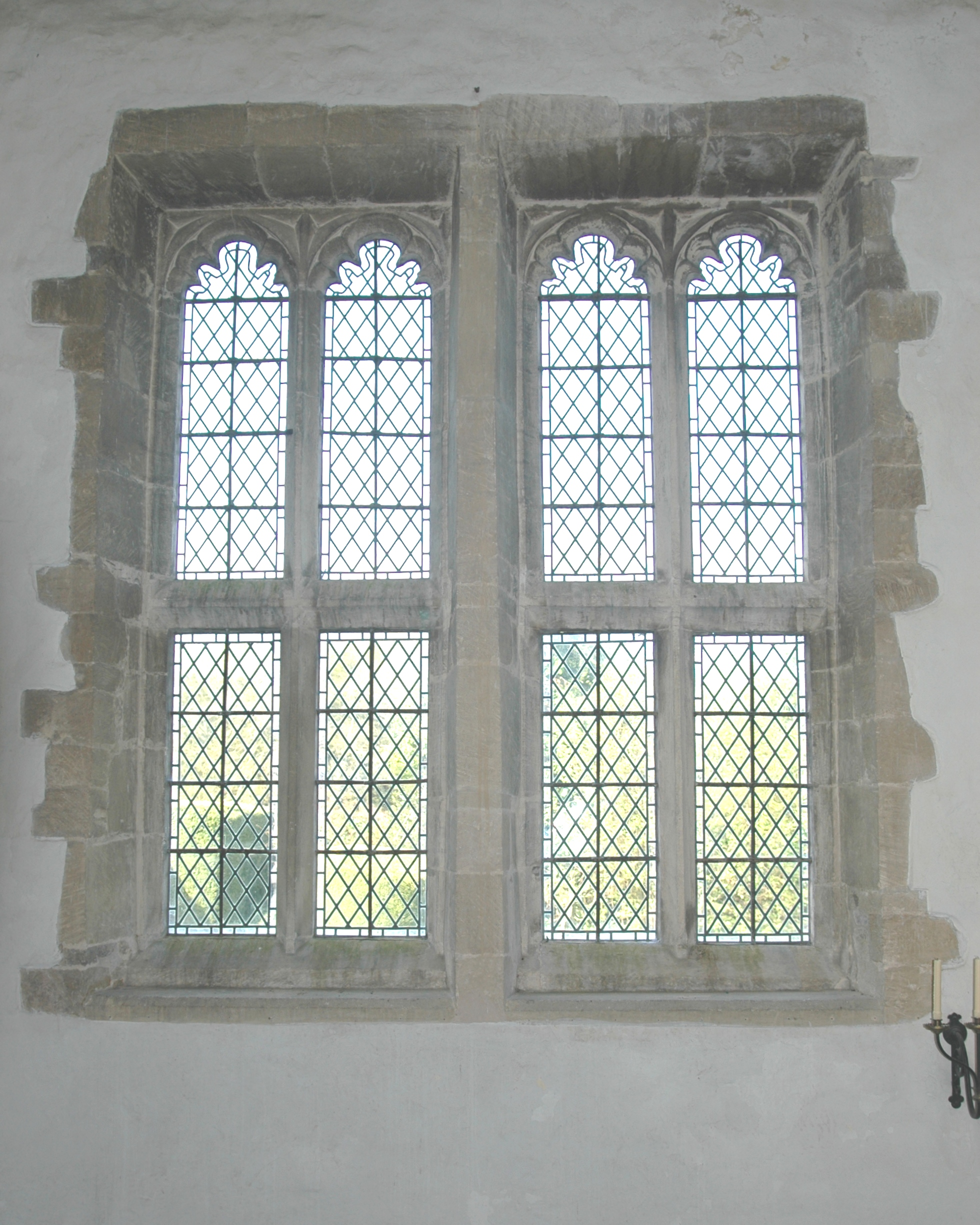
SS Leonard & James': early 16th-century Perpendicular Gothic large window in the north wall of the nave

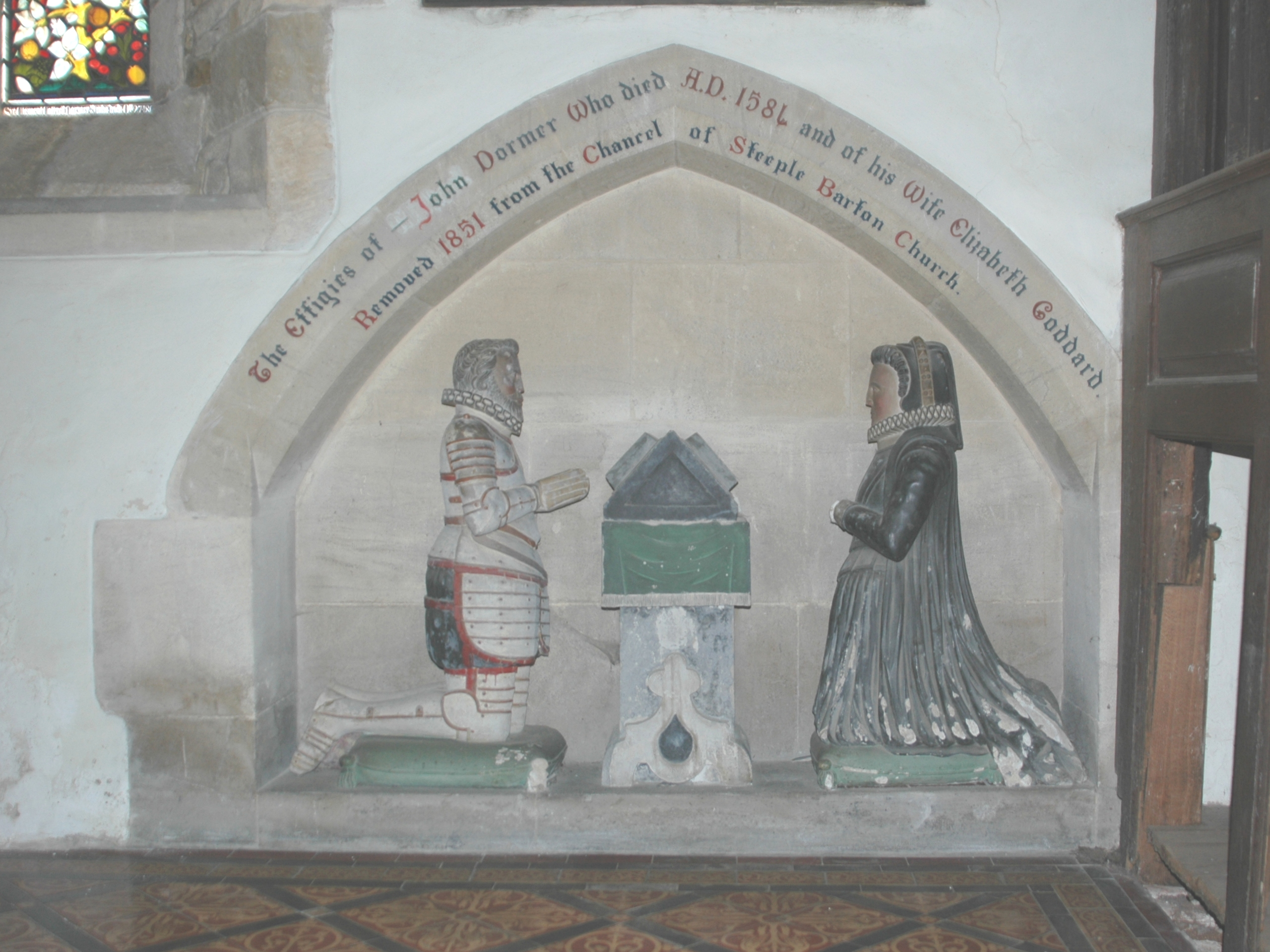
Monument to John Dormer (died 1581) and his wife Elizabeth, originally erected in St. Mary the Virgin, Steeple Barton but brought to Rousham and installed in the chancel here in 1851

== Parish church ==
The earliest known dedication of the Church of England parish church was to Saint Germanus of Auxerre, recorded in 1328. A "German's Well" recorded in the parish in 1626 refers to St Germanus. By 1846 the church had been rededicated to Saint Mary and by 1864 it had been changed again to Saint James. The present dedication of Saint Leonard and Saint James dates from 1904.

The church building dates from the 12th century. The easternmost bay of the arcade for the south aisle was built in about 1180 and the bell tower was added early in the 13th century. Between 1296 and 1316 a chantry chapel was added to the north side of the nave. Slightly later the south aisle was extended the full length of the nave, a south chapel was included and a south porch was added. The arch to the south chapel is 14th century and all the windows of the south aisle are Decorated Gothic. In the 15th century a clerestory was added to the nave and a rood screen and rood loft were built across the nave and aisle. The chantry chapel was in disrepair by 1520 and demolished shortly after 1530. Later in the 16th century a large window was inserted in the north wall of the nave towards its western end. It and all the other windows in the north wall are Perpendicular Gothic. In 1867–68 the church building was restored, the chancel and south porch were rebuilt and the height of the chancel was increased.

In 1744 the wooden pulpit was built, and during the restoration of 1867–68 it was reduced in height. The pews were rebuilt in the 19th century but include some 17th and 18th century panelling. The tower has a ring of six bells. Richard Keene of Woodstock cast five of them including the treble and tenor bells in 1675; Thomas II Mears of the Whitechapel Bell Foundry cast the fourth bell in 1825. Rousham Rectory was a large house, consisting of eight bays in 1634 and 11 bays in 1685. It was remodelled in 1804 and enlarged in 1873, when the present attic floor was added. The architect of the 1873 works was William Wilkinson of Oxford, whose commissions included several clergy houses in Oxfordshire. In 1921 the house was sold to the Cottrell-Dormers.

== Economic and social history ==
The north-south Oxford–Banbury road that forms the parish's western boundary is an ancient ridgeway. It was a turnpike from 1755 until 1875. In the 1920s road classification the Oxford–Adderbury stretch of the former turnpike was made part of the A423 road. When the M40 motorway was completed in the 1990s the old Oxford–Banbury ridgeway was reclassified the A4260. The Bicester–Enstone road that forms part of the parish's northern boundary has existed at least since 1255 when a bridge was built at Lower Heyford to carry it across the River Cherwell. The road was a turnpike from 1793 until 1876. Since the 1920s road classification this road has been the B4030.

The Domesday Book records that by 1086 the parish had two water mills, presumably on the River Cherwell. By 1222 there was only one mill, and this still existed in 1547. Its later history is not clear but it had gone by 1721. In 1636 Sir Robert Dormer, lord of the manor of Rousham, refused to pay ship money. During the English Civil War a Royalist force plundered the house and village in 1644 and a detachment of Royalist cavalry occupied the house early in 1645. Most of Rousham parish was farmed under an open field system until the 18th century. There had been one small enclosure by 1601 and a second in 1645. The enclosure of the parish's remaining common lands in 1775 was by agreement between the landowners without recourse to an Act of Parliament.

Clement Cottrell-Dormer established a parish school in about 1785. Between 1808 and 1818 it had between 22 and 25 pupils, but there is no record of it after 1834. In 1878 Clement Upton-Cottrell-Dormer established a new parish school in the building just south of the parish church. It opened with 35 pupils but this declined to 25 in 1889 and 16 in 1906. The school was closed in 1926 but its building is still recognisable as the schoolhouse, complete with bell-turret on the western gable. Between 1845 and 1850 the Oxford and Rugby Railway was built, passing through the eastern margin of the parish beside the River Cherwell. In 1850 it opened Heyford railway station at Lower Heyford, 1/2 mile (800 m) north of Rousham village. The station is now part of the Cherwell Valley Line and is served by Great Western Railway trains.

== Gallery ==
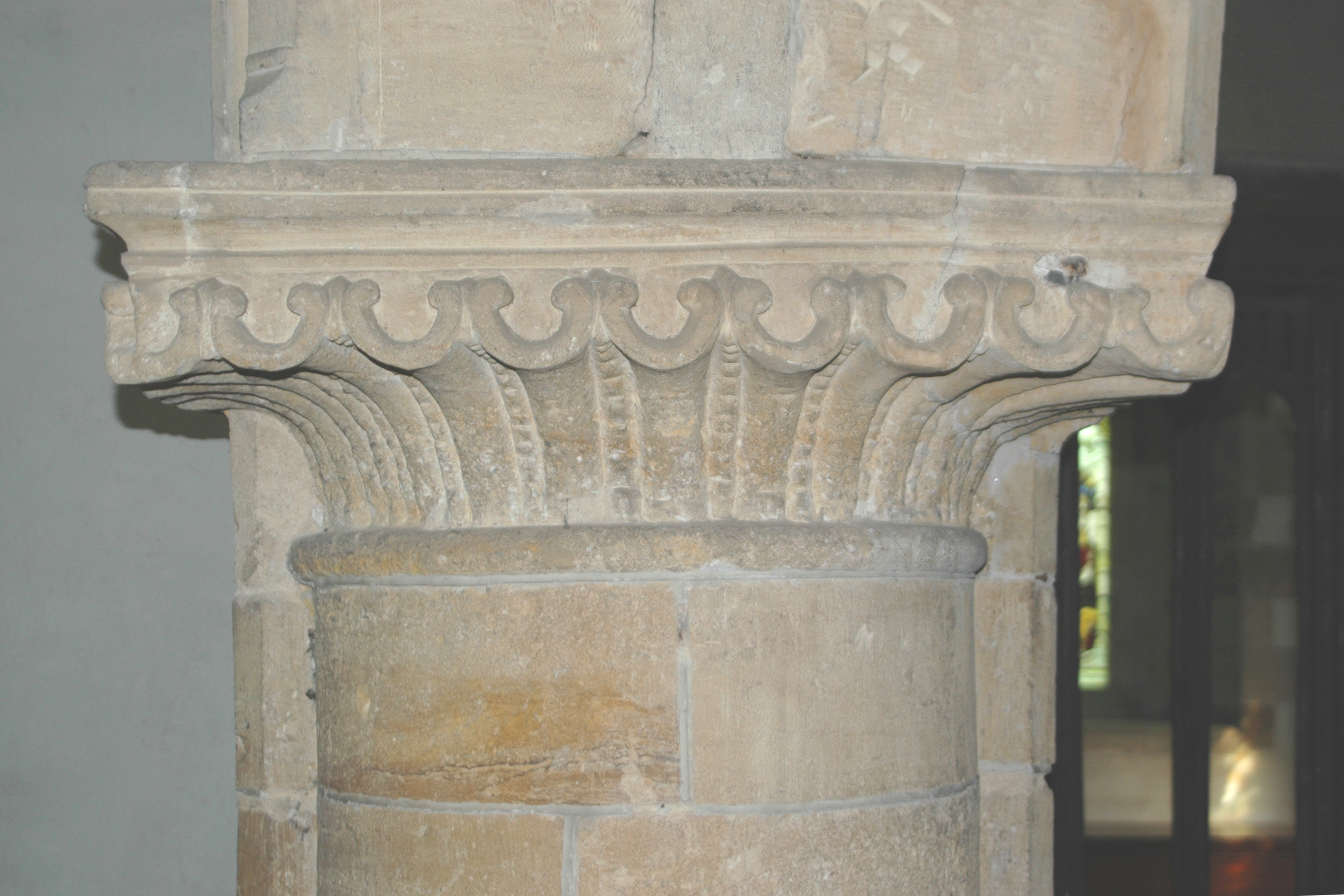
St Leonard and James': square-cut capital of impost on east side of east arch of south aisle, circa 1180

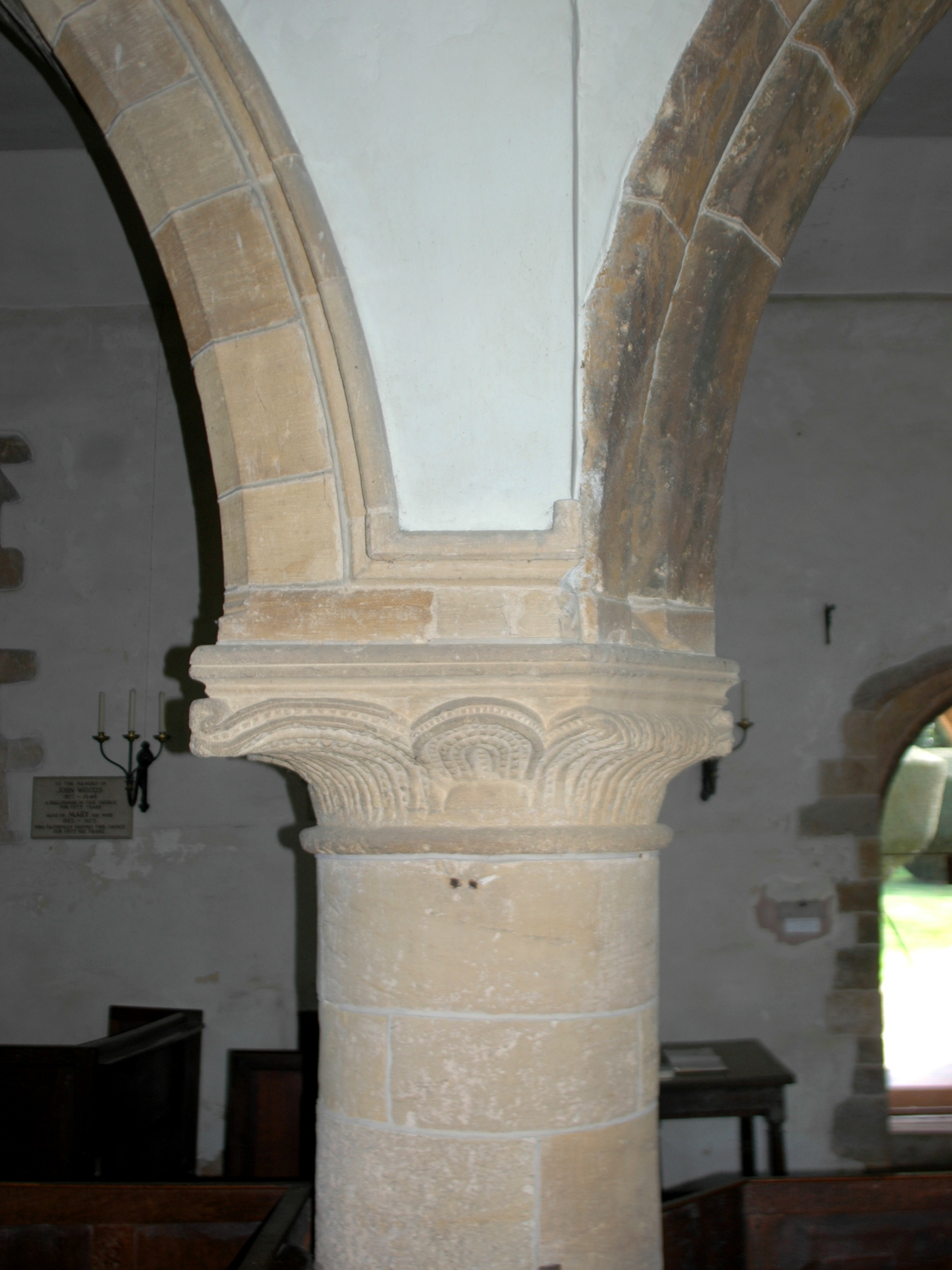
St Leonard and James': capital of column between east and middle arches of arcade of south aisle: square-cut on east side (circa 1180) but octagonally-cut on west side (early 13th century)

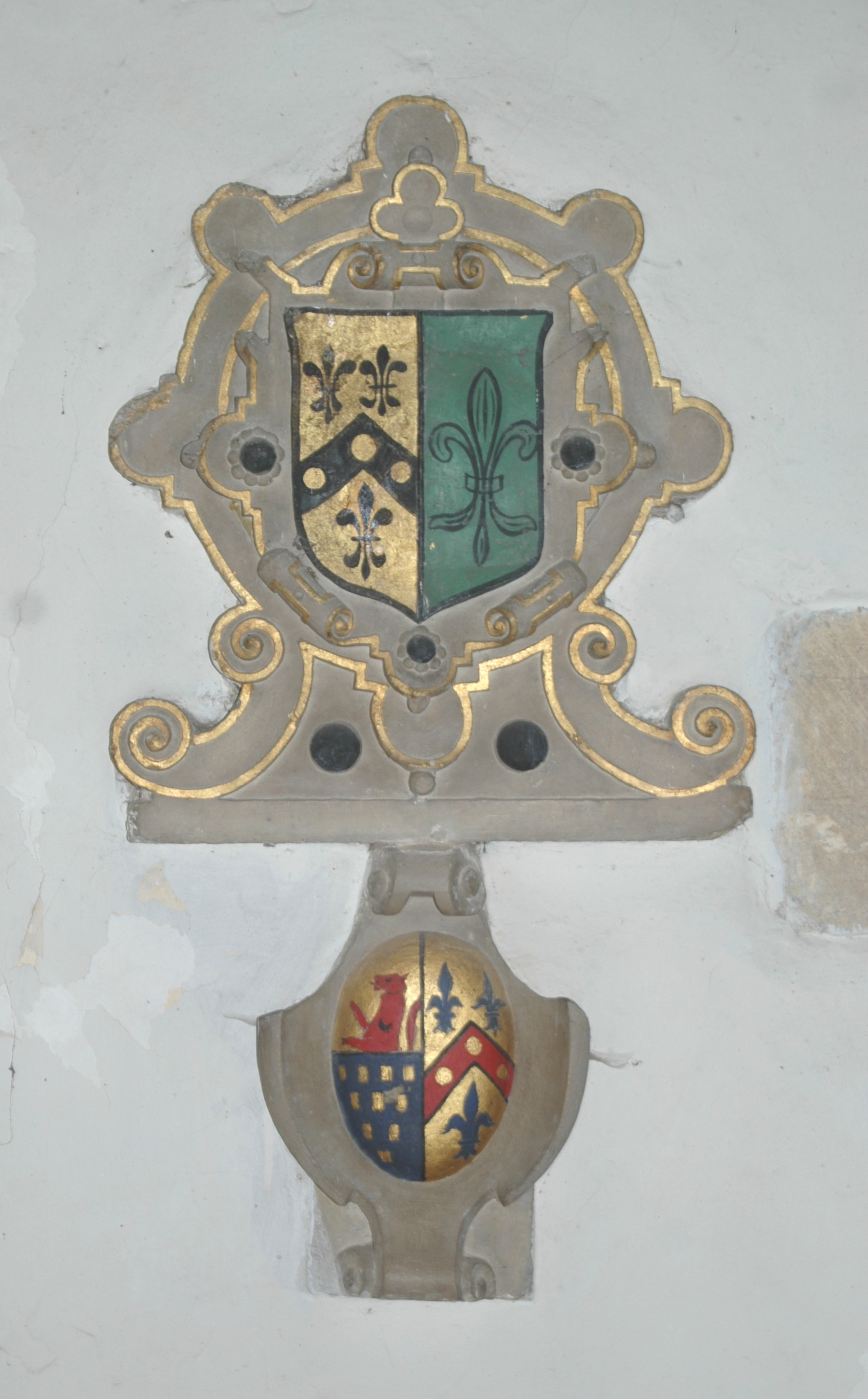
St Leonard and James': family coats of arms (in south aisle?)

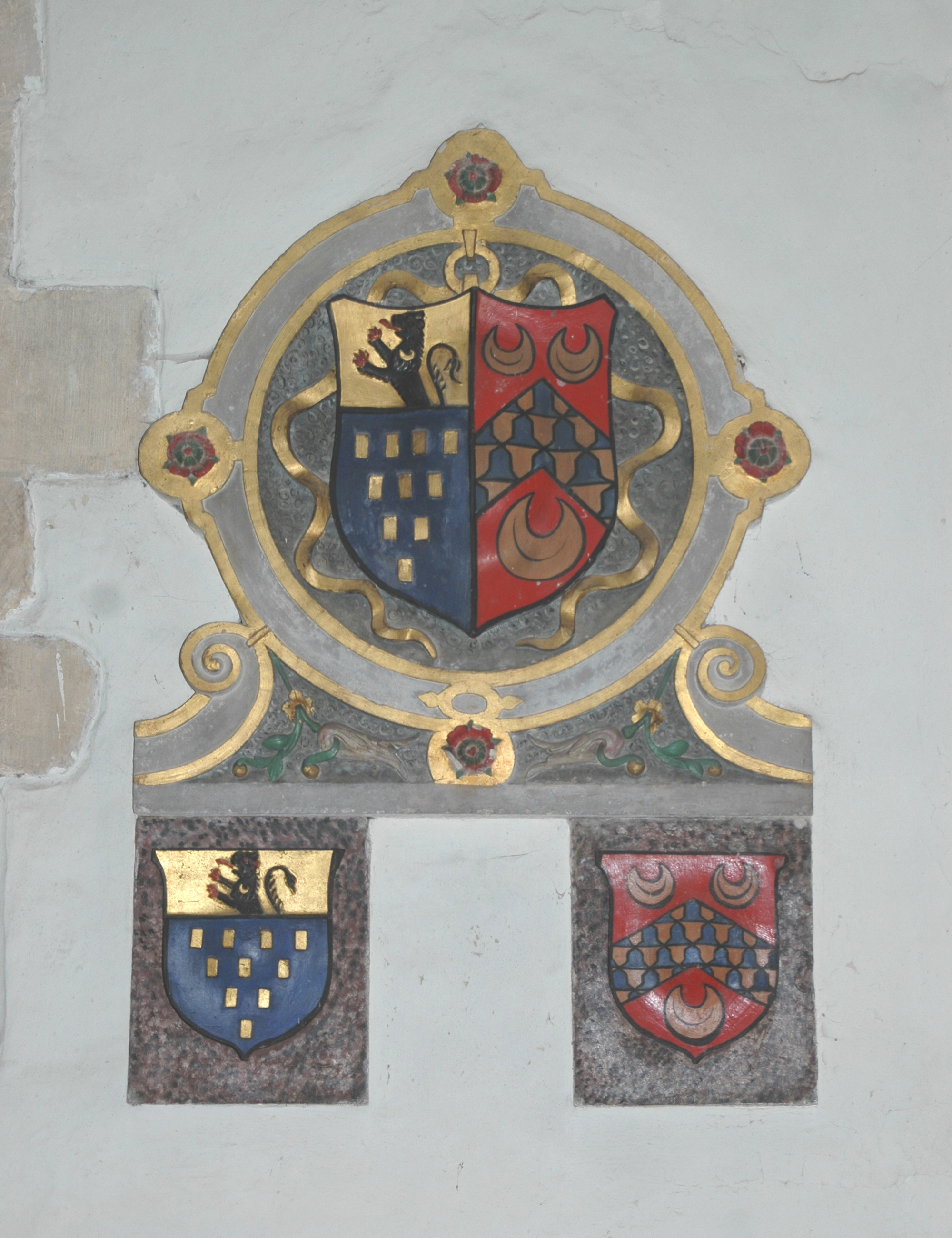
St Leonard and James': family coats of arms (in south aisle?)

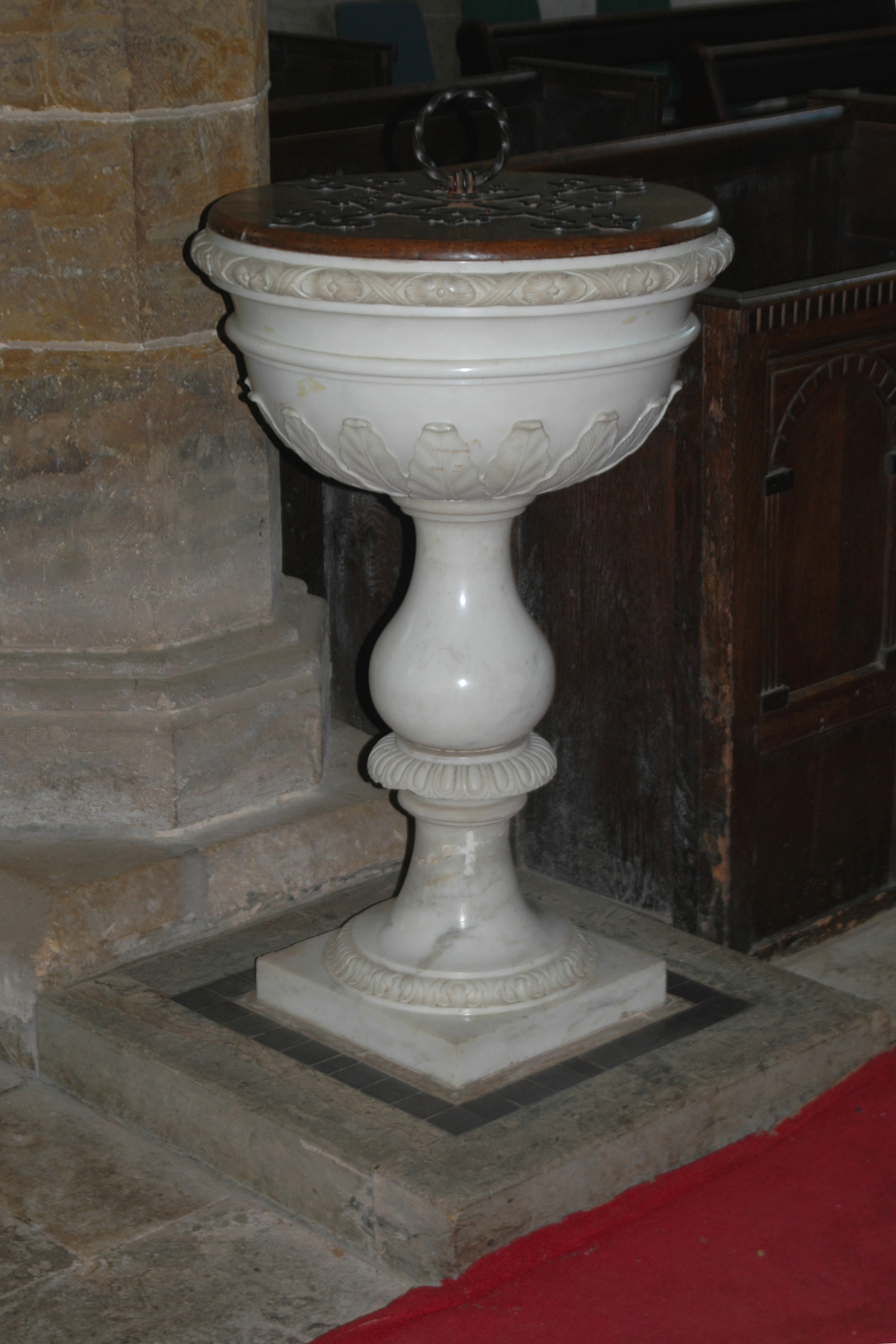
St Leonard and James': marble font installed in 1753

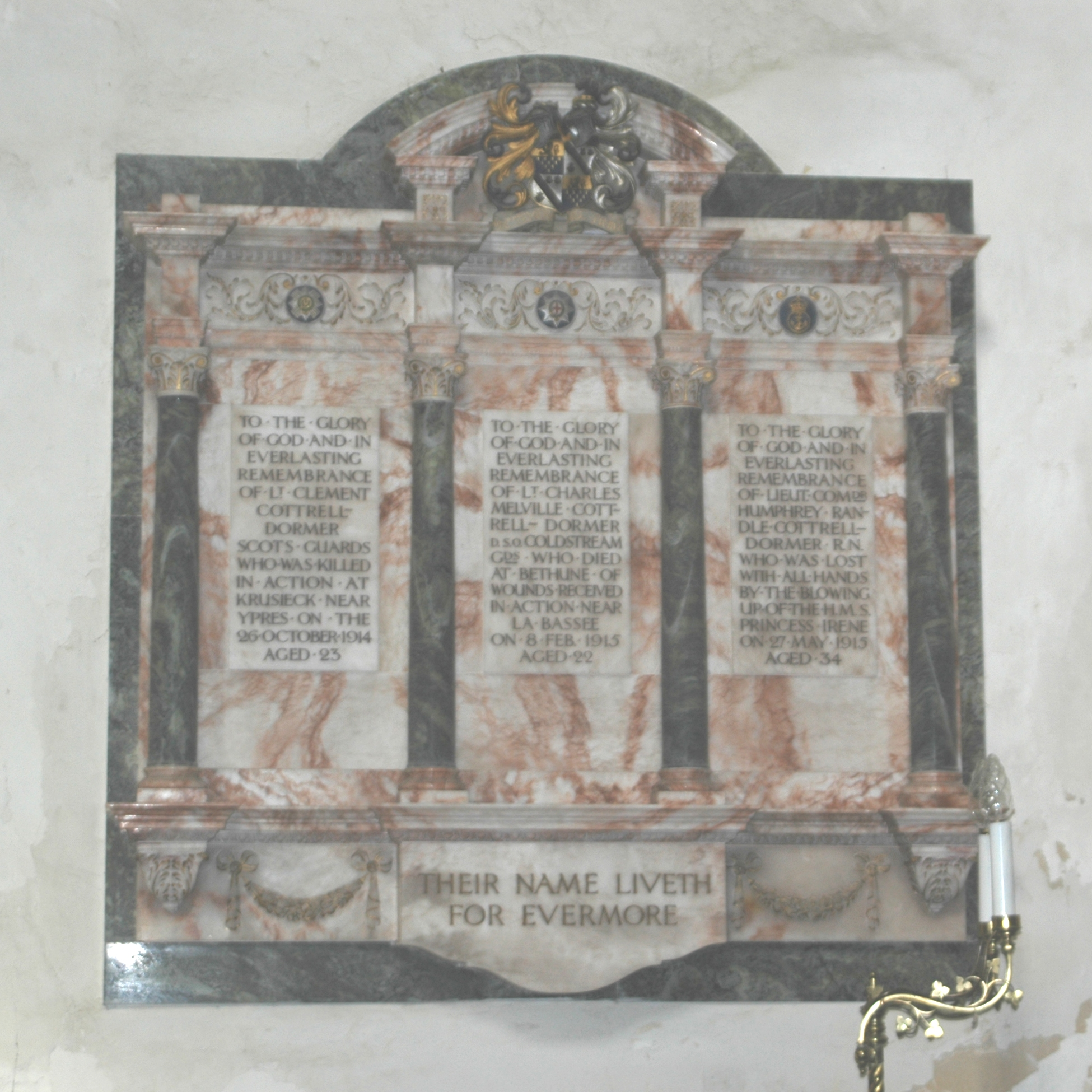
St Leonard and James': monument to Clement, Charles and Humphrey Cottrell-Dormer, died 1914–15

== Sources and further reading ==
- Crossley, Alan (ed.); Baggs, A.P.; Colvin, Christina; Colvin, H.M.; Cooper, Janet; Day, C.J.; Selwyn, Nesta; Tomkinson, A. (1983). A History of the County of Oxford. Victoria County History. Vol. 11: Wootton Hundred (northern part). London: Oxford University Press for the Institute of Historical Research. pp. 159–168. ISBN 978-0-19-722758-9.
- Maclagan, Michael (1947). "The Family of Dormer in Oxfordshire and Buckinghamshire" (PDF). Oxoniensia. XI–XII. Oxford Architectural and Historical Society: 90–101. ISSN 0308-5562.
- Sherwood, Jennifer; Pevsner, Nikolaus (1974). Oxfordshire. The Buildings of England. Harmondsworth: Penguin Books. pp. 739–746. ISBN 0-14-071045-0.
