= Grade II* listed buildings in South Kesteven =

There are over 20,000 Grade II* listed buildings in England. This page is a list of these buildings in the district of South Kesteven in Lincolnshire.

== South Kesteven ==
Name	Location	Type	Completed (Note: The date given is the date used by Historic England as significant for the initial building or that of an important part in the structure's description.)	Date designated	Grid ref. (Note: The grid reference is based on the British national grid reference system, sometimes known as OSGB36, used by the Ordnance Survey.) Geo-coordinates	Entry number (Note: The "List Entry Number" is a unique number assigned to each listed building and scheduled monument by Historic England.)	Image
Church of the Holy Trinity	Allington, South Kesteven	Parish Church	c. 1150	20 September 1966	SK8552840262; 52°57′11″N 0°43′42″W	1062909	Church of the Holy Trinity More images
Old Manor House	Allington, South Kesteven	Country House	17th century	19 February 1952	SK8559740142; 52°57′07″N 0°43′39″W	1360036	Old Manor House More images
Ancaster Hall	Ancaster, South Kesteven	Flats	17th century	19 September 1952	SK9829543599; 52°58′51″N 0°32′15″W	1062421	Ancaster Hall More images
Ancaster House	Ancaster, South Kesteven	House	17th century	19 February 1952	SK9825343360; 52°58′43″N 0°32′17″W	1360298	Upload Photo
Sudbrook Old Hall	Sudbrook, Ancaster, South Kesteven	Farmhouse	16th century	19 February 1952	SK9705944371; 52°59′16″N 0°33′20″W	1062424	Upload Photo
Gateway to Aslackby Manor	Aslackby and Laughton, South Kesteven	Gate	Mid 17th century	22 January 1987	TF0841530388; 52°51′36″N 0°23′28″W	1360115	Upload Photo
Barholm Old Hall	Barholm and Stowe, South Kesteven	House	15th century	6 May 1952	TF0884210689; 52°40′59″N 0°23′29″W	1062697	Upload Photo
Pigeoncote to Barholm Old Hall	Barholm and Stowe, South Kesteven	Dovecote	c. 1600	30 October 1968	TF0886210706; 52°40′59″N 0°23′28″W	1360164	Upload Photo
Bellmount Tower	Belton Park, Belton and Manthorpe, South Kesteven	Prospect Tower	Mid 18th century	21 September 1979	SK9489838814; 52°56′18″N 0°35′22″W	1194859	Bellmount Tower More images
Cascade at South West End of Boathouse Pond 600 Metres East of Belton House	Belton Park, Belton and Manthorpe, South Kesteven	Cascade	Early 18th century	14 November 1994	SK9351839264; 52°56′33″N 0°36′35″W	1194862	Cascade at South West End of Boathouse Pond 600 Metres East of Belton House
Entrance Gates and Railings to the Wilderness 150 Metres West of Belton House	Belton Park, Belton and Manthorpe, South Kesteven	Gate	Early 18th century	21 September 1979	SK9281639346; 52°56′37″N 0°37′13″W	1194863	Upload Photo
Former Brewhouse to Belton House	Belton Park, Belton and Manthorpe, South Kesteven	Brewhouse	1820	21 September 1979	SK9286239360; 52°56′37″N 0°37′10″W	1235604	Former Brewhouse to Belton House
Garden Temple 200 Metres East of Belton House	Belton Park, Belton and Manthorpe, South Kesteven	Garden Temple	Early 18th century	21 September 1979	SK9318739367; 52°56′37″N 0°36′53″W	1264931	Garden Temple 200 Metres East of Belton House More images
Orangery at North End of Italian Garden 200 Metres North of Belton House	Belton Park, Belton and Manthorpe, South Kesteven	Orangery	1821	19 February 1952	SK9293439512; 52°56′42″N 0°37′06″W	1187972	Orangery at North End of Italian Garden 200 Metres North of Belton House More images
Screen and Gateway to West Courtyard at Belton House	Belton Park, Belton and Manthorpe, South Kesteven	Gate	Early 18th century	19 February 1952	SK9293539297; 52°56′35″N 0°37′06″W	1194858	Screen and Gateway to West Courtyard at Belton House More images
Sundial 150 Metres North of Belton House	Belton Park, Belton and Manthorpe, South Kesteven	Sundial	c. 1690	21 September 1979	SK9301239423; 52°56′39″N 0°37′02″W	1235882	Sundial 150 Metres North of Belton House More images
West Wing to Belton House and Attached Boundary Wall	Belton Park, Belton and Manthorpe, South Kesteven	Boundary Wall	1685-1688	19 February 1952	SK9292839310; 52°56′35″N 0°37′07″W	1194857	West Wing to Belton House and Attached Boundary Wall More images
The Old Hall	Billingborough, South Kesteven	Country House	Late 16th century	6 May 1952	TF1173434291; 52°53′40″N 0°20′26″W	1164828	Upload Photo
Red Hall	Bourne, South Kesteven	House	Early 17th century	2 May 1949	TF0960619816; 52°45′53″N 0°22′37″W	1259132	Red Hall More images
Church of St. Faith	Wilsthorpe, Braceborough and Wilsthorpe, South Kesteven	Parish Church	1715	30 October 1968	TF0922513647; 52°42′34″N 0°23′05″W	1062675	Church of St. Faith More images
Church of St Margaret	Braceby, Braceby and Sapperton, South Kesteven	Parish Church	13th century	20 September 1966	TF0164135352; 52°54′22″N 0°29′25″W	1360324	Church of St Margaret More images
Church of St Wilfrid in Grounds of Holywell Hall	Holywell, Careby Aunby and Holywell, South Kesteven	Church	12th century	30 October 1968	TF0002816015; 52°43′57″N 0°31′12″W	1360080	Church of St Wilfrid in Grounds of Holywell Hall More images
Fishing Temple in Grounds of Holywell Hall	Holywell, Careby Aunby and Holywell, South Kesteven	Garden Temple	c. 1732	30 October 1968	SK9991915931; 52°43′54″N 0°31′18″W	1062834	Fishing Temple in Grounds of Holywell Hall More images
Holywell Hall	Holywell, Careby Aunby and Holywell, South Kesteven	Country House	17th century	6 May 1952	SK9999516046; 52°43′58″N 0°31′14″W	1062833	Holywell Hall More images
Pigeoncote at Holywell Hall	Holywell, Careby Aunby and Holywell, South Kesteven	Dovecote	Mid 17th century	30 October 1968	SK9996716077; 52°43′59″N 0°31′15″W	1062835	Pigeoncote at Holywell Hall
The Priory	Castle Bytham, South Kesteven	House	15th century	30 October 1968	SK9888118325; 52°45′13″N 0°32′11″W	1062846	Upload Photo
Caythorpe Court	Caythorpe, South Kesteven	Country House	1899	14 September 1984	SK9575648281; 53°01′24″N 0°34′26″W	1062429	Caythorpe Court More images
Caythorpe Hall	Caythorpe, South Kesteven	Country House	1823	19 February 1955	SK9384848882; 53°01′44″N 0°36′08″W	1165323	Caythorpe Hall
Pickworth House	Caythorpe, South Kesteven	House	1684	19 February 1952	SK9381248244; 53°01′24″N 0°36′10″W	1062396	Pickworth House
Chapel Cottage	Colsterworth, South Kesteven	House	12th century	20 September 1966	SK9228924409; 52°48′34″N 0°37′56″W	1365619	Upload Photo
Deeping Gate Bridge over the River Welland	Deeping St James, South Kesteven	Bridge	1651	24 February 1982	TF1507209500; 52°40′16″N 0°17′59″W	1309230	Deeping Gate Bridge over the River Welland More images
Priory Farmhouse	Deeping St James, South Kesteven	House	Early 17th century	30 October 1968	TF1575709625; 52°40′19″N 0°17′22″W	1164963	Upload Photo
Agent's House	Denton, South Kesteven	House	Early 17th century	9 February 1952	SK8700232284; 52°52′52″N 0°42′31″W	1360340	Agent's House More images
Garden Gateway to Agents House	Denton, South Kesteven	Gate	Mid 17th century	21 September 1979	SK8699332271; 52°52′51″N 0°42′31″W	1062341	Upload Photo
St Christopher's Well in Denton Park	Denton, South Kesteven	Grotto	1823	21 September 1979	SK8618832030; 52°52′44″N 0°43′15″W	1062336	Upload Photo
Church of St. Andrew	Dowsby, South Kesteven	Church	11th century	22 January 1987	TF1132829276; 52°50′58″N 0°20′54″W	1164977	Church of St. Andrew More images
Dowsby Hall	Dowsby, South Kesteven	Country House	Early 17th century	6 May 1952	TF1105229307; 52°50′59″N 0°21′09″W	1317485	Dowsby Hall More images
3 Statues East of Grimsthorpe Castle	Grimsthorpe Park, Edenham, South Kesteven	Statue	Mid 18th century	15 December 1986	TF0452422837; 52°47′35″N 0°27′05″W	1360074	3 Statues East of Grimsthorpe Castle More images
4 Garden Ornaments on South Terrace at Grimsthorpe Castle	Grimsthorpe Park, Edenham, South Kesteven	Formal Garden	c. 1723	15 December 1986	TF0448422682; 52°47′30″N 0°27′07″W	1308944	Upload Photo
Gardeners Cottage	Grimsthorpe Park, Edenham, South Kesteven	Estate Cottage	c. 1723	15 December 1986	TF0472422472; 52°47′23″N 0°26′55″W	1166363	Upload Photo
Folkingham Manor House	Folkingham, South Kesteven	Country House	c. 1650	30 October 1968	TF0729033559; 52°53′20″N 0°24′25″W	1360148	Folkingham Manor House More images
Greyhound Antique Shop	Folkingham, South Kesteven	Assembly Rooms	c. 1650	6 May 1952	TF0719233696; 52°53′24″N 0°24′30″W	1062747	Greyhound Antique Shop More images
House of Correction	Folkingham, South Kesteven	House	1825	6 May 1952	TF0746033476; 52°53′17″N 0°24′16″W	1360144	House of Correction More images
Ermine House	Fulbeck, South Kesteven	Country House	17th century	19 February 1952	SK9469750296; 53°02′30″N 0°35′21″W	1062408	Upload Photo
Fulbeck Hall	Fulbeck, South Kesteven	Country House	1733	19 February 1952	SK9473350518; 53°02′37″N 0°35′18″W	1270291	Fulbeck Hall More images
Fulbeck House	Fulbeck, South Kesteven	Country House	c. 1700	19 February 1952	SK9488850674; 53°02′42″N 0°35′10″W	1309048	Upload Photo
Fulbeck Manor	Fulbeck, South Kesteven	Country House	17th century	19 February 1952	SK9478450249; 53°02′28″N 0°35′16″W	1166259	Fulbeck Manor More images
Gates of Fulbeck Hall	Fulbeck, South Kesteven	Gate	1733	14 September 1984	SK9488450501; 53°02′36″N 0°35′10″W	1360292	Gates of Fulbeck Hall
Barn at Church Farm	Great Ponton, South Kesteven	Barn	16th century	9 January 1987	SK9262330460; 52°51′49″N 0°37′32″W	1062348	Upload Photo
The Old Rectory Wall and Gate Piers	Great Ponton, South Kesteven	House	14th century	19 February 1952	SK9246130422; 52°51′48″N 0°37′41″W	1147917	The Old Rectory Wall and Gate Piers More images
Barn at Greatford Hall	Greatford, South Kesteven	Barn	C20	30 October 1968	TF0859911889; 52°41′38″N 0°23′40″W	1062684	Barn at Greatford Hall More images
Heggy's Cottage	Haconby, South Kesteven	House	Late 16th century	22 January 1987	TF1037425219; 52°48′48″N 0°21′50″W	1062712	Heggy's Cottage More images
Baroque Terrace Fountain and Statues 25 Metres South East of Harlaxton Manor	Harlaxton, South Kesteven	Balustrade	1838-1844	14 November 1994	SK8957832246; 52°52′49″N 0°40′13″W	1236526	Baroque Terrace Fountain and Statues 25 Metres South East of Harlaxton Manor
Bridge 800 Metres North West of Harlaxton Manor	Harlaxton, South Kesteven	Bridge	1822-1838	24 September 1979	SK8877232864; 52°53′09″N 0°40′56″W	1187968	Bridge 800 Metres North West of Harlaxton Manor More images
Gatehouse 400 Metres North West of Harlaxton Manor and Attached Boundary Walls	Harlaxton, South Kesteven	Wall	c1832-1838	24 September 1979	SK8917632550; 52°52′59″N 0°40′34″W	1236606	Gatehouse 400 Metres North West of Harlaxton Manor and Attached Boundary Walls More images
Gateway and Screen Wall 1200 Metres North West of Harlaxton Manor	Harlaxton, South Kesteven	Gate	c1832-1844	24 September 1979	SK8847033089; 52°53′17″N 0°41′12″W	1298442	Gateway and Screen Wall 1200 Metres North West of Harlaxton Manor More images
Gazebo 80 Metres South of Harlaxton Manor	Harlaxton, South Kesteven	Gazebo	c1838-1844	14 November 1994	SK8950432165; 52°52′46″N 0°40′17″W	1298388	Gazebo 80 Metres South of Harlaxton Manor More images
Kitchen Garden Walls and Gardeners House 500 Metres North West of Harlaxton Manor	Harlaxton, South Kesteven	House	c1832-1844	24 September 1979	SK8902832746; 52°53′05″N 0°40′42″W	1298389	Kitchen Garden Walls and Gardeners House 500 Metres North West of Harlaxton Manor More images
Ornamental Garden Steps 50 Metres South West of Harlaxton Manor	Harlaxton, South Kesteven	Steps	c1838-1844	14 November 1994	SK8947232212; 52°52′48″N 0°40′19″W	1236717	Upload Photo
Heydour Priory	Heydour, South Kesteven	House	Late 16th century	19 February 1952	TF0102239465; 52°56′35″N 0°29′53″W	1308929	Upload Photo
Oasby Manor House	Oasby, Heydour, South Kesteven	House	17th century	19 February 1952	TF0027039056; 52°56′22″N 0°30′34″W	1062391	Upload Photo
Well	Horbling, South Kesteven	Trough	1711	22 January 1987	TF1181535291; 52°54′12″N 0°20′20″W	1309087	Well More images
Hougham Manor House	Hougham, South Kesteven	House	Medieval	19 February 1952	SK8882044187; 52°59′16″N 0°40′42″W	1062890	Hougham Manor House More images
Brandon Old Hall	Brandon, Hough-on-the-Hill, South Kesteven	House	Early 16th century	19 February 1952	SK9041248338; 53°01′29″N 0°39′12″W	1166332	Brandon Old Hall
Chapel	Hough-on-the-Hill, South Kesteven	Chapel of Ease	Early 12th century	20 September 1966	SK9034448133; 53°01′22″N 0°39′16″W	1062416	Chapel More images
Church of All Saints	Stroxton, Little Ponton and Stroxton, South Kesteven	Parish Church	12th century	20 September 1966	SK9023531068; 52°52′10″N 0°39′39″W	1360365	Church of All Saints More images
Pigeoncote at Little Ponton Hall	Little Ponton and Stroxton, South Kesteven	Dovecote	Early 18th century	9 January 1987	SK9281032218; 52°52′46″N 0°37′20″W	1360364	Upload Photo
Archway at Harrowby Hall	Harrowby Without, Londonthorpe and Harrowby Without, South Kesteven	Arch	Early 17th century	20 September 1984	SK9361735834; 52°54′42″N 0°36′34″W	1253210	Upload Photo
Church of St John the Baptist	Londonthorpe, Londonthorpe and Harrowby Without, South Kesteven	Parish Church	13th century	20 September 1966	SK9532938031; 52°55′52″N 0°35′00″W	1253207	Church of St John the Baptist More images
Hall Farm House	Londonthorpe, Londonthorpe and Harrowby Without, South Kesteven	Farmhouse	c. 1730	20 September 1984	SK9533338108; 52°55′55″N 0°34′59″W	1261914	Upload Photo
Harrowby Hall	Harrowby Without, Londonthorpe and Harrowby Without, South Kesteven	Country House	1628	20 September 1984	SK9360935793; 52°54′41″N 0°36′34″W	1261915	Harrowby Hall More images
The Mill	Londonthorpe, Londonthorpe and Harrowby Without, South Kesteven	House	Late 18th century	20 September 1984	SK9242438090; 52°55′56″N 0°37′35″W	1253212	Upload Photo
Marston Hall	Marston, South Kesteven	Country House	Late 16th century	19 February 1952	SK8935643664; 52°58′58″N 0°40′14″W	1062854	Upload Photo
Parish Church of St Nicholas	Normanton, South Kesteven	Parish Church	11th century	20 September 1966	SK9489346249; 53°00′19″N 0°35′14″W	1146921	Parish Church of St Nicholas More images
Church of St Mary Magdalene	Old Somerby, South Kesteven	Parish Church	12th century	20 September 1966	SK9648333962; 52°53′40″N 0°34′02″W	1261872	Church of St Mary Magdalene More images
Great Humby Chapel	Humby, Ropsley and Humby, South Kesteven	Chapel of Ease	built originally c1680	20 September 1966	TF0071032338; 52°52′45″N 0°30′18″W	1253290	Great Humby Chapel More images
Sedgebrook Manor House	Sedgebrook, South Kesteven	Manor House	c. 1632	19 February 1952	SK8573238123; 52°56′01″N 0°43′33″W	1298359	Upload Photo
Assembly Rooms	Stamford, South Kesteven	Assembly Rooms	1727	22 May 1954	TF0314207060; 52°39′05″N 0°28′36″W	1168799	Assembly Rooms More images
Barn Hill House	Stamford, South Kesteven	House	Late 17th century	22 May 1954	TF0275707203; 52°39′10″N 0°28′57″W	1360348	Barn Hill House More images
Brazenose School House (part of Stamford School)	Stamford, South Kesteven	School House	Early 18th century	22 May 1954	TF0331807324; 52°39′14″N 0°28′27″W	1062946	Brazenose School House (part of Stamford School) More images
Bull and Swan Inn	Stamford, South Kesteven	House	Late 16th century	22 May 1954	TF0315306684; 52°38′53″N 0°28′36″W	1062163	Bull and Swan Inn More images
Burghley Almshouses Lord Burghley's Hospital	Stamford, South Kesteven	Garden Wall	1597	22 May 1954	TF0302406903; 52°39′00″N 0°28′43″W	1360415	Burghley Almshouses Lord Burghley's Hospital More images
Bursar's House	Stamford, South Kesteven	House	Modern	26 April 1974	TF0325707325; 52°39′14″N 0°28′30″W	1062944	Bursar's House More images
Clapton House	Stamford, South Kesteven	House	Mid 18th century	22 May 1954	TF0328807310; 52°39′13″N 0°28′28″W	1169988	Clapton House
Gazebo in Garden of Barn Hill House	Stamford, South Kesteven	Gazebo	Mid 18th century	22 May 1954	TF0276007231; 52°39′11″N 0°28′57″W	1062279	Gazebo in Garden of Barn Hill House
Municipal Offices	Stamford, South Kesteven	Arch	18th century	22 May 1954	TF0306406982; 52°39′03″N 0°28′41″W	1062179	Municipal Offices More images
Number 4 (Browne's Hospital) Chapel and Hall. All Other Buildings at Browne's Hospital	Stamford, South Kesteven	Church Hall	15th century	22 May 1954	TF0295707286; 52°39′13″N 0°28′46″W	1062247	Number 4 (Browne's Hospital) Chapel and Hall. All Other Buildings at Browne's Hospital More images
Old Theatre	Stamford, South Kesteven	Club	1766	22 May 1954	TF0311907077; 52°39′06″N 0°28′38″W	1062976	Old Theatre More images
Railings and Terrace to No 1 Broad Street	Stamford, South Kesteven	Gate		26 April 1974	TF0292407195; 52°39′10″N 0°28′48″W	1062288	Railings and Terrace to No 1 Broad Street
St Martin's Guest House	Stamford, South Kesteven	House	Late 18th century	22 May 1954	TF0307706556; 52°38′49″N 0°28′40″W	1169212	St Martin's Guest House More images
Stamford Hotel	Stamford, South Kesteven	Hotel	1820	22 May 1954	TF0304907082; 52°39′06″N 0°28′41″W	1062971	Stamford Hotel More images
Stukeley House (9 Barn Hill)	Stamford, South Kesteven	House	1741	22 May 1954	TF0277307259; 52°39′12″N 0°28′56″W	1147402	Stukeley House (9 Barn Hill) More images
Sunday School, Barn Hill	Stamford, South Kesteven	Sunday School	18th century	22 May 1954	TF0280007270; 52°39′12″N 0°28′54″W	1308533	Upload Photo
The George Hotel	Stamford, South Kesteven	Hall House	14th century	22 May 1954	TF0305106846; 52°38′58″N 0°28′41″W	1169387	The George Hotel More images
Town Hall	Stamford, South Kesteven	Town Hall	1777	22 May 1954	TF0305407017; 52°39′04″N 0°28′41″W	1306544	Town Hall More images
Wall and Gatepiers to Barn Hill House	Stamford, South Kesteven	Gate Pier	18th century	26 April 1974	TF0277507219; 52°39′11″N 0°28′56″W	1147390	Wall and Gatepiers to Barn Hill House More images
Wall and Gates to No 2 Broad Street	Stamford, South Kesteven	Gate		26 April 1974	TF0294107217; 52°39′11″N 0°28′47″W	1062289	Wall and Gates to No 2 Broad Street
Welland House (junior House of Girls' High School)	Stamford, South Kesteven	House	1795	22 May 1954	TF0320506871; 52°38′59″N 0°28′33″W	1062936	Welland House (junior House of Girls' High School)
21 St George's Square	Stamford, South Kesteven	House	1772	22 May 1954	TF0315407057; 52°39′05″N 0°28′36″W	1062223	21 St George's Square More images
10 Barn Hill	Stamford, South Kesteven	House	17th century	22 May 1954	TF0277607251; 52°39′12″N 0°28′56″W	1062280	10 Barn Hill More images
1 Broad Street	Stamford, South Kesteven	House	17th century	22 May 1954	TF0290707205; 52°39′10″N 0°28′49″W	1062287	1 Broad Street More images
11 and 12 High Street	Stamford, South Kesteven	Shop	Modern	22 May 1954	TF0298607159; 52°39′09″N 0°28′45″W	1062227	11 and 12 High Street More images
18 St George's Square	Stamford, South Kesteven	House	Early 18th century	22 May 1954	TF0318807054; 52°39′05″N 0°28′34″W	1062221	18 St George's Square More images
43 St Martin's	Stamford, South Kesteven	House	18th century	22 May 1954	TF0316406596; 52°38′50″N 0°28′36″W	1062170	43 St Martin's More images
1 All Saints' Place	Stamford, South Kesteven	House	Late 18th century	22 May 1954	TF0285007200; 52°39′10″N 0°28′52″W	1062302	1 All Saints' Place More images
2 St Mary's Place	Stamford, South Kesteven	House	Early 18th century	22 May 1954	TF0308807042; 52°39′05″N 0°28′39″W	1062962	2 St Mary's Place More images
20 St George's Square	Stamford, South Kesteven	House	Late 18th century	22 May 1954	TF0316507058; 52°39′05″N 0°28′35″W	1062222	20 St George's Square More images
34 Broad Street	Stamford, South Kesteven	House	Mid 18th century	22 May 1954	TF0305407259; 52°39′12″N 0°28′41″W	1062257	34 Broad Street More images
8–10 St Martin's	Stamford, South Kesteven	Shop	Mid 19th century	22 May 1954	TF0307406858; 52°38′59″N 0°28′40″W	1062198	8–10 St Martin's More images
12 Barn Hill	Stamford, South Kesteven	House	Late 17th century	22 May 1954	TF0278907234; 52°39′11″N 0°28′55″W	1062281	12 Barn Hill More images
6 Red Lion Square	Stamford, South Kesteven	Jettied House	15th century	26 April 1974	TF0289807096; 52°39′07″N 0°28′49″W	1062212	6 Red Lion Square More images
15–17 High Street	Stamford, South Kesteven	Building	Early 18th century	22 May 1954	TF0300207171; 52°39′09″N 0°28′44″W	1062229	15–17 High Street More images
6 Barn Hill	Stamford, South Kesteven	House	17th century	22 May 1954	TF0278207200; 52°39′10″N 0°28′55″W	1062278	6 Barn Hill More images
2 All Saints' Place	Stamford, South Kesteven	House	Mid 18th century	22 May 1954	TF0285607196; 52°39′10″N 0°28′51″W	1062303	2 All Saints' Place More images
15 Barn Hill	Stamford, South Kesteven	House	Early 19th century	22 May 1954	TF0282607213; 52°39′10″N 0°28′53″W	1062282	15 Barn Hill
24 St Martin's	Stamford, South Kesteven	House	Early 19th century	22 May 1954	TF0314406713; 52°38′54″N 0°28′37″W	1062161	24 St Martin's More images
46 St Martin's	Stamford, South Kesteven	House	Late 18th century	22 May 1954	TF0312706655; 52°38′52″N 0°28′38″W	1062172	46 St Martin's More images
14 High Street	Stamford, South Kesteven	Shop	Modern	22 May 1954	TF0300107162; 52°39′09″N 0°28′44″W	1062228	14 High Street More images
1 and 2 Burghley Lane	Stamford, South Kesteven	House	Early 17th century	22 May 1954	TF0321006586; 52°38′50″N 0°28′33″W	1062260	1 and 2 Burghley Lane More images
24a St Martin's	Stamford, South Kesteven	House	Early 19th century	22 May 1954	TF0315006696; 52°38′54″N 0°28′36″W	1062162	24a St Martin's More images
52 St Martin's	Stamford, South Kesteven	House	17th century	22 May 1954	TF0311606688; 52°38′53″N 0°28′38″W	1062173	52 St Martin's
20 High Street	Stamford, South Kesteven	Shop	19th century	22 May 1954	TF0303207185; 52°39′09″N 0°28′42″W	1062230	20 High Street More images
13 St Mary's Street	Stamford, South Kesteven	Lamp Bracket	First half of 19th century	22 May 1954	TF0300307072; 52°39′06″N 0°28′44″W	1062969	13 St Mary's Street More images
34 St Martin's	Stamford, South Kesteven	House	Mid 18th century	22 May 1954	TF0319806594; 52°38′50″N 0°28′34″W	1062167	34 St Martin's More images
36 St Martin's	Stamford, South Kesteven	House	Mid-late 18th century	22 May 1954	TF0320806561; 52°38′49″N 0°28′33″W	1062168	36 St Martin's More images
71 High Street	Stamford, South Kesteven	Shop	Early 19th century	26 April 1974	TF0293907102; 52°39′07″N 0°28′47″W	1062239	71 High Street More images
23 St Mary's Street	Stamford, South Kesteven	House	c. 1750	22 May 1954	TF0312407106; 52°39′07″N 0°28′37″W	1062974	23 St Mary's Street More images
4 and 5 All Saints Place	Stamford, South Kesteven	House	Late 17th century or early 18th century	22 May 1954	TF0286807181; 52°39′09″N 0°28′51″W	1062304	4 and 5 All Saints Place
3 Barn Hill	Stamford, South Kesteven	House	Mid 18th century	22 May 1954	TF0281507190; 52°39′10″N 0°28′54″W	1062277	3 Barn Hill More images
7 Ironmonger Street	Stamford, South Kesteven	Building	1801	22 May 1954	TF0302807190; 52°39′10″N 0°28′42″W	1062243	Upload Photo
11 and 12 St Mary's Street	Stamford, South Kesteven	Shop	19th century	22 May 1954	TF0299607074; 52°39′06″N 0°28′44″W	1062968	11 and 12 St Mary's Street More images
3 St Mary's Place	Stamford, South Kesteven	House	Mid 18th century	22 May 1954	TF0307807041; 52°39′05″N 0°28′40″W	1062963	3 St Mary's Place More images
15 and 15a St Mary's Street	Stamford, South Kesteven	Boot Scraper	Modern	22 May 1954	TF0303007077; 52°39′06″N 0°28′42″W	1062970	15 and 15a St Mary's Street More images
20 St Mary's Street	Stamford, South Kesteven	House	18th century	22 May 1954	TF0309307105; 52°39′07″N 0°28′39″W	1062973	20 St Mary's Street More images
27 St Mary's Street	Stamford, South Kesteven	House	Early 19th century	22 May 1954	TF0313307078; 52°39′06″N 0°28′37″W	1062975	27 St Mary's Street More images
17 Barn Hill	Stamford, South Kesteven	House	18th century	22 May 1954	TF0284307203; 52°39′10″N 0°28′52″W	1147459	17 Barn Hill More images
5 Barn Hill	Stamford, South Kesteven	House	17th century	22 May 1954	TF0279207197; 52°39′10″N 0°28′55″W	1147366	5 Barn Hill More images
19 St George's Square	Stamford, South Kesteven	House	1674	22 May 1954	TF0317607056; 52°39′05″N 0°28′35″W	1168787	19 St George's Square More images
68 and 69 St Martin's	Stamford, South Kesteven	House	Late 17th century or early 18th century	22 May 1954	TF0304606827; 52°38′58″N 0°28′42″W	1169363	68 and 69 St Martin's More images
53 St Martin's	Stamford, South Kesteven	House	17th century	22 May 1954	TF0311006708; 52°38′54″N 0°28′39″W	1169304	Upload Photo
25 and 26 St Mary's Street	Stamford, South Kesteven	Garage	Early 19th century	22 May 1954	TF0315407101; 52°39′07″N 0°28′36″W	1169809	25 and 26 St Mary's Street More images
45 St Martin's	Stamford, South Kesteven	House	Early-mid 18th century	22 May 1954	TF0313706644; 52°38′52″N 0°28′37″W	1169247	45 St Martin's More images
22 St Mary's Street	Stamford, South Kesteven	House	c. 1770	22 May 1954	TF0311007105; 52°39′07″N 0°28′38″W	1169808	22 St Mary's Street More images
62 St Leonard's Street	Stamford, South Kesteven	House	17th century	22 May 1954	TF0321607166; 52°39′09″N 0°28′32″W	1306706	62 St Leonard's Street More images
4 St Mary's Street	Stamford, South Kesteven	Shop	Early 19th century	22 May 1954	TF0294607054; 52°39′05″N 0°28′47″W	1306445	4 St Mary's Street More images
20 and 21 Broad Street	Stamford, South Kesteven	House	Late 18th century	22 May 1954	TF0315907323; 52°39′14″N 0°28′35″W	1308463	20 and 21 Broad Street More images
14 St Mary's Street	Stamford, South Kesteven	Shop	First half of 19th century	22 May 1954	TF0301607076; 52°39′06″N 0°28′43″W	1306425	14 St Mary's Street More images
9 and 10 Ironmonger Street	Stamford, South Kesteven	Boot Scraper	Early 19th century	22 May 1954	TF0302407196; 52°39′10″N 0°28′43″W	1307000	9 and 10 Ironmonger Street More images
24 St Mary's Street	Stamford, South Kesteven	House	Mid 18th century	22 May 1954	TF0313207108; 52°39′07″N 0°28′37″W	1360030	24 St Mary's Street More images
4 Barn Hill	Stamford, South Kesteven	House	17th century	22 May 1954	TF0279707194; 52°39′10″N 0°28′55″W	1360347	4 Barn Hill More images
11 St Martin's	Stamford, South Kesteven	Shop	Modern	22 May 1954	TF0308006861; 52°38′59″N 0°28′40″W	1360386	11 St Martin's More images
9a Barn Hill	Stamford, South Kesteven	House	Early 19th century	22 May 1954	TF0275607254; 52°39′12″N 0°28′57″W	1360349	9a Barn Hill
35 and 36 St Peter's Street	Stamford, South Kesteven	Shop	Early 19th century	22 May 1954	TF0266107036; 52°39′05″N 0°29′02″W	1360044	35 and 36 St Peter's Street More images
1 St Mary's Place	Stamford, South Kesteven	House	Early 19th century	22 May 1954	TF0307507060; 52°39′05″N 0°28′40″W	1360026	1 St Mary's Place More images
18 and 19 High Street	Stamford, South Kesteven	Shop	19th century	22 May 1954	TF0301707185; 52°39′09″N 0°28′43″W	1360400	18 and 19 High Street More images
21 St Mary's Street	Stamford, South Kesteven	House	Early-mid 19th century	22 May 1954	TF0309707106; 52°39′07″N 0°28′39″W	1360029	21 St Mary's Street More images
33 St Martin's	Stamford, South Kesteven	House	Late 17th century	22 May 1954	TF0318406613; 52°38′51″N 0°28′35″W	1360407	33 St Martin's More images
6 St Peter's Hill	Stamford, South Kesteven	Jettied House	Mid 17th century	22 May 1954	TF0269507024; 52°39′04″N 0°29′00″W	1360019	6 St Peter's Hill More images
4 St Mary's Place	Stamford, South Kesteven	House	Late 18th century	22 May 1954	TF0307307023; 52°39′04″N 0°28′40″W	1360027	4 St Mary's Place More images
47–50 St Martin's	Stamford, South Kesteven	House	Early 18th century	22 May 1954	TF0313106670; 52°38′53″N 0°28′37″W	1360411	47–50 St Martin's More images
66 and 67 St Martins	Stamford, South Kesteven	House	17th century	22 May 1954	TF0306506815; 52°38′57″N 0°28′41″W	1360414	66 and 67 St Martins More images
30 St Martin's	Stamford, South Kesteven	House	Mid 18th century	22 May 1954	TF0317006648; 52°38′52″N 0°28′35″W	1360406	30 St Martin's More images
4 Austin Street	Stamford, South Kesteven	House	Mid 18th century	22 May 1954	TF0269406973; 52°39′03″N 0°29′00″W	1365616	4 Austin Street More images
3 All Saints' Place	Stamford, South Kesteven	House	Early 18th century	22 May 1954	TF0286307191; 52°39′10″N 0°28′51″W	1360360	3 All Saints' Place More images
35 St Martin's	Stamford, South Kesteven	House	Early-mid 18th century	22 May 1954	TF0319906586; 52°38′50″N 0°28′34″W	1360408	35 St Martin's More images
18 Broad Street	Stamford, South Kesteven	House	Late 18th century	22 May 1954	TF0314507320; 52°39′14″N 0°28′36″W	1360374	18 Broad Street More images
14 and 15 St George's Square	Stamford, South Kesteven	House	Late 17th century	22 May 1954	TF0323807049; 52°39′05″N 0°28′31″W	1360397	14 and 15 St George's Square
19 Broad Street	Stamford, South Kesteven	House	Mid 18th century	22 May 1954	TF0315007325; 52°39′14″N 0°28′36″W	1062254	19 Broad Street More images
16 Barn Hill	Stamford, South Kesteven	House	Late 16th century	22 May 1954	TF0283507209; 52°39′10″N 0°28′53″W	1360351	16 Barn Hill More images
12 St Paul's Street	Stamford, South Kesteven	House	17th century	22 May 1954	TF0322807302; 52°39′13″N 0°28′32″W	1062942	12 St Paul's Street More images
14 Barn Hill	Stamford, South Kesteven	House	Early 19th century	22 May 1954	TF0281207215; 52°39′11″N 0°28′54″W	1147446	14 Barn Hill More images
51 St Martin's	Stamford, South Kesteven	House	Early 18th century	22 May 1954	TF0312006682; 52°38′53″N 0°28′38″W	1169273	51 St Martin's More images
7 High Street	Stamford, South Kesteven	Shop	Late 18th century	22 May 1954	TF0295807150; 52°39′08″N 0°28′46″W	1147799	7 High Street More images
25 Broad Street	Stamford, South Kesteven	House	Mid 18th century	22 May 1954	TF0314207298; 52°39′13″N 0°28′36″W	1360375	25 Broad Street
52 Broad Street	Stamford, South Kesteven	House	Mid 18th century	22 May 1954	TF0292207182; 52°39′09″N 0°28′48″W	1360378	52 Broad Street More images
13 Barn Hill	Stamford, South Kesteven	House	1740	22 May 1954	TF0280007223; 52°39′11″N 0°28′54″W	1360350	13 Barn Hill More images
21 and 21a High Street	Stamford, South Kesteven	House	Mid 18th century	22 May 1954	TF0303607188; 52°39′10″N 0°28′42″W	1360401	21 and 21a High Street More images
23 and 24 High Street	Stamford, South Kesteven	Shop	1904	22 May 1954	TF0306207216; 52°39′10″N 0°28′40″W	1062232	23 and 24 High Street More images
Gate, Screen Wall and Balustrade to West of Stoke Rochford Hall	Stoke Rochford Park, Stoke Rochford, South Kesteven	Balustrade	1841-5	9 January 1987	SK9180628016; 52°50′31″N 0°38′18″W	1306948	Upload Photo
Obelisk, Approximately 250 Metres West North West of Stoke Rochford Hall	Stoke Rochford Park, Stoke Rochford, South Kesteven	Obelisk	1847	14 July 1978	SK9158828127; 52°50′34″N 0°38′30″W	1062294	Obelisk, Approximately 250 Metres West North West of Stoke Rochford Hall More images
Church of St. Martin	Stubton, South Kesteven	Parish Church	1799	20 September 1966	SK8747648779; 53°01′45″N 0°41′50″W	1360092	Church of St. Martin More images
Castle Farm House	Swayfield, South Kesteven	Farmhouse	c. 1600	30 October 1968	SK9924822620; 52°47′31″N 0°31′47″W	1062773	Upload Photo
Church of St Nicholas	Swayfield, South Kesteven	Parish Church	12th century	30 October 1968	SK9932422644; 52°47′32″N 0°31′43″W	1360127	Church of St Nicholas More images
Parish Church of St Mary	Syston, South Kesteven	Parish Church	11th century	20 September 1966	SK9297940941; 52°57′28″N 0°37′02″W	1147012	Parish Church of St Mary More images
Bridge over River Welland	Uffington, South Kesteven	Road Bridge	Late 17th century	22 June 1987	TF0663006928; 52°38′59″N 0°25′31″W	1317255	Bridge over River Welland More images
Gates Piers and Walls to Churchyard	Uffington, South Kesteven	Gate	Late 17th century	30 October 1968	TF0616507660; 52°39′23″N 0°25′55″W	1062589	Upload Photo
Gates, Piers and Wall to Demolished Uffington House	Uffington, South Kesteven	Gate	19th century	30 October 1968	TF0616807646; 52°39′22″N 0°25′55″W	1165717	Upload Photo
Molecey's Mill and the Granary	West Deeping, South Kesteven	House	17th century	21 November 1973	TF1245209821; 52°40′28″N 0°20′18″W	1360193	Molecey's Mill and the Granary More images
The Manor House	West Deeping, South Kesteven	House	15th century	30 October 1968	TF1123508681; 52°39′52″N 0°21′24″W	1062601	Upload Photo
Church of St James	Westborough and Dry Doddington, South Kesteven	Parish Church	Early 12th century	20 September 1966	SK8498146610; 53°00′36″N 0°44′06″W	1253449	Church of St James More images
The Old Rectory	Westborough and Dry Doddington, South Kesteven	House	1984	19 February 1952	SK8506544466; 52°59′27″N 0°44′03″W	1253451	Upload Photo
Garden Wall and Doorway at Grantham House	Grantham	Garden Wall	13th century	20 April 1972	SK9154436112; 52°54′53″N 0°38′24″W	1062509	Upload Photo
George Hotel, Grantham	Grantham	Inn	Medieval	8 May 1950	SK9136235849; 52°54′44″N 0°38′34″W	1360255	George Hotel, Grantham More images
Vine House	South Kesteven	House	1764	8 May 1950	SK9136836050; 52°54′51″N 0°38′34″W	1360248	Vine House More images
War Memorial in the Churchyard of Church of St Wulfram	Grantham, South Kesteven	War Memorial	1920	20 April 1972	SK9143636144; 52°54′54″N 0°38′30″W	1062502	War Memorial in the Churchyard of Church of St Wulfram More images
