= 1894 Bourne Rural District Council election =

1894 English local government election

The Bourne Rural District Council was established in 1894 and existed until 1931, when it was abolished and replaced with the South Kesteven Rural District Council. Councillors were elected to serve on it for three-year terms. The first elections took place in December 1894. There were 43 seats on the council. All divisions returned one member, except where stated below. No members were returned for three seats, leaving only 39 councillors in place for the RDC's first meeting on 3 January 1895.

== Results ==
The full list of nominations was reported in "Bourne Union", Grantham Journal, 8 December 1894, p. 6.

| Division | Candidate | Occupation/rank | Votes | Returned | Former Guardian | Note | Ref |
|---|---|---|---|---|---|---|---|
| Aslackby | T. C. Ellis | farmer | 48 | Yes | Yes | | |
| Aslackby | Sarah Ann Waite | married woman; wife of Stephen Waite, bootmaker | 17 | No | | | |
| Baston | W. Bland | farmer | ? | Yes | | | |
| Baston | J. Dent | shopkeeper | ? | No | | | |
| Bourne (five seats) | J. Worsdall | farmer | 405 | Yes | Yes | | |
| Bourne (five seats) | E. Andrew | farmer | 330 | Yes | Yes | | |
| Bourne (five seats) | N. E. Porter | farmer | 328 | Yes | Yes | | |
| Bourne (five seats) | R. Agnew | farmer | 307 | Yes | | | |
| Bourne (five seats) | R. Brothwell | farmer | 304 | Yes | | | |
| Bourne (five seats) | Henrietta Mary Swift | married woman | 291 | No | | | |
| Bourne (five seats) | Caroline Frances Carlton | married woman | 294 | No | | | |
| Bourne (five seats) | T. Carlton | gentleman | 281 | No | Yes | | |
| Bourne (five seats) | H. Stubley | farmer | 274 | No | Yes | | |
| Castle Bytham | John William Handley Davenport-Handley | gentleman | 79 | Yes | | | |
| Castle Bytham | Thomas Lyon | farmer | 27 | No | Yes | | |
| Castle Bytham | Alfred Gordon | farmer | 15 | No | | | |
| Little Bytham | A. W. Squires | brickmaker | ? | Yes | | | |
| Little Bytham | T. Williamson | farmer | | | Yes | | |
| Birthorpe | J. Tomlinson | farmer and grazier | Unopposed | Yes | | | |
| Billingborough (two seats) | Edward Bailey | farmer of Birthorpe | 92 | Yes | Yes | | |
| Billingborough (two seats) | Moses Franklin Benton | tailor and draper | 87 | Yes | | | |
| Billingborough (two seats) | Rev. W. M. Thompson | | 58 | No | Yes | | |
| Billingborough (two seats) | John Seiles | gentleman | Disqualified | No | | Disqualified due to an error with his nomination papers | |
| Careby | – | – | – | – | – | No nominations were received | |
| Carlby | M. E. Briggs | farmer | Unopposed | Yes | Yes | | |
| Corby | Rev. C. Farebrother | vicar of Corby | 64 | Yes | | | |
| Corby | Rev. Canon Baron | | 48 | No | | Nominated by the Liberal sub-agent | |
| Creeton | J. Healey | farmer | Unopposed | Yes | | | |
| Counthorpe | T. H. Sharman | farmer | Unopposed | Yes | Yes | | |
| Deeping St James (three seats) | William Henry Smith | butcher | 86 | Yes | | | |
| Deeping St James (three seats) | John W. Huffer | poulterer | 78 | Yes | | | |
| Deeping St James (three seats) | John Edward Ward | farmer | 73 | Yes | | | |
| Deeping St James (three seats) | William Buttress | innkeeper/cottager and poultry dealer | 61 | No | | | |
| Deeping St James (three seats) | William Henry King | furrier | 29 | No | | | |
| Market Deeping (two seats) | G. G. Vergette | farmer | Unopposed | Yes | Yes | | |
| Market Deeping (two seats) | J. Thorpe | miller | Withdrew? | No | Yes | His name was included in the list of nominees published on 8 December, but was missing of the list published on 14 December. It was reported in January 1895 that only one of the seats had been filled. | |
| Dowsby | A. W. Dean | farmer and grazier | Unopposed | Yes | Yes | | |
| Dunsby | T. Pick | farmer | Unopposed | Yes | Yes | | |
| Edenham | W. Rowe | baker | 38 | Yes | | | |
| Edenham | W. Gordon | farmer | 29 | Yes | Yes | | |
| Edenham | W. Harris | farmer | ? | No | | His vote was not mentioned in the news report at the time | |
| Folkingham | T. Watson | draper and grocer | Unopposed | Yes | | | |
| Haconby | E. J. Grummitt | farmer | Unopposed | Yes | Yes | | |
| Holywell with Aunby | J. Turner | farmer | Unopposed | Yes | Yes | | |
| Horbling | E. Smith | gentleman | Unopposed | Yes | Yes | | |
| Irnham | Conyers C. Chapman | farmer | 23 | Yes | | | |
| Irnham | J. T. Bacon of Bulby | farmer | 13 | No | Yes | | |
| Kirkby Underwood | J. A. Wilson | farmer | Unopposed | Yes | | | |
| Kirkby Underwood | Rev. B. Harman | | Withdrew | No | | Withdrew his candidacy to avoid the parish incurring the expense of a contest | |
| Laughton | – | – | – | – | – | A. Rollinson, a farmer and former Guardian, had submitted the only nomination but it was ruled invalid. | |
| Langtoft | J. W. Franks | farmer | 58 | Yes | | | |
| Langtoft | G. A. Peasgood | farmer | 29 | No | Yes | | |
| Manthorpe | – | – | – | – | – | J. Holmes, a farmer and former Guardian, had submitted the only nomination but it was ruled invalid. | |
| Morton | Robert Rodgers | farmer | ? | Yes | | | |
| Morton | John Hind | farmer | | | | | |
| Pointon | T. Casswell | farmer and grazier | Unopposed | Yes | Yes | | |
| Rippingale | W. Bacon | farmer | Unopposed | Yes | Yes | | |
| Swayfield | J. S. Sharp | farmer | Unopposed | Yes | | | |
| Swinstead | C. J. Elvidge | farmer | Unopposed | Yes | | | |
| Sempringham | D. J. Millington | farmer and grazier | Unopposed | Yes | Yes | | |
| Thurlby | W. Hayes | farmer | Unopposed | Yes | Yes | | |
| Toft-cum-Lound | J. Sneath | farmer | ? | Yes | Yes | | |
| Toft-cum-Lound | E. Alford | carpenter | | | | | |
| Wytham-on-the-Hill | J. W. Lloyd | farmer | ? | Yes | Yes | | |
| Wytham-on-the-Hill | Louisa Moxen | farmer | | No | | | |

== Aftermath ==
The first meeting of the newly elected council was held on 3 January 1895 and all but three members – Robert Agnew (Bourne), A. W. Dean (Dowsby) and D. J. Millington (Sempringham) – were present. Captain E. Smith (Horbling) acted as temporary chairman and the clerk read out instructions from the Local Government Board. The council then unanimously elected its first chairman, Thomas Pick, who was proposed by W. Hayes and seconded by J. Davenport-Handley. With Pick in the chair, the council then unanimously elected its first vice-chairman, W. Hayes, who was proposed by E. J. Grummitt and J. Worsdall.
