= Dowsby Hall =

Dowsby Hall, Lincolnshire
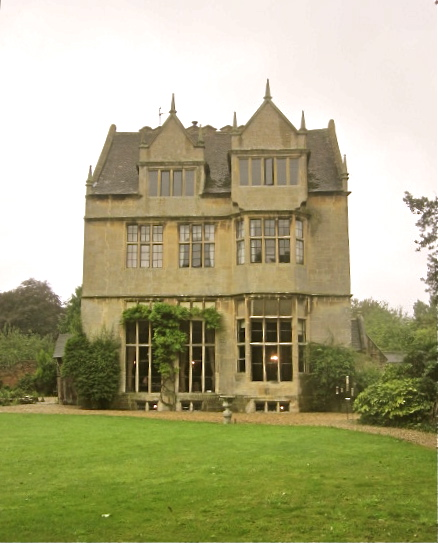
- Dowsby Hall from E.

- Location within Lincolnshire
- 52.8498°N 0.3524°W
- Location: Dowsby, near Bourne, Lincolnshire
- OS grid reference: TF1105229307

History
- Built: between c.1610-1630.
- Rebuilt: 1798, probably following demolition of s. facade of the house

Site notes
- Architect: attributed to John Thorpe
- Architectural style: Jacobean

Listed Building – Grade II*
- Designated: 6 May 1952
- Reference no.: 1317485

Dowsby Hall is an early 17th-century house situated in Dowsby, Lincolnshire, England, and 6 miles (10 km) to the north of Bourne. Originally a much grander house, attributed to the architect John Thorpe, it was converted to farm house in the late 18th century. It is listed Grade II*. From about 1920 to 1987, it was the home of Henry Burtt, who suggested the idea of the radio programme The Archers to the BBC producer Godfrey Baseley.

== History ==
The land on which the house stands was acquired by Thomas Rigdon of Chartham in Kent when he married Anne heiress of Anthony Villiers, whose mother had been a member of the Roos family, who had lived in Dowsby for eight generations. It the passed to his son Sir William Rigdon who died in 1610. At this point the property was purchased by Richard Burrell, a citizen and grocer of London. It is not clear if Sir William had started building the hall at this time or if the hall was built for Richard Burrell. An altered rainwater head, dated 1630, might even indicate that the building could be that late. The Dowsby Hall remained in Burrell ownership into the 18th. century and passed by marriage to Thomas Foster, who sold the hall with its farmland to a Mr Green in 1798. It is thought that the hall may have been in a dilapidated state by this point. John Green appears to have had demolished the southern portion of the house and the main entrance. The house was now extensively remodeled internally and the front door moved to the north side. The house had been drastically reduced in size presumably so that it would now be suitable to use as a farmhouse. It may have been at this time or earlier that some of the windows of the house had been bricked up, presumably to avoid Window tax. John Green was succeeded by James Dunn, a successful sheep breeder and then by the Dean family who successfully exported sheep to Argentina and they gave the village its church clock and the village hall as a First World War Memorial.

Around 1920 the Dowsby Hall estate was purchased by Trinity College, Cambridge and Henry Burtt became the tenant farmer. Burtt was a substantial and innovative farmer, farming land in Dowsby, Rippingale and elsewhere. At one point Burtt was the largest producer of blackcurrants in Britain- his blackcurrants were juiced to provide fruit juice for Ribena- and was the moving force for the establishment of the Lincolnshire Quality seed scheme, which was a forerunner of worldwide seed quality control. In 1946, the BBC Radio producer Godfrey Baseley, later to become first editor of The Archers, came to Rippingale to make a programme called Farm Visit. Henry Burtt and his son Stephen showed him their land all round Rippingale and explained their unusual crops and methods. Two years later, the BBC organised a national conference, to discuss how to get more farmers listening to radio. It took place in Birmingham Town Hall on 3 June 1948 and produced nothing new until Burtt stood up and famously said: "What we want is a farming ‘Dick Barton'," and sat down again, to laughter from the audience. Burtt then worked with Baseley on the idea and Baseley seems to have modelled the characters of Dan and Phil Archer on Henry Burtt and his son Stephen. Henry Burtt died in 1987 at the age of 94, and in that year Trinity College sold Dowsby Hall, but retained the surrounding farmland.

== Architecture ==
=== Description ===
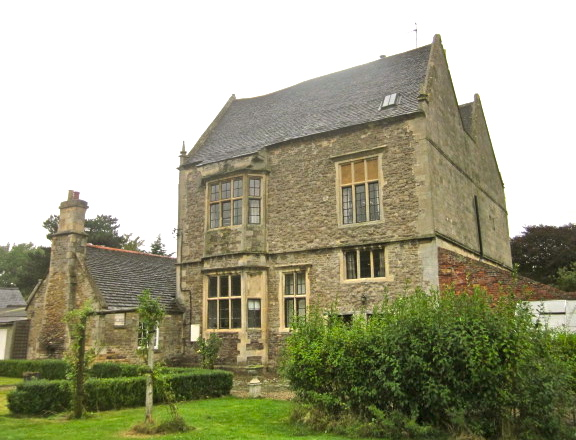
Dowsby Hall, West elevation

The front of the house is in limestone-based ashlar on the east facade and the rebuilt south face, while the north and west sides are in coursed Rubble masonry. The source of the limestone is likely to be from the Ancaster stone or Heydour quarries. A three-storey house double pile house, with ridge roofs with stone coped gables, crowned with small knopped obelisks. Four chimney stacks in central valley between roofs, one with 3 tall angle shafts, the other 3 with tall paired angle shafts.

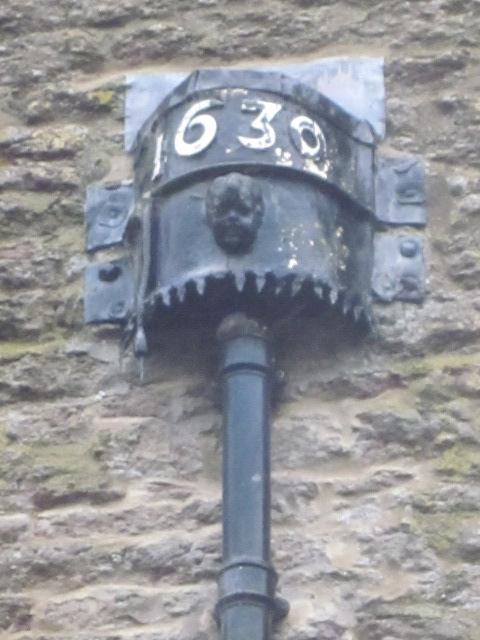
Rainwater head, Dowsby Hall dated 1630

Rainwater head or Launder box dated 1630 drains the gulley between the parallel ridges on the north side. Four southern bays of the original seven bay east front demolished in the late 18th century leaving three northern bays. Mullioned windows, some of which have recently been re-fenestrated, having been previously blocked with brick. Projecting moulded cornice above corbelled out bay window at third-floor level above the canted or bay oriel windows of the first and second floors. A similar moulded cornice crowned with a gablet with obelisks on apex and kneelers above the windows of the two other remaining bays.

Inside a billiards room with 17th. century oak fielded panelling with chamfered beam and small panelled cupboard doors flanking fireplace. The original hall has been split with the insertion of an early 18th. century bolection moulded panelled dining room and a mid-18th. century marbled panelled drawing room.

=== Architectural attribution ===
There is considerable uncertainty as to who was the architect of Dowsby Hall and for whom it was built. David Roberts in his original study published in 1973, reconstructed the frontage and layout of the Hall. He suggested on comparison with similarities in drawings in John Thorpe's book of plans in the Sir John Soane Museum that John Thorpe is likely to have been the architect of Dowsby Hall. John Thorpe has been accepted as the architect in subsequent published literature. Sir Howard Colvin cautions against too readily accepting Thorpe as the architect, as his book of plans contains new projects, surveys of existing buildings, and others that are probably copies of designs by other surveyors. One of the plans also shows alterations, which may imply that another architect was involved in the design of house and the plans were changed.

== Literature ==
- Antram N (revised), Pevsner N & Harris J, (1989), The Buildings of England: Lincolnshire, Yale University Press. pp. 979
- Colvin Sir H. A (1995), Biographical Dictionary of British Architects 1600-1840. Yale University Press, 3rd edition London, pg.1140.pp. 258–9
- Leach T. R. (1991), Lincolnshire Country Houses and their Families (part 2), pp 99–100.
- Roberts D.L. (1973),"John Thorpe's Designs for Dowsby Hall and the Red Hall, Bourne", Lincolnshire History and Archaeology. viii 1973
- Roberts D L (ed. Shaun Tyas), (2018), Lincolnshire Houses, Tyas, Donnington. pp. 314–15 & 344–7. ISBN 9781900289719.
- Summerson Sir J 1966, ed. "The Book of Architecture of John Thorpe". Walpole Society Volume XL,.
