= Aunby =

Village in Lincolnshire, England

Coordinates: 52.7189°N 0.4894°W

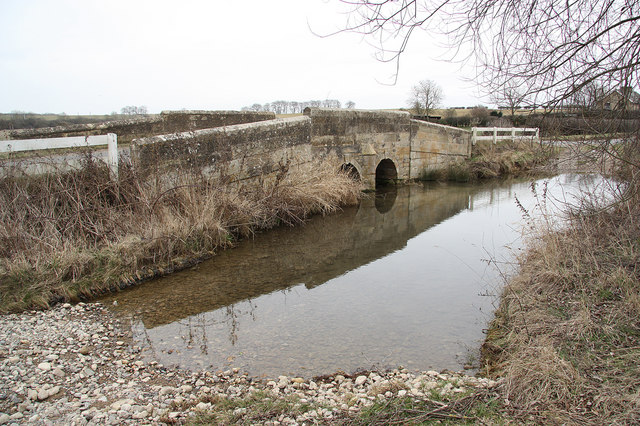
- Ford and bridge over the River Glen near Aunby. This tributary of the West Glen is fed from the lakes at Holywell.

- Location within Lincolnshire
- OS grid reference: TF021146
  - London: 85 mi (137 km) S
- Civil parish: Careby Aunby and Holywell
- District: South Kesteven
- Shire county: Lincolnshire
- Region: East Midlands
- Country: England
- Sovereign state: United Kingdom
- Post town: Stamford
- Postcode district: PE9
- Police: Lincolnshire
- Fire: Lincolnshire
- Ambulance: East Midlands
- UK Parliament: Grantham and Stamford (UK Parliament constituency)

Aunby is a village in the civil parish of Careby Aunby and Holywell, in the South Kesteven district of Lincolnshire, England. It is situated north from Stamford on the B1176 road, and just south of Careby. In 1921 the parish had a population of 42. Aunby was formerly in the parish of Castle Bytham, in 1866 Aunby became a separate civil parish, on 1 April 1931 the parish was abolished to form "Careby, Aunby and Holywell".

Aunby consists of Manor and Lodge farms, and a deserted medieval village. The River Glen flows to the east of the village, next to the East Coast Main Line. Close to the west is Rutland.
