= St Andrew's Church, Rippingale =

Anglican Church in Rippingale, England

Coordinates: 52.836655°N 0.37182659°W

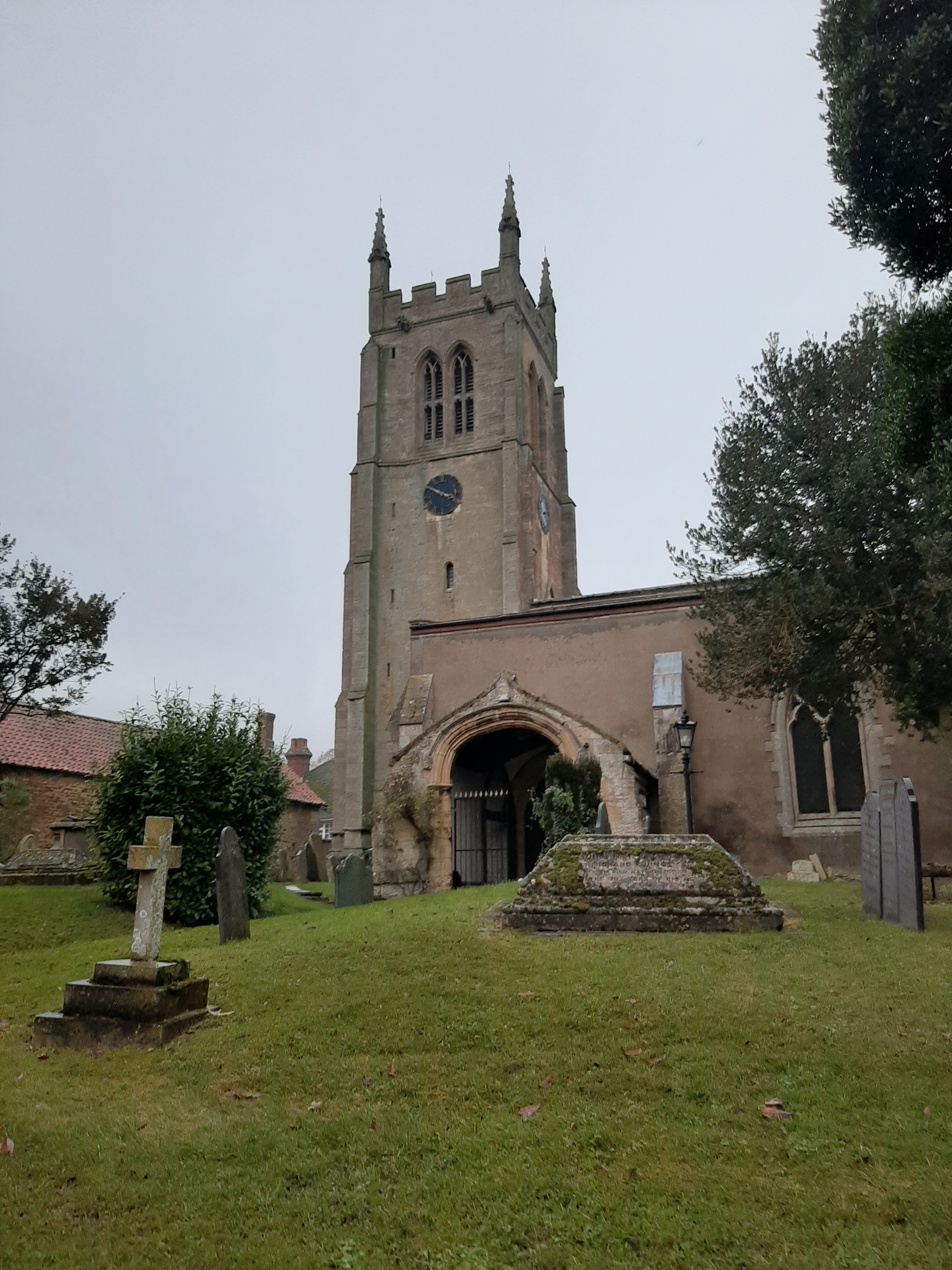
- View of the entrance and tower from the south
- St Andrew's Church, Rippingale
- OS grid reference: TF 09780 27815
- Country: England
- Denomination: Church of England

History
- Dedication: Saint Andrew

Administration
- Province: Canterbury
- Diocese: Lincoln
- Deanery: Deanery of Lafford

Clergy
- Rector: Neil Bullen

The Church of St Andrew in Rippingale, Lincolnshire, England, is a Grade I–listed Anglican church.

== History ==
The earliest phase of the church dates back to the mid-13th Century (c. 1250). By around 1300 and into the 14th century, further construction was undertaken, with a major phase c. 1350. A restoration was carried out in 1860.

A church on the site is believed to have existed by the time of the Domesday Survey (1086), though no visible remains of that structure survive.

== Architecture ==
=== Exterior ===
The building is constructed in coursed limestone rubble with some limestone ashlar, and includes some red brick and rendered elements. It is roofed in lead and has stone-coped gables with cross finials. Its plan comprises a west tower, nave, a full-length broad south aisle, south porch, and chancel. The tower is dated to the mid 15th century and displays typical Perpendicular Gothic features including multi-stage angle buttresses and decorative shield friezes.

=== Interior ===
Inside, the nave and south aisle are separated by an arcade of six pointed arches on compound piers, indicative of the 14th-century work. The church contains a font of mellowed stone from the early 15th century. The churchyard includes a war memorial in limestone, erected after the First World War; by 2006 it had deteriorated and a refurbishment scheme was undertaken.

== Listing and heritage status ==
St Andrew’s is listed as Grade I (List Entry Number 1260603) on the National Heritage List for England; the listing date is 30 October 1968. The listing summary notes the building phases: "Mid C13, c.1300, c.1350, mid C15, C16, restored 1860".

== Present day ==
The church forms part of the Ringstone-in-Aveland Group of Churches in the Diocese of Lincoln. Services are held in the parish at regular intervals (1st, 2nd & 4th Sundays of the month) and the building is open to visitors from Easter until autumn; at other times the key is available from churchwardens. The south aisle floor was once excavated and replaced with redundant headstones in order to create a refreshment and social area.

== Notable features ==
- The 15th-century tower, visible from the fenland, is a distinctive landmark for the village, captured on the village sign.
- A sundial (replacement installed 2001) in the churchyard, replicating one originally installed in 1793.
- Inside the church is a parish bier thought to date from around 1900, displayed in the church.
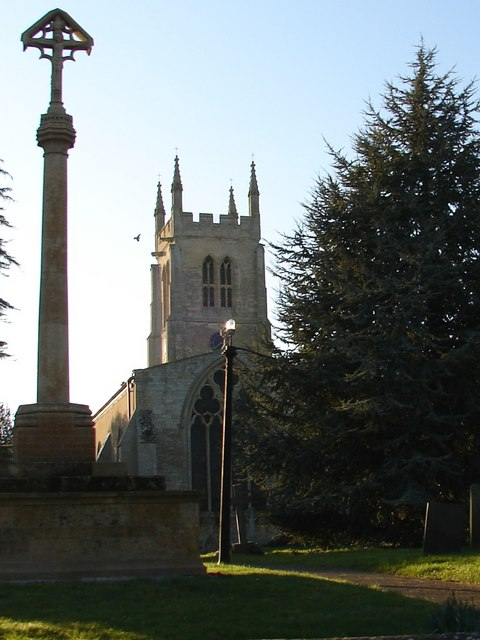

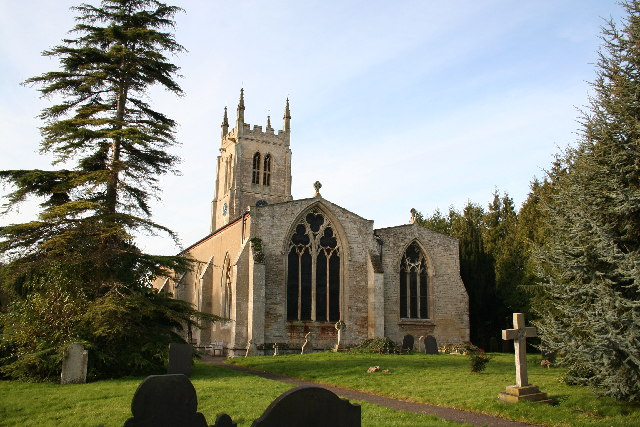

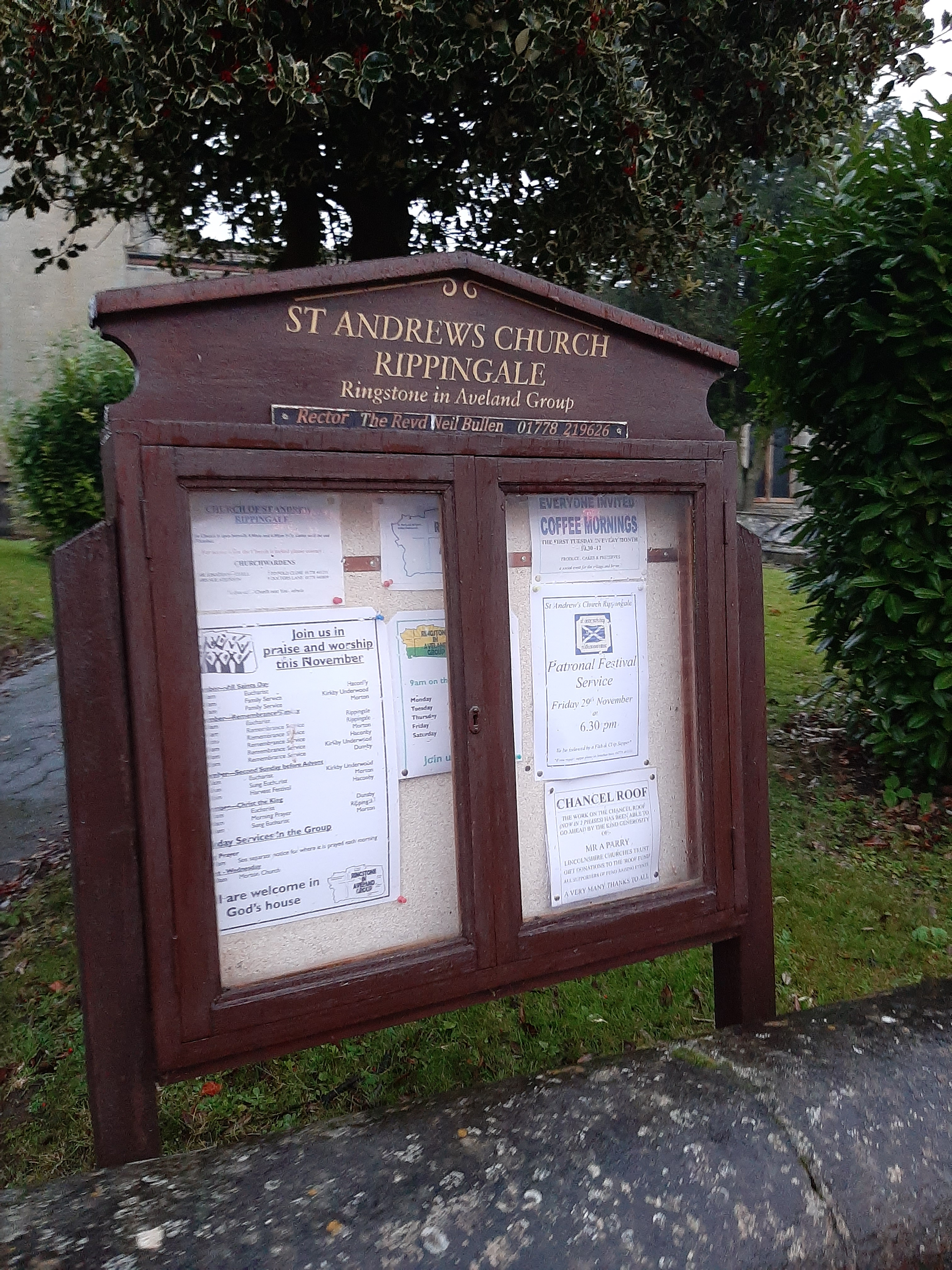

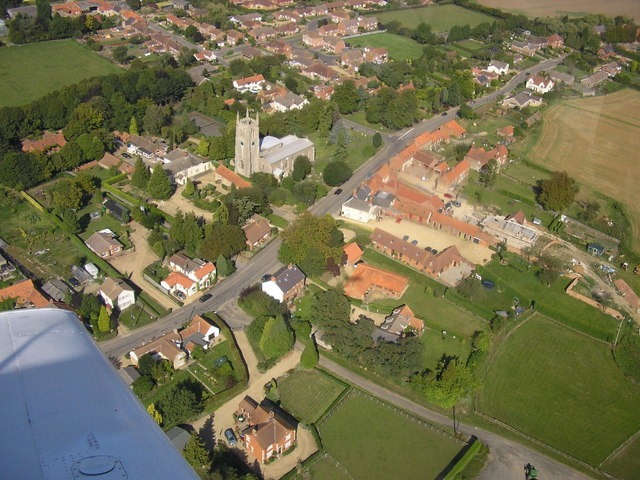
