= Uffington Rural District =

Former district of Lincolnshire

Coordinates: 52.67°N 0.40°W

- Former rural district
- Location within Lincolnshire
- Ceremonial county: Lincolnshire
- Region: East Midlands
- Country: England
- Sovereign state: United Kingdom
- Police: Lincolnshire
- Fire: Lincolnshire
- Ambulance: East Midlands

Uffington was a rural district in Lincolnshire, Parts of Kesteven, England from 1894 to 1931.

It was created in 1894 from that part of the Stamford rural sanitary district which was in Kesteven (the rest forming part of either Ketton Rural District in Rutland, Easton on the Hill Rural District in Northamptonshire, or Barnack Rural District in the Soke of Peterborough).

It covered the following parishes:

- Barholm
- Braceborough
- Greatford
- Stowe
- Tallington
- Uffington
- West Deeping
- Wilsthorpe

It was abolished by a County Review Order in 1931, and went to form part of the South Kesteven Rural District.
