= Rippingale railway station =

Former railway station in Lincolnshire, England

Rippingale
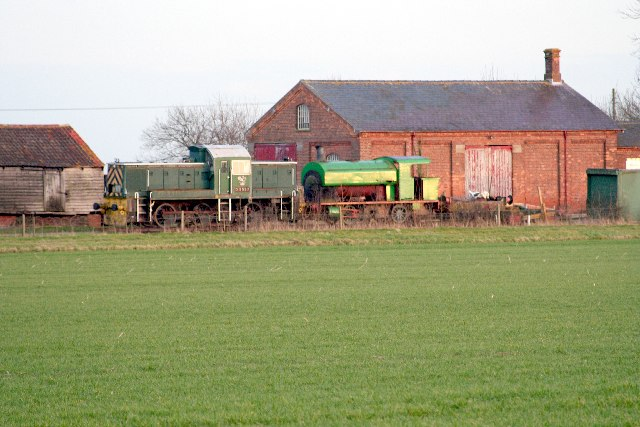
- Railway memorabilia at Rippingale station, now a private home

General information
- Location: Rippingale, Lincolnshire; England
- Coordinates: 52.83992°N 0.34593°W
- Grid reference: TF115282

Other information
- Status: Disused

History
- Original company: Great Northern Railway
- Pre-grouping: Great Northern Railway
- Post-grouping: LNER

Key dates
- 1872: opened
- 1930: closed (passengers)
- 15 June 1964: closed (goods)
Location

Rippingale railway station was a station serving the villages of Rippingale, Dowsby and Dunsby, Lincolnshire on the Great Northern Railway Bourne and Sleaford railway. It opened in 1872 and closed to passengers in 1930. The section from Bourne through Rippingale to Billingborough remained open for goods until 1964.

The station building is now a private residence.

Preceding station	Disused railways	Following station
Billingborough and Horbling; Line and station closed	Great Northern Railway; Bourne and Sleaford Railway	Morton Road; Line and station closed
