= Morton Road railway station =

Former railway station in Lincolnshire, England

Morton Road
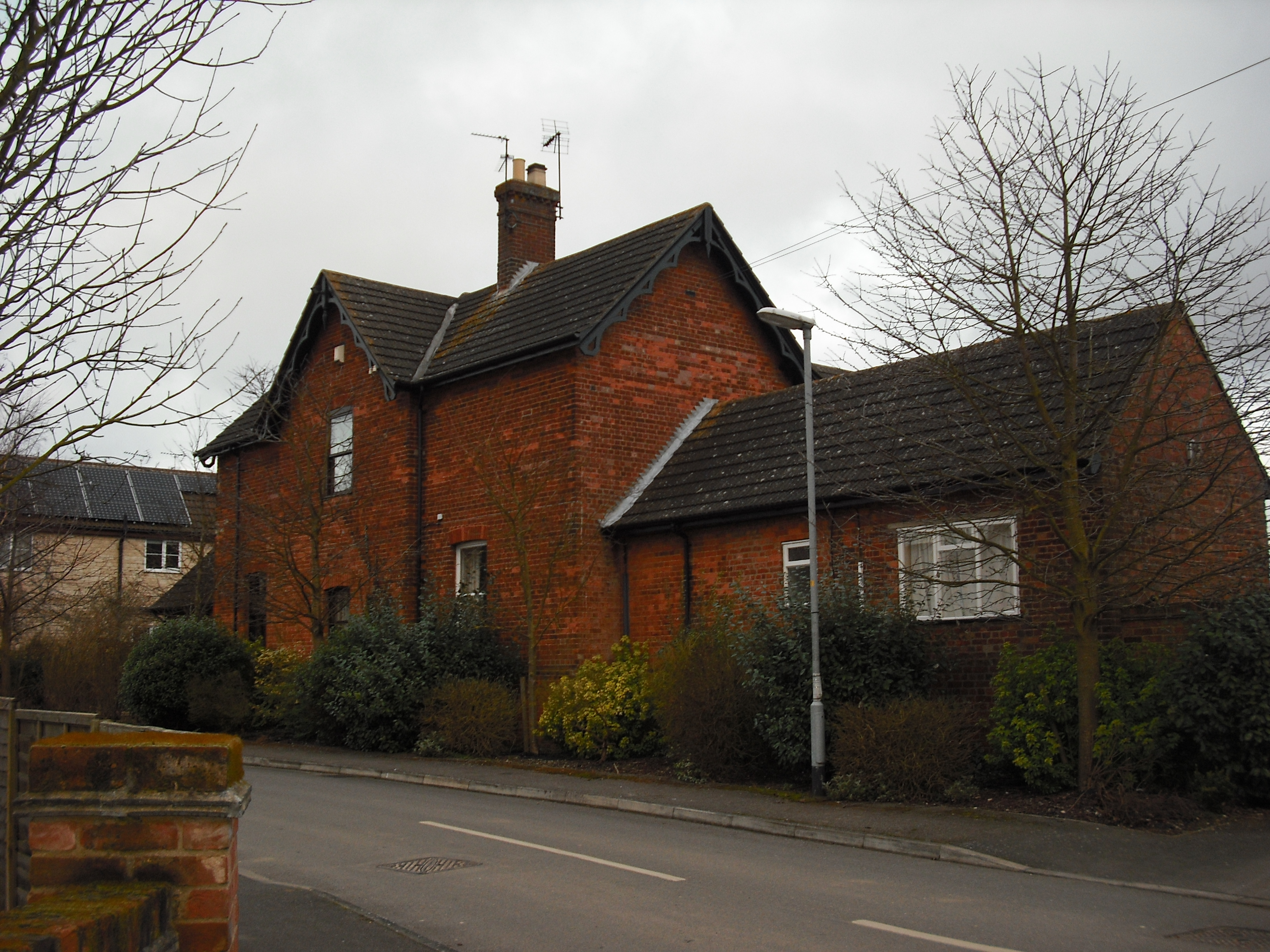
- The station building, now a house.

General information
- Location: Morton by Bourne, South Kesteven; England
- Coordinates: 52.8010°N 0.3615°W
- Grid reference: TF105239
- Platforms: 1

Other information
- Status: Disused

History
- Original company: Great Northern Railway
- Pre-grouping: Great Northern Railway
- Post-grouping: LNER

Key dates
- 1872: opened
- 1930: closed (passengers)
- 5 April 1965: closed (goods)
Location

Morton Road railway station was a station serving the village of Morton, Lincolnshire on the Great Northern Railway Bourne and Sleaford railway. It opened in 1872 and closed to passengers in 1930. The section from Bourne through Morton to Billingborough remained open for goods until 1965.

Following closure the station buildings and yard were used for a local crawler tractor distributor. The main building is now a private residence and a housing development Old Station Yard now occupies the rest of the site.

== Route ==
Preceding station	Disused railways	Following station
Rippingale	Great Northern Railway; Bourne and Sleaford Railway	Bourne
