= St Martin's Without =

Civil parish in Cambridgeshire, England

Coordinates: 52.641°N 0.463°W

- Location within Cambridgeshire
- Population: 46 (2001 census)
- Civil parish: St Martin's Without
- Unitary authority: Peterborough
- Ceremonial county: Cambridgeshire
- Region: East
- Country: England
- Sovereign state: United Kingdom
- Post town: Stamford
- Postcode district: PE9
- Police: Cambridgeshire
- Fire: Cambridgeshire
- Ambulance: East of England

St Martin's Without is a civil parish in the Peterborough unitary authority, in the ceremonial county of Cambridgeshire, England.

It was originally created in 1889 under the Local Government Act 1888 from the part of the Stamford Baron St Martin parish which was outside the municipal boundary of Stamford. It became part of the Barnack Rural District of the Soke of Peterborough, geographically part of Northamptonshire from 1894, and under the Local Government Act 1972 has formed part of the Peterborough district of Cambridgeshire since 1974.

The parish contains parts of Burghley Park.
