= Stamford Town Hall =

Municipal building in Stamford, Lincolnshire, England

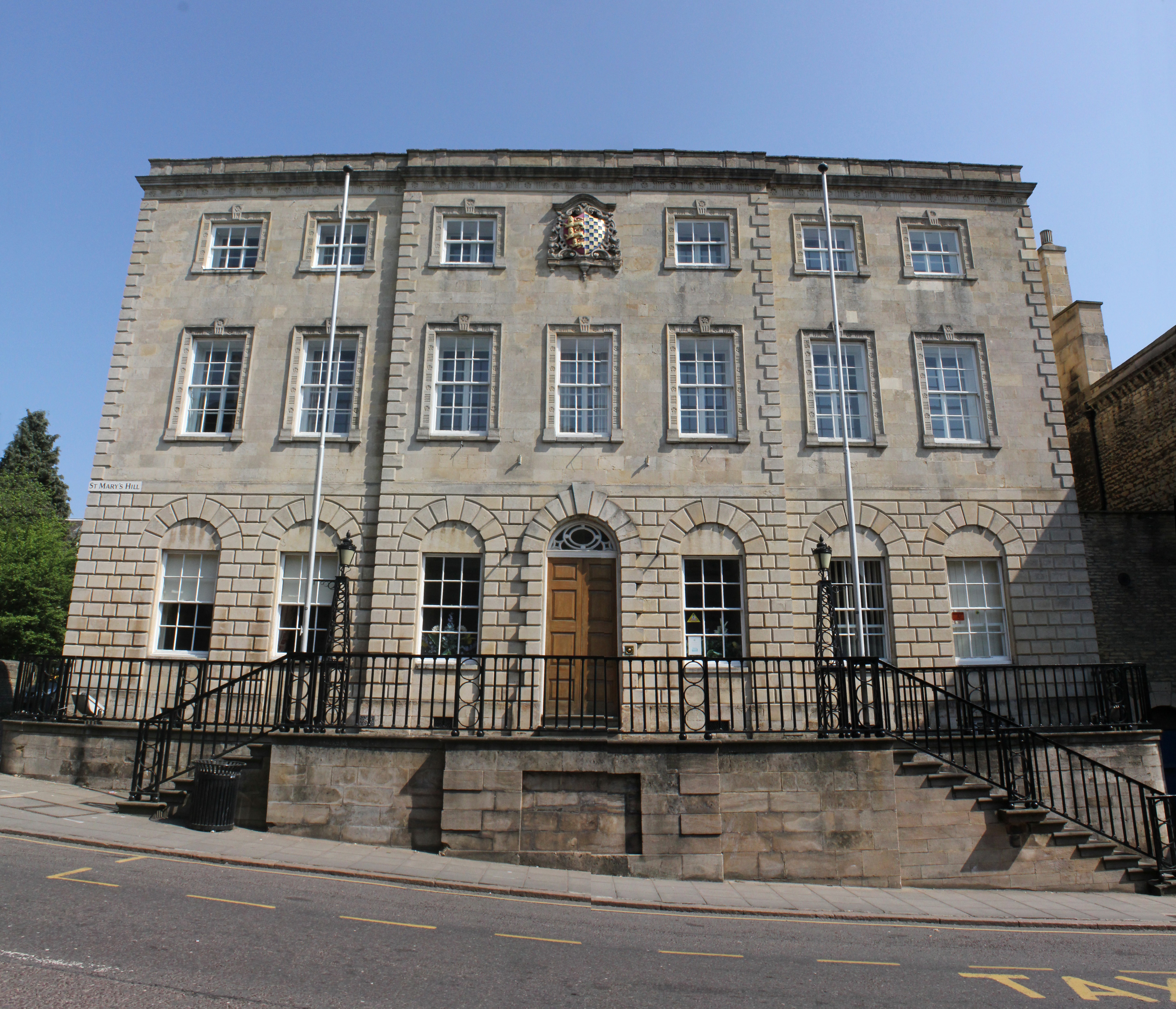
- Stamford Town Hall

- Shown in Lincolnshire
- 52.6511°N 0.4780°W
- Location: St Mary's Hill, Stamford

History
- Built: 1779

Site notes
- Architect: Henry Tatam
- Architectural style: Neoclassical style

Listed Building – Grade II*
- Official name: Town Hall
- Designated: 22 May 1954
- Reference no.: 1306544

Stamford Town Hall is a municipal building in St Mary's Hill, Stamford, Lincolnshire, England. The building, which is the headquarters of Stamford Town Council, is a Grade II* listed building.

== History ==
The first town hall in Stamford was formed by a first-floor room in the gatehouse, located on the north side of the bridge across the River Welland, which was completed in 1558. The Wansford Road Turnpike Trustees decided in the 1774 that the gatehouse was an impediment to traffic over the bridge and lobbied for its demolition; civic leaders agreed to this on condition that the trustees contribute to the cost of a new town hall building. A significant contribution was also provided by the local member of parliament, Henry Cecil.

The foundation stone for the new building was laid in 1776. It was designed in the neoclassical style, probably by Henry Tatam, built in locally sourced ashlar stone and completed in 1779. The design involved a symmetrical main frontage with seven bays facing onto St Mary's Hill; the central section of three bays, which slightly projected forward, featured a doorway with a fanlight flanked by two round-headed windows on the ground floor; there were three sash windows on the first floor and a coat of arms flanked by two smaller sash windows on the second floor. The outer sections were fenestrated in a similar style and, at roof level, there was a cornice and a parapet. Internally, the principal rooms were the courtroom and the mayor's parlour. A prison was also established in the building, but the cells were very small and the conditions extremely poor and it ceased operating in 1878. The part of the building which had operated as a prison was converted into a council chamber in the early 20th century.

The Phillips Room, named after the brewer, Joseph Phillips, was created to accommodate a collection of books bought for the town, following Phillips's death in 1902. The terrace in front of the building with steps and railing was constructed to a design by Marshall Sisson in 1952 and the Malcolm Sargent Room, named after the composer, Sir Malcolm Sargent, was created to display memorabilia given to the town by Sargent's family, following his death in 1967.

The building continued to serve as the headquarters of Stamford Borough Council until it was abolished in 1974 when district-level functions passed to the new South Kesteven District Council. The building continues to be used by Stamford Town Council, a successor parish council created in 1974 covering the former borough of Stamford. The building was also used as a magistrates' court until HM Courts and Tribunals Service vacated the building in 2010. After the Stamford Museum in Broad Street closed in 2011, some of the exhibits were transferred to the town hall, for visitors to see.

Works of art in the town hall include a painting depicting bull-running in Stamford, a practice which only died out after a ruling by the Court of the Queen's Bench, which prohibited it, in 1838.

== See also ==
- Grade II* listed buildings in South Kesteven
