= Holywell Hall, Lincolnshire =

Country house in Lincolnshire, England

Coordinates: 52°43′58″N 0°31′14″W

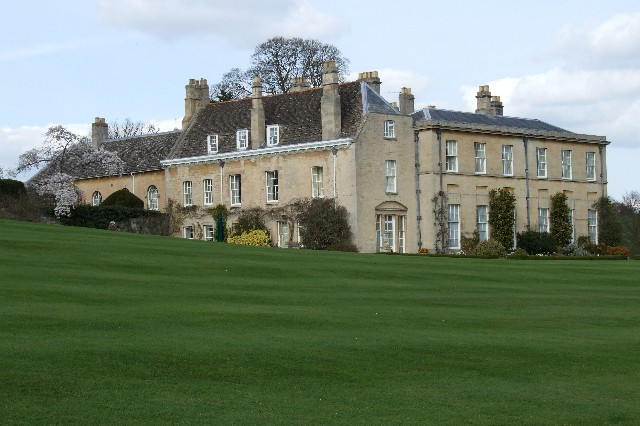
Holywell Hall

Holywell Hall is a building of historical significance in Lincolnshire and is listed on the English Heritage Register. The house is in the civil parish of Careby Aunby and Holywell in the district of South Kesteven, south-west Lincolnshire, in England. It is a 17th-century country house which was built by the Goodhall family and then purchased by the Reynardson family who owned it for the next two hundred years. It is a Grade II* listed building and now a venue for special events particularly weddings.

== Early owners ==
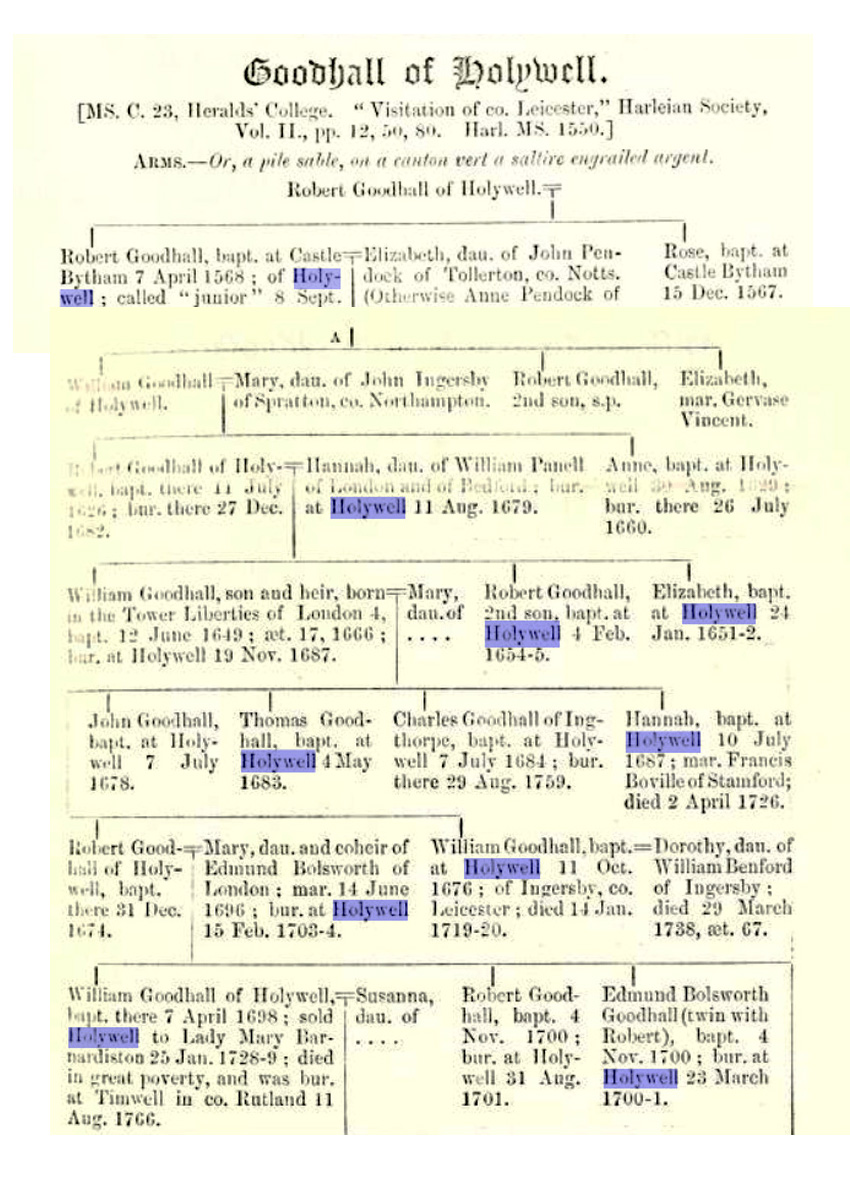
Goodhall Pedigree Chart

Records show that there has been a manor at Holywell since the 12th century or earlier and a well is still present beneath an old yew tree near the lake. In 1575 Holywell was purchased by Robert Goodhall and later his family built a large L-shaped house of which the core and a gable end remain. The Goodhall family were wealthy landowners and their pedigree chart is shown. By 1729 however they experienced financial hardship and it was decided to sell Holywell Hall. Lady Mary Barnardiston bought the property and gave it to her nephew Samuel Reynardson. She also made him trustee of her very large fortune.

Samuel Reynardson (1704-1797) was born in 1704. His father was Jacob Reynardson (1652-1719) and his grandfather was Sir Abraham Reynardson, the Lord Mayor of London. In 1732 at the time of his marriage to Sarah Knipe (1706-1763) he made substantial alterations and additions to Holywell Hall. He later commissioned the astronomer and landscape architect Thomas Wright to lay out the extensive gardens.

When Samuel died in 1797 his son Jacob Reynardson (1742-1811) inherited the house. In 1777 he married Anne Cust, daughter of Sir John Cust, 3rd Baronet of Belton House whose picture is shown at this reference. The couple had no sons so their eldest daughter Etheldred Ann Reynardson inherited the property when Jacob died in 1811. She married in 1806 General Thomas Birch who took the additional name of Reynardson when the couple became the owners of Hollywell Hall.

General Thomas Birch Reynardson (1773-1847) had a distinguished military career. He rose rapidly through the ranks of 16th Light Dragoons and in 1800 received a medal. He was fond of reading books and was interested in poetry and on one occasion in 1820 invited the famous poet John Clare to Holywell Hall. Clare recorded his visit in his diary in the following terms.

General Birch Reynardson expressed a desire to see me and invited me to come to Holywell which I did in the beginning of April. It was a pleasant day for the season and I found the scenery of Holywell very beautiful. He showed me his library which was the largest I had seen and he pulled out of the crammed shelves a thin Quarto beautifully bound in red morocco. He said they were love elegies written by his father and of course in his mind were beautiful.

I then went to see the garden and strolled a little about the park. A little river went sweeping along and in one place General Birch Reynardson was forming a connection with it to form an island. In one sunny spot was a large dial and near it under the shadows of some evergreens was a bird house built in the form of a cage – glass all around and full of canaries that were fluttering about busily employed in building their nests.

Shortly after his visit Clare was inspired to write a poem called “Holywell” which he published in his 1821 book of poems. This poem can be read at this reference.

== Later owners ==
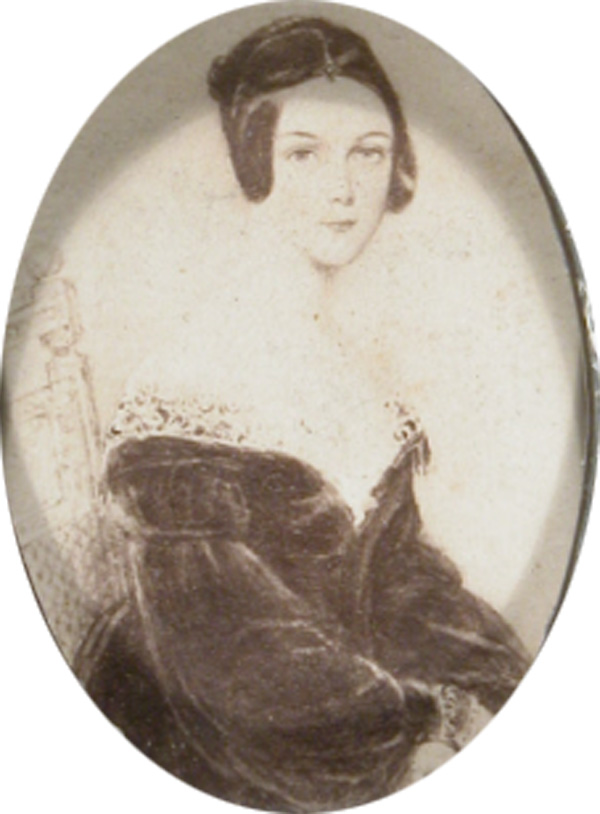
Anne Reynardson (formerly Yorke)

When General Birch Reynardson died in 1847 his son Charles Thomas Samuel Birch Reynardson (1810-1889) inherited Holywell Hall. He was educated at the University of Cambridge. In 1855 he married Anne Yorke, daughter of Simon Yorke of Erddig, Denbighshire. Her picture is shown. The couple had one son and three daughters. Charles had a strong interest in driving coaches and he wrote a book called “Down the Road: Reminiscences of a Gentleman Coachman”. When Charles died in 1889 his son Charles Birch Reynardson inherited the property.

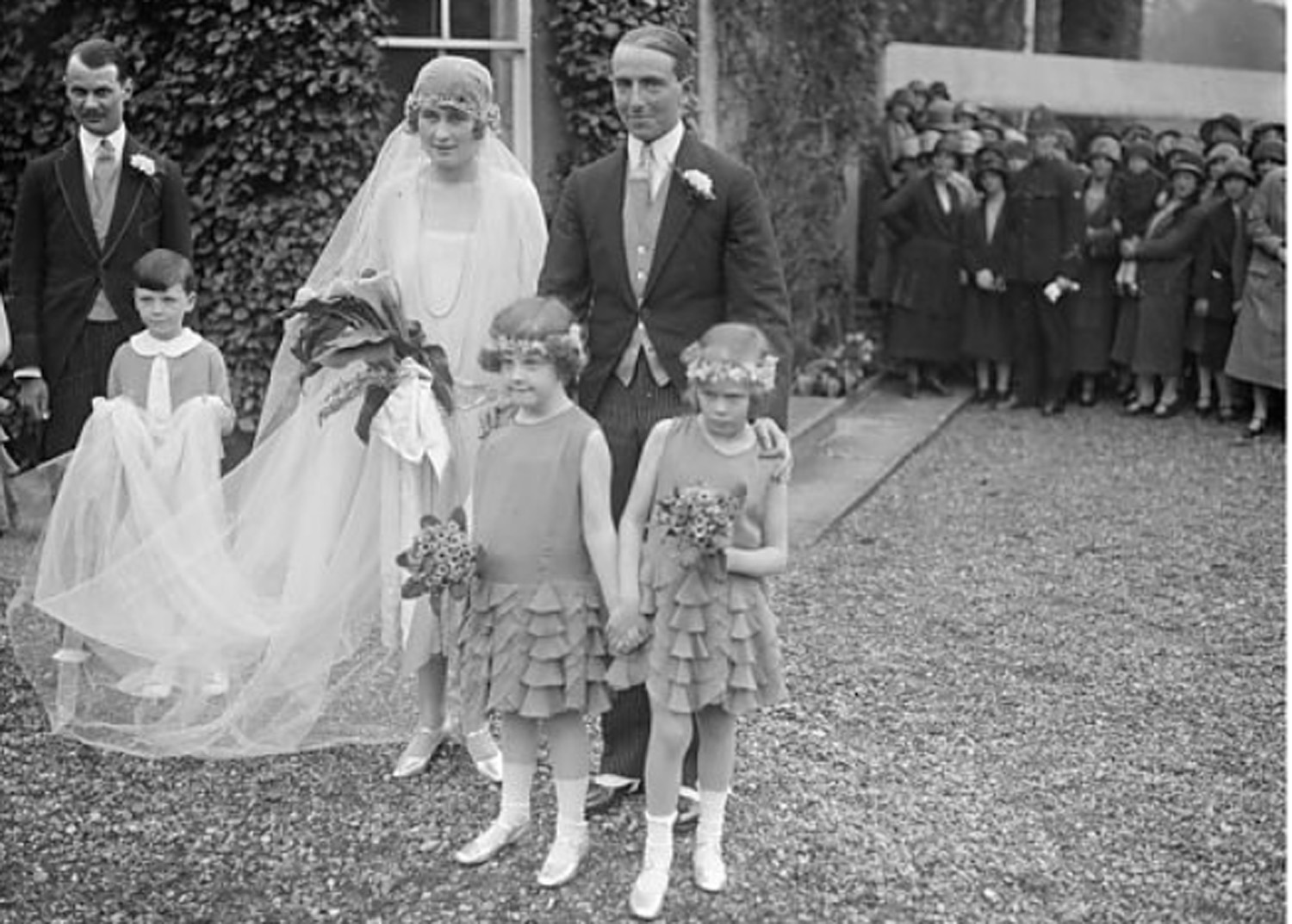
Wedding of Agatha Isabel Acland-Hood-Reynardson at Holywell Hall in 1926

Colonel Charles Birch Reynardson (1845-1919) was an officer in the Grenadier Guards. In 1875 he married Emma Maria Stracey. The couple had two daughters. Their eldest daughter Miriam inherited Holywell when Charles died in 1919. She had previously married in 1896 Arthur Acland Hood (1859-1929) the son of Sir Alexander Fuller-Acland-Hood, 3rd Baronet. When the couple became the owners of the property they changed their name to Acland Hood Reynaldson in accordance with the terms of the inheritance. They had one son and one daughter. Unfortunately their son died in the War in 1916. Their only surviving child was Agatha.

Agatha Isabel Acland-Hood-Reynardson (1903-1993) married Major Hon. Mountjoy John Charles Wedderburn Fane in 1926. The event was held at Holywell Hall and was widely reported in the newspapers. One account is as follows.

"One of the most interesting society weddings of the season was that solemnised today at St Marys Church Holywell near Stamford when the Hon. Mountjoy Fane of Little Ponton Hall Grantham, younger son of the late Earl and Countess of Westmorland led to the alter Miss Agatha Isabel Acland-Hood-Reynardson of Holywell Hall Stamford.

Wearing a magnificent gown of crème crepe romaine bordered with silver and adorned with a girdle of diamante the bride made a radiant figure. The train to the gown also of crepe romaine was embroidered in silver and lined with pale pink chiffon. Her veil was of pink tulle and she carried lovely bouquet of arum lilies."

When her father died in 1929 Agatha inherited Holywell Hall and the couple came to live there for many years. She became the Lady of the Manor and Justice of the Peace. They were frequently mentioned in the society newspapers. In 1954 they decided to sell Holywell Hall and move to “The Old Rectory” at Careby.
