= Ketton Rural District =

Former local government area in the UK

Coordinates: 52.68°N 0.50°W

Ketton
- Ketton Rural District shown within Rutland in 1970.
- Area
  - 1911: 17,735 acres (71.77 km^{2})
  - 1961: 17,735 acres (71.77 km^{2})
- Population
  - 1901: 2,835
  - 1971: 3,639
- History
  - Origin: Rural sanitary district
  - Created: 1894
  - Abolished: 1974
  - Succeeded by: Rutland
- Status: Rural district
- Government: Ketton Rural District Council
  - HQ: Stamford
- Subdivisions
  - Type: Civil parishes

Ketton was a rural district in Rutland, England from 1894 to 1974, covering the east of the county. The district was named after the village Ketton.

The rural district was formed by the Local Government Act 1894 from the part of the Stamford rural sanitary district in Rutland. At the same time, the remainder of Stamford RSD, which lay in Lincolnshire, Northamptonshire and the Soke of Peterborough became Uffington Rural District, Easton on the Hill Rural District and Barnack Rural District respectively. The rural district council's offices remained in Stamford, Lincolnshire, outside the district.

In 1960 the Local Government Commission for England proposed the abolition of the county of Rutland. The bulk of the county was to become part of Leicestershire, with Ketton RD transferred to a greatly enlarged Cambridgeshire. The plans were not carried through, however and it was not until 1974 that the rural district was abolished by the Local Government Act 1972 and merged into a single Rutland district.

== Parishes ==
The rural district consisted of nine civil parishes:

- Clipsham
- Essendine
- Great Casterton
- Ketton
- Little Casterton
- Pickworth
- Ryhall
- Tinwell
- Tixover
