= Barnack Rural District =

Former local government area in the UK

Coordinates: 52.627°N 0.385°W

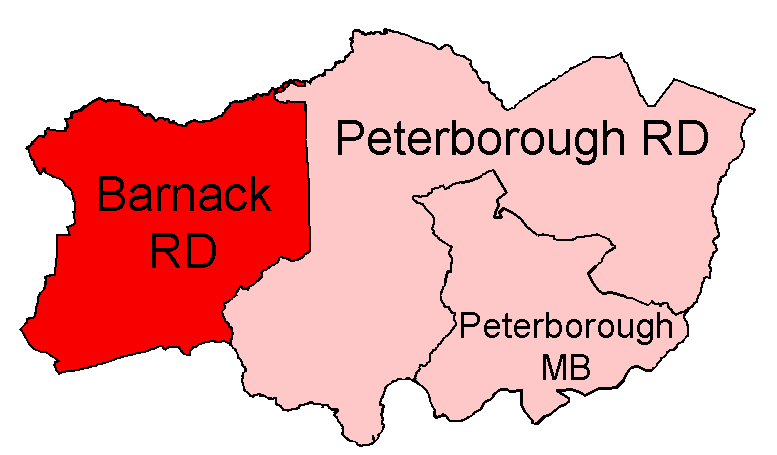
Position within Soke of Peterborough

Barnack was a rural district in the Soke of Peterborough, Northamptonshire and later Huntingdon and Peterborough from 1894 to 1974.

It was created in 1894 under the Local Government Act 1894, from that part of the Stamford rural sanitary district which was in the Soke (the rest formed either Ketton Rural District in Rutland, Easton on the Hill Rural District in Northamptonshire proper, or Uffington Rural District in Lincolnshire, Parts of Kesteven).

It included the parishes of Bainton, Barnack, Southorpe, St Martins Without, Thornhaugh, Ufford, Wansford, Wittering and Wothorpe in the Soke. It also had administrative responsibility for the parish of Sibson cum Stibbington, which was over the border in Huntingdonshire. This was made part of the Norman Cross Rural District in 1935.

It was abolished in 1974 under the Local Government Act 1972, becoming part of the larger Peterborough district in the new non-metropolitan county of Cambridgeshire.

== See also ==
- Peterborough Rural District
- Local government in Peterborough
