= Easton on the Hill Rural District =

Rural district in England

Coordinates: 52.61°N 0.51°W

Easton on the Hill was a rural district in Northamptonshire, England from 1894 to 1935. It was formed under the Local Government Act 1894 from that part of the Stamford rural sanitary district which was in Northamptonshire proper (other successor districts were Uffington Rural District in Lincolnshire, Ketton Rural District in Rutland, and Barnack Rural District in the Soke of Peterborough). It consisted of the three parishes of Collyweston, Duddington and Easton on the Hill.

The district was abolished in 1935 under a County Review Order, becoming part of the new Oundle and Thrapston Rural District.
