= Bourne Rural District =

Former rural district in Lincolnshire, England

Coordinates: 52.75°N 0.45°W

Bourne was a rural district in Lincolnshire, Parts of Kesteven from 1894 to 1931.

It was created by the Local Government Act 1894 based on the Bourne rural sanitary district. In 1931, under a County Review Order, it was abolished, with its area going to form part of the new South Kesteven Rural District.

== See also ==
- 1894 Bourne Rural District Council election
