= George Hotel, Stamford =

Coaching inn in Lincolnshire, England

Coordinates: 52°38′59″N 0°28′41″W

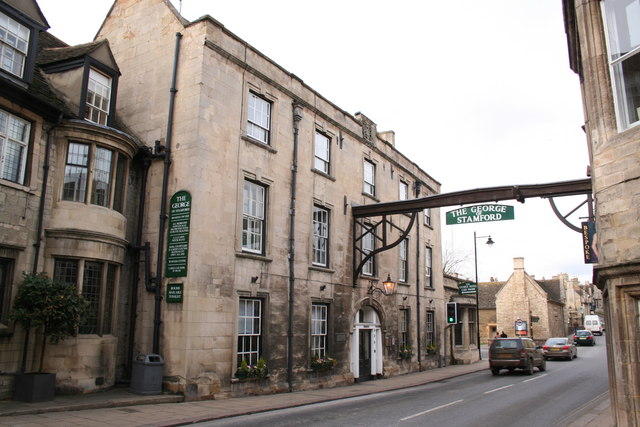
The George Hotel with its gallows sign over the road

The George Hotel is a hotel and former coaching inn on the route of the Great North Road in St Martin's, Stamford, Lincolnshire, England. The hotel itself and numbers 68 and 69 St Martin's, which has been incorporated into it are Grade II* listed buildings.

== History ==
It is possible that there was a hostelry on the site in 947 but the exact date of the current building is not known. A hospital of the Knights of St John of Jerusalem was on the site and was partly destroyed during the Wars of the Roses. The hospital was associated with Peterborough Abbey. The main block of the hotel was rebuilt, by William Cecil, 1st Baron Burghley in 1597, but may have incorporated fragments of the earlier building. In 1645 Charles I stayed at the George and other notables and sportsmen. A pit was built for cockfighting.

During the 18th century it became a busy coaching inn. Daniel Defoe, in A tour thro' the whole island of Great Britain (1724), wrote; "From hence we came to St. Martins, and stopp'd at the George, out of Curiosity, because it is reckoned one of the greatest Inns in England, and thence proceeded to Stamford." Among the customers was Daniel Lambert, one of the heaviest people in history at the time, who died in Stamford and is buried at St Martin's Church.

In August 2018 a gas explosion in the kitchen required attendance by Lincolnshire Fire and Rescue Service.

There are some reports that the hotel is haunted.

Both the main building and the adjacent 68, St Martin's, are Grade II* listed buildings.

== Architecture ==
The hotel is a three-storey stone building. The 18th-century front has a cornice and parapet with a cartouche of the arms of the Earl of Exeter. The adjacent building which is also called "The Hermitage" at numbers 68 and 69 St Martin's, which has been incorporated into the hotel as a business centre, is a two-storey building with an attic. The interior includes the remains of a mediaeval hall, probably built in the 14th century, and parts of the structure represent each of the centuries since.
