= Morton and Hanthorpe =

Civil parish in Lincolnshire, England

Coordinates: 52.802°N 0.374°W

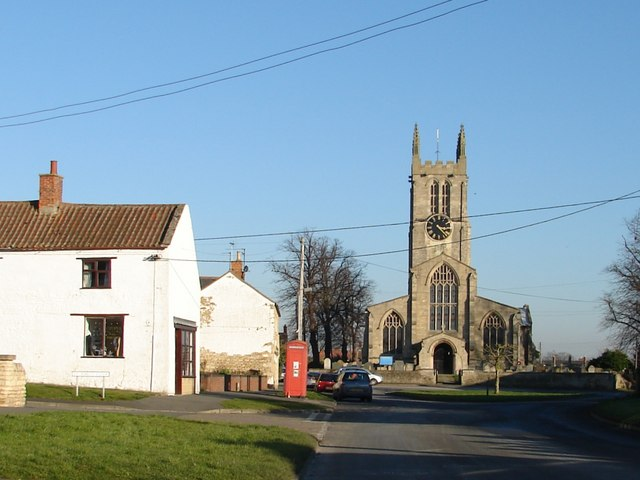
- Morton High Street

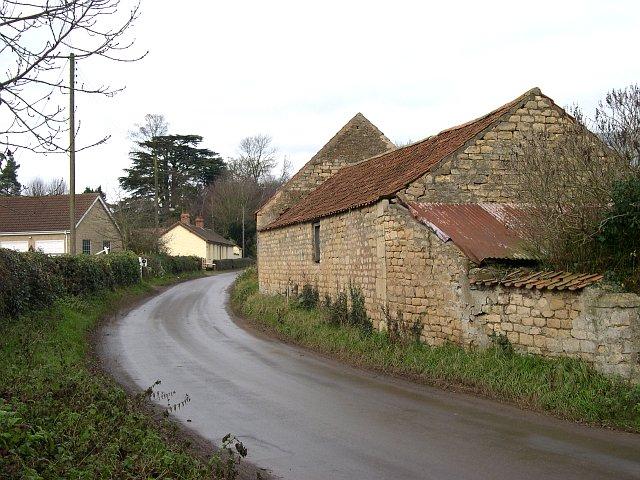
- Hanthorpe

- Location within Lincolnshire
- Population: 2,406 (2011 Census)
- OS grid reference: TF097240
  - London: 90 mi (140 km) S
- District: South Kesteven
- Shire county: Lincolnshire
- Region: East Midlands
- Country: England
- Sovereign state: United Kingdom
- Post town: BOURNE
- Postcode district: PE10
- Police: Lincolnshire
- Fire: Lincolnshire
- Ambulance: East Midlands
- UK Parliament: Grantham and Bourne

Morton and Hanthorpe is a civil parish, formerly known as Morton by Bourne, in the South Kesteven district of Lincolnshire, England. It lies 2 miles (3 km) north from Bourne, and 14 miles (23 km) south-east from Grantham. At the 2011 Census the parish had a population of 2,406.

== History ==
The village is in two parts, one each side of the fen-edge road, the A15: to the fenward side is Morton and to the upland side is Hanthorpe. The earlier name is that of Morton, from the acid peat land which the Anglian settlers found in the fen in around the year 500; they were Germanic speakers so they called it a moor. Hanthorpe is a name indicating a subsidiary settlement established in the period of the Danish settlements, probably in the tenth century.

The church and the later signs of the manorial centre are in Morton. Morton Road railway station opened in 1872 and finally closed in 1964.

A gazetteer of the 19th century states:

MORTON, a village and a parish in Bourne district, Lincoln. The village stands near Car dyke; 2½ miles N by E of Bourn r. station, and has a post office under. Bourn. The parish contains also the hamlet of Hanthorpe. Acres, 3,390. Real property, £9,382. Pop. in 1851,938; in 1861,1,008. Houses, 203. The manor belongs to the Marquis of Exeter. Hanthorpe House is the seat of W. Parker, Esq. The living is a vicarage, united with the vicarage of Hacconby, in the diocese of Lincoln. Value, £400.* Patron, the Bishop of Lincoln. The church is ancient; was restored in 1861; and consists of nave, aisles, and chancel, with a tower. There are a Baptist chapel, a free school, and charities £33.

— Imperial Gazetteer of England and Wales

George Hussey Packe, the 19th-century South Lincolnshire Member of Parliament and chairman of the Great Northern Railway, was born at Hanthorpe Hall in 1796.

On 27 August 2003 the parish was renamed from "Morton" to "Morton & Hanthorpe".

== Geography ==
Morton lies on the western margin of The Fens on three sorts of land, the upland, the fen edge and the fen. The parish was laid out in an elongated form so as to provide access to each of these. At the highest edge, in the west, the geology is chalky till (boulder clay) but most of the upland is Jurassic, including a little Oxford Clay but mostly Kellaways Sand and some Cornbrash and Kellaways Clay. The fen edge consists of First Terrace Gravel with a little Glacial Gravel. The landward part of the fen was black soil, composed largely of peat. Over the two and half centuries since the land was drained, this has largely oxidized away leaving the underlying First Terrace gravel and the mainly clays of the Barroway Drove Beds. These beds form the central part of the fen as well, as they do at the eastern end of the parish. However, there, there is a broad ridge of the Terrington Beds, the remains of a huge marine creek which was not laid down until the Bronze Age and was still active when the Romans diverted Bourne Eau into it by means of what is called by archaeologists 'the Bourne-Morton Canal'. Our medieval ancestors knew it as the Old Ea.

== Religious sites ==
Morton's Grade I listed Anglican parish church is dedicated to St John the Baptist. The church is built in the Early English and Perpendicular styles, and was restored in 1860 and 1951. The ecclesiastical parish is Morton (Bourne), part of the Ringstone in Aveland group of the Deanery of Beltisloe, Diocese of Lincoln.

A Baptist chapel was built in 1875, and still serves the village today.
