= Careby =

Village in Lincolnshire, England

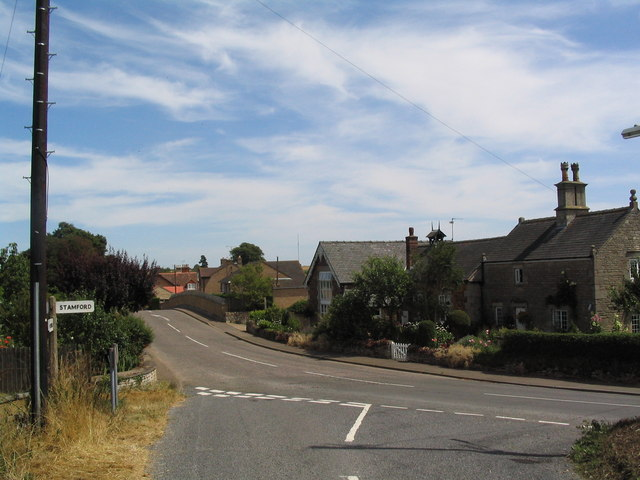
- Road bridge over the East Coast Main Line, Careby

- Location within Lincolnshire
- OS grid reference: TF021164
  - London: 85 mi (137 km) S
- Civil parish: Careby Aunby and Holywell
- District: South Kesteven
- Shire county: Lincolnshire
- Region: East Midlands
- Country: England
- Sovereign state: United Kingdom
- Post town: Stamford
- Postcode district: PE9
- Police: Lincolnshire
- Fire: Lincolnshire
- Ambulance: East Midlands
- UK Parliament: Grantham and Stamford

Careby is the principal village in the civil parish of Careby Aunby and Holywell, in the South Kesteven district of Lincolnshire, England. The River West Glen flows through the parish, near Careby, forming part of the parish boundary. In 1921 the parish had a population of 116. On 1 April 1931 the parish was abolished to form "Careby, Aunby and Holywell".

== Village ==
The name derives from the Old Scandinavian 'Kariby' or "village of a man named Kari," and first appears in 1199 as Careby. The placename suffix, "by", is common in this part of the country, being part of the Danelaw.

Although very small, Careby is the largest settlement in the parish. An old manor house, successor to the rather grander home of the Hatcher family who once owned the parish, is down a small lane leading away from the railway, which also includes the 19th century rectory, now in private hands.

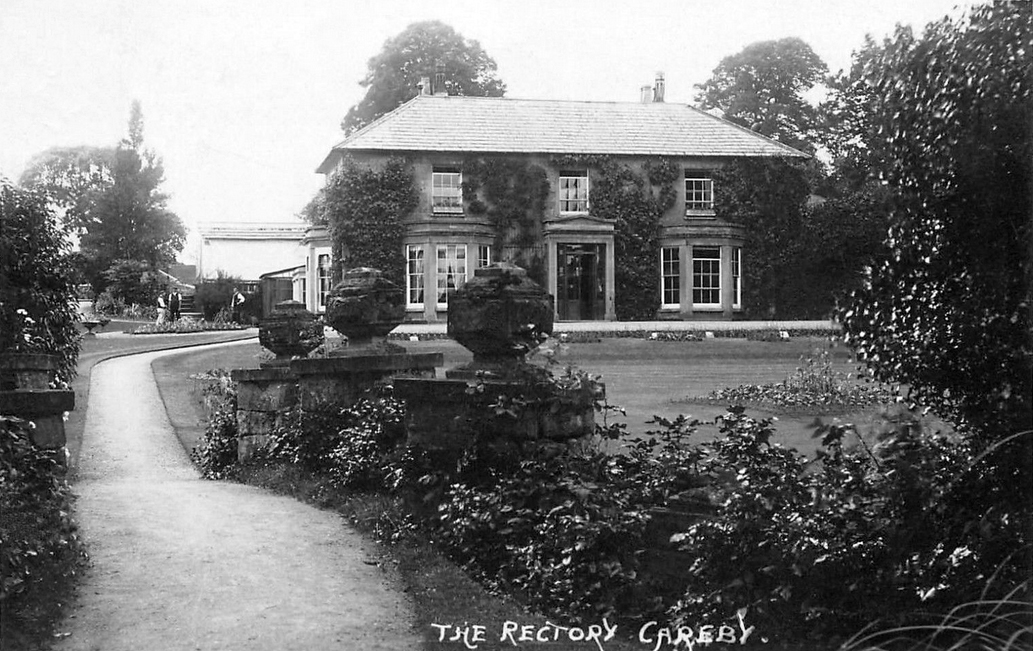
Careby Rectory, before 1912

Careby Grade I listed Anglican church is dedicated to St Stephen. It is late Norman with later Perpendicular additions. A sanctuary knocker hangs on the door and a 15th-century altar is preserved inside.

Careby Rectory, now a private house, was built in 1827 and was Grade II listed by English Heritage in 1986.

The East Coast Main Line passes through the east of the parish, through Careby. This is part of the section from Stoke Summit where Mallard broke the speed record for Steam locomotives.

The village school was opened in 1869, and closed before 1970. The building, to the west of the railway line, is now a private home.

During the Second World War the village played host to children from Sheffield who attended a working farm camp to help with the harvest. They were accommodated in the village hall.

=== Careby Camp ===
52°43′41″N 0°27′40″W
In Careby Wood is an Iron Age fort known as Careby Camp.
