= Ellys Manor House =

Manor house in Great Ponton, Lincolnshire, England

Coordinates: 52.8636°N 0.627°W

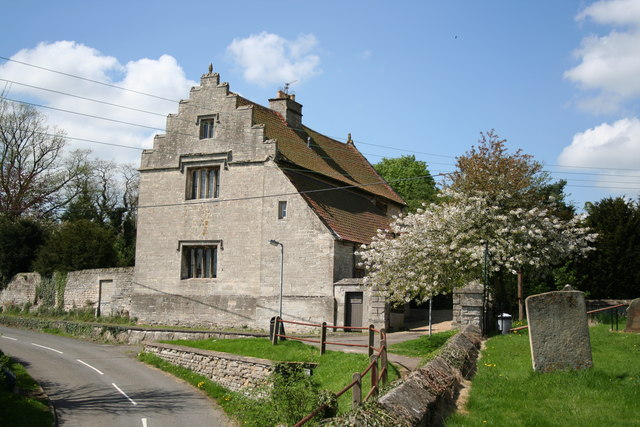
The house in 2006

Ellys Manor House (pronounced "Ellis"), or the Old Rectory is a late-fifteenth to early sixteenth-century manor house in Great Ponton, Lincolnshire, England. It was built by Anthony Ellys (or Ellis), a wool merchant, and member of the Staple of Calais, who also built the tower of the village church. The house was restored as a Rectory (it had previously been divided up as two cottages), by the Grantham architect Wilfred Bond. The house is now privately owned, but the house and garden are open to the public at certain times; it is a member of the Historic Houses Association.

== Architectural description ==
David Roberts suggests that the house incorporates fragments of an elaborate hall house of the late Middle Ages. This had been the parlour cross wing of a larger house. In his plan of the building, he shows that it was overlaid, rebuilt and virtually demolished in the course of the 16th-century rebuilding. The present fragment consists of two parlours, over which are a painted great chamber and garrets, with fragments of an open hall. On the street side there is a high gable end, crow stepped, with triangular finials. On the north side there is a circular staircase corbelled out on a bracket. The main staircase was inserted in the 17th century. The roof is of arch-braced queen post construction. The house is noted for the wall paintings in the upper rooms, which Nikolaus Pevsner describes as a rare English interpretation of a French verdure tapestry. Painted columns form panels in which stylised trees spread large, lush leaves. In some of the spaces between there are peacocks and deer.

The house, with its wall and gate piers, is grade II* listed.

== Literature ==
Antram N (revised), Pevsner N & Harris J, (1989), The Buildings of England: Lincolnshire, Yale University Press. Roberts D L (ed. Shaun Tyas), (2018), Lincolnshire Houses, Tyas, Donnington. ISBN 9781900289719.
