= South Kesteven Rural District =

Former local government area in the UK

Coordinates: 52.78°N 0.45°W

South Kesteven was a rural district in Lincolnshire, Parts of Kesteven in England from 1931 to 1974.

It was formed under a County Review Order in 1931, by the merger of the Bourne Rural District and the Uffington Rural District.

It continued in existence until 1974, when it was abolished by the Local Government Act 1972, going on to form part of a larger South Kesteven non-metropolitan district.
