= Holywell, Lincolnshire =

Settlement in Lincolnshire, England

Coordinates: 52.732285°N 0.51531°W

Holywell
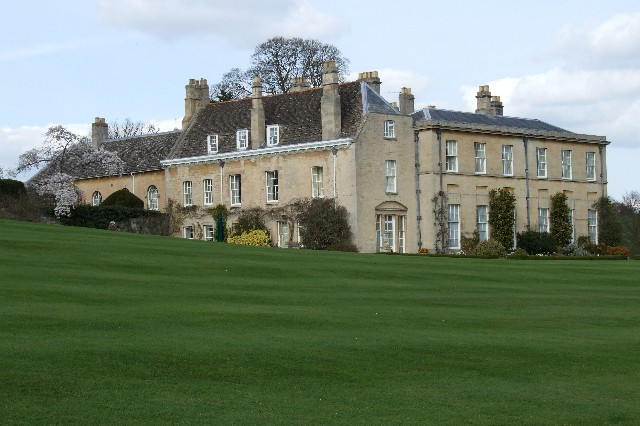
- Holywell Hall

- Location within Lincolnshire
- OS grid reference: TF 00350 15994
  - London: 85 mi (137 km) S
- Civil parish: Careby Aunby and Holywell
- District: South Kesteven
- Shire county: Lincolnshire
- Region: East Midlands
- Country: England
- Sovereign state: United Kingdom
- Post town: Stamford
- Postcode district: PE9
- Police: Lincolnshire
- Fire: Lincolnshire
- Ambulance: East Midlands
- UK Parliament: Grantham and Stamford

Holywell is a tiny settlement in the civil parish of Careby Aunby and Holywell, in the South Kesteven district of Lincolnshire, England. It lies 5.5 miles (9 km) north from Stamford and 6 miles (10 km) south-west from Bourne. It is a collection of houses around a country house and park. The park includes a small private church dedicated to St Wilfrid. Ornamental lakes have been restored over the last 20 years, and new gardens laid out. In 2009 the gardens were open to the public through the National Garden Scheme.

Two venerated springs are reported in the village, Holy Well and St Winifred's. Only the location of the first is known. There are no other place names associated with venerated springs in Lincolnshire, although other Holy Wells exist such as those near the site of Sempringham Priory and nearby Ryhall.

== History ==
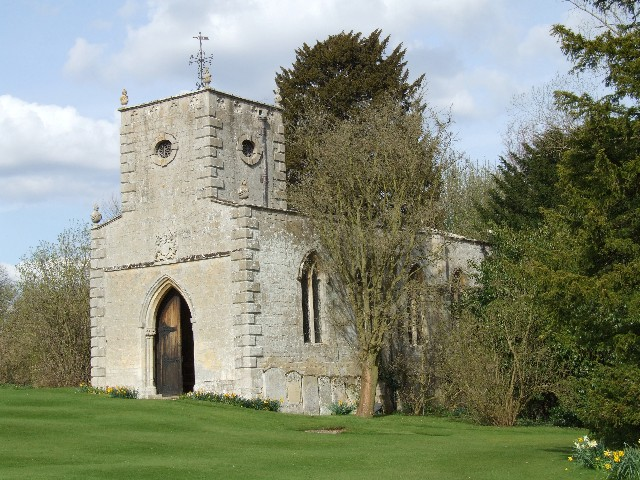
St Wilfrid's church, Holywell Hall

The 1885 Kelly's Directory notes that Holywell with Aunby consists of 2,300 acres (9.3 km^{2}) with chief agricultural of barley and wheat, and an 1881 population of 63, and that "a medicinal spring rises here from where the place takes its name". Holywell Hall, a mansion in "well-wooded park", was then the seat of Charles Thomas Samuel Birch-Reynardson DL, lord of the manor, and sole landowner. The chapel in the park, a small stone building in Early English style, was reconstructed in reign of Queen Anne. It comprises a chancel, nave, south aisle and two-bell tower. A restoration of 1863-64 included the replacement of a previous flat roof with one of open timber, with the church interior re-fitted in oak, "effected under the superintendence of rector Rev J B Reynardson".

In 1916 Cox stated that Holywell is a chapelry of Careby parish. The church in Holywell Hall grounds was moved in 1699 from a site east of the Castle Bytham road 'between the bridge and the mill' where it had been subject to frequent flooding. It incorporates material from the destroyed church of Aunby, including two Norman piers that support the tower, a Decorated doorway and a window glazed with Perpendicular style glass. Pevsner adds that St Wilfrid's church stands south of Holywell Hall as one of its garden ornaments, has an east window with a mosaic of small fragments from the 15th to 19th centuries, and a paten and chalice dated 1662. St Wilfrid's is Grade II* listed.

In 1921 the parish had a population of 67. On 1 April 1931 the parish was abolished to form "Careby, Aunby and Holywell".

== Holywell Hall ==
Holywell Hall is a Grade II* listed 17th-century country house, built on the site of an older medieval manor house. It was built in three phases. Beginning as an L-shaped house, it was extended in either 1732 or 1764, and again in the early 19th century. The west front of the house is possibly from 1764, and the south and east fronts from the 19th century.

In 1728, it was bought from the Goodhall family by Lady Mary Barnadiston, née Reynardson, for her nephew Samuel Reynardson. Reynardson may have laid out the gardens, and built the temples in Palladian style in 1732, the time of his marriage.

South-west of the house, against a lake, is a Grade II* listed fishing temple with pedimented Roman Doric portico and rusticated windows. It is identical to the menagerie designed by James Gibbs at Hackwood and published in his 1728 "Book of Architecture".

Facing the hall's drive are listed Palladian stables with an octagonal domed lantern.

Further listed buildings are a 17th-century dovecote, an orangery to the west of the hall, and a three-arched balustraded bridge on the road between two easterly lakes.

In 1954 the Hon. Mrs Mountjoy Fane (Agatha Isabel Acland-Hood-Reynardson) sold the hall with 69 acres to Philip Lockwood who owned Lockwood Foods Ltd. Mrs Fane retained ownership of several hundred acres of farm land.

In 1977 Philip Lockwood emigrated to France and the Hall was then occupied by his son, William Lockwood.

In 1984 the hall was sold to Keith Childs who had a shoe import business, Holywell Footwear Ltd, based at the Hall.

In 1994 the hall and 830-acre estate was sold to Princess Yuri Galitzine (Dr. Jean Shanks) for £4m.

In 2003 it was sold to Robert Gillespie for £7m.

In October 2013 the hall with approximately 76 acres was sold for £4.7m to a company based in the British Virgin Islands, Slipstream Overseas SA. The farmland of 863 acres was sold separately for approx. £6.25m.

Holywell

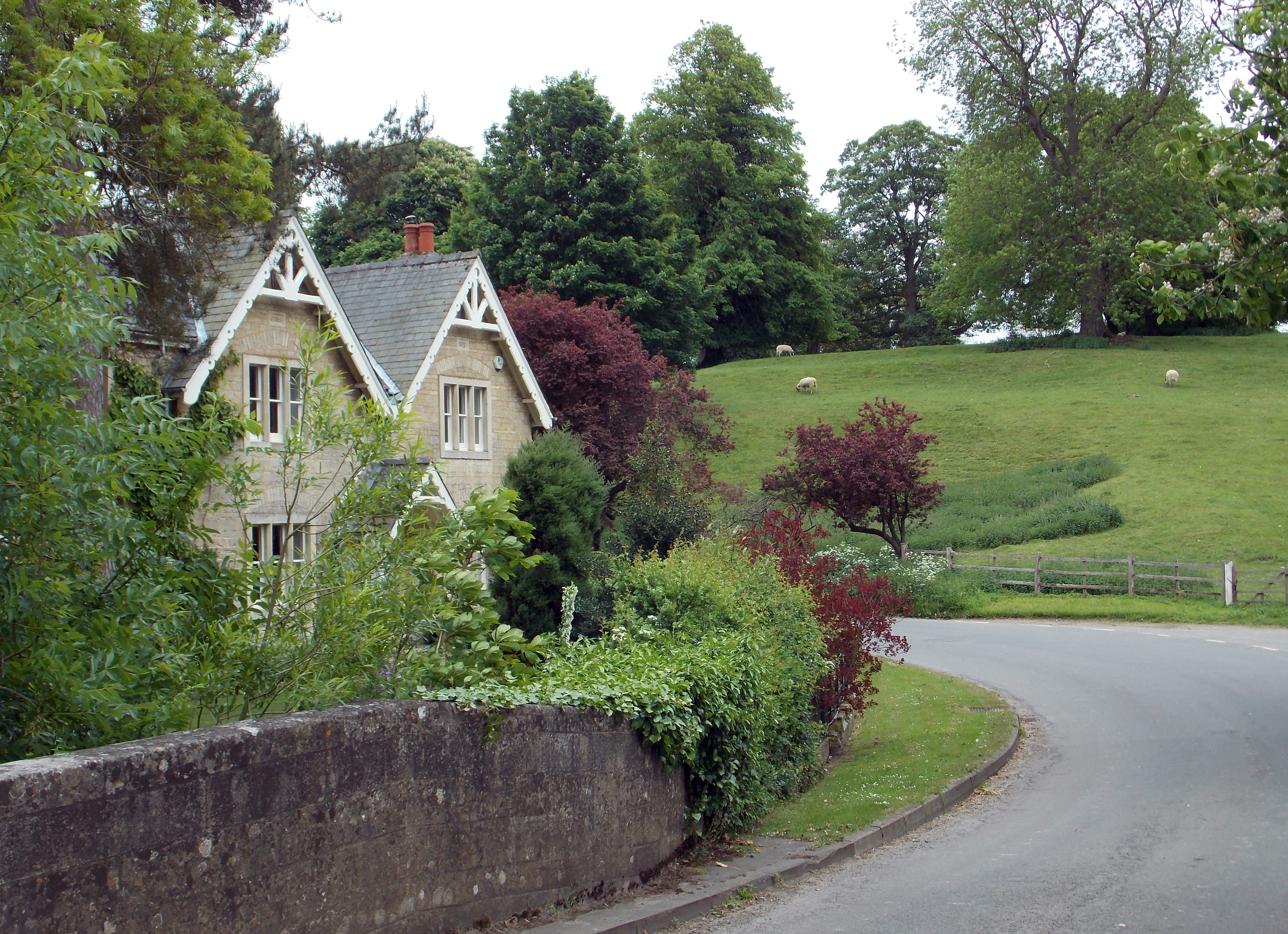
Road through Holywell

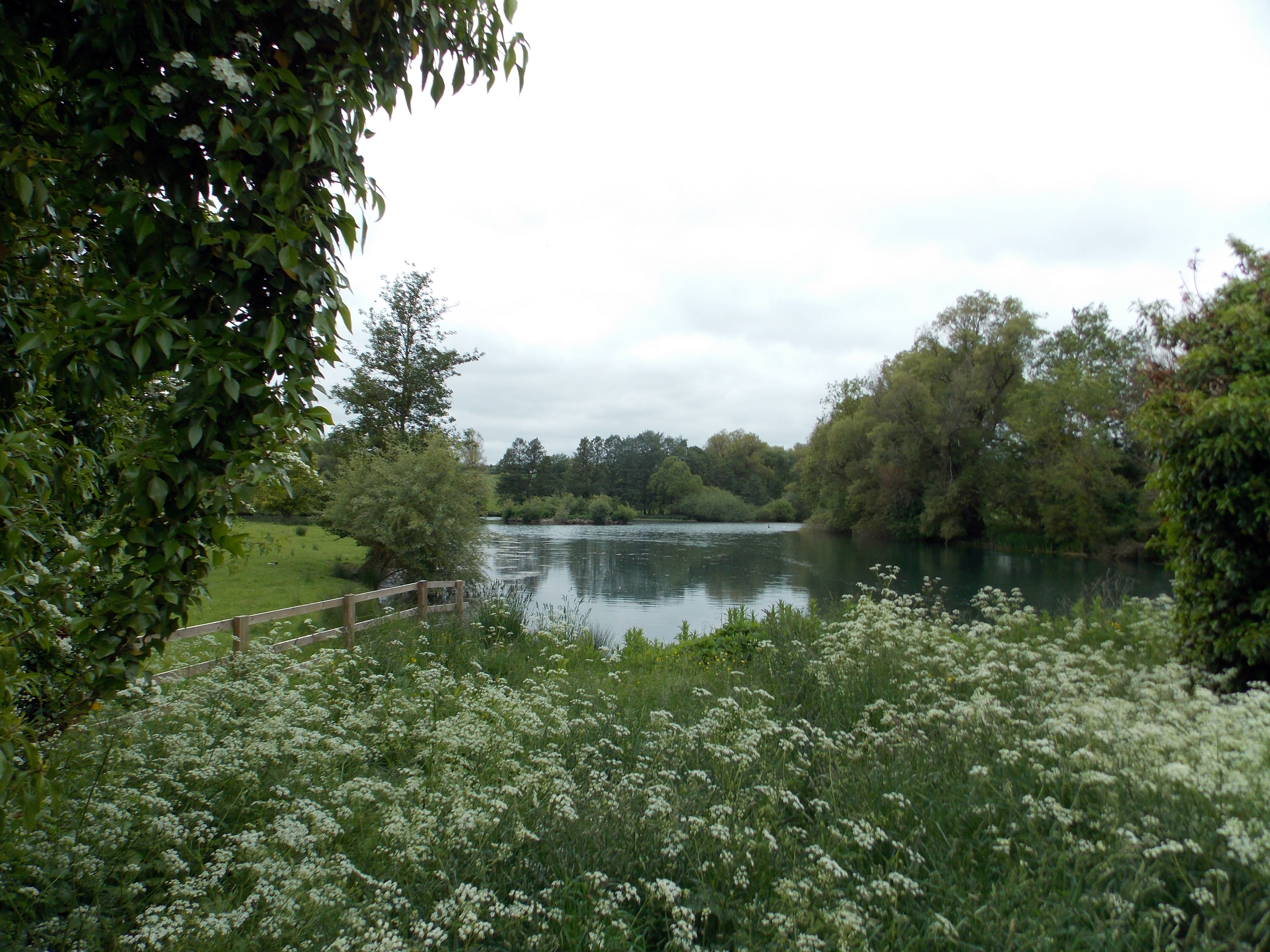
Lake at Holywell

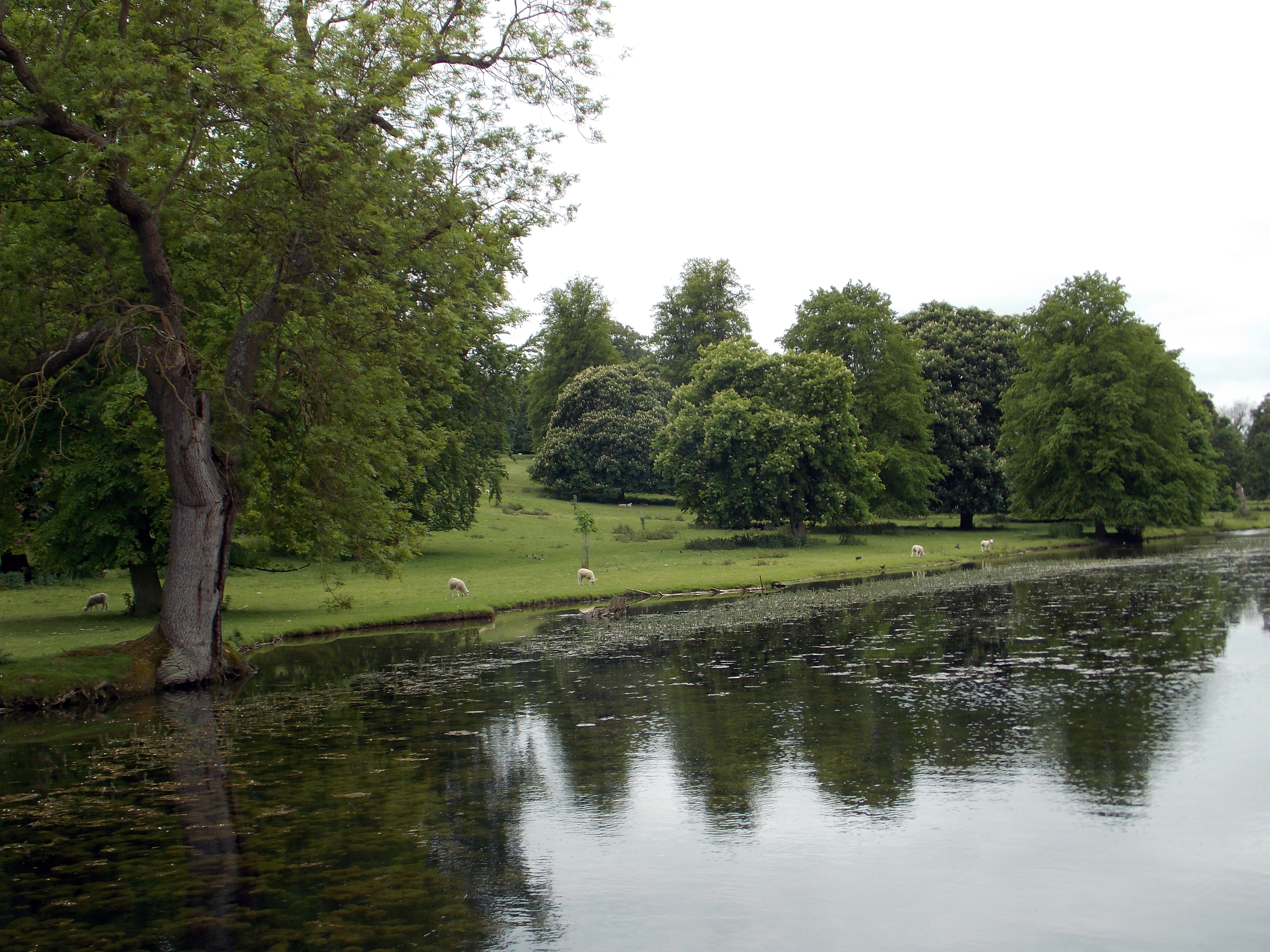
Lake at Holywell

== Conservation areas ==
At the western boundary with Rutland, at Lincolnshire Gate, lies the small nature reserve of Robert's Field.

Farmland at Holywell Banks (SK 995157) has been designated a Site of Special Scientific Interest.

== Other holy wells nearby ==
- Ryhall
- Greetham, Rutland
- Skillington: Fish well
- Oakham: Our Lady's well
