= Dowsby =

Village and civil parish in the South Kesteven district of Lincolnshire, England

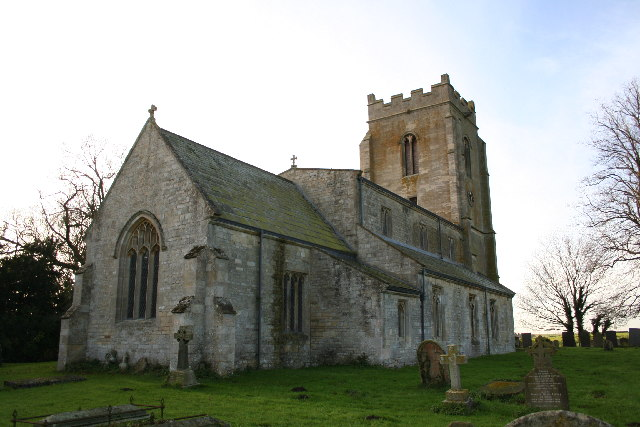
- Church of St Andrew, Dowsby

- Location within Lincolnshire
- Population: 204 (2011)
- OS grid reference: TF113294
  - London: 90 mi (140 km) S
- District: South Kesteven
- Shire county: Lincolnshire
- Region: East Midlands
- Country: England
- Sovereign state: United Kingdom
- Post town: Bourne
- Postcode district: PE10
- Police: Lincolnshire
- Fire: Lincolnshire
- Ambulance: East Midlands
- UK Parliament: Grantham and Bourne

Dowsby is a village and civil parish in the South Kesteven district of Lincolnshire, England. It is situated on the western edge of The Fens at the junction of the east–west B1397 road and the north–south B1177. It is 1 mile (1.6 km) north-east from Rippingale and just south of Pointon. The civil parish includes the hamlet of Graby. Nearby to the east, along the B1397 at Dowsby Fen, is Car Dyke. The civil parish population taken at the 2011 census was 204.

== History ==
The name Dowsby is from the Old Scandinavian 'Dusi+by', for "farmstead of Dusi", appearing in the Domesday Book as "Dusebi".

Hoe Hills (52°51′32″N 0°20′37″W) was a group of round barrows dating back to the Bronze Age where Roman and Medieval finds have been made.

St Andrew's Church, originating from the 12th century, was mostly rebuilt and enlarged in 1864, although Norman fragments remain as part of the fabric. A recumbent effigy of Etheldreda Rigdon, and six brasses to the Burrell family from 1682 lie in the vestry. Built into the outer wall of the south aisle are parts of a Saxon cross.

On the edge of the fen was a decoy used to trap ducks commercially in the 19th century. These would almost certainly have been shipped for sale by railway, probably from Rippingale railway station which was approximately a mile from the decoy.

== Dowsby ==
Dowsby Grade II* listed Anglican parish church is dedicated to St Andrew. The ecclesiastical parish is part of the Billingborough Group of the Lafford Deanery, Diocese of Lincoln. The 2013 incumbent is the Rev. Anna Sorensen.

Dowsby Fen falls within the drainage area of the Black Sluice Internal Drainage Board.

Most employment in the parish is agricultural. The former rectory is now a care home for the elderly, providing some employment. The nearest shops are in Billingborough, 3 miles (5 km) to the north, the nearest public house in Aslackby, 2 miles (3 km) to the west.The bus service 401 operates to Bourne on Thursdays, provided by Delaine buses.

== Graby ==
52°51′13″N 0°21′59″W
The hamlet of Graby is situated 1 mile to the west of Dowsby, and on the line of Mareham Lane Roman Road. Graby incorporates the site of a deserted medieval village, with cropmark and earthwork evidence of sunken lanes, crofts, ponds and ridge and furrow field systems.

== Further research ==
- Lane, Tom "Hoe Hills, Dowsby", Fenland Research, vol. 9 (1994), pp. 16–19.
