= Rippingale =

Village and civil parish in the South Kesteven district of Lincolnshire, England

Coordinates: 52.836949°N 0.370894°W

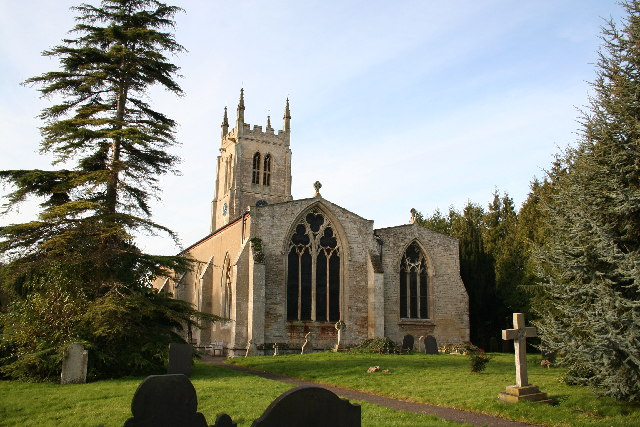
- St Andrew's Church, Rippingale

- Location within Lincolnshire
- Population: 929 (2011)
- OS grid reference: TF098278
  - London: 90 mi (140 km) S
- District: South Kesteven
- Shire county: Lincolnshire
- Region: East Midlands
- Country: England
- Sovereign state: United Kingdom
- Post town: Bourne
- Postcode district: PE10
- Police: Lincolnshire
- Fire: Lincolnshire
- Ambulance: East Midlands
- UK Parliament: Grantham and Bourne

Rippingale is a village and civil parish in the South Kesteven district of Lincolnshire, England. The population of the civil parish was 929 at the 2011 census. The village is situated on the A15 road, about 5 miles (8 km) north from Bourne.

Rippingale is part of the Ringstone in Aveland group of the Deanery of Beltisloe, Diocese of Lincoln. The vicar was the Revd Dr Lynda Pugh between 2012 and 2018. The incumbent is the Revd Neil Bullen. St Andrew's Church dates from the fourteenth century, though the tower is later.

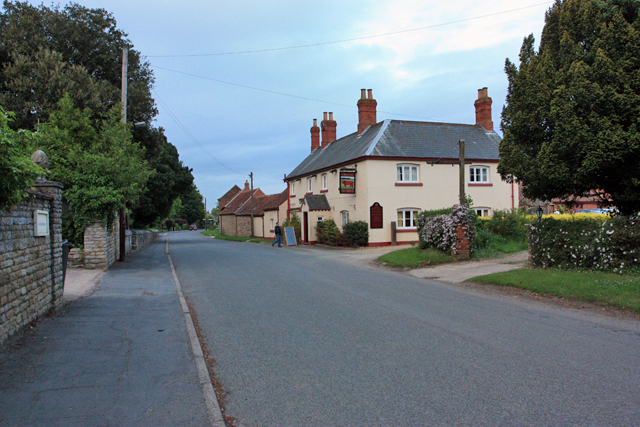
The Bull public house, Rippingale

The village public house is The Bull Inn. A railway station on a line between Bourne and Sleaford opened in 1871 for goods and closed in 1964; regular passenger services lasted from 1872 to 1930.

Rippingale falls within the drainage area of the Black Sluice Internal Drainage Board. Within the parish is found the Rippingale Running Dyke which joins to the Car Dyke and these then drain into the South Forty-Foot Drain.

South of the village is the site of Ringstone, a lost village, which dates from before the Norman Conquest and which survived into the 19th century as Ringstone Hall.TF094270

Parish boundary within Lincolnshire

Rippingale has a village design statement produced by a Village Design Statement Committee. The committee was established by parish councillor Marcus Petz to produce guidance for South Kesteven District Council (SKDC). The statement was adopted in 2002.

== Notable structures ==
One street is called Station Street, but was originally called Water Lane. It has the oldest extant structures of the village on it. This includes a 13th-century pinfold.

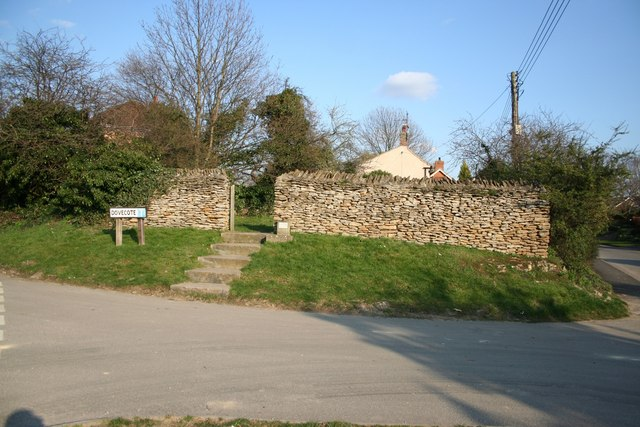
The Pinfold, Rippingale
