= Careby Aunby and Holywell =

- Civil parish
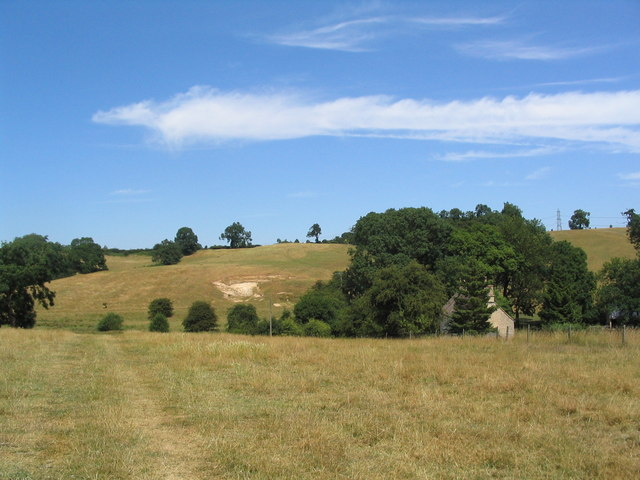
- Hollow cottages, typical terrain for the parish

- Careby Aunby and Holywell in Lincolnshire
- Coordinates: 52.730°N 0.494°W
- Country: England
- Primary council: South Kesteven
- County: Lincolnshire
- Region: East Midlands
- Status: Parish

Government
  - Type: Parish Council
  - UK Parliament: Grantham and Stamford

Population (2011 census)
  - Total: 143
- Website: Careby Aunby and Holywell Parish Council

Careby Aunby and Holywell is a civil parish in the district of South Kesteven, south-west Lincolnshire, in England. It stretches from the county border with Rutland in the west to the River West Glen in the east. The B1176 road from Corby Glen passes through Careby and on past Aunby toward Stamford. The main London to Scotland railway line passes through the parish, the line upon which Mallard took the speed record for the LNER.

The total population in the 2001 census was 146, falling marginally to 143 at the 2011 census. The population in 1801 was 65, and had risen to 133 by 1911

The centre of the parish is near grid reference TF017157

== Places in the parish ==
=== Settlements ===
- Careby 52°44′11″N 0°29′08″W
- Aunby 52°43′09″N 0°29′18″W
- Holywell 52°43′57″N 0°30′38″W

=== Other Locations ===
- Castle Dyke 52°43′08″N 0°30′07″W

Earthen banks forming the remains of a small moated medieval structure in the woods between Aunby and Holywell.

- Lincolnshire Gate 52°43′15″N 0°31′17″W

At the western boundary with Rutland there is a small but important Nature Reserve called Robert's Field at Lincolnshire Gate.

- Stanton's Pit 52°44′32″N 0°28′11″W

At the Eastern side on the lane to Witham on the Hill is a small but important Nature Reserve called Stanton's pit, a former sandpit now important to bird life.

- Holywell Banks 52°43′49″N 0°31′38″W

Grassland designated an SSSI.

- Careby Camp 52°43′41″N 0°27′41″W

An Iron-Age hill fort in modern woodland.

== Geology ==
The parish's geology is a complex mixture of numerous strata of Jurassic rocks with the highest ground formed of glacial drift. The northernmost part lies on the gravels and sands which filled the valley of a Cromerian Stage river. To the east and west of Careby are patches of chalky glacial till, the eastern one overlying a thin remnant of Kellways beds with cornbrash fairly extensively exposed to its south. There are exposures of Blisworth clay, Blisworth Limestone, Upper Estuarine Series, and Upper Lincolnshire Limestone. Holywell’s quarries supplied stone for various building projects including Windsor Castle.

== Administration ==
The ecclesiastical parish includes Careby Aunby and Holywell and is part of the Castle Bytham with Creeton group of parishes under the Beltisloe Deanery, Diocese of Lincoln. The shared parish priest is The Revd Sue Evans.

Once part of the Beltisloe Wapentake in Kesteven, the parish is now part of South Kesteven District. Its obligations under the 19th century poor law were undertaken by the Bourne Poor Law Union from 1835 onwards.

The present Electoral arrangements are as follows:

- South Kesteven District Council, Hillsides ward – Councillor Elizabeth Channell
- Lincolnshire County Council, Stamford Rural ward – Councillor Thomas Trollope-Bellew
- Westminster, Stamford and Grantham constituency – Nicholas Boles MP
- European Parliament, East Midlands – Derek Clark Roger Helmer Glenis Willmott Emma McClarkin Bill Newton Dunn

In lieu of a parish council, local democracy takes the form of a Parish Meeting.

== Economy and amenities ==
Most of the businesses in the parish are farms.

- Stanton's Pit is a former gravel pit operated as a wetland Nature Reserve by the Lincolnshire Wildlife Trust.

== See also ==
- Little Bytham
- Pickworth, Rutland
- Ryhall, for other holy wells
