= Greatford =

Village and civil parish in Lincolnshire, England

Coordinates: 52.6937°N 0.3928°W

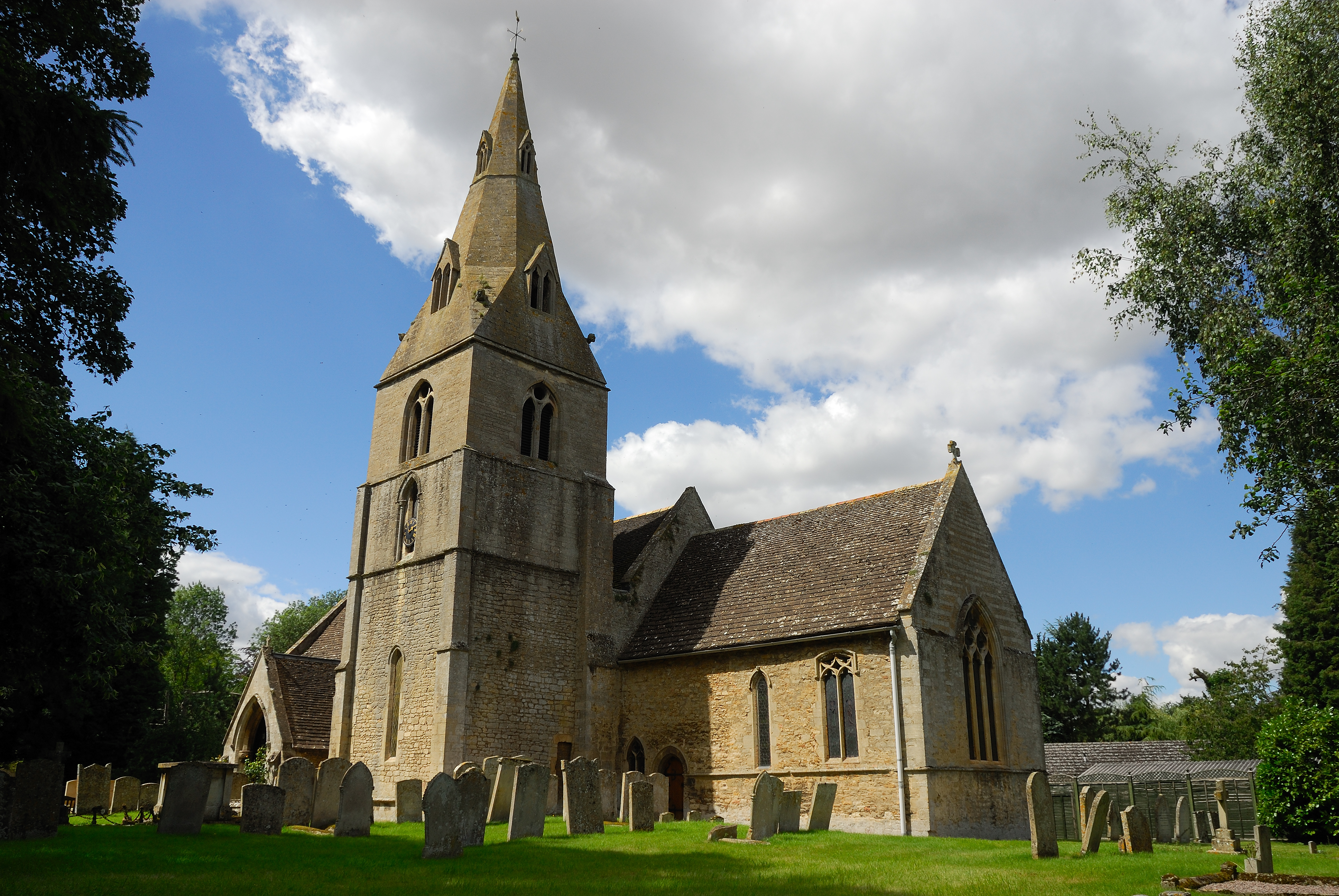
- Church of St Thomas Becket, Greatford

- Location within Lincolnshire
- Population: 268 (2011)
- OS grid reference: TF089117
  - London: 80 mi (130 km) S
- Civil parish: Greatford
- District: South Kesteven
- Shire county: Lincolnshire
- Region: East Midlands
- Country: England
- Sovereign state: United Kingdom
- Post town: STAMFORD
- Postcode district: PE9
- Dialling code: 01778
- Police: Lincolnshire
- Fire: Lincolnshire
- Ambulance: East Midlands
- UK Parliament: Grantham and Stamford

Greatford is a village and civil parish in the South Kesteven district of Lincolnshire, England. It is situated 2 miles (3 km) west from the A15, 4.5 miles (7 km) north-east from Stamford, and 5 miles (8 km) south from Bourne. Greatford is noted for Greatford Hall, once the home of the priest and physician Francis Willis.

In the 2001 Census, Greatford's population was found to be 260, increasing slightly to 268 at the 2011 census.

== History ==
There are different pronunciations and spellings for this village's name, including Greatford, Gritford, and Gretford. The name could be derived from its location on a gravel or 'grit' ford of the West Glen River.

Greatford is listed in the Domesday Book of 1086 as "Greteford" and "Griteford".

The parish contains the now untraceable medieval hamlet of Banthorp, also mentioned in the Domesday Book. A 1334 tax list puts the site of Banthorp to the west of Greatford at Banthorpe Woods and Lodge.

In October 1892 a granary full of barley collapsed at the farm of the Dean family, killing four people: two from Greatford, one from Langtoft and one from Market Deeping.

== Landmarks ==
Greatford Grade I listed church, built in Early English style, dedicated to St Thomas of Canterbury. It is part of the Uffington Group of the Deanery of Aveland & Ness with Stamford. The incumbent is the Rev'd Carolyn Kennedy. The church was previously part of the Greatford with Wilsthorpe Group.

Greatford Hall was originally a manor house built during the reign of Queen Elizabeth I in the 16th century. It was the home and private asylum for Francis Willis, the physician who treated and 'cured' King George III of his 'madness' here in 1788. In 1922 the hall burned down and was subsequently rebuilt in a similar style to the original. There is no public access to the hall today.

During the Second World War the Hall was owned by Lancaster Gate Hotels. In the 20th century Greatford Hall was the residence of the businessman Harry Dowsett who, in 1943, formed the civil engineering company Dow-Mac that first developed the use of prestressed concrete, made at Tallington 2 miles (3.2 km) to the south of Greatford. The company is now Tarmac Precast Concrete. In 1940 Dowsett bought the Lowestoft-based firm of shipbuilders, Brooke Marine that made Royal Navy landing craft during the Second World War.

The village public house is the Hare and Hounds on Village Street. Serving Landlords compiled by Mrs 'Sunny' Mason, resident of Greatford for 80 years:

Landlords unknown prior to 1890. 1890 – 1900 Mr & Mrs Starkie, 1903 – 1928 Mr & Mrs Barnes, 1940 – 1944 Reg & Martha Simpkins, 1945 – 1951 Tom & Sylvia Bills, 1952 – 1962 Earnie & Doris Groves, 1962 – 1968 Jock & Jean Brown, 1968 – 1971 Keith & Sylvia ( Surname unknown)Button?, 1971 – 1975 Ted & Joan Pass, 1975 – 1978 Malcolm & Jane Mills, 1978 – 1979 Kay & Tim (Surname unknown), 1979 – 1980 Dave Medcalf, 1980 – 1981 Alf Button, 1981 – 1984 Peter & Valerie Wilkins, 1984 – 1985 Nigel & Melinda Dawkins, 1985 – 1986 Mr & Mrs Simpson (Brewery Managers), 1986 – 1987 Ricky & Olga Podmore, 1987 – 1989 John & Pat Vasey, 1989 – 1990 Michael Thurlby, 1990 – 1993 Nigel & Melinda Dawkins, 1999 – 2006 Nick & Bridie Hards, 2006 – 2010 Gemma Dixie, 2011 – to date Steven Rigby & Alexandra Faux.

== Geography ==
To the west, the parish boundary meets Braceborough and Wilsthorpe to the north, passing through Banthorpe Lodge, crossing the East Coast Main Line, then following the West Glen River through Shillingthorpe Park. Close to the village near Greatford Hall, the boundary passes north, crossing the road to Carlby. It follows part of the Macmillan Way (which passes straight through the parish, broadly following the Glen) near some coppices. It rejoins the West Glen River, crossing the road to Wilsthorpe. East of Fletland Mill, it meets Thurlby (Obthorpe).

At the A15 bridge over the West Glen River, where the Macmillan Way crosses, it meets Baston, to the east. The boundary now follows the Roman road King Street, and the King Street Drain, to the south. For 200 metres it meets Langtoft, then meets Barholm and Stowe, and leaves King Street to the west, passing through some coppices. north of Barholm, it briefly follows the Greatford Cut, a navigation built in 1954 to connect the West Glen River, to the north at Greatford, with the River Welland west of Market Deeping, and to stop the River Glen from flooding. It passes north of Maidens' Farm and at the East Coast Main Line meets Uffington, passing along the southern edge of Browne's Oaks.

The highest part of the parish is just above the 20m contour in the North west. The village and the remaining farmland is rather lower, perhaps less than 15m. (there is a 12m spot height for the village itself on the OS map)

The underlying geology of the parish is Sedimentary: to the South and East is of a Kellaways sand and siltstone.mix, and to the North and West a Kellaways clay deposit where the land rises at the western edge of the Parish. The whole is overlaid with Quaternary 'river terrace' sands and gravels dating back 1 or 2 million years. Unlike Tallington to the south, there has been no extraction of these deposits in Greatford. From the south west to the Northwest the west Glen river lies in a shallow valley, its floodplain formed of its own alluvium of clay and silt.

== Community ==
The ecclesiastical parish is part of the Uffington Group of the Deanery of Stamford. The 2014 incumbent is Rev'd Carolyn Kennedy.

The village has won 'Best Kept Small Village' awards in the first decade of the century

There is a village hall.

The Demand responsive Bus service 15B is available to Bourne or Deeping, but must be booked in advance.

A mobile library visits monthly.

== Local Government ==
Greatford is served by a Parish Council, two District Councillors who represent Casewick Ward on South Kesteven District Council and a County Councillor representing Deepings West & Rural Division on Lincolnshire County Council. The current District Councillors elected in 2015 are Kelham Cooke (Con) and Rosemary Trollope-Bellew (Con). The Lincolnshire County Councillor elected in 2017 is Rosemary Trollope-Bellew (Con).

== Gallery ==
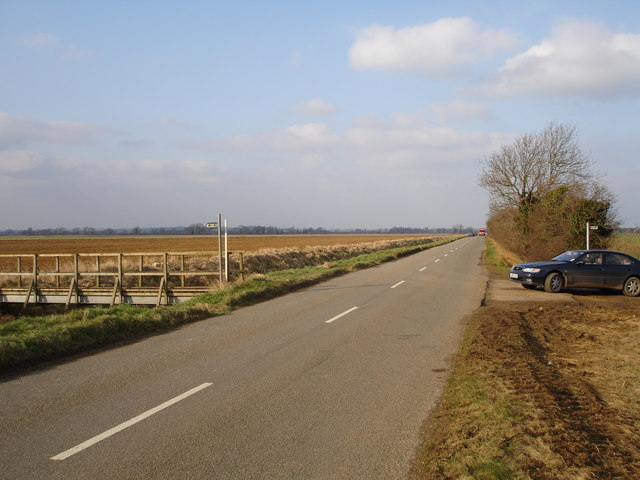
King Street near Langtoft

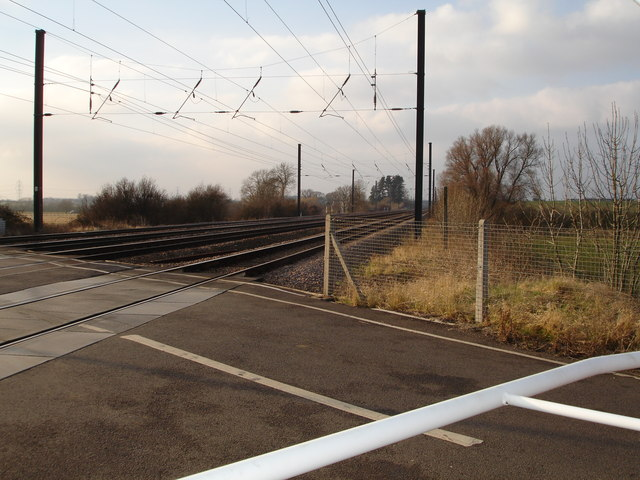
East Coast Main Line on the Greatford to Belmesthorpe road

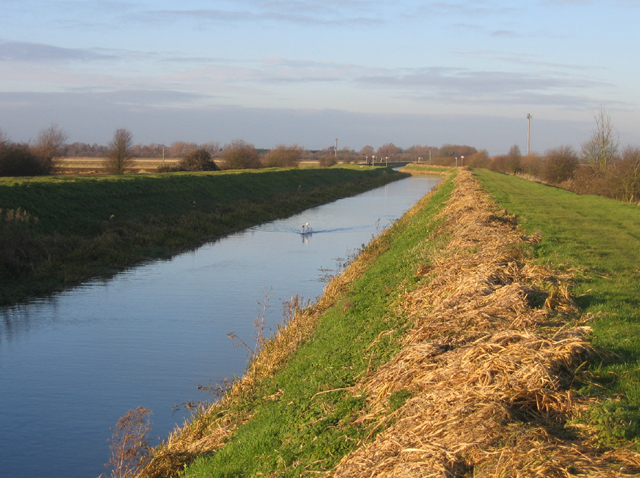
Greatford Cut

== See also ==
- HMS Greatford (P3109), a 1950s Ford class seaward defence boat, built for initial training for University Royal Naval Unit. It was 108 feet (33 m) long, and was around 120 tonnes with one 40 mm and two 20 mm anti-aircraft guns.
