= Wilsthorpe Crossing Halt railway station =

Former railway station in Lincolnshire, England

Wilsthorpe Crossing Halt

General information
- Location: Wilsthorpe, South Kesteven; England
- Coordinates: 52.7214°N 0.3972°W
- Grid reference: TF083149
- Platforms: 1

Other information
- Status: Disused

History
- Original company: London and North Eastern Railway
- Post-grouping: London and North Eastern Railway

Key dates
- September 1925: Station opened
- 18 June 1951: Station closed
Location

Wilsthorpe Crossing Halt railway station was on the branch line between Bourne and Essendine, Lincolnshire, England.

== History ==
The line of the Bourn and Essendine Railway (B&ER) opened on 16 June 1860, with intermediate stations at Thurlby and Braceborough Spa. The B&ER was operated by the Great Northern Railway (GNR), which absorbed it on 25 July 1864.

Wilsthorpe had a small sidings, used for the delivery of coals to a local pumping station before the halt was opened.

In September 1925, the London and North Eastern Railway (LNER), which had been created on 1 January 1923 by the amalgamation of the GNR with several other railways, opened a station between Thurlby and Braceborough Spa, naming it Wilsthorpe Crossing Halt; it was adjacent to a level crossing on the road connecting Wilsthorpe with Manthorpe.

The station closed with the line on 18 June 1951.

Preceding station	Disused railways	Following station
Braceborough Spa Halt	London and North Eastern Railway Bourn and Essendine Railway	Thurlby
