= Thurlby =

Thurlby may refer to three places in Lincolnshire, England:

- Thurlby, South Kesteven, a village and civil parish, also known as Thurlby by Bourne
  - Thurlby railway station, a former railway station in the parish
- Thurlby, North Kesteven, a village and civil parish
- Thurlby, East Lindsey, a hamlet in Bilsby parish

== See also ==
- Thirlby, a village and civil parish in Hambleton, North Yorkshire, England
- Thirlby (surname)
