= Aswarby and Scredington railway station =

Former railway station in Lincolnshire, England

Coordinates: 52°57′17.3″N 0°22′50.5″W

Aswarby and Scredington
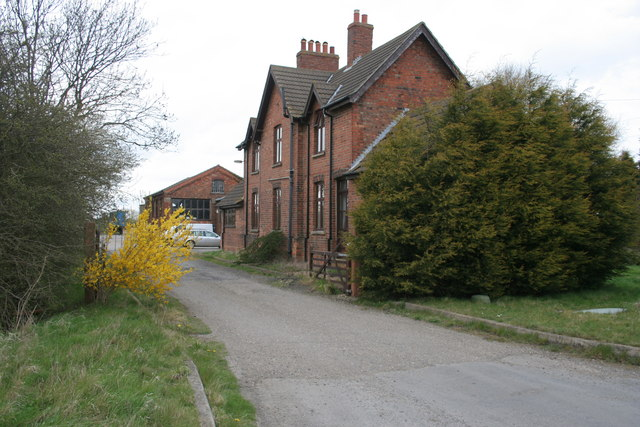
- Station buildings are now a private home

General information
- Location: Scredington, North Kesteven; England
- Grid reference: TF089407

Other information
- Status: Disused

History
- Original company: Great Northern Railway
- Pre-grouping: Great Northern Railway
- Post-grouping: London and North Eastern Railway

Key dates
- 2 January 1872: Station opened as 'Scredington
- 1 February 1875: Station renamed Aswarby and Scredington
- 22 September 1930: Station closed
Location

Aswarby and Scredington railway station was a station close to Scredington, Lincolnshire on the Great Northern Railway Bourne and Sleaford railway. It opened in 1872 and closed in 1930. It was originally shown on maps as Aswarby Station, but by 1905 it was shown as Aswarby and Scredington Station.

== History ==
Opened by the Great Northern Railway (Great Britain), it became part of the London and North Eastern Railway during the Grouping of 1923, and was then closed by that company.

| Preceding station | Disused railways | Following station |
|---|---|---|
| Sleaford | Great Northern Railway; Bourne and Sleaford Railway | Billingborough and Horbling |
