= Thurlby railway station =

Former railway station in Lincolnshire, England

Coordinates: 52.7367°N 0.3836°W

Thurlby
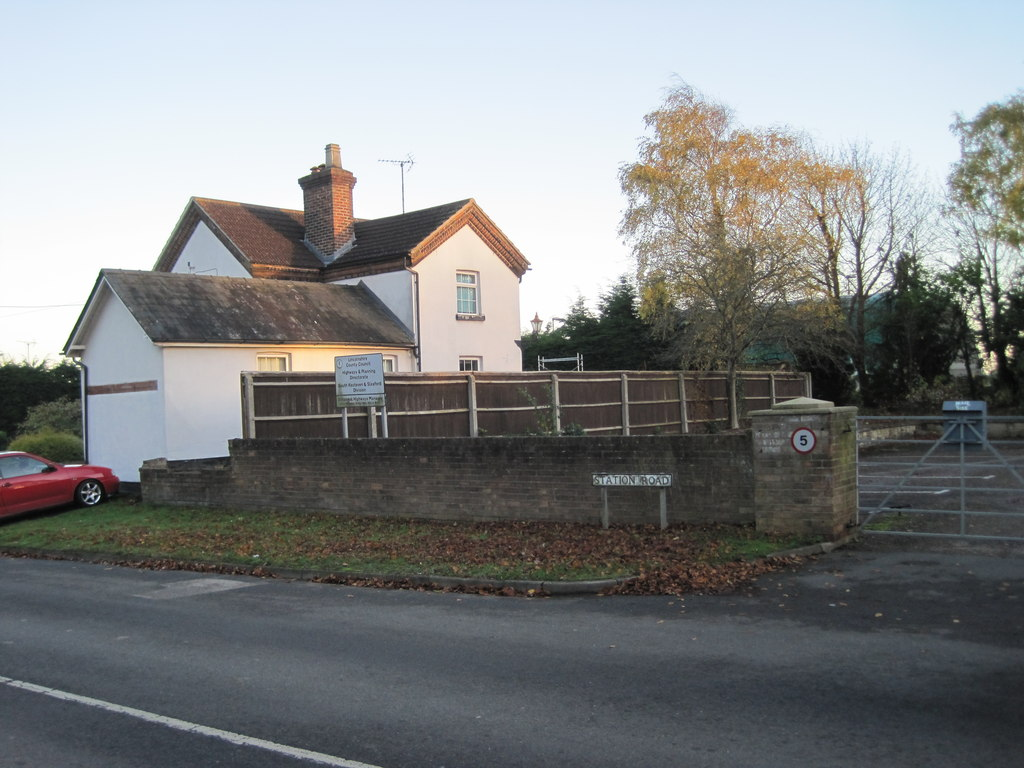
- The site of the station in 2012

General information
- Location: Thurlby, South Kesteven; England
- Grid reference: TF092166
- Platforms: 1

Other information
- Status: Disused

History
- Original company: Bourne and Essendine Railway
- Pre-grouping: Great Northern Railway
- Post-grouping: London and North Eastern Railway

Key dates
- 16 May 1860: Station opened
- 18 June 1951: Station closed
Location

Thurlby railway station was a station in Thurlby by Bourne, Lincolnshire on the Bourn and Essendine Railway between Essendine and Bourne. It was closed in 1951.

== History ==
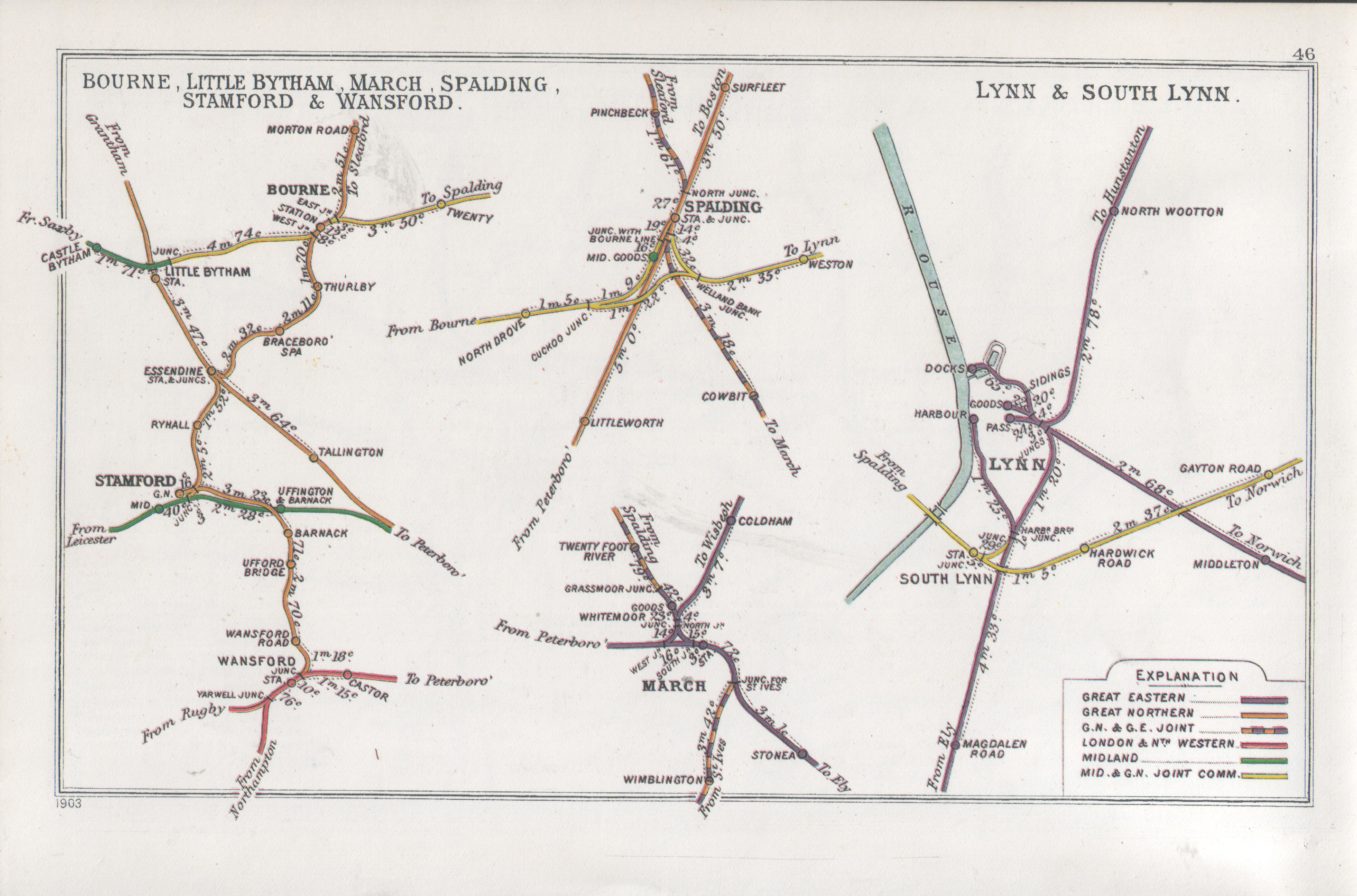
A 1903 Railway Clearing House Junction Diagram showing (left) railways in the vicinity of Thurlby

The station opened on 16 May 1860.

It closed on 18 June 1951.

Preceding station	Disused railways	Following station
Wilsthorpe Crossing Halt	Great Northern Railway Bourn and Essendine Railway	Bourne
