= Billingborough and Horbling railway station =

Former railway station in Lincolnshire, England

Billingborough and Horbling
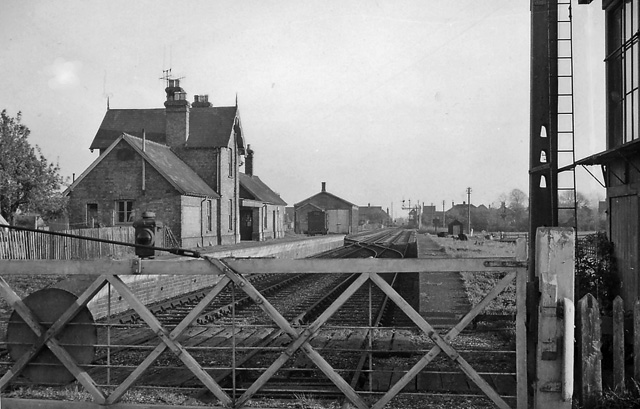
- Station in April 1961, before final closure

General information
- Location: Billingborough, South Kesteven; England
- Coordinates: 52.8946°N 0.3437°W
- Grid reference: TF115343
- Lines: Bourne & Sleaford
- Platforms: 2

Other information
- Status: Disused

History
- Original company: Great Northern Railway
- Pre-grouping: Great Northern Railway
- Post-grouping: LNER

Key dates
- 1872: opened
- 1930: closed (passengers)
- 1964: closed (goods)
Location

Billingborough and Horbling railway station was a station serving the villages of Billingborough, Horbling and Threekingham, Lincolnshire on the Great Northern Railway Bourne and Sleaford railway. It opened in 1872 and closed to passengers in 1930. The section from Bourne to Billingborough remained open for goods until 1964.

Preceding station	Disused railways	Following station
Aswarby and Scredington; Line and station closed	Great Northern Railway; Bourne and Sleaford Railway	Rippingale; Line and station closed
