= Wilsthorpe, Lincolnshire =

Village in South Kesteven, Lincolnshire, England

Coordinates: 52.711325°N 0.386268°W

Wilsthorpe
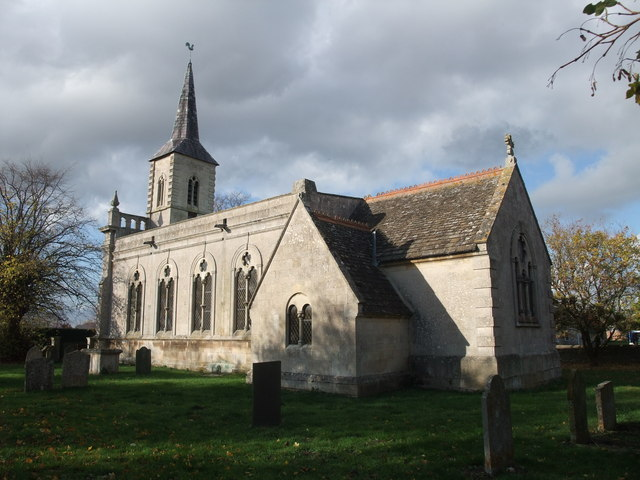
- St Faith's Church, Wilsthorpe

- Location within Lincolnshire
- OS grid reference: TF091138
  - London: 90 mi (140 km) SSE
- Civil parish: Braceborough and Wilsthorpe
- District: South Kesteven
- Shire county: Lincolnshire
- Region: East Midlands
- Country: England
- Sovereign state: United Kingdom
- Post town: Stamford
- Postcode district: PE9
- Police: Lincolnshire
- Fire: Lincolnshire
- Ambulance: East Midlands
- UK Parliament: Gainsborough

Wilsthorpe is a village in the civil parish of Braceborough and Wilsthorpe, in the South Kesteven district, in the county of Lincolnshire, England. It is situated approximately 6 miles (10 km) north-east from Stamford and approximately 4 miles (6 km) south from Bourne.

Wilsthorpe was formerly a chapelry in Greatford parish, in 1866 Wilsthorpe became a separate civil parish, on 1 April 1931 the parish was abolished and merged with Braceborough to form "Braceborough and Wilsthorpe. In 1921 the parish had a population of 60.

Wilsthorpe is mentioned in Domesday Book of 1086 when it was listed as having 20 households, 40 acres (0.2 km^{2}) of meadow, 12 acres (0.05 km^{2}) of woodland, and two mills.

A possible Roman villa has been located as cropmarks to the south-east of the village, and King Street is a Roman road.

The church is a Grade II* listed building dedicated to Saint Faith. Built in 1715, it was restored and altered by James Fowler of Louth in 1869. In the sanctuary is a late-13th-century effigy of a knight in chain mail; perhaps a Wake family member. Hereward the Wake was an Anglo-Saxon who led resistance to the Norman Conquest, and was born in or near Bourne.

To the west of the village is the former railway station of Braceborough Spa Halt which was on the Essendine and Bourne Railway line. It opened in 1860 and closed in 1951. The old station house is now a private house. In addition, Wilsthorpe Crossing Halt railway station was located to the north of the village.

Nearby is the pumping station house from the old Peterborough Waterworks with its 52 feet (15.8 m) deep artesian well drilled during the late 19th century when it provided a million gallons of water each day to supply the cathedral city 14 miles (23 km) away.

== Literature ==
Wilsthorpe appears as a real world location in "Mr. Humphreys and His Inheritance", a short ghost story by M. R. James first published in More Ghost Stories of an Antiquary in 1911.
