= Braceborough Spa Halt railway station =

Former railway station in Lincolnshire, England

Coordinates: 52.71600°N 0.41446°W

Braceborough Spa Halt
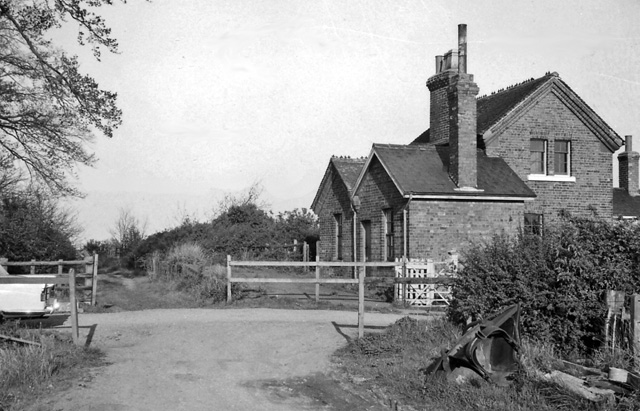
- The station in 1961

General information
- Location: Braceborough, South Kesteven; England
- Grid reference: TF072143

Other information
- Status: Disused

History
- Original company: Bourn and Essendine Railway
- Pre-grouping: Great Northern Railway
- Post-grouping: London and North Eastern Railway

Key dates
- 16 May 1860: Opened as Braceborough Spa
- 19 February 1934: renamed Braceborough Spa Halt
- 18 June 1951: Closed
Location

Braceborough Spa railway station was a station in Braceborough Spa, Lincolnshire on the Bourn and Essendine Railway between Essendine and Bourne. It was closed in 1951, along with the rest of the line.

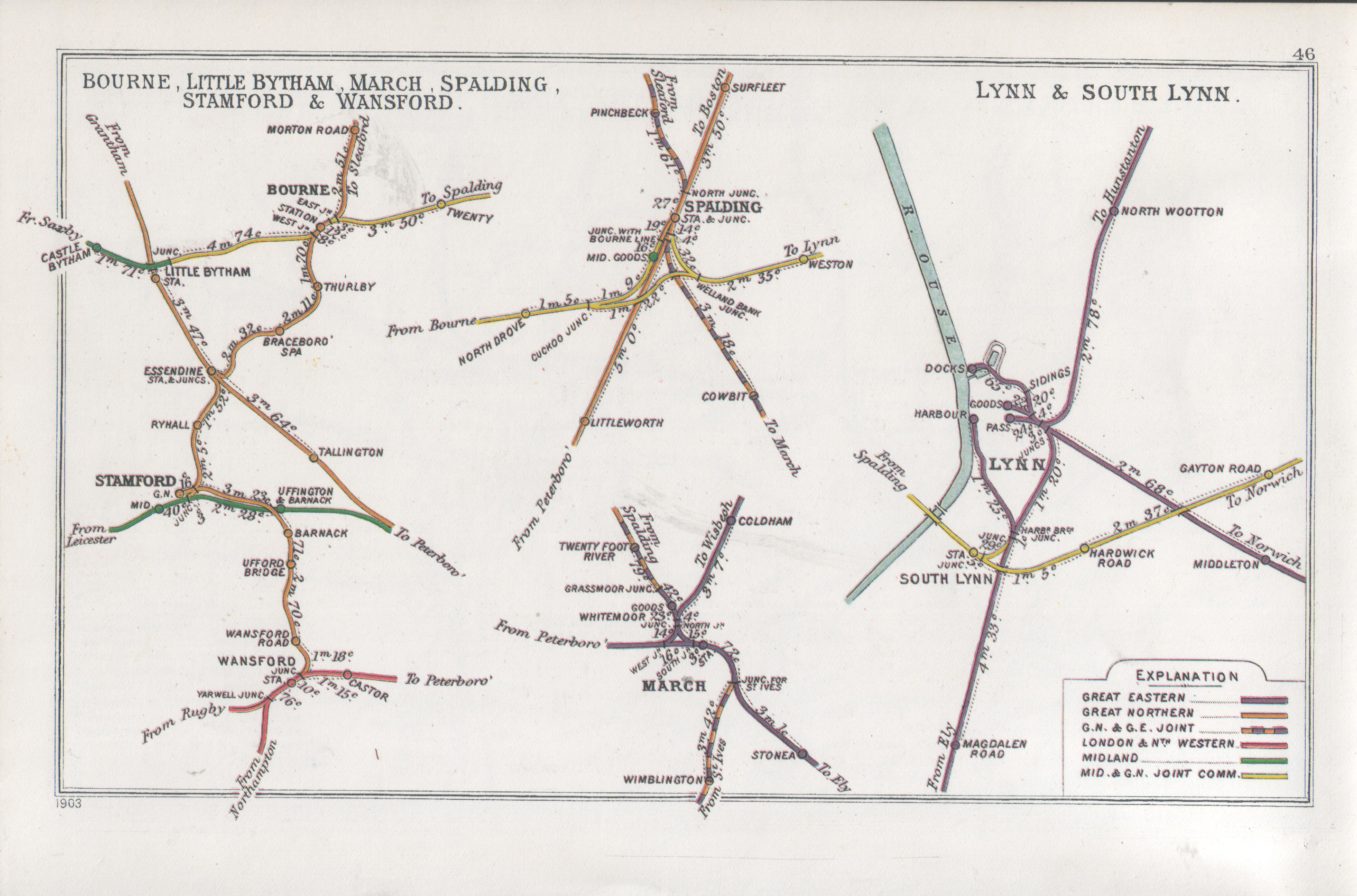
A 1903 Railway Clearing House Junction Diagram showing (left) railways in the vicinity of Braceborough Spa Halt (shown here as BRACEBORO' SPA)

Preceding station	Disused railways	Following station
Essendine	Great Northern Railway Bourn and Essendine Railway	Wilsthorpe Crossing Halt
