= Northorpe, South Kesteven =

Hamlet in Lincolnshire, England

Coordinates: 52.744294°N 0.375836°W

Northorpe
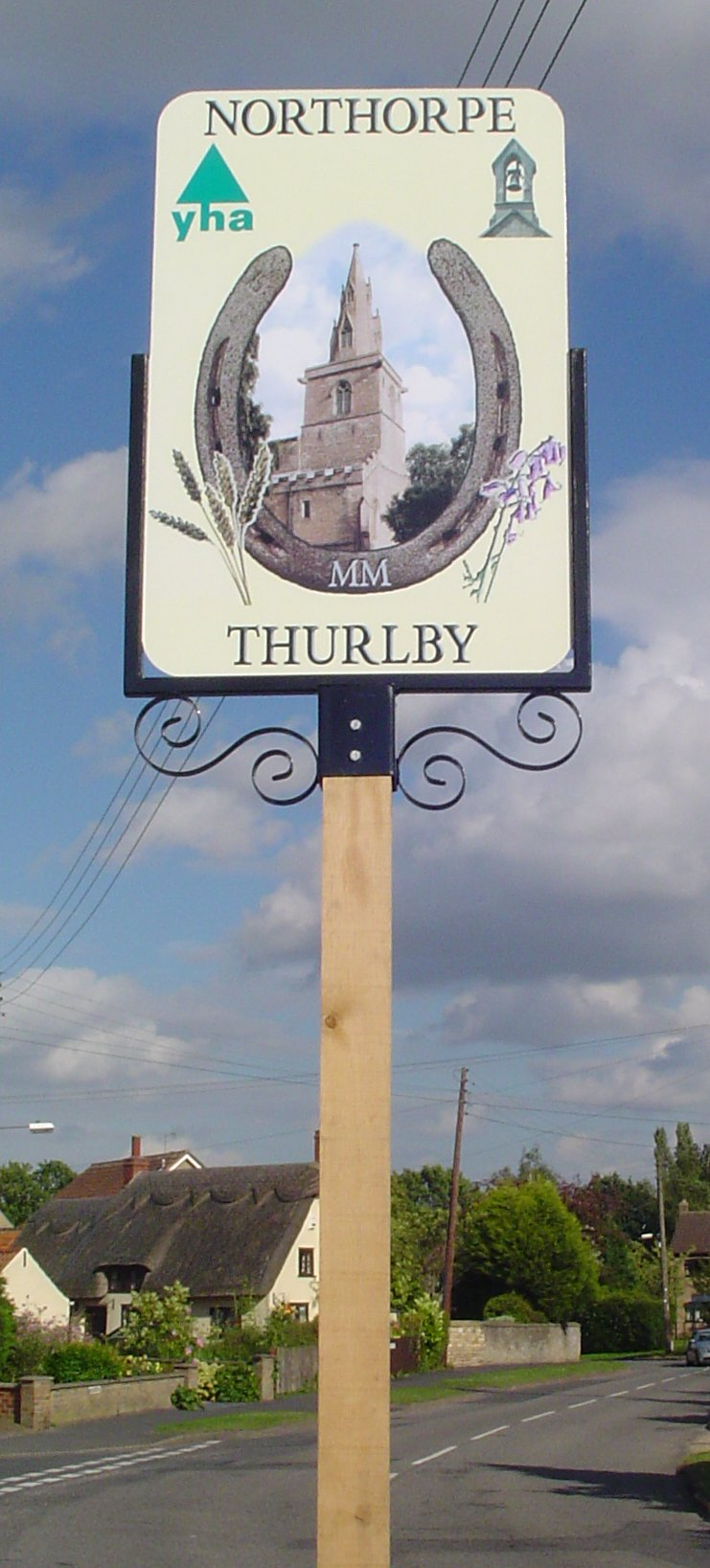
- Northorpe sign

- Location within Lincolnshire
- OS grid reference: TF097175
  - London: 85 mi (137 km) S
- District: South Kesteven
- Shire county: Lincolnshire
- Region: East Midlands
- Country: England
- Sovereign state: United Kingdom
- Post town: BOURNE
- Postcode district: PE10
- Dialling code: 01778
- Police: Lincolnshire
- Fire: Lincolnshire
- Ambulance: East Midlands
- UK Parliament: Grantham and Bourne

Northorpe is a hamlet in the civil parish of Thurlby (to which it is conjoined), in the South Kesteven district of Lincolnshire, England. It is situated about 1 mile (1.6 km) south from Bourne.

The village lies on the bus route between Bourne and Peterborough, run by Delaine along the A15.

Village amenities include a post box and a telephone box, although the telephone box has been disconnected by British Telecom and now adopted by the Parish Council.

Northorpe is near to Elsea and Math Woods, the latter associated with the tale of Nanny Rutt.

Thomas Minot, later Archbishop of Dublin, became parson here in 1349.

== See also ==
- Northorpe near Donington in South Holland
- Northorpe near Gainsborough in West Lindsey
