= Braceborough and Wilsthorpe =

Coordinates: 52.71°N 0.39°W

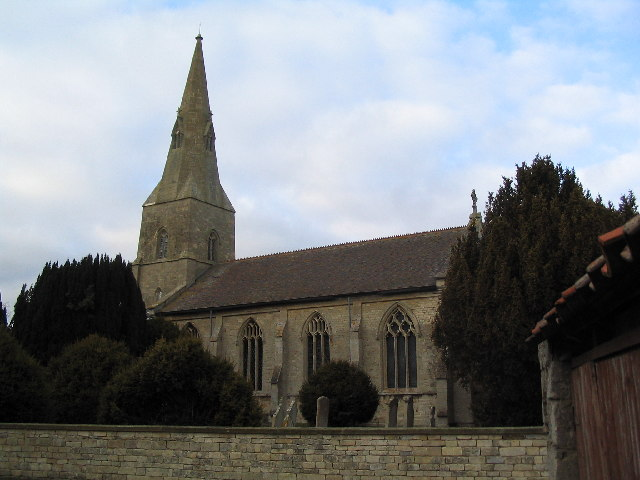
- St Margaret's Church, Braceborough

- Location within Lincolnshire
- Population: 305 (2011 census)
- OS grid reference: TF08751373
  - London: 80 mi (130 km) S
- Civil parish: Braceborough and Wilsthorpe
- District: South Kesteven
- Shire county: Lincolnshire
- Region: East Midlands
- Country: England
- Sovereign state: United Kingdom
- Post town: Stamford
- Postcode district: PE9
- Police: Lincolnshire
- Fire: Lincolnshire
- Ambulance: East Midlands
- UK Parliament: Grantham and Stamford

Braceborough and Wilsthorpe is a civil parish in the South Kesteven district of Lincolnshire, England. Braceborough and Wilsthorpe are less than 1 mile (1.6 km) apart, separated by the East Glen River. Braceborough and Wilsthorpe are located between the A6121 road, which goes from Stamford to Bourne, and the A15, this links Bourne and Market Deeping. It is approximately 12 miles (19 km) north-west from its nearest city, Peterborough. Before the 1930s Braceborough and Wilsthorpe were separate parishes but in 1931 the two were dissolved and joined together to form today's civil parish.

== History ==
Both Braceborough and Wilsthorpe are found in the 1086 Domesday Book. Braceborough varies in spelling as "Braseborg," "Breseburc" and Breseburg, whereas Wilsthorpe is spelt "Wivelestorp". At the time of Domesday, Wilsthorpe contained 20 households, and Braceborough, 13.5. Wilsthorpe households contained 10 villagers and 10 freemen; Braceborough had 6 villagers and 17 freemen. Both villages were classed as medium-sized settlements, and both had ploughlands: Braceborough with 5.5 ploughlands, worked by 5.5 men's plough teams, and Wilsthorpe with 4 ploughlands worked by 1 lord's plough teams and 2.5 men's plough teams. Each village had meadow land – both of 40 acres (0.16 km^{2}) – but Wilsthorpe had other resources such as 12 acres (0.05 km^{2}) of woodland and 2 mills. Braceborough was in the manor of Greatford which was assessed to have a taxable value of 5.5 geld units; the households were assessed at a quite large value of 4.5 geld units. Both Wilsthorpe and its head manor were assessed at a medium value of 4 geld units. The 2011 census shows that since Domesday the number of households has risen to 119.

In the 1870s Braceborough was described as: "...on river Glen, 5 miles SW. of Bourn, 2230 ac," and Wilsthorpe to be: "6 miles NE. of Stamford, pop. 81."

Braceborough had its own railway station known as Braceborough Spa. The station was opened by the Bourn and Essendine Railway on 16 May 1860, and was renamed Braceborough Spa Halt on 19 February 1934. It closed on 18 June 1951. The Bourn and Essendine Railway became part of the Great Northern Railway on 25 July 1864. The old station house has been privately owned since 1968.

== Population ==
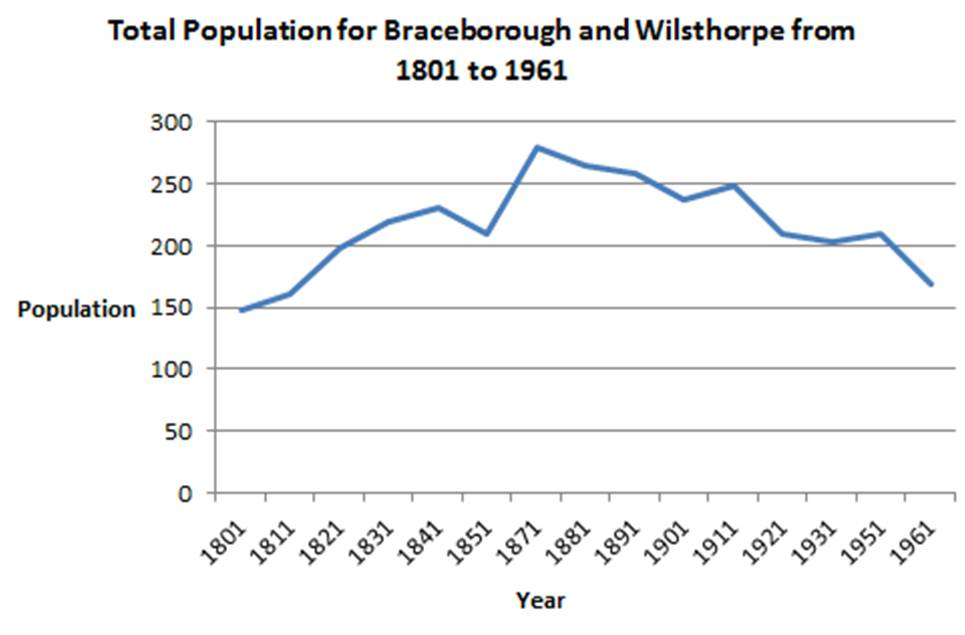
The graph shows the population change in the civil parish using census data

The 2011 Census gave civil parish population as 305, an increase in population from the 268 recorded in the 2001 Census. The graph shows a steady rise in population for the first 40 census years. However, in 1971 there is a sharp drop in population to just above 200 – by the following census the population had recovered and peaked. Since the 1980s there has been a steady decline in population size, until recently, when it began to grow once again.

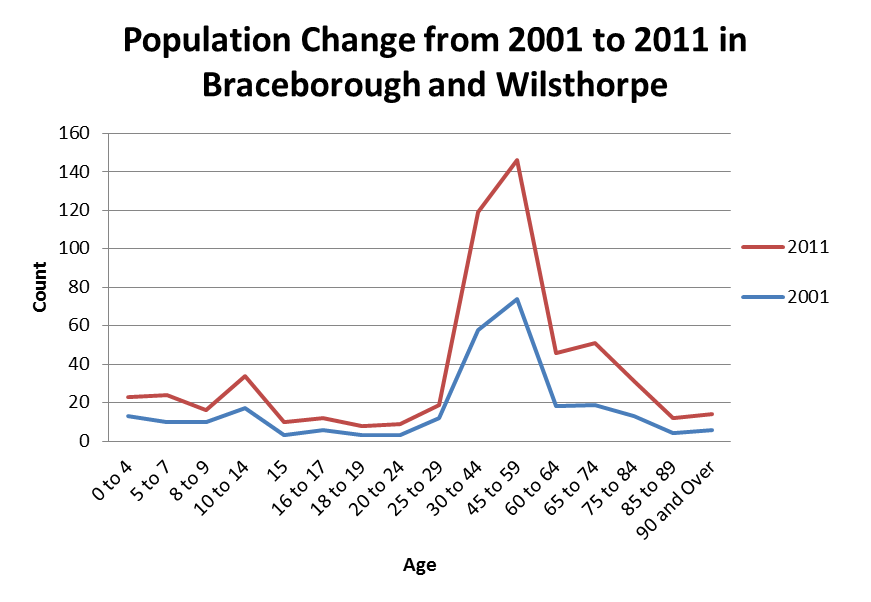
Source: Office for National Statistics

Data from the 2001 and 2011 census shows that the majority of the population of the civil parish consists of people aged 30 to 59, shown in the steep rise on the graph. The proportion of the population this group holds has remained steady since the 2001 census, changing from 132 to 133. However, the civil parish's older population of over-65's has increased from 42 to 66 in the 10-year period. The population of under-30's was 77 in 2001, and increased by 1 to 78. The teenage population, 16- to 19-year-olds, was 18 in 2011.

== Landmarks ==
The Church of St Margaret in Braceborough and the church of St Faith in Wilsthorpe are both listed buildings under the Planning (Listed Buildings and Conservation Areas) Act 1990 as amended for its special architectural or historic interest. St Margaret's is listed as Grade I and St Faith's, Grade II*, both churches being of outstanding architectural or historic interest. In 1715 James Fowler restored St Faith's and later in 1859 a Mr. Kirk of Sleaford restored the church of St Margaret. Both Churches are part of the Uffington Group in the Stamford Deanery of the Diocese of Lincoln. The incumbent is The Revd Carolyn Kennedy.

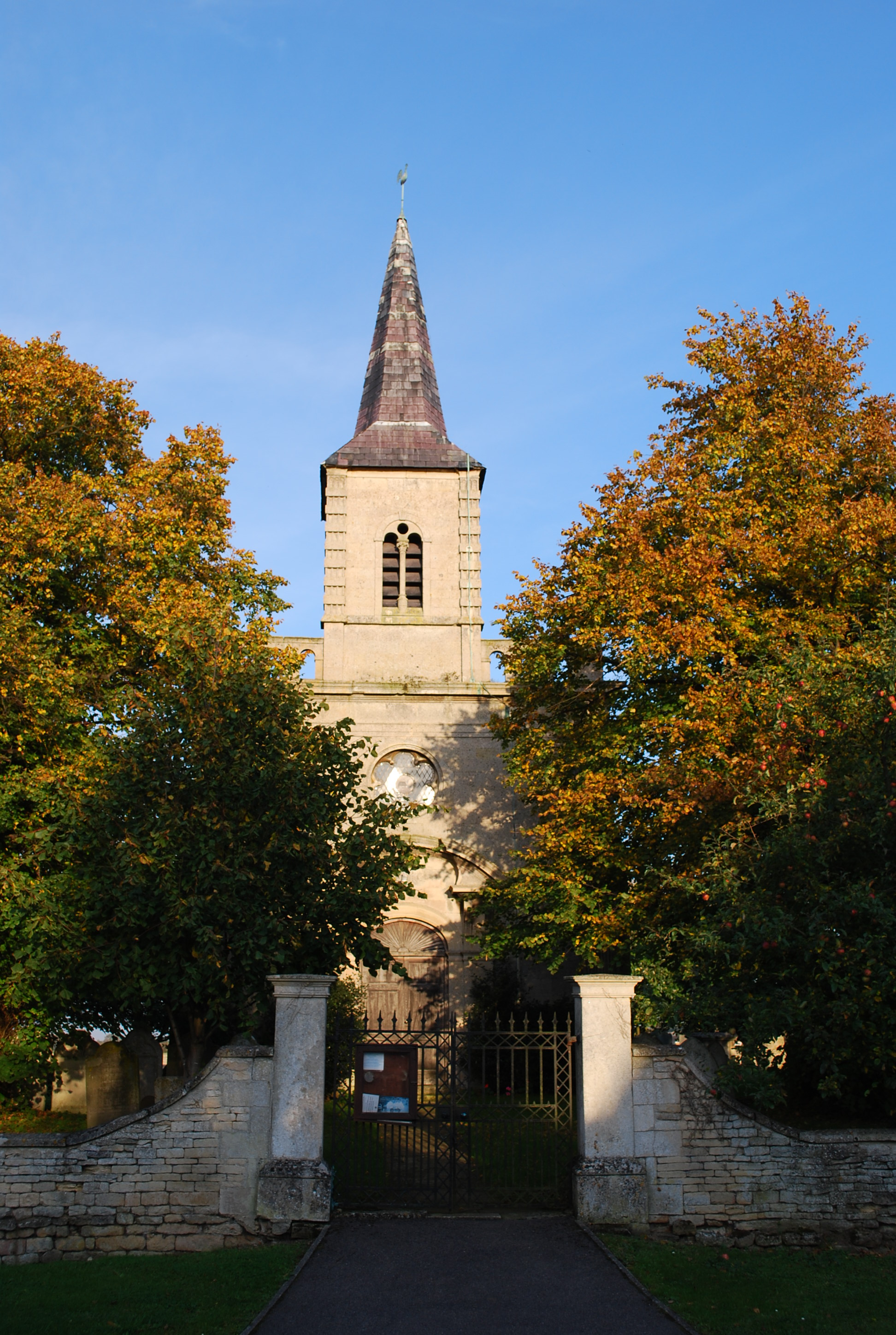
St Faith's Church, Wilsthorpe

The civil parish has numerous listed buildings, particularly Grade II listed. One in particular is the Grade II Old Rectory in Elliot's Way, Braceborough. The Old Rectory, of Tudor style, was built in 1848 by William Thompson. Other listed buildings include Braceborough's Grade II Old Hall Farmhouse, built in the late 17th century.

In Wilsthorpe is the site of a possible Roman villa discovered through aerial photography which identified cropmarks. The villa is described as: "...aisled timber building of four bays, standing close to a rectangular enclosure, which was bounded by a ditch."
