= Braceborough =

Village in the South Kesteven district of Lincolnshire, England

Coordinates: 52.700785°N 0.40536493°W

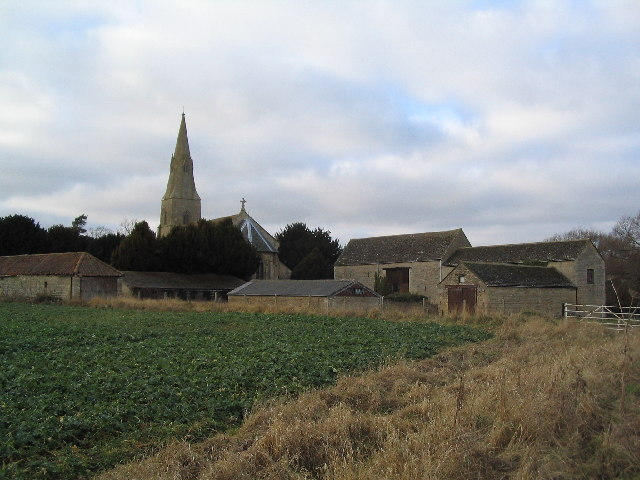
- Braceborough

- Location within Lincolnshire
- OS grid reference: TF078126
  - London: 80 mi (130 km) S
- Civil parish: Braceborough and Wilsthorpe
- District: South Kesteven
- Shire county: Lincolnshire
- Region: East Midlands
- Country: England
- Sovereign state: United Kingdom
- Post town: Stamford
- Postcode district: PE9
- Police: Lincolnshire
- Fire: Lincolnshire
- Ambulance: East Midlands
- UK Parliament: Grantham and Stamford

Braceborough is a village in the civil parish of Braceborough and Wilsthorpe, in the South Kesteven district of Lincolnshire, England. It is situated off the Stamford to Bourne A6121 road, just west of the A15 as it runs between Market Deeping and Bourne. In 1921 the parish had a population of 150. On 1 April 1931 the parish was abolished and merged with Wilsthorpe to form "Braceborough and Wilsthorpe".

The ecclesiastical parish has equivalent boundaries to the civil parish. It is part of the Uffington Group in the Aveland & Ness with Stamford Deanery of the Diocese of Lincoln. The incumbent is Rev Carolyn Kennedy.

The Grade I listed Anglican parish church is dedicated to St Margaret. It was almost entirely rebuilt in 1837.

During the Second World War Braceborough Hall housed elements of the Women's Land Army; it is now a retirement home.

== Braceborough Spa ==
Near Braceborough is Braceborough Spa which had its own railway station, Braceborough Spa Halt, on the independent Essendine to Bourne Railway. It became part of Great Northern Railway. The line was closed in June 1951.

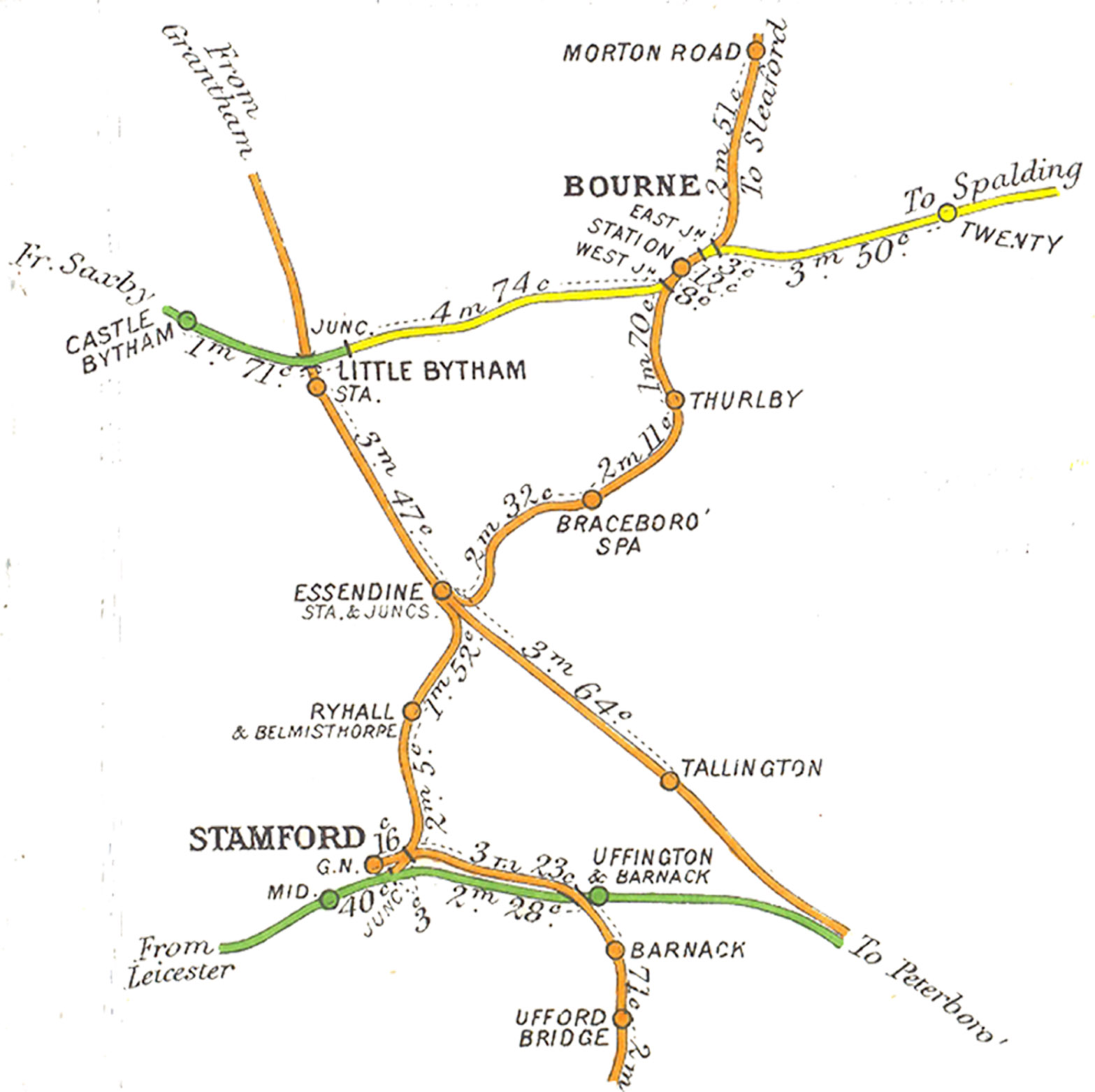
Detail of 1903 Railway Clearing House diagram showing the railway station

Braceborough Spa, rising in the grounds of Spa House, was popular in the Victorian era for its natural spring waters. As with many Victorian Spas, Braceborough's declined in favour of more modern forms of medical treatment, and finally closed in 1939.
