= Scredington =

Village and civil parish in the North Kesteven district of Lincolnshire, England

Coordinates: 52.951120°N 0.37282°W

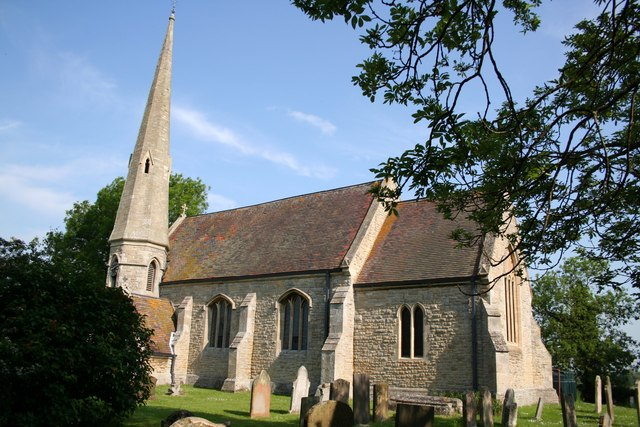
- Church of St Andrew, Scredington

- Location within Lincolnshire
- Population: 283 (2011)
- OS grid reference: TF094405
  - London: 100 mi (160 km) S
- District: North Kesteven
- Shire county: Lincolnshire
- Region: East Midlands
- Country: England
- Sovereign state: United Kingdom
- Post town: Sleaford
- Postcode district: NG34
- Police: Lincolnshire
- Fire: Lincolnshire
- Ambulance: East Midlands
- UK Parliament: Grantham and Bourne

Scredington is a village and civil parish in the North Kesteven district of Lincolnshire, England.

The population of the civil parish at the 2011 census was 283. It is situated 3.5 miles (5.6 km) south-east from the town of Sleaford.

Scredington church, on Church Lane, is dedicated to Saint Andrew.

== See also ==
- Aswarby and Scredington railway station
