= Church of St Mary Magdalene, Essendine =

Church in Essendine, Rutland, England

Coordinates: 52°42′10″N 0°26′56″W

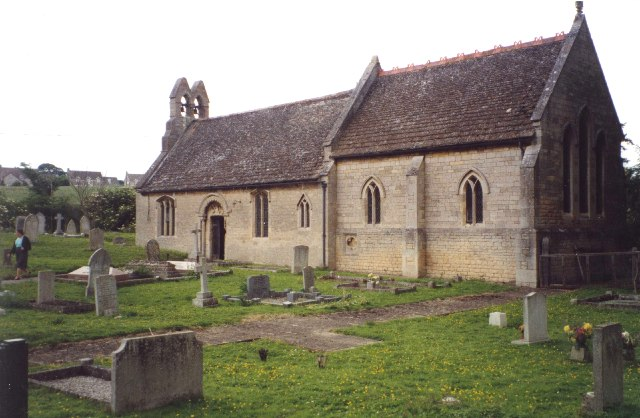
- Church of St Mary Magdalene, Essendine
- Denomination: Church of England

History
- Dedication: St Mary Magdalene

Administration
- Diocese: Peterborough
- Parish: Essendine, Rutland

Clergy
- Vicar: Jo Saunders

The Church of St Mary Magdalene is a church in Essendine, Rutland. It is a Grade II* listed building.

== History ==
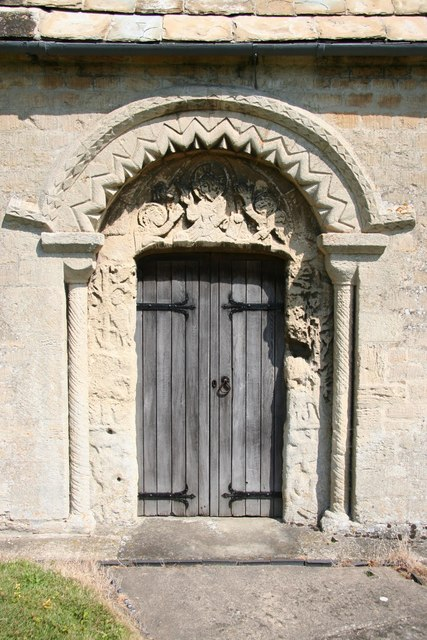
Norman south doorway and tympanum

The small church is built within the remains of the castle, which appears to have been an early Norman bailey, later developing into a strongly fortified manor. The moat of the outer bailey and sometimes the church and churchyard are flooded by the West Glen River.

The church is made up of a chancel and a nave dating to the 12th and 13th centuries. The church has no tower but does have a double bell-cote.

The church has a notable Norman tympanum over its south door. The tympanum has a carving of Christ in Majesty with angels. The door of the church probably dates back to the 12th century but some suggest it is Anglo-Saxon.
