= Twenty railway station =

Former railway station in Lincolnshire, England

Twenty
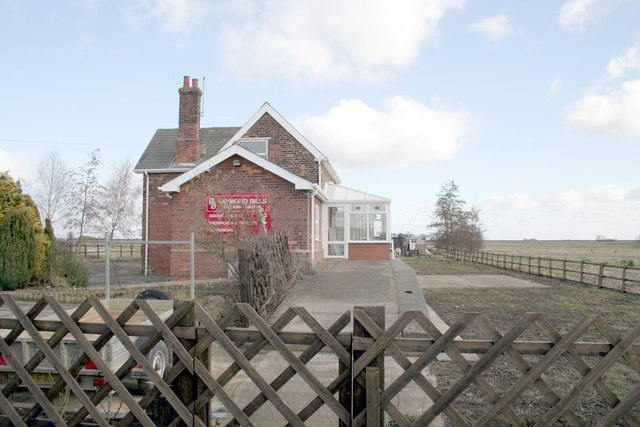
- Former station building, now a double glazing works

General information
- Location: Twenty, South Kesteven, Lincolnshire; England
- Coordinates: 52.76944°N 0.29028°W
- Grid reference: TF154204
- Platforms: 2

Other information
- Status: Disused

History
- Original company: Spalding and Bourn Railway
- Pre-grouping: Midland and Great Northern Joint Railway
- Post-grouping: Midland and Great Northern Joint Railway

Key dates
- 1 August 1866: Opened
- 9 October 1880: Closed
- 1 February 1881: Reopened
- 2 March 1959: Closed for passengers
- 30 March 1964: closed for freight
Location

Twenty railway station served the village of Twenty in Lincolnshire, England. It was on the route of the Spalding and Bourn Railway (opened 1866), later part of the Midland and Eastern Railway and then part of the Midland and Great Northern Joint Railway main line between the Midlands and the Norfolk Coast.

== History ==
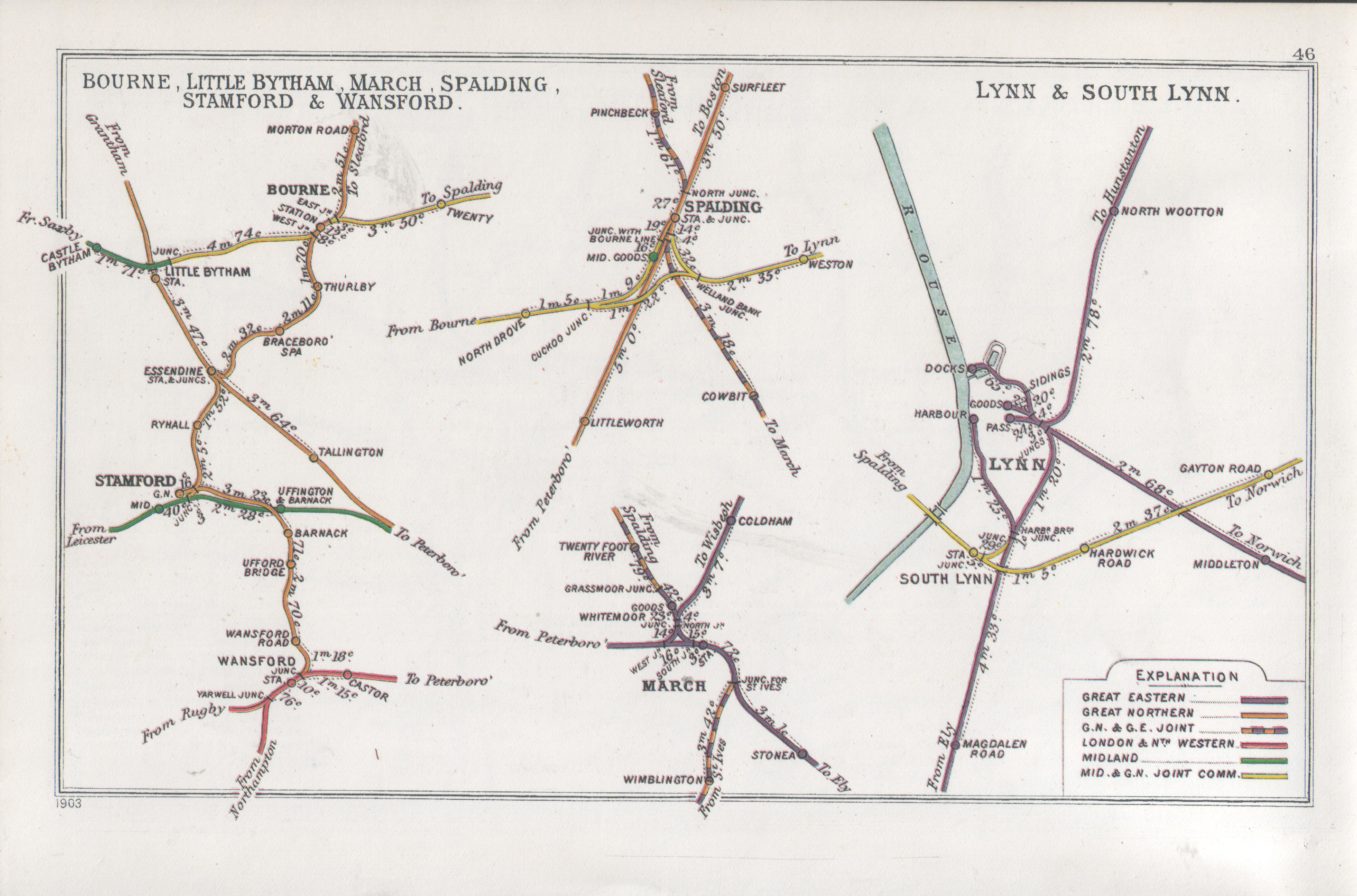
A 1903 Railway Clearing House map of railways in the vicinity of Twenty (left)

The station opened with the line on 1 August 1866, closed temporarily between 9 October 1880 and 1 February 1881, and closed permanently on 2 March 1959, although the line remained open for goods until 1964.

Former Services

Preceding station	Disused railways	Following station
Bourne Line and station closed	Midland and Great Northern Joint Railway	Counter Drain Line and station closed

The former station buildings are still extant, unusually for this line, and in use for a business premises.
