= Barholm =

Village in the South Kesteven district of Lincolnshire, England

Coordinates: 52.67°N 00.38°W

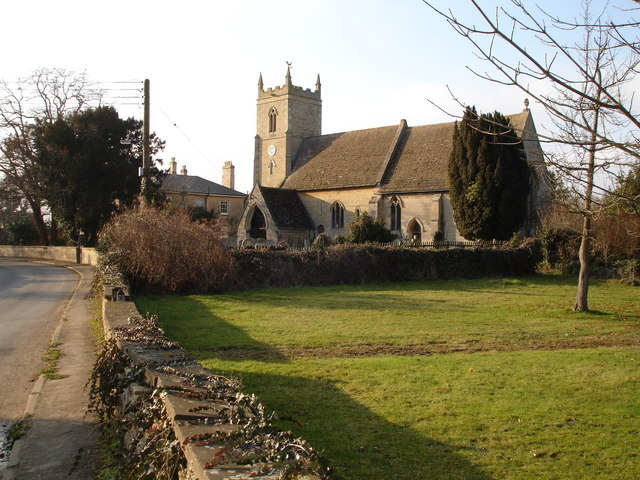
- St Martin's Church, Barholm

- Location within Lincolnshire
- OS grid reference: TF0910
  - London: 80 mi (130 km) S
- Civil parish: Barholm and Stowe
- District: South Kesteven
- Shire county: Lincolnshire
- Region: East Midlands
- Country: England
- Sovereign state: United Kingdom
- Post town: Stamford
- Postcode district: PE9
- Police: Lincolnshire
- Fire: Lincolnshire
- Ambulance: East Midlands
- UK Parliament: Grantham and Stamford

Barholm /ˈbærəm/ is a village in the civil parish of Barholm and Stowe, in the South Kesteven district of Lincolnshire, England. It is 2 miles (3 km) west from the A15 road, and 6 miles (10 km) south from Bourne. In 1921 the parish had a population of 170.

Barholm is first recorded as "Berc(a)ham" in 1086; the name is from Old English beorg + hām or hamm and means "homestead or enclosure on a hill."

Hereward (later known as Hereward the Wake) owned land in Barholm and the nearby village of Stowe in the period before the Norman Conquest in 1066.

St Martin's Church is Grade I listed. The church received a new tower during the English Civil War and an inscription with the date 1648 reads:

"Was ever such a thing
Since the Creation?
A new steeple built
In the time of vexation."

== Local government ==
On 1 April 1931 the parish was abolished and merged with Stowe to form "Barholm and Stowe", part also went to Market Deeping, Baston and Langtoft. Barholm and Stowe parish is run through a parish meeting of its residents rather than a parish council. Two district councillors represent Casewick Ward on South Kesteven District Council and a county councillor represents Deepings West & Rural Division on Lincolnshire County Council. The district councillors elected in 2023 are Rosemary Trollope-Bellew (Con) and Vanessa Smith (Green). The county councillor elected in 2021 is Ashley Baxter (Ind).
