= Nanny Rutt =

Local English cautionary tale

Coordinates: 52°44′55″N 0°22′45″W

Nanny Rutt is a character in a cautionary tale associated with Nanny Rutt's well, an artesian spring in Math Wood, near Northorpe, in the parish of Thurlby, Lincolnshire. The story goes that a named girl went into the wood, to the well and disappeared having been taken off by Nanny Rutt.

== The story ==
The story of Nanny Rutt, being an oral tradition, varies depending on who is telling the story. There are, however, some features that are common to all versions of the tale. The following is the central parts of the story, supplemented by additional details that may or may not be included, depending on the individual story teller.

The story begins with a young girl, given different names in versions, who had arranged to meet with a lover at the well in Math wood. The girl sets off into the wood in the early evening, but on her way, meets an old woman wrapped in a shawl that casts a deep shadow on her face in the evening light. A conversation between the old woman and the girl ensues, and she is warned about the dangers of the wood at night, as well as those of eloping without the permission of her parents.

Ignoring these warnings, the girl continues on her way, and finds her way to the source of the well, deep inside the wood, where she had arranged to meet her lover. Here she waits for a long time, to no result. By the time she realises that her lover is not coming, it is very dark. Tears from the rejection form in her eyes, clouding her vision. Her vision was already poor due to the darkness of the woods, and the girl soon becomes hopelessly lost. Eventually, she stumbles upon a clearing in the woods, which holds an overgrown stone building, little bigger than a small shack. In the doorway stands the old woman, her shawl now pulled back to reveal a hideous face lit by the ghostly moonlight. As she turns to run she stumbles and falls. The old woman’s shadow falls on her as she advances, freezing her body with a paralysing chill, and her throat goes dry as she tries to scream. The girl is never seen again.

== Assessment of the story ==
The date of origin of the story is obscure but it was current in the 1920s and is likely to be earlier. Parents used to use it to warn their children against wandering in the wood. In this respect, Nanny Rutt was a form of the Bogeyman. It is probably not coincidental that le rut is a French word derived from the Latin rugitus meaning 'sexual drive'. The word occurs too, in English but is there used for male non-human mammals, especially of the deer group and goats. The males are said to be 'in rut' while female mammals are 'on heat'. The French word applies to either sex and may include people. Rodin included it among the sins scattered on a version of his 'Gates of Hell'. Nanny Rutt's first name is perhaps a little less explicit. Goats are sometimes used as a byword for male sexuality but a nanny goat is a female one. The word 'Nanny' is also used both as a colloquial term for a grandmother, and can also mean childminder.

It may be possible to suggest an explanation for the story of the disappearance. Perhaps at some date a girl took her developing sexuality into Math wood, met someone who complemented it and was soon taken off to a home for un-married mothers never to return to Northorpe. An explanation was required for the other young people and at a time of reticence about sexuality, Nanny Rutt was invented. If this happened when the use of the French language in England was remembered, the story is medieval. Nanny Rutt could also be based on a real woman who once lived in the woods.
