= Obthorpe =

Hamlet in Thurlby, Lincolnshire, England

Coordinates: 52.723°N 0.382°W

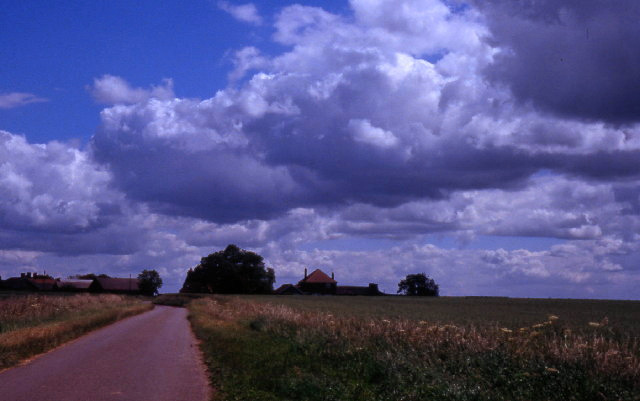
- Obthorpe Manor Farm

- Location within Lincolnshire
- OS grid reference: TF094152
  - London: 85 mi (137 km) S
- Civil parish: Thurlby
- District: South Kesteven
- Shire county: Lincolnshire
- Region: East Midlands
- Country: England
- Sovereign state: United Kingdom
- Post town: Bourne
- Postcode district: PE10
- Police: Lincolnshire
- Fire: Lincolnshire
- Ambulance: East Midlands
- UK Parliament: Grantham and Stamford

Obthorpe is a hamlet in the civil parish of Thurlby, in the South Kesteven district of Lincolnshire, England. It lies 3 miles (5 km) south from Bourne, 6 miles (10 km) north-east from Stamford and less than 1 mile (1.6 km) west from the A15. Thurlby is the nearest village, 1 mile (1.6 km) to the north.

The house known as Obthorpe Lodge lies about 1 mile due east from the hamlet; both are on the Macmillan Way footpath.

Obthorpe is mentioned in the Domesday account as "Opetorp". The manor comprised 19 households and 17 freemen, and had a meadow and woodland, both of 20 acres (0.081 km^{2}). Lordship in 1066 was held by Ulf Fenman, transferred to Gilbert of Ghent in 1086, who was also Tenant-in-chief.
