= Essendine railway station =

Former Railway Station in Rutland, England

Coordinates: 52.6996°N 0.4529°W

Essendine
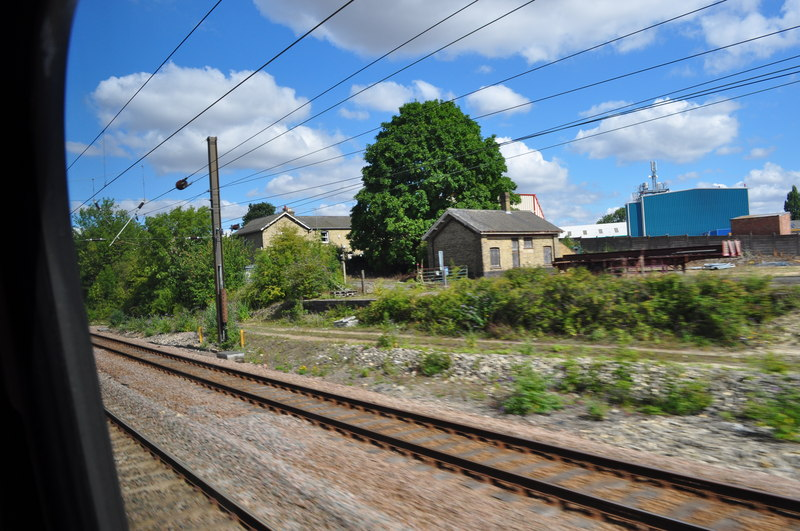
- Site of former goods yard, from Leeds-bound train, 2010-08-11

General information
- Location: Essendine, Rutland; England
- Grid reference: TF046124
- Platforms: 4

Other information
- Status: Disused

History
- Pre-grouping: Great Northern Railway
- Post-grouping: London North Eastern Railway; Eastern Region of British Railways

Key dates
- 2 October 1853: Opened
- 15 June 1959: Closed
Location

The location of Essendine Station within Rutland. It served the village of Essendine from 1853 to 1959.

Essendine railway station was a station in Essendine, Rutland. It was situated on the East Coast Main Line of the Great Northern Railway.

== Overview ==
The main line and the station opened in 1853. The Stamford and Essendine Railway branch line to Stamford and the line to Bourne were opened in 1856 and 1860. Due to its status as a junction, it was served by some express trains as well as by stopping trains. For many years a commuter train left King's Cross at around 5pm and terminated at Essendine, before returning the next morning. The Bourne branch closed in 1951. The Stamford branch closed in 1959 along with Essendine station itself and the Peterborough to Grantham local services. Peterborough to Grantham is the longest distance between adjacent stations in England.

The 'South' Signal-box at Essendine was enlarged, not long after it was built, and by the time the station closed, had well over a hundred levers. Many of these, however had become 'spare' by that time. About the first 21 or 22 were for working the Bourne Branch and some related sidings.

== Record ==
The world speed record for steam locomotives at 125.88 mph (202.58 km/h) was achieved on 3 July 1938 by LNER Class A4 4468 Mallard. Taking place on the slight downwards grade of Stoke Bank south of Grantham on the East Coast Main Line, the highest speed was recorded at milepost 90¼, between Little Bytham and Essendine. It broke the German (DRG Class 05) 002's 1936 record of 124 mph (200.4 km/h).

== Summary of former services ==
Preceding station	Historical railways	Following station
Tallington Line open, station closed	Great Northern Railway East Coast Main Line	Little Bytham Line open, station closed
Disused railways
Ryhall	Great Northern Railway Stamford and Essendine Railway	Terminus
Terminus	Great Northern Railway Bourn and Essendine Railway	Braceborough Spa

== London services ==
In 1863 there were 5 services to London with a best time of 2 hours 30 min via the York - London train at 13.30. In April 1910 this had improved to 10 services, although some required a change at Peterborough, and the best time was 1 hour 46 mins via the Nottingham - London express at 08.54. By July 1922, this had reduced to 7 services, with the best time now being 2 hours 10 mins via the Leeds - London express at 10.10. In 2009, it is possible to travel to London by public transport in under 2 hours. The fastest route is by bus to Stamford and then train to London, changing at Peterborough.

== Train timetable for July 1922 ==
The table below shows the train departures from Essendine on weekdays in July 1922.

Departure	Going to	Calling at	Arrival	Operator
06.35	York	Grantham, Newark, Retford, Ranskill, Bawtry, Doncaster, Selby, York. Also through coaches to Leeds and Bradford	09.18	GNR
06.40	Stamford East	Ryhall & Belmesthorpe, Stamford East	06.50	GNR
07.59	Retford	Little Bytham, Corby, Great Ponton, Grantham, Barkston, Hougham, Claypole, Newark, Carlton, Crow Park, Dukeries Junction, Tuxford, Retford	09.45	GNR
08.10	Stamford East	Ryhall & Belmesthorpe, Stamford East	08.20	GNR
08.30	Bourne	Braceborough Spa, Thurlby, Bourne	08.50	GNR
08.54	London Kings Cross	Peterborough North, Yaxley, Holme, Huntingdon, Offord, St Neots, Sandy, Biggleswade, Hitchin, Finsbury Park, London Kings Cross	11.15	GNR
08.56	Stamford East	Ryhall & Belmesthorpe, Stamford East	09.06	GNR
09.52	Grantham	Little Bytham, Corby, Great Ponton, Grantham	10.35	GNR
10.05	Stamford East	Ryhall & Belmesthorpe, Stamford East	10.15	GNR
10.05	Bourne	Braceborough Spa, Thurlby, Bourne	10.25	GNR
10.10	London Kings Cross	Tallington, Peterborough North, Finsbury Park, London Kings Cross	12.20	GNR
11.07	Grantham	Little Bytham, Corby, Great Ponton, Grantham	11.40	GNR
11.27	Peterborough North	Tallington, Peterborough North	11.46	GNR
11.30	Bourne	Braceborough Spa, Thurlby, Bourne	11.45	GNR
11.35	Stamford East	Ryhall & Belmesthorpe, Stamford East	11.45	GNR
13.25	Peterborough North	Peterborough North	13.41	GNR
13.30	Stamford East	Ryhall & Belmesthorpe, Stamford East	13.39	GNR
13.58	York	Grantham, Newark, Retford, Ranskill, Bawtry, Doncaster, Selby, York	16.22	GNR
14.08	Retford	Little Bytham, Corby, Great Ponton, Grantham, Barkston, Hougham, Claypole, Newark, Carlton, Crow Park, Dukeries Junction, Tuxford, Retford	15.48	GNR
14.10	Stamford East	Ryhall & Belmesthorpe, Stamford East	14.20	GNR
14.22	Bourne	Braceborough Spa, Thurlby, Bourne	14.37	GNR
15.50	Grantham	Grantham	16.11	GNR
15.59	London Kings Cross	Peterborough North, Huntingdon, Sandy, Biggleswade, Hitchin, Finsbury Park, London Kings Cross	18.20	GNR
16.05	Stamford East	Ryhall & Belmesthorpe, Stamford East	16.15	GNR
16.05	Bourne	Braceborough Spa, Thurlby, Bourne	16.25	GNR
17.17	Peterborough North	Tallington, Peterborough North	17.36	GNR
17.17	Retford	Little Bytham, Corby, Great Ponton, Grantham, Barkston, Hougham, Claypole, Newark, Carlton, Crow Park, Dukeries Junction, Tuxford, Retford	19.00	GNR
17.25	Stamford East	Ryhall & Belmesthorpe, Stamford East	17.35	GNR
17.25	Bourne	Braceborough Spa, Thurlby, Bourne	17.40	GNR
18.48	Grantham	Little Bytham, Grantham	19.13	GNR
18.58	London Kings Cross	Peterborough North, Huntingdon, Sandy, Biggleswade, Hitchin, Finsbury Park, London Kings Cross	11.46	GNR
19.09	Stamford East	Ryhall & Belmesthorpe, Stamford East	19.19	GNR
19.12	Bourne	Braceborough Spa, Thurlby, Bourne	19.26	GNR
21.05	Peterborough North	Tallington, Peterborough North	21.24	GNR
