= Bourne railway station =

Former railway station in Lincolnshire, England

Coordinates: 52.76398°N 0.37774°W

Bourne
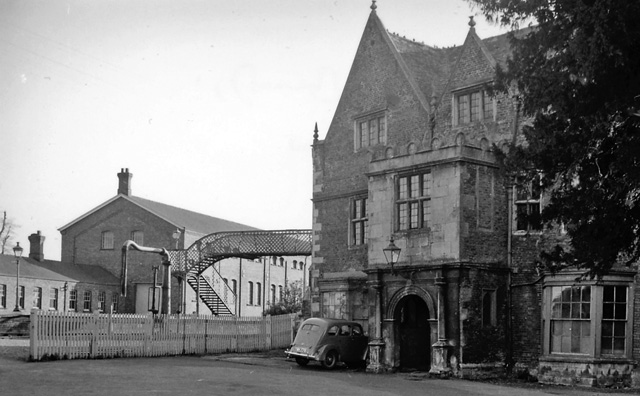
- The station approach in 1961

General information
- Location: Bourne, South Kesteven; England
- Grid reference: TF095197
- Platforms: 2

Other information
- Status: Disused

History
- Original company: Bourn and Essendine Railway
- Pre-grouping: Great Northern Railway
- Post-grouping: London and North Eastern Railway; Eastern Region of British Railways

Key dates
- 16 May 1860: Opened (Bourne)
- May 1872: Renamed (Bourn)
- 1 July 1893: Renamed (Bourne)
- 2 March 1959: Closed for passengers
- 5 April 1965: closed for freight
Location

Bourne was a railway station serving the town of Bourne in Lincolnshire, which opened in 1860 and closed to passengers in 1959.

== History ==
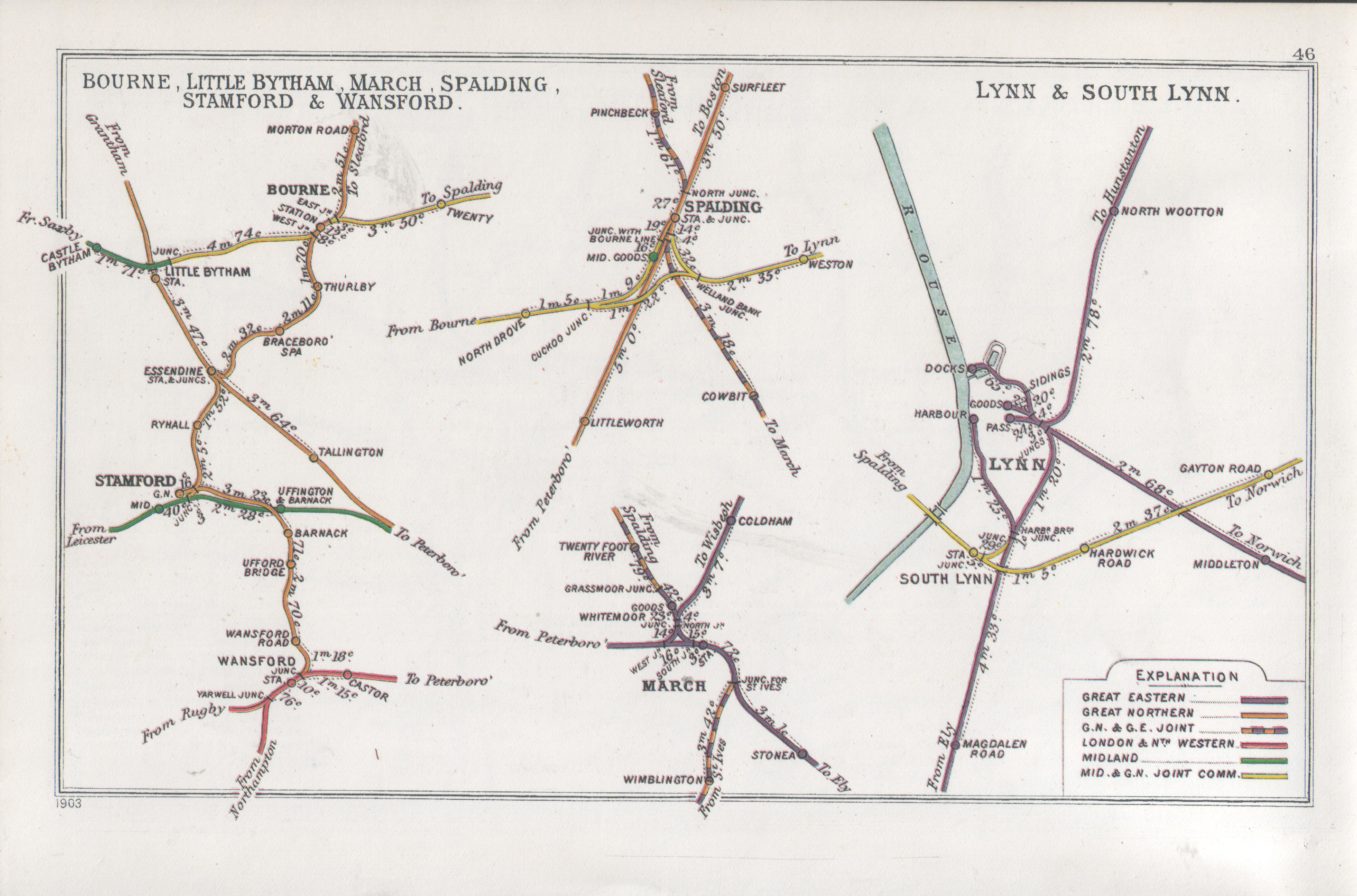
A 1903 Railway Clearing House map of railways in the vicinity of Bourne (left). GNR in brown; M&GN in yellow.

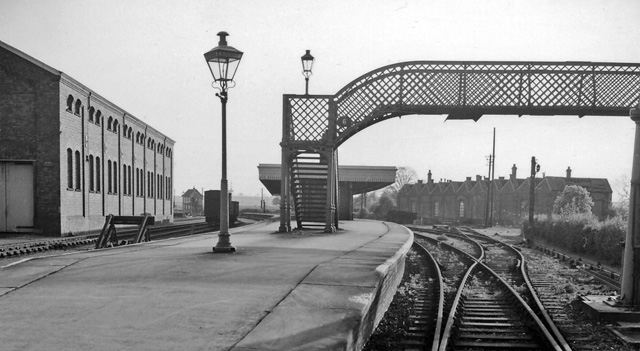
View southwards, towards Essendine in 1961

The station was on the Midland and Great Northern Joint Railway main line between the Midlands and the Norfolk Coast. It was finally closed in 1959 when the M&GN was closed. The line from Spalding and also the Sleaford branch as far as Billingborough remained in use for goods until 1964. The remaining station buildings were demolished in 2005 to make way for new residential development.

The original station opened in 1860 as the terminus of the Bourn and Essendine Railway, which provided connecting services to the Great Northern main line, and the local Stamford and Essendine Railway. It was this company which took over the Red Hall rather than demolishing it. The line was operated by the GNR, and later owned by them. The line was closed in June 1951.

The next development was the opening of the Bourne and Spalding Railway in 1866, converting the site into a through station.

In 1870, the Great Northern exercised its powers to build the Bourne and Sleaford Railway, opening in 1872. Although operated by the same company, this line was run separately from the Essendine line, and had its own goods yard. This line closed to passengers in 1930 although a 'special' for the Festival of Britain ran in 1950.

The last line to open was the Saxby to Bourne line, which was part of the Midland & Great Northern project, which subsumed the Bourne & Spalding route. This connection opened in 1894 and was closed to passengers, along with the Spalding line, in 1959.

The original down platform remained outside the Red Hall, after conversion to a through layout, but was no longer used. A hedge was planted along the running line edge to prevent passengers approaching the line. From the Bourne & Spalding period, a single island platform was used by passengers, later reached by an iron lattice footbridge from the disused platform next to the Red Hall. The footbridge was a characteristic Midland Railway design, and is likely to have been provided when the M&GN arrived. All passenger trains used the two faces of the island platform.

With the site redeveloped in the 1970s as a light industrial estate, owned by Lincolnshire County Council, in 2014 Linden Homes started redevelopment of the site, into a residential development, which retains the original station building.

== Summary of former services ==
Preceding station	Disused railways	Following station
Castle Bytham Line and station closed	Midland and Great Northern Joint Railway	Twenty Line and station closed
Thurlby Line and station closed	Great Northern Railway Bourn and Essendine Railway	Terminus
Terminus	Great Northern Railway Bourne and Sleaford Railway	Morton Road Line and station closed

== Sample train timetable for July 1922 ==
The table below shows the train departures from Bourne on weekdays in July 1922.

Departure	Going to	Calling at	Arrival	Operator
07.45	King's Lynn	Twenty, Counter Drain, North Drove, Spalding, Weston, Moulton, Whaplode, Holbeach, Fleet, Gedney, Long Sutton, Sutton Bridge, Walpole, Terrington, Clenchwarton, South Lynn	09.32	M&GN
07.45	Essendine	Thurlby, Braceborough Spa	07.59	GNR
08.55	Leicester	Castle Bytham, South Witham, Edmondthorpe & Wymondham, Saxby, Melton Mowbray, Asfordby, Frisby, Brooksby, Rearsby, Syston	10.38	M&GN
09.05	Sleaford	Morton Road, Rippingale, Billingborough & Horbling, Aswarby & Scredington	09.40	GNR
09.20	Essendine	Thurlby, Braceborough Spa	09.35	GNR
10.48	Sleaford	Morton Road, Rippingale, Billingborough & Horbling, Aswarby & Scredington	11.23	GNR
10.53	King's Lynn	Twenty, Counter Drain, North Drove, Spalding, Weston, Moulton, Whaplode, Holbeach, Fleet, Gedney, Long Sutton, Sutton Bridge, Walpole, Terrington, Clenchwarton, South Lynn	12.50	M&GN
12.10	Lowestoft Central	Sutton Bridge, South Lynn, Melton Constable, Aylsham, North Walsham, Yarmouth Beach, Gorleston-on-Sea, Corton, Lowestoft North. Also through coaches to Norwich and Cromer.	16.16	M&GN
12.15	Leicester	Saxby, Melton Mowbray	13.28	M&GN
12.37	Saxby	Castle Bytham, South Witham, Edmondthorpe & Wymondham	13.19	M&GN
13.00	Essendine	Thurlby, Braceborough Spa	13.15	GNR
14.30	King's Lynn	Twenty, Counter Drain, North Drove, Spalding, Weston, Moulton, Whaplode, Holbeach, Fleet, Gedney, Long Sutton, Sutton Bridge, Walpole, Terrington, Clenchwarton, South Lynn	16.45	M&GN
15.25	Sleaford	Morton Road, Rippingale, Billingborough & Horbling, Aswarby & Scredington	16.00	GNR
15.28	Essendine	Thurlby, Braceborough Spa	15,43	GNR
16.28	Nottingham	Castle Bytham, Saxby, Melton Mowbray	17.41	M&GN
16.40	Lowestoft Central	South Lynn, Fakenham, Melton Constable, Aylsham, North Walsham, Stalham, Potter Heigham, Yarmouth Beach, Gorleston-on-Sea, Lowestoft North. Also through coaches to Norwich and Cromer.	20.24	M&GN
16.50	Spalding	Twenty, Counter Drain, North Drove	17.11	M&GN
16.50	Essendine	Thurlby, Braceborough Spa	17.04	GNR
17.55	Sleaford	Morton Road, Rippingale, Billingborough & Horbling, Aswarby & Scredington	18.30	GNR
18.05	King's Lynn	Twenty, Counter Drain, North Drove, Spalding, Weston, Moulton, Whaplode, Holbeach, Fleet, Gedney, Long Sutton, Sutton Bridge, Walpole, Terrington, Clenchwarton, South Lynn	20.05	M&GN
18.13	Essendine	Thurlby, Braceborough Spa	18.33	GNR
18.15	Leicester	South Witham, Saxby, Syston	19.28	M&GN
18.27	Nottingham	Castle Bytham, South Witham, Edmondthorpe & Wymondham, Saxby, Melton Mowbray	19.30	M&GN
21.07	Spalding	Twenty	21.27	M&GN

== 1873 accident ==
From the Grantham Journal

The return excursion train which was due to leave London at ten minutes before twelve on Saturday night last arrived at Bourne between three and four o'clock on Sunday morning. When near the platform at Bourne station the engine came into violent collision with two empty carriages which were standing upon the line, driving them completely through two very strong gates at the South Street crossing, one of the gates being smashed to splinters, and the carriages considerably damaged. There were nine passengers (including two ladies) in the carriage attached to the engine and we have not heard of anyone sustaining greater injury than a severe shaking. One gentleman's hat was smashed to such an extent that he has put in a claim for a new one.

That would have the accident occurring on Sunday, 30 March 1873.

== Mails ==
An interesting extract from the Stamford Mercury in 1860:

The day delivery of letters in Bourne, which previously took place shortly after 3 o’clock in the afternoon, now commences about 11.30 a m. The train, which heretofore was due at Bourne at 10.58 a m, is now timed so as to reach Bourne at 11.20. By this alteration, a letter posted in London early in the morning may be delivered at Bourne the same day about noon.
