= Thirlby (surname) =

Thirlby is a surname. Notable people with the surname include:

- Jess Thirlby (born 1979), English netball player and coach
- Olivia Thirlby (born 1986), American screen actress
- Rob Thirlby (born 1979), Cornish rugby union footballer
- Thomas Thirlby (c. 1500–1570), English bishop
