= Barholm and Stowe =

Civil parish in Lincolnshire, England

Coordinates: 52.68°N 0.39°W

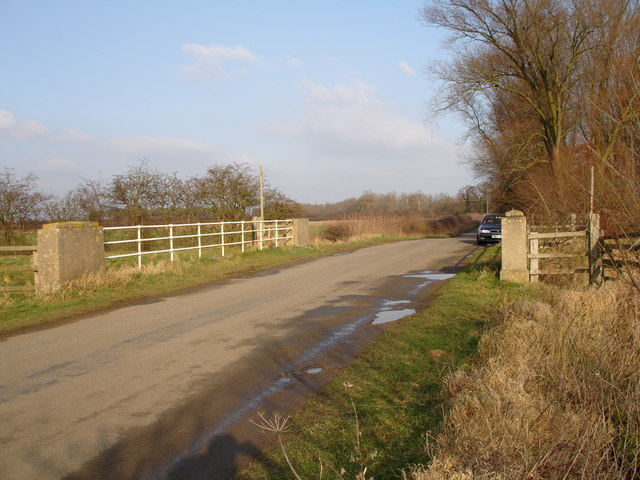
Bridge over the Greatford Cut between Barholm and Stowe

Barholm and Stowe is a civil parish in the South Kesteven district of Lincolnshire, England. According to the 2001 census it had a population of 87 in 34 households, increasing to a population of 139 in 60 households at the 2011 census. The parish covers the village of Barholm and the Stowe hamlet.

== Local government ==
The parish of Barholm and Stowe is part of Casewick ward and does not have a parish council due to the number of residents but has a parish meeting.

Two district councillors represent Casewick Ward on South Kesteven District Council and a county councillor represents Deepings West & Rural Division on Lincolnshire County Council. The district councillors elected in 2023 are Rosemary Trollope-Bellew (Con) and Vanessa Smith (Green). The county councillor elected in 2021 is Ashley Baxter (Ind).
