= Langtoft, Lincolnshire =

Village and civil parish in Lincolnshire, England

Coordinates: 52.699631°N 0.34113°W

Langtoft
- Location within Lincolnshire
- Population: 2,008 (2021)
- OS grid reference: TF122126
  - London: 80 mi (130 km) S
- Civil parish: Langtoft
- District: South Kesteven
- Shire county: Lincolnshire
- Region: East Midlands
- Country: England
- Sovereign state: United Kingdom
- Post town: PETERBOROUGH
- Postcode district: PE6
- Police: Lincolnshire
- Fire: Lincolnshire
- Ambulance: East Midlands
- UK Parliament: Rutland and Stamford

Langtoft is a village and civil parish in the South Kesteven district of Lincolnshire, England. The population of the civil parish at the 2021 census was 2,008. It lies on the A15 road, about 10 miles (16 km) north from Peterborough and about 8 miles (13 km) east from Stamford, and on the edge of The Fens.

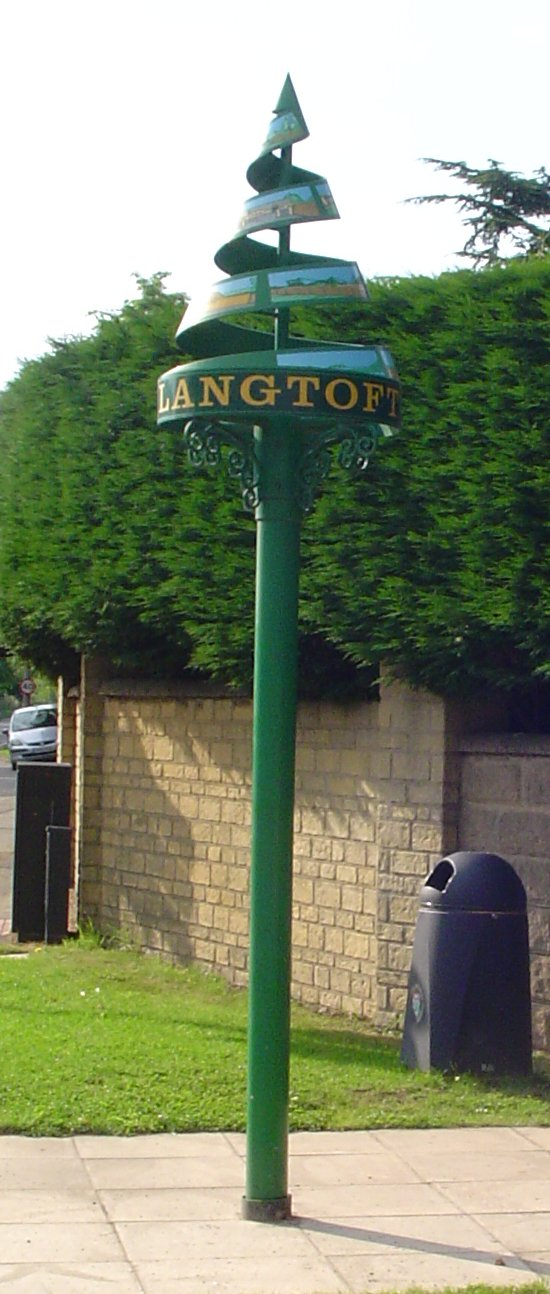
Signpost in Langtoft

Langtoft falls within the drainage area of the Welland and Deepings Internal Drainage Board.

== Community ==
Langtoft has grown in the last 10 years as new housing estates have been built such as that on Aquila Way. The village has a general store-cum-post office, a hairdressers and car salesroom and garage. The Waggon and Horses public house is on the village main road; the original pub was built in the 19th century, burned down in 1888, but was rebuilt.

The village hall holds events, including performances by a local amateur dramatics group and a ladies choir. A new flag pole and clock was added in 2002 at the time of the Queen's Golden Jubilee.

Langtoft Primary School educates about 210 children. The school was founded in 1859, moving to its present site in 1986. Its own wind turbine was installed in 2007. As of 2021 the headteacher is Mr. J McCullough.

== Church ==
Langtoft Grade I listed Anglican parish church is dedicated to St Michael, originating in the 13th century, with additions to the 19th. It is unusual in that it has no stained glass windows; it has undergone considerable restoration work involving new roofs, plumbing and a bell, the work starting in 1994 and finishing in 2004.

Langtoft is an ecclesiastical parish with the same boundaries as the civil parish, and part of the West Elloe Deanery of the Diocese of Lincoln. The parish is part of the Ness group, sharing the same incumbent, the Revd Canon Janet Beadle.

In the church grounds is Langtoft's war memorial to those who fought in the First and Second World Wars, with the inscription: "To the memory of those who fell in the Great War 1914-1918 and World War 1939-1945. Greater love hath no man than this. That he lay down his life for his friends. – John XV".
