= Thurlby, South Kesteven =

Village and civil parish in Lincolnshire, England

Coordinates: 52.738375°N 0.378584°W

Thurlby
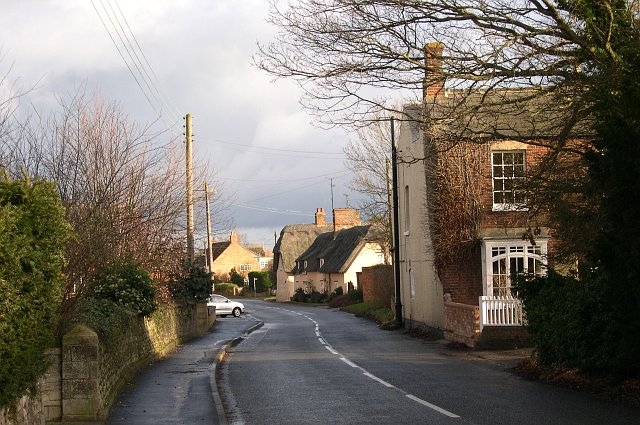
- Thurlby village

- Location within Lincolnshire
- Population: 2,153 (2011)
- OS grid reference: TF095168
  - London: 85 mi (137 km) S
- District: South Kesteven
- Shire county: Lincolnshire
- Region: East Midlands
- Country: England
- Sovereign state: United Kingdom
- Post town: BOURNE
- Postcode district: PE10
- Dialling code: 01778
- Police: Lincolnshire
- Fire: Lincolnshire
- Ambulance: East Midlands
- UK Parliament: Grantham and Bourne

Thurlby is a village and civil parish in the South Kesteven district of Lincolnshire, England. It is situated just west of the A15 road, 2 miles (3 km) south from the town of Bourne, and on the edge of the Lincolnshire Fens. It is sometimes referred to as Thurlby by Bourne to distinguish it from other villages in Lincolnshire with the same name. Thurlby and the hamlet of Northorpe to its north are conjoined. The parish had a population of 2,136 at the 2001 census and 2,153 at the 2011 census.

== History ==
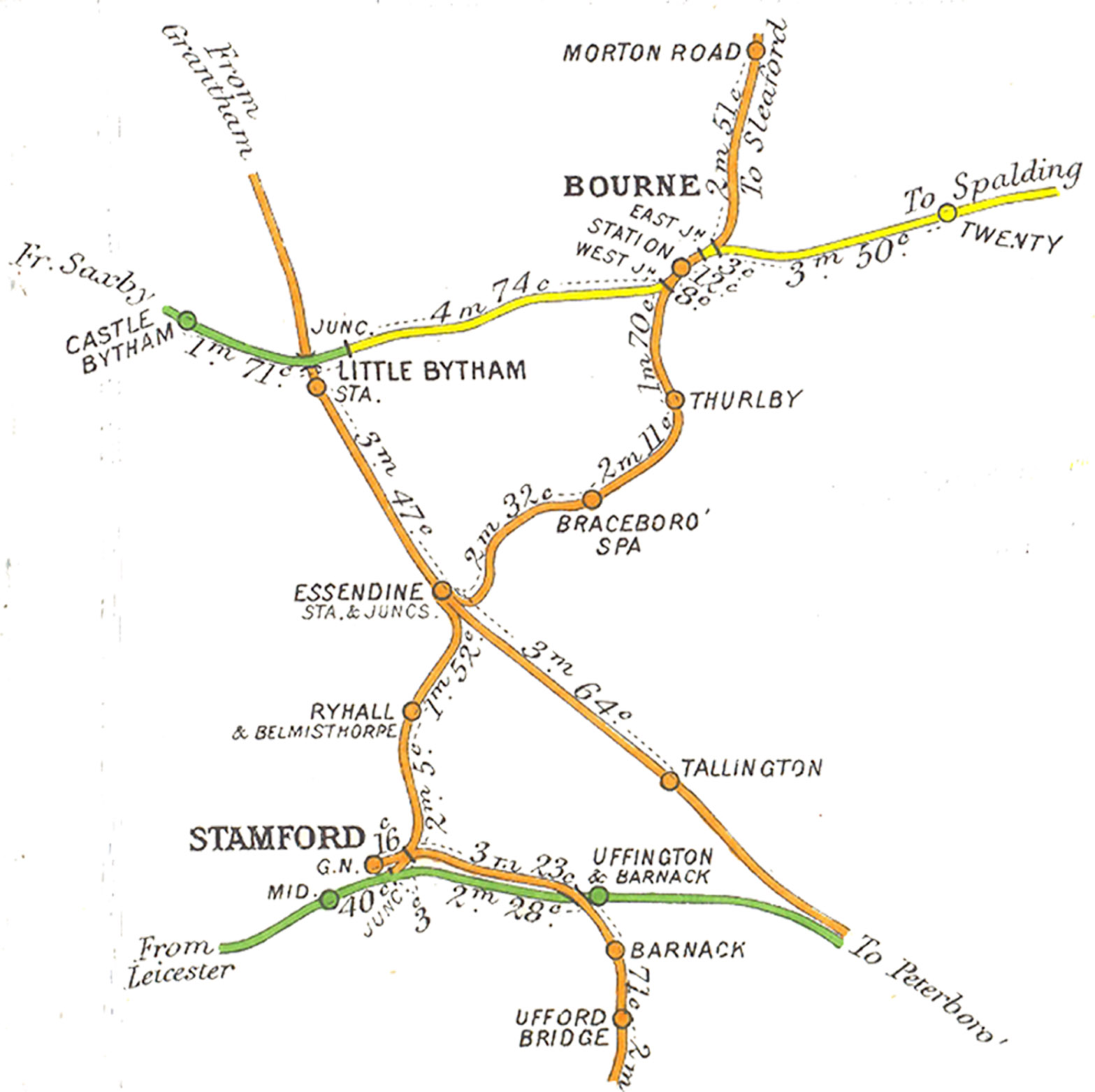
Detail of 1903 Railway Clearing House diagram showing Thurlby railway station

The Roman Car Dyke passes through the parish to the east of the road. The A15 road itself broadly follows the route of the Roman Road King street.

The church of St Firmin dates back to before the Norman Conquest, reportedly to 925 AD. It has features of Saxo-Norman and Perpendicular style.

Thurlby is mentioned in the 1086 Domesday survey as "Tvrolvebi", "Tvrodldbi", "Torulfbi" and "Turoluebi".

A Methodist chapel, Trinity Methodist Church, was established in 1912.

Thurlby railway station was on the Bourn and Essendine Railway; it opened in 1860 and closed in 1951. The railway workers cottages 3 to 9 Station Road, built in 1866 are nearly the oldest properties in the village, they were famously hit by an air bus in the 1920s.

== Geography ==
Geographically Thurlby is on the western edge of The Lincolnshire Fens, and Thurlby Fen, to the east of the A15, falls within the drainage area of the Welland and Deepings Internal Drainage Board.

Thurlby lies between Bourne and Baston. Most of the village lies to the west of the A15 road but a part, including the parish church, is to the east. The parish includes Northorpe, which is continuous with Thurlby, and the outlying hamlets of Obthorpe and Kate's Bridge. The ecclesiastical parish of Thurlby shares the same boundaries as the civil parish.

== Community ==
The ecclesiastical parish, with a single parish church of St Firmin, is part of the Ness group of the Deanery of Aveland and Ness with Stamford.

Major Gonville Bromhead VC was born in the village of Thurlby in August 1845. Bromhead was awarded the Victoria Cross for his actions at the Battle of Rorke's Drift in 1879.

In 1979 local resident Harold Sneath bequeathed his home to the Youth Hostels Association (YHA) to use as youth hostel.

=== Transport ===
The nearest airport to the village is East Midlands Airport, about an hour away by car, in the neighbouring county of Leicestershire, with regular flights across Europe, North Africa and the Middle East. The nearest railway stations are situated at either Stamford and Peterborough, with both hosting regular scheduled services to London King's Cross and Birmingham, and Peterborough additionally connecting to other destinations throughout the UK, such as Norwich, Cambridge, Edinburgh, York, Newcastle, Lincoln, Nottingham and Doncaster.

=== Education ===
The village has a modern primary school sharing a site with the community hall and Lawrance Park. Thurlby Community Primary School usually has around 200 pupils and caters for children aged 4 to 11, with the majority of pupils progressing to either Bourne Grammar School or Bourne Academy. There is a pre-school is situated towards the A15 in Northorpe.

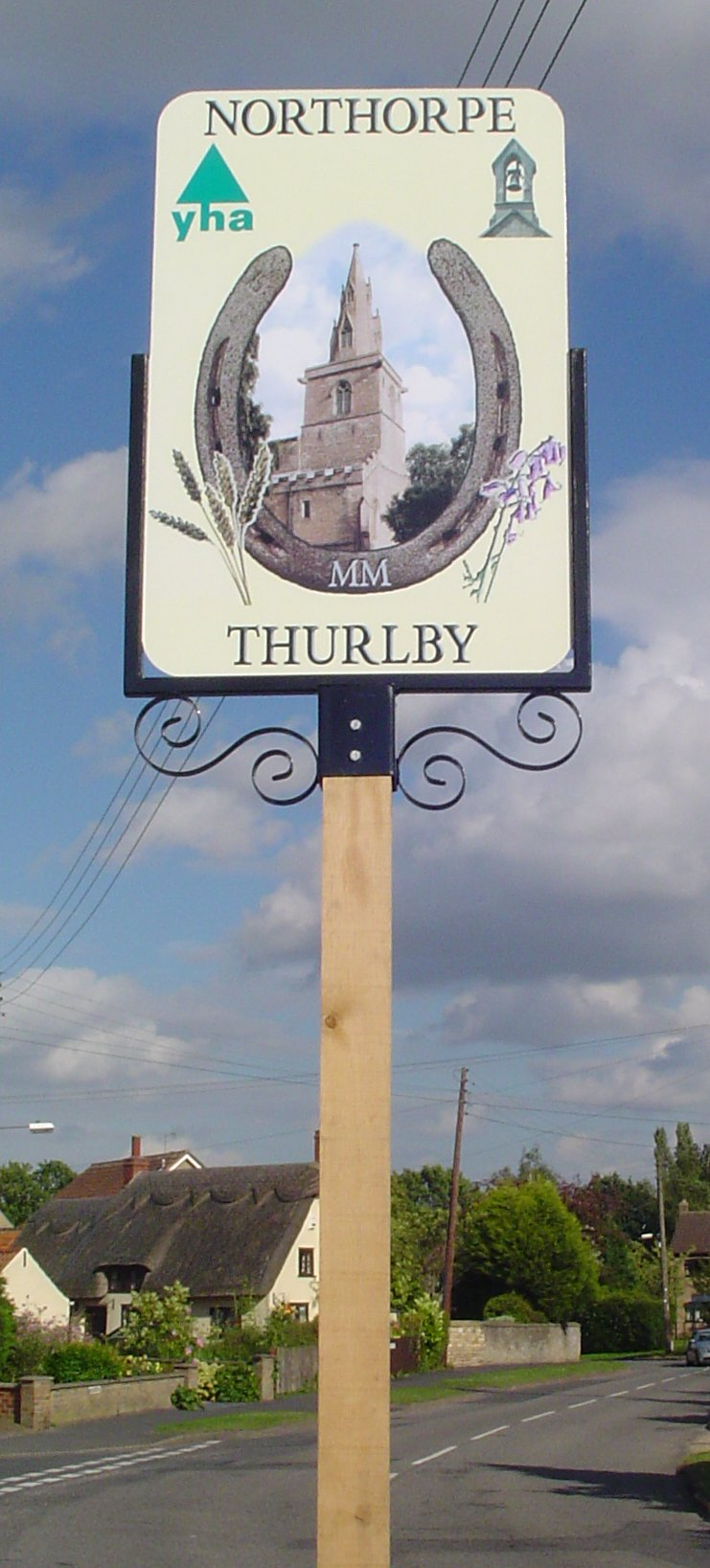
Signpost

=== Northorpe ===
Northorpe is a hamlet situated directly adjacent to the village of Thurlby. Northorpe is near to Elsea and Math Woods, the latter of which is rumoured to be haunted by Nanny Rutt.
