= Bourn and Essendine Railway =

Former railway in Lincolnshire, England

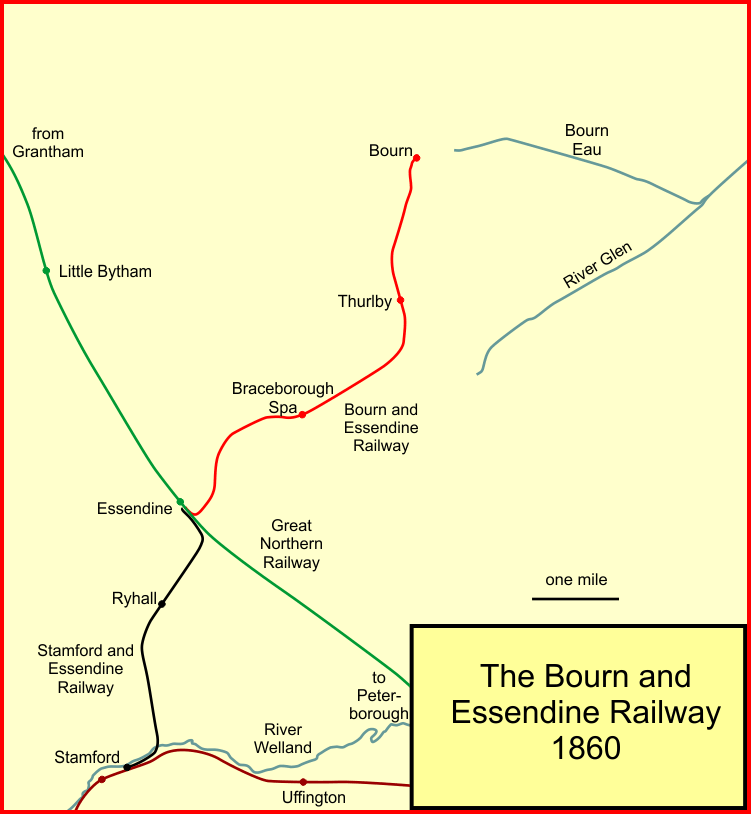
Bourn & essendine

The Bourn and Essendine Railway (the town originally spelt "Bourn" (later Bourne) was a seven mile long branch line which connected Bourne in Lincolnshire to the East Coast Main Line in the village of Essendine in Rutland. The line was opened in 1860; it was a single line and served the town of Bourne and the villages of Thurlby, Braceborough and Essendine. Its line ran through the ceremonial counties of Lincolnshire and Rutland in the East Midlands of England.

There was originally talk of a through-line to connect with the Stamford and Essendine Railway, which was also at Essendine station. Had this have happened, it would have connected Bourne to Stamford at Stamford East station. This never happened and the line from Bourne to Essendine served as a stub. The Bourn and Essendine Railway was the first railway to reach Bourn, which later became an important point for the Bourne and Sleaford Railway, this line and the Midland and Great Northern Joint Railway. GNR acquired the company and its assets in 1864.

The connection at Essendine faced north, and this though never saw much traffic. The line and stations closed in 1951 except for Essedine and Bourne which were still open until 1959 for passengers.

== Promotion ==
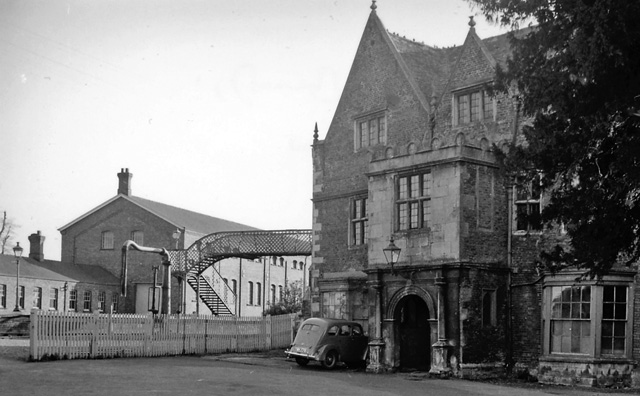
Bourne railway station

The Great Northern Railway opened its main line between Peterborough and Grantham in 1852. Bourne (then spelt Bourn, until 1872) was a significant market town, and influential people in the town saw that a railway connection was important to its continued prosperity. Stamford already had a branch line: the Stamford and Essendine Railway had opened in October 1856. An army general, a clergyman and some tradespeople in the town put together a proposal which went to Parliament as a bill.

Bourn and Essendine Railway Act 1857
- Act of Parliament
- Parliament of the United Kingdom
- Long title: An Act for making a Railway from the Essendine Station of the Great Northern Railway to Bourn in the County of Lincoln; and for other Purposes.
- Citation: 20 & 21 Vict. c. cxii

Dates
- Royal assent: 10 August 1857

Text of statute as originally enacted

The Bourn and Essendine Railway was incorporated by the Bourn and Essendine Railway Act 1857 (20 & 21 Vict. c. cxii) on 12 August 1857 (Note: Wrotteseley; Carter and Grant say 12 August 1857.) with powers to construct a railway from Bourne to the main line station at Essendine. Authorised share capital was £48,000.

There were thoughts that this line and the Stamford and Essendine Railway might together form part of a long-distance railway between the Midlands and the East Coast, but this never developed. Moreover, it had been considered to run through trains between Stamford and Spalding, so that the Bourne line was to cross all of GNR tracks at Essendine, so as to use the Stamford and Essendine Railway platform, on the down side of the main line. The GNR forbade that idea; an alternative put forward by the Bourne directors was to enter Essendine from the south to the S&ER platform, but that would still need to cross all the GNR lines, and it was also ruled out.

== Opening ==
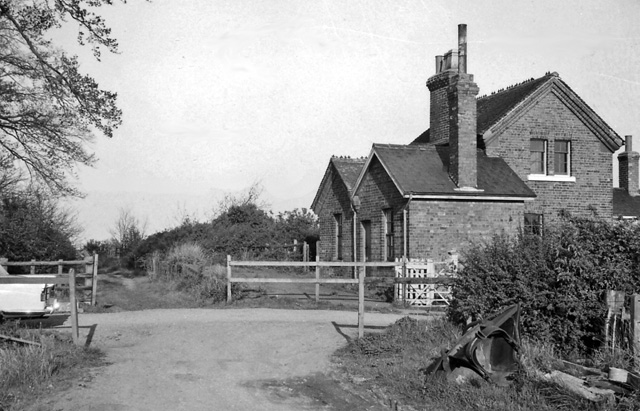
Braceborough Spa Halt

It had been intended to open the line on 1 May 1860, but the Board of Trade inspecting officer's requirements delayed opening until Wednesday 16 May 1860. It was the first railway to reach Bourne: it was worked from the outset by the Great Northern Railway for 50% of receipts. In the first week these amounted to £101, considered to be a good result.

It was a single line; land and bridges were laid out for providing double track later, but this was never done. The Stamford and Essendine Railway already made a junction at Essendine, on the west side of the station, while the Bourne line joined at the east side. Both branches unhelpfully faced north. The line was 6 miles 51 chains in length, and there were two viaducts on the line. The company purchased Old Red Hall, stated to be a fine Elizabethan mansion, at Bourne for use as offices.

Stations were at Braceborough Spa (a platform only, serving a nearby place where healing waters could be taken), Thurlby (which had a small goods yard) and Bourn. There was a siding at Wilsthorpe, east of Braceborough, serving Peterborough Corporation Waterworks. In the mid-1930s a halt was provided at this point on the main road, named Wilsthorpe Crossing Halt. As a turntable had not been installed at Bourn, the line had to be worked by a tank engine.

== Money problems ==
The little company was always in financial difficulty, and the GNR was losing money on the working arrangement. It gave notice in 1863 that it would discontinue working, but it was persuaded to carry on for another year at 60% of the receipts instead of the previous 50%. It became obvious to the directors of the little company that there was no future in independence, and the agreed to sell to the GNR. This took effect on 16 May 1864, authorised by the Great Northern Railway (Lincoln to Bourn) Act 1864 (27 & 28 Vict. c. ccxlii) of 25 July 1864.

== Limited development ==
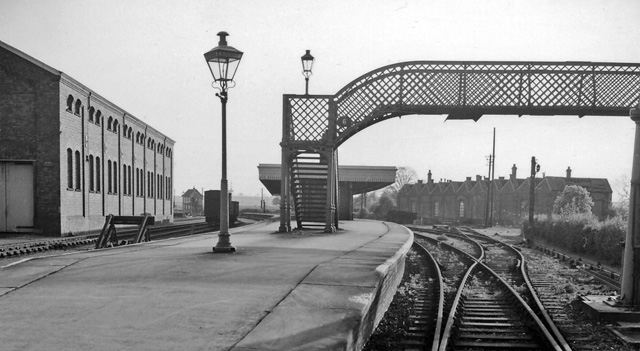
Bourne station

The north-facing connection at Essendine was a constant sticking point, and the GNR obtained powers in the Great Northern Railway (Junctions) Act 1865 (28 & 29 Vict. c. ccxvi) in July 1865 for a southward spur at Essendine to allow direct running to and from the Peterborough direction, but this was never built.

Bourne station developed as the focal point for trains from King's Lynn via Spalding, and from Sleaford, as well as Essendine. At this time there were eight trains each way between Essendine and Bourne. In 1894 the Saxby (Leicestershire) extension from Bourne was opened by the Midland and Great Northern Joint Railway. For most of its life there were eight trains each way with two extra on Thursdays and Saturdays. In 1938 one Down train had no intermediate stops, one Up stopped only at Thurlby. Four stopped only if required at Braceborough Spa, otherwise all stopped at all stations.

From 1927 until closure the branch train was composed of an articulated twin set built out of two coaches from Ivatt steam-motor cars.

== Closure ==
Bourne never became an important enough commercial centre to justify a decent train service making a connection at Essendine, and complete closure of the branch came on 18 June 1951.

== Stations ==
Bourne; opened 16 May 1860; usually spelt Bourn until 1872; closed 2 March 1959; Thurlby; opened 16 May 1860; closed 18 June 1951; Wilsthorpe Crossing; opened 1 December 1933; closed 18 June 1951; Braceborough Spa; opened 16 May 1860; closed 18 June 1951; Essendine; main line station; opened 15 July 1852; closed 15 June 1959.
