= Bourne and Sleaford Railway =

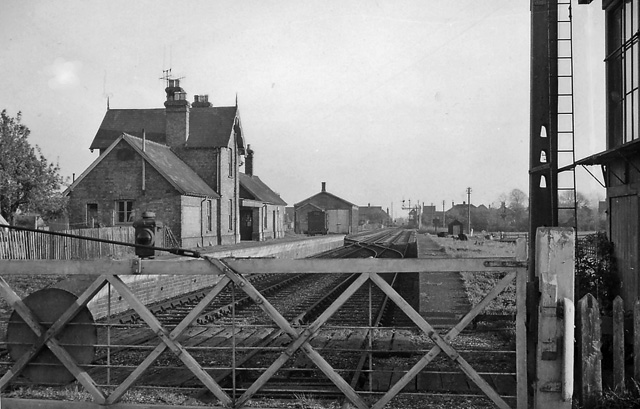
- Billingborough & Horbling station in April 1961

Overview
- Locale: East Midlands, England
- Termini: Bourne; Sleaford
- Stations: 4

Service
- Operator(s): Great Northern Railway

History
- Opened: 1872
- Closed: 1930 (passengers); 1964 (goods)

Technical
- Line length: 18 mi (29 km)
- Number of tracks: 1

The Bourne and Sleaford Railway was promoted as a branch of the Great Northern Railway to fend off an expected incursion by the rival Great Eastern Railway. It was authorised by Parliament in 1865, but not opened until 1871 (part way) and 1872. Although agricultural traffic provided healthy business, the rural character of the line never produced much passenger trade, and it was closed to passengers in 1930. The line was severed and ceased to be a through line in 1956 and closed completely in 1965.

== Origin ==
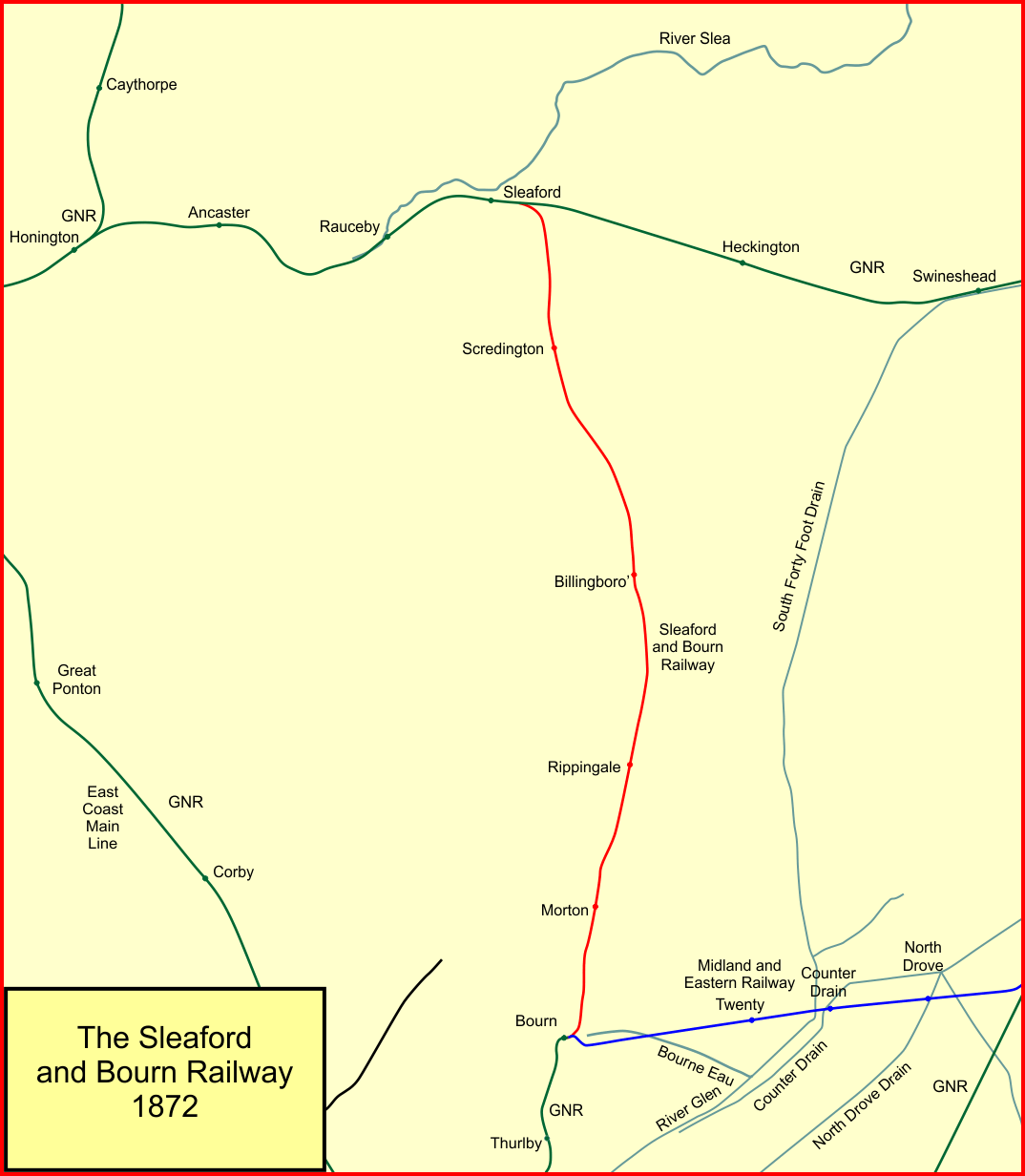
Sleaford and Bourn Railway

In the 1860s the Great Eastern Railway was pressing for powers to build northwards from March, to increase its share of the lucrative transport of Yorkshire and Nottinghamshire coal to the south. In the 1864 session of Parliament the Great Northern Railway presented a bill for a line between Sleaford and Bourn (later spelt Bourne); this was a spoiler to keep the GER out of the area; it was thrown out by Parliament in that session.

Great Northern Railway (Sleaford to Bourn) Act 1865
- Act of Parliament
- Parliament of the United Kingdom
- Long title: An Act to authorize the Great Northern Railway Company to construct a Railway in Lincolnshire from Sleaford to Bourn.
- Citation: 28 & 29 Vict. c. clxxxii

Dates
- Royal assent: 29 June 1865

Text of statute as originally enacted

It was submitted again in the next session, and this time was authorised by Great Northern Railway (Sleaford to Bourn) Act 1865 (28 & 29 Vict. c. clxxxii) of 29 June 1865, with powers to raise £190,000 in share capital.

The Railway by this Act authorized shall be wholly in the Parts of Kesteven in Lincolnshire, commencing in the Parish of Old Sleaford by a Junction with the Boston, Sleaford, and Midland Counties Railway at about a Quarter of a Mile to the Eastward of Sleaford Station, passing through Old Sleaford, New Sleaford, Kirkby-le-Thorpe, Quarrington, Silk Willoughby, Burton Pedwardine, Scredington, Aswarby, Spanby, Swaton, Osbournby, Threekingham, Stowe Green, Horbling, Bridge End, Billingborough, Sempringham, Pointon, Birthorpe, Aslackby, Millthorpe Graby, Dowsby, Rippingale, Dunsby, Hacconby, Stainfield, Morton, Harmsthorpe, Dyke, Cawthorpe, Thurlby, and Bourn, and terminating in the last-named Parish by a Junction with the Bourn and Essendine Line of the Great Northern Railway, near the Sixth Mile Post on the said Bourn and Essendine Line, at the Boundary dividing the Parishes of Bourn and Thurlby. — Section 17, Great Northern Railway (Sleaford to Bourn) Act 1865 (28 & 29 Vict. c. clxxxii)

== Construction – eventually ==
The GNR evidently had second thoughts about the line, for they sought power to abandon the powers in 1868. This was refused by the Board of Trade who required completion by June 1871.

Firbank's tender of £29,363 for construction of the line was accepted on 2 August 1870. The Great Northern Railway Act 1871 (34 & 35 Vict. c. clxii) of 24 July 1871 permitted a slight deviation at Bourn to allow the line to terminate by a junction with the Bourn and Lynn Joint Railway. The railway was built as cheaply as possible. Except for a passing place at Billingborough, it was single track. Commencing by a junction at Sleaford the line ran for 17 miles 12 chains to Bourn junction (later Bourne East junction).

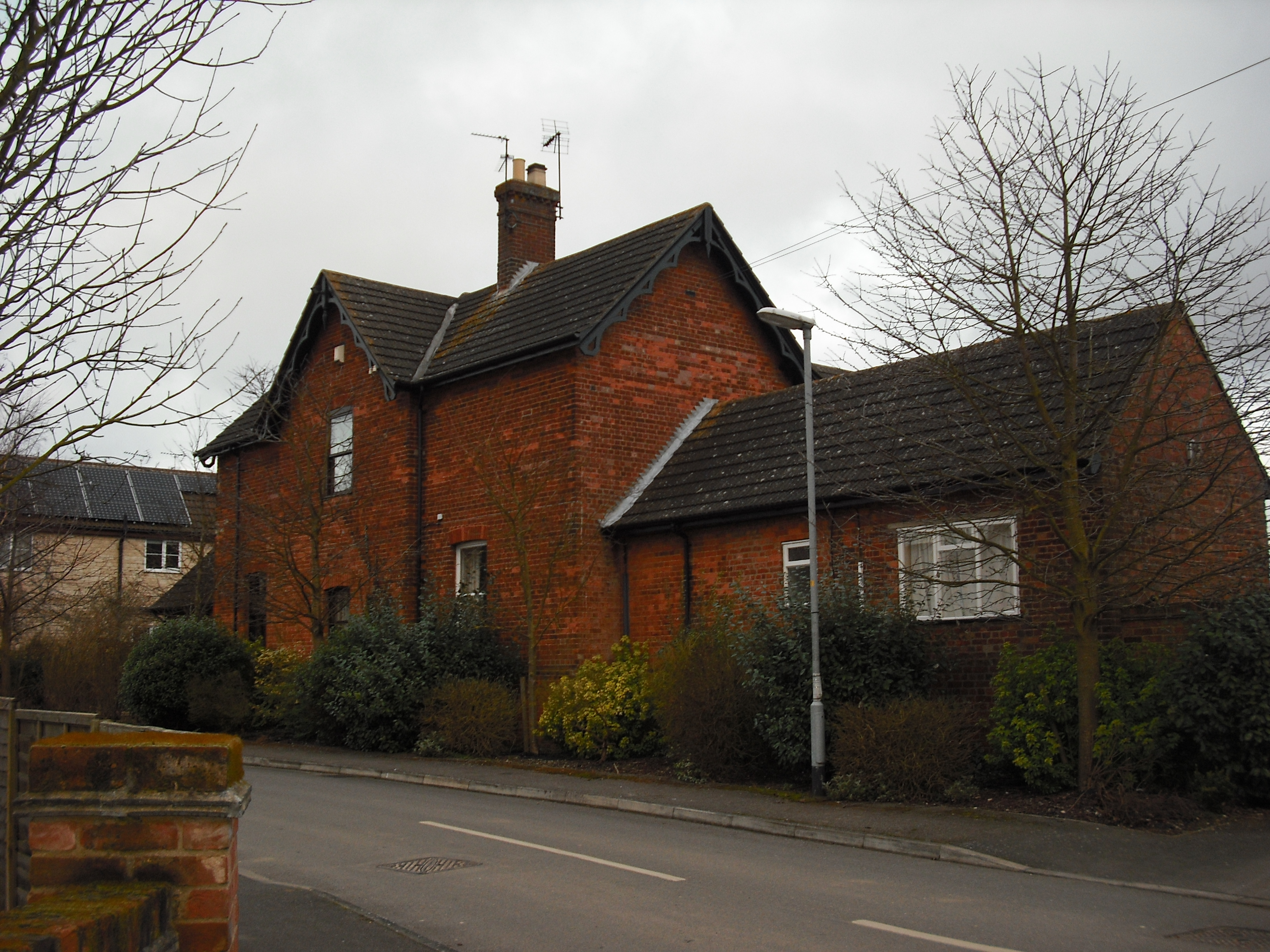
The former station building at Morton Road station

The GNR paid the Midland and Eastern, the actual owners of the Bourn and Lynn section, £25 per annum for use of 143 yards of its line. There was a viaduct with six openings of 22ft 6in. Stations were built by S & W Pattinson for £4,781. Goods and passenger facilities were, north to south, at Burton (goods siding only); Scredington for Aswarby, Billingborough & Horbling for Folkingham, Rippingale, Hacconby (goods siding only: where the board turned down petitions for a station); and Morton. Before sanctioning passenger use, the Board of Trade inspecting officer required that turntables be installed at Bourn and Sleaford by 1 May 1872, and waiting sheds provided on the platforms at Bourn, Billingborough and Sleaford. The total cost was £107,020. Billingborough was the only station with two platforms.

== Opening ==
Goods trains, worked by the contractor's engines, began operating between Sleaford and Billingborough on 10 October 1871 and the line was opened throughout on 2 January 1872. There were six passenger trains each way on weekdays only (one of these on Mondays only) and a daily goods train worked from Grantham to Bourn and back. The journey time for passenger trains on the branch was fifty minutes. Scredington was renamed Aswarby & Scredington on 1 February 1875 and the spelling of "Bourn" station was altered to "Bourne" in the May 1872 timetable.

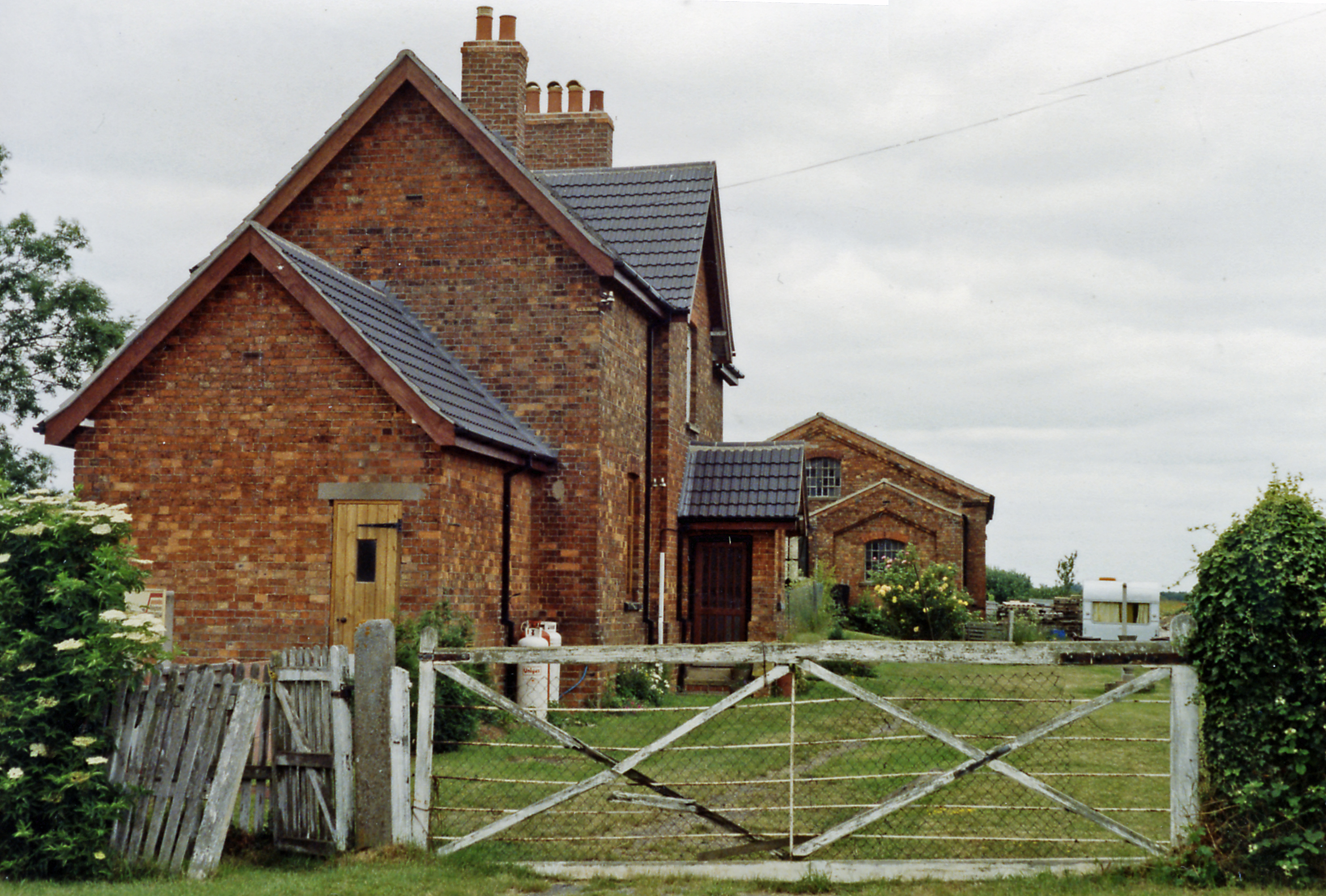
Aswarby & Scredington former station

Complaints were immediately made about timing because the first train from Sleaford did not make a useful onward connection.

== Decline and closure ==
The branch only served rural communities and was never commercially successful, Bus services proved more convenient, and on 22 September 1930 it was closed to passenger trains. After that date there were occasional Sunday Stamford and Bourne to Skegness excursions which called at all stations on the line, but these ceased in 1939. One daily goods train continued to run from Sleaford to Bourne and return. Potatoes and grain provided a worthwhile traffic for some time.

The line between Sleaford and Billingborough closed to all traffic on 28 July 1956, but it was used for some years afterwards for the storage of redundant mineral wagons. The southern end, from Bourne to Billingborough, was cut back to Haconby siding after 15 June 1964, and the line was completely closed on 2 April 1965.

== Stations ==
- Sleaford; opened 15 or 16 June 1857; still open;
- Scredington; opened 2 January 1872; renamed Aswarby and Scredington 1875; closed 22 September 1930;
- Billingborough & Horbling; opened 2 January 1872; closed 22 September 1930;
- Rippingale; opened 2 January 1872; closed 22 September 1930;
- Morton; opened 2 January 1872; renamed Morton Road 1895; closed 22 September 1930;
- Bourn; opened 16 May 1860; usually spelt Bourne from 1893; closed 2 March 1959.
