= Essendine =

Village in Rutland, England

Coordinates: 52.700120°N 0.457225°W

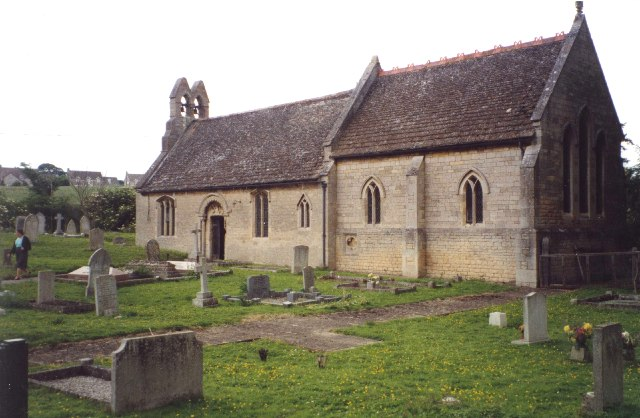
- Church of St Mary Magdalene, Essendine

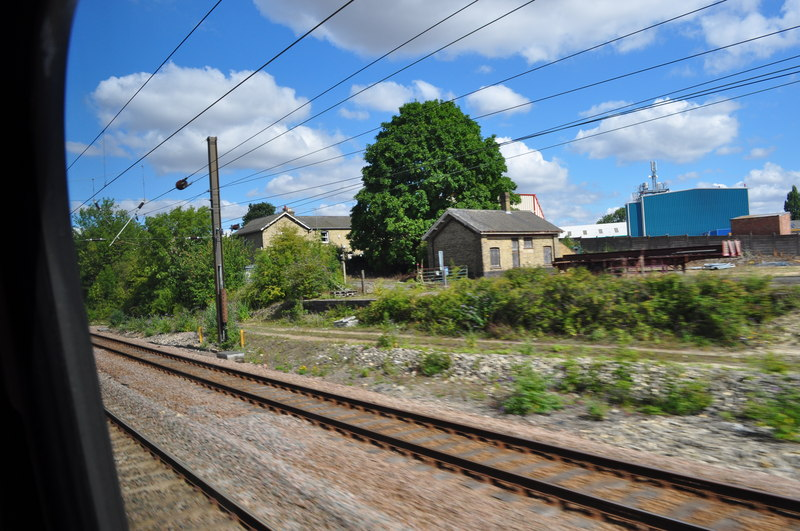
- Former goods yard from a northbound train

- Location within Rutland
- Area: 2.31 sq mi (6.0 km^{2})
- Population: 448 (2011 Census)
  - Density: 159/sq mi (61/km^{2})
- OS grid reference: TF043124
  - London: 84 miles (135 km) SSE
- Unitary authority: Rutland
- Ceremonial county: Rutland
- Region: East Midlands
- Country: England
- Sovereign state: United Kingdom
- Post town: STAMFORD
- Postcode district: PE9
- Dialling code: 01780
- Police: Leicestershire
- Fire: Leicestershire
- Ambulance: East Midlands
- UK Parliament: Rutland and Stamford

Essendine is a village and civil parish at the eastern end of the county of Rutland in the East Midlands of England, located 5 miles (8.0 km) north of Stamford and 6 miles (9.7 km) south of Bourne. The population of the civil parish at the 2011 census was 448. It lies on the West Glen, close by the earthworks of a small castle.

The village's name means 'valley of Esa'.

== Geology ==
Most of the village is on Blisworth Limestone or Upper Estuarine Series geology, though the church and castle are on river alluvium. In the parish generally, the soils are shallow and well drained with limestone brash. There is some clay which is naturally rather poorly drained and occasionally waterlogged. It produces the wheat, barley, sugar beet and some potatoes usual in eastern England

== Buildings ==
The small Church of St Mary Magdalene has a notable Norman tympanum over its south door. It is built within the remains of the castle, which appears to have been a very early Norman bailey later developing into a strongly fortified manor.

The village is dominated by a large industrial site, once the factory of Allis-Chalmers, later Fiatallis. After closure various buildings were rented to a variety of small enterprises, and there are a large number of small businesses to be found to this day. Controversially two substantial fires occurred there in a short time.

== The railway ==
Essendine railway station was on the East Coast Main Line. The railway line and station opened in 1852 and the station closed in 1966.

The station also became the main line terminus of the short Stamford to Essendine line (via Belmesthorpe) which opened in 1856. The Bourn and Essendine Railway (old spelling) opened on 16 May 1860.

On 3 July 1938, north of Essendine and just over the border in Lincolnshire at Milepost 90¼, LNER Class A4 locomotive Mallard set the land speed record for a steam locomotive, reaching 126 miles per hour (203 km/h), unbeaten to this day. A commemorative sign was erected by the track near the milepost in 1998.
