= Ufford Bridge railway station =

Former railway station in Cambridgeshire, England

Coordinates: 52.6226°N 0.3989°W

Ufford Bridge
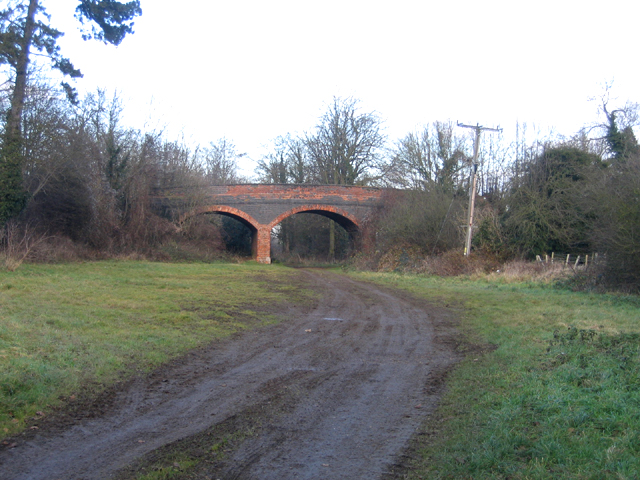
- Former site of Ufford Bridge railway station.

General information
- Location: Ufford, City of Peterborough; England
- Grid reference: TF085040
- Platforms: 1

Other information
- Status: Disused

History
- Pre-grouping: Great Northern Railway
- Post-grouping: London and North Eastern Railway

Key dates
- 1867: Opened
- 1929: Closed
Location

Ufford Bridge railway station was a station serving the villages of Ufford and Southorpe in the Soke of Peterborough (now part of Cambridgeshire). The station was situated where the road from Ufford crosses the railway, at the point where it meets the Barnack to Southorpe road.

The platform was under and to the north of the bridge and the goods siding to the south. A waiting room was built utilising the road bridge as its roof. The train guard combined the duties of station master, porter, booking clerk and ticket collector at Ufford Bridge.

The station was on the Stamford and Essendine Railway line from Stamford to Wansford line which never really recovered from the 1926 general strike, and the station closed with the line on 1 July 1929.

Former Services

Preceding station	Disused railways	Following station
Barnack	Great Northern Railway; Stamford and Essendine Railway	Wansford Road
