= Sibson railway station =

Short-lived railway station in Sibson, Cambridgeshire

Sibson

General information
- Location: Sibson, City of Peterborough; England
- Coordinates: 52.5696°N 0.38°W
- Grid reference: TL098980

Other information
- Status: Disused

History
- Original company: Stamford and Essendine Railway
- Pre-grouping: Stamford and Essendine Railway

Key dates
- 1 January 1870: Opened
- 1 March 1878: Closed
Location

Sibson railway station served the village of Sibson, in the historic area of Soke of Peterborough, England, from 1870 to 1878 on the Stamford and Essendine Railway.

== History ==
The station was opened on 1 January 1870 by the Stamford and Essendine Railway. It was a temporary terminus while the junction with Wansford was closed. The station closed when the junction reopened on 1 March 1878.

Preceding station	Disused railways	Following station
Wansford Road; Line and station closed	Stamford and Essendine Railway	Terminus
