= Ryhall railway station =

Former railway station in Rutland, England

Coordinates: 52.6791°N 0.4617°W

Ryhall & Belmesthorpe
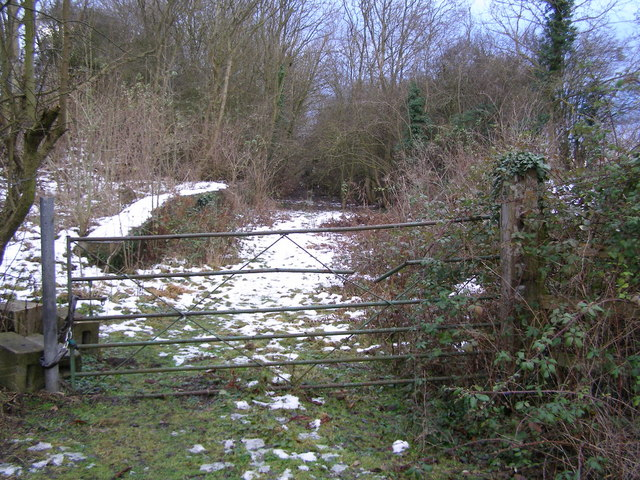

General information
- Location: Belmesthorpe, Rutland; England
- Grid reference: TF041102
- Platforms: 1

Other information
- Status: Disused

History
- Original company: Stamford & Essendine
- Pre-grouping: Great Northern Railway
- Post-grouping: London and North Eastern Railway; Eastern Region of British Railways

Key dates
- 1 November 1856: Opened
- 15 June 1959: Closed
Location

The location of Ryhall Station, which served the villages of Ryhall and Belmesthorpe from 1856 to 1959.

Ryhall & Belmesthorpe railway station (originally Ryhall & Belmisthorpe) was a station in Belmesthorpe and about half a mile from Ryhall, both in Rutland. It was the only intermediate station on the Stamford and Essendine Railway, later Great Northern Railway, single track line between Stamford and Essendine. It was sited south of a level crossing at the west end of the village. The goods yard was to the north of the level crossing.

Former Services

Preceding station	Disused railways	Following station
Stamford East	Great Northern Railway Stamford and Essendine Railway	Essendine
