= Stamford East railway station =

Former railway station in Lincolnshire, England

Stamford East
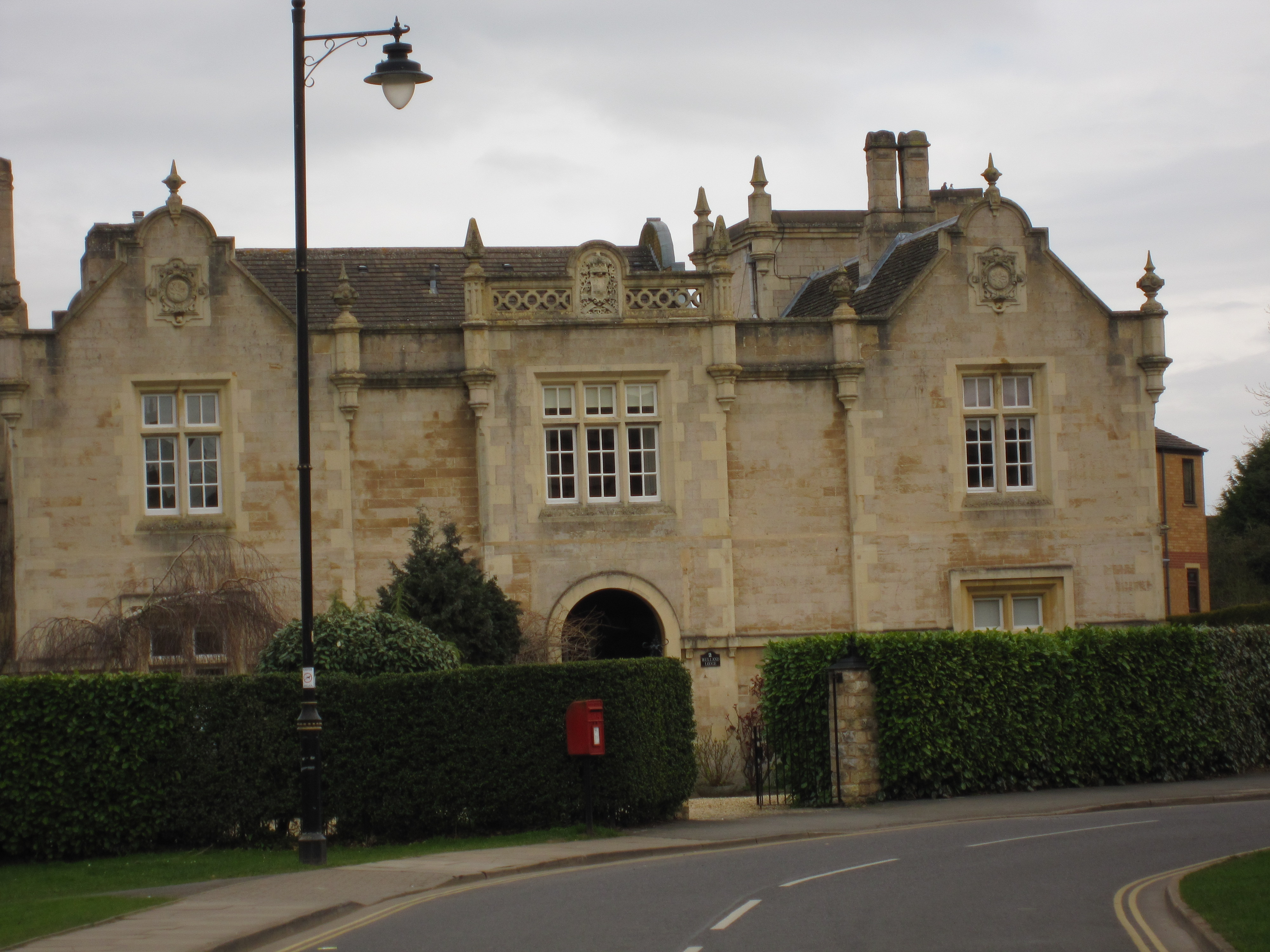
- Frontage of former station now a private house

General information
- Location: Stamford, Lincolnshire; England
- Coordinates: 52.65018°N 0.47226°W
- Grid reference: TF035067
- Platforms: 2

Other information
- Status: Disused

History
- Pre-grouping: Great Northern Railway
- Post-grouping: London and North Eastern Railway

Key dates
- 1856: Opened
- 1957: Closed
Location

Stamford East railway station was the Stamford and Essendine Railway station in Water Street, Stamford, Lincolnshire. The line was worked by the Great Northern Railway but retained its independence until 1886, when the GNR took the line on perpetual lease.

== Opening ==
The station was opened in 1856 as the terminus of the line to Essendine on the Great Northern Railway main line. The line was mainly intended for passengers travelling north, however through bookings were possible to Peterborough in direct competition with the Midland Railway.

In 1867, the S&ER opened a line to Wansford on the London and North Western Railway Nene Valley line from Northampton to Peterborough. The Wansford line ran east immediately adjacent to, on the north side, of the Midland line for over 2 miles, before gaining height and crossing over the Midland and curving south just before Uffington & Barnack station. This section is now part of the Torpel Way public footpath.

The Essendine line was built single track with provision for double tracking, and at one time it was double tracked, but the signalling arrangements did not meet with Board of Trade approval. Rather than make the necessary alterations, it was single tracked again except for the section between Stamford East and the Martin's Cultivators works. This section was left as two tracks but was operated as two single track lines, with one a running line and the other an industrial siding. This siding, known as Priory Siding, also served Priory Lime Works and the Blackstone & Company Limited works.

== Services ==
In 1863, the service consisted of eleven trains each way between Stamford and Essendine on weekdays, and two on Sundays. In 1910 the service was fifteen each way on the Essendine branch, seven to Wansford, and eight return, with one extra on Fridays, but no Sunday services, and by 1922, this was reduced to ten each way on weekdays on the Essendine line and four on the Wansford line.

== Through freight ==
The Midland Railway was granted running powers over the Stamford and Essendine in 1866 and used it to send goods traffic to the Eastern & Midland Railway at Bourne and thence to East Anglia, but the junction arrangements at Essendine, where a reversal and flat crossing of the GNR main line were required, meant that as traffic increased, the route via Peterborough and the Great Eastern became preferred. To regain traffic, the Eastern & Midland obtained powers in 1888 for a direct line from Bourne to the Midland Railway station at Saxby, near Melton Mowbray, and when this opened, most of the remaining east–west goods traffic was rerouted via the new line.

== Closure ==
The Wansford service never regained the traffic lost during the general strike, and closed to passengers in 1929. Ordnance Survey maps of 1946 show the line as in situ, but disused, from Stamford to half a mile north of Wansford Road station. The Essendine service survived until 1959, but East station closed to passengers two years earlier in 1957 when services were diverted to the Midland Railway station.

East station continued in use for a few years as a goods station, and Priory Siding survived into the 1970s although truncated to the Blackstone & Company Limited works. The site was developed for housing. The former goods shed of circa 1856, east-south-east of the station, is a Grade II listed building.

== Stationmasters ==
From 1936, Stamford East was managed by the station master at Stamford Midland Station.

- J.W. Howe ca. 1856
- Henry Edwards ca. 1863 - 1873
- Robert Linfoot 1873 - 1878 (formerly station master at Little Bytham)
- S. Chesterton 1878 - ca. 1880
- Matthew Brown until 1882
- W. Easterfield 1882 - 1885 (formerly station master at Newark North Gate)
- Thomas Blunt 1885 - 1895 (formerly station master at Spalding)
- John Cooke 1895 - 1904 (formerly station master at Louth)
- John George 1905 - 1922
- H. Spencer until 1925
- Herbert Edward Cullen 1925 - 1936 (formerly station master at Ramsey)
- W.T. Dickens 1936 - 1940 (also station master at Stamford)
- Joseph Henry Marshall until 1946
- John E. Pridmore 1946 - 1957

== Summary of former train services ==
Preceding station	Disused railways	Following station
Ryhall	Great Northern Railway Stamford and Essendine Railway	Barnack

== Sample train timetable for July 1922 ==
The table below shows the train departures from Stamford East on weekdays in July 1922.

Departure	Going to	Calling at	Arrival	Operator
06.15	Essendine	Ryhall	06.24	GNR
07.42	Wansford	Barnack, Ufford Bridge, Wansford Road	08.05	GNR
07.45	Essendine	Ryhall	07.54	GNR
08.35	Essendine	Ryhall	08.44	GNR
09.30	Essendine	Ryhall	09.39	GNR
10.25	Wansford	Barnack, Ufford Bridge, Wansford Road	10.48	GNR
10.50	Essendine	Ryhall	10.59	GNR
13.05	Essendine	Ryhall	13.14	GNR
13.45	Essendine	Ryhall	13.54	GNR
15.20	Wansford	Barnack, Ufford Bridge, Wansford Road	15.45	GNR
15.32	Essendine	Ryhall	15.41	GNR
17.00	Essendine	Ryhall	17.09	GNR
17.40	Wansford	Barnack, Ufford Bridge, Wansford Road	18.05	GNR
18.30	Essendine	Ryhall	18.39	GNR

== Gallery ==
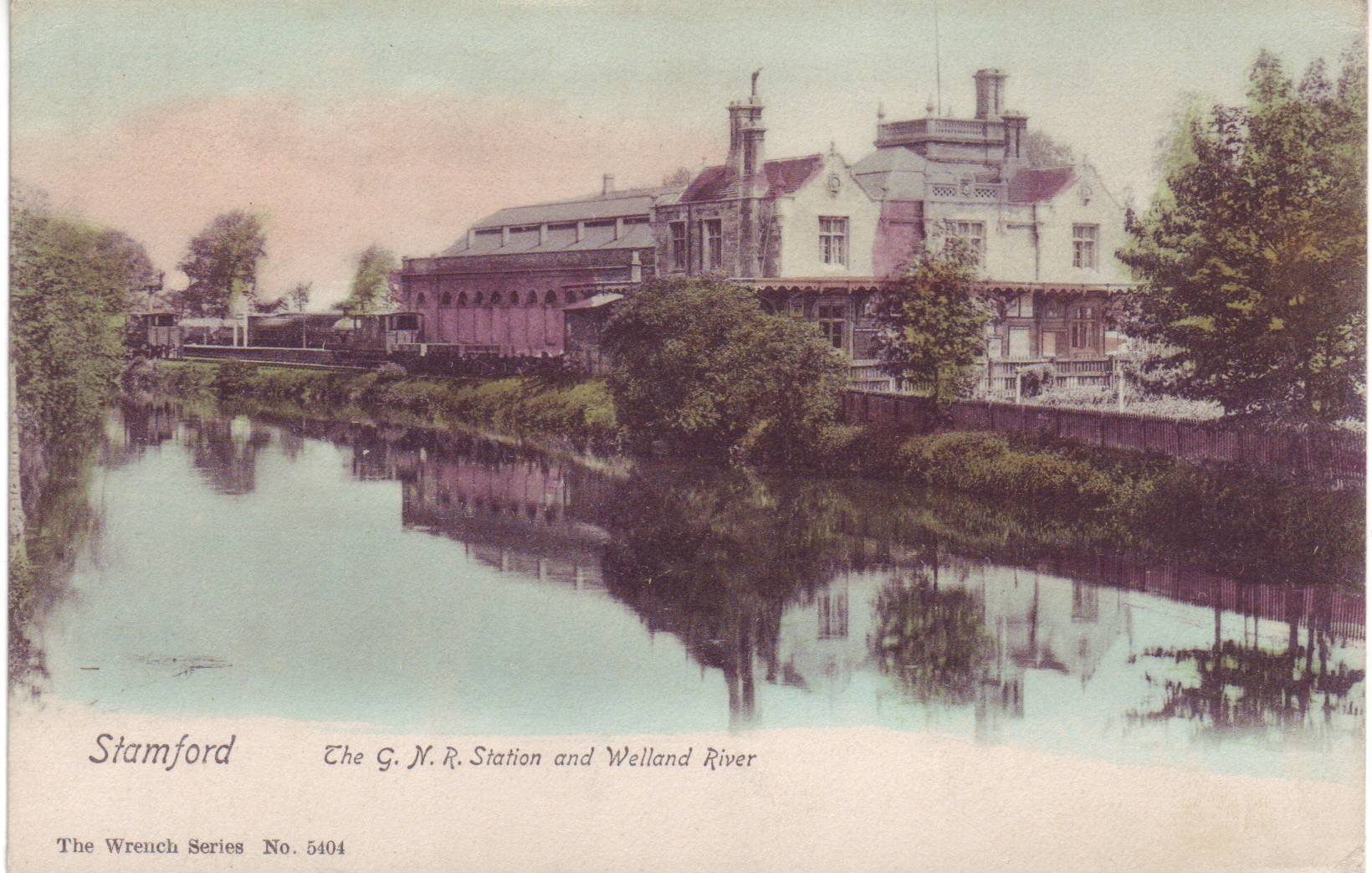
Stamford East railway station, Stamford, Lincolnshire

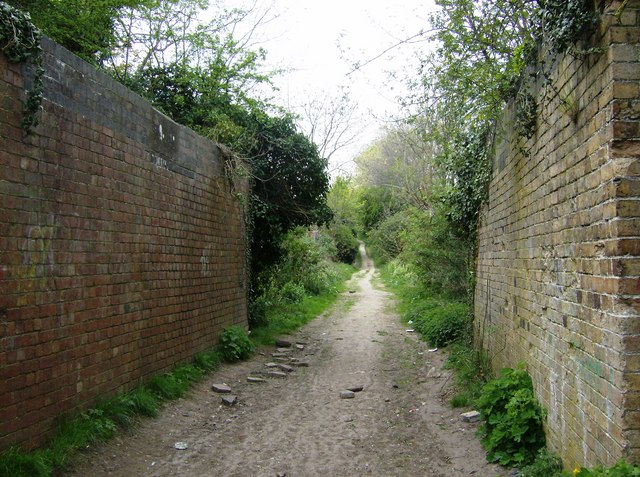
Old railway bridge approaching Stamford

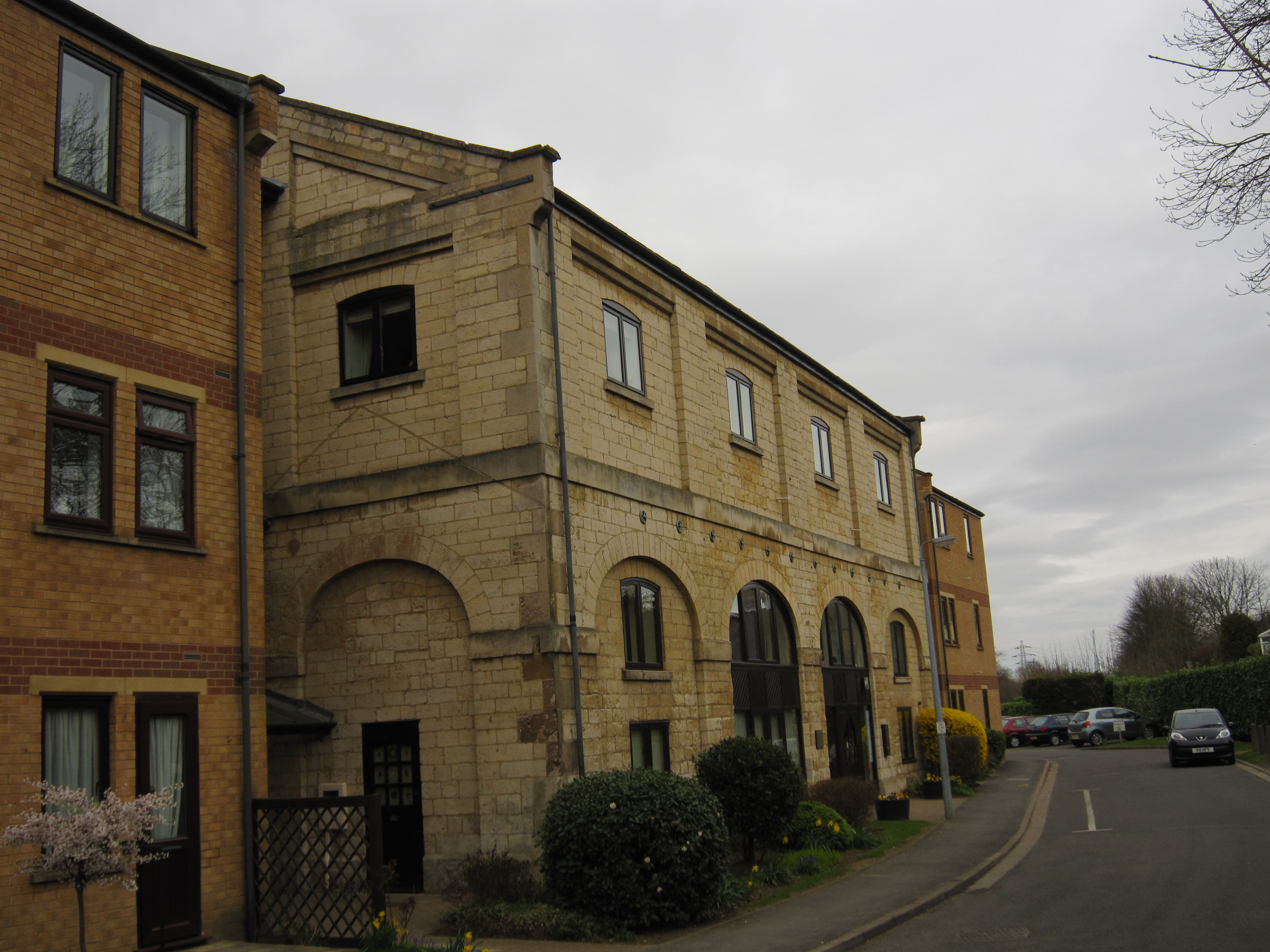
Former Goods Shed
