= Barnack railway station =

Disused railway station in Barnack, Peterborough

Barnack
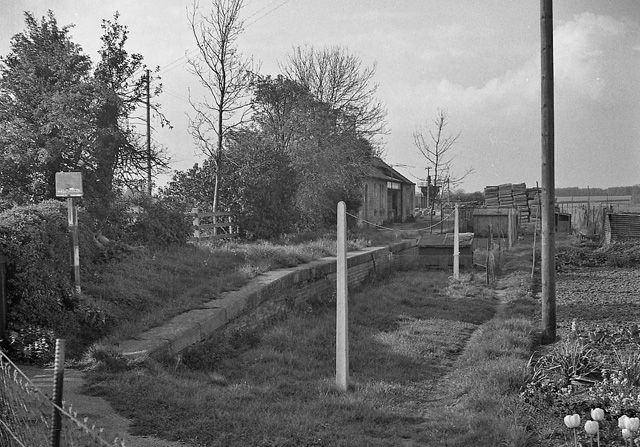
- The station in 1961

General information
- Location: Barnack, City of Peterborough; England
- Coordinates: 52.6347°N 0.4011°W
- Grid reference: TF083053
- Platforms: 1

Other information
- Status: Disused

History
- Original company: Stamford and Essendine Railway
- Pre-grouping: Great Northern Railway
- Post-grouping: London and North Eastern Railway

Key dates
- 9 August 1867: Opened
- 1 July 1929: Closed
Location

Barnack railway station was a station in the Soke of Peterborough (now Cambridgeshire) serving the village of Barnack. Despite being located adjacent to the village, the more remote Uffington & Barnack station on the Midland Railway Leicester to Peterborough line was more convenient for many journeys. Barnack station was opened by the Stamford and Essendine Railway (S&ER) on 9 August 1867; it was on the S&ER's branch from Stamford to Wansford. The S&ER was leased to the Great Northern Railway at the end of 1892. The line never really recovered from the 1926 general strike, and the station closed with the line on 1 July 1929. In 2014 the building survives as a private house.

Preceding station	Disused railways	Following station
Stamford East; Line and station closed	Great Northern Railway; Stamford and Essendine Railway	Ufford Bridge; Line and station closed
