= Wansford Pasture =

Nature reserve in Cambridgeshire, England

Coordinates: 52.582°N 0.424°W

- Site of Special Scientific Interest
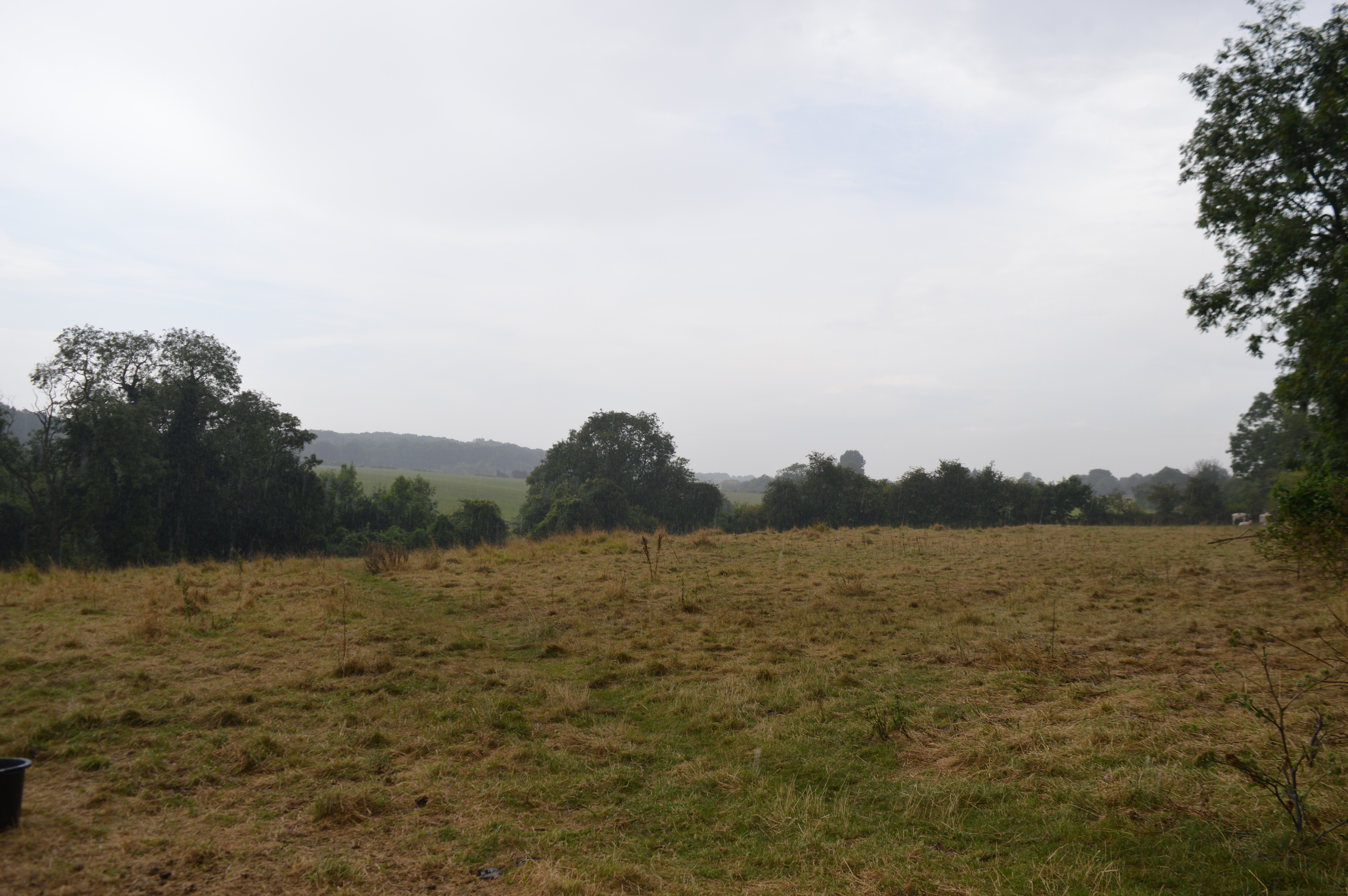
- Location of Wansford Pasture.
- Area of search: Cambridgeshire
- Grid reference: TL 069 994
- Interest: Biological
- Area: 3.1 hectares
- Notification date: 1985
- Location map: Magic Map

Wansford Pasture is a 3.1-hectare (7.7-acre) biological Site of Special Scientific Interest in Wansford in Cambridgeshire. It is part of the 7.3 hectare Wansford Pasture & Standen's Pasture, a nature reserve managed by the Wildlife Trust for Bedfordshire, Cambridgeshire and Northamptonshire (WTBCN).

This is a south-facing slope, with Jurassic limestone grassland and a flush lower down which has a wide variety of wet-loving plants, including some which are rare in the county. The ecology is maintained by avoiding the use of fertilisers and herbicides, and by grazing. The WTBCN was enlarged by the donation of Standen's Pasture in 2007.

There is access to the site from Old Leicester Road.
