= Barnack Hills & Holes National Nature Reserve =

Nature reserve in Cambridgeshire, England

Coordinates: 52.629°N 0.412°W

Barnack Hills & Holes
- Site of Special Scientific Interest
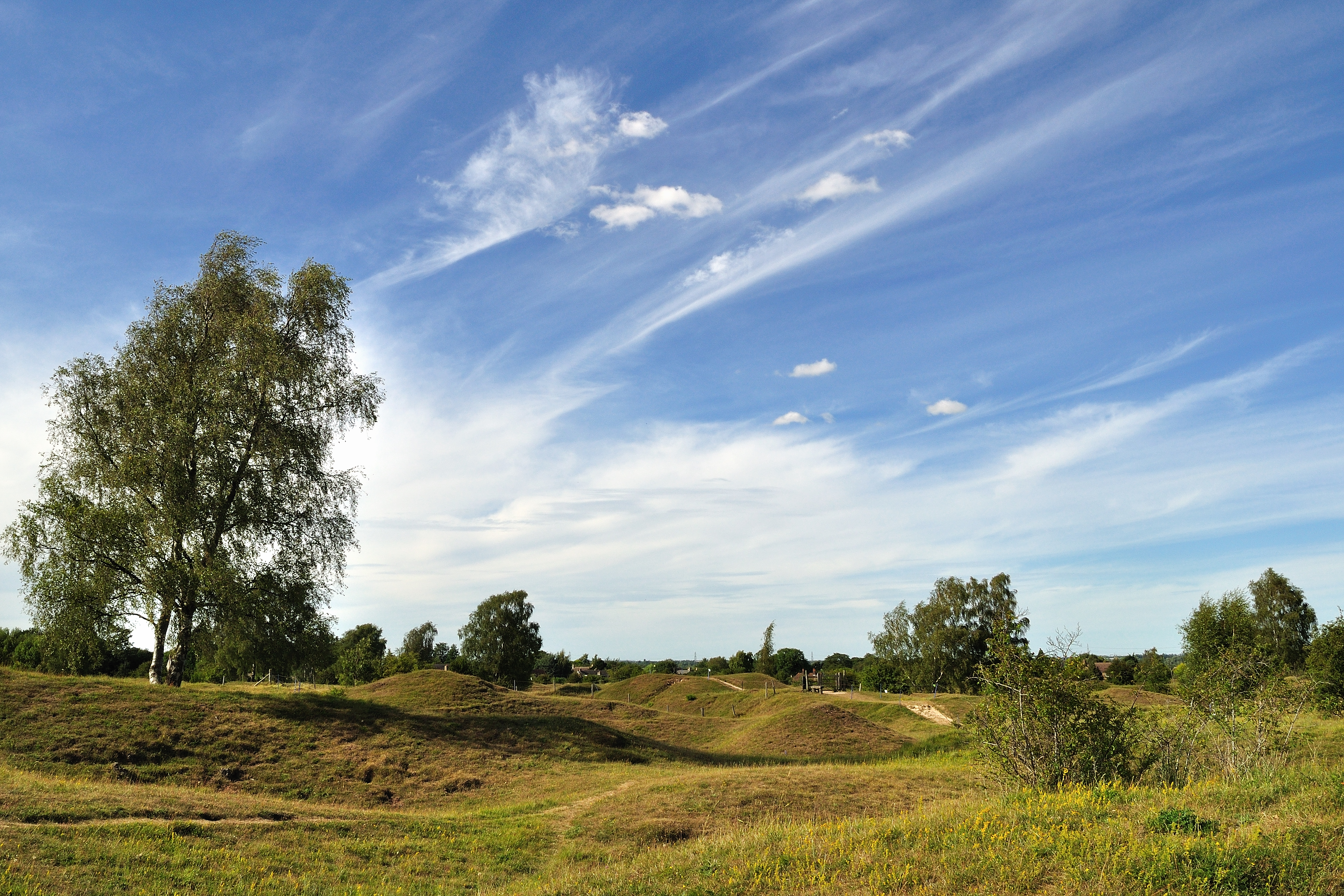
- Location of Barnack Hills & Holes.
- Area of search: Cambridgeshire
- Grid reference: TF 075 046
- Interest: Biological
- Area: 23.3 hectares
- Notification date: 1986
- Location map: Magic Map

Barnack Hills & Holes is a 23.3-hectare (58-acre) biological Site of Special Scientific Interest in Barnack in Cambridgeshire. It is also a national nature reserve. It is a Nature Conservation Review site, Grade I. In 2002 it was designated as a Special Area of Conservation, to protect the orchid-rich grassland as part of the Natura 2000 network of sites throughout the European Union.

Arising from the rubble of a medieval quarry, the Hills and Holes is one of Britain’s most important wildlife sites. Covering an area of just 50 acres (22 ha), the grassy slopes are home to a profusion of wild flowers. This type of meadowland is now all too rare; half of the surviving limestone grassland in Cambridgeshire is found here. In 2002 it was designated as a Special Area of Conservation, to protect the orchid-rich grassland as part of the Natura 2000 network of sites throughout the European Union.

The hummocky landscape was created by quarrying for limestone. Barnack stone, was a valuable building stone first exploited by the Romans over 1,500 years ago. Stone from Barnack was used to build Peterborough and Ely Cathedrals. By the year 1500 however, all the useful stone had been removed and the bare heaps of limestone rubble gradually became covered by the rich carpet of wild flowers that can be seen today. The limestone was originally formed in Jurassic times. It is made from the remains of billions of tiny sea-creatures which lived in a warm shallow sea that covered the area 150 million years ago.

Barnack’s rich flora supports a wide variety of wildlife, especially insects, and a number of nationally scarce species are found. Limestone grasslands are traditionally grazed with sheep and at Barnack, grazing is carried out in autumn by up to 300 sheep. These remove the summer growth and build-up of leaves, stalks and grass tussocks that would otherwise die back to form a dead layer, or litter, on the ground. Without grazing, the build-up of coarse grasses and litter would rapidly choke the rarer lime-loving plants.
