= Wansford Tunnel =

Railway tunnel in Cambridgeshire, England

Coordinates: 52°33′55.62″N 0°23′59.99″W

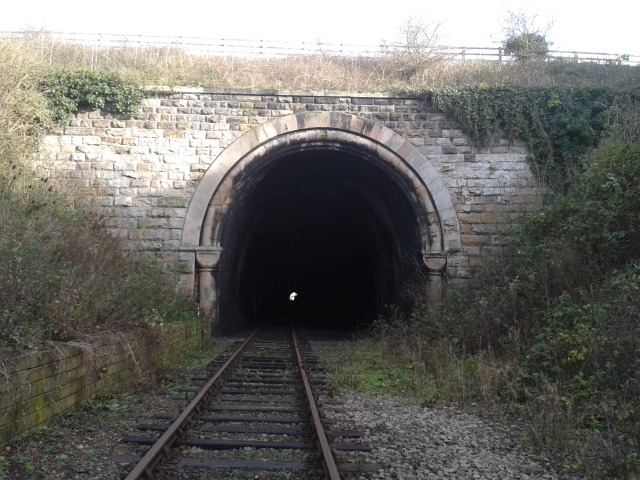
The western portal of Wansford tunnel

Wansford Tunnel is a railway tunnel on the preserved Nene Valley Railway in Cambridgeshire. The tunnel is situated to the south of the village of Wansford, but just to the west of Wansford railway station.

It was on the Blisworth to Peterborough line, opened in 1845 by the London and Birmingham Railway. The line was originally double track, however in the present day only a single track runs through the full length of the tunnel. A siding is partially contained within the tunnel, entering at the eastern end. The tunnel is 616 yards long and has no ventilation shafts.

Just to the west of the tunnel the NVR has opened a new station, Yarwell Junction railway station, which opened to the public in 2007.

The hamlet of Sibson lies atop the hill through which the tunnel is bored.
