= Wansford Road railway station =

Former railway station in Northamptonshire, England

Coordinates: 52.5836°N 0.3934°W

Wansford Road
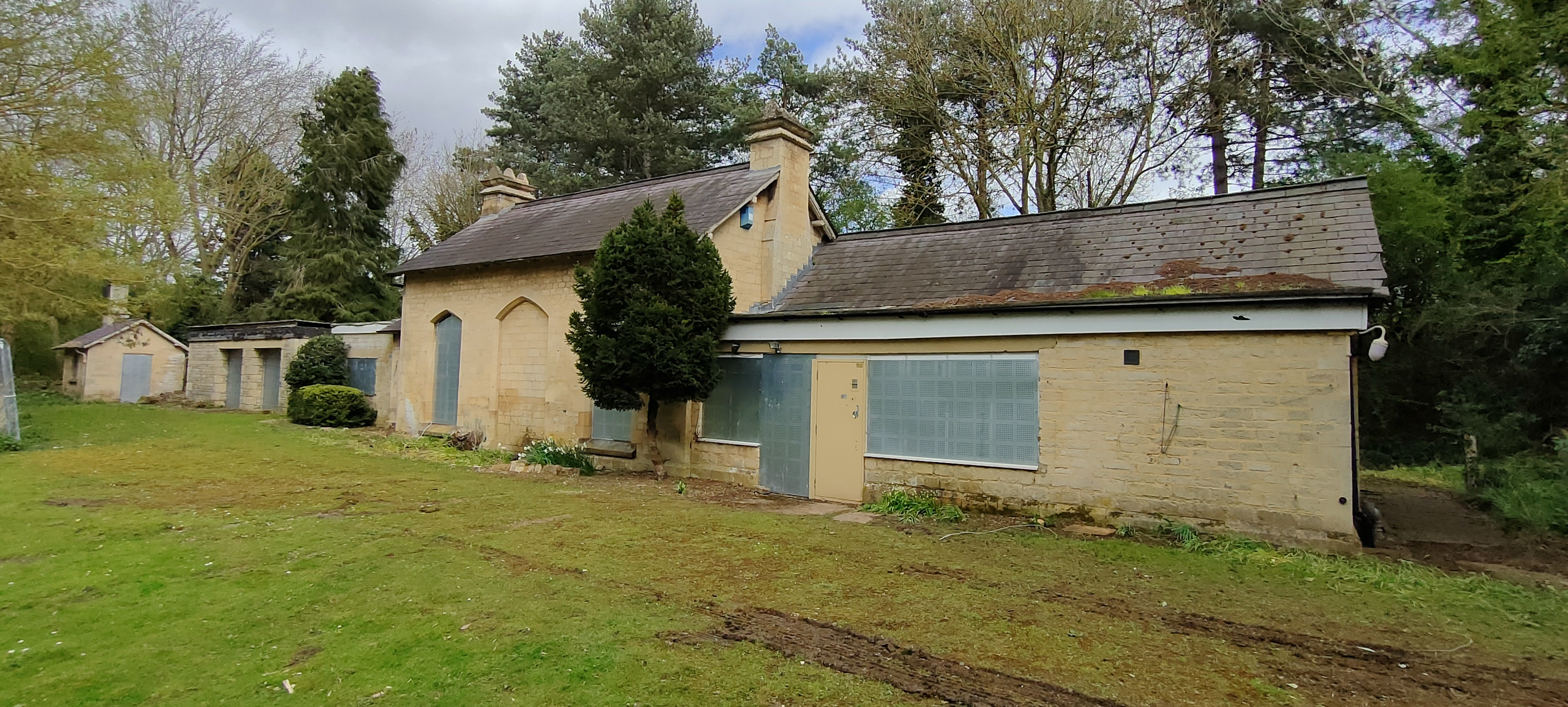
- The site of the station in April 2024

General information
- Location: Wansford, City of Peterborough; England
- Grid reference: TL089997
- Platforms: 1

Other information
- Status: Disused

History
- Pre-grouping: Great Northern Railway
- Post-grouping: London and North Eastern Railway

Key dates
- 1867: Opened
- 1929: Closed
- 2022: Plans and funding to relocate the building to Nene Valley Railway
- April 2024: Beginning of the building relocation
Location

Wansford Road railway station was located in Northamptonshire serving the village of Wansford. It was some distance east of the village on the A47 road, although still nearer than the more important Wansford station of the London & North Western Railway. The station was built in 1867.

Wansford Road station was on the Stamford and Essendine Railway line from Stamford to Wansford line which never really recovered from the 1926 general strike, and the whole line closed in 1929. The station building survived as a private residence.

When National Highways drew up plans to duplicate the A47 road, the station building lay in its path. In 2022 agreement was reached for the building to be dismantled and re-erected as the terminus of the Nene Valley Railway. The project will require an estimated £200,000 from the National Highways.

In April 2024 relocation work began with A47 access gate removed and buildings dismantled.

== View of the station buildings ==
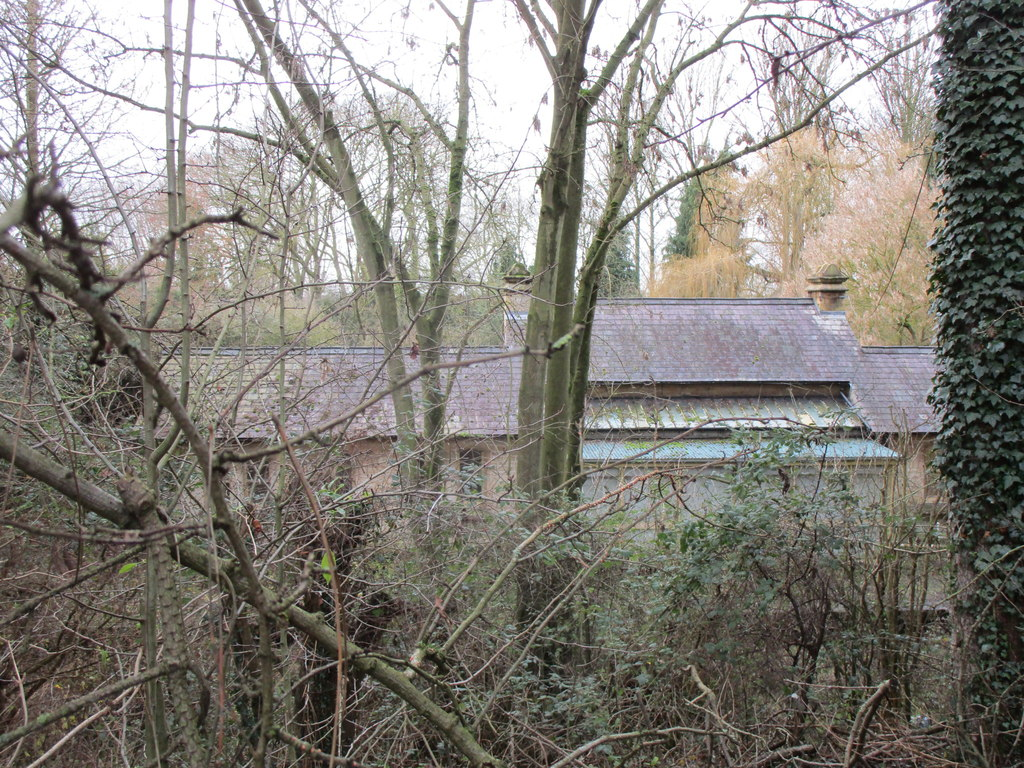
The site of the station in 2019

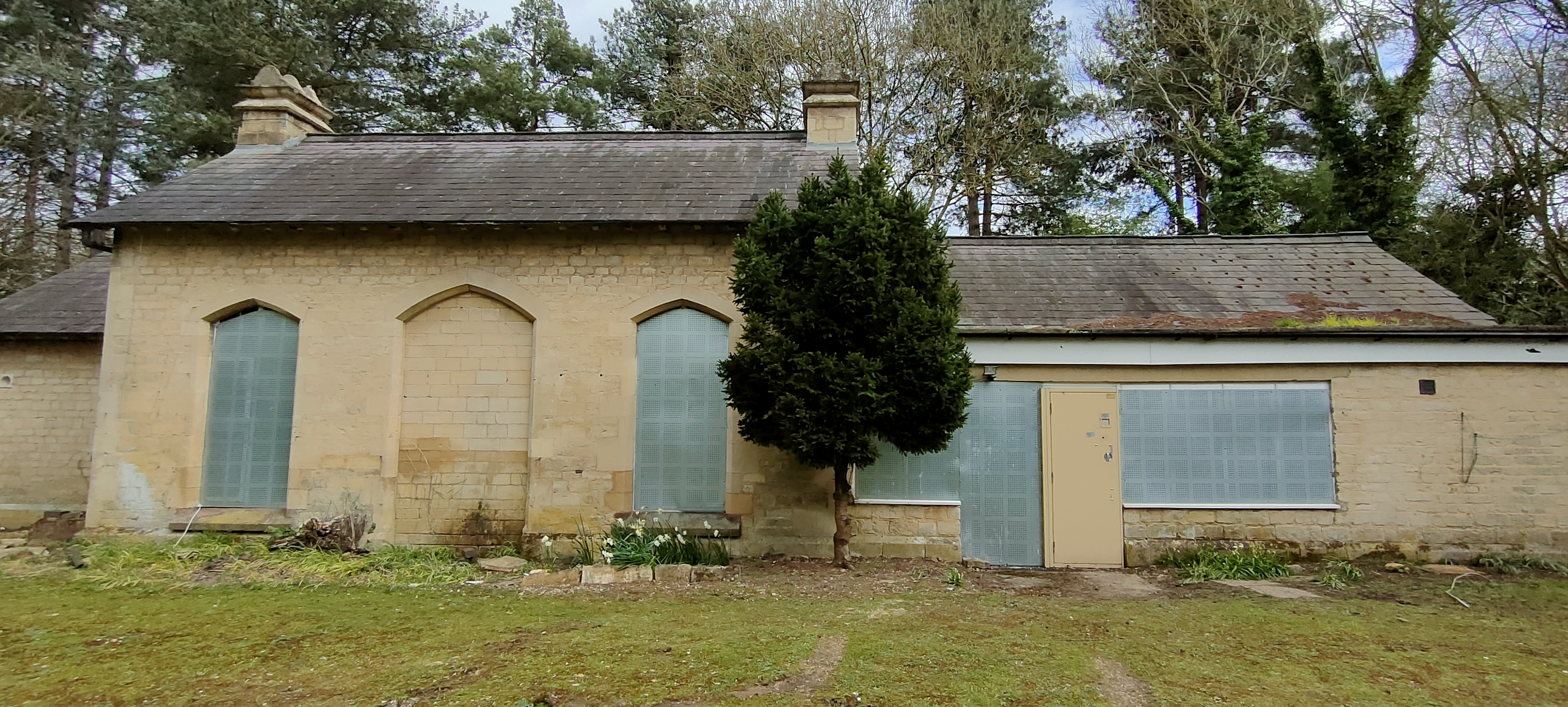
View of the main building in 2024

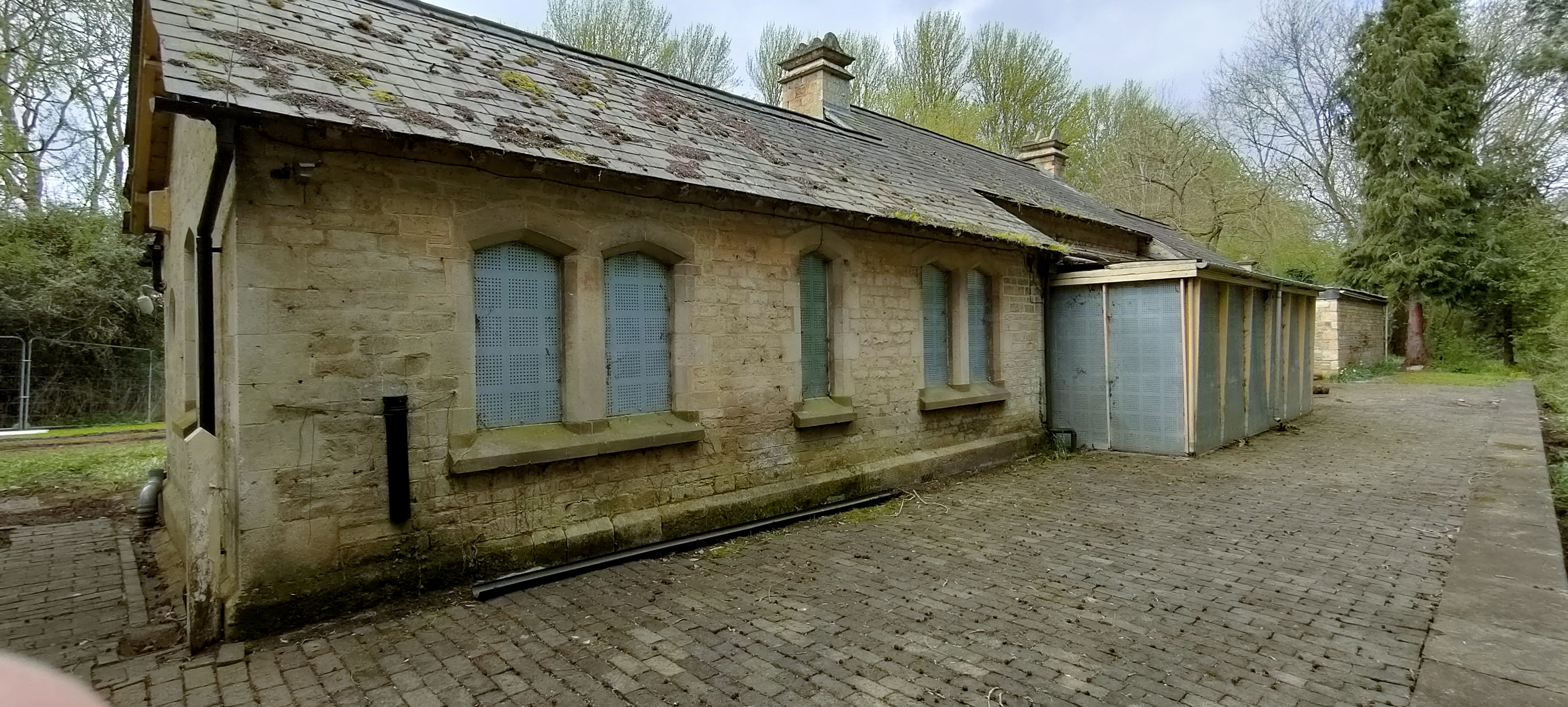
Platform view in 2024

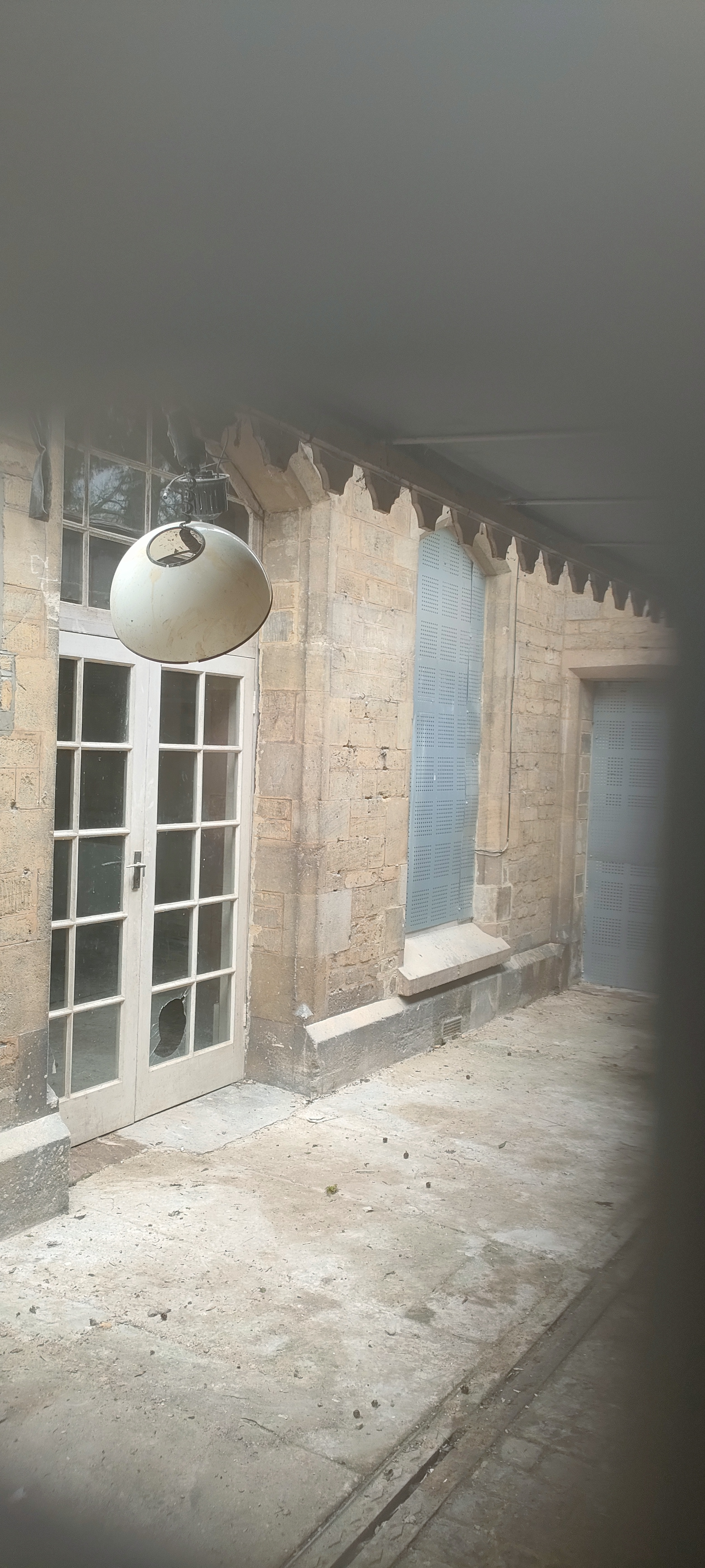
Platform entrance/exit seen through metal guards in 2024

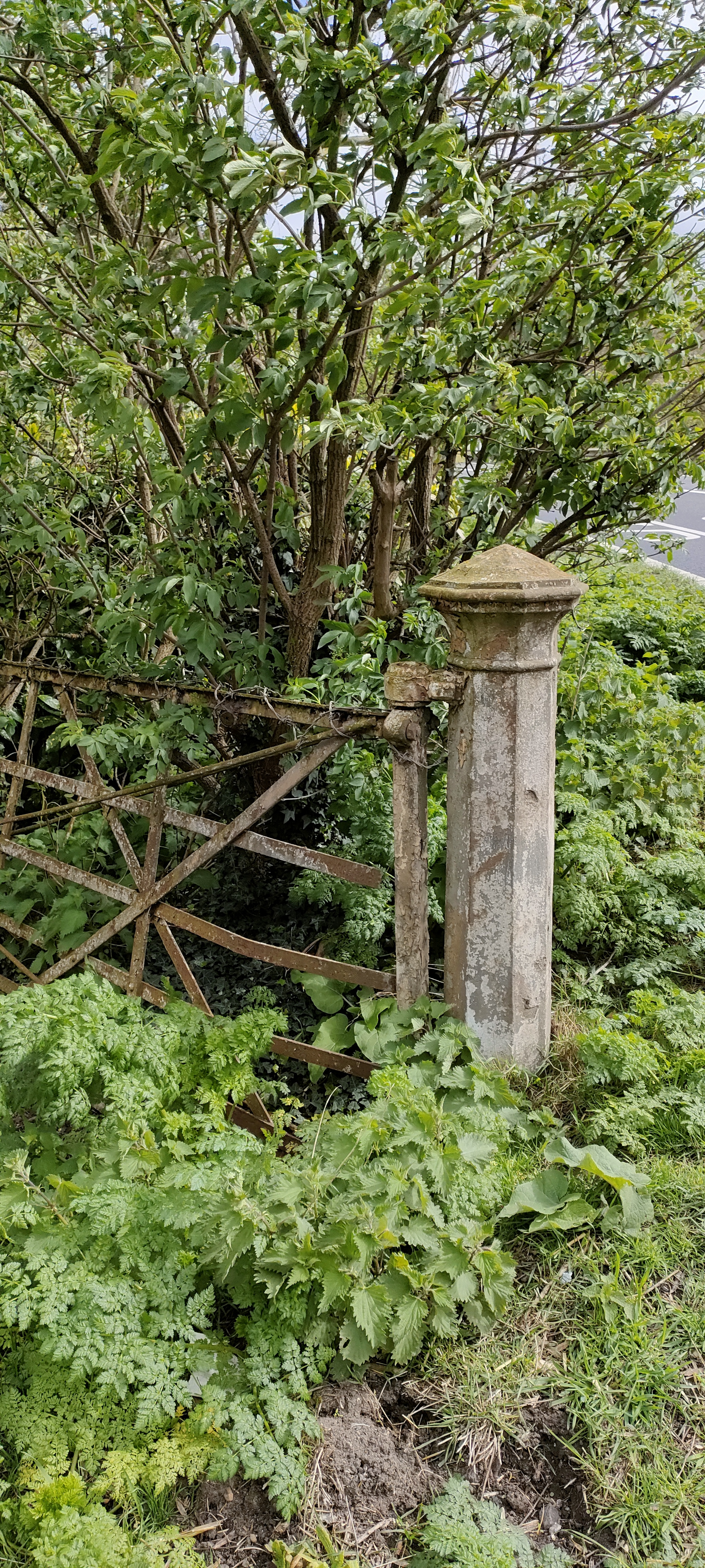
Gatepost on the access road from A47

== Site after building move ==
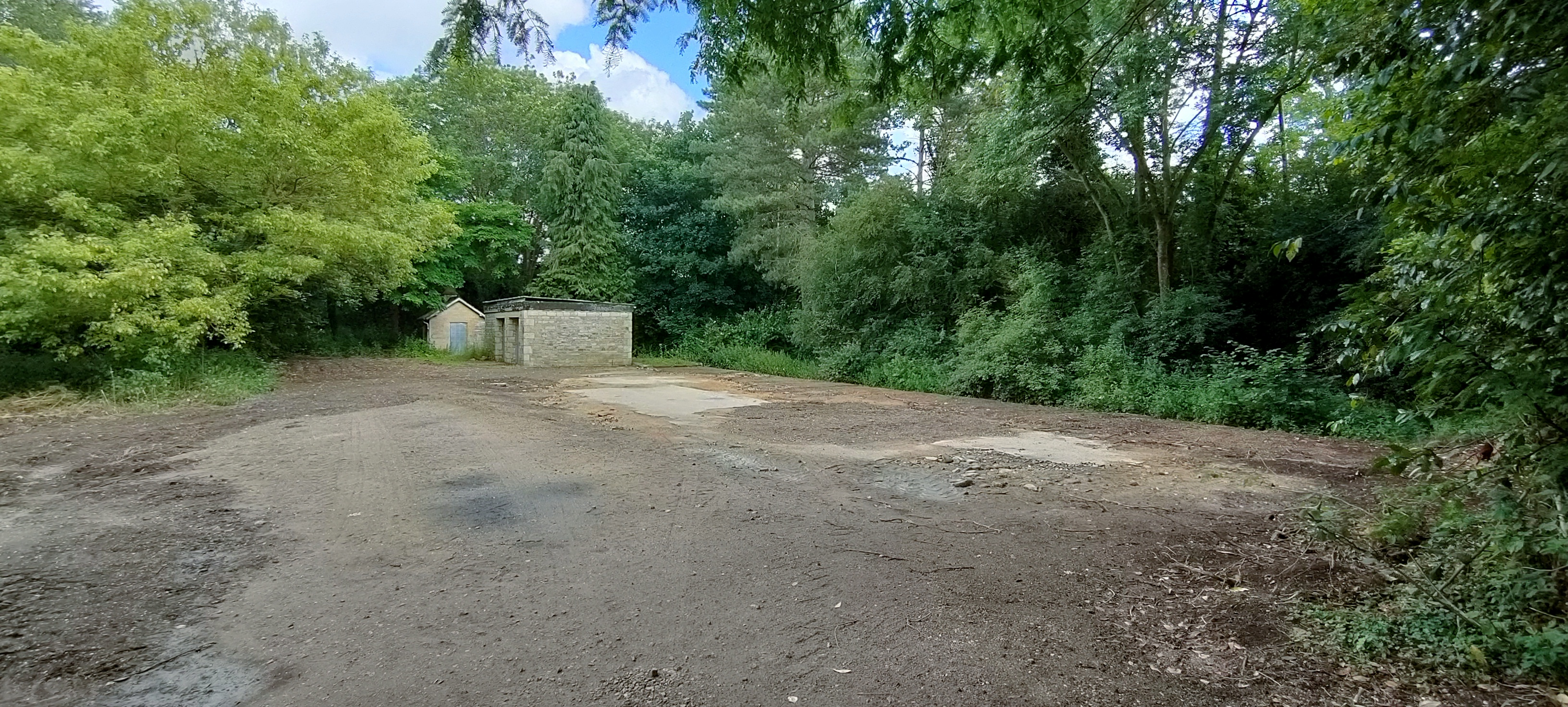
Site after building dismantled

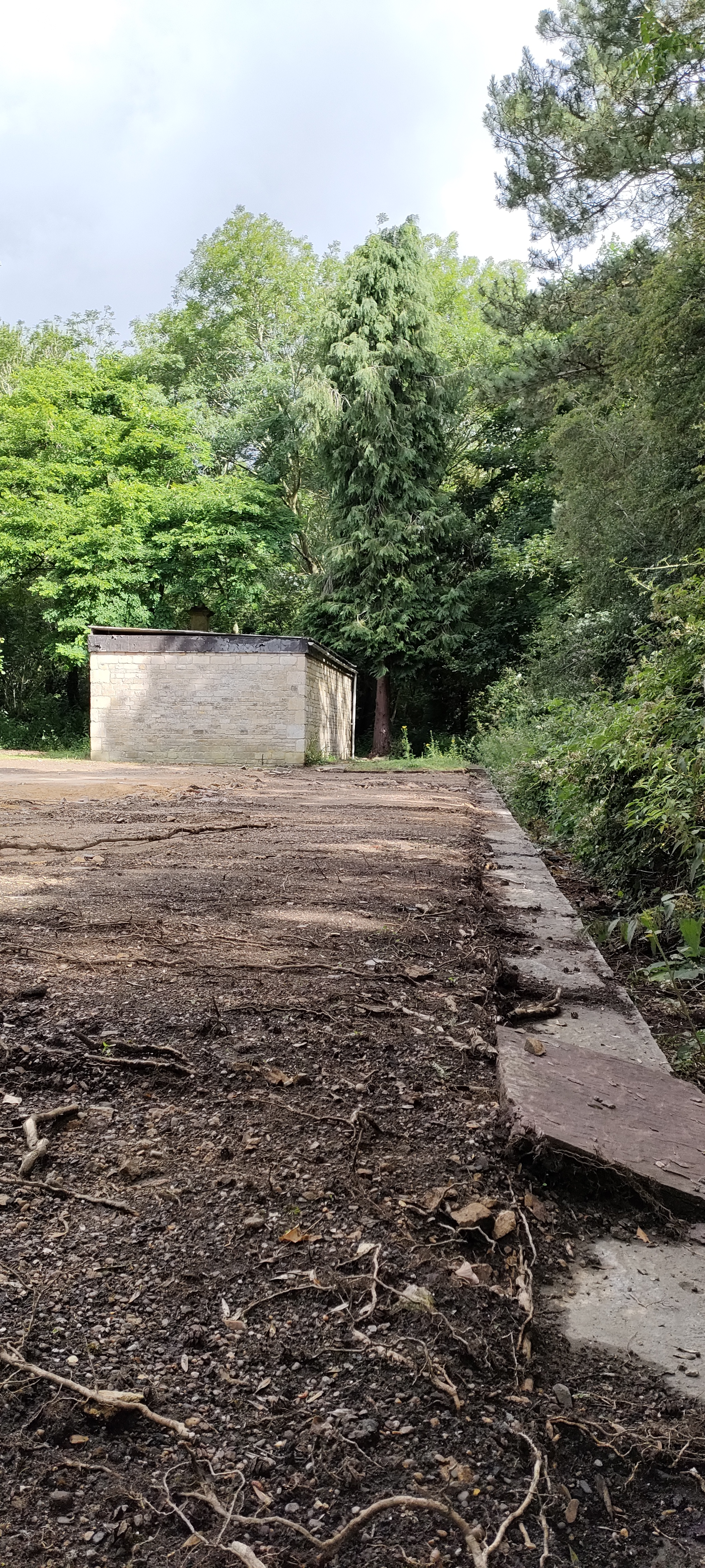
Remains of the platform with platform egde removed

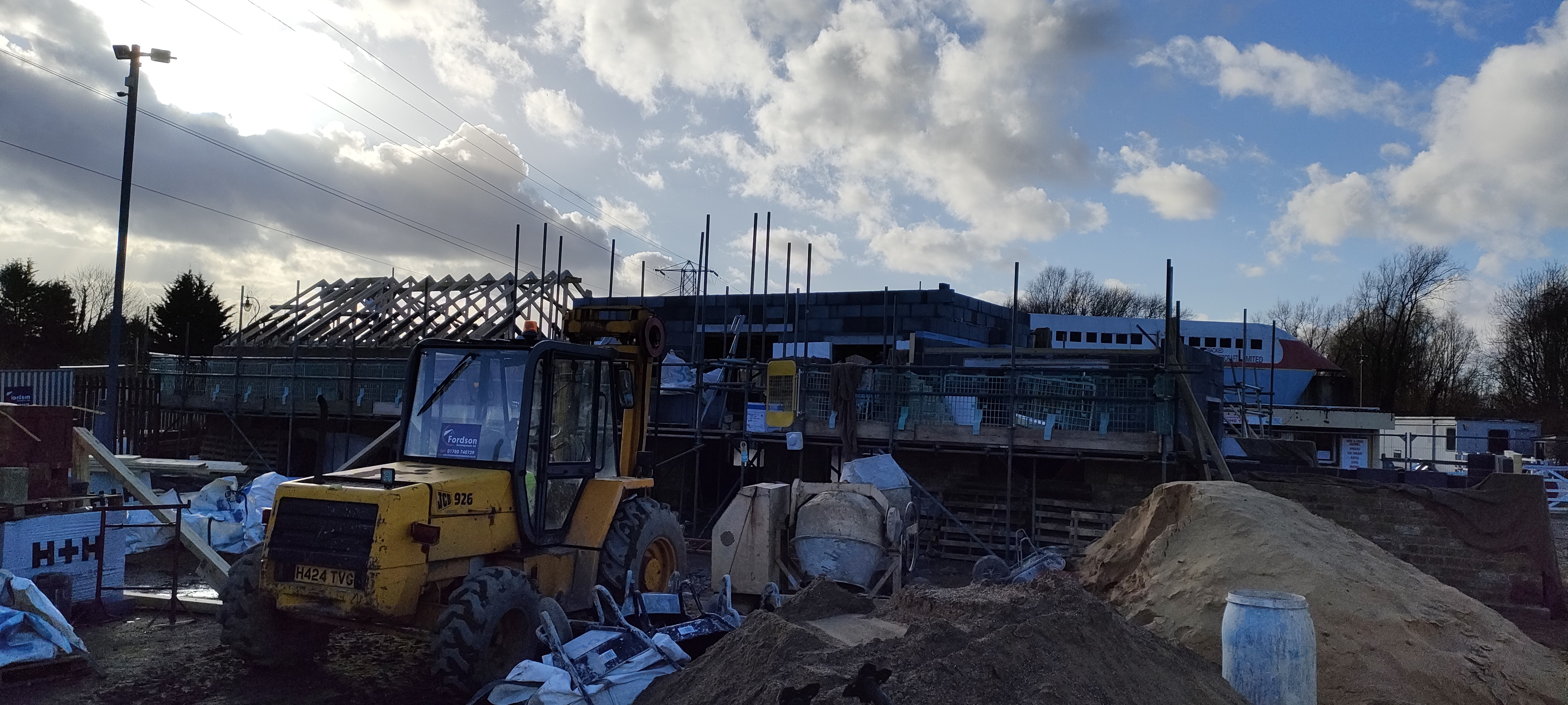
Rebuilt at the new site
Former Services

Preceding station	Disused railways	Following station
Ufford Bridge	Great Northern Railway; Stamford and Essendine Railway	Sibson
