= Wansford, Cambridgeshire =

Village in Cambridgeshire, England

Coordinates: 52.583°N 0.417°W

Wansford
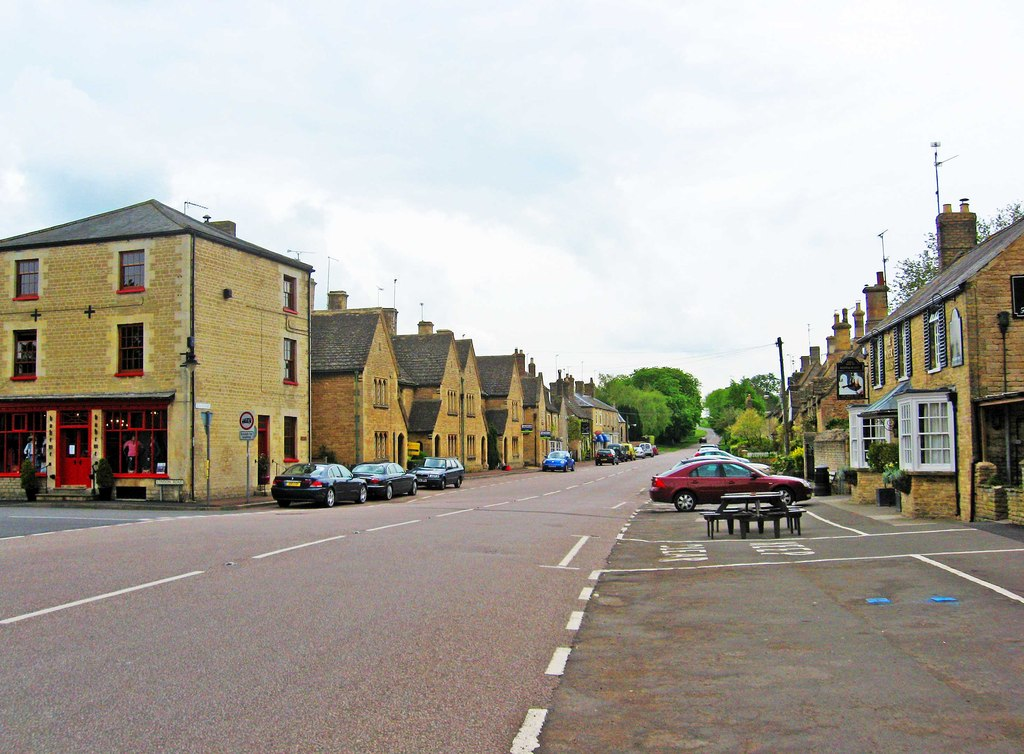
- Elton Road, Wansford

- Location within Cambridgeshire
- Population: 506
- Unitary authority: Huntingdonshire and Peterborough
- Ceremonial county: Cambridgeshire
- Region: East
- Country: England
- Sovereign state: United Kingdom
- Post town: PETERBOROUGH
- Postcode district: PE8
- Dialling code: 01780
- Police: Cambridgeshire
- Fire: Cambridgeshire
- Ambulance: East of England
- UK Parliament: North West Cambridgeshire

Wansford is a village straddling the City of Peterborough and Huntingdonshire districts in the ceremonial county of Cambridgeshire, England. It had a population of 506 at the 2021 Census. It is situated 7 miles (11 km) west of Peterborough and 8 miles (13 km) miles south of Stamford. It is close to the county boundary with both Lincolnshire and Northamptonshire. The village is also located close to the A1 road and was on the route of the original Great North Road before the modern A1 was built. The village has since been bypassed by the A1 but the former Great North Road still exists through the village.

== History ==
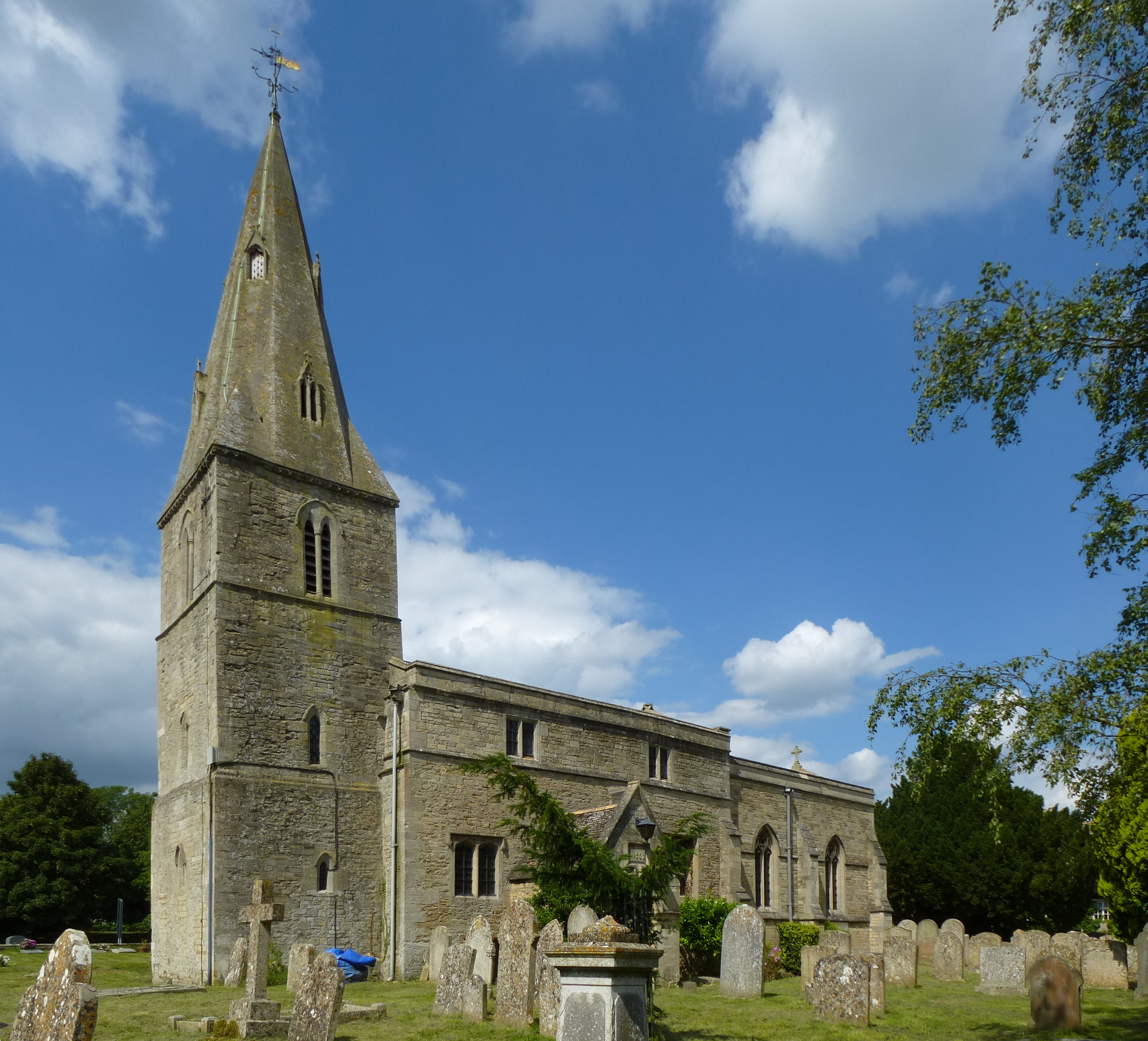
Wansford Parish Church in Wansford

The Parish Church of St Mary the Virgin is a Grade I listed building and is the main Church of England parish church of Wansford. The Norman font of circa 1120 has a cylindrical bowl with figures under arcading; it was found at Sibberton Lodge in Thornhaugh parish. There is also a former chapel in the village centre, now converted into a private residence.

The Great North Road crossed the River Nene on Wansford Old Bridge, which is a Grade I listed building. The stone bridge replaced a wooden bridge with eight arches damaged by floods in 1571. The Great North Road was diverted to the east and the 1920s concrete bridge is itself Grade II*; it now carries the northbound carriageway of the A1.

Wansford is under two parish councils. Wansford Parish Council, within the area of Peterborough City Council, comprises the village north of, and including, the Old Bridge. The village to the south of Wansford Old Bridge (The Haycock side) is represented by Sibson-cum-Stibbington Parish Council and comes under Huntingdonshire District Council. Wansford station is in Stibbington parish. The village was split between two counties until 1965 when it came under one authority, (Huntingdon and Peterborough and, from 1974, Cambridgeshire). The boundary post between the Soke of Peterborough in Northamptonshire (the north side of the River Nene) and Huntingdonshire (the south bank) is still there halfway across the bridge.

On 2 May 2007 the helicopter of Phillip Carter, entrepreneur and owner of the Haycock Hotel, was found as it had crashed nearby in woods at Kings Cliffe.

== "Wansford-in-England" ==
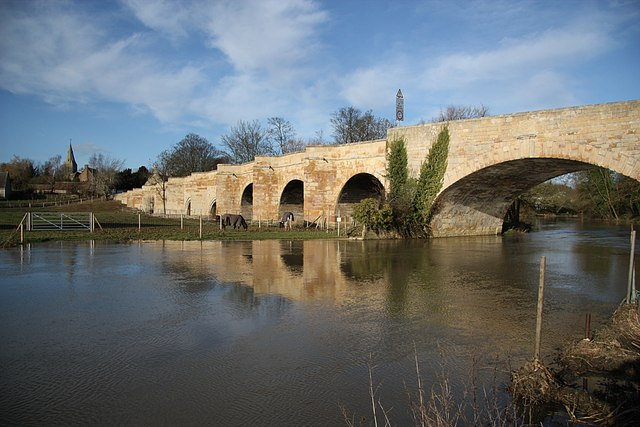
Wansford Bridge and the River Nene

According to local folklore, related in Defoe's A tour thro' the whole island of Great Britain (1724), the name Wansford-in-England comes from the tale of a local man who fell asleep on a hayrick and upon awakening found himself floating down the River Nene towards the sea. He asked a traveller on the riverbank where he was, and upon hearing the reply "Wansford", asked, "Wansford in England?". The name stuck and the Haycock Hotel takes its name from the legend.

This version of the story seems to be derived by oral transmission from "Barnabæ Itinerarium, or Barnabee's Journal", an account of four long and often drunken journeys north through England published by Richard Brathwait in 1638 and reprinted in 1820, with extensive notes, by Joseph Haslewood. The hero, Barnaby, was allegedly born in Appleby-in-Westmorland, and his surname may have been Harrington (there was much discussion of the truth of these facts in prefaces to later editions - and indeed as to whether Barnaby had ever existed). The poem is written in elegant Latin verse with a parallel translation into English doggerel (only the English is given here).

The references to Wansford are in the third journey, after Barnaby has visited Stilton and before he heads north to Stamford. As the second verse shows, he arrived when Wansford had been hit by the plague and the doors were marked with warnings.

== Transport ==
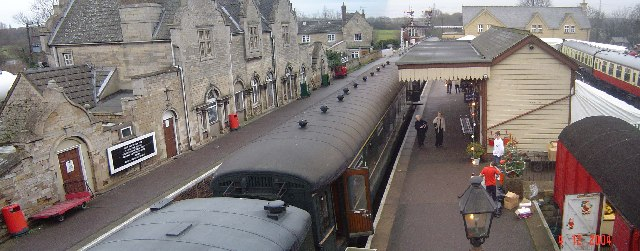
Wansford railway station now part of the Nene Valley Railway

Wansford has no real regular bus services aside from ring-and-ride buses and school bus services. The nearest village with regular bus services to Peterborough, Stamford and Bourne is Barnack and further afield is Peterborough. The village was served by two railway stations, Wansford railway station was under miles southwest of the village on the former Northampton and Peterborough Railway which connected the village with Northampton, Wellingborough, Irthlingborough, Raunds, Thrapston, Oundle and Peterborough. The station was opened in 1845 and the station was also a junction for a branch line to Stamford East railway station via Barnack.

An additional station to serve the main village centre, called Wansford Road railway station, opened in 1867. This station though was also a distance from the main village centre and closed along with the branch line to Stamford East in 1929. Wansford station closed in 1957 to passengers and the stretch of the line from Northampton to Oundle in 1964. The line between Oundle and Peterborough via Wansford remained open for freight traffic and a boarding school in Oundle until 1972, when it too was closed. The station and line reopened around five years later under the Nene Valley Railway, a heritage railway group and trust. They bought the railway line between Yarwell and Peterborough via Wansford and they built a new station building at Wansford and now use the station for their main operations and headquarters.

In 2022, it was announced that National Highways planned to convert the single carriageway of the A47 between Leicester and Peterborough into a dual carriage way. This would involve cutting through part of the former Stamford to Wansford Branch Line and the relocating of Wansford Road station. Nene Valley Railway agreed to take the building and reuse it at their Peterborough terminus. This is still in the process of occurring.

== See also ==
- Wansford Pasture
- Wansford railway station
- Wansford Road railway station
- Wansford Tunnel
