= Wilfrid Wood =

British engraver and painter (1888–1976)

Wilfrid René Wood (1 December 1888 – 18 February 1976) was a British engraver and watercolourist.

== Biography ==
Wood was born on 1 December 1888, in Cheadle Hulme. His mother was an artist and his father a cutler and surgical instrument maker. He was educated at Manchester Grammar School, leaving at age 16. He then studied art at Manchester School of Art, and at the Central School of Arts and Crafts and the Slade School of Fine Art in London.

During World War I, Wood enlisted in the Artists' Rifles and was commissioned in the Machine Gun Corps, serving in France & Flanders and Italy; he continued to sketch during his war service. He lived in Hampstead, London from 1920 to 1937, and in 1926, he created a series of posters for the London Underground. For a time he served as vice-president of the Manchester Academy of Fine Arts. He hosted multiple solo exhibitions at the Royal Academy of Arts.

On 3 March 1937, Wood married Margary Joan Beeby Kingsford (1883–1974) at the church of St Martin-in-the-Fields, London; she was a sister of illustrator Florence Kingsford Cockerell. They settled in the village of Barnack in 1937. He died there on 18 February 1976, aged 87.

== Published works ==
- By Underground to Kew; Michaelmas Daisy (1926)
- By Underground to Kew; Strelitzia Reginae (1926)
- By Underground to Kew Gardens; Water Lilies (1926)
- By Underground to Kew Gardens; Wistaria (1926)
- Stamford pictorial map
- Drawings of Stamford (1956)
