= Carlby =

Village and civil parish in Lincolnshire, England

Coordinates: 52°42′49″N 0°26′46″W

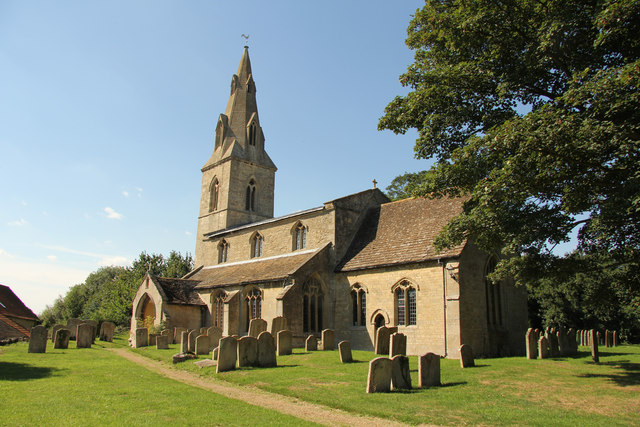
St Stephen's Church

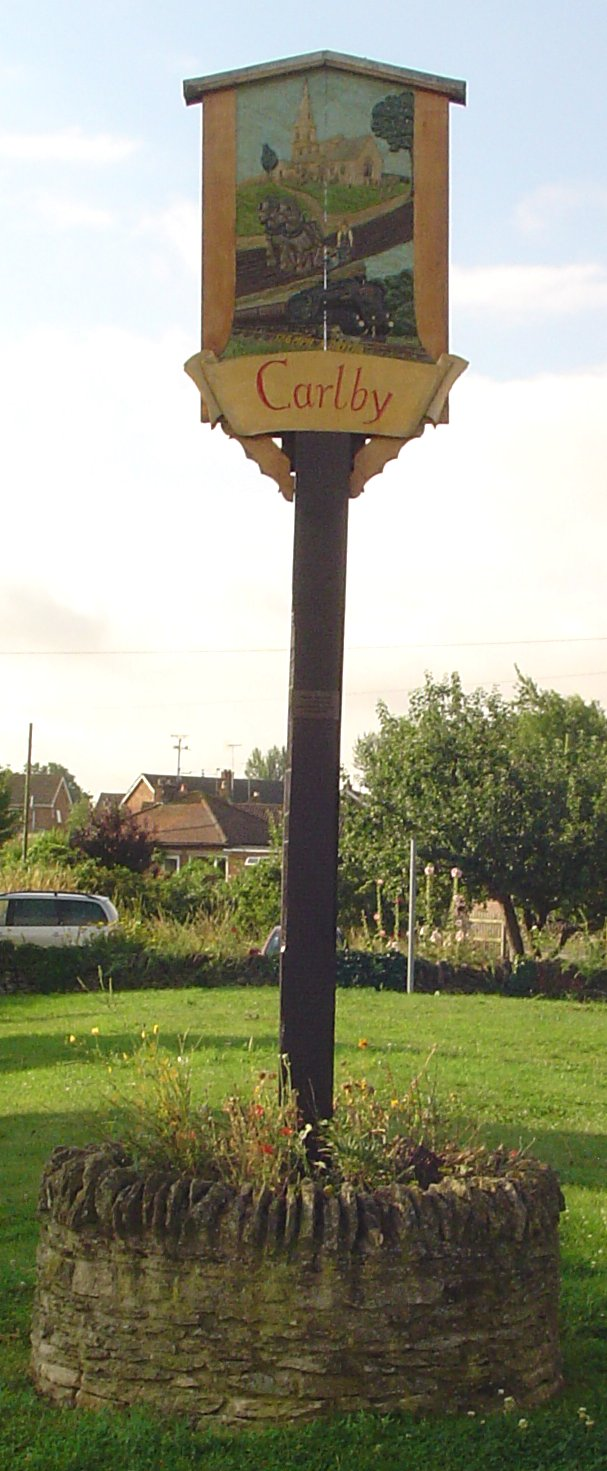
Village sign in Carlby

Carlby is a small village and civil parish in the district of South Kesteven in Lincolnshire, England. The population of the civil parish at the 2011 census was 542.

It is located four miles south of Bourne on the A6121 road near the Lincolnshire/Rutland boundary, which is partly the River West Glen.

The ecclesiastical parish is 'Ryhall with Essendine and Carlby', part of the Rutland Deanery of the Diocese of Peterborough. The parish church is dedicated to St Stephen. The current building dates from 1134. It has a medieval wall painting, partially uncovered during restoration work in the 1930s.

The village has a playing field and a children's recreational area. In 1986 the villagers replaced the wooden village hall with a brick structure.
