= Ryhall =

Village and civil parish in Rutland, England

Coordinates: 52.685°N 0.466°W

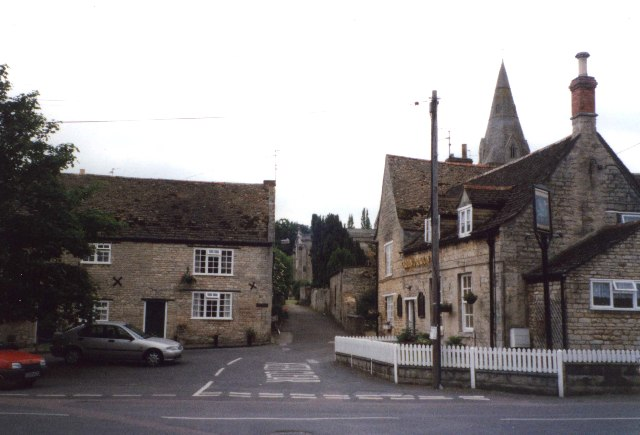

- Location within Rutland
- Area: 4.19 sq mi (10.9 km^{2})
- Population: 1,614 2011 Census
  - Density: 392/sq mi (151/km^{2})
- OS grid reference: TF036108
  - London: 83 miles (134 km) SSE
- Unitary authority: Rutland
- Ceremonial county: Rutland
- Region: East Midlands
- Country: England
- Sovereign state: United Kingdom
- Post town: STAMFORD
- Postcode district: PE9
- Dialling code: 01780
- Police: Leicestershire
- Fire: Leicestershire
- Ambulance: East Midlands
- UK Parliament: Rutland and Stamford

Ryhall is a village and civil parish in the county of Rutland in the East Midlands of England. It is situated close to the eastern boundary of the county, about 2 miles (3 km) north of Stamford. The parish includes the hamlet of Belmesthorpe.

== History ==
The village's name means 'Rye nook'. The 'nook' in question has been identified as a bend in the River Gwash.

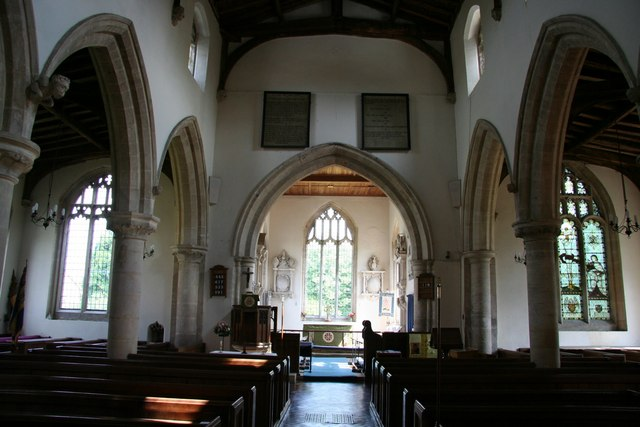
Nave of the church

The 13th-century Church of St John the Evangelist, Ryhall, has a number of carved figures around the exterior. The southern entrance has a porch with a room over it, originally for the priest, now called the Parvis Room.

Saint Tibba, patron saint of falconers, is believed to have lived in Ryhall in the 7th century. She was buried here, but in the 11th century her relics were translated to Peterborough Abbey, now Peterborough Cathedral, by Abbot Ælfsige (1006–1042). According to legend, St Tibba was a niece of King Penda of Mercia. The remains of a small hermitage associated with the saint can be seen on the west side of the north aisle of church.

A 19th-century book refers to a holy well dedicated to Saint Tibba, though the location cannot now be identified, and there is similar doubt about the location of a well said to have been dedicated to Tibba's alleged relative, St Ebba.

The route of the Stamford and Essendine railway passed through the parish, on embankments still clearly visible today. It included a station called "Ryhall & Belmisthorpe", located in Belmesthorpe. The line opened in 1856 but closed a century later in 1959.

== Community ==
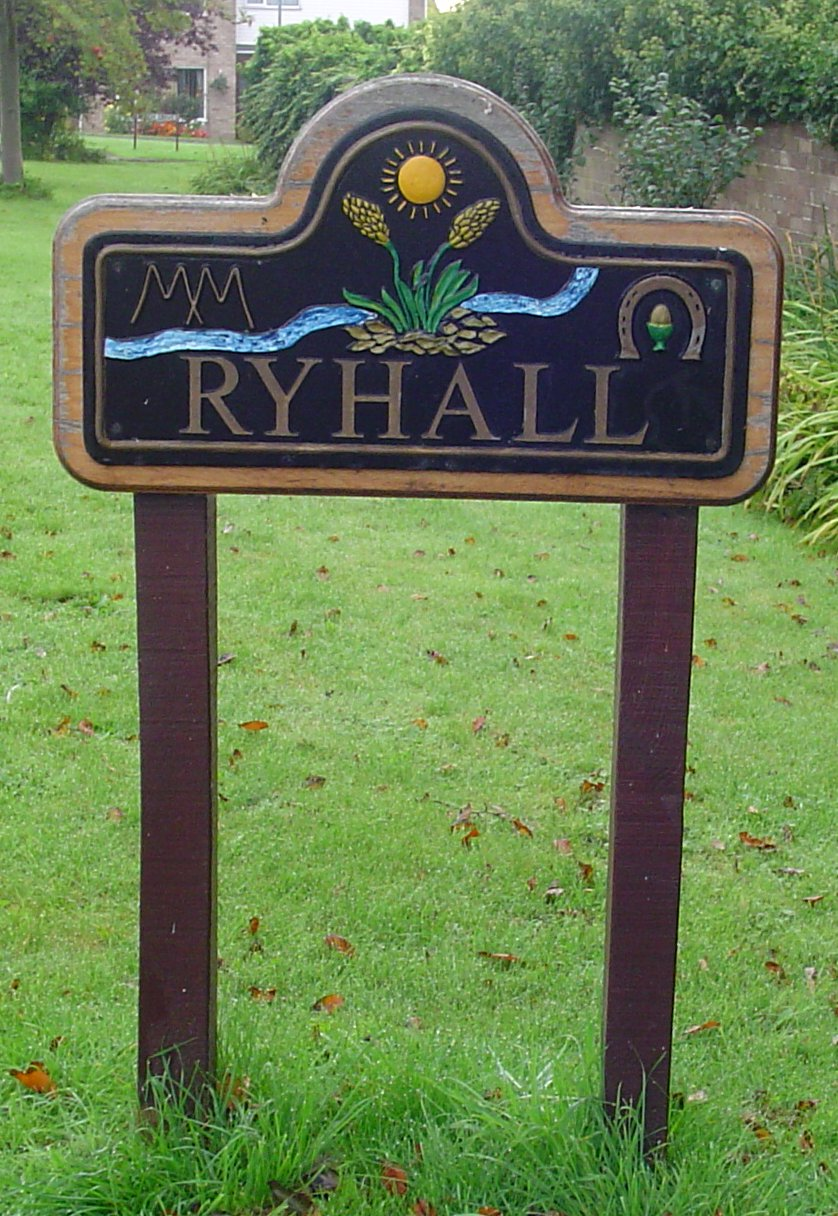
Village sign

In 2021 Ryhall had a population of 2,936, making it one of the largest villages in Rutland. It is bounded to its west by the A6121 main road from Stamford to Bourne and on the other three sides by the River Gwash, although some development has spilled over the river to the north and out along the Essendine road.

Ryhall has a Church of England Academy School with an attendance, in March 2022, of 192 pupils aged 4 to 11.

The village also has a post office/village shop, Methodist Chapel, library and two public houses, The Millstone and The Green Dragon. The former Fordham's supermarket of the 1960s-70s was a kitchen showroom, which closed in 2016.

=== Sport ===
The local football club, Ryhall United F.C. left Ryhall in 2015, moving to nearby Stamford under the new name of Stamford Lions.

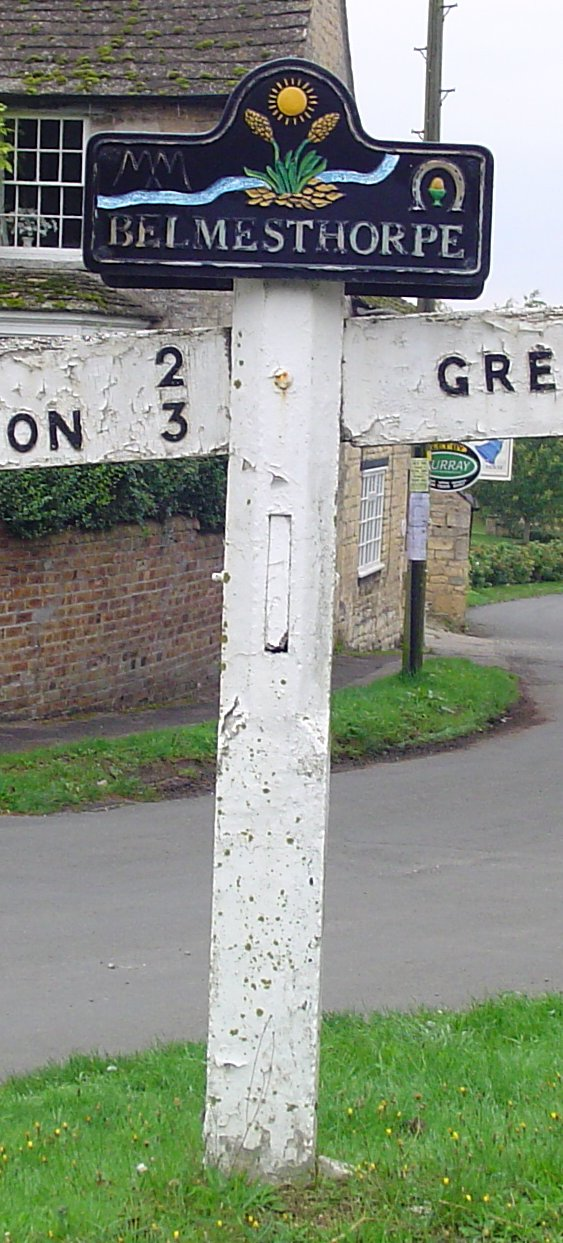
Sign in Belmesthorpe

=== Parish structure ===
Also in the parish is the hamlet of Belmesthorpe situated just South of Ryhall about three miles (5 km) north of Stamford in Lincolnshire. Apart from the Blue Bell Inn, there are two old farmhouses here as well as a few old cottages in the main street as well as two former dovecotes both now converted into private dwellings. Castle Rise is a cul-de-sac added in the 1960s but there is no evidence for any castle having been located there.

The ecclesiastical parish is Ryhall with Essendine and Carlby, part of the Rutland Deanery of the Diocese of Peterborough.

== See also ==
- Carlby
- Essendine
- Kyneburga, Kyneswide and Tibba. the dynasty of St Tibba
- Nearby Holywell
