= Barnack =

Village in Cambridgeshire, England

Coordinates: 52.633°N 0.407°W

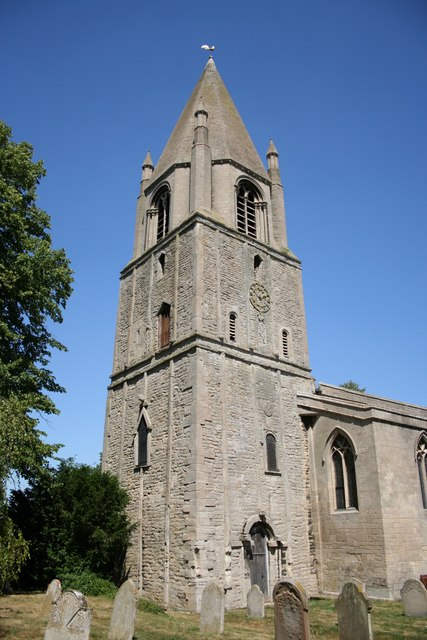
- Anglo-Saxon tower and Early English spire of St John the Baptist's church

- Location within Cambridgeshire
- Population: 1,000
- OS grid reference: TF0705
- Civil parish: Barnack
- Unitary authority: Peterborough
- Ceremonial county: Cambridgeshire
- Region: East
- Country: England
- Sovereign state: United Kingdom
- Post town: Stamford
- Postcode district: PE9
- Dialling code: 01780
- Police: Cambridgeshire
- Fire: Cambridgeshire
- Ambulance: East of England
- UK Parliament: North West Cambridgeshire
- Website: Barnack Parish Council

Barnack is a village and civil parish in the Peterborough unitary authority of the ceremonial county of Cambridgeshire, England, and the historic county of Northamptonshire. Barnack is in the north-west of the unitary authority, 4 miles (6.4 km) south-east of Stamford, Lincolnshire. The parish includes the hamlet of Pilsgate about 1 mile (1.6 km) northwest of Barnack. Both Barnack and Pilsgate are on the B1443 road. The 2021 Census recorded a parish population of 1000.

Barnack is historically part of the Soke of Peterborough, which was associated with Northamptonshire but had its own County Council from 1888 until 1965. From 1894 until 1965 there was a Barnack Rural District, which was a subdivision of the Soke and formed part of Huntingdon and Peterborough until 1974.

Barnack is notable for its former limestone industry, its Anglo-Saxon parish church and an unusual early Bronze Age burial. Hills and Holes, an area of Roman and later quarrying, is now a nature reserve.

== The Barnack burial ==
The Barnack burial is an important early Bronze Age find. It comes from a complicated monument, which was expanded and altered on at least three occasions. The original burial was very rich for the period but was covered by only a small barrow. Later additional burials and cremations were cut into the barrow and it was enlarged twice. Probably at the same time, three concentric ditches were dug around the barrow. The final monument contained at least 23 bodies and had a diameter of 50 metres (160 ft).

When gravel quarrying threatened the barrow in 1974 the decision was taken to excavate. The objects recovered were given to the British Museum but replicas are displayed in Peterborough Museum and Art Gallery.

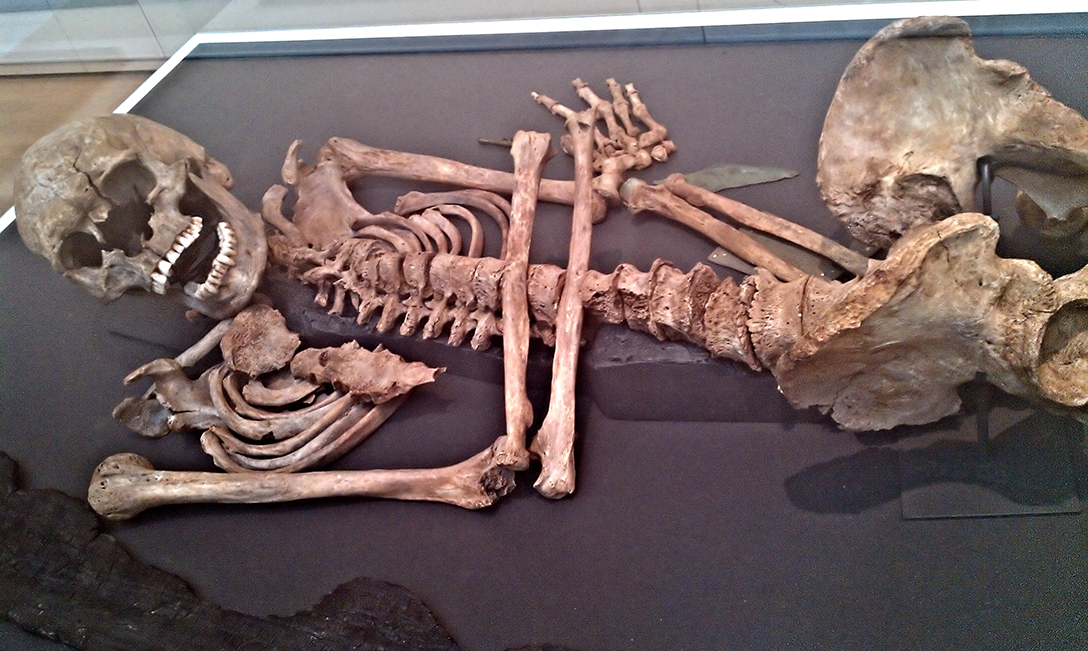
The Barnack Burial displayed in the British Museum

=== The primary burial ===
The primary burial was of a man aged between 35 and 45. He died some time between 2330 and 2130 BC. He was very robustly built and quite tall for the time: about 5 feet 10 inches (1.78 m). He was suffering from slight arthritis. Marks on his bones and on those of the other people in the barrow show that they were used to squatting. It is unknown if this was due to their work or just how they sat. His teeth had no disease but were well worn, showing he ate mainly a gritty diet of cereals.

=== The grave goods ===
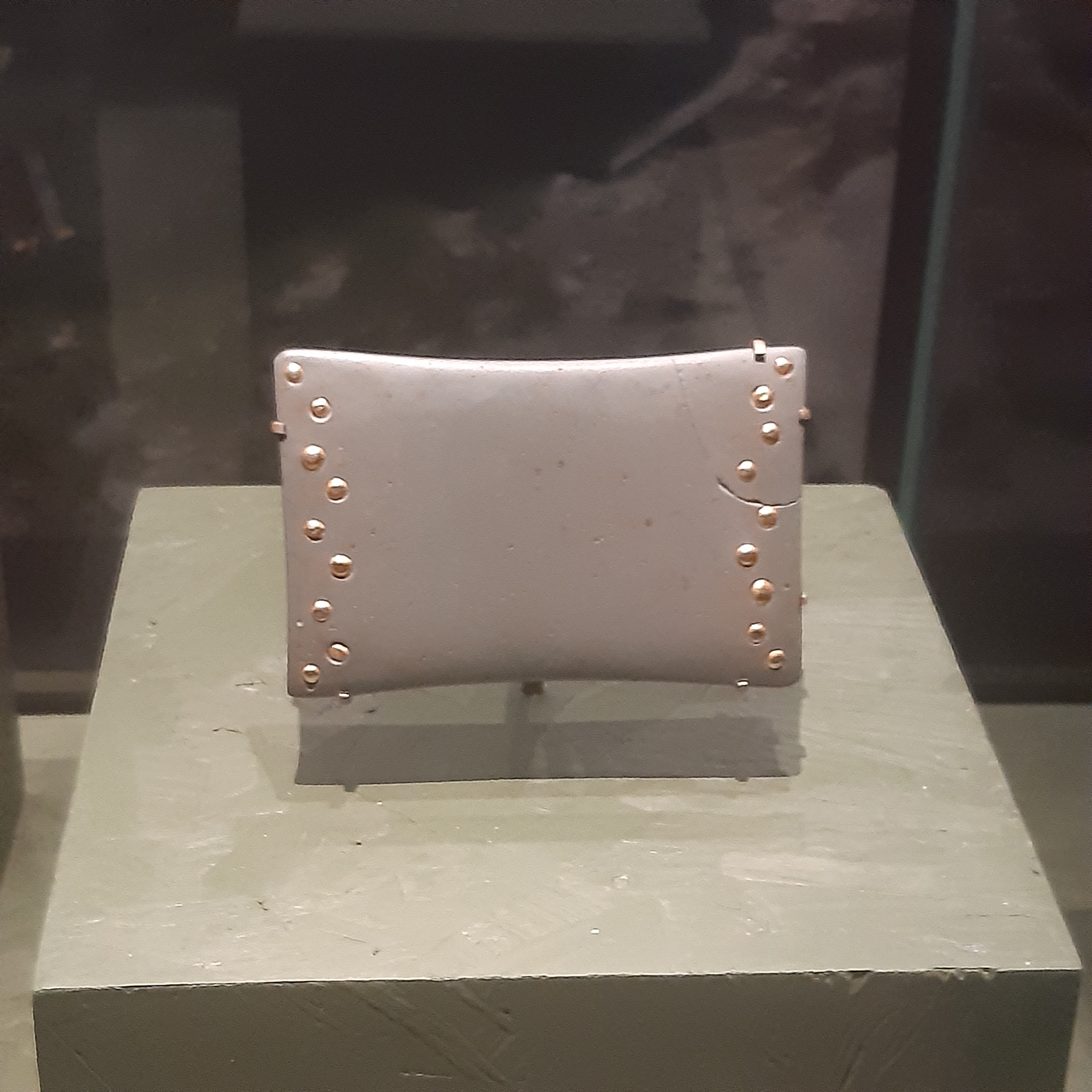
Wrist-guard from the grave in the British Museum

The grave goods of the primary burial are rare and prestigious. There is a large beaker pot and a copper dagger, common items found in graves of the time. There is also a piece of oak charcoal; it is unknown what this was for and archaeologists have been unable to provide an adequate explanation of why it was buried in the grave. There is an unusual pendant made of either bone from a sperm whale or walrus ivory, but the most luxurious item is a stone wrist-guard. These stone wrist-guards normally have between two and six holes carefully drilled into them. However the wrist-guard from Barnack has eighteen holes, and each one was filled with a foil-thin disc of gold. The wrist-guard, made of greenstone, was never intended to be worn since the gold caps in the holes would have stopped it from being tied to the arm. Fewer than a hundred such wrist-guards have been found in Great Britain and the example from Barnack is arguably the finest. A similar less-refined wrist-guard from Driffield, in East Yorkshire, is also in the British Museum.

== Parish church ==
The Church of England parish church of St John the Baptist is notable for its 11th-century Anglo-Saxon tower. The interior of the church includes a high-quality late Anglo-Saxon Romanesque sculpture of Christ in Majesty. The tower is topped by what may be one of the earliest spires in England, dating to around the 12th century.

== Economic and social history ==
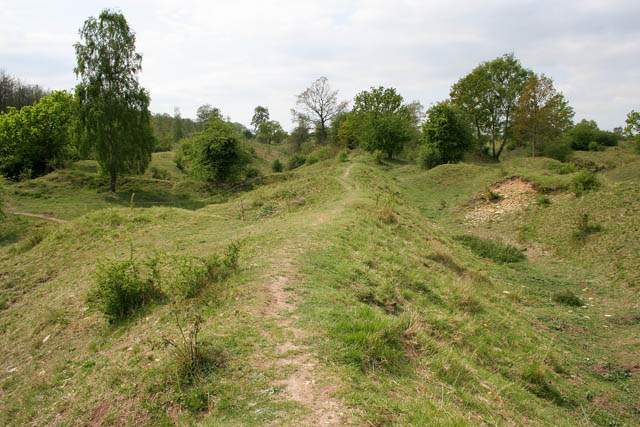
The Barnack Hills & Holes National Nature Reserve, former limestone quarries, are now a national nature reserve

=== Barnack stone ===
Oolitic Lincolnshire limestone, including some called Barnack rag, was a valuable building stone first used by the Romans. Quarrying continued in the Middle Ages when the abbeys at Peterborough, Crowland, Ramsey, Sawtry and Bury St Edmunds all used Barnack stone, and the monasteries were frequently in dispute over the rights to it. Blocks of stone were transported on sleds to the river Welland and loaded onto barges on which they were taken down the River Nene and the Fenland waterways. Most notably, Barnack stone was used to build Peterborough and Ely Cathedrals. Barnack stone was also used extensively for buildings in Stamford.

It is likely that the stone was also carved in the village. A possible Barnack school of Anglo-Saxon sculpture has been identified.

The stone was used for numerous buildings in Barnack itself, most notably the parish church. Another notable example is 7 Station Road, which is a 13th- or 14th-century house remodelled in the 16th or early 17th century. It is a Grade II* listed building.

The best Barnack stone had been worked out by about 1460, but after the dissolution of the monasteries supplies became available from demolition of the Fenland monasteries and was reused in Cambridge colleges. Lesser-quality Barnack stone continued to be quarried until the 18th century, and in 1825 it was quarried as roadstone for the Great North Road.

After the useful stone had been removed, the bare heaps of lime-rich rubble were gradually covered by a rich carpet of wild flowers, such as the pasque flower and pyramidal orchid, which can be seen today. The quarry area, now a national nature reserve and Site of Special Scientific Interest, is called the Hills and Holes or Hills and Hollows.

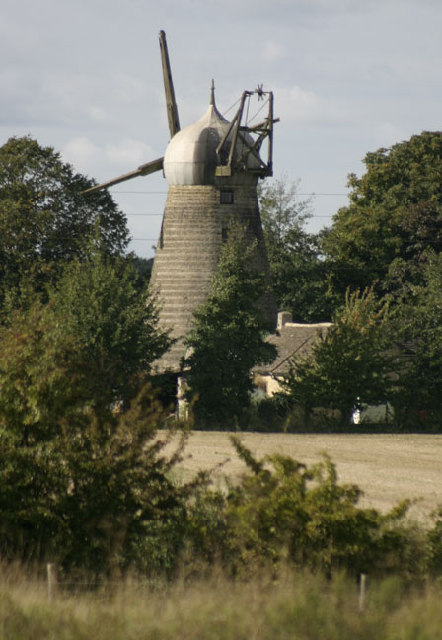
Barnack tower mill, built in 1797 and restored in 1959–62

=== Apples ===
The Barnack Beauty apple variety was first cultivated here in about 1840.

=== Mills ===
Barnack water mill was built in the 18th century. Its undershot water wheel is in situ but none of the mill's interior machinery remains.

Barnack windmill is a tower mill built of Barnack stone in 1797. Its commercial use as a mill ceased in 1914 and for a time it stood derelict. Its interior machinery survives complete and the mill was restored in 1959–62.

=== Railways ===
In 1846 the Syston and Peterborough Railway opened. It included a station in the parish about 1 mile (1.6 km) north of Barnack. It was nearer Uffington, Lincolnshire than Barnack, so initially it was called Uffington station. The Syston – Peterborough line was absorbed by the Midland Railway, which in 1858 renamed the station Uffington and Barnack. British Railways closed the station in 1952 and that line's nearest station to Barnack is now Stamford. The disused Uffington and Barnack station survives and is a listed building.

In 1867 the Great Northern Railway opened a branch line linking Stamford and Wansford, with a Barnack railway station on the east side of the village. The London and North Eastern Railway absorbed the GNR in 1923 and closed the branch line in 1929.

=== School and village hall ===
In the middle of the 19th century a house in the village built in 1797 was converted into the parish school. In the 20th century the school moved to new premises and the building was converted into the village hall.

=== 1963 Handley Page Victor crash ===
On 20 March 1963 at 7.14pm, Handley Page Victor XM714, of 100 Sqn, crashed, having only just taken off from RAF Wittering. Five aircrew were killed and one ejected and survived.

- Flt Lt Brendan Jackson, aged 27, of Birdham in West Sussex, co-pilot, later Air Chief Marshal Brendan Jackson
- Flt Lt Alexander D Galbraith of south Manchester, pilot
- Flt Lt Edward J Vernon of Warrington
- Flt Lt James Churchill of Houghton le Spring, with wife Pamela and two children
- Flying Off Terence I Sandford of Swindon
- Master Navigator Albert Stringer

The survivor, Flt Lt Jackson, attended RAF Hospital Ely.

== Notable people ==
Charles Kingsley, author of The Water Babies, spent his childhood at the Rectory. His brother, Henry Kingsley, was born there in 1830. They were the sons of the Rev. Charles Kingsley the elder and Mary, née Lucas. The Rectory was largely rebuilt later in the 19th century and is now called Kingsley House.

The painter Wilfrid Wood (1888–1976) lived in a 17th-century thatched cottage, Littlefield, on Station Road, Barnack from 1938. The village hall is now named after him.

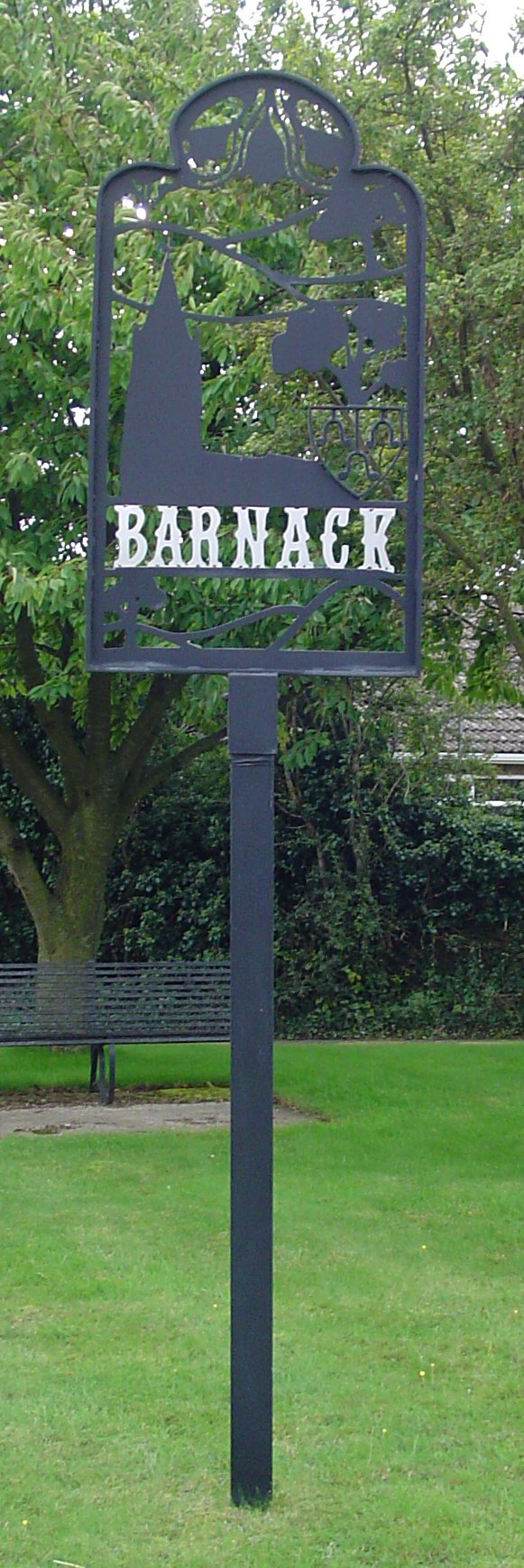
Barnack village sign

== Amenities ==
Barnack has a primary school, a pub, two bed and breakfasts, a MOT test centre and a garage. There are also several other small businesses and an agricultural goods supplier.

== Sources and further reading ==
- Alexander, Jennifer S (1995). "Building Stone from the East Midlands Quarries: Sources, Transportation and Usage" (PDF). Medieval Archaeology. 39: 107–135.
- Cramp, Rosemary J (1977). "Schools of Mercian sculpture". In Dornier, Ann (ed.). Mercian Studies. Leicester: Leicester University Press. pp. 191–233. ISBN 0718511484.
- Goodwin, J Martin (1983) 'The Book of Barnack' (Barracuda Books Ltd, Buckingham, ISBN 0 86023 158 5).
- Pevsner, Nikolaus (1968). Bedfordshire and the County of Huntingdon and Peterborough. The Buildings of England. Harmondsworth: Penguin Books. ISBN 0-14-0710-34-5.
- "Building Materials and Construction: Stone". An Inventory of Historical Monuments in the Town of Stamford. RCHM. 1977. pp. 64–69.
