= Stamford and Essendine Railway =

The Stamford and Essendine Railway was built to connect Stamford, Lincolnshire, in England, to the nearby Great Northern Railway. It was a short line, and it opened in 1856. It was not commercially successful, and the directors sought a means of connecting Stamford directly to Peterborough. This was the Sibson Extension, opened from Stamford to Wansford in 1867, but the junction there did not facilitate through running to Peterborough, and the Sibson Extension was even less successful than the first line. It was closed in 1929.

The company had a separate Stamford station from the Midland Railway's through station, and after nationalisation the Essendine trains ran into the MR station, from 1957. Nevertheless the Essendine line was greatly loss-making and the passenger service closed in 1959, followed by the complete closure of the line in 1963..

== Railways at Stamford ==
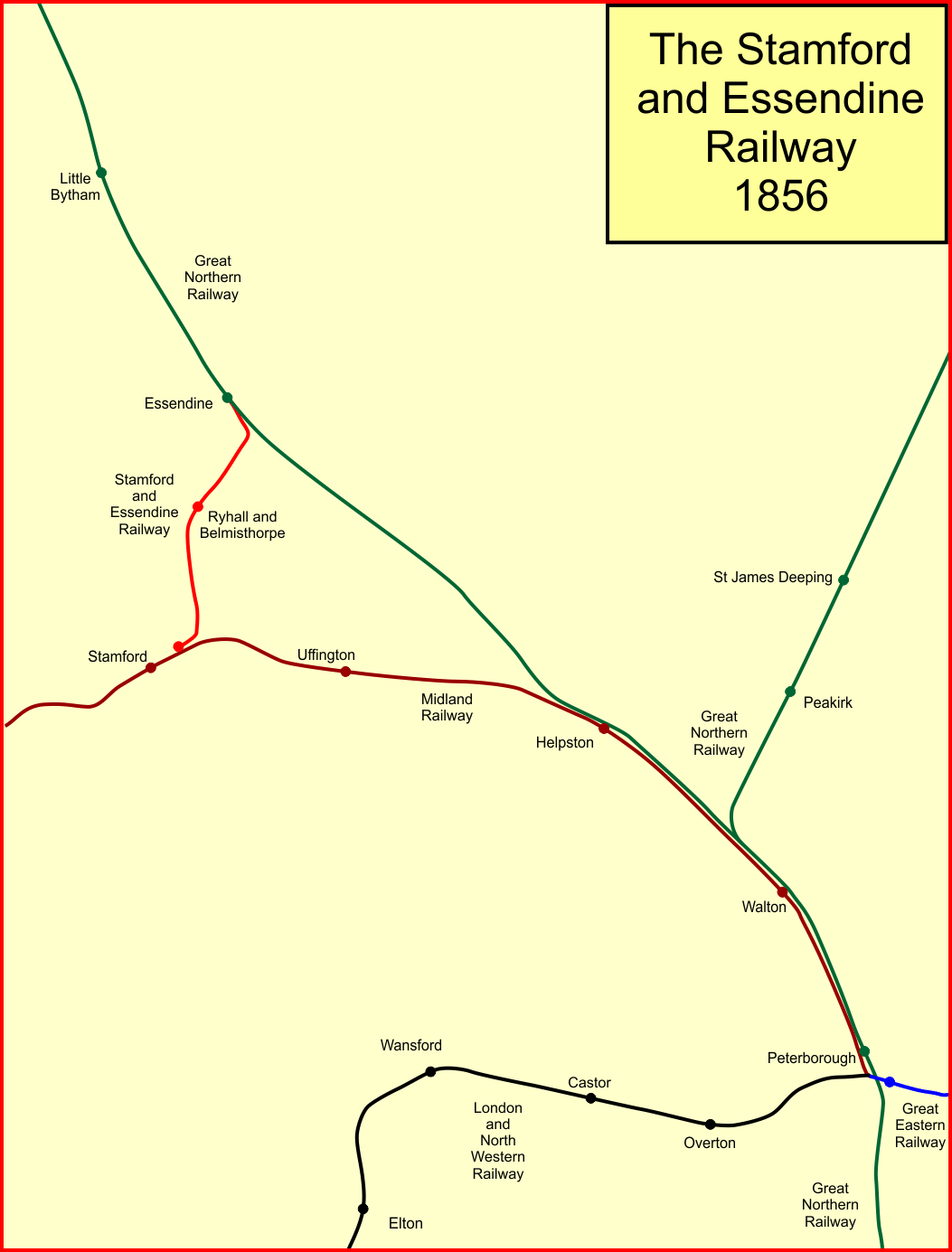
The Stamford and Essendine Railway

In the nineteenth century Stamford was an important market town on the Great North Road. The Midland Railway opened its line from Melton Mowbray to Stamford on 20 March 1848 for goods traffic and 19 June 1848 for passengers. The line was soon extended to Peterborough. The Great Northern Railway was not so early to reach the area, but it opened its main line from Werrington Junction, north of Peterborough, to Retford on 15 July 1852 for goods traffic and 1 August 1852 for passengers.

The Great Northern Railway main line, destined to be the important trunk route forming the East Coast Main Line, by-passed Stamford, although it originally planned to run through the town. Goodman, writing in 1908, said that it "seems inexplicable that the main line... should be so planned as to pass by a prosperous market town of 8,000 inhabitants at a distance of barely 4 miles". Seeing themselves at a disadvantage, local people, led by the Marquis of Exeter, formed the idea of making their own branch line from Stamford to the GNR main line at Essendine. The Marquis of Exeter had his seat at Burghley House in Stamford.

== Stamford and Essendine Railway authorised ==
Stamford and Essendine Railway Act 1853
- Act of Parliament
- Parliament of the United Kingdom
- Long title: An Act for making a Railway from Stamford Baron in the County of Northampton to the Great Northern Railway at Essendine in the County of Rutland, and for other Purposes connected therewith.
- Citation: 16 & 17 Vict. c. cxcix

Dates
- Royal assent: 15 August 1853

Text of statute as originally enacted

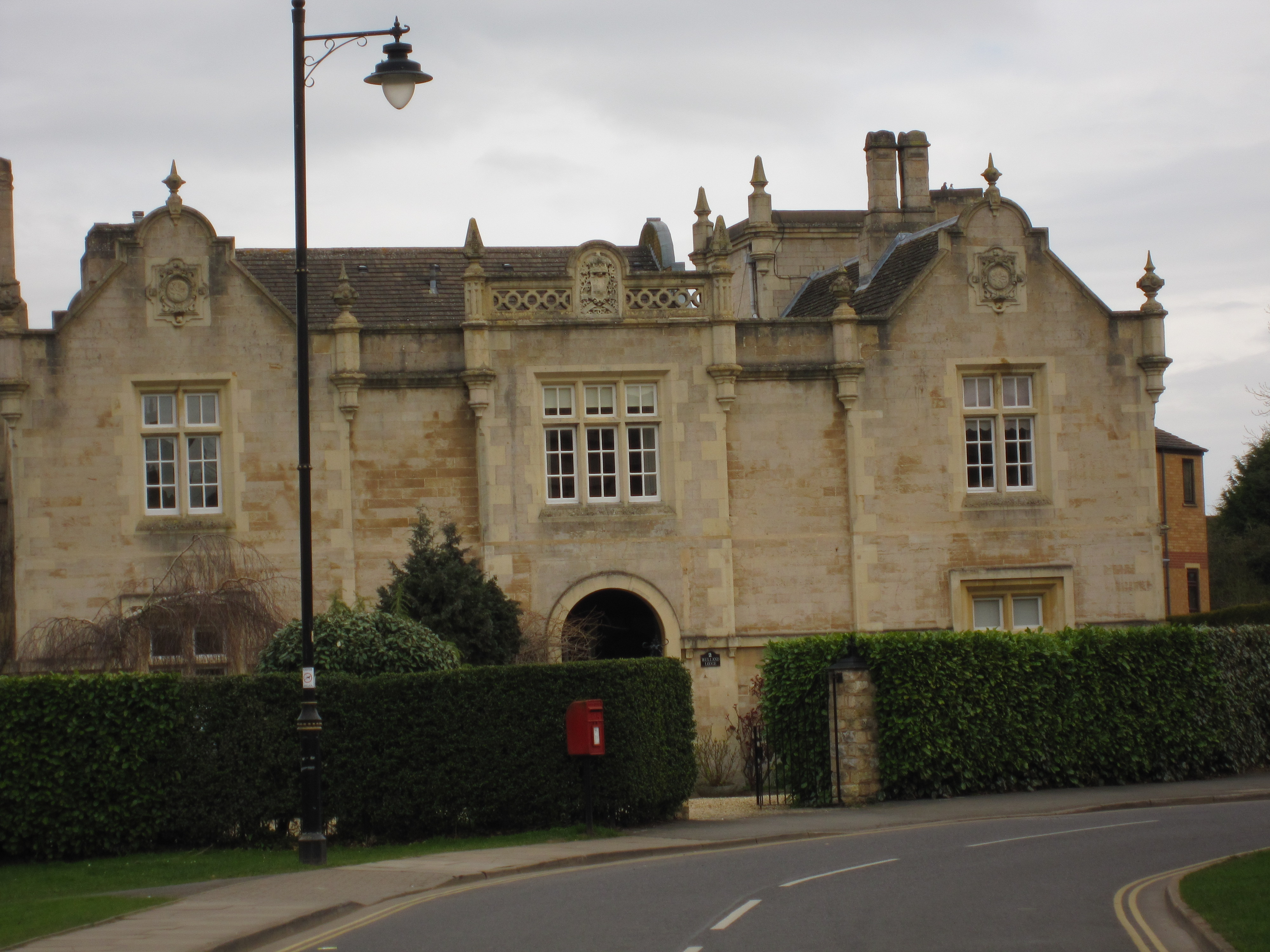
Stamford S&ER station frontage

The scheme for a railway connection went to the 1853 parliamentary session, and the Stamford and Essendine Railway obtained authorisation in the Stamford and Essendine Railway Act 1853 (16 & 17 Vict. c. cxcix) on 15 August 1853. The Midland Railway bitterly opposed the scheme. Their hostility was magnified because the act of Parliament authorised the S&ER to make a connection to the Midland Railway station at Stamford and to secure running powers into it. The capital of the S&ER was £50,000.

A contract for the construction was let on 21 August 1854. Midland Railway hostility had been so violent during the process of land acquisition that for the time being the S&ER company decided to make an independent station at Stamford to avoid use of the Midland Railway station.

In 1856 the line was considered to be ready for opening, and Lt. Col. George Wynne made a visit for the purpose of the Board of Trade inspection, which was required for passenger operation. He visited on 12 September 1856, but he refused the authorisation for a number of reasons; chief among these was that the ballast under sleepers was only 3 to 7 inches in depth at trial holes he had taken out. The company made the required improvements and Wynne visited again on 14 October 1856; this time he was satisfied, and approval for the opening of the line was given.

== Opening ==
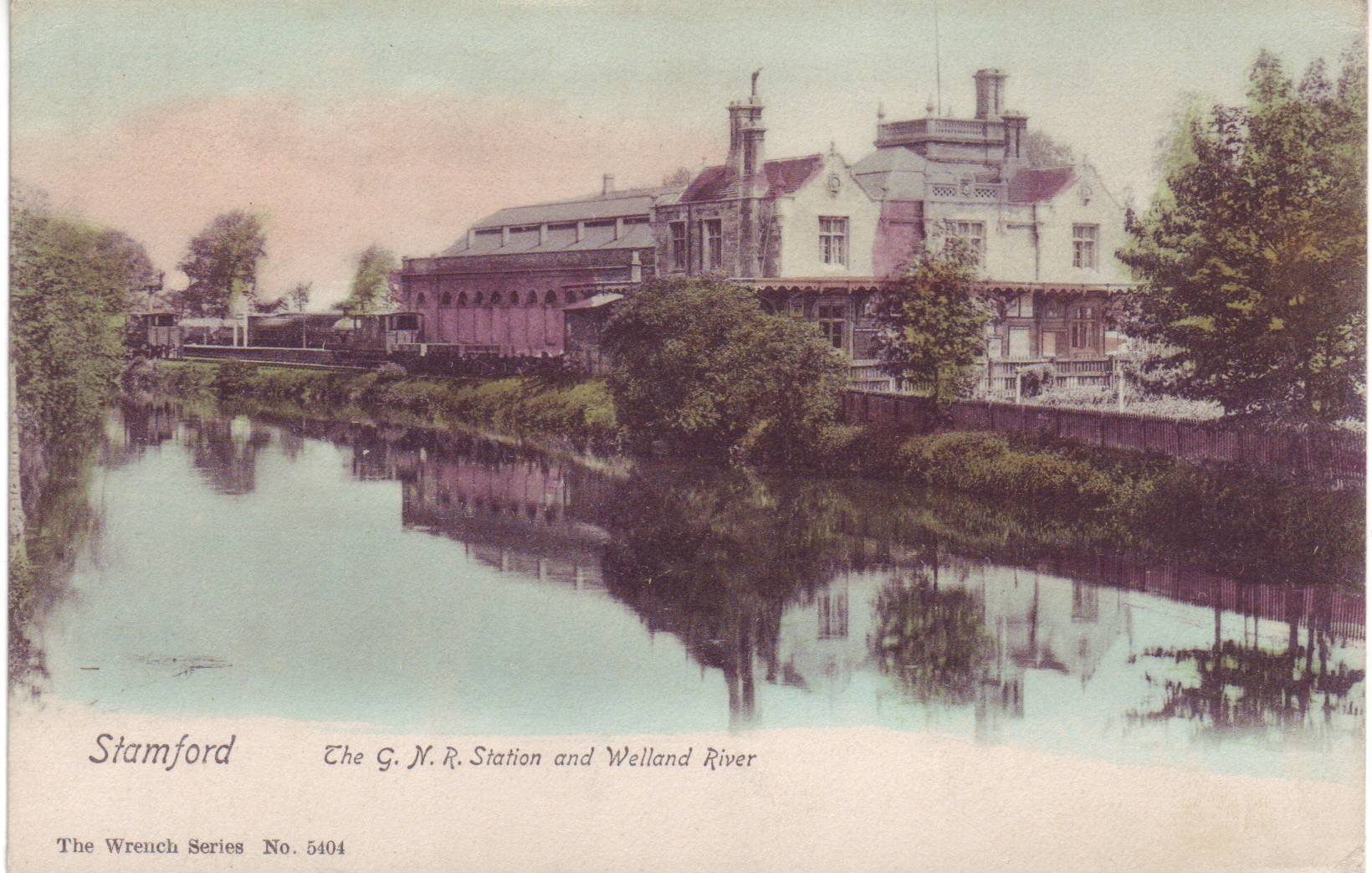
Stamford GNR station

The line opened for traffic on 1 November 1856; the train service was four trains each way daily; the Great Northern Railway had agreed to work the line for 50% of gross income. The line ran to Essendine station on the GNR main line; the junction faced northwards there. There were no intermediate stations, and the line was single; Stamford passenger trains used a bay platform at Essendine.

At this period the small town of Bourne also sought a connection to the Great Northern Railway. The Bourn and Essendine Railway was incorporated by an act of Parliament, the Bourn and Essendine Railway Act 1857 (20 & 21 Vict. c. cxii), of 12 August 1857, with capital of £48,000.

S&ER receipts for the half year ending December 1858 were reported to be £1,418. This was considered satisfactory, and encouraged the directors, led by the Marquis of Exeter, to plan the provision of double track. The formation had been made for double track, and a second track was quickly laid, except for a distance of 400 yards approaching Essendine: there was not enough space close to the junction with the GNR. Nevertheless the Board of Trade were requested to inspect the line for opening as a double track, even though the second track was not connected at Essendine, and no signalling had been provided for it. The directors were unable to state what method of safe working they proposed. The Board of Trade inspecting officer made three further visits in 1859; in every case he was unable to authorise opening of the second track, and eventually it was removed, and the proposal forgotten.

The Bourn and Essendine Railway opened for traffic on 16 May 1860, with intermediate stations at Braceborough Spa and Thurlby. Its junction at Essendine also faced northwards, like the S&ER junction, but on the east side of the GNR main line. It had been contemplated that through trains could be run from Stamford to Bourne and on to Spalding. However the junctions at Essendine were such that the Stamford line and the Bourne line entered bay platforms on their respective sides of the GNR main line, and through running would have involved a backshunt crossing all the GNR tracks. That was ruled out by the GNR as unsafe and likely to cause delay to main line running. An alternative proposed was for the Bourne line to enter Essendine from the south directly to the S&ER platform, but it would still need to cross all the GNR lines, and that too was unacceptable operationally.

== Sibson extension ==
Passengers travelling from Stamford to London found that taking Midland Railway trains to Peterborough and changing there was more convenient than changing at Essendine. There were more connections available at Peterborough. This led the S&ER to consider construction of an independent line to Peterborough, but this would have been unaffordable, running alongside the hostile Midland Railway all the way. As an alternative the S&ER considered building a line from Stamford southward to Wansford, forming a junction there with the London and North Western Railway (LNWR) line from Oundle to Peterborough. (Note: If this was intended to attract Stamford to London passengers away from the Midland route to Peterborough, it is difficult to see how it could have been successful. The LNWR trains ran into the GER station at Peterborough, not the GNR station, and running powers for S&ER trains to Peterborough were not granted. Accordingly passengers from Stamford to London using the route would have had to change trains at Wansford, and change stations at Peterborough.)

A bill was presented in the 1862 session; the issue of the connection to the Midland Railway station at Stamford was also included. The Midland Railway offered such determined opposition that the whole bill was thrown out. At this time the Marquis of Exeter offered to sell the S&ER line to the GNR for £100,000; this was more than the assessed capital value of the line and the offer was refused.

The Bourn and Essendine Railway was faring badly financially, and the GNR threatened to stop working it on the grounds that they were losing money, but the working charge was increased to 60%, and they agreed to continue. The GNR absorbed the almost-worthless Bourn and Essendine Railway Company by the Great Northern Railway (Lincoln to Bourn) Act 1864 (27 & 28 Vict. c. ccxlii) of 16 May 1864.

Stamford and Essendine Railway (Sibson Extension) Act 1864
- Act of Parliament
- Parliament of the United Kingdom
- Long title: An Act to authorize the Stamford and Essendine Railway Company to make a Railway from their Railway to join the Northampton and Peterborough Branch of the London and North-western Railway; and for other Purposes.
- Citation: 27 & 28 Vict. c. ccxx

Dates
- Royal assent: 25 July 1864

Text of statute as originally enacted

The S&ER extension to Wansford became known as the Sibson Extension, and was presented in Parliament once again. It fared better this time; the issue of the connection at Stamford to the Midland Railway had been omitted and as a result the Midland Railway did not oppose the scheme. Royal assent was given to the Stamford and Essendine Railway (Sibson Extension) Act 1864 (27 & 28 Vict. c. ccxx) on 25 July 1864; an additional share issue of £75,000 was authorised to pay for the work. Running powers to Wansford LNWR station were granted under the act, but onwards to Peterborough was not included. Moreover if the junction at Essendine had wrongly been formed facing away from Peterborough, the error was repeated at Wansford, where the junction faced away from Peterborough.

The GNR had agreed to work the S&ER original main line for 50% of income, but (as on the Bourne line) the work was loss-making to them. The original working agreement was due to expire on 1 November 1864, and the GNR demanded a higher payment, but the Marquis of Exeter said that the S&ER would work the line themselves, and gave notice that they would do so from the due date. GNR asked £10 annually for use of Essendine station.

== Connecting the Midland Railway at Stamford ==
In 1866 the Midland and Eastern Railway was formed by amalgamation of the Lynn and Sutton Bridge Railway and the Spalding and Bourn Railway. The intention had been to build westward from Bourne to Saxby to join the Midland Railway there (as was done later in forming the Midland and Great Northern Joint Railway). The GNR opposed this scheme, and in negotiation offered the Midland through running at Essendine over the Bourn and Essendine Railway, which by then had been over by the GNR) and the S&ER. The Midland Railway Company sought this access eastwards, and found that it was in its own interest to facilitate the junction at Stamford. There was a technical issue: the MR were concerned that the end of the junction tracks would be on an S&ER viaduct considered to be in poor condition, and they insisted on its conversion to an embankment. That work was done and the junction came into use on 1 July 1867. The difficulty over through running at Essendine was also overcome, as the GNR ran three mixed trains daily from Stamford to Lynn via Bourne and Spalding.

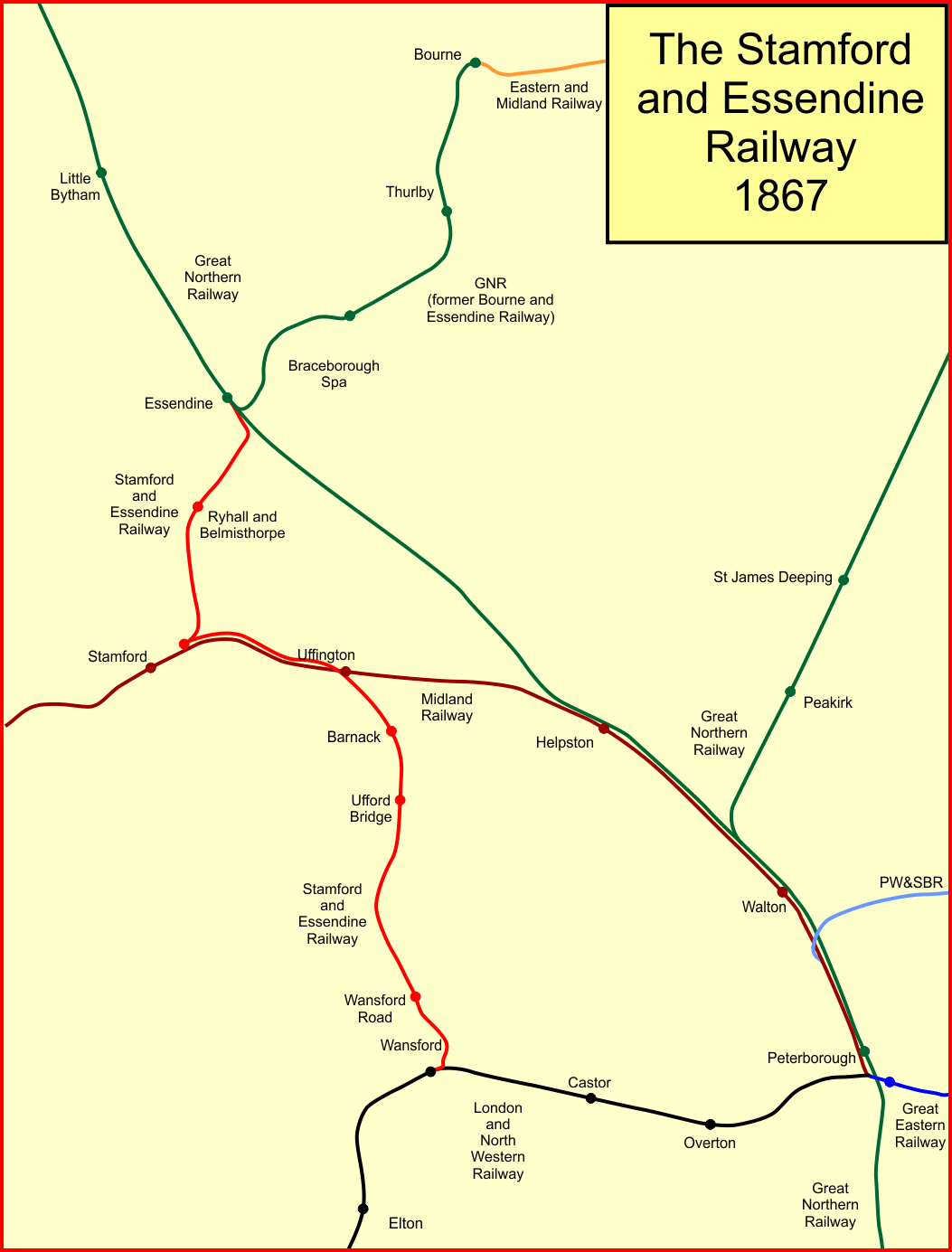
The Stamford and Essendine Railway in 1867

The Sibson Extension was inspected by Captain H. W. Tyler on 3 July 1867, and the following day he looked at the Stamford connection. He considered that several minor issues were still unresolved, and more seriously there was no statement of the intended method of working the Sibson line, so he declined permission to open to passenger operation.

He made a second visit on 19 July 1867, but he was still not satisfied, mainly due to signalling shortcomings. He made a third visit on 2 August 1867, and this time he approved the opening, which was "officially opened" on 8 August 1867 (probably a ceremonial opening) and a public opening to passengers and goods took place on 9 August 1867; there were five trains each way.

== Withdrawal from Wansford ==
The receipts of the Sibson Extension were very disappointing, and the S&ER considered the charges made by the LNWR for the use of Wansford station to be excessive. The LNWR was intransigent and the S&ER decided to stop using Wansford station and use a new temporary station north of the junction, on its own line. The new station, named Sibson, opened on 1 January 1870, and S&ER trains ceased to run on to Wansford.

Once again the Marquis of Exeter attempted to sell the line to the GNR, but they were still not interested. They agreed to work the line for 50% of receipts in the case of the Essendine line, and 70% in the case of the Sibson line. This was agreed and they resumed working the line from 1 January 1872.

In December 1877 the Sibson connection had been reinstated and was stated to be ready for inspection; Col. Yolland visited for the necessary Board of Trade inspection, but he was dissatisfied with the signalling arrangements. Remedial work was carried out and everything was ready at the end of February 1878. Trains ran through from 1 March 1878, and the Sibson station closed.

== Lease to the Great Northern Railway ==
The GNR agreed a lease of the S&ER lines on 15 December 1893; it was to be a lease in perpetuity from 1 January 1894 at a rent of £3,000 for ten years, and then £3,500 annually. The lease was authorised by the Great Northern Railway Act 1894 (57 & 58 Vict. c. lxxv).

By 1914 the Essendine line had fifteen return trains daily, while the Sibson Extension had eight.

The "grouping" of the railways took place in 1923, following the Railways Act 1921. The Great Northern Railway was a constituent of the new London and North Eastern Railway (LNER). There were complications due to the terms of the perpetual lease, which contained a clause that elevated the lease charge if the line was connected to a through route. The S&ER shareholders got LNER 4% debentures "at good value".

The LNER later reviewed the profitability of the Stamford to Wansford line: it was operating at a loss of £2,956 a year, and closure was proposed. The decision was ratified and the line closed to all traffic on 29 June 1929.

The railways were nationalised in 1948, and the LNER lines as well as the former Midland Railway lines became part of British Railways. Under unified management the duplication of the Stamford stations was reviewed; it was obvious that the separate Stamford East station was wasteful, and it was closed to passengers on 4 March 1957. Passenger trains were handled at the Midland Railway station.

== Closure ==
Passenger usage of the Stamford to Essendine line was very light; most passengers who used the line changed trains at Essendine to reach Peterborough or London, and it was obvious that those passengers could use the former Midland line to Peterborough instead. Closure to passengers was proposed, and the passenger service ceased on 15 June 1959. On the same day Essendine and other intermediate stations on the former GNR main line closed.

The East Yard at Stamford closed to goods on 4 March 1963.

== Topography ==
=== Original line ===
- Essendine; opened 15 July 1852; closed 15 June 1959;
- Ryhall and Belmisthorpe; opened 1 November 1856; closed 15 June 1959;
- Stamford; opened 1 November 1856; renamed Stamford East 1950; closed 4 March 1957; sometimes known as Water Street;
- The line continued to provide freight service until 4 March 1963.

=== Sibson extension ===
- Stamford (above);
- Barnack; opened 9 August 1867; closed 1 July 1929;
- Ufford Bridge; opened 9 August 1867; closed 1 July 1929;
- Wansford Road; opened 9 August 1867; closed 1 July 1929;
- Sibson; opened 1 January 1870; closed 1 March 1878;
- Wansford; LNWR station; opened 2 June 1845; closed 1 July 1957.

Ufford Bridge station was described as a Halt, and until the advent of railmotors in 1905 was the only halt on the Great Northern Railway.
