= Bourne–Morton Canal =

Canal in Lincolnshire, England

- Interactive map of Bourne–Morton Canal
- Location: Bourne, Lincolnshire
- Country: United Kingdom
- Coordinates: 52°46′15″N 0°21′33″W (SW end); 52°48′21″N 0°17′27″W (NE end)

Specifications
- Length: 6.5 km (4.0 miles)
- Status: infilled

History
- Former names: Old Ea

The Bourne–Morton Canal is a Roman-era former canal and archaeological feature located to the north-east of Bourne, Lincolnshire in the UK. In maps and documents, it is sometimes referred to as the Old Ea. It was a 6.5-kilometre (4.0 mi) artificial waterway linking the dry ground at Bourne to either the coast near Pinchbeck or a navigable estuary in the area.

Excavation at Cross Drove in the 1990s suggests that the canal was around 2.6 metres (8 ft 6 in) deep at high tide, 6 m wide at the base, and 10 to 12 metres wide at the surface. It appears to date back to Roman times, although very little is known. Despite the extensive agricultural reworking of the area, the route can still be traced with cropmarks, which are straight between Bourne and Morton Fen.

The path of the canal can be traced between the line of modern Spalding Road from near Queens Bridge at Eastgate to the bottom of Meadow Drove follows the southern bank of the alignment, which can then be observed across the fields as cropmarks. Several farm buildings in Barnes Drove and Morton Fen lie alongside the alignment, causing speculation about the antiquity of their sites.

There is also speculation concerning the location of the south-western end of the canal. It would make little sense to stop short of the dry ground to the west of the Car Dyke or the Roman road in Bourne, and a linear projection of Spalding Road would reach Austerby, crossing the modern Eau south of the Abbey Lawn. This area has been extensively re-engineered for the Bourne Castle, Abbey and railway station, and is now occupied by 20th-century housing.
