= Haconby =

Village and civil parish in Lincolnshire, England

Coordinates: 52.81°N 0.36°W

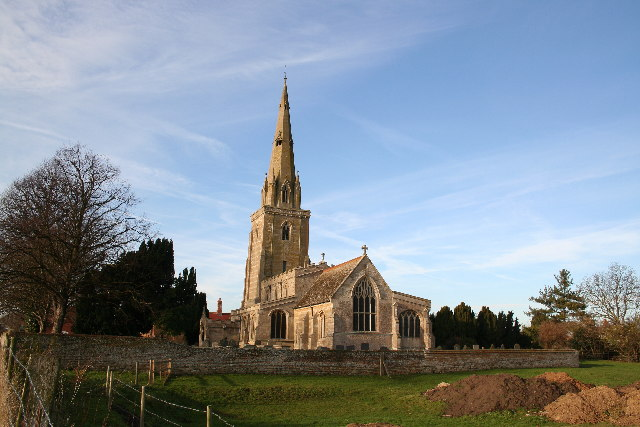
- St Andrew's Church, Haconby

- Location within Lincolnshire
- Population: 448
- OS grid reference: TF1025
  - London: 90 mi (140 km) S
- District: South Kesteven
- Shire county: Lincolnshire
- Region: East Midlands
- Country: England
- Sovereign state: United Kingdom
- Post town: BOURNE
- Postcode district: PE10
- Dialling code: 01778
- Police: Lincolnshire
- Fire: Lincolnshire
- Ambulance: East Midlands
- UK Parliament: Grantham and Bourne

Haconby is a village and civil parish in the South Kesteven district of Lincolnshire, England. The population of the civil parish at the 2001 census was 448 increasing to 532 at the 2011 census. It is situated on the western edge of the Lincolnshire Fens, 3 miles (5 km) north from Bourne.

== History ==
The village name means Haakon's village. The village church is dedicated to St Andrew. On 27 February 2008 the parish church spire was damaged by the 2008 Lincolnshire earthquake.

A former railway line passed north to south close to the east of the village – the Sleaford branch of the Great Northern Railway, which closed to passengers in 1930 and to freight in 1964. A Roman road, King Street, (from Bourne to just south of Ancaster) passes through the western part of the parish, just west of Stainfield. There was an Iron Age or Roman town near Stainfield.

Stainfield Spa, 1.5 miles (2.4 km) to the west of the village, is a chalybeate spring discovered in 1720 by Edward Greathead of Lincoln.

== Geography ==
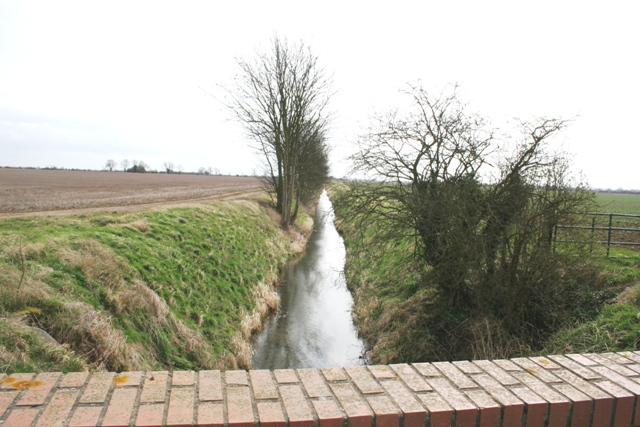
Car Dyke at Haconby

Haconby is situated just off the A15. Two miles (3.2 km) to the west is Stainfield, part of the civil parish. To the south of the village is Hacconby Hall.

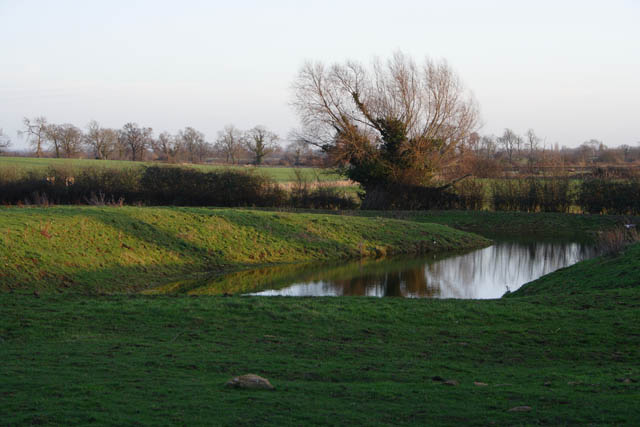
Stainfield Spa

The civil parish extends northwards to just north of the A15-B1177 junction, skirting the southern edge of Dunsby Hall Farm. The parish boundary extends due east, along the Hacconby Lode drain over Hacconby Fen, following Hacconby Drove to the south. To the north is the parish of Dunsby and Dunsby Fen. It reaches the South Forty-Foot Drain. The parish boundary (also with Pinchbeck and South Holland) follows this drain for just under a mile south. It then follows Lane Dike due west which crosses the Car Dyke just north of Cardyke Farm. The parish boundary crosses the A15 next to a transmitter and extends westwards to reach the north of Spring Wood, where it meets the large parish of Edenham. Just south of Thorny Wood it meets the parish of Dunsby. The parish boundary follows the southern edge of Dunsby Wood, crossing the Stainfield–Kirkby Underwood road just north of Stainfield Spa.

== Community ==
There are no amenities in the village other than the local public house, the Hare and Hounds on West Road. The nearest post office and shops are in the adjacent village of Morton to the south.

The primary school closed in the 1970s.

The civil parish covers the villages of Haconby and Stainfield. It is part of the Ringstone in Aveland group of the Deanery of Beltisloe, Diocese of Lincoln. The vicar was the Rev Dr Lynda Pugh between 2012 and 2018. The incumbent is the Revd Neil Bullen. Local democracy is provided by Haconby and Stainfield Parish Council.
