= Orrm =

Homilist and Augustinian canon

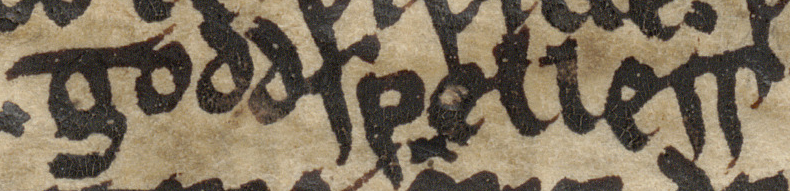
Orrm's handwriting in the Ormulum: Bodleian Library, MS. Junius 1, fol 3r.

Orrm, also known as Orrmin (Late Old English pronunciation: [ˈɔrˠmin]; fl. 1150s–80s), was an Augustinian canon from south Lincolnshire who wrote the Ormulum, a collection of verse homilies that is the oldest English autograph and one of the most significant records of Middle English. His work is a successful example of homiletics translating Latin learning to balance the needs of his fellow canons, who likely spoke Anglo-Norman French, with those of lay English-speaking audiences.

== Name ==
Orrm names himself at the end of the work's dedication: Icc was þær þær i crisstnedd was Orrmin bi name nemmnedd (Ded. 323–24: 'Where I was christened, I was named Orrmin by name'). This name derives from Old Norse, meaning worm, serpent or dragon. With the suffix of "myn" for "man" (hence "Orrmin"), it was a common name throughout the Danelaw area of England. At the start of the preface, the author identifies himself again, using a different spelling of his name: "Orrm". The metre dictated the choice between each of the two forms of the name.

The title of the collection, Ormulum, is modelled after the Latin word speculum ("mirror"), so popular in the title of medieval Latin non-fiction works that the term speculum literature is used for the genre.

The Danish name is not unexpected, as the language of the Ormulum, an East Midlands dialect, is of the Danelaw. It includes numerous Old Norse phrases (particularly doublets, where an English and Old Norse term are co-joined), but there are very few French influences on Orrm's language.

== Place and dates of activity ==
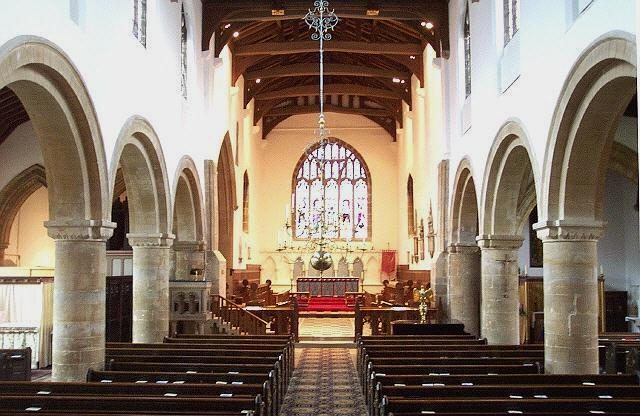
Bourne Abbey in Lincolnshire, where the Ormulum may have been composed.

According to the work's dedication, Orrm wrote the Ormulum at the behest of Brother Walter, who was his brother both affterr þe flæshess kinde (biologically, "after the flesh's kind") and as a fellow Augustinian canon. With this information, and the evidence of the dialect of the text, it is possible to propose a place of origin with reasonable certainty.

Some scholars, from a suggestion by Henry Bradley, have regarded the likely origin as Elsham Priory in north Lincolnshire. In the mid-1990s, it became widely accepted that Orrm wrote in the Bourne Abbey in Bourne, Lincolnshire. Two additional pieces of evidence support this conjecture: firstly, Arrouaisian canons established the abbey in 1138, and secondly, the work includes dedicatory prayers to Peter and Paul, the patrons of Bourne Abbey. The Arrouaisian rule was largely that of Augustine; its houses often are loosely referred to as Augustinian.

Orrm's dates of activity are not known. From palaeographic evidence, Orrm may have begun the work as early as 1150 and worked on it until the 1180s.
