= Austerby =

Former village in Lincolnshire

Coordinates: 52.7637°N 0.3712°W

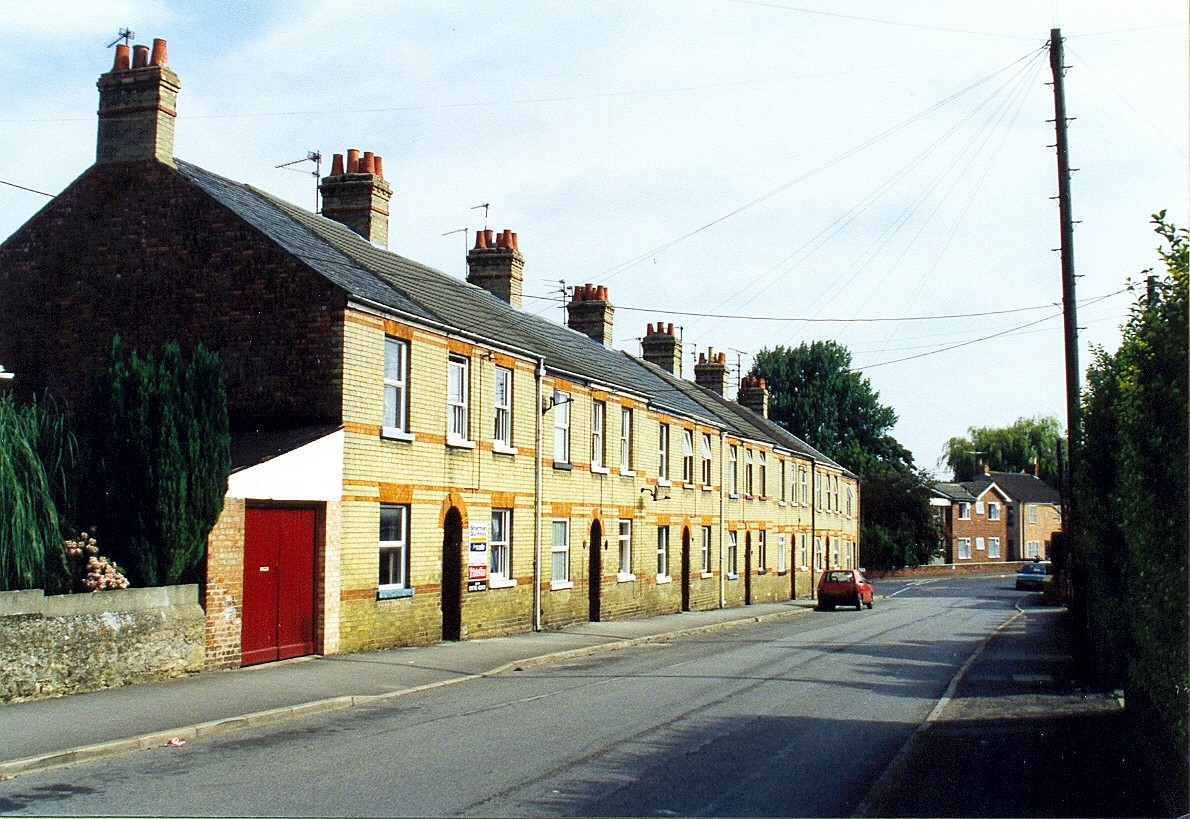
- Houses in Austerby

- Location within Lincolnshire
- OS grid reference: TF100197
  - London: 90 mi (140 km) S
- Civil parish: Bourne
- District: South Kesteven
- Shire county: Lincolnshire
- Region: East Midlands
- Country: England
- Sovereign state: United Kingdom
- Post town: BOURNE
- Postcode district: PE10
- Dialling code: 01778
- Police: Lincolnshire
- Fire: Lincolnshire
- Ambulance: East Midlands
- UK Parliament: Grantham and Bourne

Austerby is a suburb and street in Bourne, Lincolnshire. While formerly considered a separate village, gradually it was absorbed into Bourne as the town grew. Today, Bourne Austerby is a local government ward, with a total population of 8,038 in the 2021 census.

== Name ==
In has been suggested that Austerby derives from the Old Norse 'austarr', which means easterly, and the Old Danish 'by', which means village or farmstead. Alternatively the former part of the name might derive from Austr. Austerby was mentioned in the Domesday Book, and was later recorded in the Pipe Rolls of 1167 as 'Astrebi', in the Lincolnshire Assize Rolls of 1206 as Oustreby, and in the Calendar of Charter Rolls of 1327 as 'Oustirby'.

Arfth Wenth, a location described as being reached by the Bourne Fen, may have been located near Austerby.

== History ==
=== Mediaeval ===
It was suggested by local historian J. J. Davies that during the Danelaw, the Vikings sacrificed to Austr at Austerby. In its early history, Austerby was likely little more than a farmstead situated to the south-east of Bourne, and probably had a fen-based economy. It had become, by the 12th century, part of the broader Bourne community. In 1486 it was noted in a Feet of Fines.

Two large pits containing pottery and kiln waste, dating to the 15th to 17th century, were uncovered at 33 Austerby in 2006.

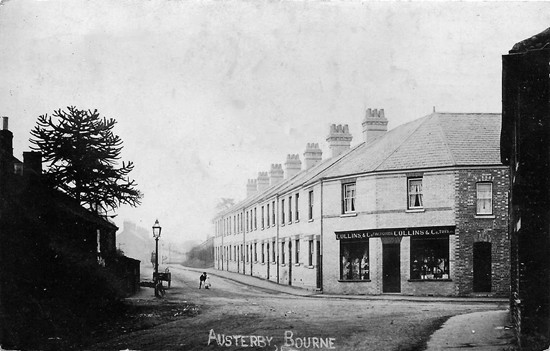
Austerby in 1908, viewed from the east

=== Victorian ===
The railway from Bourne to Spalding, which opened in 1866, ran through Austerby, where there was a level crossing on the street, as well as a footbridge over the tracks. There was a railway gatehouse at the crossing, built circa 1870, with whitewashed walls, and a slate roof. Once the railway closed, it became a private residence, and was subsequently modernised. During the railway age, Austerby hosted an inn called the Railway Tavern, although as the building predates the railway, being built in some time around 1720, it likely previously operated under another name. It was built in provincial Georgian style, double-fronted, and with sash windows, a pan-tiled roof, and with linked outbuildings. The inn closed in 1901, and the building has been a private residence since then.

A ladies' school was opened in 1867 at Austerby House, having moved from West Street in Bourne, run by Miss Gilbert. The school stayed open at least until 1905, when its pupils gave a concert at the Corn Exchange. In 1884, a substantial fair took place in Austerby, on a field owned by Mr Goodyear, a local farmer, which included swing-boats that were hired for the occasion. Two houses, 24 and 26, were built in the later Victorian period.

=== Modern ===
The railway was closed in 1959, and the land was subsequently sold off by British Rail in late 1966. In May 1955, 3 Austerby, a three storey brick and stone house, was set to be demolished. In 1956, a newly built block of council flats on the street was named Shillaker Court, after the farmhouse that had previously stood on that site. Austerby has been home to the Bourne detachment of the Lincolnshire Army Cadet Force since the early 1970s. After having been rebuilt in 2025 at a cost of £600,000, the new building was opened by the Lord-Lieutenant of Lincolnshire Toby Dennis.

Bourne Austerby is now the name of a local government ward, represented by 3 councillors, with a total population of 8,038 in the 2021 census.

== Buildings ==
=== Austerby Manor House ===
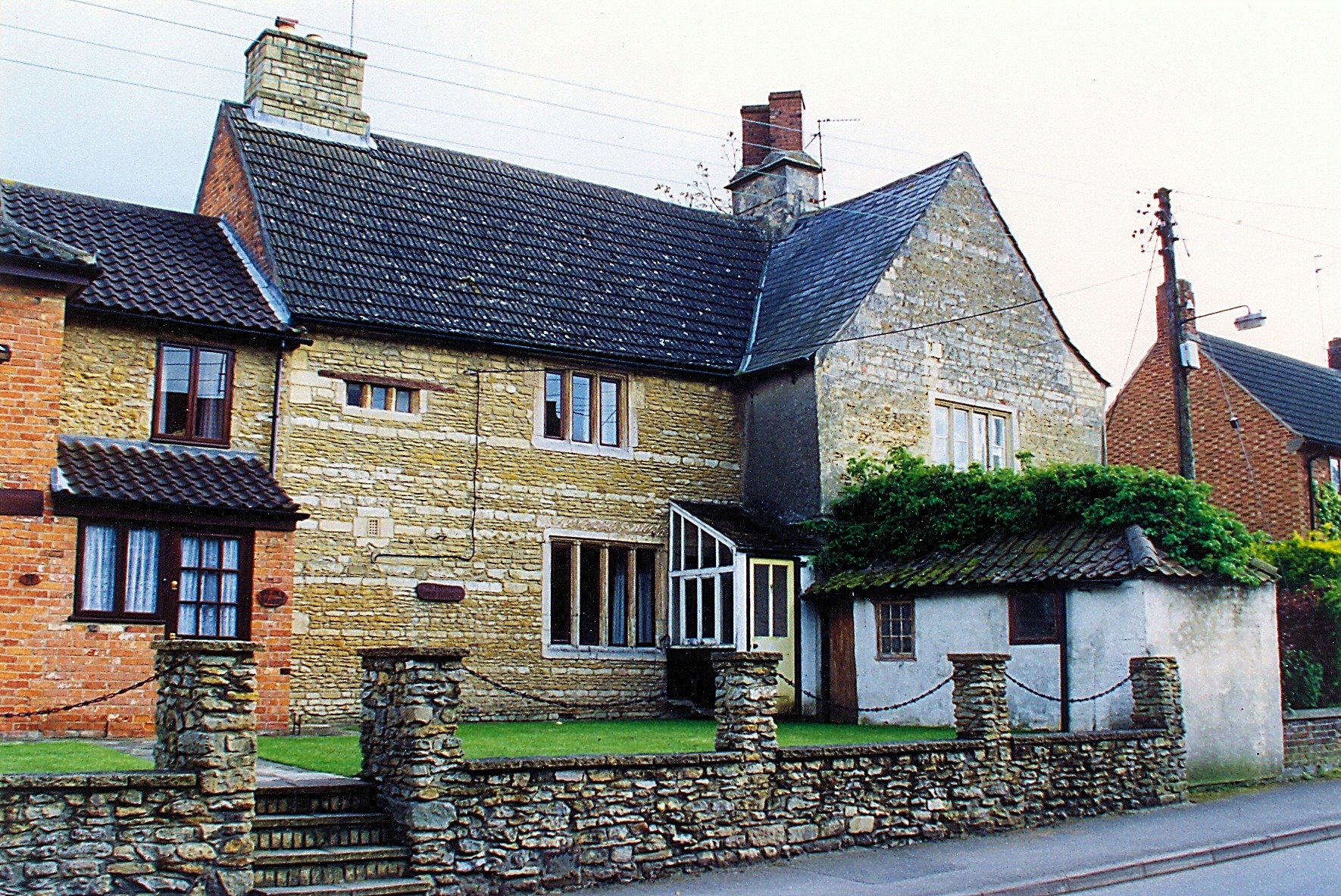
Austerby Manor House

Austerby Manor House is a late 16th century to early 17th century manor house in the estate of Bourne Abbey (and is sometimes stated as the residence of the abbot of Bourne). Following the dissolution of the monasteries, the manor eventually was inherited by the Trollope family (later raised to the Baronetage as the Trollope baronets). It was mentioned in Nikolaus Pevsner's Buildings of England series in the Lincolnshire volume.

For some time, continuing into the late 20th century, the eastern section of the house served as a bakery, then known as Austerby Bakery, giving that section the modern name 'The Old Bakehouse'. Presently it is subdivided into 2 properties, numbers 74 and 76, with additional residences in the former gardens south of it.

=== Austerby House ===
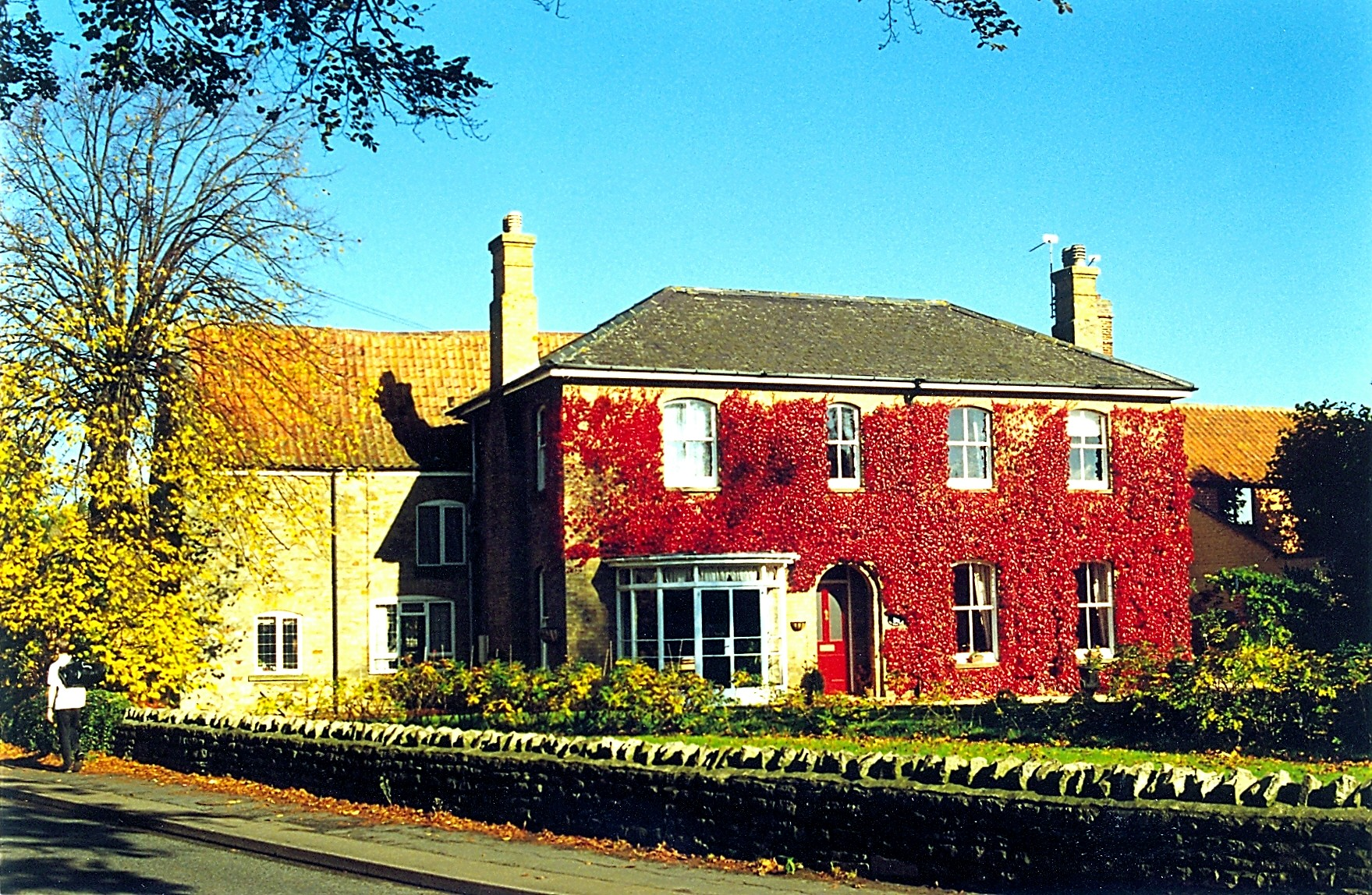
Austerby House

Austerby House is located at the point that Austerby joins with South Road, possibly originally functioning as a farmhouse, and is the only surviving part of this farm. The façade was modified to appear more gothic during the Victorian period. Today it is divided into three properties. The grounds of the house were sold off in the late 1980s/ early 1990s, and a cul-de-sac, Austerby Close, was built on the site, featuring 36 bungalows.

== Old Horse Chestnut Lane ==
A small lane coming off the south of Austerby, Old Horse Chestnut Lane (also called Old Chestnut Tree Lane) contains a Victorian red brick double fronted farmhouse, with bays on both storeys, a Victorian porch, and a pan-tiled roof. The land that belonged to the house was sold off in the 1990s, and several other houses were built on the road. At the end of the road there is a large brick house dating from the 1970s, which was used as a vicarage at one point.

A trackway running parallel to the east contains Lindon House, dating from at least 1906, also a red brick double fronted farmhouse, with a rear extension incorporating its former outbuildings, and featuring well-maintained gardens.

== In popular culture ==
In Georgette Heyer's novel Sylvester, or the Wicked Uncle, the character Lord Marlow has his country seat at Austerby.
