= Stainfield near Bourne =

Hamlet in the South Kesteven district of Lincolnshire, England

Coordinates: 52.811°N 0.400°W

Stainfield
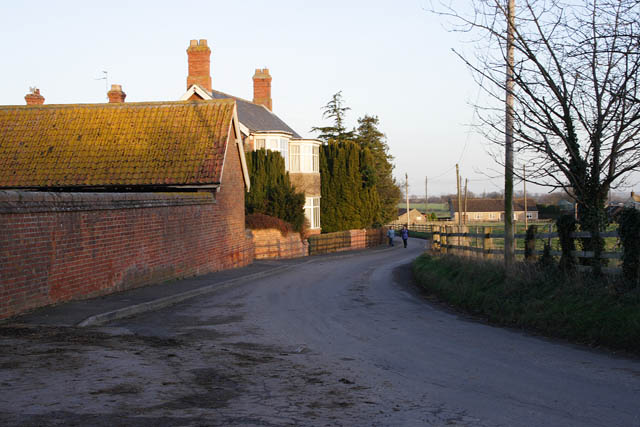
- Elsthorpe Road, Stainfield

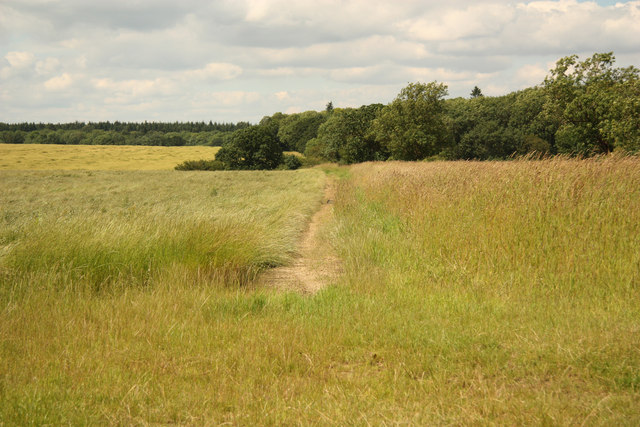
- The line of the Roman road

- Location within Lincolnshire
- OS grid reference: TF079250
  - London: 90 mi (140 km) S
- Civil parish: Haconby
- District: South Kesteven
- Shire county: Lincolnshire
- Region: East Midlands
- Country: England
- Sovereign state: United Kingdom
- Post town: BOURNE
- Postcode district: PE10
- Dialling code: 01778
- Police: Lincolnshire
- Fire: Lincolnshire
- Ambulance: East Midlands

Stainfield is a hamlet in the South Kesteven district of Lincolnshire, England. It is 3 miles (5 km) north from Bourne and 1 mile (1.6 km) west from the main A15 trunk road. The hamlet is in the civil parish of Haconby.

The name Stainfield (previously Stenfield) derives from "a stony clearing", from the Old Scandinavian 'steinn' and 'thveit'.

Stainfield is the site of a Roman station, a settlement established on account of local mineral springs, where Roman coins have been found. The King Street (Roman road) passes through the hamlet. The springs were used until the middle of the 18th century. There was once a chapel in the hamlet.

Stainfield is listed in the 1086 Domesday account as "Stainfelde" or "Steinfelde", in the manor of Haconby and Stainfield, and in the Aveland Hundred of Kesteven. The village contained 14 households, 13 villagers, 6 smallholders, 3 freemen and one priest. It comprised just over 3 ploughlands, a meadow of 40 acres (0.2 km^{2}), woodland of 80 acres (0.3 km^{2}), and one mill. The Lord in 1066 was Leofric. In 1086 the land was passed to Heppo the bowman, as Lord of the manor and Tenant-in-chief.

In 1933 Stainfield occupations included two farmers, one at the Manor farm, and three smallholders.
