= King Street (Roman road) =

Road from Peterborough to South Kesteven, England

Coordinates: 52.69170°N 0.36503°W

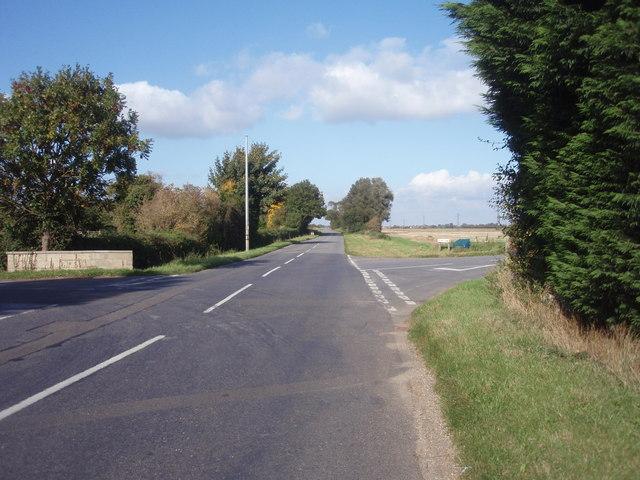
King street at Stowe, Lincolnshire

King Street is the name of a modern road on the line of a Roman road. It runs on a straight course in eastern England, between the City of Peterborough and South Kesteven in Lincolnshire. This English name has long been applied to the part which is still in use and which lies between Ailsworth Heath, in the south and Kate's Bridge, in the north. The old road continued to Bourne thence north-westwards to join Ermine Street south of Ancaster. This part of Ermine Street is called High Dike. In the south, King Street joined Ermine Street close to the River Nene, north of Durobrivae. The whole is I. D. Margary's Roman road number 26. (Margary pp. 232–234)

== Route ==
Archaeological work has revealed more of its length than is in use nowadays. Its course is regarded as having run from the boundary between Ailsworth and Castor, at the north-west corner of Normangate Field, just north of the River Nene (TL113980). This is where it left the Roman Ermine Street, north-west of Durobrivae in what was by the end of the 2nd century, an extensive industrial region producing tiles, metalwork and particularly, pottery.

To the south of this point, Ermine Street runs along the edge of The Fens; but to the north, lies further inland. King Street continued the course nearer the fen edge. While Ermine Street crossed the Welland near the natural ford at Stamford, King Street crosses at Lolham Bridges, which required more engineering.

At Kate's Bridge, the road crossed the River Glen. Until the 1820s the road still used the same crossing point despite the river's having moved from it at some time, probably well over a thousand years before. At Park Wood, the road appears to have come close to the Car Dyke but this is not well supported by evidence. From near Thurlby crossroads, the Roman line headed straight for the point at which Bourne Abbey was later built on.

In this length, there are points where the road seems to show in the modern landscape - for example, here. In the south, the modern road lies on the Roman one which continued through Elsea Wood and along the field boundary to its north. The Car Dyke lies to the east and the boundary between Elsea Wood and Math Wood seems to lie along the edge of the 2nd century road verge, which was cleared for security. The carriageway, the Car Dyke and the Math Wood boundary are all parallel here. When allowance is made for the now-missing outer works of the Car Dyke, the carriageway lies halfway between the other two features.

North of Bourne, little of the road is still in use but it has left its mark in the form of property boundaries and soil marks. This section is sometimes called the 'Long Hollow Road' because some of it runs along the bottom of the Long Hollow, a broad, shallow valley which is the upper part of the basin of the River East Glen.

From Bourne Abbey, it passed along Meadowgate, then by Cawthorpe to Clipseygap Lane, Hanthorpe and the Roman town at Stainfield. On the boulder clay ridge, it forms boundaries of woods before, in the East Glen valley, its line is picked up by a minor road at Hanby. It passed through the small Roman town at Sapperton and up the Long Hollow to Ropsley Heath whence it is more or less closely followed by a modern road to its junction with Ermine Street, a kilometre south of the Roman town of Ancaster. The road can be seen as a soil mark in The Long Hollow, just right of centre in this aerial photograph.

== Economic significance ==
Ermine Street was one of the strategic roads built in the 1st century, early in the period of the Roman occupation of Britannia. The features of King Street are consistent with its having formed part of a development of the region along with the Car Dyke, in the reign of Hadrian (117–138). It may well have been a result of his visit to Britannia in 122; fairly early in his reign and just after he had spent time sorting out the Limes between the Rhine and the Danube.

From Bourne, the tidal waterway known to archaeologists as the Bourne–Morton Canal and to the Middle Ages as the Old Ea, seems to have given Bourne access by boat to the sea, which lay only at the far end of Bourne North Fen. This meant that the products of the fen and coast such as salt and animal products such as fowls, meat, wool, fish and leather, could be brought across the fen which would normally have obstructed such traffic. This trade may be enough to explain the six Roman roads which radiated, directly or separating a short distance away, from the site. The Long Hollow Road and King Street were two of these, linking respectively, north and south, into the trunk road system by way of Ermine Street.

== Construction ==
In an archaeological excavation of the road at the southern edge of Bourne (TF098193), where it ran across a margin between Kellaways clay and the argillaceous (clayey) Kellaways sand, it was found that the construction of the carriageway had been done by digging two parallel shallow trenches into the subsoil and over-filling them with gravel ballast so as to form kerbs. Coarse sand was used to form the carriageway between them. This was a skilful use of the available materials as south of Kate's Bridge, the road passes over such minerals but little but rather friable Cornbrash is available near the excavated site. Clearly, this part of the road was constructed from the south, northwards and the materials carried along it. However, further north, in the Long Hollow, cornbrash from Sapperton TF019239, seems to have been used (Lane p. 23.) Again, the use is north of the source.

B.B. Simmons has spent much time excavating a roadside Roman town in the parish of Sapperton. His publications are listed in Lane's Ropsley and Humby book. The latter (plates 7a & b) also shows aerial photographs of the road as a soil mark around TF003367. This is the same mark as appears in photo 4 below.

== Aerial photographs ==
- King Street meets High Dyke (Ermine Street) near Ancaster.
- High Dike (Ermine Street) and King Street meet at the top of this photograph.
- Soil mark of King Street in the Long Hollow, near the A52.
- By Ropsley Heath quarry.
- The small roadside Roman town at Sapperton is centred on the long, green field.
- Road, soil marks and field boundaries at Lenton.
- Soil marks in the bare field at top centre and in the long field west of the airfield.
- Woodland boundaries on the chalky till near Kirkby Underwood.
- Property boundaries from Stainfield Roman town north-westwards.
- Stainfield Roman town and Clipseygap Lane, Hanthorpe.
- Clipseygap Lane and soil mark.
- The road, heading northwards turns aside from its Roman course as it meets Elsea Wood. The white patches towards the eastern edge of the field to the east of the road are the ploughed-out banks of the Car Dyke.
- The present road runs up the picture while the old turnpike bridge over the Glen is to its east. Until the 1820s the road northward descended from it to the tight turn seen under the crop in the pale field. McAdam took the tight bend out and in the 1970s, his new line was projected across a new bridge.
- The northern end of the modern King Street.
- The Maltby Drive houses are built on the Urns Farm early English cemetery, dated around the year 500. This was at the limit of the English advance into Britain at the time when the Dux Bellorum known as Arthur held the spread of settlement back for fifty years by his battles, beginning at the mouth of the Glen.
- Lolham Bridges. The diagonal brown feature is the London to Edinburgh railway.
- The junction between the two roads, Ermine Street and King Street, which are here, both defunct (just west of Station Road).

== See also ==
- Mareham Lane
