= Sylvester, or the Wicked Uncle =

1957 romance novel by Georgette Heyer

- First edition
- Author: Georgette Heyer
- Cover artist: Arthur Barbosa
- Language: English
- Genre: Regency, Romance
- Publisher: William Heinemann
- Publication date: 1957
- Publication place: United Kingdom
- Media type: Print (Hardback & Paperback)
- Pages: 309 pp

Sylvester, or the Wicked Uncle is a Regency romance novel by Georgette Heyer. First published by Heinemann, London and Putnam, New York in 1957, it is the story of intelligent and desperate Phoebe who ends up marrying the man she has run away from home to avoid, and whom she has caricatured as the villain in her novel. The book features gentle mockery of the Gothic novel genre and also features Heyer's characteristic strong heroine, with a desire for independence (in Phoebe's case, as a writer), who marries on her own terms. The story is set in 1817-1818.

== Plot summary ==
Sylvester, the wealthy Duke of Salford, is considering marriage. He travels to London to discuss the matter with his godmother, Lady Ingham, who tells him that her granddaughter Phoebe might suit Sylvester. He departs for a brief sojourn at the country house of Phoebe's father, Lord Marlow, where he makes the acquaintance of Phoebe and the Marlow family. Phoebe and Sylvester take an instant dislike to one another: Sylvester considers Phoebe to be gauche and plain, while Phoebe is disgusted at Sylvester's arrogance and lack of consideration for others.

Terrified of being made to marry Sylvester and getting no sympathy from her father, Phoebe calls upon a childhood friend, Tom Orde, to help her run away to live with her grandmother, Lady Ingham, in London. Phoebe is unaware that Lady Ingham is the person who suggested that Sylvester marry her.

Tom and Phoebe set off secretly for London, but their journey comes to an abrupt end due to an accident to their curricle. Phoebe, Tom and their horses find refuge at a wayside inn. Meanwhile, Sylvester has also escaped from the Marlows and is on his way back to London, together with his groom and personal friend Keighley, when he catches sight of the wreck of Tom's curricle by the roadside. As it is now snowing hard, they too stop at the inn to seek shelter. At first Phoebe is shocked and terrified at the sight of Sylvester, but after a very short while they are on fairly good terms and frequently share a joke with one another.

A few days later, when the thaw comes, Sylvester sends Phoebe in his own carriage on the remainder of her journey to Lady Ingham's house in London, with the landlady's daughter Alice as chaperone. By then Sylvester and Phoebe have become better acquainted. However, although they enjoy each other's company, they also disconcert and even annoy each other.

On arrival in London, Phoebe is warmly welcomed by Lady Ingham and takes up residence with her. Soon after this, Phoebe regularly encounters Sylvester at social functions, and they become friends. She also meets Lady Ianthe, the silly, credulous widow of Sylvester's twin brother Harry, who is convinced that Sylvester is evil because he is executing his brother's will exactly: Edmund, Harry and Ianthe's young son and Sylvester's heir, must live with Sylvester at the family home of Chance.

Phoebe is struck by the parallels between the real Sylvester and the arrogant parody of him in a book which she has written and which is about to be published anonymously. Due to the new and friendly relations between her and Sylvester, she attempts to change her manuscript, but her publishers say that it is too late to do so. When her novel The Lost Heir is published, it fascinates London because of its perfect caricatures of members of high society. Everyone is whispering and wondering who the author can be. Suspicion soon fastens on Phoebe, and the rumour quickly starts to spread.

Sylvester, having decided to scotch this rumour, is so hurt by Phoebe's portrayal of him that he insults Phoebe in public, which causes a scandal and confirms Phoebe as the author. Lady Ingham decides to take Phoebe away to France with Tom Orde as their escort. Unfortunately, Lady Ianthe and her new husband, foppish Sir Nugent Fotherby, are going to France on their honeymoon with Edmund, her son, from the same port. Lady Ianthe has got the idea of taking Edmund away to France from the plot in Phoebe's novel.

Phoebe tries to intervene and boards the schooner with Tom where they are 'kidnapped' by Fotherby, who orders the skipper to set sail. Edmund is sea-sick and Lady Ianthe is ill too, so Phoebe and Tom take over the care of the small child. Phoebe writes to Lady Ingham and Sylvester from France, but Sylvester catches up with them before he receives the letter. At first he is overjoyed to see Phoebe but then unjustly blames her for helping Lady Ianthe to kidnap Edmund. However, Sylvester needs Phoebe to look after Edmund on the journey back to England.

Sylvester complains to Phoebe about all the scrapes in which Phoebe has embroiled him and, in turn, Phoebe accuses Sylvester of ruining her reputation. Sylvester, having realised that he loves Phoebe, clumsily proposes marriage but Phoebe is outraged by the perceived sarcasm. Sylvester runs to his mother for help. She arranges to meet Phoebe to explain that Sylvester's arrogance arises from the grief he suffered after the loss of his twin brother; she also tells Phoebe how much he loves her. Sylvester is summoned and declares his love for Phoebe, upon which Phoebe is only too happy to accept his proposal of marriage.

== Characters ==
Sylvester Rayne, Duke of Salford - the 28-year-old hero, whose father died when he was 19; ducal estate is named Chance.

Miss Phoebe Marlow - the 19-year-old heroine, a débutante and secret writer, whose mother died when she was less than two weeks old; brought up by her father and stepmother.

Mr Thomas "Tom" Orde - Phoebe's 19-year-old childhood friend, neighbour, and surrogate brother; lives at the Manor House, the only child of the local Squire and his wife, Mr and Mrs Orde.

Elizabeth Rayne, Dowager Duchess of Salford - Sylvester's beloved, charming mother; a poet; an invalid, disabled by an arthritic illness and unable to walk unaided.

Dowager Lady Ingham - Sylvester's godmother and Phoebe's grandmother; in her mid-60s; mother to the late Verena Marlow (Phoebe's mother) and also to a son.

Lady Ianthe Rayne - widow of Sylvester's twin brother, Lord Henry Rayne ('Harry'), who died of an illness four years ago; officially known as "Lady Henry"; daughter of Lord and Lady Elvaston.

The Honourable Edmund Rayne - Lady Ianthe's six-year-old son and Sylvester's only nephew and heir; Sylvester is his sole guardian.

Sir Nugent Fotherby - a very wealthy but ridiculous and foolish dandy.

Button - currently Edmund's nurse, formerly Sylvester and Harry's nurse.

Lord Marlow - Phoebe's 53-year-old father, a weak, good-natured but unintelligent man famed for his excellent horsemanship in hunting circles; his country seat, Austerby, is 90 miles (about 145 kilometres) from London.

Constance, Lady Marlow - Phoebe's unkind and critical stepmother; mother of Phoebe's half-sisters Susan (15), Mary (13), Eliza, and Kitty.

Miss Sibylla "Sibby" Battery - the Marlows' gruff governess who is kind to Phoebe and her sisters; cousin to a junior partner in a publishing firm.

John Keighley - Sylvester's middle-aged groom since his childhood and personal friend.

Major and Mrs Newbury - Sylvester's favourite cousin and her husband, who live modestly in London.
