= St. Gilbert's Church, Bourne =

Catholic Church in Bourne, Lincolnshire, England

Coordinates: 52°46′16″N 0°22′41″W

St Gilbert's Catholic Church
- Church of St Gilbert of Sempringham
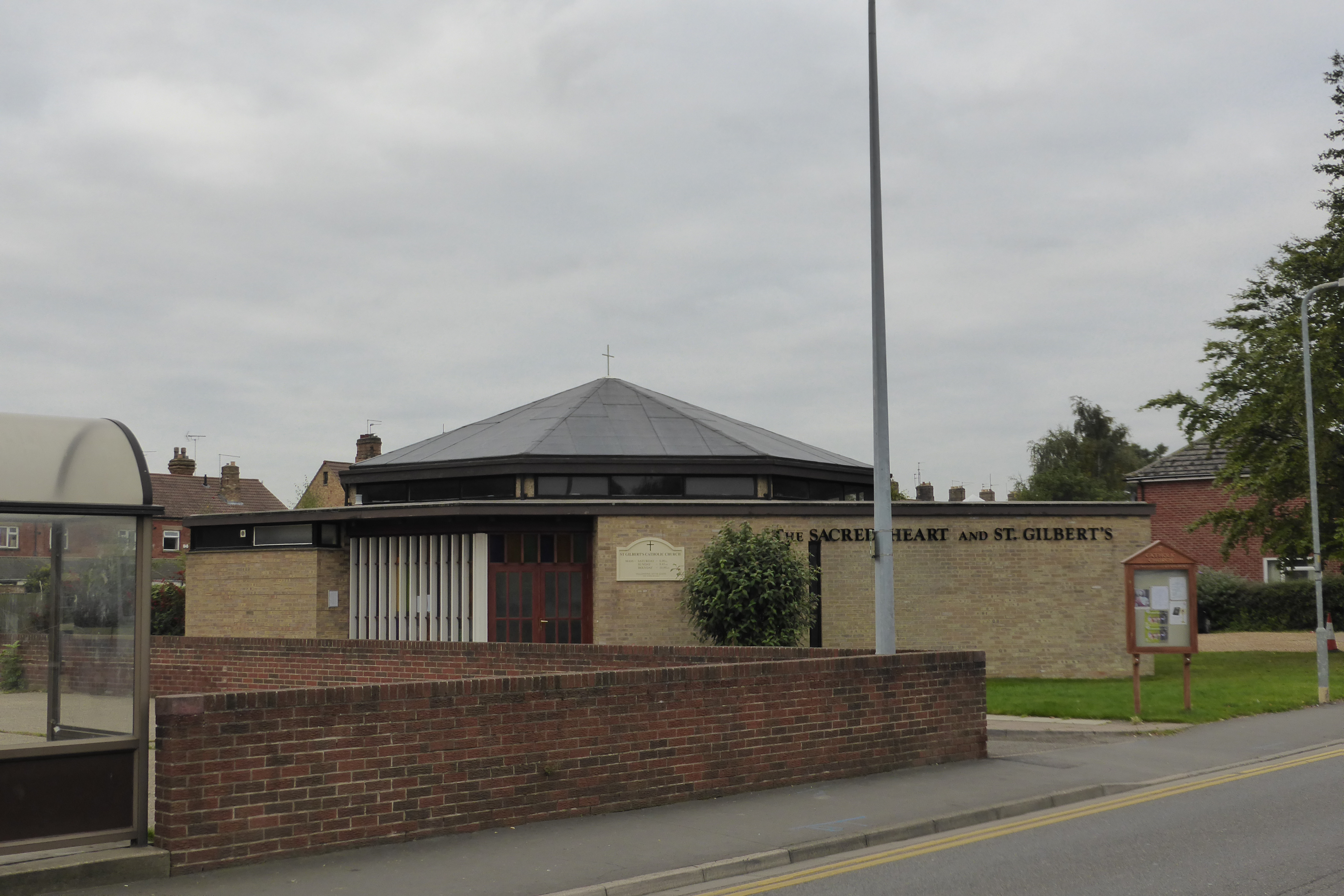
- Exterior of St Gilbert's Catholic Church, Bourne
- St Gilbert's Catholic Church
- OS grid reference: TF 09528 20510
- Location: St Gilbert's Road, Bourne, Lincolnshire
- Country: England
- Denomination: Roman Catholic
- Website: bourneanddeepingrc.org.uk

History
- Status: Parish church
- Founded: 1950 (temporary chapel)
- Dedication: St Gilbert of Sempringham
- Dedicated: December 1976
- Consecrated: December 1976

Architecture
- Functional status: Active
- Architect: Thomas E. Wilson
- Architectural type: Circular
- Completed: 1976

Specifications
- Capacity: 200

Administration
- Province: Westminster
- Diocese: Nottingham
- Deanery: Grantham
- Parish: Sacred Heart & St Gilbert's, Bourne and Our Lady of Lincoln & St Guthlac, Deeping St James

Clergy
- Bishop: Patrick McKinney

St. Gilbert's Catholic Church is a Roman Catholic parish church in Bourne, Lincolnshire, England. It forms part of the parish of the Sacred Heart and St Gilbert, within the Roman Catholic Diocese of Nottingham. The church, completed in 1976, is dedicated to Saint Gilbert of Sempringham, the only Englishman to have founded a monastic order. It is the principal centre of Catholic worship in the town of Bourne and serves as part of a joint parish with Our Lady of Lincoln and St. Guthlac Church, Deeping St James.

== History ==
Catholic worship in Bourne was re-established in the mid-20th century. In 1950, a temporary wooden hut on Exeter Street was acquired to serve as the town's first post-Reformation Catholic centre. The congregation remained small, but steady growth during the following decades led to plans for a permanent church building.

The current church on St. Gilbert's Road was constructed in 1976 to designs by the architect Thomas E. Wilson. It was one of the earliest completed buildings in the new residential development on St. Gilbert's Road and cost approximately £70,000 to complete.

The church was formally dedicated by James McGuinness, Bishop of Nottingham, in December 1976.

== Architecture ==
St. Gilbert's is a modern circular building designed with a dual-purpose layout: one side of the interior serves as the sanctuary and worship area, while the other functions as a parish hall for community and social events.

The building seats around 200 people. It has a plain brick exterior and is built low to the ground, mimicking 20th-century Catholic architecture trends in England. The church's proximity to Bourne's town bus station has occasionally led to its being mistaken for a public hall or café, a reflection of its unassuming exterior form.

== Dedication ==
The church is named after St. Gilbert of Sempringham (c. 1085 – c. 1189), founder of the Gilbertine Order and native of Lincolnshire. The dedication links the parish directly with a figure of local and historical significance to English monasticism.

== Parish and community ==
St. Gilbert's forms part of the Sacred Heart & St. Gilbert's, Bourne and Our Lady of Lincoln & St. Guthlac, Deeping St. James Parish, within the Diocese of Nottingham. The parish provides regular Sunday and weekday Masses, sacramental preparation, catechesis, and community activities. The building includes accessibility features such as wheelchair access, a loop system for the hearing impaired, and adapted facilities.

== Significance ==
It is the first permanent Catholic church in Bourne since the Reformation. It remains in service as a combined religious centre and social hall for people in Bourne.

== See also ==
- Roman Catholic Diocese of Nottingham
- St. Gilbert of Sempringham
- Catholic Church in England and Wales
