= Red Hall, Bourne =

Historic house in England

Red Hall
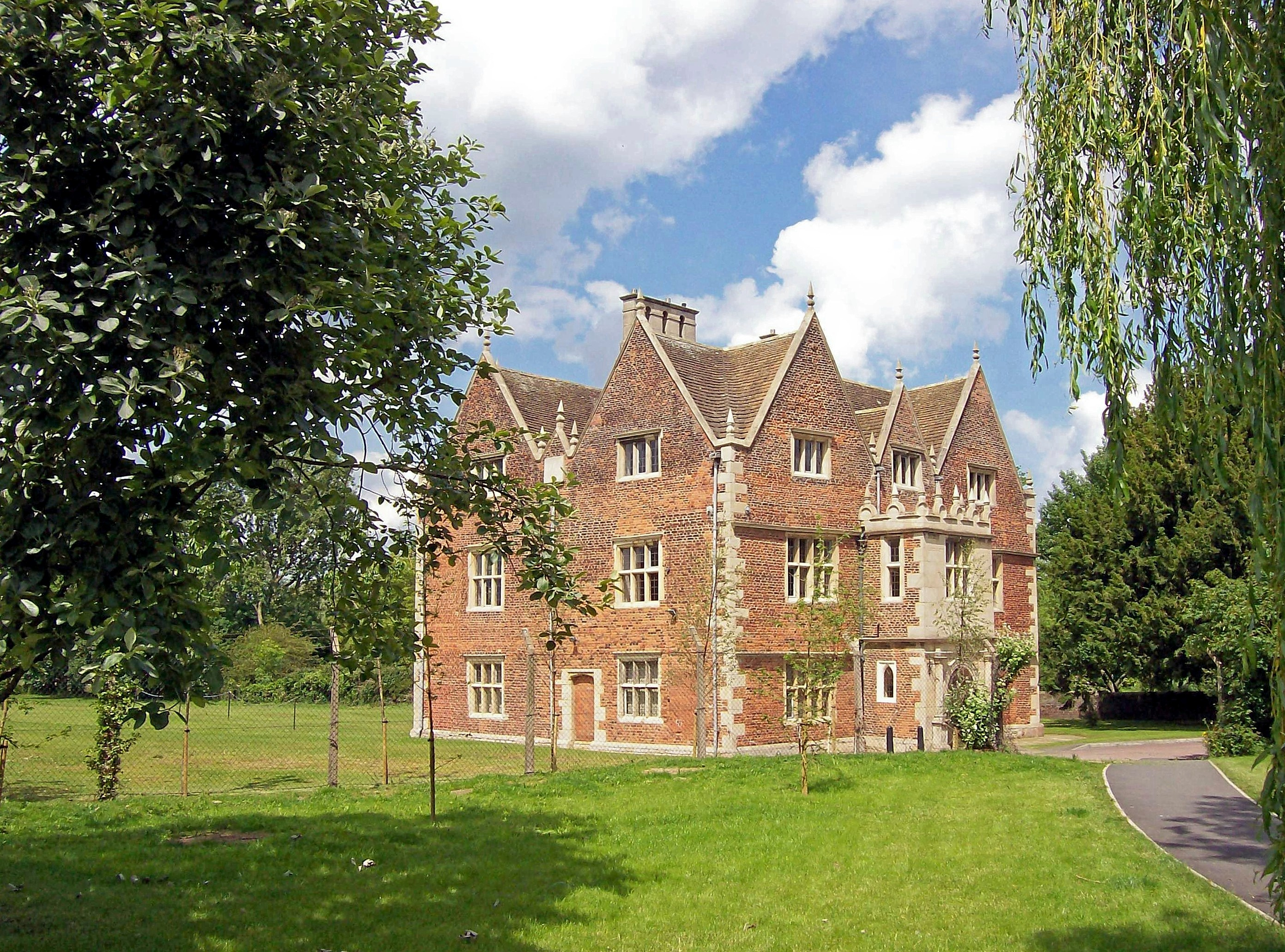
- The façade of the Red Hall

- Location within Lincolnshire
- 52°45′54″N 0°22′37″W
- Location: Bourne, Lincolnshire

History
- Built: 1600-1605

Listed Building – Grade II*
- Official name: Red Hall
- Designated: 2 May 1949
- Reference no.: 1259132

The Red Hall is a historic building in Bourne, Lincolnshire, located on South Street. Originally built as a home in 1605, remaining as one until 1836; it later served as a school and a railway booking office, now functioning as the offices for Bourne United Charities.

== History ==
=== Construction ===
The Red Hall was built in 1605 in Elizabethan style, for Gilbert Fisher, a grocer from London, who wished to live in the country. The architect is unknown, however, it has been suggested that it was John Thorpe. It was built from locally-made bricks, and featured significant gabling. It proved so expensive to build that Fisher died in debt, but his ancestors continued to live there for nearly a century. His grandson, also called Gilbert, handed the house over to trustees due to excessive debts, and it was sold to Richard Dixon, who died in 1721, leaving it to his wife Barbara, who sold it two years later to Richard Warwick. John Digby, born 1707, married Richard's daughter Elizabeth, which led to him taking ownership in 1730. The last of the Digbys was James Digby, who married his second wife Catherine, who was 37 years his junior, in 1792, and she created a fine garden around the house, and became known locally as a staunch Anglican. James died in 1811, leaving the Hall and a portion of his lands to his wife so that she could retain her comfortable lifestyle. Catherine herself died in 1836. At this point, under the terms of James' will, the property passed to his youngest sister, Henrietta Pauncefort. The Red Hall was subsequently leased, and became a private school for young ladies for about ten years, which remained open until 1859.

=== Railway Age ===
In 1859, when the Bourn and Essendine Railway arrived in Bourne, it was sold to them, and became a booking office, and accommodation for the stationmaster. In 1891, the Great Northern Railway planned to extend installations at Bourne, intending to demolish the building to make room for new sidings. This provoked backlash, and in response to a petition, the company directors went to Bourne to inspect the building, resulting in the decision being reversed, and an extensive refurbishment being carried out over several months, being completed by September 1892.

By 1920, it was split to accommodate three total families (of staff), however this still caused the company a loss of about £7 each year. The building survived one hundred years of trains passing without any serious damage.

=== Modern ===
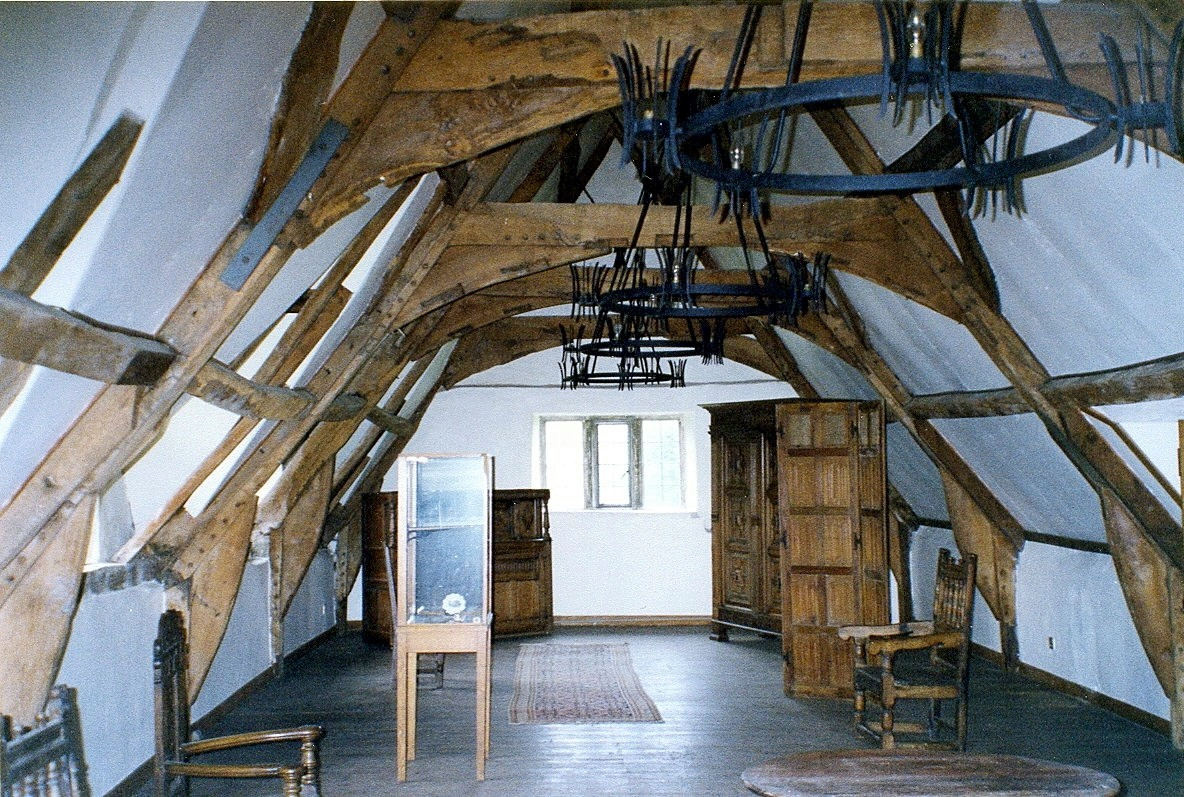
Long gallery on the top floor

In 1959, when the railway station closed, local councillors voted unanimously to demolish it. It was vacant until 1962, when Bourne United Charities acquired its freehold, and refurbished it. Although it was initiately promised that it would be opened as a museum and community centre, this was never carried out, and it was instead put into use as the charity's offices, although some rooms are available to be hired out for functions.

== In popular culture ==
There was a disproven theory that the house was used by Guy Fawkes and his co-conspirators during the Gunpowder Plot.

In 1996, it was featured in the television programme The Fortunes and Misfortunes of Moll Flanders, with filming taking place over three days in May of that year.
