= Cawthorpe =

Hamlet in Bourne, Lincolnshire, England

Coordinates: 52.784851°N 0.38253°W

- Location within Lincolnshire
- OS grid reference: TF091220
  - London: 85 mi (137 km) S
- Civil parish: Bourne
- District: South Kesteven
- Shire county: Lincolnshire
- Region: East Midlands
- Country: England
- Sovereign state: United Kingdom
- Post town: Bourne
- Postcode district: PE10
- Police: Lincolnshire
- Fire: Lincolnshire
- Ambulance: East Midlands
- UK Parliament: Grantham and Stamford

Cawthorpe is a hamlet in the civil parish of Bourne, in the South Kesteven district of Lincolnshire, England.

Cawthorpe holds four Grade II listed buildings: Cawthorpe Hall, Cawthorpe House, Ivy Nook cottage, and an 18th-century farmhouse.
