= Bourne Castle =

Former castle in Lincolnshire, England

Coordinates: 52.76561°N 0.37856°W

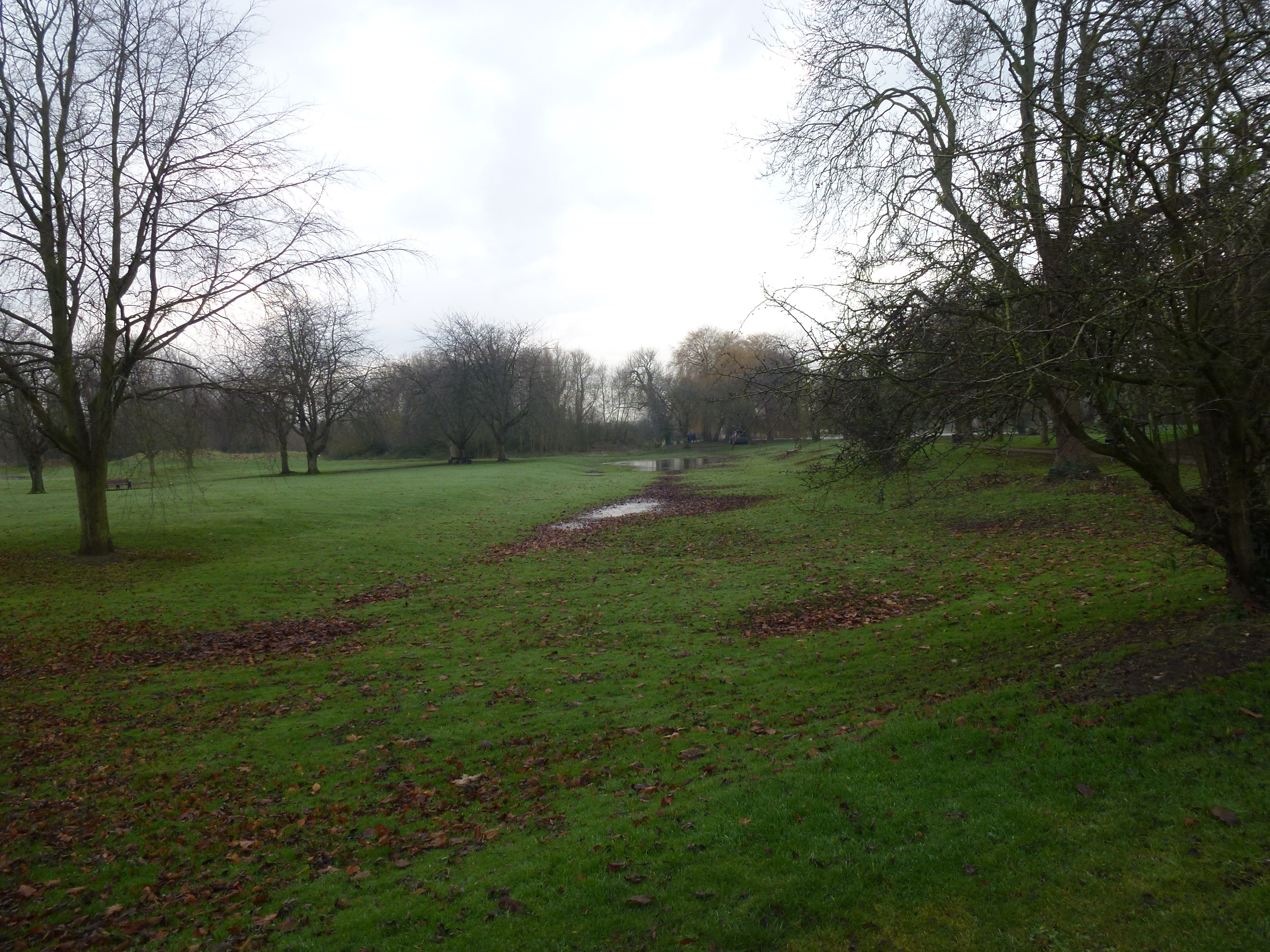
Remains of Bourne Castle in Wellhead Park.

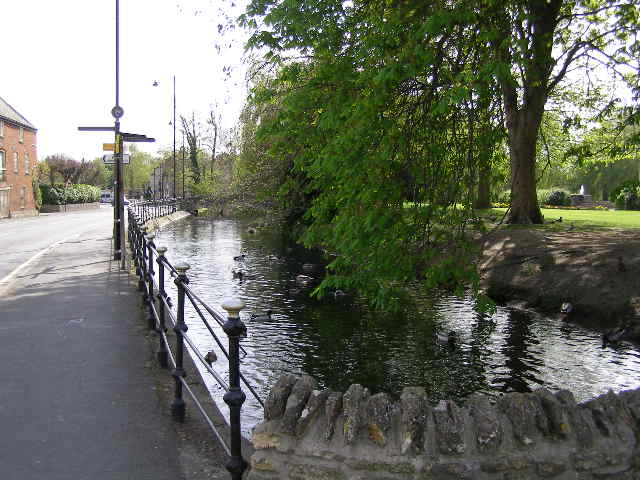
Bourne Eau in South Street.

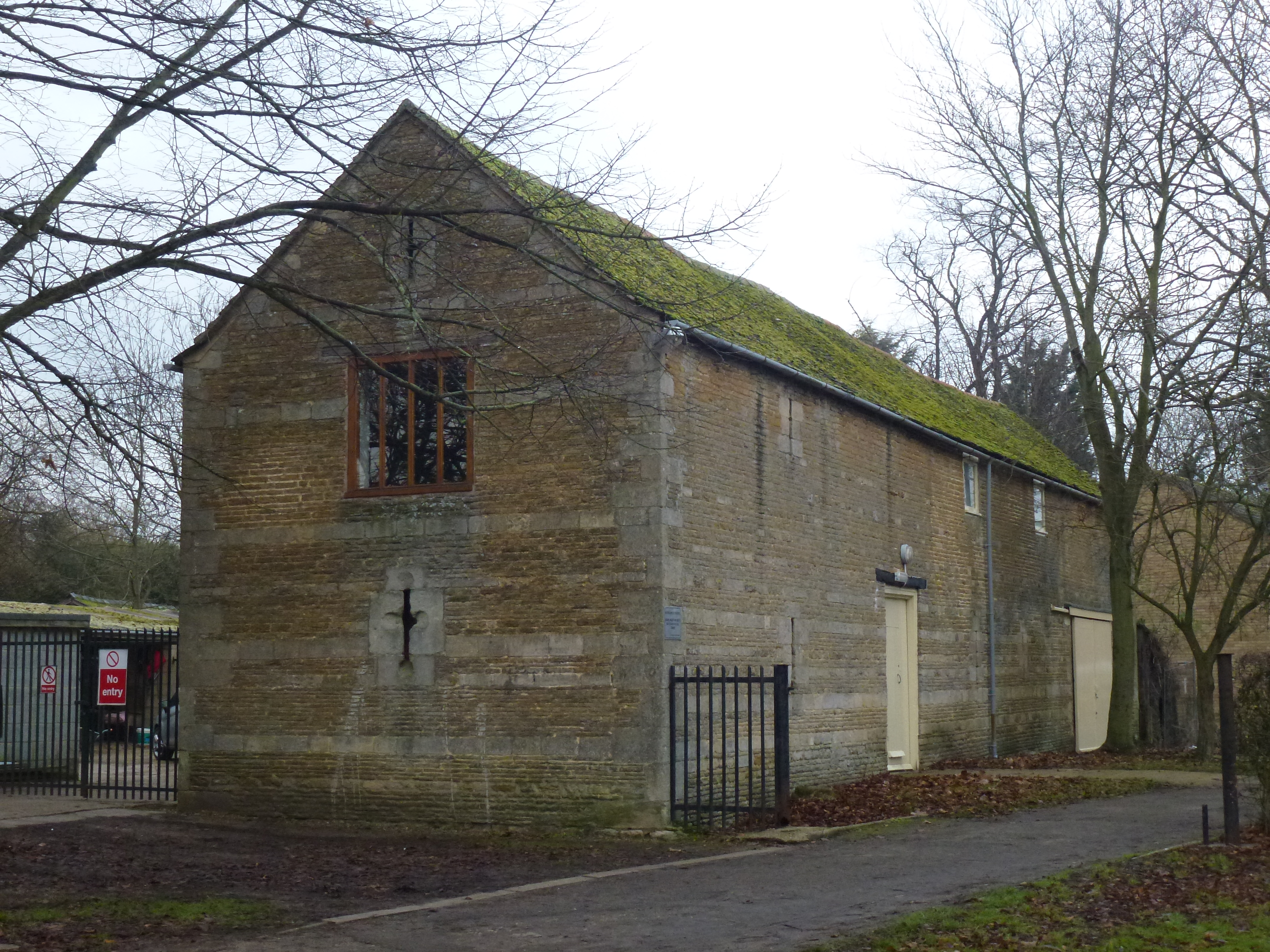
Shippon Barn Grade II listed building, possibly incorporating "arrow slit" windows from the former castle.

Bourne Castle was a castle in the market town of Bourne in southern Lincolnshire (grid reference TF095199).

A ringwork castle may have been established in Bourne soon after 1071 by Oger the Breton (largest landholder in Bourne in the 1086 Domesday account). The founding of a castle which may have been built on the old Saxon manor, or within the vicinity, may have came about from the rise and quashing of the Saxon rebellion led by the legendary Hereward ‘the Wake’. It is believed that the rebellion had been funded by the Saxon Earl Morcar.

The manor of Bourne passed into the hands of Ralph, Son of Oger, thence onto William and Richard Du Rullos (c1114).

At some point in its early life the castle transitioned into a motte and Bailey and built from timber. It is believed that the motte may have been added by Baldwin FitzGilbert (son of Gilbert Fitz Richard, of the De Clare family)(this Baldwin is not to be confused with the older Baldwin FitzGilbert aka Baldwin the Sheriff who built Oakhampton Castle).

The castle passed into the Wac family (Wake) through the marriage of Hugh Wac and Emma FitzBaldwin (c1141) upon the death of Baldwin FitzGilbert in 1154.

The castle transitioned from timber into a grander stone castle under the lordship of the Wake’s. The motte was reduced and a stone keep built. The keep had been surrounded by an semi-oval curtain wall which may have attached itself to the stone keep (donjon).

The castle (which is probably best described as a ‘farming castle’) was at its grandest under the lordship of the Wake’s.

An inventory of 1380 states there had been 413 houses, 2295 inhabitants, and about 200 serving in the castle of Bourne under the ladyship of Blanche Wake, wife of Thomas Wake.

In 1356 a couple from Irnham, Luttrell and Despenser were married at the chapel within the castle grounds.

The castle passed into the hands of the Holland family. Something drastic had happened in Bourne after 1380 because in 1443 it is recorded that over 140 messages lay in waste and ruinous. How the castle had fared during this time is anyone’s guess.

It must have been functional at some point in the mid 1400s because Margaret Beaufort, mother of Henry VII, lived there with Henry Stafford for five years.

The castle passed into the hands of Henry VIII illegitimate son, Henry FitzRoy, until his death in 1536.

The castle had been described by antiquarian John Leland as being hills and ditches (historians have used this to incorrectly state that the castle had been ruinous, yet Leland never mentions the state of the castle. He does however make mention that ‘every feoderie (servant) knows his place of service and that much service is done to the castle).

Another antiquarian by the name of Peaks describes the castle. This antiquarian may have seen the castle prior to Leland, in the early 1500s because he describes the donjon.

By the mid 1500s William Cecil, treasurer to Queen Elizabeth I, is in possession of the manor of Bourne. It is during the lordship of the Cecil family that we no longer hear about the castle.

There is a tradition that the castle had been destroyed in the. Civil war of 1645, but if this we cannot be certain.

A watching brief of 2002 dates activity from late 11th century early 12th century to the mid 17th century.

Traces of the enclosed mound and inner and outer moats (forming part of the Bourne Eau) are all that now survive, although a resistivity survey by Charles Hobbit in 2006, and a far greater survey initiated by local historian Steven Giullari in 2021 shows the footprint of the castle which can also be seen during long spells of extremely hot weather.

The land the castle occupied is now a park, known as the Wellhead Park, owned by the Bourne United Charities and is open to the public.

The first reference to Bourne Castle was in the 1179/80 Pipe Roll. There are other mentions of Bourne Castle throughout its history including the IPM (Inquisition Post Mortem) and the Close Rolls.
