= Elsham Priory =

Monastery in Lincolnshire, England

Coordinates: 53.5941°N 0.4461°W

Elsham Priory was an Augustinian monastery in Lincolnshire, England. The only surviving trace is a fishpond in the grounds of Elsham Hall. Beatrice d'Amundeville founded the monastery in the 12th century; it was dissolved in 1536.
