= Corn Exchange, Bourne =

Commercial building in Bourne, Lincolnshire, England

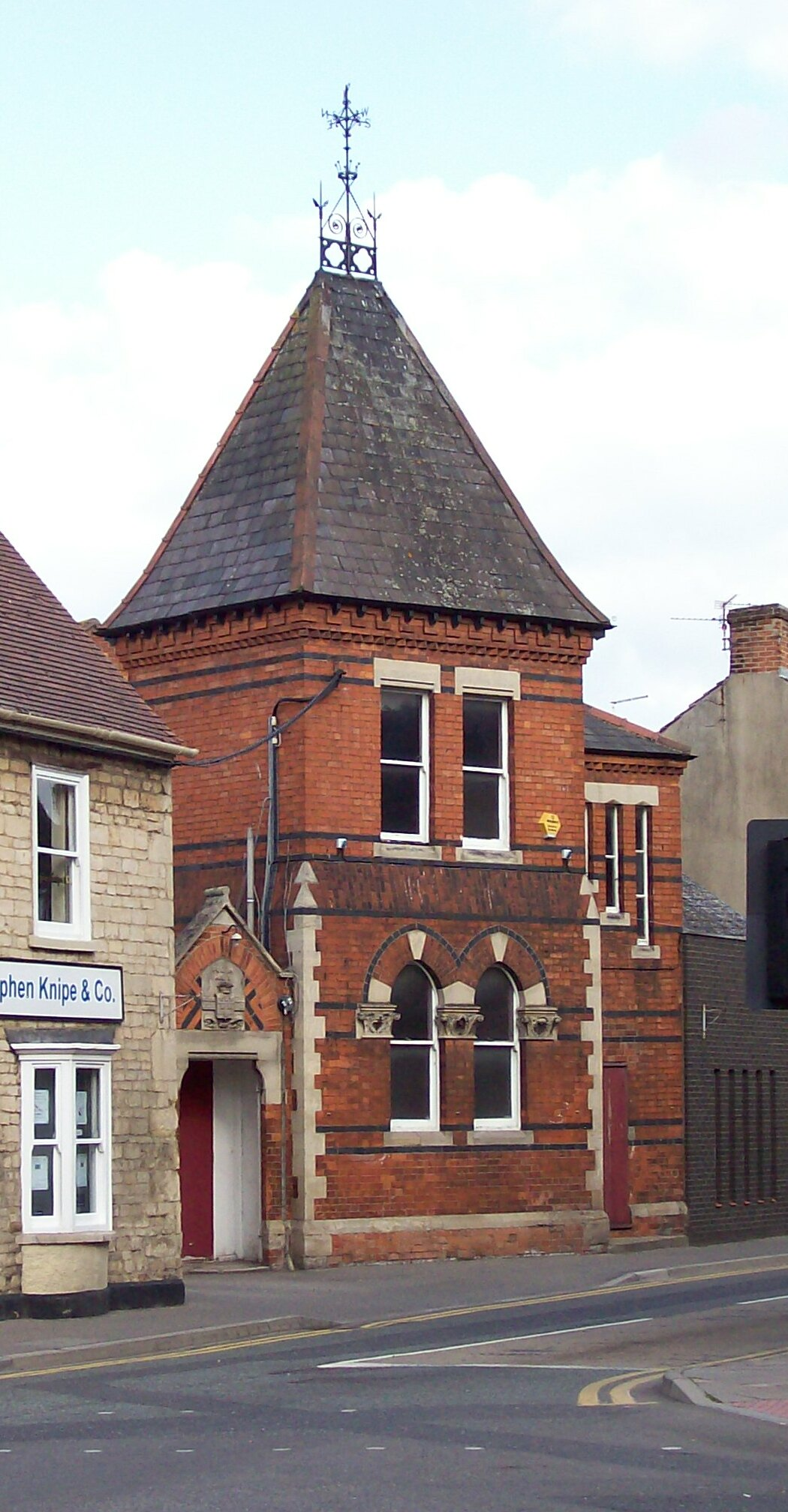
- Corn Exchange, Bourne

- Shown in Lincolnshire
- 52.7680°N 0.3766°W
- Location: Abbey Road, Bourne

History
- Built: 1870

Site notes
- Architect: Charles Bell
- Architectural style: Italianate style

The Corn Exchange is a commercial building in Abbey Road in Bourne, Lincolnshire, England. The structure is currently used as a community events venue.

== History ==
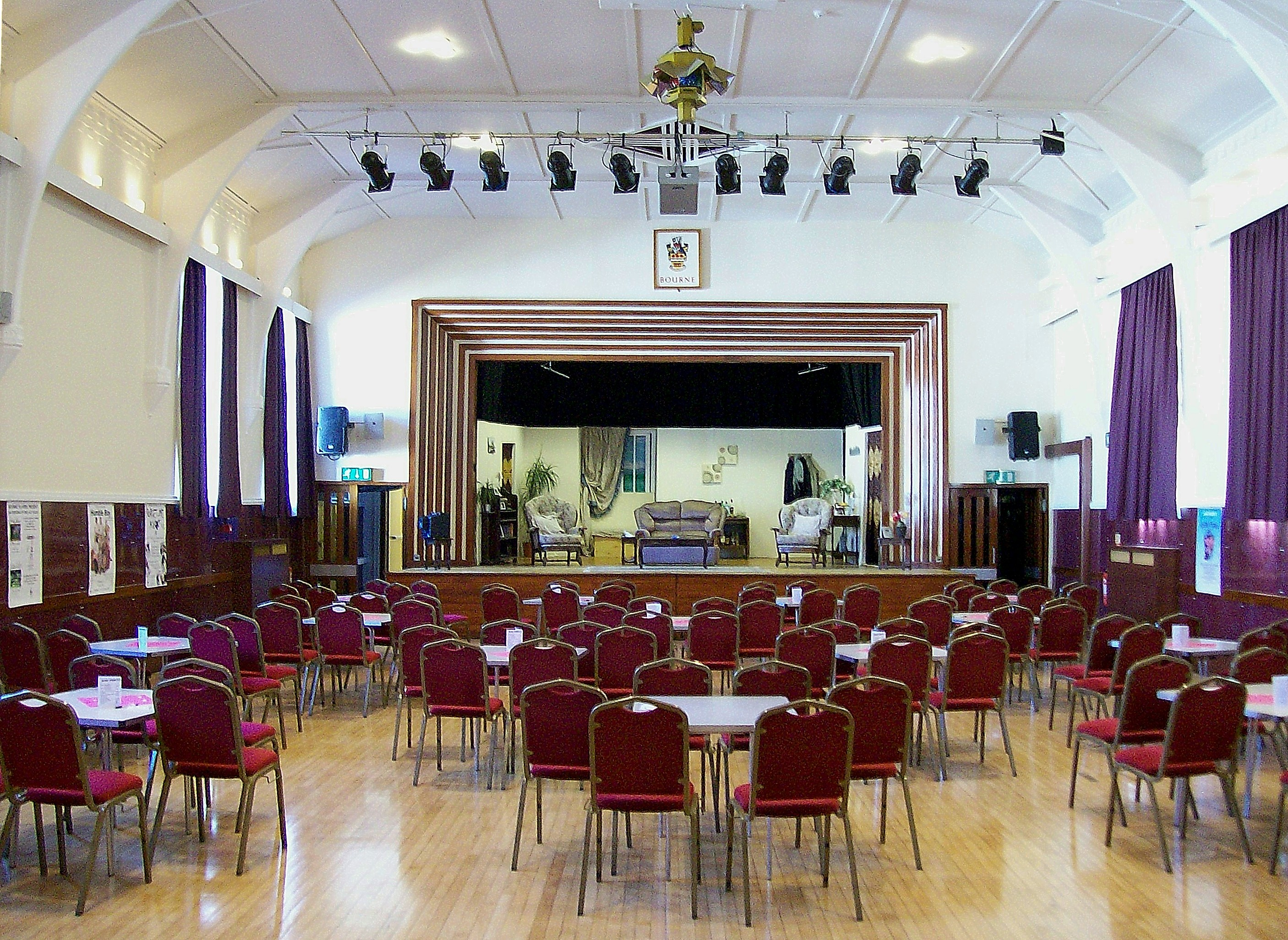
The main hall

In early 1870, a group of local businessmen decided to form a company, to be known as the "Bourne Public Hall and Corn Exchange Company", to finance and commission a purpose-built corn exchange for the town. The site they selected, on the northeast side of Abbey Road, was leased to the proprietors of an old post office. The lord of the manor, William Cecil, 3rd Marquess of Exeter, whose seat was at Burghley House, agreed to make the freehold interest in the site available to the directors of the new company on favourable terms.

The building was designed by Charles Bell in the Italianate style, built by Robert Young of Lincoln in red brick with stone dressings at a cost of £2,000 and was officially opened on 13 October 1870. The design involved an asymmetrical main frontage of four bays facing onto Abbey Road. The central section of two bays featured a two-stage tower with round headed windows, flanked by short Corinthian order pilasters supporting voussoirs, in the first stage, and square headed windows in the second stage: it was surmounted by a steep pyramid-shaped roof with brattishing and a weather vane. The left-hand bay, which was single storey, was formed by a porch with an gable containing a stone shield inscribed with the words "Public Hall", while the right-hand bay was fenestrated on the first floor by three lancet windows of differing sizes. Internally, the principal rooms were the hall keeper's accommodation, which was in the tower at the front, and the main hall behind, which was 75 feet (23 m) long and 35 feet (11 m) wide.

The use of the building as a corn exchange declined significantly in the wake of the Great Depression of British Agriculture in the late 19th century. Instead, it was adapted for use as an ice skating rink in 1876. It went on to be used for lectures, operas and theatrical events: performers included the American entertainer, General Tom Thumb, in 1880, the magician, Hugh Washington Simmons also known as "Dr Lynn" in 1884, and the Bourne Amateur Operatic Society who performed the musical, The Quaker Girl, in 1930. The building was acquired by Bourne Urban District Council in June 1938, so allowing the company that developed the building to be wound up in November 1938.

The building also served as a popular concert venue: the Irish rock band, Thin Lizzy, performed there in October 1973. Following local government re-organisation in 1974, ownership of the building was transferred to South Kesteven District Council. In the early 1990s, it was substantially remodelled at a cost of £900,000 with a large modern extension being added to the rear of the structure. Following completion of the works, the leader of South Kesteven District Council, Councillor Marjorie Clark, officially re-opened the complex on 4 September 1991. A further major programme of refurbishment works, which involved the creation of a community access point at the rear of the building, was completed at a cost of £600,000 in 2013.

== See also ==
- Corn exchanges in England
