= Bourne United Charities =

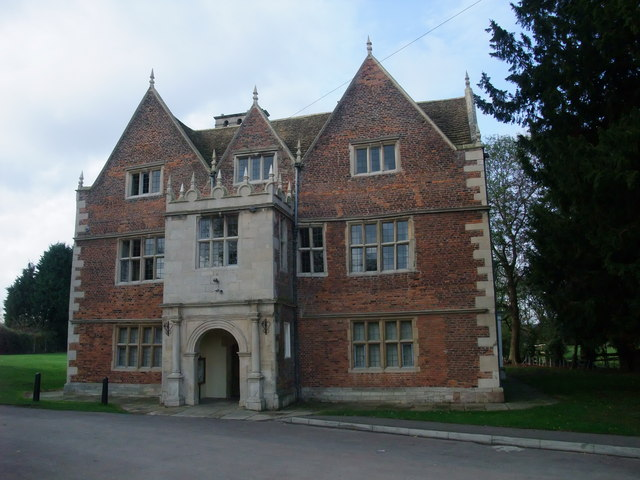
- Red Hall, a Grade II listed building, contains Bourne United Charities' office
- Type: Charity
- Purpose: Joint administration of several legacies dedicated for the relief of poverty, the provision of housing and accommodation and environmental, conservation or heritage objectives in the Parish of Bourne
- Location: Bourne
- Region served: United Kingdom
- Official language: English

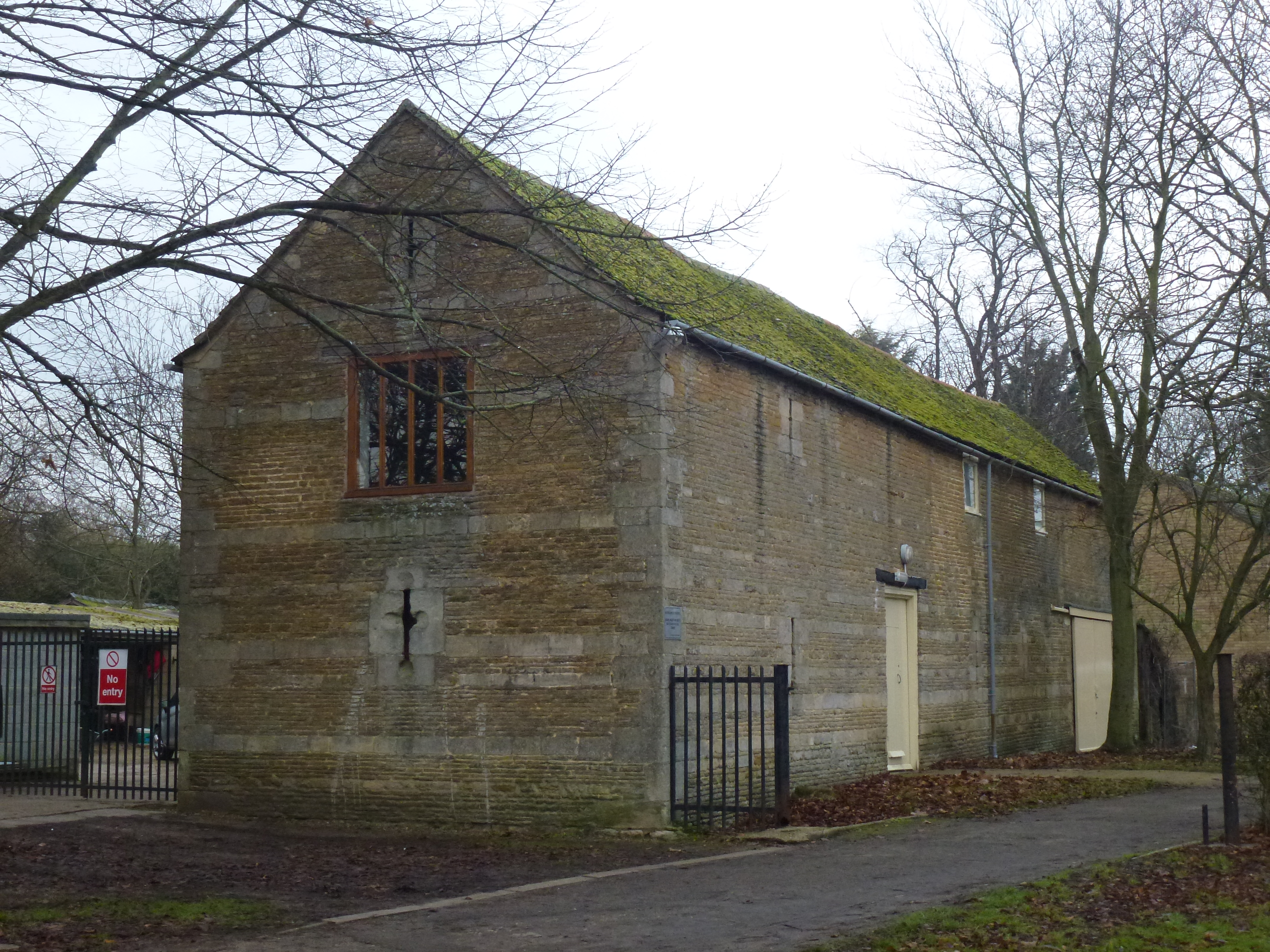
Shippon Barn Grade II listed building, supposedly built with materials taken from the castle, particularly the "arrow slit" windows.

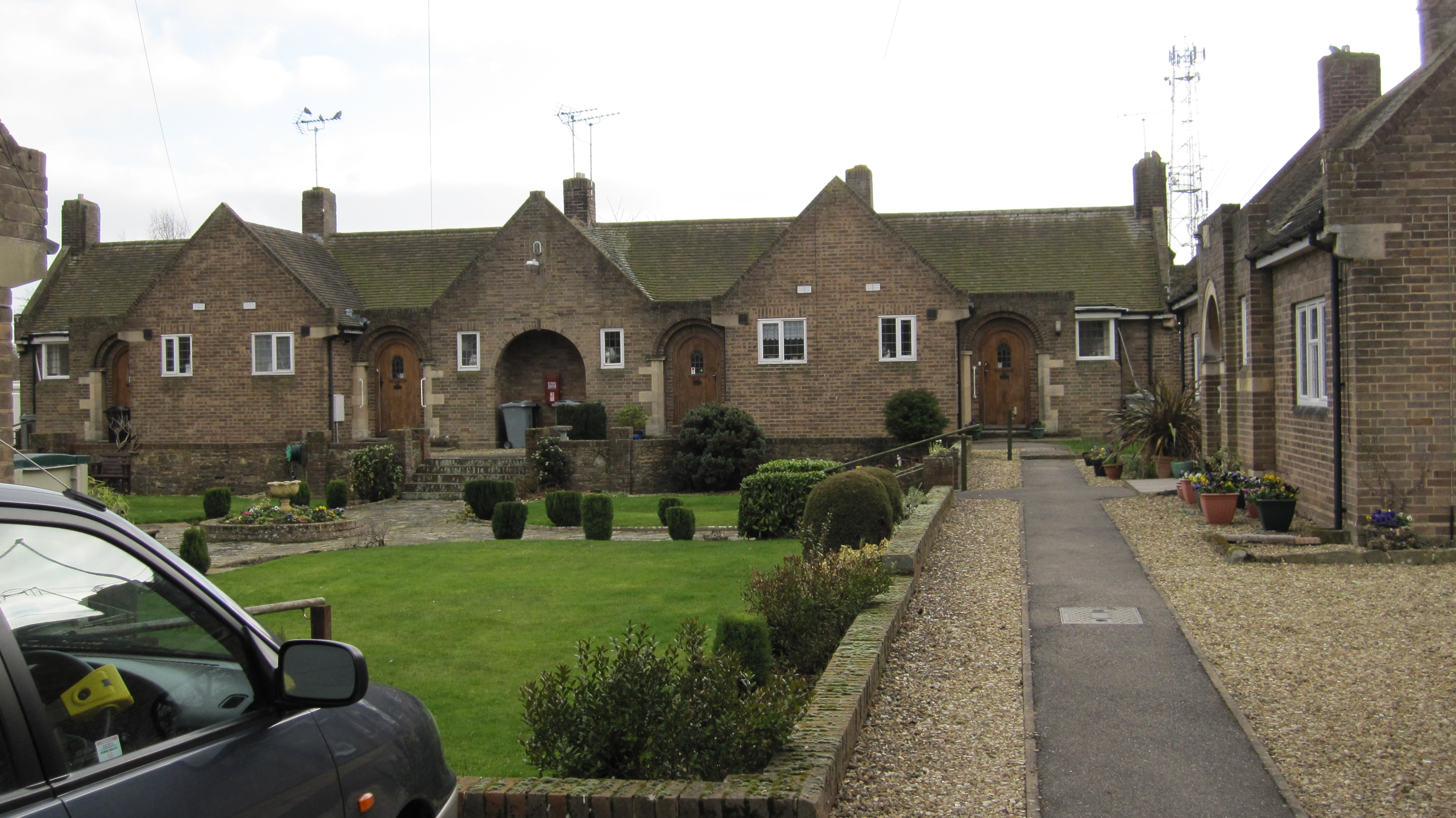
BUC Almshouses in West Street, built in 1931.

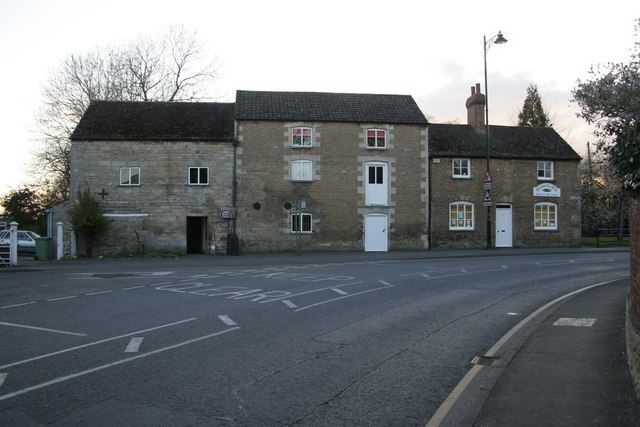
Baldock's mill

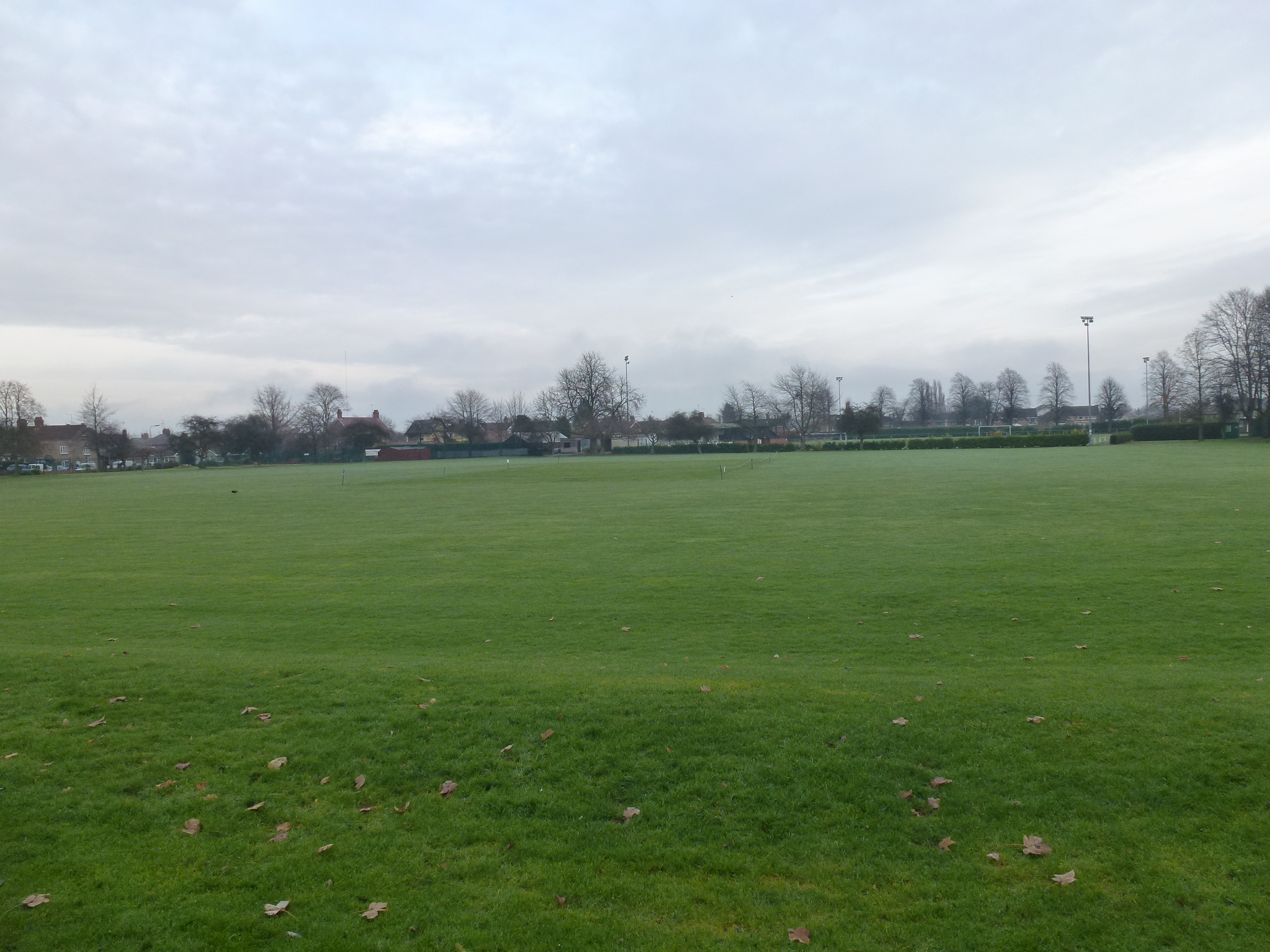
Abbey Lawns playing field.

Bourne United Charities is registered with the Charity Commission for England and Wales. Its purpose is the joint administration of several legacies dedicated for the relief of poverty, the provision of housing and accommodation and environmental, conservation or heritage objectives in the Parish of Bourne. The nine principal endowments are:

1. John Brown
2. William Fisher for Almshouses
3. William Fisher for Bread
4. Robert Harrington
5. Jeremiah Ives
6. North Fen Poor's Land
7. South Fen Poor's Land
8. Nicholas Rand
9. William Trollope

== Principal Assets ==
Bourne United Charities owns Abbey Lawn, a recreation ground in the centre of Bourne, along with the Wellhead Park, which is a public park. The Charities own and administer almshouses in West Street in the town. It also owns a number of investment properties in the town and elsewhere, principally in Leytonstone in the London Borough of Waltham Forest. In Bourne, their principal property is the Red Hall, where they have their office, and they also own Baldock's Mill, home of the Bourne Civic Society.

== Activities ==
Bourne United Charities is administered by fifteen Trustees and a clerk, five of the trustees being nominated by the Town Council.

BUC manage the 12 almshouses they built in West Road, and a plot of 13 gardening allotments at the corner of Meadow Drove and Spalding Road. They own and manage the Wellhead park and the Abbey Lawn sports field in the centre of town.

Bourne United Charities own the Wellhead Cottage, and several other restored buildings that are used by community organisations. These include the Shippon Barn on the edge of the Wellhead Gardens, used by the Scouts and the Guides, and the early 19th century Baldock's Mill in South Street that is now operated as a museum by the Civic Society.
