= Bourne Abbey =

Coordinates: 52.7663°N 0.3756°W

- Parish Church of St. Peter and St. Paul
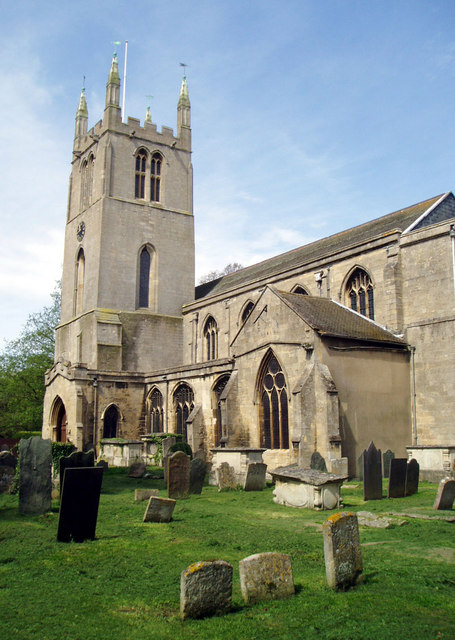
- Bourne Abbey
- OS grid reference: TF 09692 19985
- Location: Church Walk; Bourne, Lincolnshire; PE10 9UQ
- Country: England
- Denomination: Church of England
- Website: bourneabbey.uk

History
- Status: Parish church
- Founded: 1138
- Founder: Baldwin FitzGilbert

Architecture
- Functional status: Active

Administration
- Diocese: Lincoln

Clergy
- Vicar: Rev Fr Chris Atkinson

Bourne Abbey and the Parish Church of St. Peter and St. Paul is a scheduled Grade I church in Bourne, Lincolnshire, England. The building remains in parochial use, despite the 16th-century Dissolution, as the nave was used by the parish, probably from the time of the foundation of the abbey in 1138.

== Monastic origins ==
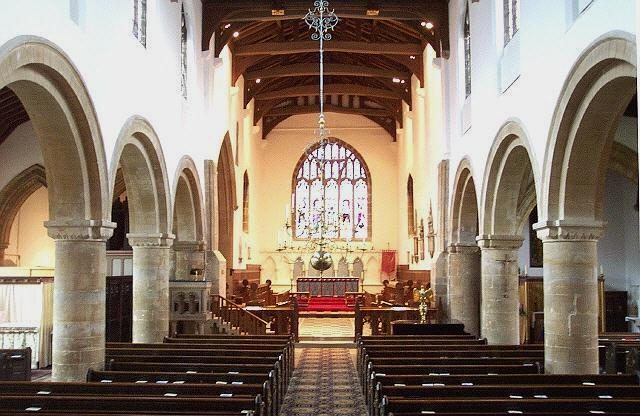
The nave of Bourne Abbey today. The two nave arcades are consistent with a building date of around 1138 as are the responds from the chancel screen, visible at the entrance to the chancel. The repaired scars from the removal of the pulpitum can be seen below them. In the building there are stones carved into the form of arches of a style consistent with the later 12th century. These are likely to be from the eastern side of this pulpitum screen, which would have obscured the view of the chancel while allowing sounds out from it.

While the Domesday Book of 1086 makes it clear that there was a church in Bourne in 1066, and there is a suggestion that there was an Anglo-Saxon abbey, as far as is firmly known, the abbey was founded as a canonry, by a charter granted in 1138, by Baldwin fitz Gilbert de Clare (with the consent of Roger his son and Adelina his wife). He was a member of a post-conquest Norman family, settled in Suffolk, which later made its mark in Wales and Ireland. Adelina was a great-granddaughter of Hereward the Wake, though the connection with the Wake family was not made until the generation after Baldwin and Adelina, when their daughter Emma married Hugh Wake. The house was for up to 14 canons of the Arrouaisian reform of the Rule of St. Augustine. This was the height of the period of abbey founding and castle-building in England.

The foundation of the abbey was part of a general restructuring of the estate so that the current town centre was built as a new town at the entrance to Baldwin's new castle. The new main road passed between Baldwin's new castle and the abbey. The pre-Norman road lies under the junction between the nave and the chancel. This proximity to the road may have influenced Baldwin's thinking when choosing an order for the new abbey. By this time, Arrouaise itself was moving away from being a hermitage towards providing a service for travellers.

In the late 13th century, the estate associated with Bourne Castle was reorganised so that the main road was moved onto what had been part of the site of the castle and a little away from the abbey.

The abbey was dissolved in 1536 along with the other small monastic houses, in the first phase of Henry VIII's Dissolution of the Monasteries.

=== Abbots ===
The following is a chronological list of the abbots as far as they are known. It is based on that in Swift's book, and from the Victoria County History.

- Abbey charter 1138
- Gervaise of Arrouaise 1138
- David 1156
- Baldwin 1212
- Everard Gutt 1224, resigned 1237
- William of Repton 1237
- Robert de Hamme, 1248, died 1260
- Robert de Hasceby (Haceby), elected 1260, resigned 1275
- William of Spalding, elected 1275
- Nicholas 1287
- Alan de Wauz (Waux), died 1292
- Thomas de Calstewith (Colsterworth), elected 1292, died 1313
- William of St Albans, elected 1313, resigned 1314
- William of Abbotsley, elected 1314, died 1324
- John of Wytheton, elected 1324, died 1334
- Simon of Walton, elected 1334, died 1355 (mentioned as Simon Watton 1350 by Swift)
- Thomas of Grantham, elected 1355, died 1369
- Geffory of Deeping, elected 1369, occurs to 1406
- William of Irnham, occurred 1440
- Henry, died 1500
- Thomas Ford, 1500
- William Grisby, died 1512
- John Small, last abbot, occurs 1534
- Dissolution, 1536

Simon Watton was excommunicated, though his offence is unknown.

== Literary associations ==
The Ormulum, a missal rendered in phonetically spelled English verse, helps bridge the gap between Old and Middle English in studies of the development of the language. It was probably written in Bourne Abbey by Orrm, an Augustinian canon, in around 1175.

Robert Mannyng, or Robert de Brunne, is well known among scholars of Middle English for his works dating from the early 14th century. He led the writing of English out of its eclipse by Latin and Anglo-Norman. He is often said to have been a monk in Bourne Abbey but he was a Gilbertine and the abbey was Arrouaisian or Augustinian. His name which associates him with 'Brunne', the form of 'Bourne' used in his time, is likely to have arisen from his having originated in the town. Since the nave of the abbey was the parish church, he will have known it well as a boy until he left for Sempringham in 1288.

== Burials ==
- Thomas Holland, 2nd Earl of Kent (1350/1354–1397)
- Edmund Holland, 4th Earl of Kent

== See also ==
- List of English abbeys, priories and friaries serving as parish churches
- Bourne Abbey Church of England Academy
