= Bourne, Lincolnshire =

Market town in Lincolnshire, England

Coordinates: 52.7684°N 0.3775°W

Bourne
- Town and civil parish
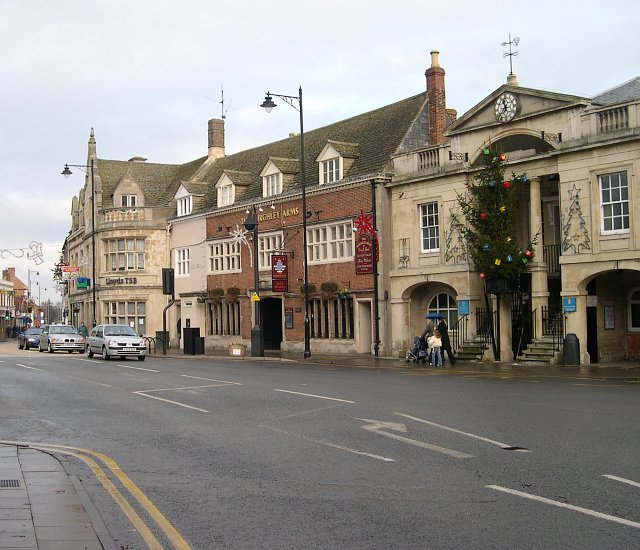
- Bourne town centre

- Location within Lincolnshire
- Interactive map showing the parish boundary
- Population: 17,988 (2021 census)
- OS grid reference: TF094202
  - London: 90 mi (140 km) S
- Civil parish: Bourne
- District: South Kesteven
- Shire county: Lincolnshire
- Region: East Midlands
- Country: England
- Sovereign state: United Kingdom
- Post town: Bourne
- Postcode district: PE10
- Dialling code: 01778
- Police: Lincolnshire
- Fire: Lincolnshire
- Ambulance: East Midlands
- UK Parliament: Grantham and Bourne

Bourne is a market town and civil parish in the South Kesteven district of Lincolnshire, England. It lies on the eastern slopes of the limestone Kesteven Uplands and the western edge of the Fens, 11 miles (18 km) north-east of Stamford, 12 miles (19 km) west of Spalding and 17 miles (27 km) north of Peterborough. At the 2021 census, the parish had a population of 17,988.

== History ==
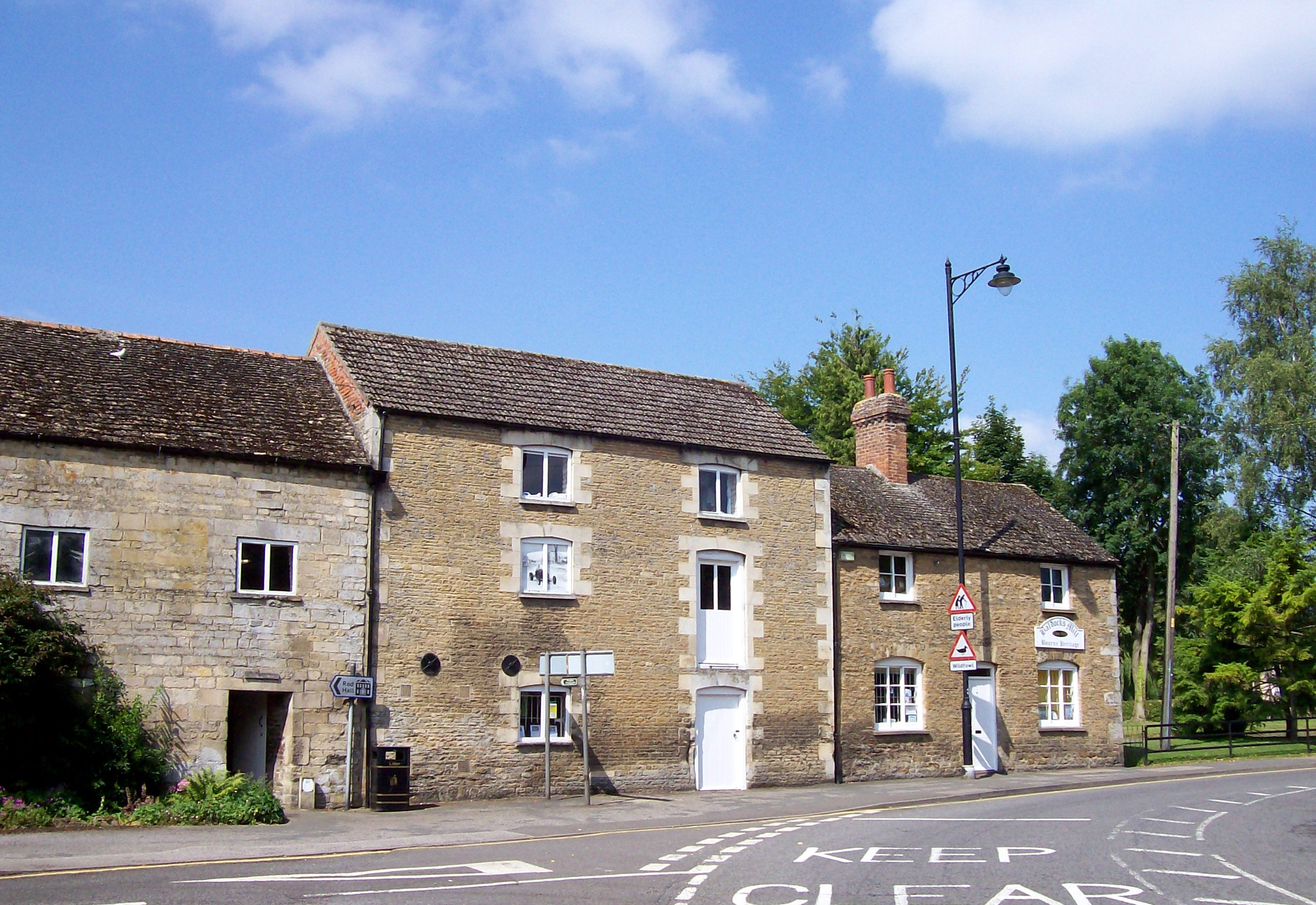
Baldock's Mill heritage centre

The ancient woodland of Bourne Woods is still extant, although much reduced. It originally formed part of the ancient Forest of Kesteven and is now managed by the Forestry Commission.

The earliest documentary reference to Brunna, meaning stream, is from a document of 960, and the town appeared in Domesday Book of 1086 as Brune.

Bourne Abbey, (charter 1138), formerly held and maintained land in Bourne and other parishes. In later times this was known as the manor of Bourne Abbots. Whether the canons knew that name is less clear. The estate was given by the founder of the Abbey, Baldwin fitz Gilbert de Clare, son of Gilbert fitz Richard, and later benefactors. The abbey was established under the Arrouaisian order. Its fundamental rule was that of St Augustine and as time went on it came to be regarded as Augustinian. The Ormulum, an important Middle English Biblical gloss, was probably written in the abbey in around 1175.

Bourne Castle was built on land that is now the Wellhead Gardens in South Street.

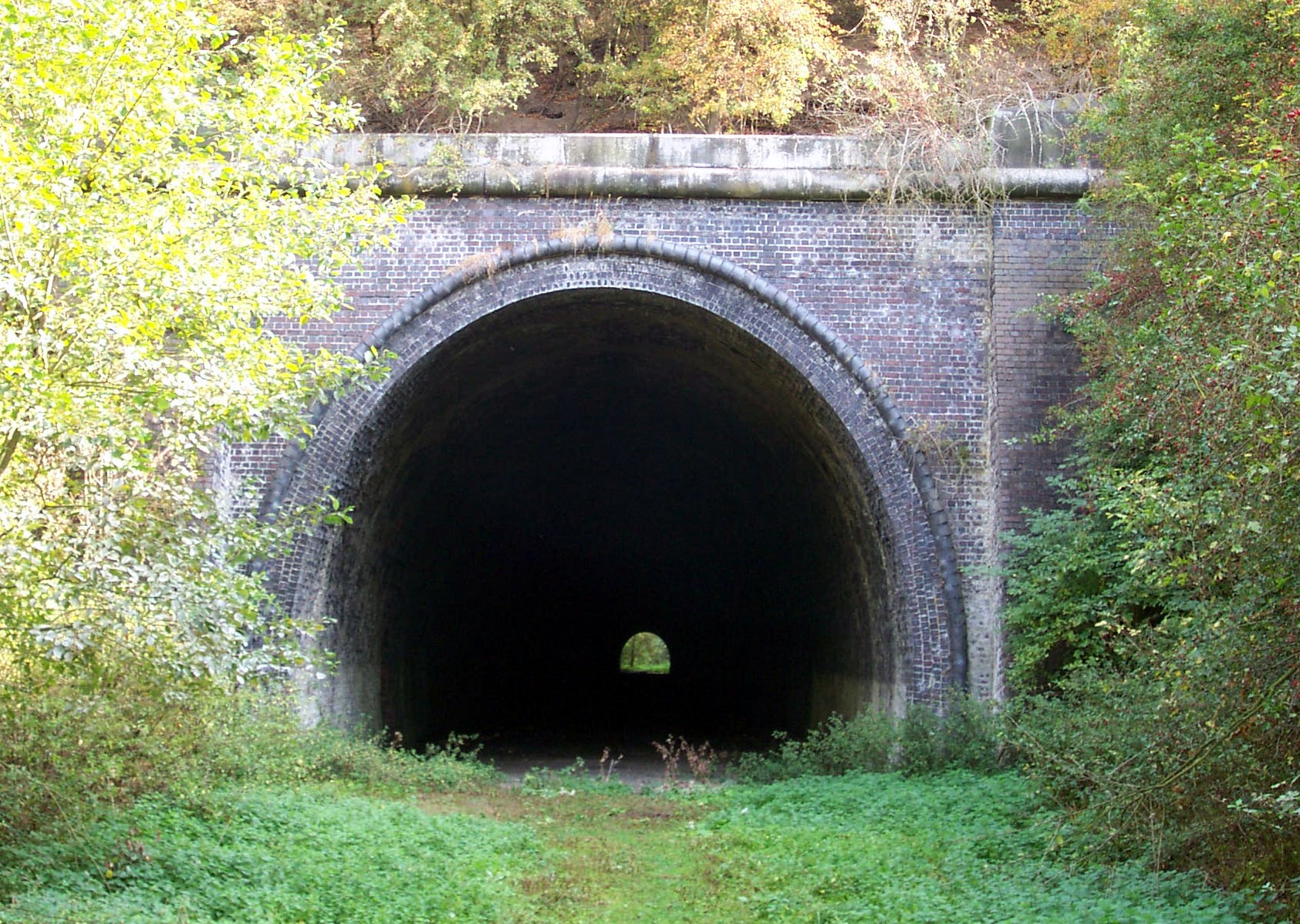
Toft Tunnel

Much of Bourne's 19th-century affluence came from the corn-trade boom that followed the mechanisation of fen drainage. The Corn Exchange in Abbey Road dates from 1870.

Bourne railway station was an important junction on the Victorian railway system, but all such connections were severed after the Second World War (see Railways section). The business stimulus it brought caused major development of the town and many of the buildings around the medieval street plan were rebuilt or at least refaced. Improved communications allowed a bottled-water industry to develop and coal to be delivered to the town's gas works.

The local authority at the time, Bourne Urban District Council, was active in the town's interests, taking over the gas works and the local watercress beds at times of financial difficulty and running them as commercial ventures. Large numbers of good-quality council houses were built in the early 20th century.

Bourne sent many men to both world wars but was otherwise not much affected. During the Second World War a German bomber shot down in May 1941 crashed into the Butcher's Arms public house in Eastgate. The landlord, his wife and eight soldiers billetted across the road were killed, as were the bomber's crew. In a separate incident several bombs were dropped on the Hereward Camp.

== Geography ==
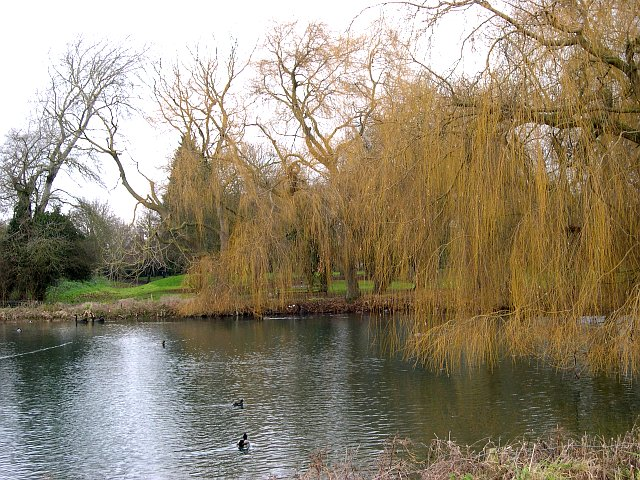
St. Peters' Pool, Wellhead Gardens. The pool referred to in the town's founding legend

The town is located on a Roman road now known as King Street. It was built around some natural springs, hence the name "Bourne" (or "Bourn"). which derives from the Anglo-Saxon burna or burne meaning "water" or "stream". It lies on the intersection of two main roads: the A15 and the A151. The civil parish includes the main township along with the hamlets of Cawthorpe, Dyke and Twenty. In former years Austerby was regarded as a separate settlement, with its own shops and street plan, but it is now an area of Bourne.

== Governance ==
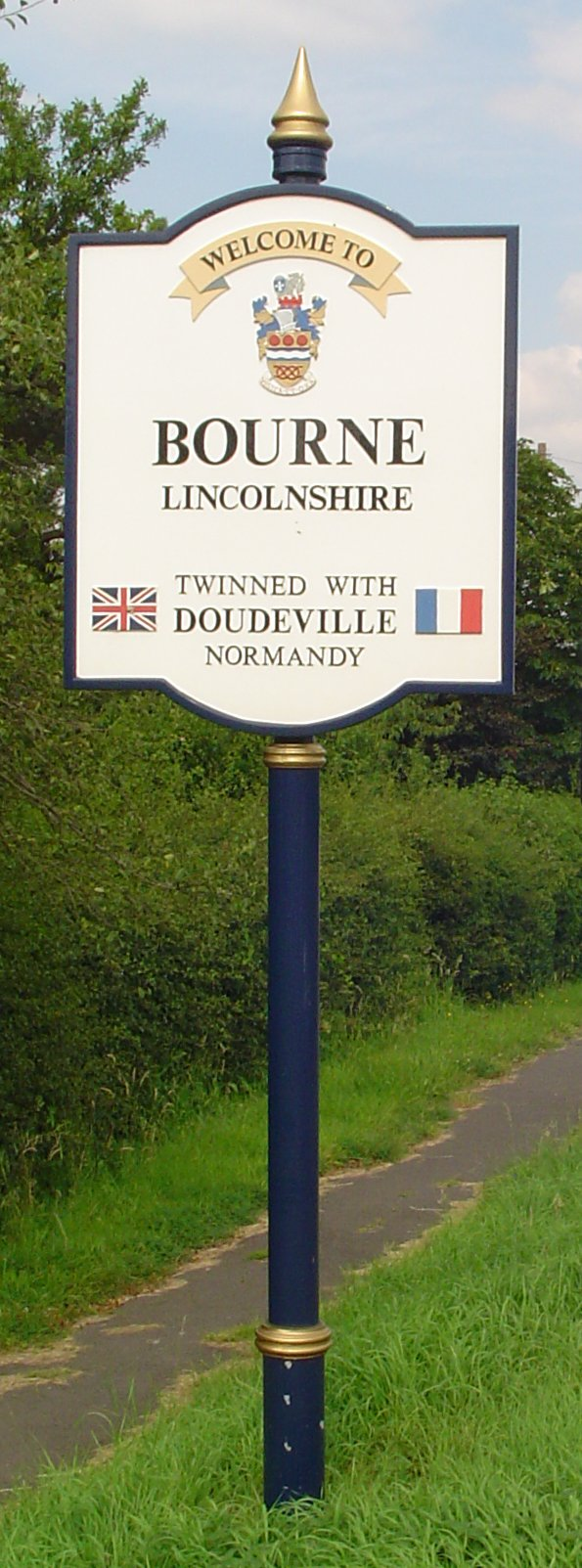
Signpost in Bourne

=== Lincolnshire County Council ===
Bourne has two county council divisions:

- Bourne North and Morton
- Bourne South and Thurlby

=== South Kesteven District Council ===
Bourne has three District Council wards, two having two councillors and the new ward, Austerby, having three councillors.

- Bourne East
- Bourne West
- Bourne Austerby

=== Bourne Town Council ===
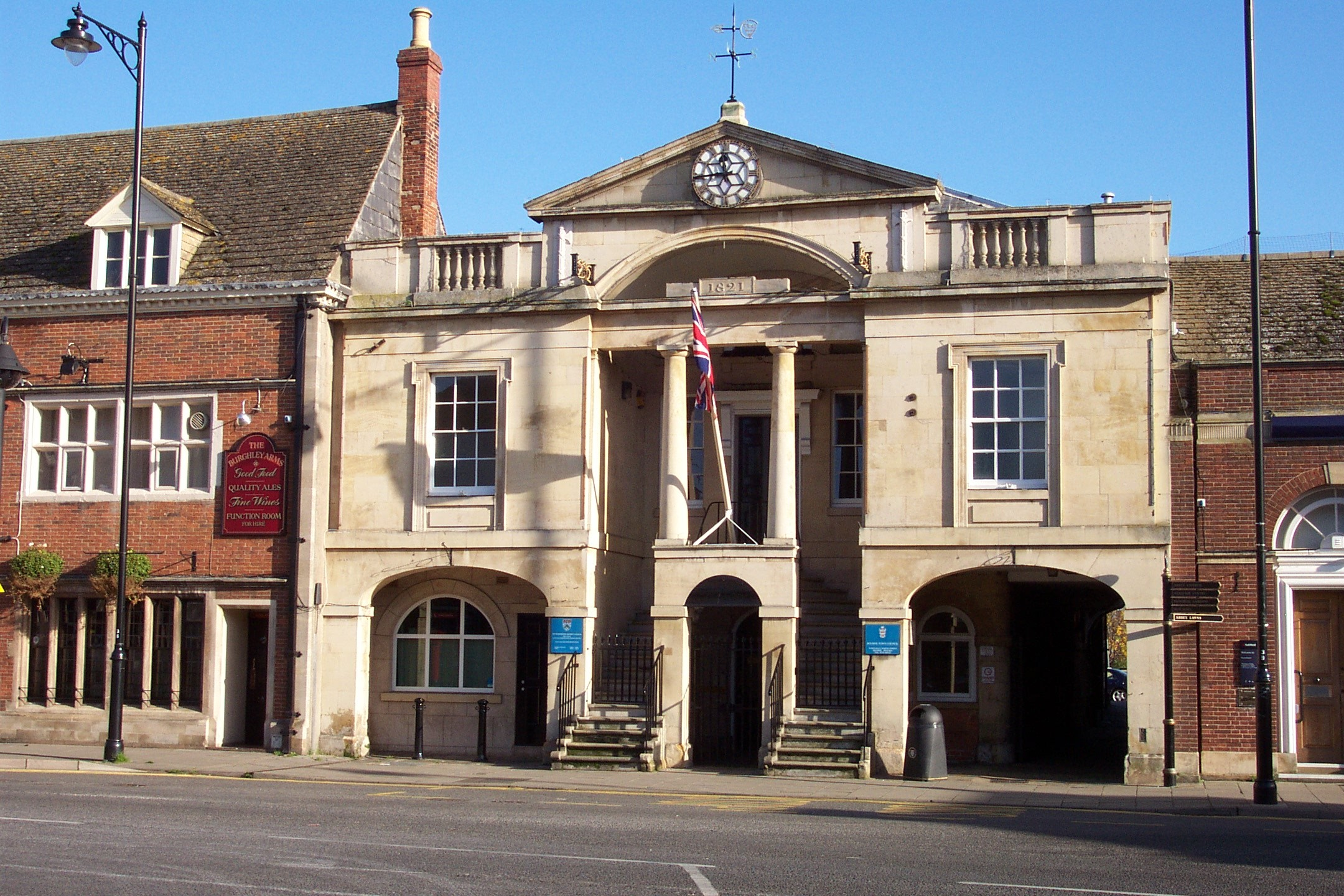
Bourne Town Hall (1821) by local architect Bryan Browning

Bourne Town Council has two wards which are identical to the South Kesteven District Council wards. Bourne East elects seven councillors to the town council and Bourne West eight.

From 1899 to 1974, Bourne had an urban district council in the former Parts of Kesteven. Under the Local Government Act 1972, Bourne UDC was dissolved into the newly formed South Kesteven district. Urban districts which disappeared in this way formed successor parishes and were given a dispensation to call their "parish" councils "town" councils, with their chairs to be known as mayor. These town councils were allowed to adopt the coat of arms granted to the former UDC.

A Bourne Rural District also existed from 1894 to 1931, when it was abolished to form part of a larger South Kesteven Rural District. The parish of Bourne had formed part of Bourne RD from 1894 to 1899. South Kesteven RDC had its own coat of arms, which disappeared along with that of Kesteven in 1974.

=== International links ===
Since October 1989, Bourne has been twinned with Doudeville, Seine-Maritime, France.

=== Drainage ===
Parts of west Bourne are drained by one of two internal drainage boards, The Black Sluice IDB and the Welland and Deepings IDB.

Many houses in Bourne pay additional drainage rates to these authorities. Details of the designated flood risk areas can be found on a number of government web sites.

=== Education ===
- Bourne Abbey Church of England Academy (primary)
- Bourne Grammar School (secondary with sixth form)
- Bourne Academy, formerly Robert Manning Technology College (secondary with sixth form)
- Bourne Westfield Primary Academy (primary)
- Willoughby School (Special Educational needs)
- Bourne Elsea Park Primary Academy (primary)

== Demographics ==
At the 2021 census, the civil parish had a population of 17,988 people in 7,715 households.

Census population of Bourne parish
Census	Population	Female	Male	Households	Source
2001	11,933	6,169	5,764	4,965	
2011	14,456	7,541	6,915	6,111	
2021	17,988	9,321	8,667	7,715	

== Transport ==
=== Road ===
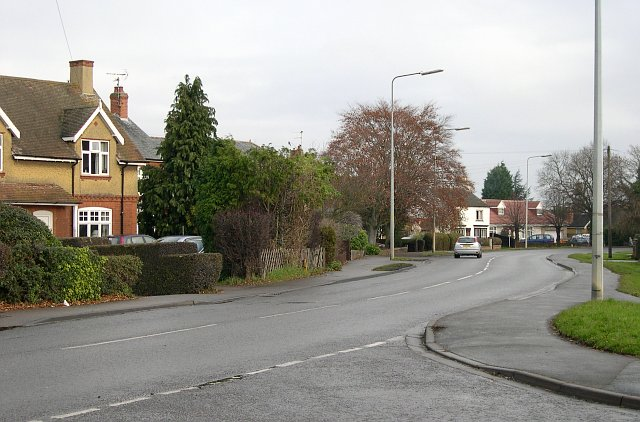
West Road

The A15 road runs directly through the town. Other connecting roads are the A6121 on the west side of the town, leading to Corby Glen, and the A151 on the east side, leading to Spalding.

=== Bus ===
There is a bus station at the top of North Street. The town's bus services provide a frequent public transport link to Peterborough, and are operated by the family-owned Delaine Buses. There is a daily long-distance coach between Grimsby and London Victoria, which stops at Bourne bus station.

=== Railways ===
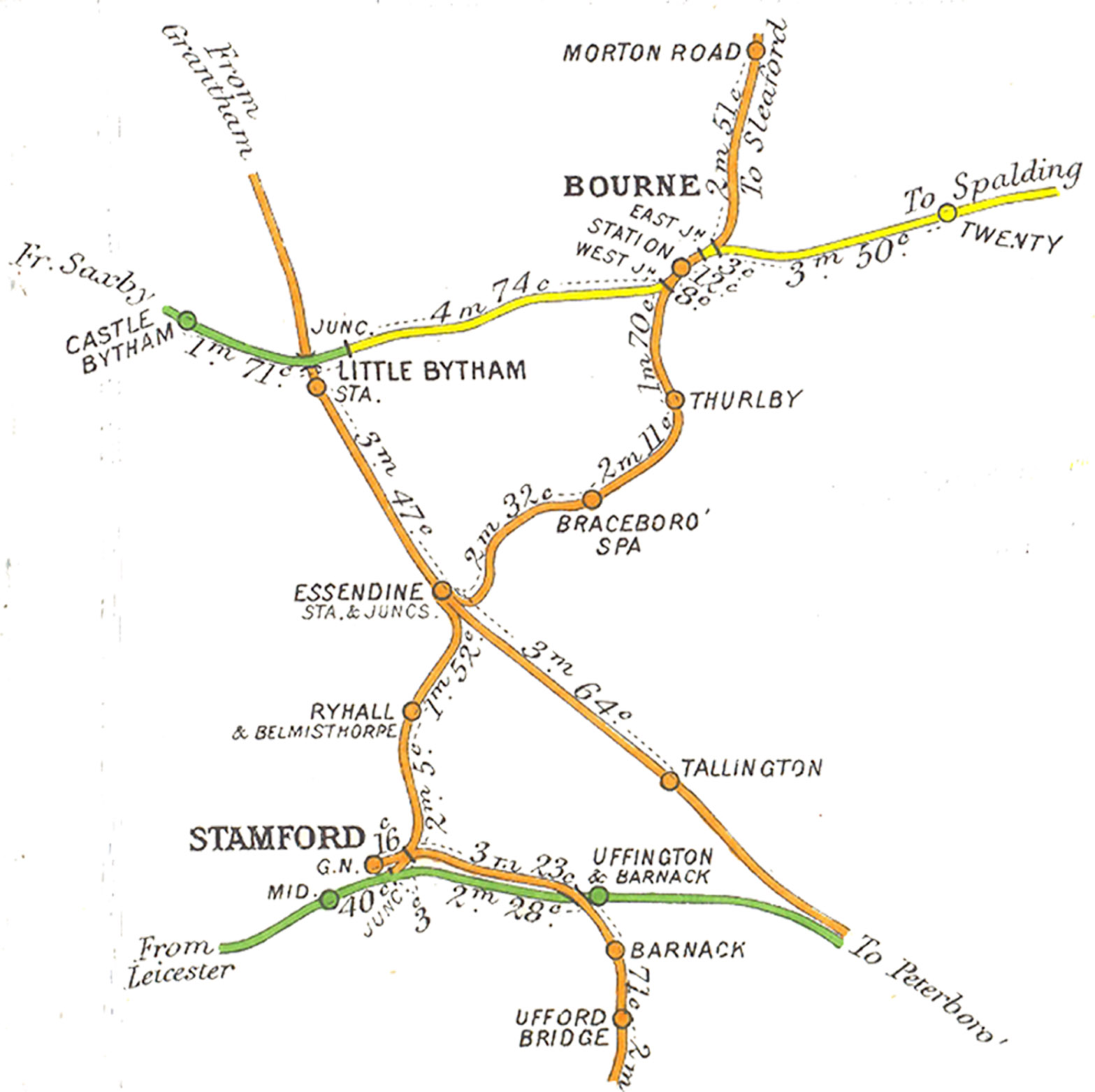
The railways around Bourne and Stamford in 1915

The first local railway was the Earl of Ancaster's estate railway, which ran from the East Coast Main Line at Little Bytham, through the Grimsthorpe estate to Edenham.

Later Bourne had a railway station served by the Bourn and Essendine Railway (old spelling) line from Essendine to Sleaford and by the Midland and Great Northern Joint Railway (M&GN) connecting the Midlands to East Anglia. Timetabled passenger services on both lines had ceased by the end of February 1959.

=== Shipping ===
The Bourne-Morton Canal or Bourne Old Ea connected the town to the sea in Roman times.

Until the mid-19th century, the present Bourne Eau was capable of carrying commercial boat traffic from the Wash coast and Spalding. This resulted from the investment following the Bourne Navigation Act 1780 (21 Geo. 3. c. 22). Passage became impossible once the junction of the Eau and the River Glen was converted from gates to a sluice in 1860.

== Religious sites ==
The ecclesiastical parish of Bourne is part of the Beltisloe Deanery of the Diocese of Lincoln, based at the Bourne Abbey in Church Walk.

Other religious congregations in the town include Methodist (Bourne Methodist Church), Baptist (Bourne Baptist Church), Evangelical (Bourne Evangelical Church), Roman Catholic (St. Gilbert's Catholic Church), and spiritualist (Bourne Spritualist Church).

== Media ==
Local news and television programmes are provided by BBC Yorkshire and Lincolnshire and ITV Yorkshire. Television signals are received from the Belmont TV transmitter, the Waltham TV transmitter can also be received which broadcast BBC East Midlands and ITV Central programmes.

The town is served by both BBC Radio Cambridgeshire and BBC Radio Lincolnshire. Other radio stations including Greatest Hits Radio, Hits Radio Lincolnshire and Bourne Community Radio, a community based station.

The local newspapers are the Bourne Local and Stamford Mercury.

== Sport ==
Bourne Town Football Club plays football in the United Counties Football League, whilst Bourne Cricket Club plays in the Lincolnshire ECB Premier League. These teams play their home games at the Abbey Lawn, a recreation ground privately owned by the Bourne United Charities.

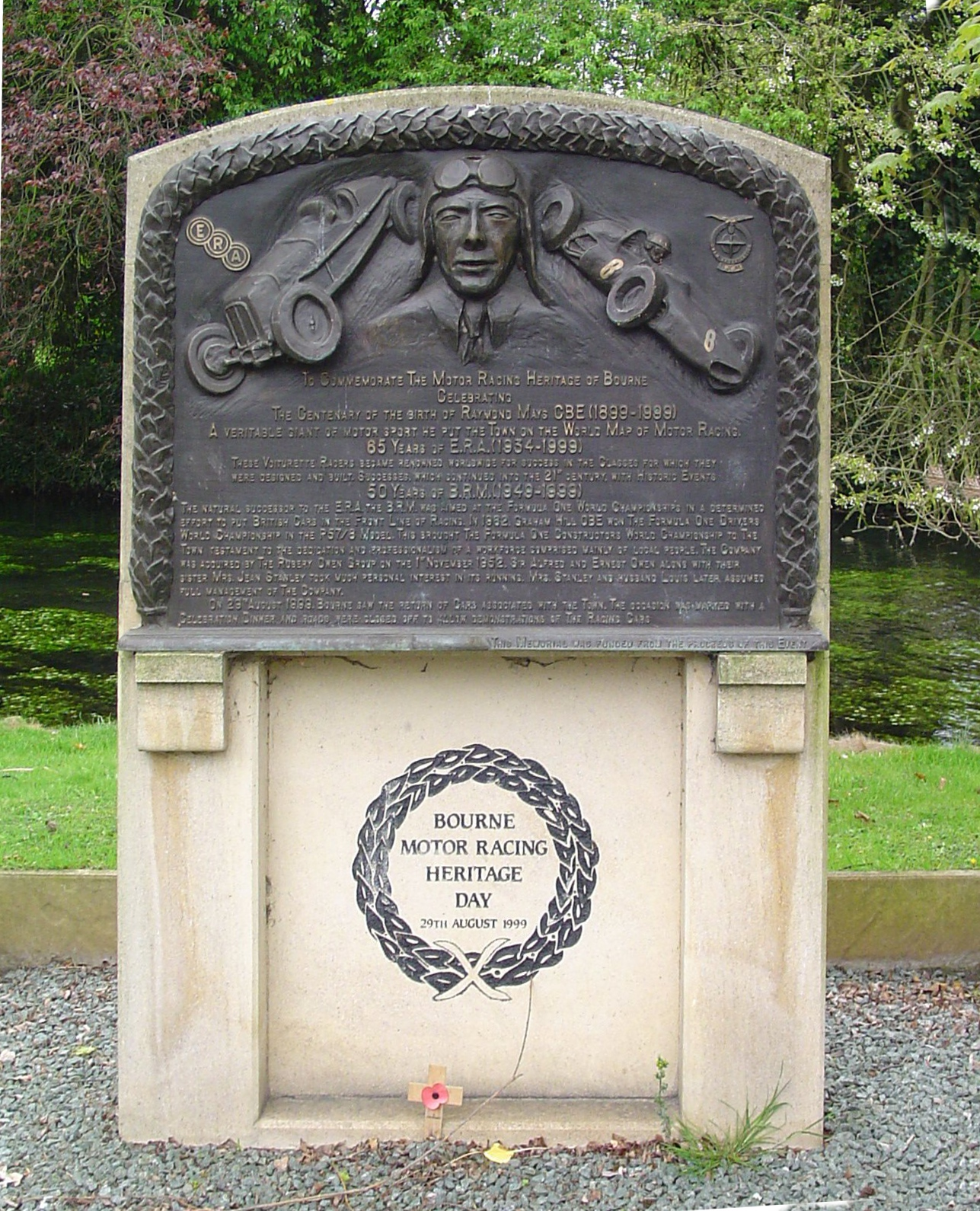
Motor Racing Memorial

The racing-car marques English Racing Automobiles (ERA) and British Racing Motors (BRM) were both founded in Bourne by Raymond Mays, an international racing driver and designer who lived in Bourne. The former ERA and BRM workshops in Spalding Road are adjacent to Eastgate House, the Mays' family home in the town's Eastgate. Pilbeam Racing Designs is also based in the town.

== Landmarks ==
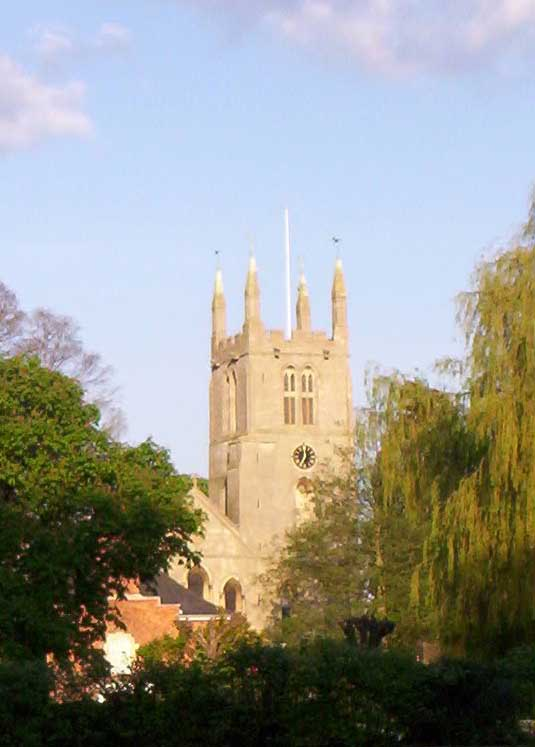
The Abbey and Parish Church of St Peter and St Paul

There are currently 71 listed buildings in the parish of Bourne, including Bourne Abbey and the Parish Church of St Peter and St Paul (1138), which is the only one scheduled grade I, as well as the Red Hall.

== Notable people ==
- Bourne is reputedly the birthplace of Hereward the Wake (in about 1035), although the 12th-century source of this information, De Gestis Herwardi Saxonis, refers only to his father as being "of Bourne" and to the father's house and retainers there.
- Robert Mannyng (1264–1340) is credited with putting the speech of the ordinary people of his time into recognisable form. He is better known as Robert de Brunne because of his long period of residence as a canon at Bourne Abbey. There he completed his life's work of popularising religious and historical material in a Middle English dialect that was easily understood at that time.
- William Cecil (1520–1598) became the first Lord Burghley after serving Queen Elizabeth I. He was born at a house in the centre of Bourne that is now the Burghley Arms.
- Dr William Dodd (1729–1777), was an Anglican clergyman, man of letters and forger. He was prosecuted, sentenced to death and publicly hanged at Tyburn in 1777.
- Charles Frederick Worth (1825–1895), son of a solicitor, lived at Wake House in North Street. He moved to Paris and became a renowned designer of women's fashion and the founder of haute couture. The French government awarded him the Légion d'honneur.
- Sir George White (1840–1912), MP for North West Norfolk, a seat he held for twelve years until he died in 1912. He was knighted for public service in 1907.
- Lilian Wyles (1885–1975) was the first woman officer of the Metropolitan Police's CID in 1922. The only daughter of the Bourne brewer Joseph Wyles, she started her police career in the women patrols, assisting young girls at risk.
- Raymond Mays (1899–1980), son of a local businessman, was a successful motor racing driver and manufacturer.
