= Woolsthorpe =

Woolsthorpe may refer to

- Woolsthorpe, Victoria, a town in Victoria, Australia
- Woolsthorpe by Belvoir, a village in Lincolnshire, England, 5 miles (8 km) west of Grantham
- Woolsthorpe-by-Colsterworth, a village in Lincolnshire, England, 7 miles (11 km) south of Grantham
  - Woolsthorpe Manor, birthplace of Sir Isaac Newton
