= Early life of Isaac Newton =

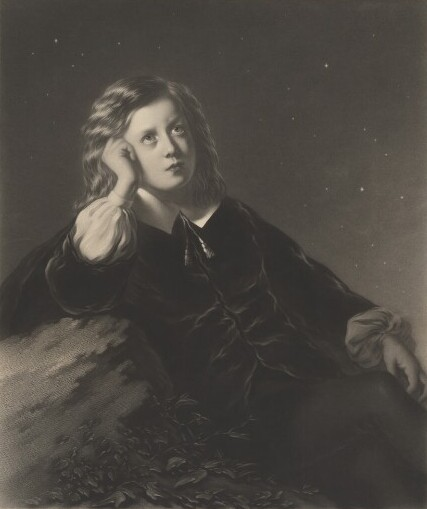
Newton at 12 in an imaginary portrait from the 19th century, showing how he may have looked around the time he enrolled in The King's School, Grantham.

The following article is part of a biography of Sir Isaac Newton, the English mathematician and scientist, author of the Principia. It portrays the years after Newton's birth in 1643, his education, as well as his early scientific contributions, before the writing of his main work, the Principia Mathematica, in 1685.

== Overview of Newton's life ==
Sir Isaac Newton is known for many scientific findings. These discoveries include the laws of motion, the theory of gravity, and basic calculus. Although Newton was predominantly known for his discoveries in mathematics and physics, he also put much effort and study into chemistry, biblical history, and optics. One of Newton's most famous writings was the Principia where he described some of his major findings of time, physics, mathematics, and calculus. Although his theories soon became universal, he faced much opposition to his early theories. Specifically, his theory of gravity faced criticism from leading scientists such as Christiaan Huygens and Leibniz. After a few years of debate, Newton's concept of gravity became universally accepted as he became the dominant figure in the European continent.

== Birth and education ==
Isaac Newton was born 25 December 1642 Old Style (4 January 1643 on the Gregorian calendar, which is now used) at Woolsthorpe Manor in Woolsthorpe-by-Colsterworth, a hamlet in the county of Lincolnshire. (At the time of Newton's birth, England had not adopted the Gregorian calendar and therefore his date of birth was recorded as 25 December, according to the Julian calendar.)

Newton was born three months after the death of his father, a prosperous farmer also named Isaac Newton. His father was described as a "wealthy and uneducated man". Born prematurely, young Isaac was a small child; his mother Hannah Ayscough reportedly said that he could have fit inside a quart mug. When Newton was three, his mother remarried and went to live with her new husband, the Reverend Barnabas Smith, leaving her son in the care of his maternal grandmother, Margery Ayscough. The young Isaac disliked his stepfather and held some enmity towards his mother for marrying him, as revealed by this entry in a list of sins committed up to the age of 19: "Threatening my father and mother to burn them and the house over them." Later on his mother returned after her husband died.

From age 12 to age 16, Newton resided with William Clarke, apothecary, in Grantham, where he acquired his interest in chemistry. While living with the Clarke family, Newton was educated at the free grammar school (where his signature can still be seen upon a library window sill). He spent much of his time on independent pursuits, and did poorly in school. Newton was also captivated with mechanical devices and drawing. Not only did he analyze drawings and machines, he actually constructed them himself. From windmills to clocks, Newton constructed models of many objects that surrounded him in his everyday life. He was removed from school, and by October 1659 he was to be found at Woolsthorpe-by-Colsterworth, where his mother, widowed by now for a second time, attempted to make a farmer of him, which he hated. Henry Stokes, master at the King's School, persuaded his mother to send him back to school so that he might complete his education. Newton's uncle also had an influence in persuading his mother to send him back to school as he could see the natural ability of Isaac. This he did at the age of eighteen, achieving an admirable final report.

Newton lived his childhood during some of the most turbulent times in England as the Civil War began in 1642. Although the effects of the country's issues may not have directly affected Newton, the school and universities in England were certainly impacted. Whether it was for the better or worse was to be determined, but Newton was certainly going to have a unique schooling due to the country's unbalance.

Manuscript evidence shows that Newton's earliest known piece writing, a Latin phrasebook, as well as the first letter in his hand which has yet been found, addressed to a ‘Loving friend’, were copied from an unpublished version of a work on Latin pedagogy by William Walker, a schoolmaster and rector whose acquaintance with Newton is documented from 1665. This suggests an early influence of the schoolmaster on the natural philosopher when he was still a schoolboy.

In June 1661, he was admitted to Trinity College, Cambridge as a sizar—a sort of work-study role. At that time, the college's teachings were based on those of Aristotle, whom Newton supplemented with modern philosophers such as Descartes and astronomers such as Copernicus, Galileo, and Kepler. In 1665, he discovered the generalised binomial theorem and began to develop a mathematical theory that later became infinitesimal calculus. Soon after Newton had obtained his degree in August 1665, the university closed down as a precaution against the Great Plague of London. Although he had been undistinguished as a Cambridge student, Newton's private studies at his home in Woolsthorpe over the next two years saw the development of his theories on calculus, optics and the law of gravitation. In 1667 he returned to Cambridge as a fellow of Trinity.

Newton had stated that when he had purchased a book on astrology at Stourbridge fair, near Cambridge, he was unable, on account of his ignorance of trigonometry, to understand a figure of the heavens which was drawn in the book. He, therefore, bought an English edition of Euclid's Elements which included an index of propositions, and, having turned to two or three which he thought might be helpful, found them so obvious that he dismissed it "as a trifling book", and applied himself to the study of René Descartes' Geometry. It is reported that in his examination for a scholarship at Trinity, to which he was elected on 28 April 1664, he was examined in Euclid by Isaac Barrow, who was disappointed in Newton's lack of knowledge of the subject. Newton was convinced to read the Elements again with care, and formed a more favourable opinion of Euclid's merit.

Newton's study of Descartes' Geometry seems to have inspired him with a love of the subject, and introduced him to higher mathematics. In a small commonplace book, dated January 1664, there are several articles on angular sections, and the squaring of curves and "crooked lines that may be squared", several calculations about musical notes, geometrical propositions from François Viète and Frans van Schooten, annotations out of John Wallis's Arithmetic of Infinities, together with observations on refraction, on the grinding of "spherical optic glasses", on the errors of lenses and the method of rectifying them, and on the extraction of all kinds of roots, particularly those "in affected powers". In this same book the following entry made by Newton himself, many years afterward, gives a further account of the nature of his work during the period when he was an undergraduate:

July 4, 1699. By consulting an account of my expenses at Cambridge, in the years 1663 and 1664, I find that in the year 1664 a little before Christmas, I being then Senior Sophister, bought Schooten's Miscellanies and Cartes' Geometry (having read this Geometry and Oughtred's Clavis clean over half a year before), and borrowed Wallis' works, and by consequence made these annotations out of Schooten and Wallis, in winter between the years 1664 and 1665. At such time I found the method of Infinite Series; and in summer 1665, being forced from Cambridge by the plague, I computed the area of the Hyperbola at Boothby, in Lincolnshire, to two and fifty figures by the same method.

That Newton must have begun early to make careful observations of natural phenomena is shown by the following remarks about halos, which appear in his Optics, book ii. part iv. obs. 13:

The like Crowns appear sometimes about the moon; for at the beginning of the Year 1664, February 19th, at night, I saw two such Crowns about her. The Diameter of the first or innermost was about three Degrees, and that of the second about five Degrees and a half. Next about the moon was a Circle of white, and next about that the inner Crown, which was of a bluish-green within next the white, and of a yellow and red without, and next about these Colours were blue and green on the inside of the Outward Crown, and red on the outside of it. At the same time, there appeared a Halo about 22 Degrees 35' distant from the centre of the moon. It was elliptical, and its long Diameter was perpendicular to the Horizon, verging below farthest from the moon.

He formulated the three laws of motion:

- Every object in a state of uniform motion tends to remain in that state of motion unless an external force is applied to it.
- The relationship between an object's mass m, its acceleration a, and the applied force F is F = ma. Acceleration and force are vectors (as sometimes indicated by their symbols being displayed in slant bold font); in this law, the direction of the force vector is the same as the direction of the acceleration vector.
- For every action there is an equal and opposite reaction.

== Academic career ==
In January 1665 Newton took the degree of Bachelor of Arts. The persons appointed (in conjunction with the proctors, John Slade of Catharine Hall, Cambridge, and Benjamin Pulleyn of Trinity College, Newton's tutor) to examine the questionists were John Eachard of Catharine Hall and Thomas Gipps of Trinity University. It is a curious accident that we have no information about the respective merits of the candidates for a degree in this year since the "ordo senioritis" of the Bachelors of Arts for the year is omitted in the "Grace Book".

It is supposed that it was in 1665 that the method of fluxións (his term for calculus of variations) first occurred to Newton's mind. There are several papers in Newton's handwriting bearing dates 1665 and 1666 in which the method is described, in some of which dotted or dashed letters are used to represent fluxions (i.e. derivatives), and in some of which the method is explained without the use of dotted letters.

Both in 1665 and 1666 Trinity College was dismissed on account of the Great Plague of London. On each occasion it was agreed, as shown by entries in the "Conclusion Book" of the college, dated 7 August 1665, and 22 June 1666, and signed by the master of the college, Dr Pearson, that all fellows and scholars who were dismissed on account of the pestilence be allowed one month's commons.

Newton must have left college before August 1665, as his name does not appear in the list of those who received extra commons on that occasion, and he tells us himself in the extract from his commonplace book already quoted that he was "forced from Cambridge by the plague" in the summer of that year. He was elected a fellow of his college on 5 October 1667. There were nine vacancies, one caused by the death of Abraham Cowley the previous summer, and the nine successful candidates were all of the same academic standings. A few weeks after his election to a fellowship Newton went to Lincolnshire and did not return to Cambridge until the following February. In March 1668, he took his M.A. degree.

During the years 1666 to 1669 Newton's studies were very diverse. He bought prisms and lenses on two or three occasions, and also chemicals and a furnace, apparently for chemical experiments; but he also employed part of his time on the theory of fluxions and other branches of pure mathematics. He wrote a paper, De Analysi per Aequationes Numero Terminorum Infinitas, which he put, probably in June 1669, into the hands of Isaac Barrow (then Lucasian Professor of Mathematics), at the same time permitting him to communicate its contents to their common friend John Collins (1624–1683), a mathematician of no mean order. Barrow did so on 31 July 1669, but kept the name of the author a secret, and merely told Collins that he was a friend staying at Cambridge, who had a powerful genius for such matters. In a subsequent letter on 20 August, Barrow expressed his pleasure at hearing the favourable opinion which Collins had formed of the paper, and added, "the name of the author is Newton, a fellow of our college, and a young man, who is only in his second year since he took the degree of Master of Arts, and who, with an unparalleled genius (examine quo est acumen), has made very great progress in this branch of mathematics". Shortly afterward, Barrow resigned his chair and was instrumental in securing Newton's election as his successor.

Newton was appointed Lucasian professor on 29 October 1669. It was his duty as professor to lecture at least once a week in term time on some portion of geometry, arithmetic, astronomy, geography, optics, statics, or some other mathematical subject, and also for two hours in the week to allow an audience to any student who might come to consult with the professor on any difficulties he had encountered. The subject which Newton chose for his lectures was optics. These lectures did little to expand his reputation, as they were remarkably sparsely attended; frequently leaving Newton to lecture at the walls of the classroom. An account of their content was presented to the Royal Society in the spring of 1672.

During the year 1684, Edmund Halley visited the home of Newton. While on his visit, Halley noted the remarkable development Newton had conducted regarding the path of objects in space such as stars and planets. Newton was convinced to step forward and introduce his findings to the general public which soon became publicized. The publication, "Mathematical Principles of Natural Philosophy" introduced the three laws that Newton became famous for: law of inertia, summation of forces equals mass multiplied by acceleration and every action has an equal and opposite reaction.

Prior to Newton, there were several other philosophers who proposed ideas to describe the motion of celestial bodies. Kepler and Galileo Galilei often studied the way objects fell in order to gain an understanding of the motion of the planets. However, by putting his theories into laws, it was Newton who achieved the most success. Students learn these concepts in grade school, being applicable to every conceivable aspect of life.

In the year 1688, Newton was elected to the convention parliament at Cambridge University where he remained on board for two years. During his time at Cambridge, he was able to meet several famous people like John Locke and Nicolas Fatio de Duillier. Newton was able to form life-long bonds with these two figures in the matter of two years. Christiaan Huygens also came into the picture as Newton and him had disagreements in the past about gravity. The two figures had several extended arguments about their debate and were able to reach accord. Soon after, Newton entered a period of life where writing became his priority. He began by editing his book, Principia. Despite the adjustments he made, the new version of Principia was abandoned by the year 1693 due to Newton's mental state. He decaled himself as having a mental breakdown which eradicated the adjustments he made to his famous writing. Newton had a different novel that he worked on during the same time period called Praxis. This text consists of five drafts of literature written by Newton having to do with chemistry. During this period, Newton studied several areas of work including religion, calculus and chemistry.

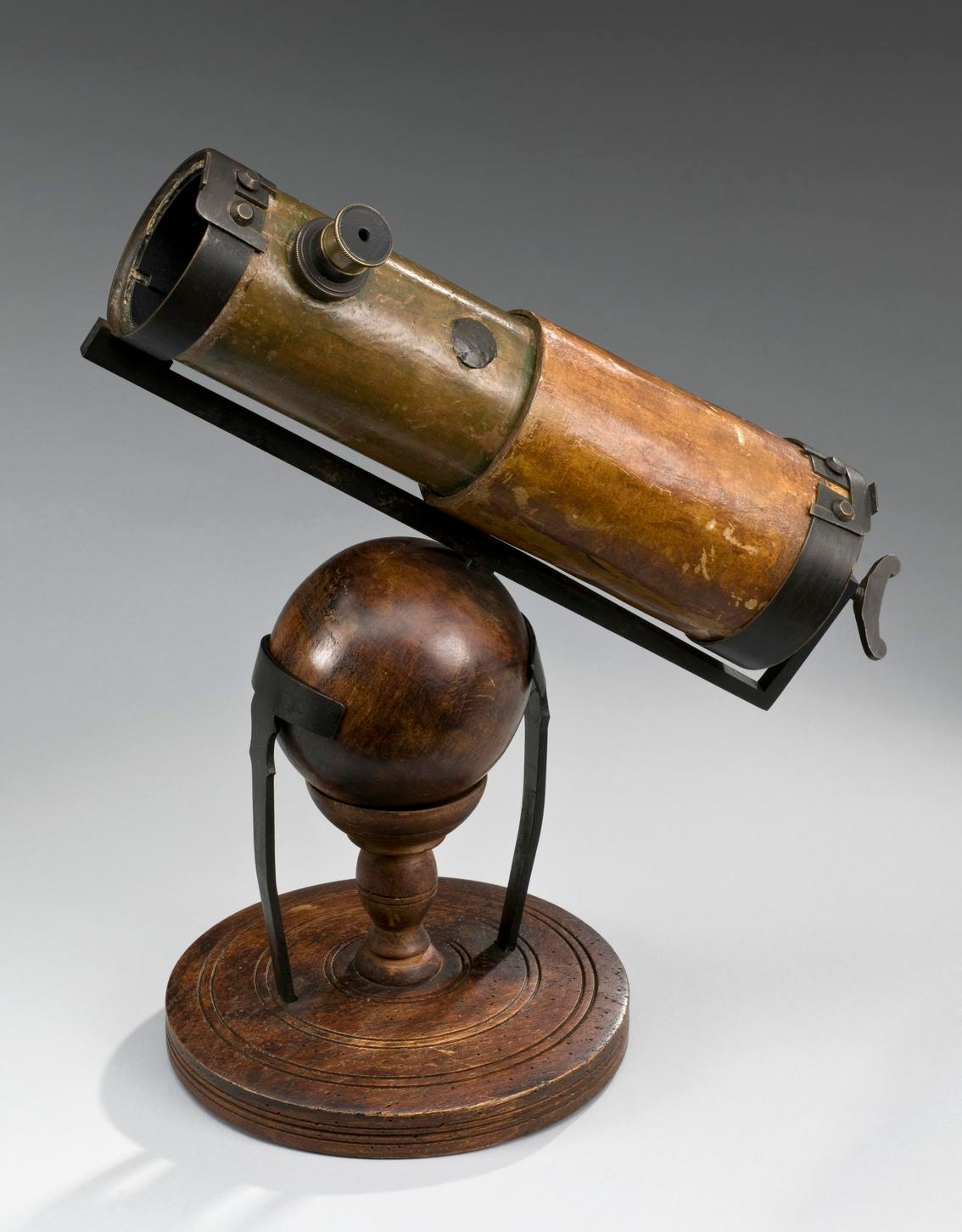
A replica of a second reflecting telescope Newton presented to the Royal Society in 1672 (the first one he made in 1668 was loaned to an instrument maker but there is no further record of what happened to it). It is described as the better of the instruments Newton built.

According to Alfred Rupert Hall the first practical reflecting telescope was built by Newton in 1668. Later on, such a prototype for its design came to be called a Newtonian telescope or Newton's reflector.

On 21 December 1671 he was proposed as a candidate for admission to the Royal Society by Dr. Seth Ward, bishop of Salisbury, and on 11 January 1672, he was elected a fellow of the Society. At the meeting at which Newton was elected, he read a description of a reflecting telescope which he had invented, and "it was ordered that a letter should be written by the secretary to Mr. Newton to acquaint him of his election into the Society, and to thank him for the communication of his telescope, and to assure him that the Society would take care that all right should be done him concerning this invention."

In his reply to the secretary on 18 January 1672, Newton writes: "I desire that in your next letter you would inform me for what time the society continue their weekly meetings; because, if they continue them for any time, I am purposing them to be considered of and examined an account of a philosophical discovery, which induced me to the making of the said telescope, and which I doubt not but will prove much more grateful than the communication of that instrument being in my judgment the oddest if not the most considerable detection which hath hitherto been made into the operations of nature."

This promise was fulfilled in communication which Newton addressed to Henry Oldenburg, the secretary of the Royal Society, on 6 February 1672, and which was read before the society two days afterward. The whole is printed in No. 80 of the Philosophical Transactions.

Newton's "philosophical discovery" was the realisation that white light is composed of a spectrum of colours. He realised that objects are coloured only because they absorb some of these colours more than others.

After he explained this to the Society, he proceeded: "When I understood this, I left off my aforesaid glassworks; for I saw, that the perfection of telescopes was hitherto limited, not so much for want of glasses truly figured according to the prescriptions of Optics Authors (which all men have hitherto imagined), as because that light itself is a heterogeneous mixture of differently refrangible rays. So that was a glass so exactly figured as to collect any one sort of rays into one point, it could not collect those also into the same point, which has the same incidence upon the same medium are apt to suffer a different refraction. Nay, I wondered, that seeing the difference of refrangibility was so great, as I found it, telescopes should arrive at that perfection they are now at." This "difference in refrangibility" is now known as dispersion.

He then points out why "the object-glass of any telescope cannot collect all the rays which come from one point of an object, to make them convene at its focus in less room than in a circular space, whose diameter is the 50th part of the diameter of its aperture: which is an irregularity some hundreds of times greater, than a circularly figured lens, of so small a section as the object-glasses of long telescopes are, would cause by the unfitness of its figure, were light uniform." He adds: "This made me take reflections into consideration, and finding them regular so that the Angle of Reflection of all sorts of Rays was equal to their Angle of Incidence; I understood, that by their mediation optic instruments might be brought to any degree of perfection imaginable, provided a reflecting substance could be found, which would polish as finely as glass, and reflect as much light, as glass transmits, and the art of communicating to it a parabolic figure be also attained. But these seemed very great difficulties, and I have almost thought them insuperable, when I further considered, that every irregularity in a reflecting superficies makes the rays stray 5 or 6 times more out of their due course, than the like irregularities in a refracting one; so that a much greater curiosity would be here requisite, than in figuring glasses for refraction.

"Amidst these thoughts, I was forced from Cambridge by the intervening Plague, and it was more than two years before I proceeded further. But then having thought on a tender way of polishing, proper for metal, whereby, as I imagined, the figure also would be corrected to the last; I began to try, what might be affected in this kind, and by degrees so far perfected an instrument (in the essential parts of it like that I sent to London), by which I could discern Jupiter's 4 Concomitants, and showed them diverse times to two others of my acquaintance. I could also discern the Moon-like phase of Venus, but not very distinctly, nor without some niceness in disposing of the instrument.

"From that time I was interrupted until this last autumn when I made the other. And as that was sensibly better than the first (especially for day-objects), so I doubt not, but they will be still brought to much greater perfection by their endeavours, who, as you inform me, are taking care of it at London."

=== Newton's theory of colour ===
After a remark that microscopes seem as capable of improvement as telescopes, he adds:

I shall now proceed to acquaint you with another more notable deformity in its Rays, were in the intermediate degrees of refrangibility. And this analogy twist colours, and refrangibility is very precise and strict; the rays always either exactly agreeing in both, or proportionally disagreeing in both.

Further on, after some remarks on the subject of compound colours, he says:

I might add more instances of this nature, but I shall conclude with this general one, that the colours of all-natural bodies have no other origin than this, that they are variously qualified to reflect one sort of light in greater plenty than another. And this I have experimented in a dark room by illuminating those bodies with uncompounded light of diverse colours. For by that means anybody may be made to appear of any colour. They have there no appropriate colour, but ever appear of the colour of the light cast upon them, but yet with this difference, that they are most brisk and vivid in the light of their daylight colour. Minium appears thereof any colour indifferently, with which 'tis illustrated, but yet most luminous in red, and so Bise appears indifferently of any colour with which 'tis illustrated, but yet most luminous in blue.

And there place a clear and colourless prism, to refract the entering light towards the further part of the room, which, as I said, will thereby be diffused into an oblong coloured image. Then place a lens of about three-foot radius (suppose a broad object-glass of a three-foot telescope), at the distance of about four or five foot from thence, through which all those colours may at once be transmitted, and made by its refraction to convene at a further distance of about ten or twelve feet. If at that distance you intercept this light with a sheet of white paper, you will see the colours converted into whiteness again by being mingled.

But it is requisite, that the prism and lens be placed steadily, and that the paper, on which the colours are cast be moved to and fro; for, by such motion, you will not only find, at what distance the whiteness is almost perfect but also see, how the colours gradually convene and vanish into whiteness, and afterward having crossed one another in that place where they compound whiteness, are again dissipated and severed, and in an inverted order retain the same colours, which they had before they entered the composition. You may also see, that, if any of the colours at the lens be intercepted, the whiteness will be changed into the other colours. And therefore, that the composition of whiteness be perfect, care must be taken, that none of the colours fall beside the lens.

He concludes his communication with the words:

This, I conceive, is enough for an introduction to experiments of this kind: which if any of the R. Society shall be so curious as to prosecute, I should be very glad to be informed with what success: if anything seems to be defective, or to thwart this relation, I may have an opportunity of giving further direction about it, or of acknowledging my errors, if I have committed any.

=== Controversies ===
The publication of these discoveries led to a series of controversies which lasted for several years, in which Newton had to contend with the eminent English physicist Robert Hooke, Anthony Lucas (mathematical professor at the University of Liège), Franciscus Linus (a physician in Liège), and many others. Some of his opponents denied the truth of his experiments, refusing to believe in the existence of the spectrum. Others criticised the experiments, saying that the length of the spectrum was never more than three and a half times the breadth, whereas Newton found it to be five times the breadth. It appears that Newton made the mistake of supposing that all prisms would give a spectrum of the same length; the objections of his opponents led him to measure carefully the lengths of spectra formed by prisms of different angles and different refractive indices, but he was not led thereby to the discovery of the different dispersive powers of different refractive substances.

Newton carried on the discussion with the objectors with great courtesy and patience, but the pain which these long discussions gave to his sensitive mind may be estimated from his letter of 18 November 1676 to Oldenburg: "I promised to send you an answer to Mr. Lucas this next Tuesday, but I find I shall scarce finish what I have designed, to get a copy taken of it by that time, and therefore I beg your patience a week longer. I see I have made myself a slave to philosophy, but if I get free of Mr. Lucas's business, I will resolutely bid adieu to it eternally, excepting what I do for my private satisfaction, or leave to come out after me; for I see a man must either resolve to put out nothing new or to become a slave to defend it."

These disputes did not damp Newton's ardour as much as he feared. He later published many papers in the Philosophical Transactions on various aspects of optics, and, although some of his views are erroneous, and are now almost universally rejected, his investigations led to discoveries which are of permanent value. He succeeded in explaining the colour of thin and of thick plates (diffraction), and the inflexion of light, and he wrote on double refraction, light polarisation and binocular vision. He also invented a reflecting quadrant for observing the angles between the Moon and the fixed stars— the same in every essential as the historically important navigational instrument more commonly known as Hadley's quadrant. This discovery was communicated by him to Edmund Halley in 1700 but was not published, or communicated to the Royal Society, until after Newton's death, when a description of it was found among his papers.

== Conflict over oratorship elections ==
In March 1673 Newton took a prominent part in a dispute in the university. The public oratorship fell vacant, and a contest arose between the heads of the colleges and the members of the Senate as to the mode of electing to the office. The heads claimed the right of nominating two persons, one of whom was to be elected by the senate. The senate insisted that the proper mode was by an open election. George Villiers, 2nd Duke of Buckingham, who was the chancellor of the university, endeavoured to effect a compromise which, he says, "I hope may for the present satisfy both sides. I propose that the heads may for this time nominate and the body comply, yet interposing (if they think fit) a protestation concerning their plea that this election may not hereafter pass for a decisive precedent in prejudice of their claim", and, "whereas I understand that the whole university has chiefly consideration for Dr Henry Paman of St John's College and Mr. Craven of Trinity College, I do recommend them both to be nominated." The heads, however, nominated Drs Paman and Ralph Sanderson (of St John's); the next day 121 members of the senate recorded their votes for Craven and ninety-eight for Paman. On the morning of the election, a protest in which Newton's name appeared was read and entered in the Regent House. But the vice-chancellor admitted Paman the same morning, and so ended the first contest of a non-scientific character in which Newton took part.

== Newton's poverty ==
On 8 March 1673 Newton wrote to Oldenburg, the secretary of the Royal Society:

"Sir, I desire that you will procure that I may be put out from being any longer Fellow of the Royal Society: for though I honour that body, yet since I see I shall neither profit them nor (because of this distance) can partake of the advantage of their assemblies, I desire to withdraw."

Oldenburg replied to this with an offer to apply to the Society to excuse Newton the weekly payments, as in a letter of Newton's to Oldenburg, dated 23 June 1673, he says, "For your proffer about my quarterly payments, I thank you, but I would not have you trouble yourself to get them excused if you have not done it already." Nothing further seems to have been done in the matter until 28 January 1675, when Oldenburg informed the Society that "Mr. Newton is now in such circumstances that he desires to be excused from the weekly payments." Upon this "it was agreed to by the council that he be dispensed with, as several others are."

On 18 February 1675 Newton was formally accepted into the Society. The most probable reason why Newton wished to be excused from these payments is that, as he was not in holy orders, his fellowship at Trinity College would lapse in autumn 1675, with a consequent reduction in his income. But he received a patent from the Crown in April 1675, allowing him as Lucasian professor to retain his fellowship without being required to take holy orders. This must have relieved Newton's financial worries since in November 1676 he donated £40 towards the building of the new library of Trinity College.

== Universal law of gravitation ==
It is supposed that it was at Woolsthorpe in the summer of 1666 that Newton's thoughts were directed to the subject of gravity. They are said to have been inspired by Newton's seeing an apple fall from a tree on his mother's farm, a version for which there is reasonable historical evidence. In one version of the story, the apple is supposed to have fallen on Newton's head; this version appears to have been invented by Isaac D'Israeli. Voltaire is the authority for the former version of the story. He had his information from Newton's favourite niece Catherine Barton, who married John Conduitt, a fellow of the Royal Society, and one of Newton's intimate friends. How much truth there is in what is a plausible and a favourite story can never be known, but it is certain that tradition marked a tree as that from which the apple fell, until 1866, when, owing to decay, the tree was cut down and its wood carefully preserved.

Johannes Kepler had proved by an elaborate series of measurements that

- each planet revolves in an elliptical orbit around the Sun, whose centre occupies one of the foci of the ellipse,
- that the radius vector of each planet drawn from the Sun sweeps out equal areas in equal times,
- and that the squares of the periodic times of the planets are in the same proportion as the cubes of their mean distances from the Sun.

The fact that heavy bodies always have a tendency to fall to the Earth, no matter at what height they are placed above the Earth's surface, seems to have led Newton to conjecture that the same tendency to fall to the Earth might have been the cause by which the Moon was retained in its orbit around the Earth.

Newton, by calculating from Kepler's laws, and supposing the orbits of the planets to be circles with the sun at the centre, had already proved that the force of the Sun acting upon the different planets must vary as the inverse square of the distances of the planets from the Sun. He was therefore led to inquire whether if the Earth's attraction extended to the Moon, the force at that distance would be of the exact magnitude necessary to retain the Moon in its orbit. He found that the Moon by its motion in its orbit was deflected from the tangent in every minute through a space of 13 feet (3.96 m). But by observing the distance through which a body would fall in one second at the Earth's surface, and by calculating from that on the supposition of the force diminishing in the ratio of the inverse square of the distance, he found that the Earth's attraction at the distance of the Moon would draw a body through 15 ft. (4.57 metres) in one minute. Newton regarded the discrepancy between the results as proof of the inaccuracy of his conjecture, and "laid aside at that time any further thoughts of this matter". (See Newton's cannonball.)

In November 1679, Robert Hooke (after his appointment to manage the Royal Society's correspondence) began an exchange of letters with Newton: he wished to hear from members about their researches, or their views about the researches of others. The correspondence later led to controversy. Hooke and Newton disagreed about the form of the path of a body falling from a height, taking the motion of the Earth around its axis into consideration. Newton later acknowledged that the exchanges of 1679–80 had reawakened his dormant interest in astronomy. This led Newton to revert to his former conjectures on the Moon. The estimate Newton had used for the radius of the Earth, which had been accepted by geographers and navigators, was based on the very rough estimate that the length of a degree of latitude of the Earth's surface measured along a meridian was 60 nautical miles. At a meeting of the Royal Society on 11 January 1672, Oldenburg, the secretary, read a letter from Paris describing the procedure followed by Jean Picard in measuring a degree, and specifically stating the precise length that he calculated it to be. It is probable that Newton had become acquainted with this measurement of Picard's, and that he was therefore led to make use of it when his thoughts were redirected to the subject. This estimate of the Earth's magnitude, giving 691 miles (1112 km) to 10°, made the two results, the discrepancy between which Newton had regarded as a disproof of his conjecture, to agree so exactly that he now regarded his conjecture as fully established.

In January 1684, Sir Christopher Wren, Halley and Hooke were led to discuss the law of gravity, and although they probably all agreed on the truth of the inverse square law, yet this truth was not looked upon as established. It appears that Hooke professed to have a solution of the problem of the path of a body moving around a centre of force attracting as the inverse square of the distance, but Halley declared after a delay of some months that Hooke "had not been so good as his word" in showing his solution to Wren and started for Cambridge, in August 1684, to consult Newton on the subject. Without mentioning the speculations which had been made, he asked Newton what would be the curve described by a planet around the Sun on the assumption that the Sun's force diminished as the square of the distance. Newton replied promptly, "an ellipse", and on being questioned by Halley as to the reason for his answer he replied, "Why, I have calculated it." He could not, however, put his hand upon his calculation, but he promised to send it to Halley. After the latter had left Cambridge, Newton set to work to reproduce the calculation. After making a mistake and producing a different result he corrected his work and obtained his former result.

Next November, Newton redeemed his promise to Halley by sending him, by the hand of Mr. Paget, a fellow of Trinity College and mathematical master of Christ's Hospital, a copy of his demonstration; and very soon afterward Halley again visited Cambridge to confer with Newton about the problem. On his return to London on 10 December 1684, he informed the Royal Society "that he had lately seen Mr. Newton at Cambridge, who had shown him a curious treatise De Motu", which at Halley's desire he promised to send to the Society to be entered upon their register. "Mr. Halley was desired to put Mr. Newton in mind of his promise for the securing this invention to himself, till he could be at leisure to publish it", and Paget was desired to join with Halley in urging Newton to do so. By the middle of February Newton had sent his paper to Aston, one of the secretaries of the Society, and in a letter to Aston dated 23 February 1685, Newton thanked him for "having entered on the register his notions about motion". This treatise De Motu was the starting point of the Principia, and was meant to be a short account of what that work was intended to embrace. It occupies twenty-four octavo pages, and consists of four theorems and seven problems, some of which are identical with some of the most important propositions of the second and third sections of the first book of the Principia.

== See also ==
- Ismaël Bullialdus
- De Motu (Berkeley's essay)
- Elements of the Philosophy of Newton
- Gauss–Newton algorithm
- History of calculus
- List of independent discoveries
- Newton's cannonball
- Newton disc
- Newton fractal
- Newton's inequalities
- Newton's laws of motion
- Newton's notation
- Newton polygon
- Newton polynomial
- Newton's religious views
- Newton series
- Newton's theorem of revolving orbits
- Newton (unit)
- Newton–Cotes formulas
- Newton–Euler equations
- Newtonianism
- Scientific Revolution
