= Arthur Storer =

American astronomer (1645–1687)

- Born: 1645; Lincolnshire, England
- Died: 1687 (aged 41–42); Calvert County, Province of Maryland
- Occupations: Gentleman, astronomer, and possibly apothecary
- Title: Dr.
- Parent(s): Edward Storer (father), Katherine Babington (mother), William Clarke (step-father)
- Relatives: Katherine and Edward Storer (siblings) Joseph, William, Anne, John and Martha Clarke (half siblings)

Arthur Storer (1645–1687) was a pioneering astronomer in colonial British America, remembered today chiefly for his association and correspondence with Isaac Newton. Storer was born in Buckminster, Leicestershire, England, but moved to Grantham, Lincolnshire shortly after, due to his widowed mother remarrying apothecary William Clarke who worked across the border. He eventually emigrated as an adult to Calvert County, in the Province of Maryland. He carried out careful astronomical observations using self-made instruments, and has been described as "the first astronomer in the American colonies" and as "Maryland's first scientist". His most notable observations were those of the Great Comet of 1680 and of the Comet of 1682 (later known as Halley's Comet). Storer shared his observations with Newton, who used them in his Philosophiæ Naturalis Principia Mathematica of 1687.

Storer's maternal uncle was the Rev. Humphrey Babington, who was the Anglican rector of Boothby Pagnell in Lincolnshire and a senior fellow of Trinity College, Cambridge. Storer's stepfather was William Clarke, who was the apothecary of Grantham and who provided lodgings to the adolescent Isaac Newton during his time as a student at The King's School, Grantham. Some sources indicate that Arthur Storer was also an apothecary, but no direct evidence of this has survived. The planetarium of Calvert High School, in Prince Frederick, Maryland, is named after Arthur Storer.

== Connection to Isaac Newton ==
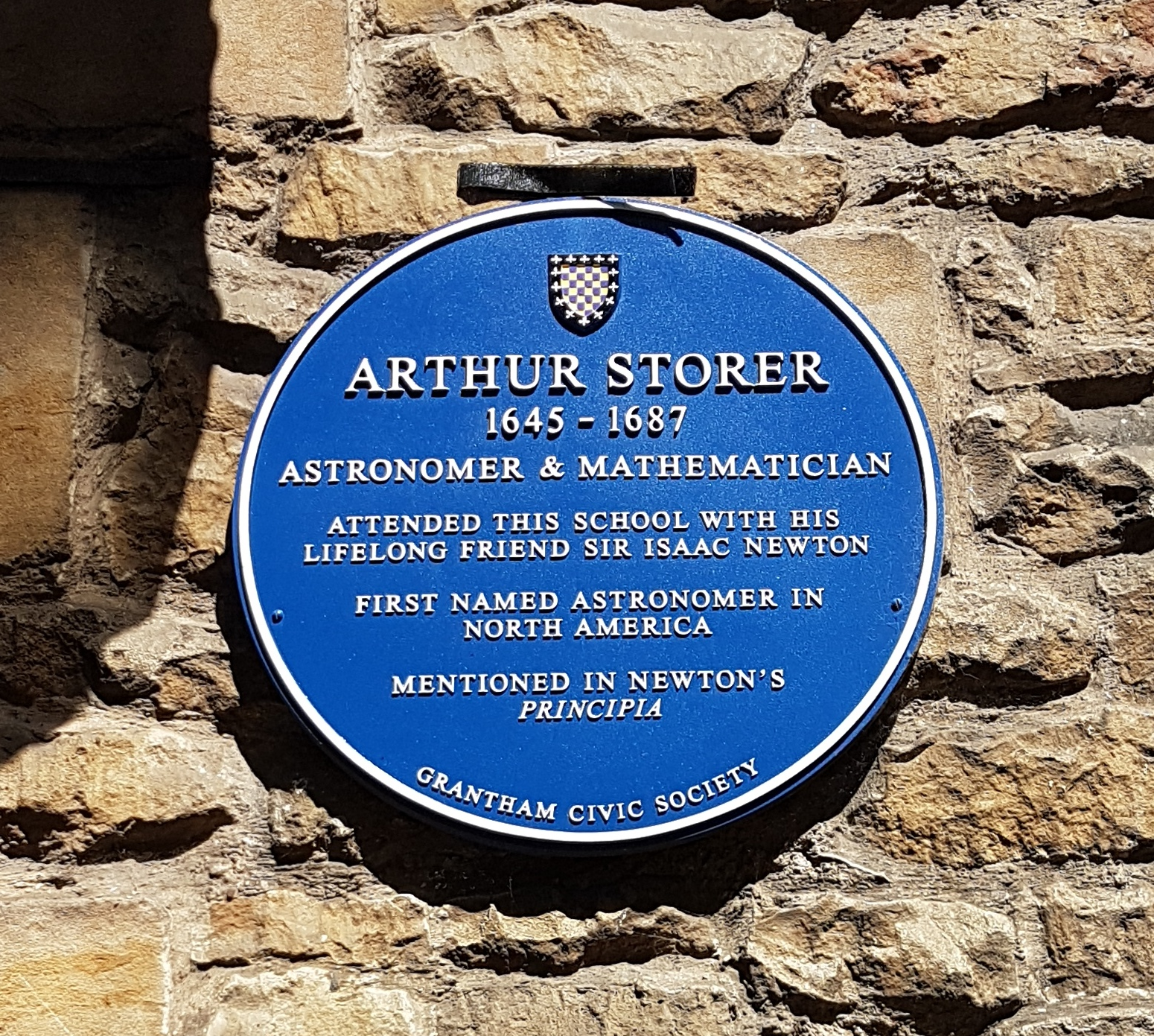
Blue plaque honoring Storer at The King's School, Grantham.

Arthur Storer was the son of Katherine née Babington, sister of the Rev. Humphrey Babington, who was rector of Boothby Pagnell, as well as senior fellow, bursar, and vice-master of Trinity College, in the University of Cambridge. After Katherine was widowed, she married William Clarke, an apothecary resident in Grantham, on the High Street next to the George Inn. Katherine brought to Clarke's household four children from her first marriage: Edward, Arthur, Katherine, and Ann. Newton and Arthur formed a close relationship.

At the age of 12, Isaac Newton was sent away from his home in Woolsthorpe to attend The King's School, Grantham. While there, he resided in the Clarke household, where he formed a connection with the Rev. Babington, who may later have encouraged Newton to attend Trinity College. Newton privately recorded, among the list of sins in his 1662 Fitzwilliam notebook, the act of "beating Arthur Storer". Many years later, Arthur's sister Katherine Storer claimed that the adolescent Newton shown a romantic interest in her. Storer maintained a correspondence with both the Rev. Babington and Isaac Newton even after he emigrated to the Province of Maryland at some point on or before 1672. Storer sent several letters to Isaac Newton holding data of the North star and other interests of his. Newton's Principia, first published in 1687, refers twice to the observations that Storer made of the Great Comet of 1680. Sadly Arthur never got to see the published acknowlegment of his work in Newton's Principia.

== Halley's Comet ==
After a fall from a horse in 1680, Storer was left in poor health and unable to travel far, but he continued his astronomical observations from Maryland. At about dawn on August 14, 1682, looking westward over the Patuxent River near Hunting Creek, Storer first noticed another comet, which remained visible until September 18, 1682. Storer's observations of that comet were second in accuracy only those carried out the Astronomer Royal John Flamsteed at the Royal Observatory, Greenwich. This is especially remarkable because Storer used a 12-inch quadrant that he had made himself out of wood. Later, Edmond Halley predicted on the basis of Newton's law of universal gravitation that this comet would approach the Earth again in 1758. After this prediction was confirmed, this comet came to known as "Halley's Comet".

== Ancestry ==
Arthur's ancestors in three generations
Arthur Storer (1645-1687)	Father: Edward Storer (b. abt. 1610)	Paternal Grandfather:	Paternal great-grandfather:
Arthur Storer (1645-1687)	Father: Edward Storer (b. abt. 1610)	Paternal Grandfather:	Paternal great-grandmother:
Arthur Storer (1645-1687)	Father: Edward Storer (b. abt. 1610)	Paternal grandmother:	Paternal great-grandfather:
Arthur Storer (1645-1687)	Father: Edward Storer (b. abt. 1610)	Paternal grandmother:	Paternal great-grandmother:
Arthur Storer (1645-1687)	Mother: Katherine Babington (b. 1613)	Maternal grandfather: Adrian Babinton (b. 1578)	Maternal great-grandfather: Humphrey Babington (b. 1544)
Arthur Storer (1645-1687)	Mother: Katherine Babington (b. 1613)	Maternal grandfather: Adrian Babinton (b. 1578)	Maternal great-grandmother: Margaret Cave (b. 1554)
Arthur Storer (1645-1687)	Mother: Katherine Babington (b. 1613)	Maternal grandmother: Margaret Cave (b. est. 1580-1610)	Maternal great-grandfather: Henry Cave (b. est. 1558)
Arthur Storer (1645-1687)	Mother: Katherine Babington (b. 1613)	Maternal grandmother: Margaret Cave (b. est. 1580-1610)	Maternal great-grandmother: Philippa Braham (b.c. 1560)
