= Stainby =

Hamlet in the South Kesteven district of Lincolnshire, England

Coordinates: 52.796475°N 0.65391°W

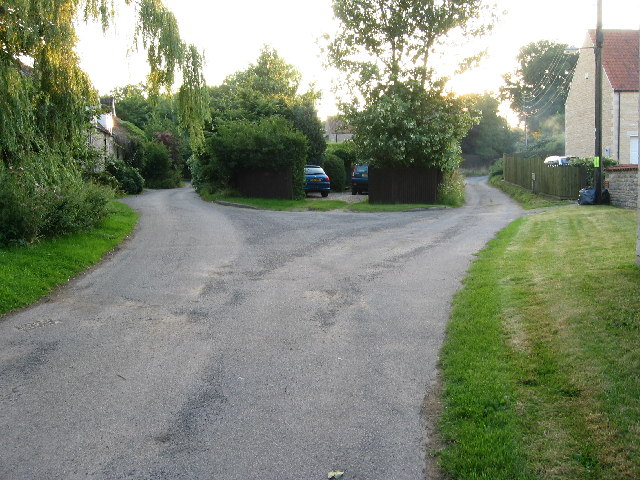
- Stainby village

- Location within Lincolnshire
- OS grid reference: SK908229
  - London: 95 mi (153 km) S
- Civil parish: Gunby and Stainby
- District: South Kesteven
- Shire county: Lincolnshire
- Region: East Midlands
- Country: England
- Sovereign state: United Kingdom
- Post town: GRANTHAM
- Postcode district: NG33
- Police: Lincolnshire
- Fire: Lincolnshire
- Ambulance: East Midlands
- UK Parliament: Rutland and Stamford

Stainby is a village and former civil parish, now in the parish of Gunby and Stainby, in the South Kesteven district of Lincolnshire, England. It is situated 2 miles (3.2 km) west from the A1 road, 1.5 miles (2.4 km) east from the Viking Way and the Leicestershire border, and 8 miles (13 km) south from Grantham. In 1921 the parish had a population of 117.

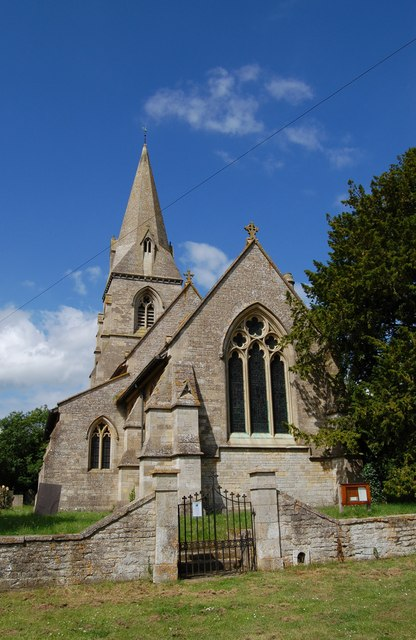
St Peter's Church, Stainby

Stainby is part of the civil parish of Gunby and Stainby, which is now administered as part of the Colsterworth district parishes. Stainby had been a parish in its own right until 1931. Adjacent villages include Buckminster, North Witham, Colsterworth, Gunby, Sewstern and Skillington.

Stainby is on the B676 road which runs between Melton Mowbray (Buckminster Road) and Colsterworth (Colsterworth Road). The road is used by heavy goods vehicles from the nearby industrial estate at Sewstern and by vehicles heading from the Midlands towards East Anglia; an alternative route is through Wymondham and South Witham.

There are no shops or public houses - the nearest are in Colsterworth. The church, on Main Road, is dedicated to St Peter. The former Stainby quarry is an event venue for vehicle off-roading.

== History ==
Stainby is recorded in the 1086 Domesday Book as "Stigandebi". The remains of a Motte, probably associated with the former Manor House, stand in the village. It is known as Tower Hill.

On 1 April 1931 the parish was abolished and merged with Gunby to form "Gunby and Stainby".

== See also ==
- Stainby railway station
