= Gunby, South Kesteven =

Hamlet in the South Kesteven district of Lincolnshire, England

Coordinates: 52.784°N 0.652°W

Gunby
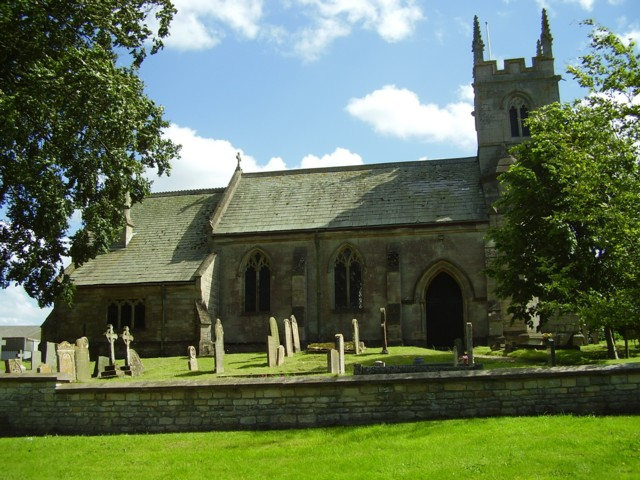
- Church of St Nicholas, Gunby

- Location within Lincolnshire
- OS grid reference: SK910216
  - London: 90 mi (140 km) S
- Civil parish: Gunby and Stainby
- District: South Kesteven
- Shire county: Lincolnshire
- Region: East Midlands
- Country: England
- Sovereign state: United Kingdom
- Post town: Grantham
- Postcode district: NG33
- Police: Lincolnshire
- Fire: Lincolnshire
- Ambulance: East Midlands
- UK Parliament: Grantham and Stamford
- Website: Parish Council

Gunby is a village and former civil parish, now in the parish of Gunby and Stainby, in the South Kesteven district of Lincolnshire, England. It lies close to the borders with Leicestershire and Rutland, 9 miles (14 km) south from Grantham, and 2 miles (3 km) west from the A1 road. In 1921 the parish had a population of 119. On 1 April 1931 the parish was abolished and merged with Stainby to form "Gunby and Stainby".

To the east is North Witham, to the north, Stainby, and to the west, Sewstern. The parish is administered by Colsterworth and District Parish Council, which covers a group of rural parishes.

The village name derives from a "farmstead or village of a man called Gunni", from the Old Scandinavian person name, and 'by', a farmstead, village or settlement.

Gunby's Grade II listed Anglican church is dedicated to St Nicholas. Of 15th-century origin, it was rebuilt by Richard Coad in 1869, although the Perpendicular tower remained.

The closest amenities are in Colsterworth, South Witham and Buckminster.

== See also ==
- Gunby in East Lindsey
