= Openfield =

British grain marketing and arable inputs co-operative

Openfield Group Ltd
- Type: Agricultural co-operative
- Industry: Arable agriculture
- Founded: 17 November 2008, through merger of Grainfarmers of south Hampshire and Centaur Grain of north Hampshire
- Headquarters: Colsterworth, South Kesteven, Lincolnshire, NG33 5LY
- Area served: UK
- Key people: James Dallas (Chief Executive); Philip Moody(Chairman)
- Products: Seed; Fertiliser; Grain; Storage
- Operating income: £555m (2023/4)
- Net income: £0.8m (2023/4)
- Website: Openfield

Openfield is a British grain marketing and arable inputs co-operative based in Lincolnshire. It is one of Britain's largest agricultural companies and Britain's only national co-operative in its field, with a turnover of over £550m. It markets grain for farmers and grain stores. In other countries, mainly Canada, this type of company is known as a wheat pool. The head office is based on the former RAF North Witham and prominent customers include some of the largest and well known British food and drink brands in the UK.

Openfield is a member of the Fertiliser Industry Assurance Scheme, and works with many fertiliser suppliers including CF, Glasson, ICL, Nitrasol, Omex, Origin, Timac and Yara. It is also a member of the Agricultural Industries Confederation.

== History ==
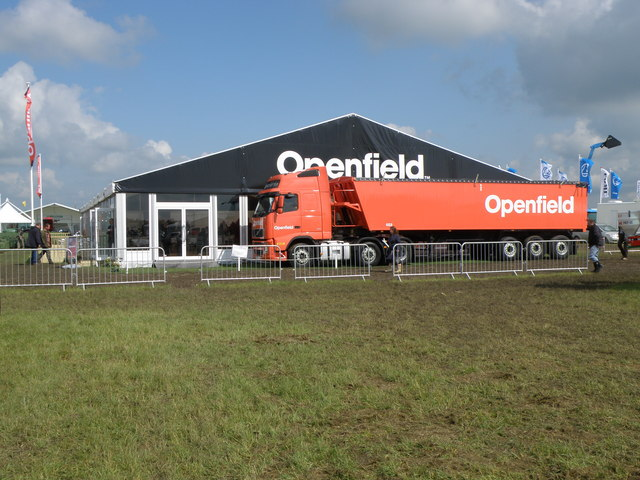
Openfield lorry at Cereals trade show, 2009

It was formed in November 2008 from the merger of Centaur Grain (of Andover) and Grainfarmers (of Micheldever, Winchester). It is now the largest UK farmer owned grain marketing co-operative and one of the largest companies in Lincolnshire, by turnover. The Colsterworth site opened in 1980.

=== Centaur Grain ===
Centaur had been formed in 2001 when Group Cereal Services (GCS) of South East England joined Lingrain of the East of England. It was based at Goodworth Clatford in north Hampshire.

=== Grainfarmers ===
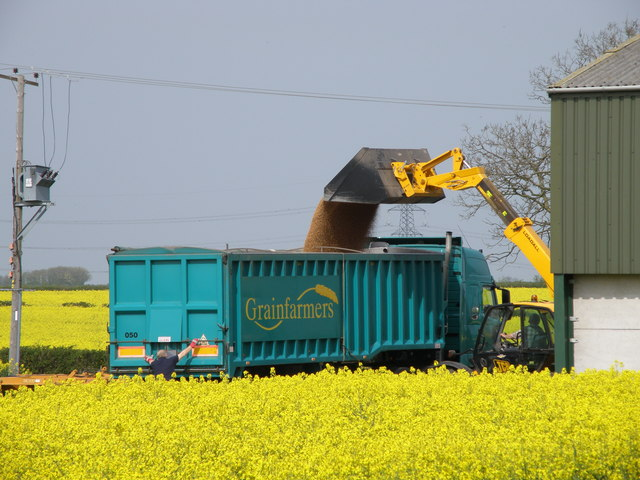
Grainfarmers lorry, Cambridgeshire

This began as the Southern Counties Agricultural Trading Society in 1907. It was renamed as Grainfarmers Group Ltd in 2003. It had offices in Aberdeen, Walton (near Wetherby), Bressingham, Bourne, LincsCompton Abdale, Cannington and Micheldever. It marketed over 17% of the UK's grain and represented over 4000 farmers.
