= Hannah Ayscough =

Mother of Sir Isaac Newton (1616–1679)

Hannah Ayscough or Askew or Askeu (Note: Spellings were not yet fixed at this point. The family appears in legal documents under various names. Please see bibliography given.) (circa 1616 - 1679) (Note: During this period lifetime, two calendars were in use in Europe: the Julian ("Old Style" calendar in Protestant regions, including Britain; and the Gregorian ("New Style") calendar in Roman Catholic Europe. At Hannah Ayscough's birth, Gregorian dates were ten days ahead of Julian dates. By the time of her death, the difference between the calendars had increased to eleven days. Moreover the civil or legal year in England began on 25 March.) was Isaac Newton's mother. She was born to a yeoman family near Grantham, in Lincolnshire. Following the death of her first husband, she inherited significant land and farm assets. Her second husband bequeathed her further wealth. She managed her farmland and attendant businesses successfully until her death, leaving all her wealth to her first son Isaac. Professor Yasmin Khan of Oxford University describes her as "an extraordinary 17th-century entrepreneur".

Notably, for sheep farming families of the time, though she herself was not educated, Hannah's brother, Rev William Ayscough, studied at Trinity College, Cambridge; her second husband attended Lincoln College, Oxford. Her son Isaac Newton (1643–1727) also went to Trinity College, Cambridge, becoming a Professor of Mathematics there (1669–1702) and President of the Royal Society (1703–1727). Unusually, for a 17th-century farming woman, she held independent wealth and managed her own lands. Aspects of her life are documented in Newton biographies, including notes from her contemporaries. Her home, Woolsthorpe Manor, is a Grade I listed building, now owned by the National Trust and is open to the public.

== Background ==
=== Marriage to Newton ===
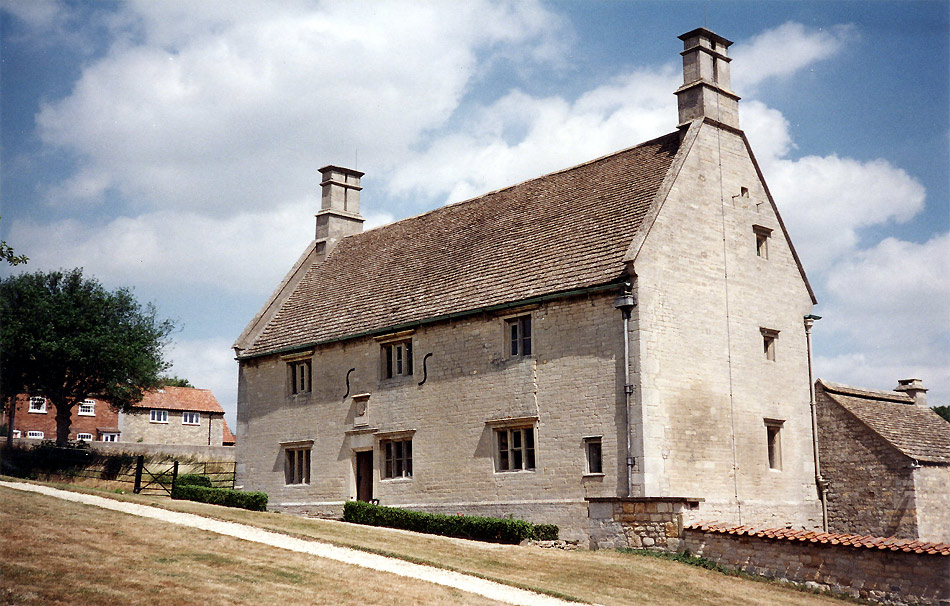
Woolsthorpe Manor

Hannah came from a prominent Lincolnshire family of yeomen - above common farmers and below gentlemen in status. Her father was James Ayscough; her mother was Margery, daughter of William Blyth. The couple married in 1609. Hannah had two brothers, both clergymen, William and James Ayscough.

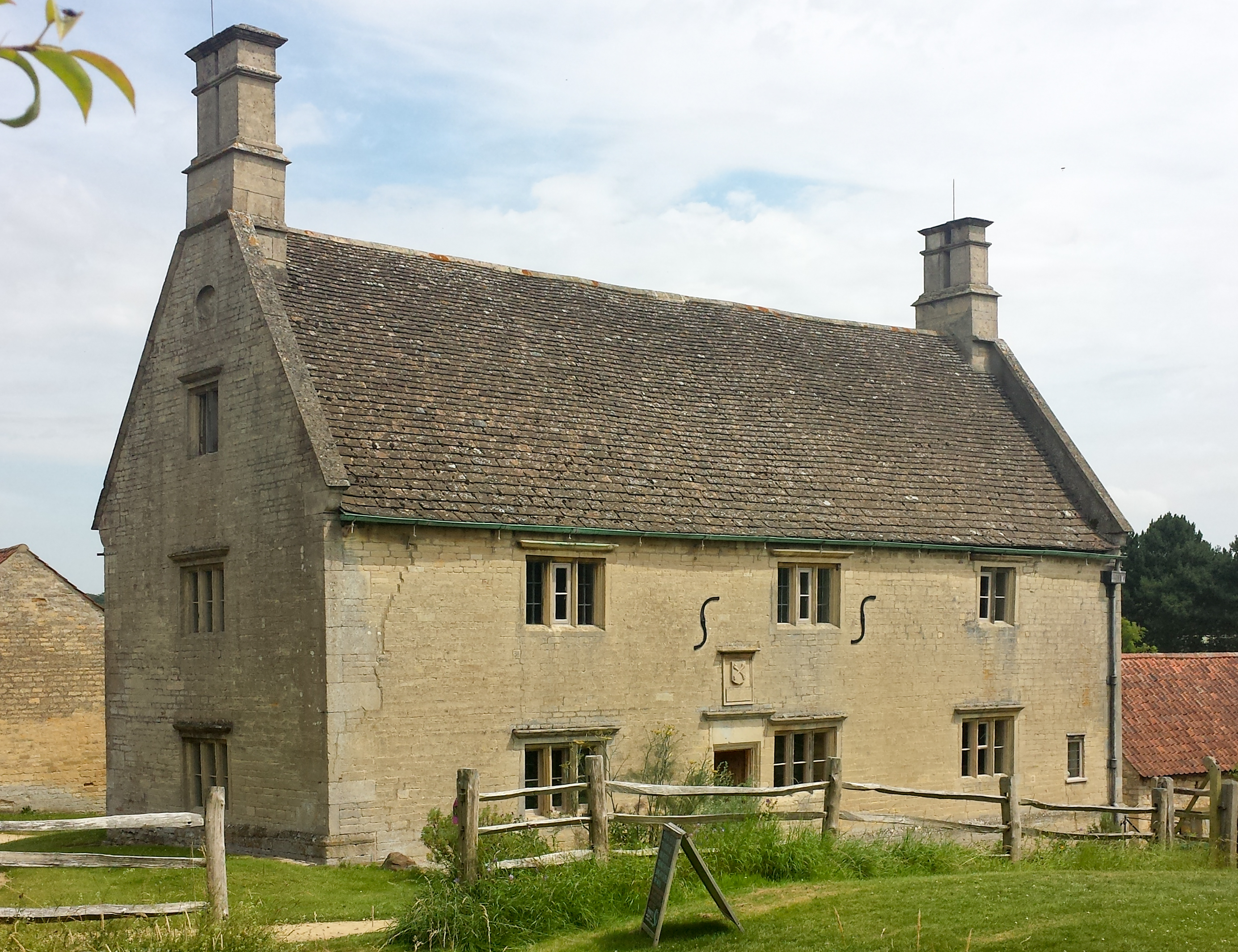
Woolsthorpe Manor, west facade

In 1642 Hannah married Isaac Newton (senior) (b. O.S 21 September 1606), from a similar family of prosperous yeomen local to the area. It seems the Newton family was uneducated and illiterate before this point and could not sign their name. As a dowry, Hannah brought with her a property in Sewstern in Leicestershire, whose land generated around £50 per year. Isaac Newton (senior) died in October 1642, aged 36, leaving his wife and son well provided for, as he had bequeathed everything to Hannah, at a total value of £495. This was much above the usual assets of a typical farmer or yeoman at the time. The bequest left her independently wealthy, enough to live a comfortable life with her son at the manor. Hannah ran the farmlands, managing the employment of the farm hands as they sheared, milked, lambed and fed the livestock. She oversaw the tilling of the fields and the sales of animals. Her land would have supported some tenant farmers and their families, living in farm cottages, which she managed and from whom she accrued rents. Historians disagree whether she was literate. In her own right, she bought lands in Buckminster.

Hannah's brother, William Ayscough, studied at Cambridge, graduating in 1630, before joining the clergy. He was rector of Burton Coggles, two miles from Woolsthorpe. (Note: C. W. Foster researched and published extensive works on the family of Isaac Newton Sr. He published details of the wills and asset lists of Hannah and her two husbands. Richard S. Westfall published the details of the will of Isaac Newton Sr in Never at Rest (1983). K. A. Baird (1987) has published details of the wills of Hannah's father, James Ayscough, and her brother. He also widely explored her possible antecedants and their history. Isaac Newton Jr died without making a will.) Hannah's connection to a highly educated family would have lent her status to the marriage, offering a "step upwards" to the Newton family. It is likely Isaac's uncle James inspired his nephew's love of study that gave rise to his career as a scientist and professor.

Isaac Newton (junior) was born at Woolsthorpe Manor, in 1643, Hannah's mother Margery, travelling to attend the birth. He was born in the early hours of Christmas morning, without a father, born two months prematurely and he was expected to die shortly after birth, so tiny as he was. It was said that two women from the manor "sat down on a stile, sure the child would be dead before they could get back". He may just have enjoyed telling dramatic stories about his early life, his birth presented as something of a miracle, however the story underlined that he was conceived in wedlock. Biographers note that the stories of his birth are plausible. It seems that, in adulthood, Isaac did not suffer in health or stature from his premature birth and infant struggles. Isaac was baptised on O.S 1 January 1643. The English Civil War was raging at the time. No record exists noting which side Hannah's family supported.

Biographer James Gleick describes Hannah's house at the time: "Medieval, in some disrepair, the Woolsthorpe farmhouse nestled into a hill near the river Witham. With its short front door and shuttered windows, its working kitchen and its floor of ash and linden laid on reeds".

=== Marriage to Smith ===
Three years later Hannah Ayscough, nearing 30, remarried, to clergyman and recent widower Barnabas Smith (1582–1653), a rich man of 63. Smith had attended Lincoln College, Oxford, though seems to have had no love of learning or study. The couple drew up a business contract before their marriage. The couple moved to Smith's long-standing home at North Witham, a mile and a half away. They left Isaac in the care of Hannah's mother, a loss that is described as "traumatic" for the young child. Biographer Michael White suggests that this move strikes us as heartless for Hannah to leave her child, however he comments that she may have viewed Smith as old and not likely to live long. As Smith had no children from his previous marriage, she may have imagined she would inherit all his wealth on his death and would be able to bequeath this to Isaac. On her death, she did indeed leave her entire, considerable estate, including Woolsthorpe Manor, to Isaac. Whether the separation of Hannah from her child was her idea or not, the loss of his mother from three years old, and the death of his father before his birth, is taken by biographers to have played a major role in shaping the "personality that emerges from the wreckage". Isaac was raised almost entirely within the Ayscough family. He grew to resent his mother, hated his step-father Smith and had very difficult relationships with women. It seems that Isaac did not get on well with either of Hannah's parents. Isaac was left as a legal guardian of one James Ayscough. It is not clear which family member this is, but it is likely to be Hannah's brother rather than her elderly father.

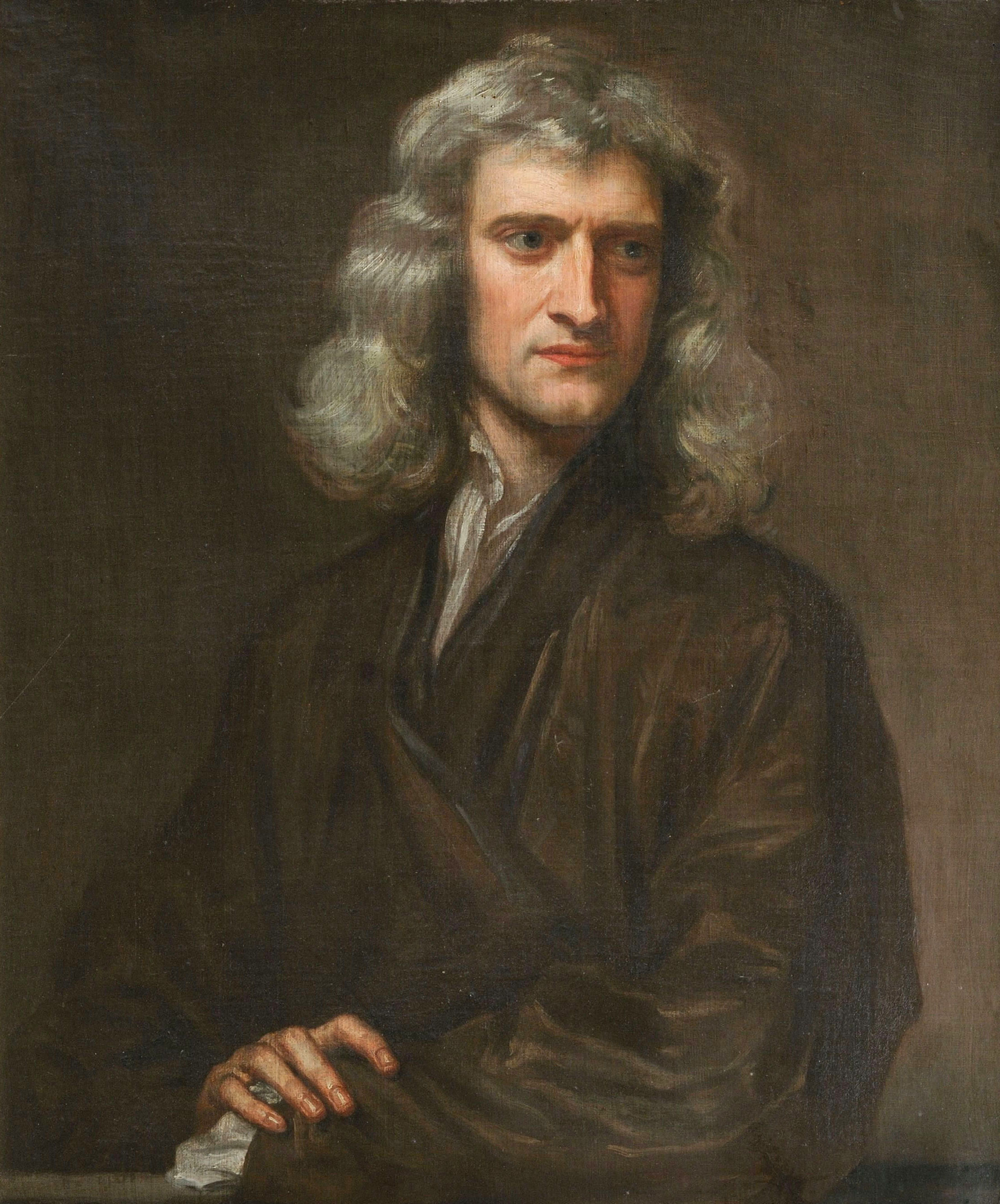
Isaac Newton (1689) painted by Godfrey Kneller

Barnabas and Hannah together had three of their own children, Mary (b.1647), Benjamin (b.1651) and Hannah (b.1652). After Smith's death at aged 71, in 1653, Hannah moved back with her three new children to Isaac and Woolsthorpe. Biographer White states that by this time "the rift between mother and son was too wide to ever heal properly".

In 1659 Hannah wanted to cease Isaac's education and she tried to make him into a farmer. Early biographer and family friend William Stukeley wrote "she thought fit to recall her son Isaac Newton from school, intending to make him serviceable to her, in management of farming & country business... but these employments ill suited Sr. Isaac's taste [sic]. (Note: The quote appears as written in the original source.)" Isaac's schoolmaster implored Hannah to let her son continue his education: "he never ceasd remonstrating to his mother what a loss it was to mankind, as well as a vain attempt, to bury so uncommon a talent, in admitted in 1660 rustic business. He was sufficiently satisfy'd that [Isaac] would become a very extraordinary man. At length, he prevailed with his mother to send him back to school". Isaac's uncle also supported his educational enthusiasm. Isaac attended Trinity College, Cambridge in 1661, graduating in 1665. He would stay there as a member for the next 42 years. Hannah was criticised for sending him there as a 'sizar', working in service to other students, even though she was a rich widow; however, she may well not have known the working of the college, and followed the manner of appointment her brother had experienced at Cambridge. The university temporarily closed during the years of the Great Plague and Isaac made visits back to Woolsthorpe and his mother between 1665 and 1667. Freed from the rigours of university life, he described his time there during this period as the most intellectually fruitful of his life - "a year of wonders", exploring and developing the science of optics, calculus, optics, the laws of motion and gravity. Hannah appointed Isaac legal head of her second family (Smith), though he rarely visited the family manor.

== Last years ==
In 1679 Hannah became ill, while in Stamford, possibly with smallpox. Isaac, now a fellow Cambridge University and Professor of Mathematics, nursed her. Early biographer and relation John Conduitt records:

"he attended her with true filial piety, sat up all nights with her, gave her all Physick [sic] himself, dressed all her blisters with his own hands & made use of that manual dexterity for which he was so remarkable to lessen the pain which always attends the dressing the torturing remedy usually applied in that distemper with as much readiness which he ever had employed in the most delightfull experments [sic]."

She was buried in a woollen shroud (as required by law), in St John's, Colsterworth, the parish church of Woolsthorpe. The burial was registered in that parish. Hannah's extensive will details her lands, chattels, stock and homes. She made sure her daughter would be provided for financially, if not yet married. When Isaac Newton died in 1727, he left no will. He had not married and the manor passed to his nearest male heir, John Newton and other bequests were left to his eight nieces and nephews. He had amassed a considerable estate through his mother, Hannah.

== Legacy ==
The Royal Society, with the Pilgrim Trust, purchased the manor house and gave it to the National Trust for preservation in 1942. Visitors can explore the house where Hannah lived for most of her life. In 2020 the National Trust purchased land in Beeson Close Field by Woolsthorpe Manor. The land was surveyed by South Witham Archaeology Group and the University of Leicester, searching for remains of a house that Hannah built sometime after 1653, next door to the manor house. The property may have been destroyed by fire in the early 1800s. In 2025 the National Trust ran a 'Festival of Archeology' in the field. The dig found such things as pottery, gaming tokens, thimbles, needles and buttons dating from the period of Hannah's life. The objects will be exhibited in the manor house from 2026. National Trust archaeologist Rosalind Buck noted:

The discoveries are such relatable objects and a real window into the domestic life of the Newton family. We can really imagine Hannah and the family eating from items like the Staffordshire slipware, or using jugs like the one with that magnificent, embossed face. Were people potentially gaming with jetton pieces while domestic tasks such as sewing and repairing clothes were being done nearby?”

Hannah's life and work are featured in the BBC series Digging for Britain (2026). It discusses her lands, goods, livestock inventory and her will in detail. The programme notes that she was owed large sums of money at her death, suggesting she was a money lender and made a business from this. Yasmin Khan, Professor of Modern History at Oxford University, describes her as "an extraordinary 17th-century entrepreneur".

Few letters are extant from Hannah to her son Isaac. One, sent from Woolsthorpe on 6 May 1665, is in the library of King's College, Cambridge.

== See also ==
- Catherine Barton

== Bibliography ==
- Isaac Newton (2004) James Gleick, Harper Perennial.
- Isaac Newton (2003) James Gleick, Pantheon Books
