= Gunby and Stainby =

Civil parish in Lincolnshire, England

Coordinates: 52.79°N 0.65°W

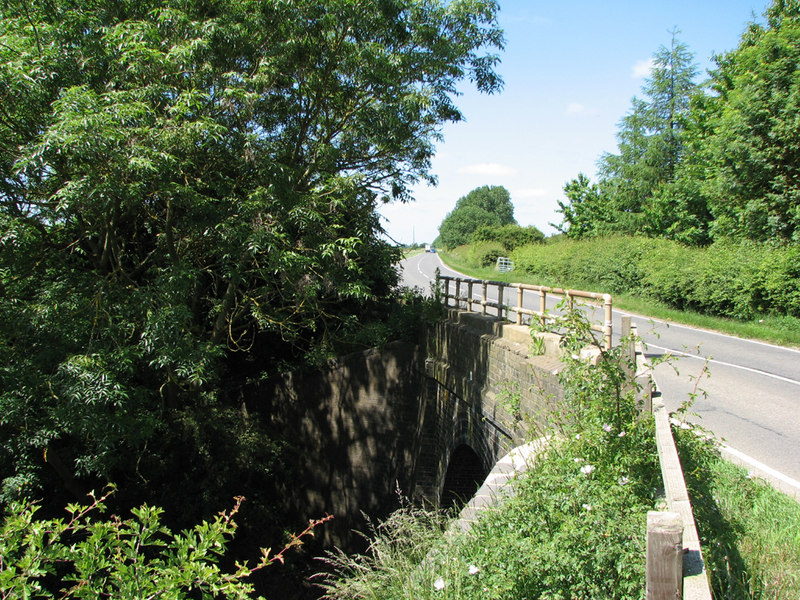
- The bridge at Stainby where the Ironstone trains passed under the railway

- Location within Lincolnshire
- Population: 136 (2011 census)
- Civil parish: Gunby and Stainby
- District: East Lindsey
- Shire county: Lincolnshire
- Region: East Midlands
- Country: England
- Sovereign state: United Kingdom

Gunby and Stainby is a civil parish in the South Kesteven district of Lincolnshire, England. According to the 2001 Census it had a population of 141, falling to 136 at the 2011 census. It includes the hamlets of Gunby and Stainby.

For administrative purposes parish affairs are handled by the combined Colsterworth District parishes council.

== History ==
The parish was formed on 1 April 1931 from "Gunby" and "Stainby" parishes.

== Geography ==
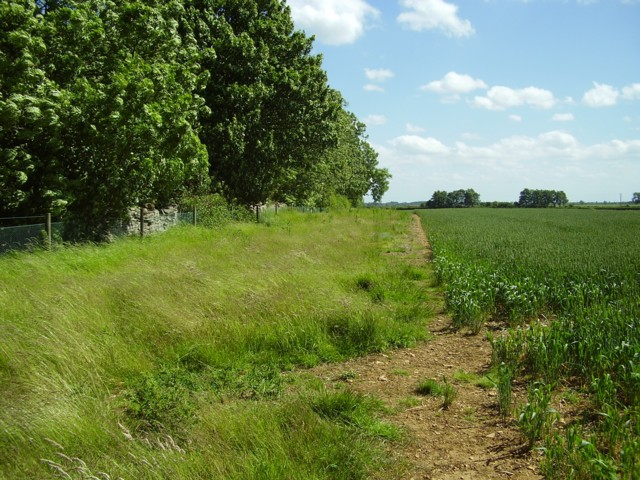
Stainby Warren, near Gunby

The only major road is the A151 Buckminster road which crosses the parish from west to east. The northern boundary lies some way north of, and very roughly parallel to this road.

The parish extends a considerable distance to the west of the villages, as far as the Lincolnshire-Leicestershire border, which forms the western edge. Out here all is farmland, over former Ironstone workings. The eastern extent reaches not quite as far as the A1 because the River Witham forms the boundary. The South is delineated by nothing more substantial than the ancient fieldlines dividing the parish from North Witham.

The land to the east, between Stainby and Gunby, is gently undulating around 125m above sea level. To the west, the contours are only about 10m higher. There is little woodland, Stainby Warren is perhaps the largest.

Stainby and Gunby are each founded around minor streams that flow from west to east into the River Witham, flowing north toward Colsterworth.

== Geology ==
The bedrock is mostly Jurassic sedimentary Ooidal ironstones of the Northampton Sand Formation. East of Gunby Road, Stainby and south of Gunby village it is Jurassic sedimentary limestone, of the lower Lincolnshire limestone series. The small streambed south of the Buckminster road is of Sedimentary Whitby mudstones, also dating back to the Jurassic.

=== Ironstone mining ===
The west of the parish was the site of Buckminster Quarries, site of extensive ironstone mining for around a hundred years. Operations ceased in 1972. A series of industrial railways linked to the High Dyke Branch with an end-on junction at Stainby. There is now little trace of the Ironstone workings.

== Community ==
Bus route 28 (Grantham-South Witham) serves both Stainby and Gunby at times to suit schoolchildren attending schools in Grantham.

== See also ==
- Rutland Railway Museum
