= Colsterworth =

Village in Lincolnshire, England

Coordinates: 52.80554°N 0.61825°W

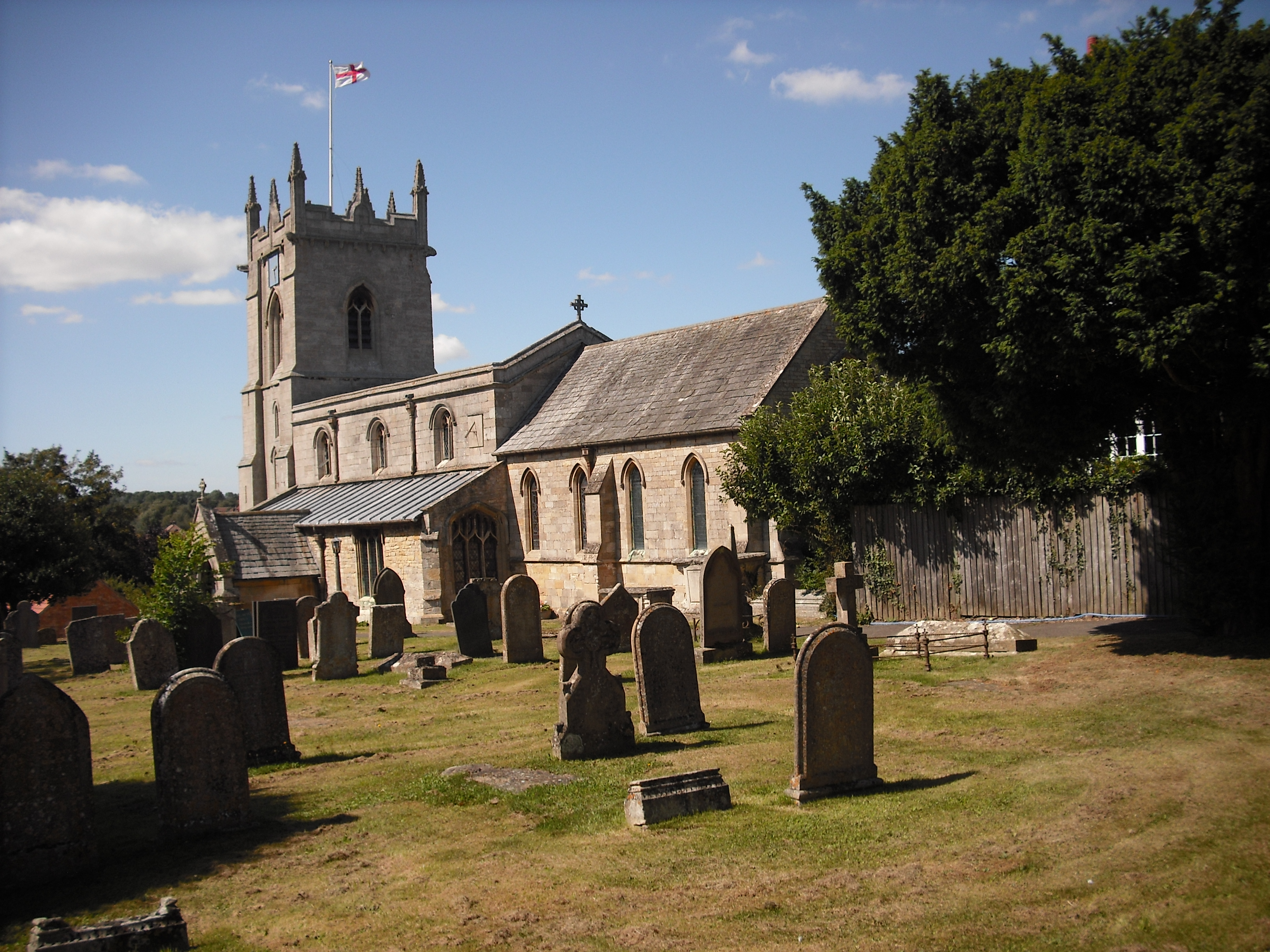
- Parish church of St John the Baptist

- Location within Lincolnshire
- Population: 1,713
- OS grid reference: SK932240
  - London: 90 mi (140 km) S
- Civil parish: Colsterworth
- District: South Kesteven
- Shire county: Lincolnshire
- Region: East Midlands
- Country: England
- Sovereign state: United Kingdom
- Post town: GRANTHAM
- Postcode district: NG33
- Police: Lincolnshire
- Fire: Lincolnshire
- Ambulance: East Midlands
- UK Parliament: Grantham and Stamford

Colsterworth is a village and civil parish in the South Kesteven district of Lincolnshire, England, less than half a mile (0.8 km) west of the A1, about 7 miles (11 km) south of Grantham, and 12 miles (19 km) north-west of Stamford. The village with the hamlet of Woolsthorpe-by-Colsterworth had a recorded population of 1,713 at the time of the 2011 census, in an area of 1,465 hectares (3,620 acres).

== Civil parish ==
The civil parish includes the village of Woolsthorpe-by-Colsterworth, 0.6 miles (1 km) north-west of Colsterworth. The parish shares a grouped parish council with Gunby and Stainby and North Witham, known as Colsterworth and District Parish Council.

=== Woolsthorpe-by-Colsterworth ===
Woolsthorpe-by-Colsterworth is notable as the birthplace of Sir Isaac Newton, his home, Woolsthorpe Manor, being a visitor attraction. Woolsthorpe-by-Colsterworth village hall was built as a result of an appeal in Newton's memory, and is named after him. Newton was christened at the parish church of St John the Baptist, where a copy of the entry in the register can be found.

== Heritage ==
The name Colsterworth is from the Old English 'colestre' + 'worth' for "enclosure of the charcoal burners"; the name appears as "Colsteuorde" in the Domesday Book.

The village dates from the Roman era. It is close to Ermine Street, the old Roman road that ran from London directly north to Lincoln and to the Roman road known as High Dyke. A Roman smelting furnace was found at Colsterworth in 1931, as was a small defended Late Iron Age settlement in the 1940s.

Colsterworth is raised upon a slight limestone ridge, with the River Witham running below on the western side and dividing the two villages. The old hamlet of Twyford has been incorporated by the growth of Colsterworth, but the name survives in the names of some houses and in Twyford Wood. The area between Colsterworth Church and Twyford was once known as Dunkirk. Colsterworth, Woolsthorpe and Twyford are all separately entered in the Domesday Book of 1086. The village belonged to the historical wapentake of Winnibriggs and Threo.

The enclosures of the land in 1808 allowed the local landlords to increase their holdings. Thirty villagers also received land, but some sold on to avoid the compulsory expense of fencing it. In Colsterworth the rector commuted his tythes for 398 acres, in addition to his 11 acres of glebe. The position of Colsterworth on the Great York Road, later the Great North Road, became important as soon as the turnpike road was completed in 1752. It was appointed a post town, and by the mid-19th century had a thriving coaching trade. There were numerous inns – ten at one point in time. However, the village was bypassed in 1935.

The old coaching inns have been transformed into houses or business properties, such as The George House and The Sun Pottery, or demolished completely. The White Lion public house, standing opposite the parish church of St John the Baptist, alone now serves the population.

Colsterworth lies one mile to the west of Twyford Wood, which was the site of a Second World War airfield RAF North Witham, and still retains military artefacts, including open runways and a derelict control tower. After the war, the grassed part of the airfield was planted with oaks and conifers. This grassland habitat is home to a regionally important colony of dingy and grizzled skipper butterflies.

In 1884 the Rev. J. Mirehouse, Rector of Colsterworth, was responsible for the Home Office Baby publicity stunt.

The former Lincoln City footballer Ayden Duffy was brought up in Colsterworth.

== Religion ==
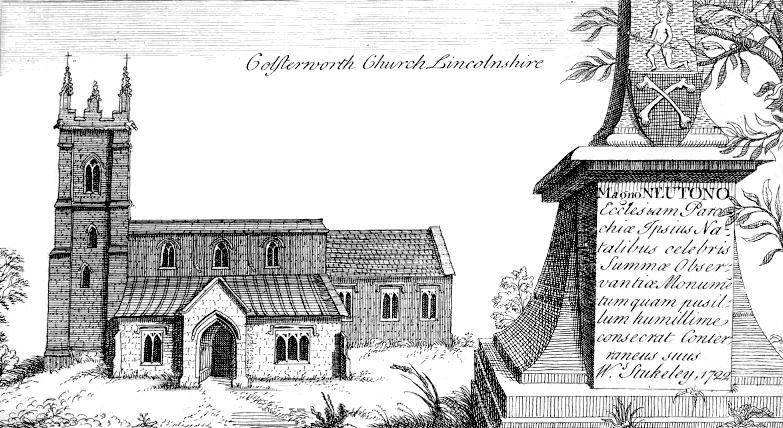
A drawing of St John the Baptist's church, by the antiquarian William Stukeley, 1722

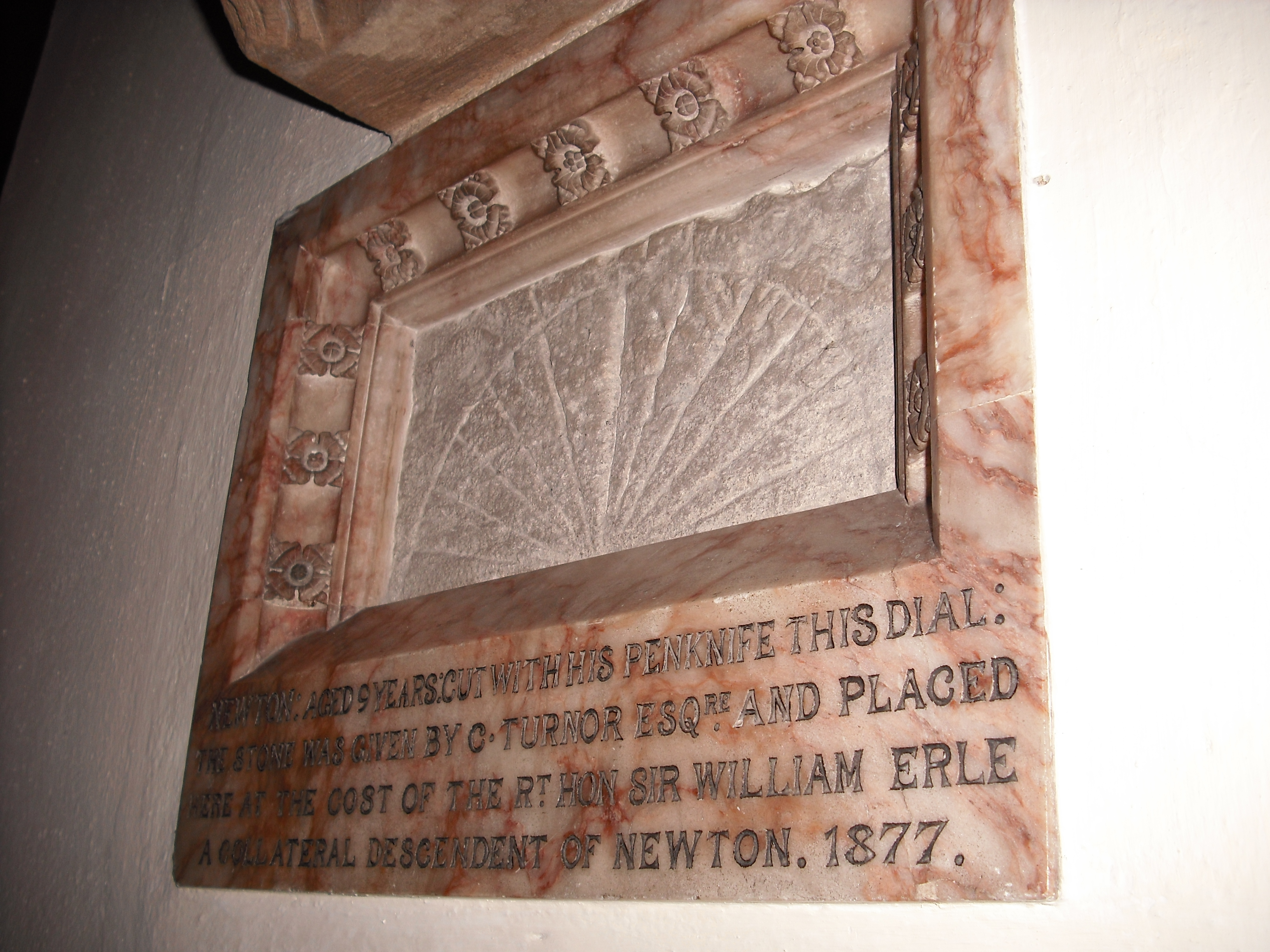
Memorial plaque with sundial plate, cut with a penknife by Isaac Newton in 1651, in St John the Baptist's church

The Church of England parish church of St John the Baptist has been a Grade I listed building since 1966. It goes back to Anglo-Saxon times, as indicated by the herring-bone stonework in the chancel. The Norman arches were preserved during Victorian restoration, of which this church is a prime example. The surrounding churchyard has been closed for almost a century, but is maintained by the parish council. Inside the church, behind the organ, is a stone sundial plate, cut with a penknife by Isaac Newton when he was nine years of age. The stone, which has no gnomon, is mounted upside down below a carved wooden effigy of the scientist. Newton's mother, Hannah Ayscough (died 1679) and father, also called Isaac (died 1642), were buried in the church.

St John the Baptist's belongs to the Colsterworth Group of Anglican churches, sharing a priest with Holy Cross at Great Ponton, St Guthlac's at Little Ponton with Woodnook, St James's at Skillington and St Andrew and St Mary's at Stoke Rochford with Easton. It is in the deanery of Beltisloe and the Diocese of Lincoln.

Methodism came to Colsterworth about 1795. The present Methodist church in Back Lane dates from the 1830s and is part of the Grantham and Vale of Belvoir Methodist Circuit.

== Economy and amenities ==
There is little employment in the village itself. During and for some time after the Second World War, work was available at the ironstone excavations, but after operations ceased in the 1970s, the site was filled and levelled. A tyre depot and a Christian Salvesen food cold-store offer local jobs. Farming, the traditional occupation that absorbed most of the workforce, still provides some employment, for instance at the Openfield grain cooperative on the former RAF station. There is work at fast-food restaurants OK Diner and Travelodge on the A1, and at the nearby Stoke Rochford Hall, a conference and function centre.

The village has a post office, a medical surgery, a Co-op store and a hairdresser, with greengrocer, butcher and fishmonger mobile shops. There is a mobile library service.

Other facilities in the village include a sports and social club, a village hall, a youth centre that doubles as a nursery, and three playgrounds. There is another village hall at North Witham.

Colsterworth's Church of England primary school also provides for children in neighbouring villages. It has about 100 pupils in five classes that span the seven years of primary education. The school is a "guardian school" for nearby Woolsthorpe Manor, the birthplace of Sir Isaac Newton. The new school buildings that opened in Back Lane in 1973 replaced earlier ones in School Lane, dating from 1824 and 1895.

The A1 trunk road at Colsterworth was redeveloped in 2010, when Colsterworth roundabout was removed and a road bridge over the A1 added for local traffic, to address safety and traffic congestion concerns. The village is on the bus route between Grantham and Witham.

== Dwellings and archive group ==
Although the oldest dwellings are of limestone, brick houses of the 1920s and 1930s are interposed amongst them. During the 1970s a large estate, Woodlands Drive, was built on ground previously belonging to Colsterworth House, which was demolished. The land between the village and the A1 was developed into a new housing estate. More recently, in 2009, a further housing development commenced on land previously utilised for steel storage and distribution, known as Newton Grange.

A village archive group was founded to record memories of Colsterworth people for posterity. The group's aim is to chronicle local social history and changes in dialect, and publish material as a resource and educational tool in book and DVD form. It has been funded by Lincolnshire Community Champions and the Local Heritage Initiative, now under the auspices of the Heritage Lottery Funding.
