= Woolsthorpe Manor =

Family home and birthplace of Isaac Newton

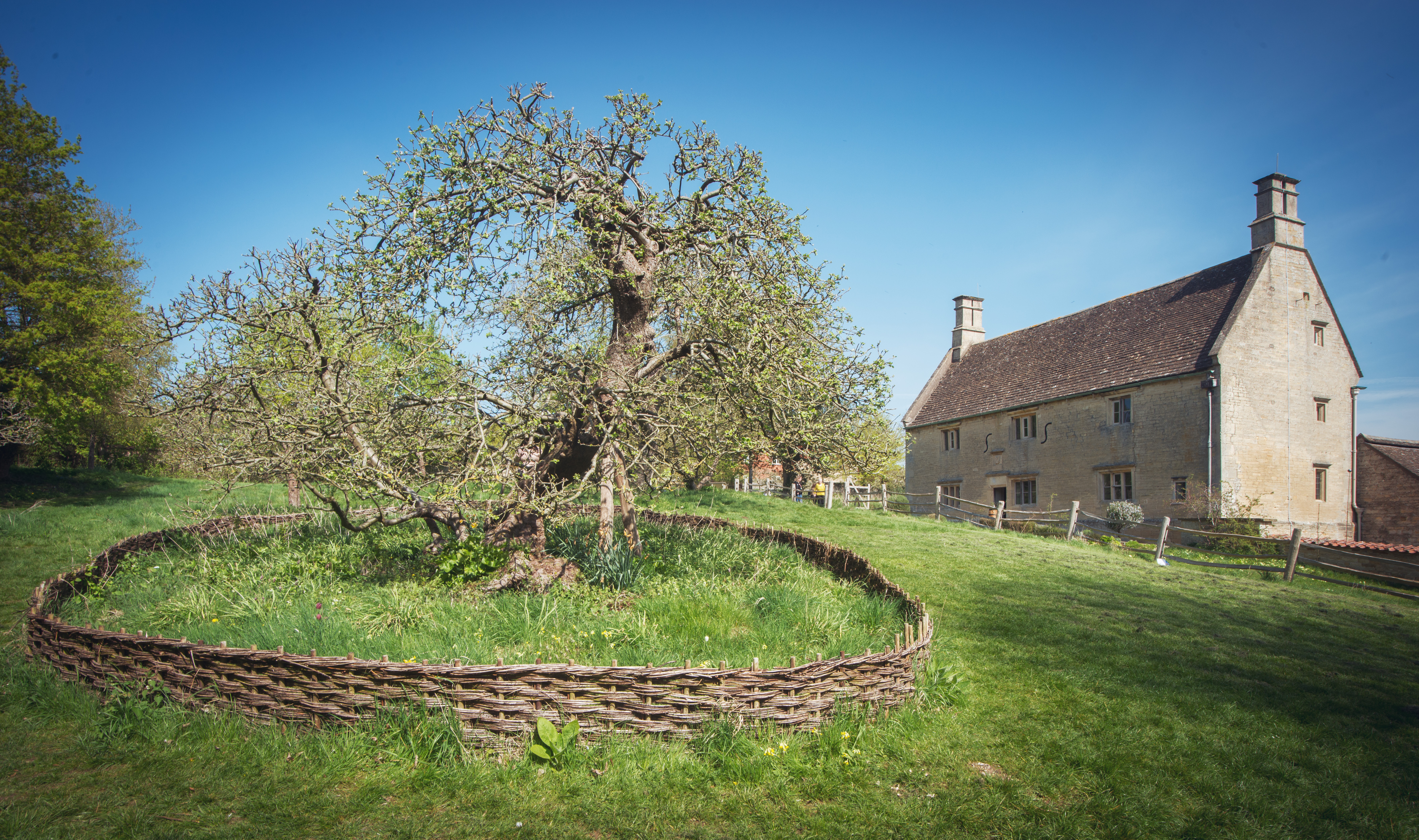
- Woolsthorpe Manor with Newton's Apple Tree in foreground

- Location within Lincolnshire

General information
- Type: Manor house
- Location: Woolsthorpe-by-Colsterworth, Lincolnshire, Woolsthorpe Manor House, Newton Way, Woolsthorpe-by-Colsterworth
- Coordinates: 52°48′33″N 0°37′50″W
- Years built: early 17th century early 18th-century
- Owner: National Trust

Website
- Woolsthorpe Manor

Listed Building – Grade I
- Official name: Woolsthorpe Manor House
- Designated: 19 February 1952
- Reference no.: 1062362

Woolsthorpe Manor in Woolsthorpe-by-Colsterworth, near Grantham, Lincolnshire, England, is the birthplace and family home of Sir Isaac Newton. In the orchard within the grounds is Newton's famous apple tree. A Grade I listed building, it is now owned by the National Trust and open to the public.

== History ==
=== Before Isaac Newton’s birth ===
Originally part of the estate of Colsterworth and still part of its ecclesiastical parish, by the twelfth century Woolsthorpe was a separate manor. It was the seat of various families including the Sleafords, the Pigotts, the Thimelbys, the Burys, and the Underwoods, who in 1623 sold it to Robert Newton, grandfather of Sir Isaac Newton. It was the Newton family's second property in Woolsthorpe, which Robert settled on his eldest son Isaac as a wedding gift in 1639. With the property went the title lord of the manor. However, by the 17th century the manorial rights had been largely eroded and the house acted more as a yeoman's farmstead, principally for rearing sheep. In April 1642 Isaac married Hannah Ayscough and died in October the same year, three months before the birth of his son.

=== Isaac Newton ===
Sir Isaac Newton was born in the house on Christmas Day 1642 (N.S. 4 January 1643) and was baptised on New Year's Day (11 January) in the nearby parish church of St John the Baptist, Colsterworth. At the age of three his widowed mother Hannah remarried and moved to North Witham a mile and a half away leaving Isaac to be raised by his grandparents, returning to Woolsthorpe after she was widowed a second time seven years later. When Newton was twelve he was sent to The King's School in Grantham and later worked with the local apothecary. He returned briefly at the age of 17; however, unsuited to and uninterested in life on the farm, he soon returned to Grantham and in 1661 at the age of 18 left Lincolnshire for Trinity College in Cambridge.

Newton returned to Woolsthorpe in 1666 when Cambridge University closed due to the plague, and performed many of his most famous experiments there, most notably his work on light and optics. This is also said to be the site where Newton, observing an apple fall from a tree, was inspired to formulate his law of universal gravitation.

=== After Newton ===
When Newton died in 1727 the manor passed to his nearest male heir, John Newton, his uncle Robert's great-grandson. In 1732 the estate was sold to the Turnor family, based at the nearby Stoke Rochford Estate, who leased the manor to a farming family named Woolerton. They remained the tenants for the next 200 years. In 1942 the manor was purchased by the Pilgrim Trust and the Royal Society who then gave it to the National Trust for preservation.

=== National Trust ===
Now in the hands of the National Trust and open to the public except in winter, it is presented as a typical seventeenth-century yeoman's farmhouse.

New areas of the house, once private, were opened up to the public in 2003, with the old rear steps (originally to the hay loft and grain store, often seen in period drawings) being rebuilt, and the old walled kitchen garden to the rear of the house being restored.

One of the former farmyard buildings has been equipped as an interactive visitor experience of the physical principles investigated by Newton in the house.

== The tree ==
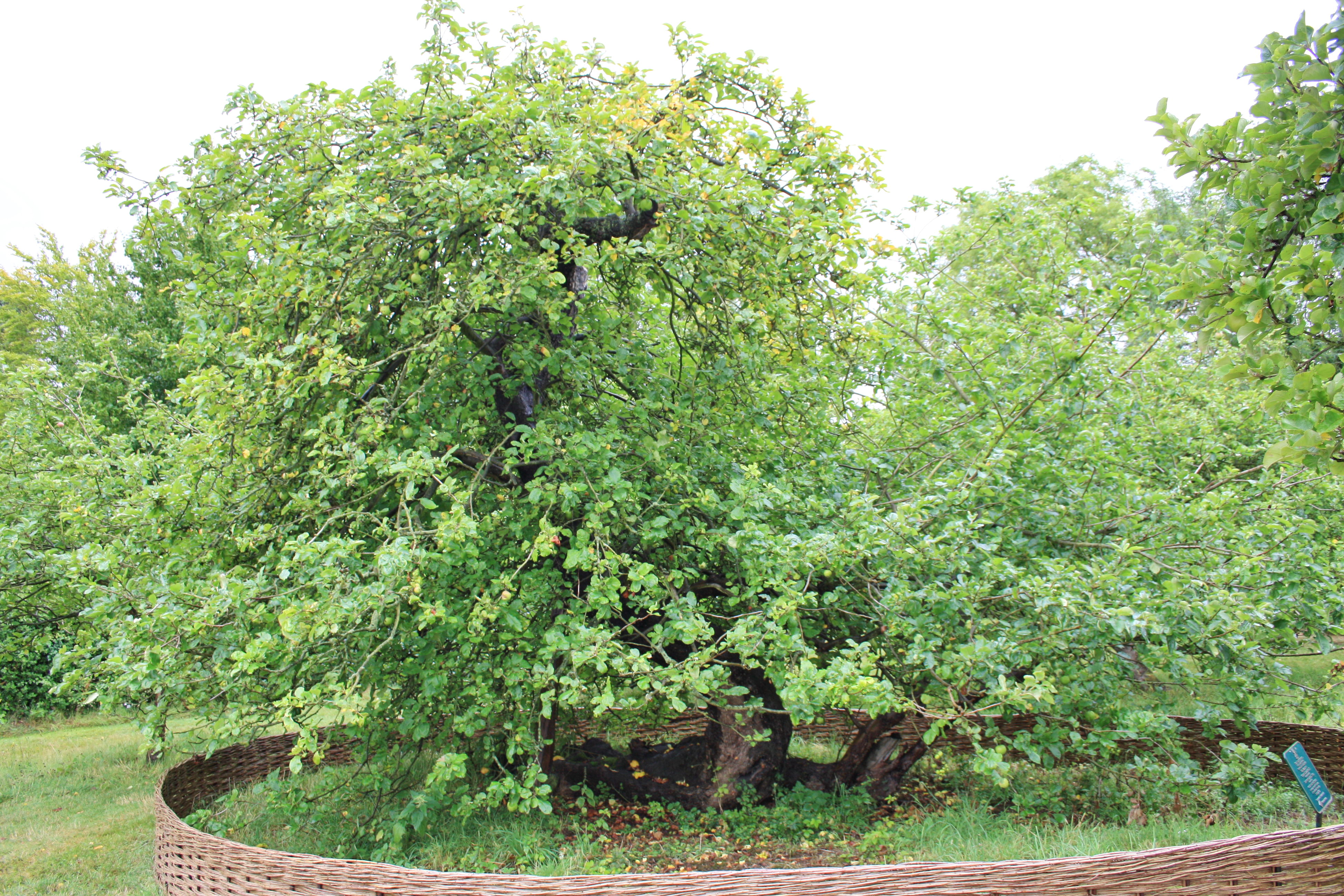
The tree from which the famous apple is said to have fallen

Isaac Newton recounted to his contemporary William Stukeley how an apple tree in the orchard inspired him to work on his law of universal gravitation. Dendrochronology confirms one of the trees in the orchard to be over 400 years old, having regrown from roots surviving from a tree which blew down in 1820. It is attended to by gardeners, secured with a fence, and cared for by the National Trust.

== The village ==
Woolsthorpe-by-Colsterworth (not to be confused with Woolsthorpe by Belvoir, also in Lincolnshire) has grown from a hamlet of several houses in the seventeenth century to a small village of several hundred houses today; much of the original land once owned by Woolsthorpe Manor was sold to a nearby family, and some of the immediate open land has since been built upon. Woolsthorpe Manor remains on the edge of the village and is mostly surrounded by fields.

== See also ==
- Isaac Newton's early life and achievements
