= William Clarke (apothecary) =

- Born: abt. April 1609; England
- Died: aft. 1 June 1671; Leicestershire, England
- Occupation: Apothecary
- Spouse(s): Martha (last name unknown) (1st); Katherine Babington Storer (2nd)

William Clarke (c. April 1609 – 1671) was an apothecary who provided lodgings for a young Isaac Newton whilst he attended the King's School in Grantham.

== Biography ==
William was baptised on 23 April 1609. According to his will, he had a brother Joseph, but little else is known about his early life. William Clarke was married twice, first to Martha (last name is unknown) who bore him three children - Joseph, William and Anne. His second marriage was to Katherine Babington, widow, who was from the same line as Anthony Babington. Katherine had three children from a previous marriage to Edward Storer, including daughter Katherine as well as sons Edward and Arthur Storer. Together, Katherine and William had two more children named John and Martha. All of his sons except John followed him into the trade of apothecary. Clarke eventually retired to Loughborough in Leicestershire, leaving his business to his son, William.

During the English Civil War, William sided with the parliamentarians. The town of Grantham was captured by Royalists on 23 March 1643 and on 11 April he was indicted for high treason. On 11 May 1643, however the town was recaptured by Oliver Cromwell and Clarke was released. Following the war William attained wealth and landholdings, but lost much of his fortune following the restoration.

== Association with Isaac Newton ==
In 1654, William provided boarding to Isaac Newton as he would be attending the King's School with Edward and Arthur Storer. Newton's mother remained in Woolsthorpe-by-Colsterworth, which was about eight miles away from the Clarke residence. Many of Newton's biographers have noted that it was the lessons learned from Clarke that sparked Newton's interest in chemistry.

According to the Clarke's grandson, Ralph Clarke, also an apothecary in Grantham, Newton left signs of his presence in the garret where he slept in the apothecary's house on Grantham's High Street: he carved his name into the boards, and drew charcoal drawings of birds and beasts, men and ships, and abstract shapes on the walls. Newton was said to have had 'a passion' for Clarke's step-daughter, Katherine Storer (later Mrs. Vincent).

== Sources ==
- E. T. Bell, Men of Mathematics (1937, Simon and Schuster)
- H. Eves, An Introduction to the History of Mathematics (1976).
- V. Horry, The Clark Family History. (2002)
- J. D. Trabue, "Ann and Arthur Storer of Calvert County, Maryland, Friends of Sir Isaac Newton, With the Descendants of Clarke Skinner of Calvert County" (2004).
