= North Witham =

Village in Lincolnshire, England

Coordinates: 52.7855°N 0.6260°W

- Location within Lincolnshire
- Population: 143 (2011 census)
- OS grid reference: SK915365
  - London: 90 mi (140 km) SSE
- District: South Kesteven
- Shire county: Lincolnshire
- Region: East Midlands
- Country: England
- Sovereign state: United Kingdom
- Post town: GRANTHAM
- Postcode district: NG33
- Dialling code: 01476
- Police: Lincolnshire
- Fire: Lincolnshire
- Ambulance: East Midlands
- UK Parliament: Rutland and Stamford

North Witham is a small village and nominally a civil parish in South Kesteven, Lincolnshire, England. The village is located along the upper course of the River Witham 1.5 miles downstream (north) of South Witham, and approximately 9 miles (14 km) south from the nearest major town, Grantham. It has an estimated population of 143 in around 72 households, at a density of 0.1/hectare.

The current civil parish of Colsterworth includes the hamlet of Lobthorpe. Nearby villages include Gunby, Colsterworth and Stainby.

The village is perhaps best known for its links with Isaac Newton, who is known to have lived nearby and visited the village on numerous occasions and made carvings in the wall of the church porch, and for the presence of nearby RAF North Witham.

== History ==
=== Toponymy ===
The origin of the name "North Witham" is uncertain, though the village appears in the Domesday Book of 1086 as "Widme" and then again in 1382 in the will of the village rector as "N Wythum." The origin of the name Witham is disputed however theories include the settlement being named after Wymund, an early settler in the area, or that the name was taken from the prefix "With" meaning willow and "ham" (the suffix appointed to Anglo-Saxon settlements widely believed to mean "village") which gives us With-ham: willow village.

=== Early history ===
No details are known of the village are known prior to the Domesday Book. However a Saxon clay loomweight from around 650 AD was found at Manor Farm in the village and is now being stored at the City and County Museum in Lincoln. It is believed that an Anglo-Saxon church existed on the site of the current church of St Mary. However no actual evidence of this has been found, other than a carved Anglo-Saxon cross in the Celtic style which can now be found in the church porch, and patches of herringbone brickwork within the current structure.

There are several traces of medieval farming in the village, and the site of a Shrunken medieval village.

=== The church ===
As mentioned above North Witham's Parish Church of St Mary is believed to have been first built in its current form in around 1086 by the Normans; however, evidence such as herringbone brickwork in the church wall suggests that perhaps at least some of the modern structure is Anglo-Saxon. The church attracts considerable attention because of its striking and unusual features, which include an original Norman doorway in the northern wall of the structure. It is thought that such a small village was provided with such an extravagant church because of the early residents of the area who included Countess Judith, niece of William the Conqueror, and Sortibrand, the local Thane.

The current tower and spire of the church were erected between 1380 and 1410; however, the current bells (a ring of three) weren't installed until around 1540. Also during the 15th century an arch between the vestry and the chancel was made leading into a room with a chamber above it. Local tradition states that the upper chamber was inhabited by the parish priest and above the archway there still remains a small hole through which the priest could check to see if the lamp above the altar was still lit. A side chapel was once present at the church; however, this was later destroyed and its foundation wasn't rediscovered until the restoration of the church in 1887. The side chapel is thought to have been where masses were said for the souls of the dead.

The next major changes to the church came in the 16th century when the English Reformation occurred and many of the church's ornaments, including a rood screen and a number of smaller items, were removed or destroyed. However, it was over this period, between 1530 and 1564, that the current church bells were installed in the spire. The most notable bell is "Catherine" which was installed prior to 1540 and bears the inscription "Principio fine sonans sonus hic sit Caterine" (May this sound of Catherine be sounding in the beginning (and) in the end.) The other two bells, which were installed later, bear the inscriptions "Hope wel have w(e)l" and "CelorumXte placeat tibi rex sonus iste" ("O Christ, King of Heaven, may the sound please Thee") respectively.

The Church contains a number of tombs of the Sherard family, who were influential in the area in the past, and also a helmet from a suit of armour thought to have belonged to the occupant of one of the tombs. The entirety of the suit of armour, or one similar to it, was present in the church well into the 20th century, however much of it was stolen by thieves.

Hannah Newton (born Hannah Ayscough), the mother of Isaac Newton, married Barnabas Smith the Rector of the parish on 27 January 1646 in his parish, and during the prohibited period for marriages. She moved to the rectory, staying there until August 1653 when her seventy-one-year-old husband died. Isaac's two half-sisters and half-brother were baptised in the parish, and probably born there. Graffiti accredited to the young physicist can still be seen in several places in and around the church.

=== Modern history ===
A total of 25 men are listed as having Served in the First World War on the North Witham Roll of Honour, it is thought that this may have been around one quarter of the village's total population. Four died in service, and 21 returned. A wall plaque to commemorate the dead was installed in the village church some time after the conflict.

A similar Roll of Honour in the church records the service of local people in the Second World War. It records 1 dead and 15 survived. The casualty was Sgt. Alfred Crompton. A third memorial records the additional death of Flt. Sgt Cyril Geeson in the war in the east.

On Good Friday 11 April 1941, a large raid intended for Grantham missed, and hit the North Witham area, with 35 high-explosive bombs, and many thousands of incendiary bombs, but largely no damage was caused.

On 21 February 1944 at 0650, a half mile south of the village, Lancaster III ND419 AR-O crashed, returning from Stuttgart, where it hit trees in a snow storm. The aircraft had flown five missions, flown by Pilot Officer Francis Cleveland. Seven airmen were killed in the crash, from Australian 460 Sqn. The crew are buried at Cambridge City Cemetery. The squadron lost 181 aircraft, and 1,018 aircrew, after dropping 24,856 tons of bombs.

On 2 February 1945 Halifax VII NP757 EQ-B of Canadian 408 Sqn, of 6 Group at RAF Skipton-on-Swale, crashed near the village. The starboard outer engine encountered trouble at 17,000ft, flying to Wanne-Eichel (Herne, North Rhine-Westphalia). The crew bailed out at 21.10, and the aircraft crashed with all bombs on board. It is not known where the crew parachuted. 109 Halifax aircraft were in the raid, dropping 675,000 lbs of high explosives; it largely missed the target, a synthetic oil refinery.

During World War II RAF North Witham was established near the village and the airfield was used by the USAAF later in the conflict. Following the end of World War II the airfield was closed, then used as an ammunition dump and test track for a time, before being donated to the Forestry Commission who still run the site under the name Twyford Wood.

=== October 1971 Canberra crash ===
On Tuesday 5 October 1971 at 9pm an aircraft from 98 Sqn landed at Lobthorpe; all ejected safely. Canberra WH973 had Fl Off Kenneth Woolford, the pilot, aged 27, from Birchington-on-Sea in Kent, who completed his training at RAF Feltwell in 1965, and was later a Vulcan pilot at RAF Waddington, and with 27 Sqn at RAF Scampton; Flt Lt W Woolley, 39 and married, of Bourne; and Fl Off G Edwards, 26, of Epsom. The aircrew were taken to RAF Nocton Hall.

== Governance ==
A Parish Council was traditionally responsible for local issues, however control was merged into the Parish council for Colsterworth in 2007 because of a lack of interest from villagers in North Witham itself. The North Witham Parish council had previously met in the village hall: a cricket pavilion from the nearby village of Great Ponton which was moved to North Witham in the early 1960s. Although effectively merged with Colsterworth, the civil parish has not been abolished and remains a separate legal entity.

At district level the village falls into the Morkery ward of South Kesteven and is current represented at the district council by the Conservative Party Councillor Margery Radley. North Witham falls into the Grantham and Stamford parliamentary constituency in the House of Commons of the UK Parliament.

== Education ==
Records suggest that a school existed in the village prior to 1857, however it wasn't until 1872 that a purpose-built school building was constructed by Browne's Hospital, Stamford. In September 1874 the school is recorded to have had 24 pupils, however by 1936 this had dropped to 14. During 1941 a German bomber, thought to have been under the illusion that it was above the nearby town of Grantham, bombed North Witham and completely destroyed the school. The remaining pupils continued to have lessons inside the rectory in the village until May 1942 when the six pupils were given places at South Witham and Colsterworth schools. Today children of a primary school age continue to attend the schools in the nearby village, however older children have to travel to nearby towns such as Grantham and Stamford to continue their education.

== Community ==
In the past the parish contained two public houses, the Plough Inn and the Black Bull, however both were closed in the 20th century. A village shop was opened in the village hall during the 1980s, but closed after two years. A previous telephone box was removed by British Telecom in 2007 after it was vandalised; a post box from the reign of King George VI is still in place.

A Camping and Caravanning Club certified campsite is used by caravanners as a stopping-off point when using the nearby A1 road.

The village is on the route of the No.28 bus between Grantham and South Witham.

== Gallery ==
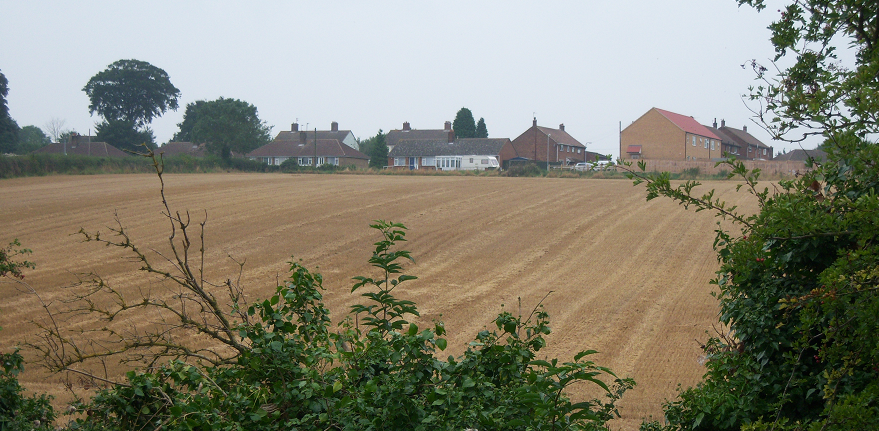
A view of the newer area of the village, the majority of houses in the photo were constructed in the 1950s however three new terrace houses can be seen on the right.

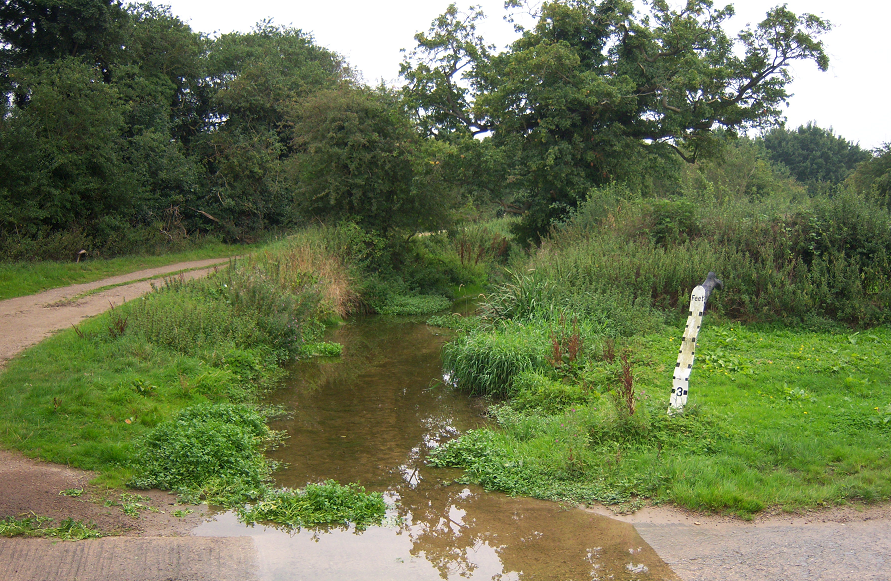
The River Witham from the footbridge outside of North Witham, a ford can be seen in the foreground.

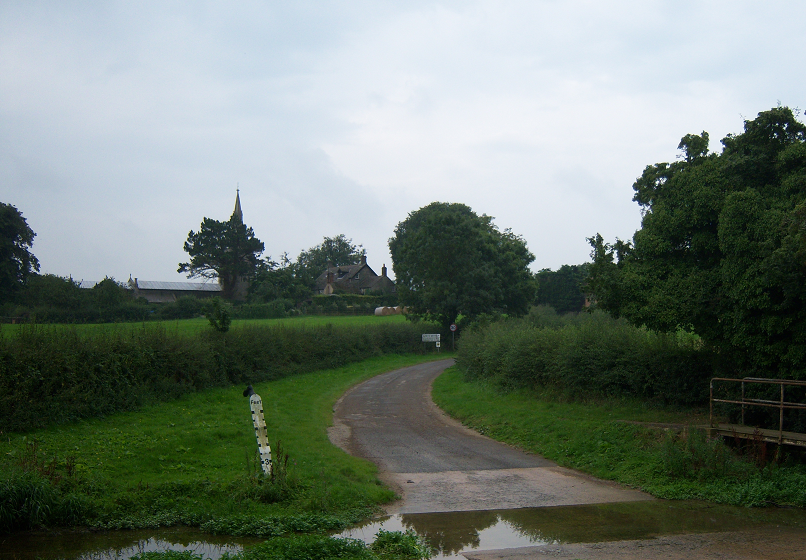
North Witham from the south side of the River Witham which is visible in the foreground. This photo shows the changes that have occurred in the village over the last 50 years when compared to the painting from the 1950s seen elsewhere in this article.

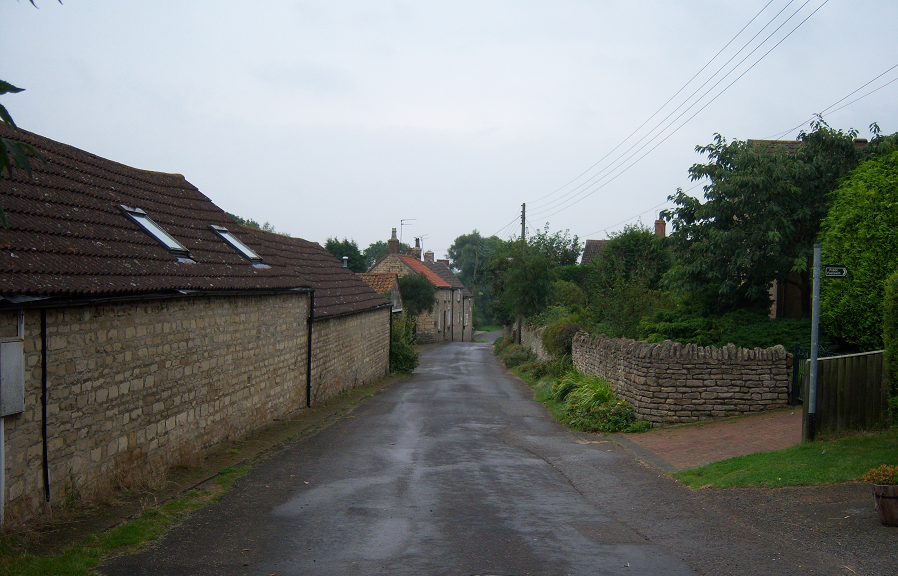
An older area of the village of North Witham, the converted barns of the manor house can be seen on the left.

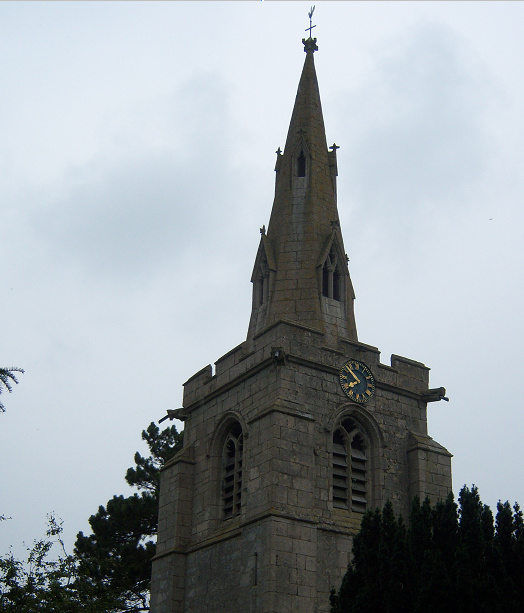
North Witham's Parish church of St Mary's seen from the churchyard.

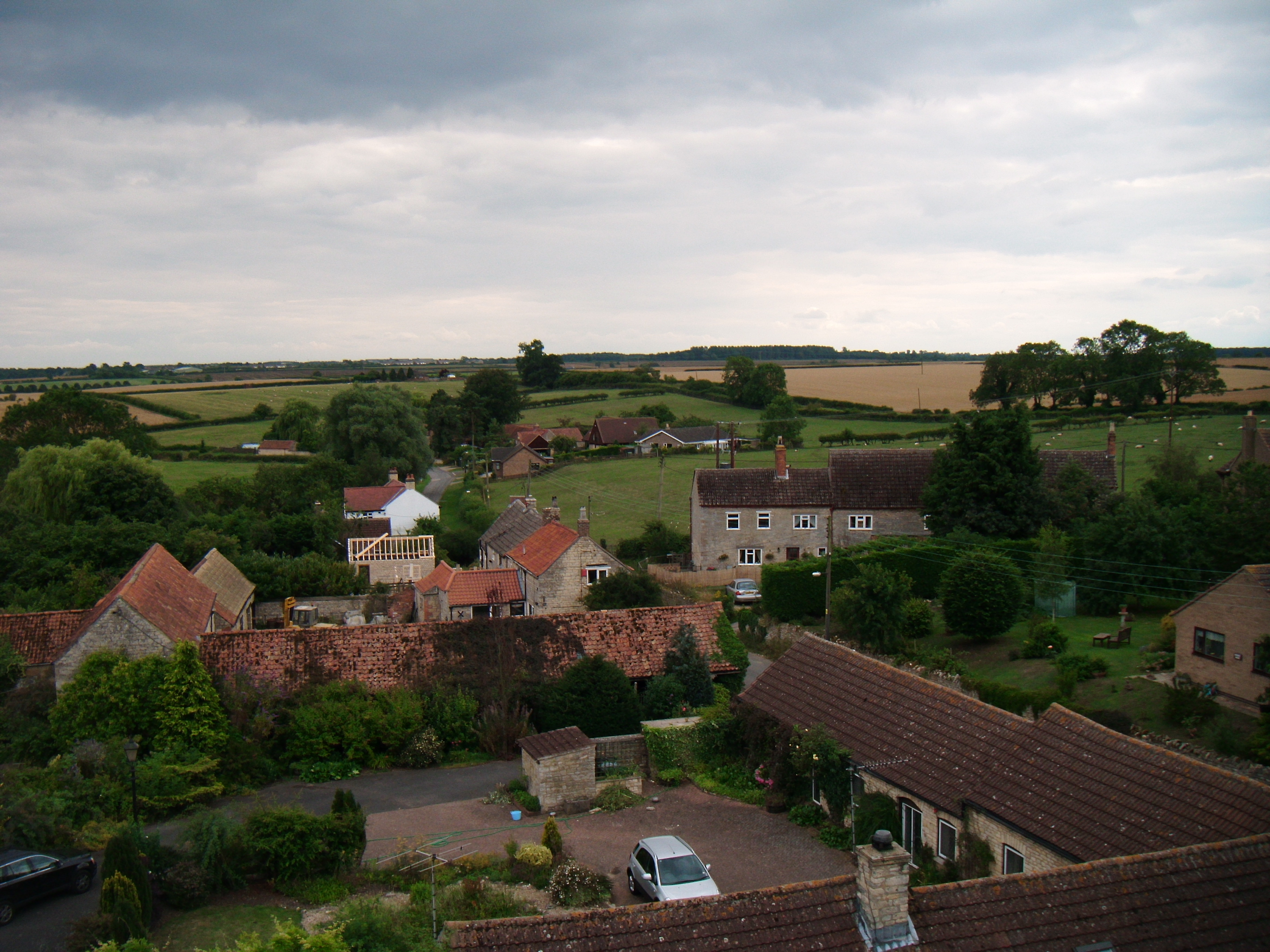
A view from the top of the church tower over the village towards the A1 motorway.

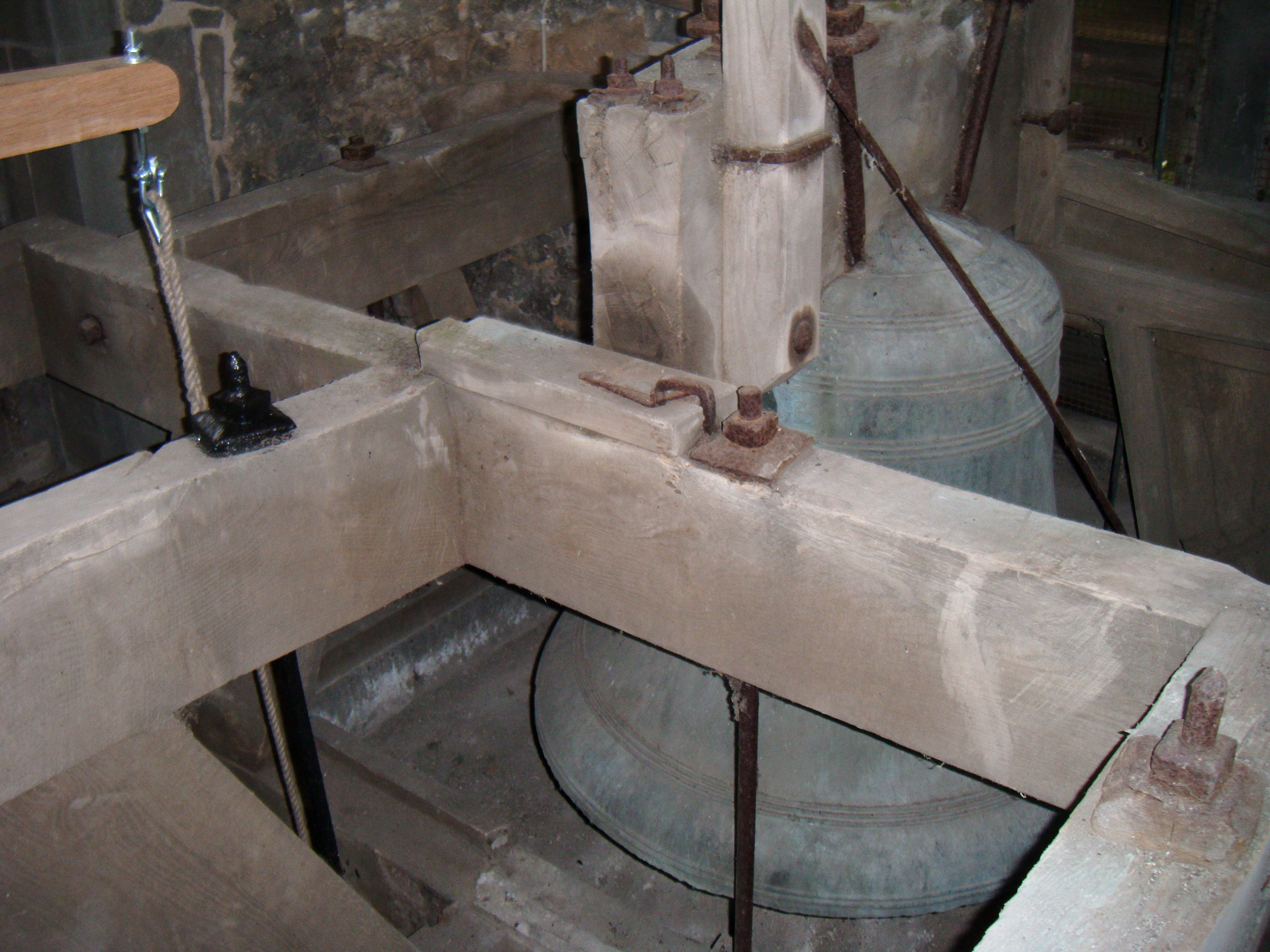
One of the two smaller bells at the church installed in 1564.

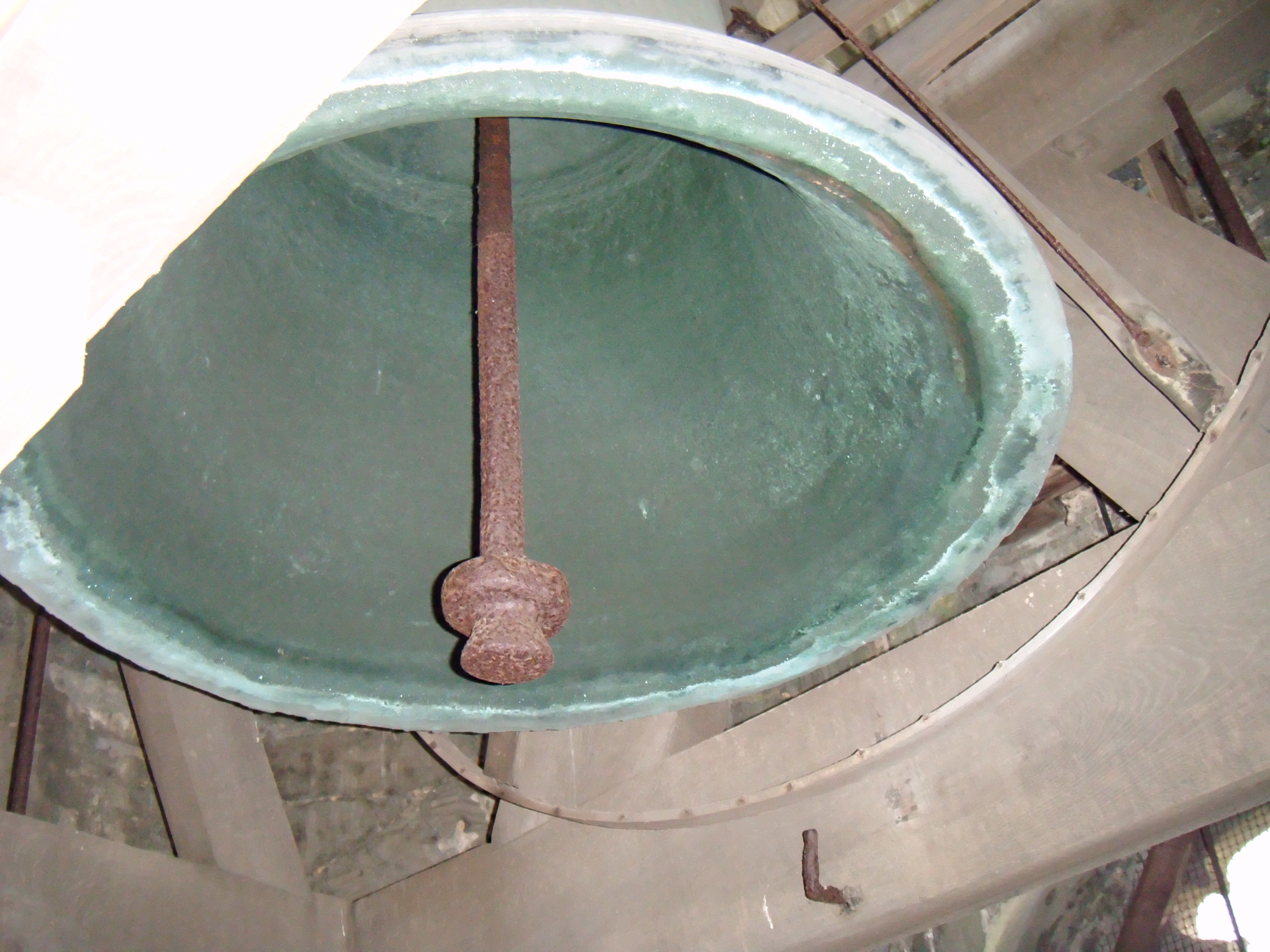
The largest of the three bells in the church tower, named as "Catherine"

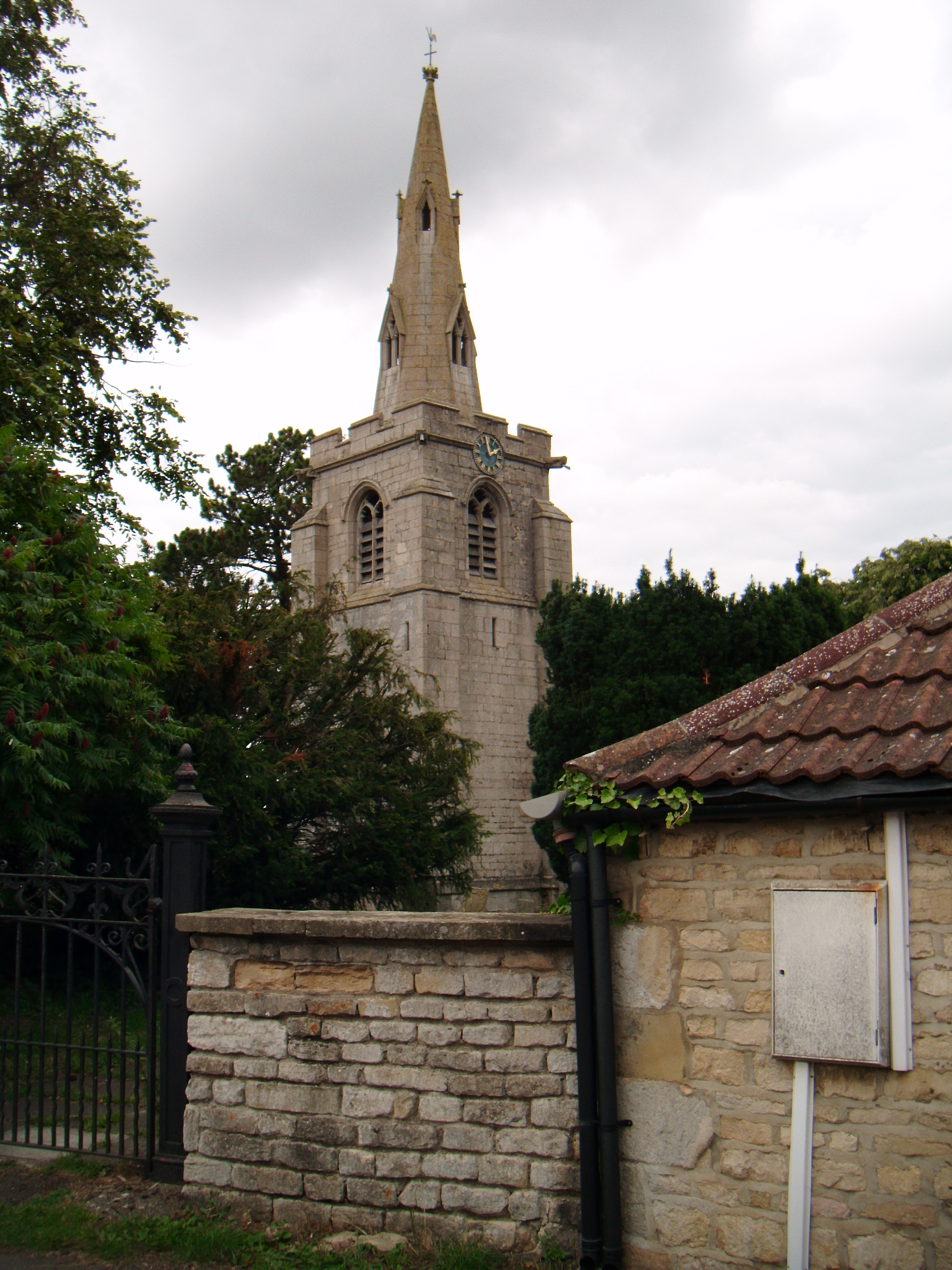
The Church of St Mary the Virgin viewed from the nearby road.

One of the eastformer facing windows in the church.
