= Humfrey Babington =

English Anglican divine

Humfrey Babington, D.D. (c. 1615 – 1691), was an English Anglican divine from Cossington, Leicestershire.

He was educated at Trinity College, Cambridge. He succeeded Robert Sanderson, on his appointment to the bishopric of Lincoln, as rector of Boothby Pagnell in Lincolnshire. He preached a sermon at the Lincoln assizes, which, at the request of his hearers, was published at Cambridge in 1678. It is a curious instance of the style of the time, being elaborately learned and crammed with quotations in Latin and Greek, and even Hebrew. Its political views may be estimated by its assertion that 'monarchy is the best safeguard to mankind, both against the great furious bulls of tyrannical popery, and the lesser giddy cattle of schismatical presbytery.' This sermon probably procured him the degree of Doctor of Divinity (DD) per literas regias in 1669. He afterwards became vice-master of Trinity College, built two sets of rooms for the use of the Babington family in the college, and founded the Barrow Hospital. His library was auctioned in Cambridge after his death, though he also left books to Trinity College, and to the town library at Leicester.
