= Twyford Wood =

- Twyford Forest
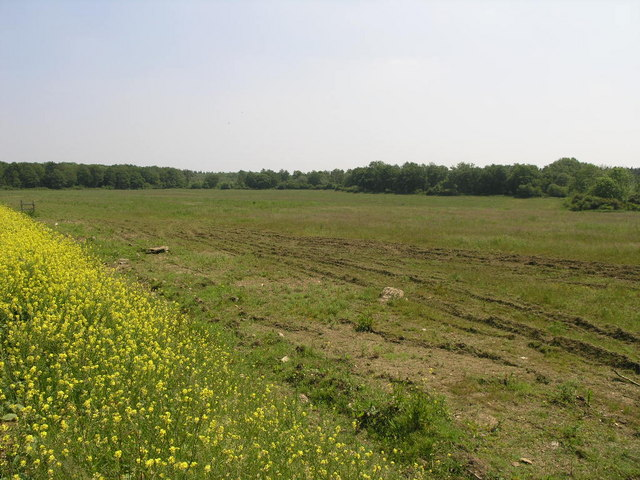

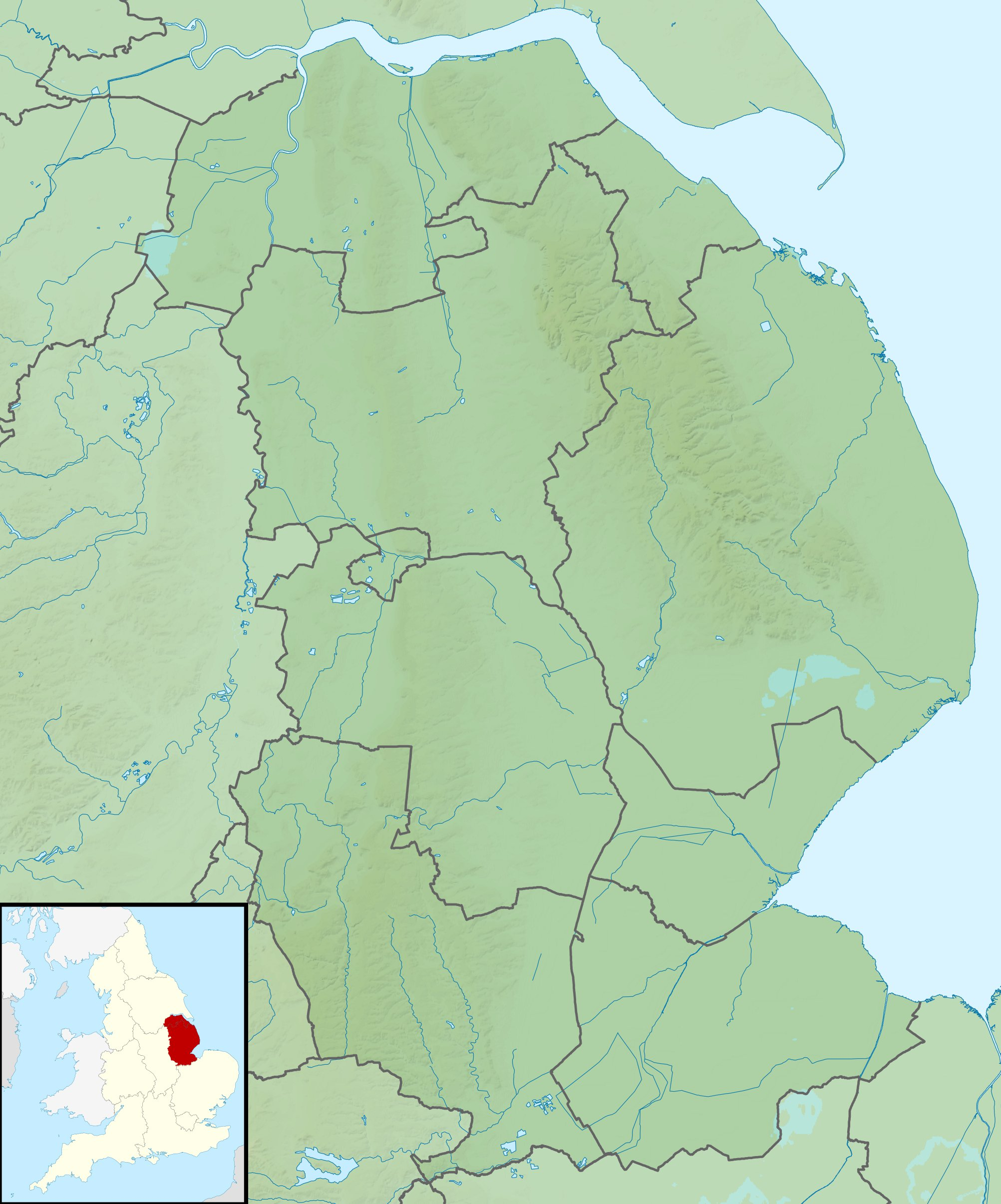
- Location within Lincolnshire
- Type: Commercial conifer plantation
- Location: Lincolnshire, England
- Coordinates: 52°47′46″N 0°35′44″W
- Area: 481 acres (195 ha)
- Elevation: 122 metres (400 ft)
- Created: 1950
- Operator: Forest Enterprise
- Plants: Green winged orchid

Twyford Wood, formerly known as Twyford Forest, is a commercial wood around grid reference SK948230 in Lincolnshire owned by the Forestry Commission, England, an agency of the British Government and managed by its subsidiary, Forest Enterprise (England).

== History ==
A woodland had existed before the Second World War, covering approximately 60 hectares (150 acres). During the war, much of the land beyond this was developed from 1943 onwards as RAF North Witham. This was used operationally by the United States USAAF. At the end of air hostilities in Europe, the USAAF handed the site back to the Royal Air Force, who used the site as a bomb-collection dump, from which ordnance was then dispatched for disposal.

At the end of hostilities of the Second World War, the woodland and RAF site were taken over by the Forestry Commission in 1945. In the 1950s, they redeveloped all of their woodlands holdings in the River Trent valley with Scots and Corsican pine for use by local industry, leaving the original Quercus robur oaks on the original woodland in place.

The name Twyford comes from the former medieval village of that name, south of Colsterworth, SK929229 Note: there is a similarly named surviving village at SK728103

== Present ==
Managed commercially today by Forest Enterprise (England), the 195 hectares (480 acres) commercial woodland lies one mile to the east of Colsterworth. To the south is Beaumont Wood.

== Soil and geology ==
The soil association is 712g Ragdale. Chalky till; slowly permeable seasonally waterlogged clayey and fine loamy over clayey soil. Boulder clay over upper Lincolnshire limestone.

== Nature conservation ==
The butterfly reserves are managed by the Lincolnshire branch of Butterfly Conservation. It is home to the dingy skipper and the grizzled skipper.

== Facilities ==
There is a small car park, with access from the A151. The wood is used for off-road motor sport.
