= RAF North Witham =

World War II airfield in Lincolnshire, England

RAF North Witham USAAF Station AAF-479
- North Witham, Lincolnshire, in England
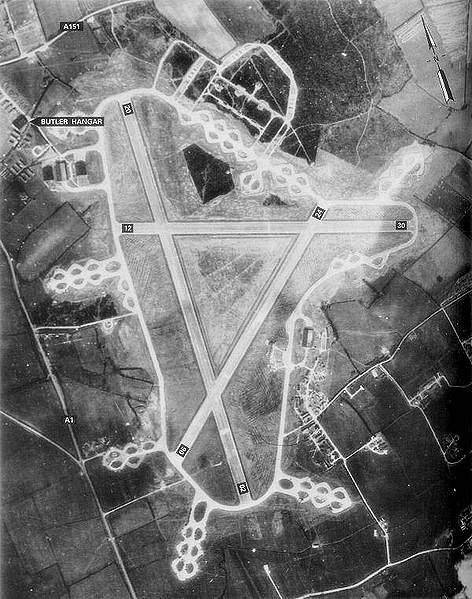
- North Witham airfield, 19 March 1944. Note the cluster of hangars in the technical site, to the northwest of the airfield, and the dispersed T-2 hangar, on the southeast side of the airfield.

Site information
- Type: Military airfield
- Code: NW
- Operator: Royal Air Force; United States Army Air Forces
- Controlled by: Ninth Air Force; RAF Maintenance Command

Location
- Shown within Lincolnshire
- Coordinates: 52°47′35″N 000°35′53″W

Site history
- Built: 1942
- In use: 1943-1956
- Battles/wars: European Theatre of World War II; Air Offensive, Europe July 1942 - May 1945

Garrison information
- Occupants: 1st Tactical Air Depot; IX Troop Carrier Pathfinder Group (Provisional)

Royal Air Force North Witham or more simply RAF North Witham is a former Royal Air Force station located in Twyford Wood, off the A1 between Stamford and Grantham, Lincolnshire, England about 104 miles (167 km) north-northwest of London.

The site opened in 1943 during the Second World War and used both the Royal Air Force and United States Army Air Forces, initially as transport airfield then for miscellaneous uses, before closing in 1956. Today the remains of the airfield are mostly woodland maintained by the Forestry Commission with the old concrete runways still accessible.

== History ==
=== USAAF use ===
North Witham was known as USAAF Station AAF-479 for security reasons by the USAAF during the war, and by which it was referred to instead of location. Its USAAF Station Code was "NW".

==== 1st Tactical Air Depot ====
North Witham was allocated to the USAAF Troop Carrier Command in August 1943. Its immediate task was to distribute transport aircraft and the means of maintaining them to operational groups of the USAAF. USAAF Douglas C-47 Skytrain maintenance repair activities continued at North Witham until May 1945, albeit on a reducing scale.

=== RAF Maintenance Command use ===
On 1 June 1945 the station was handed over to No. 40 Group, RAF Maintenance Command.

== Current use ==
The site was originally partially wooded and some of this remained to the northeast of the runways throughout the military period, but after closure the Forestry Commission planted most of the airfield with oak (Quercus robur) and conifers. Part of it is now a reserve for butterflies and the concrete is slowly being broken up and removed. Ghostly outlines of large numbers of loop dispersal hardstands can be seen in aerial photography, with the perimeter track being reduced to a single lane road. The runway pattern can clearly be seen, some still remaining at full width, other parts being now at half width or less. All of the remaining runway sections are in a very deteriorated condition.

However, the southern end of the airfield is now something of an industrial estate. In 1957 Conder Seeds Limited (a subsidiary of Twyford Seeds Limited, the Adderbury-based seed specialists) was located on the site and after the closure of Conder Seeds Limited in 1969, Humber Warehousing/Humber Mc Veigh occupied the Conder Seeds Site. The industrial estate has developed considerably with large numbers of grain silos, belonging to Openfield Agriculture Ltd, and highway trailers being parked. In addition, on the part of the site formerly occupied by Conder Seeds Limited/Humber Warehousing/Humber McVeigh there appears to be a very large graveyard of ex Ministry of Defence (MoD) equipment (now operated by Witham Specialist Vehicles Limited who dispose of surplus UK MoD equipment), where C-47s and Waco CG-4 Gliders once were parked prior to the invasion of Continental Europe.

The airfield's proximity to a junction of the A1 road means that development is pressing against the wood from the north-west. Nonetheless, the derelict control tower remains and on a warm summer's day, on the runway, in the quiet of the trees, it is a very atmospheric place.

== See also ==
- List of former Royal Air Force stations
- 82d Airborne Division

(US 508th Parachute Infantry Regiment) also flew from RAF Folkingham.

- 101st Airborne Division
