= Woolsthorpe-by-Colsterworth =

Hamlet in the South Kesteven district of Lincolnshire, England

Coordinates: 52.809863°N 0.628770°W

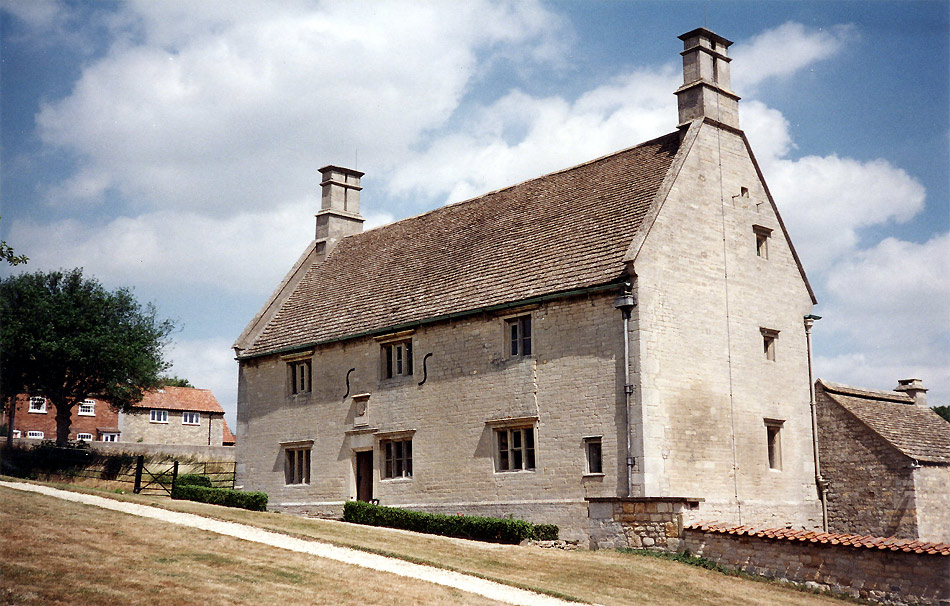
- Birthplace of Sir Isaac Newton

- Location within Lincolnshire
- OS grid reference: SK925244
  - London: 95 mi (153 km) SSE
- Civil parish: Colsterworth
- District: South Kesteven
- Shire county: Lincolnshire
- Region: East Midlands
- Country: England
- Sovereign state: United Kingdom
- Post town: Grantham
- Postcode district: NG33
- Police: Lincolnshire
- Fire: Lincolnshire
- Ambulance: East Midlands
- UK Parliament: Grantham and Stamford

Woolsthorpe-by-Colsterworth (to distinguish it from Woolsthorpe-by-Belvoir in the same county) is a hamlet in the South Kesteven district of Lincolnshire, England, within the civil parish of Colsterworth. It is best known as the birthplace of Sir Isaac Newton.

Woolsthorpe-by-Colsterworth is 1 mile (2 km) northwest of the village of Colsterworth on the A1 road. Woolsthorpe is 3 miles (4.8 km) from the county boundary with Leicestershire and 4 miles (6.4 km) from the county boundary with Rutland.

Woolsthorpe lies in rural surroundings. It sits on Lower Lincolnshire Limestone, below which are the Lower Estuarine Series and the Northampton sand of the Inferior Oolite Series of the Jurassic period. The Northampton Sand here is cemented by iron and in the 20th century the hamlet was almost surrounded by strip mining for iron ore. In 1973, the local quarries closed due to competition from imported iron ore. The same year the Great Northern Railway's High Dyke branch line closed – it was opened in 1916 to carry iron ore, and lay to the north of the village. There was an unsuccessful attempt to preserve the line.

Woolsthorpe Manor, Newton's birthplace, is a typical 17th-century yeoman farmer's limestone house, with later farmyard buildings. It is owned by the National Trust and is open to the public.
