= Diocese of Lincoln =

Diocese of the Church of England

Coordinates: 53.2343°N 0.5367°W

Diocese of Lincoln Dioecesis Lincolniensis
- Coat of arms

- Flag

Location
- Ecclesiastical province: Canterbury
- Archdeaconries: Lincoln, Stow and Lindsey, Boston

Statistics
- Parishes: 515
- Churches: 640

Information
- Cathedral: Lincoln Cathedral
- Language: English

Current leadership
- Bishop: Stephen Conway, Bishop of Lincoln
- Suffragans: Nicholas Chamberlain, Bishop of Grantham; Jean Burgess, Bishop of Grimsby
- Archdeacons: Gavin Kirk, Archdeacon of Lincoln; Aly Buxton, Archdeacon of Stow and Lindsey; Archdeacon of Boston (vacant)

Website
- www.lincoln.anglican.org

The Diocese of Lincoln forms part of the Province of Canterbury in England. The present diocese covers the ceremonial county of Lincolnshire.

== History ==
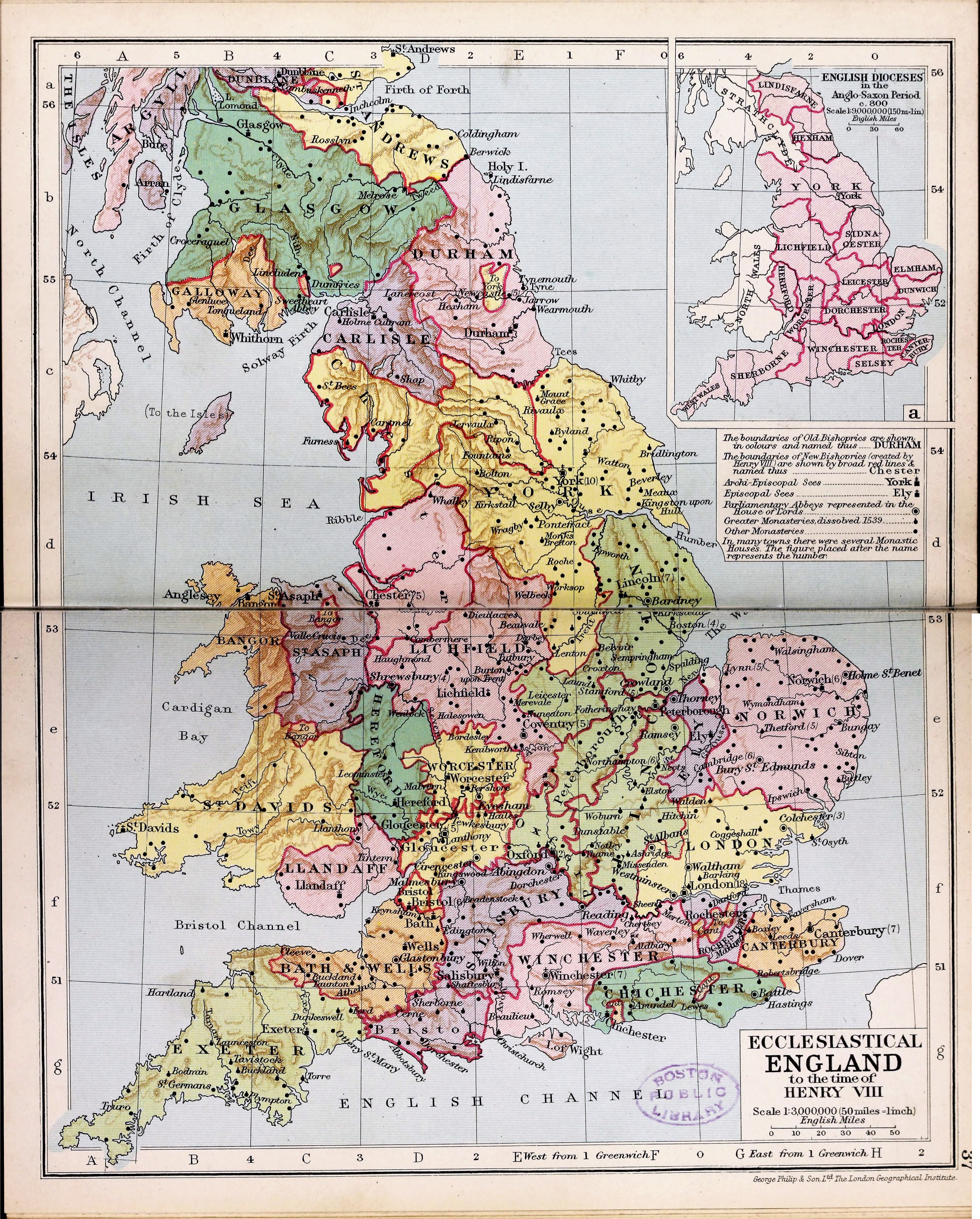
Dioceses of Henry VIII. Lincoln is the large green area, with Oxford and Peterborough marked subdivisions.

The diocese traces its roots in an unbroken line to the Pre-Reformation Diocese of Leicester, founded in 679. The see of Leicester was translated to Dorchester in the late 9th century, before taking in the territory of the Diocese of Lindsey and being translated to Lincoln. The diocese was then the largest in England, extending from the River Thames to the Humber Estuary. In 1072, Remigius de Fécamp, bishop under William the Conqueror, moved the see to Lincoln, although the Bishops of Lincoln retained significant landholdings within Oxfordshire. Because of this historic link, for a long time Banbury remained a peculiar of the Bishop of Lincoln. The modern diocese remains notoriously extensive, having been reportedly referred to by Bob Hardy, Bishop of Lincoln, as "2,000 square miles of bugger all" in 2002.

The dioceses of Oxford and Peterborough were created in 1541 out of parts of the diocese, which left the diocese with two disconnected fragments, north and south. In 1837 the southern part was transferred to other dioceses: Bedfordshire and Huntingdonshire to the Diocese of Ely, Hertfordshire to the Diocese of Rochester and Buckinghamshire to the Diocese of Oxford. Also in 1837, the county of Leicestershire was transferred from Lincoln to Peterborough (and became the independent Diocese of Leicester in 1927). The Archdeaconry of Nottingham was transferred to the Lincoln diocese at the same time.

In 1884, the Archdeaconry of Nottingham was detached to form a part of the new Diocese of Southwell.

== Organisation ==
=== Bishops ===
By virtue of the 2009 scheme of delegation, whilst the Bishop of Lincoln exercises general oversight, the Bishops of Grimsby and of Grantham were seen as leaders in mission in the north and south of the Diocese respectively until that scheme lapsed upon the 6 April 2013 retirement of the Bishop of Grimsby, which was followed by a review of roles of bishops in the diocese. The suffragan See of Grantham was created in 1905, and the See of Grimsby in 1935. It would seem that the decision to not fill the suffragan see of Grantham was taken at some point, but later reversed.

Alternative episcopal oversight (for parishes in the diocese which reject the ministry of priests who are women) is provided by the provincial episcopal visitor, Norman Banks, Bishop suffragan of Richborough, who is licensed as an honorary assistant bishop of the diocese in order to facilitate his work there. There are also four retired bishops living in the diocese who are licensed as honorary assistant bishops:

- 2019–present: Rob Gillion, interim Priest-in-Charge, St John the Baptist, Spalding and former Bishop of Riverina (New South Wales)
- 2001–present: David Tustin, former Bishop suffragan of Grimsby, lives in Wrawby.
- 2013–present: Another retired area Bishop of Grimsby, David Rossdale, lives in East Keal.
- 2013–present: Tim Ellis, retired area Bishop of Grantham, lives in Intake, Sheffield.

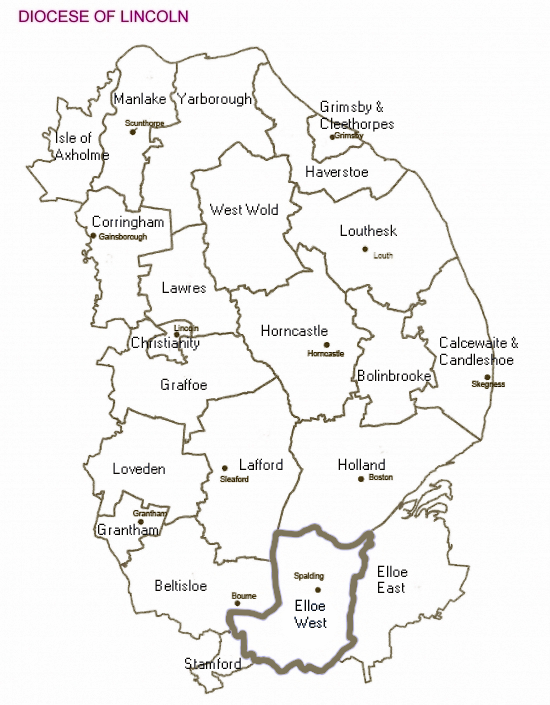
A map of the deaneries in the Diocese of Lincoln

=== Archdeaconries ===
The diocese is divided into three archdeaconries and 22 deaneries. On 22 April 2013, it was announced that a third archdeacon had been appointed pending a pastoral reorganisation. The changes to the archdeaconries enacted by the resulting pastoral scheme were announced on 15 November:

- Archdeaconry of Lincoln (established 11th century): Bolingbroke; Calcewaithe and Candleshoe; Christianity; Graffoe; Horncastle; Lafford; Louthesk
- Archdeaconry of Stow and Lindsey (established 11th century): Isle of Axholme; Corringham; Grimsby and Cleethorpes; Haverstoe; Lawres; Manlake; West Wold; Yarborough
- Archdeaconry of Boston (established 2013): (Aveland and Ness with) Stamford; Beltisloe; Elloe East; Elloe West; Grantham; Holland; Loveden

The diocese produces a bi-monthly newspaper, Crosslincs.

The archdeaconries have been:

- Middle Ages-1540s: Bedford, Buckingham, Huntingdon, Leicester, Lincoln, Northampton, Oxford, Stow
- 1540s–1830s: Bedford, Buckingham, Huntingdon, Leicester, Lincoln, Stow
- 1830s–1884: Lincoln, Nottingham, Stow
- 1884–1933: Lincoln, Stow
- 1933–1994: Lincoln, Lindsey, Stow
- 1994–2013: Lincoln, Stow&Lindsey
- 2013–: Boston, Lincoln, Stow&Lindsey

== Archdeaconry of Boston ==
=== Deanery of Beltisloe ===
==== Benefice of Beltisloe North ====
- St Andrew's, Boothby Pagnell
- St Bartholomew's, Ingoldsby
- St Peter's, Lenton
- St Mary Magdalene's, Old Somerby
- St Anne's Chapel, Great Humby
- St Peter's Church, Ropsley with Little Humby
- St Margaret's, Braceby
- St Nicholas', Sapperton

==== Benefice of Bourne ====
- SS Peter & Paul's, Bourne

==== Benefice of Bytham ====
- St Stephen's, Careby with Holywell and Aunby
- St Wilfrid's, Holywell
- St James's, Castle Bytham
- St Peter's, Creeton
- St Medardus', Little Bytham
- St Mary's, North Witham
- St John the Baptist's, South Witham

==== Benefice of Colsterworth ====
- St John the Baptist's, Colsterworth
- Holy Cross, Great Ponton
- St Nicholas', Gunby
- St Guthlac's, Little Ponton
- St Andrew and St Mary's Church, Stoke Rochford with Easton
- St James's, Skillington
- St Peter's, Stainby

==== Benefice of Corby Glen ====
- St Thomas Becket's, Bassingthorpe with Westby
- St Mary Magdalene's, Bitchfield
- St Thomas Becket's, Burton Coggles
- St John the Evangelist's Church, Corby Glen
- St Andrew's, Irnham
- St Nicholas', Swayfield

==== Benefice of Edenham with Witham-on-the-Hill and Swinstead ====
- St Michael's, Edenham
- St Mary's, Swinstead
- St Andrew's, Witham-on-the-Hill

==== Benefice of Ringstone in Aveland ====
- All Saints', Dunsby
- St Andrew's, Haconby
- St Mary & All Saints', Kirkby Underwood
- St John the Baptist's, Morton
- St Andrew's, Rippingale

=== Deanery of Elloe East ===
==== Benefice of Elloe Fen ====
- Gedney Hill: Holy Trinity
- Gedney Hill: St Polycarp
- Sutton St Edmund: St Edmund King and Martyr
- Sutton St James: St James the Greater
- Whaplode Drove: St John the Baptist

==== Benefice of Elloe Stone ====
- Holbeach Fen or Holbeach St John: St John
- Moulton: All Saints
- Moulton Chapel: St James
- Whaplode: St Mary

==== Benefice of Holbeach ====
- Holbeach: All Saints

==== Benefice of Long Sutton with Lutton and Gedney Drove End ====
- Gedney Dawsmere: Christ Church
- Long Sutton: St Mary
- Lutton: St Nicholas

==== Linked Benefices of Mid Elloe // Sutton Bridge and Tydd St Mary ====
- Fleet: St Mary Magdalene
- Gedney: St Mary Magdalene
- Holbeach Hurn: St Luke
- Holbeach Marsh: St Mark
- Sutton Bridge: St Matthew
- Tydd St Mary: St Mary

=== Deanery of Elloe West ===
==== Benefice of Cowbit ====
- Weston Hills: St John the Evangelist
- Aubourn: St Peter
- Cowbit: St Mary
- Weston: St Mary

==== Linked Benefices of Crowland // Deeping St James ====
- Crowland: SS Mary & Bartholomew & Guthlac
- Deeping St James: St James

==== Benefice of Deeping St Nicholas ====
- Deeping St Nicholas: St Nicholas (1846)

==== Benefice of Glen ====
- Pinchbeck: St Mary
- Surfleet: St Laurence
- West Pinchbeck: St Bartholomew

==== Benefice of Gosberton, Gosberton Clough and Quadring ====
- Gosberton Clough: SS Gilbert & Hugh
- Gosberton: SS Peter & Paul
- Quadring: St Margaret

==== Benefice of Market Deeping ====
- Market Deeping: St Guthlac

==== Benefice of Ness ====
- Baston: St John the Baptist
- Langtoft: St Michael
- Thurlby: St Firmin

==== Benefice of Spalding St John the Baptist ====
- Spalding: St John the Baptist (1875)

==== Benefice of Spalding SS Mary & Nicholas ====
- Spalding: SS Mary & Nicholas

==== Benefice of Spalding St Paul ====
- Spalding: St Paul (1880)

=== Deanery of Grantham ===
==== Benefice of Grantham St Anne ====
- Grantham: St Anne (1884, rebuilt 1911)

==== Benefice of Grantham St John the Evangelist Spitalgate with Earlesfield ====
- Grantham: St John the Evangelist (1841)

==== Linked Benefices of Grantham St Wulfram // Grantham Manthorpe ====
- Grantham: St Wulfram
- Manthorpe: St John the Evangelist (1848)

==== Benefice of Grantham Harrowby with Londonthorpe ====
- Harrowby: Ascension (1931, rebuilt 1956, 1960s)
- Londonthorpe: St John the Baptist

==== Benefice of Grantham West ====
- Barrowby: All Saints
- Denton: St Andrew
- Great Gonerby: St Sebastian
- Harlaxton: SS Mary & Peter
- Stroxton: All Saints
- Woolsthorpe: St James
- Wyville with Hungerton: St Catherine (rebuilt 1858)

=== Deanery of Holland ===
- Benefice of Boston
  - Boston: St Botolph
  - Boston: St Christopher (1930)
  - Skirbeck Quarter: St Thomas (1866, building 1885, rebuilt 1912)
- Benefice of Brothertoft
  - Brothertoft: St Gilbert of Sempringham
  - Holland Fen: All Saints (1812)
  - Kirton Holme: Christ Church
  - Langrick: St Margaret of Scotland (1828)
  - Thornton le Fen: St Peter
- Benefice of Fishtoft
  - Fishtoft: St Guthlac
- Linked Benefices of Frampton and Wyberton
  - Frampton: St Mary the Virgin
  - Frampton West End: St Michael & All Angels (1860)
  - Wyberton: St Leodegar
- Benefice of Freiston, Butterwick with Bennington, and Leverton
  - Butterwick: St Andrew
  - Freiston: St James
  - Leverton: St Helena
- Linked Benefices of Friskney // Old Leake with Wrangle
  - Friskney: All Saints
  - Old Leake: St Mary
  - Wrangle: SS Mary & Nicholas
- Benefice of Haven
  - Bicker: St Swithin
  - Donington: St Mary & the Holy Rood
  - Sutterton: St Mary
  - Swineshead: St Mary
  - Wigtoft: SS Peter & Paul
- Linked Benefices of Kirton in Holland with Algarkirk and Fosdyke // Skirbeck St Nicholas
  - Algarkirk: SS Peter & Paul
  - Fosdyke: All Saints
  - Kirton in Holland: SS Peter & Paul
  - Skirbeck: St Nicholas
- Benefice of Sibsey and Carrington
  - New Bolingbroke: St Peter
  - Carrington: St Paul
  - Frithville: St Peter
  - Sibsey: St Margaret
- Benefice of Skirbeck Holy Trinity
  - Skirbeck: Holy Trinity (1848)

=== Deanery of Loveden ===
- Linked Benefices of Brant Broughton and Beckingham // Leadenham // Welbourn
  - Beckingham: All Saints
  - Brant Broughton: St Helen
  - Stragglethorpe: St Michael & All Angels
  - Leadenham: St Swithin
  - Welbourn: St Chad
- Benefice of Saxonwell
  - Claypole North & South: St Peter
  - Dry Doddington: St James
  - Fenton: All Saints
  - Foston: St Peter
  - Long Bennington: St Swithin
  - Sedgebrook: St Lawrence
  - Stubton: St Martin
  - West Allington: Holy Trinity
  - Westborough: All Saints
- Benefice of East Loveden
  - Ancaster: St Martin
  - Heydour: St Michael and All Angels
  - Kelby: St Andrew
  - Rauceby: St Peter
  - Welby: St Bartholomew
  - Wilsford: St Mary
- Benefice of South Cliff Villages
  - Barkston: St Nicholas
  - Belton: SS Peter & Paul
  - Brandon: Chapel of St John the Evangelist
  - Carlton Scroop: St Nicholas
  - Caythorpe: St Vincent
  - Fulbeck: St Nicholas
  - Honington: St Wilfred
  - Hougham: All Saints
  - Hough-on-the-Hill: All Saints
  - Marston: St Mary
  - Syston: St Mary

=== Deanery of Stamford ===
- Benefice of Stamford All Saints with St John the Baptist
  - Stamford: All Saints
  - Stamford: St John the Baptist (redundant 2003)
  - Stamford: St Michael the Greater (rebuilt 1836, redundant 1974)
- Benefice of Stamford Christ Church
  - Stamford: Christ Church (1961, rebuilt c. 1980)
- Benefice of Stamford St George St Paul
  - Stamford: St George
  - Stamford: St Paul (closed 1548, became school chapel)
- Benefice of Stamford St Mary St Martin
  - Stamford Baron: St Martin (rebuilt 1485)
  - Stamford: St Mary
- Benefice of Uffington
  - Barholme: St Martin
  - Braceborough: St Margaret
  - Greatford: St Thomas of Canterbury
  - Tallington: St Lawrence
  - Uffington: St Michael
  - West Deeping: St Andrew
  - Wilsthorpe: St Faith

== Archdeaconry of Lincoln ==
=== Deanery of Bolingbroke ===
- Benefice of Bolingbroke
  - Ashby-by-Partney: St Helen
  - Aswardby: St Helen
  - Bolingbroke: SS Peter & Paul
  - Candlesby: St Benedict
  - Dalby: St Lawrence & Blessed Edward King
  - East Keal: St Helen
  - East Kirkby: St Nicholas
  - Eastville: St Paul
  - Firsby: St Andrew
  - Great Steeping: All Saints
  - Hagnaby: St Andrew
  - Hagworthingham: Holy Trinity
  - Halton Holgate: St Andrew
  - Hareby: SS Peter & Paul
  - Hundleby: St Mary
  - Langton-by-Partney: SS Peter & Paul
  - Little Steeping: St Andrew
  - Lusby: St Peter
  - Mavis Enderby: St Michael
  - Miningsby: St Andrew (redundant 1975)
  - Partney: St Nicholas
  - Raithby: Holy Trinity
  - Sausthorpe: St Andrew
  - Scremby: SS Peter & Paul
  - Skendleby: SS Peter & Paul
  - Spilsby: St James
  - Stickford: St Helen
  - Stickney: St Luke
  - Toynton All Saints: All Saints
  - Toynton St Peter: St Peter
  - West Keal: St Helen
- Benefice of South Ormsby
  - Bag Enderby: St Margaret
  - Brinkhill: St Philip
  - Harrington: St Mary
  - Haugh: St Leonard
  - South Ormsby: St Leonard
  - Ruckland: St Olave
  - Somersby: St Margaret
  - Tetford: St Mary

== See also ==
- Bishops of Lincoln
- Suffragan Bishop of Grimsby
- Lincoln Cathedral
- Prebendaries of Aylesbury – The prebend of Aylesbury was attached to the See of Lincoln as early as 1092.
