= St John the Evangelist's Church, Corby Glen =

St John the Evangelist Church, Corby Glen
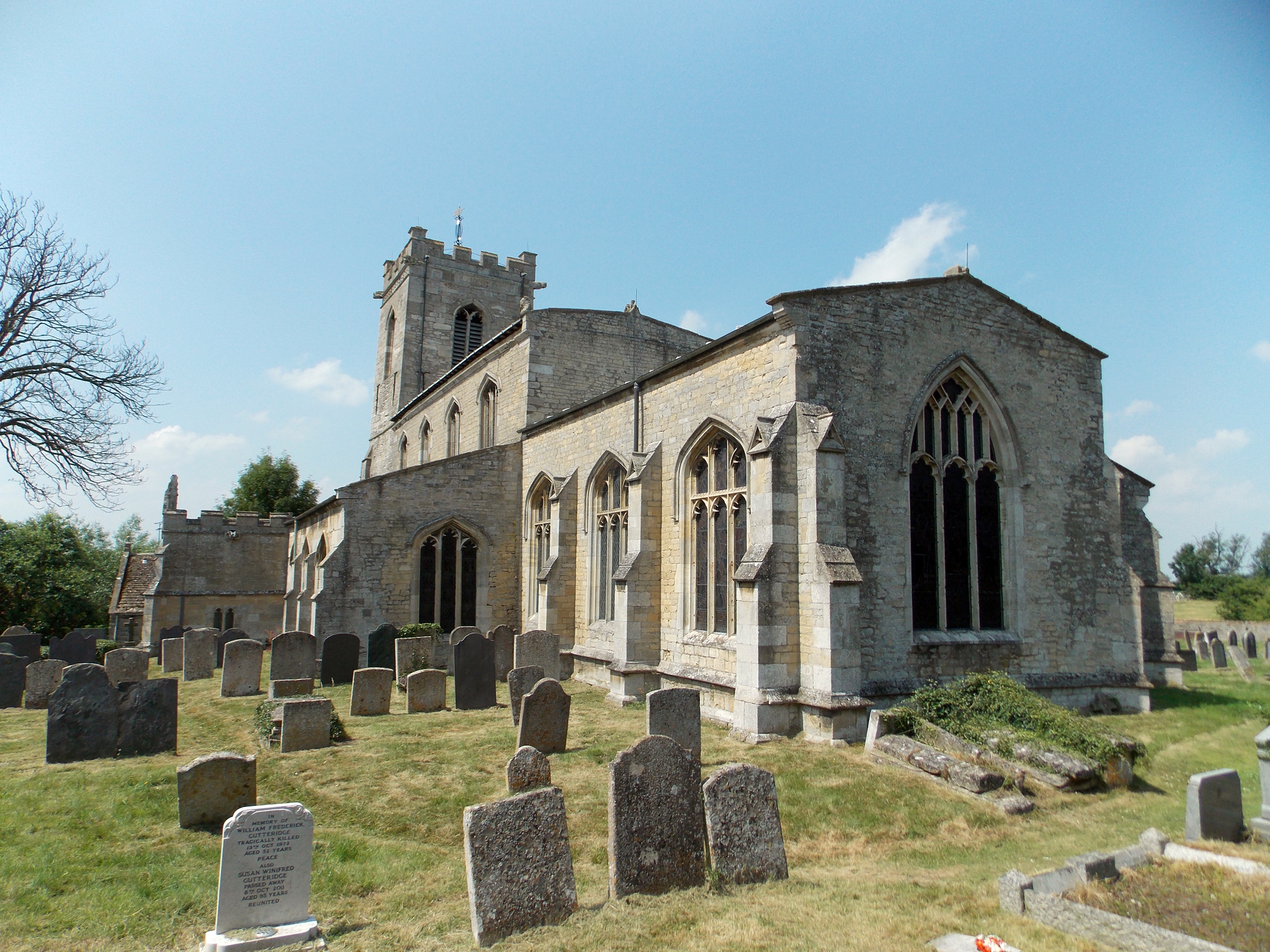
- Church of St John the Evangelist from the south-east
- St John the Evangelist Church, Corby Glen
- 52.8132°N 0.515708°W
- OS grid reference: TF 00136 25002
- Country: England
- Denomination: Church of England
- Website: https://corbyglen.church

History
- Founded: 12th century
- Dedication: John the Evangelist

Architecture
- Heritage designation: Grade I
- Designated: 1968
- Architectural type: Norman, Perpendicular, Decorated

Specifications
- Materials: limestone, rubble

Administration
- Province: Canterbury
- Diocese: Diocese of Lincoln
- Deanery: Deanery of Beltisloe
- Benefice: Corby Glen Group of Parishes
- Parish: Corby Glen

Clergy
- Rector: Revd Stephen Buckman (2023)

The Church of St John the Evangelist is a Grade I listed Church of England parish church dedicated to John the Evangelist, in Corby Glen, Lincolnshire, England. The church is 9 miles (14 km) south-east of Grantham, and in the South Kesteven Lincolnshire Vales. It is noted in particular for its 14th- and 15th-century medieval wall paintings.

St John's is in the ecclesiastical parish of Corby Glen, and is part of the Corby Glen Group of Parishes in the Deanery of Beltisloe, and the Diocese of Lincoln. Other churches within the group are St Andrew's at Irnham, St Nicholas' at Swayfield, St Thomas a Becket at Bassingthorpe, St Mary Magdalene at Bitchfield and St Thomas of Canterbury at Burton Coggles.

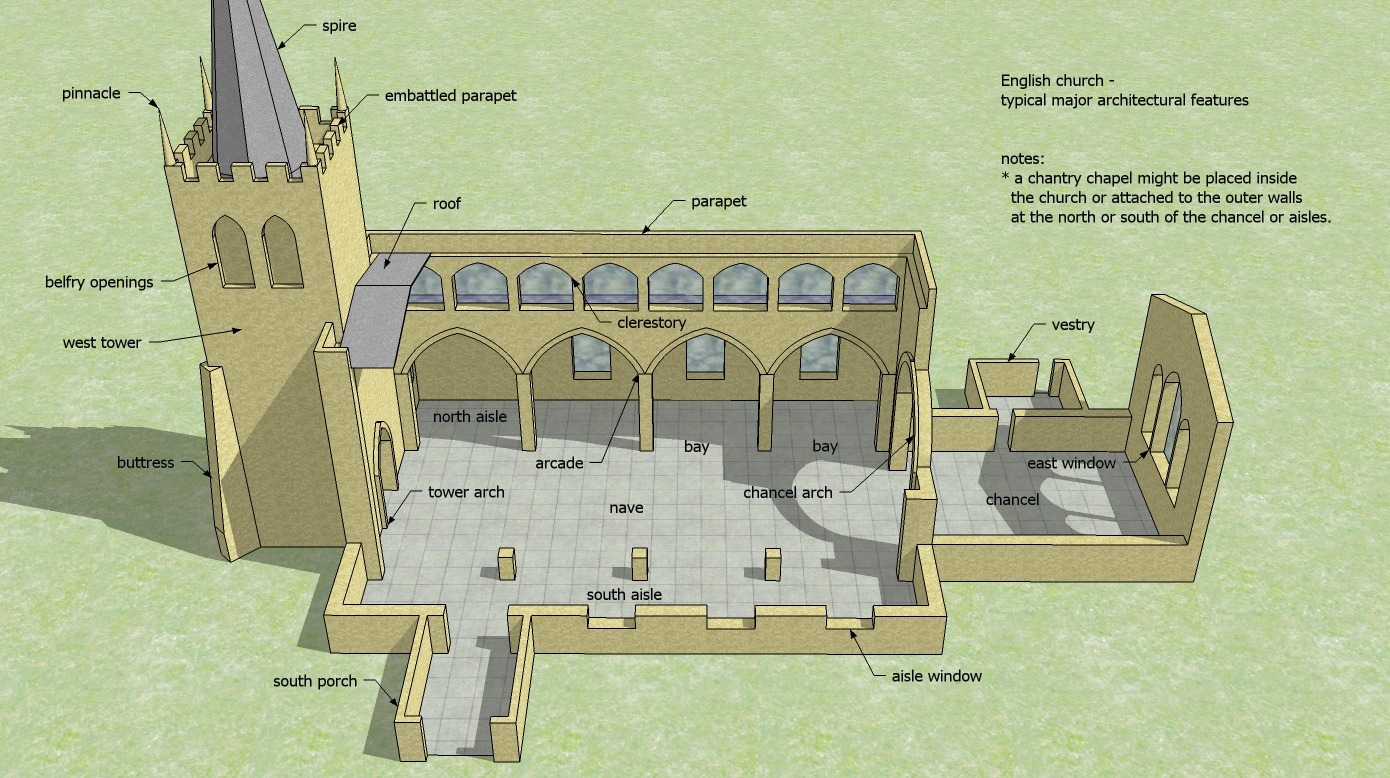
English churches – typical major architectural features

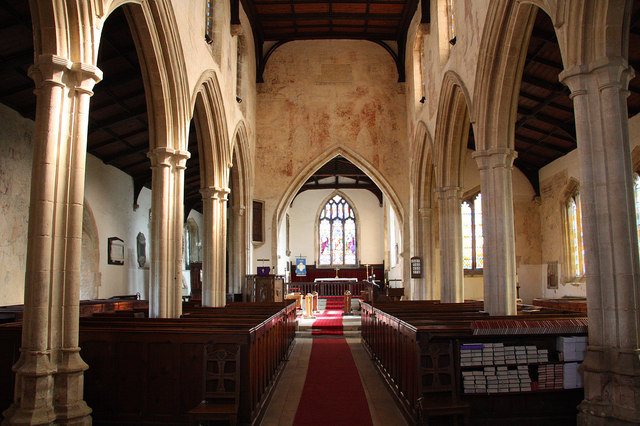
The nave, with the doom above the chancel arch

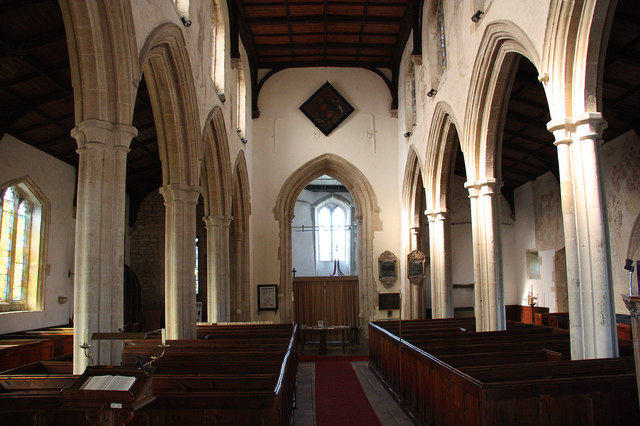
The nave, with figures above and on the west wall

== History ==
Neither a church nor priest was noted at Corby Glen at the time of the 1086 Domesday Book.

The church building dates from the 12th century. Side aisles were added during the 14th century, including a Lady Chapel in the north aisle before 1319. A porch and a short tower was built, and the chancel enlarged. The earliest wallpaintings (in the north aisle) date from this period.

The 15th century saw a massive rebuild. The nave roof was raised and a clerestory added to give more light. The chancel was extended in the 15th century, with two windows added; a further chapel was created at this point. The tower was made higher. The porch was replaced and a priest's room built above. Further wallpaintings were added.

The church was restored, and new pews added, in 1860, and the tower restored in 1928 at a cost of £800.

The church parish register dates from 1561. The earliest record of a Church of England rector at Corby was John Obyne, in 1551. In the 19th century the living of the incumbent (priest in charge) was a 'discharged vicarage'—freed from payment of financial returns, 'first fruits', obtained from ecclesiastical office—associated with the joint benefice of Corby and Irnham. The incumbent from 1851 until his death in 1899 was the Rev'd Charles Farebrother BCL, of Trinity College, Oxford, and former domestic chaplain to the 1st Duke of Cambridge, with a living of £700 net value, comprising a residency and 82 acres (0.3 km^{2}) of glebe lands in the gift of the trustees of W. H. Woodhouse of Irnham. Charles Farebrother placed a stained glass window in the chancel to the memory of his deceased children. By the 1930s the vicarage, and glebe lands which had reduced to 23 acres (0.1 km^{2}), in the gift of Sir Frederick John Jones JP, had been held since 1900 by the Rev'd Arthur Abbott MA, of Queen's College, Oxford.

In 1939 a churchwarden discovered medieval wall paintings beneath flaking later whitewash.

St John's received an English Heritage Grade I listing in 1968.

== Architecture ==
=== Exterior ===
St John's is of ashlar-faced limestone and rubble construction. It comprises a nave, chancel, north and south aisles, square tower, a south porch, and a chapel, and is of Norman, Perpendicular and Decorated styles.

The bell tower is embattled at its parapet and of three stages. The highest, the belfry stage, dating from the 15th century, contains louvred bell openings and is drained by gargoyles. At the base of the west buttress at the south side of tower is an inscription naming the mason Thomas de Somersby. The late 13th-century north aisle contains a single-chamfered pointed doorway at the west, and three windows, each with three lights, two of which were added during the 15th-century extension. The windows are traceried, with two incorporating quatrefoils. The nave Late Perpendicular clerestory windows are similar in style to those of the north aisle. The south aisle is Decorated, as is its south doorway, with its windows, one at the east and three at the south, 15th-century Late Perpendicular. The 14th-century south porch, too, is Perpendicular. It is two-storeyed and gabled, with a pointed-arch entrance opening, and surmounted by a parapet with pinnacles, and lit at its east and west sides by one small two-light window each. The upper level was a priest's room. Within the porch are stone benches, one on each side.

At the entrance to the churchyard, 20 yards (18 m) to the south-west of the church, are early 19th-century wrought iron gates with ashlar gate pillars; both are Grade II listed.

=== Interior ===
St John's accommodates seating for 206. The late 14th-century nave roof is braced by corbels of grotesque style. Its arcades are of four bays supported by piers faceted with four columns, set on polygonal bases, and surmounted by octagonal capitals, and arches. The arches are of Decorated style, and Pevsner suggests that they are part of an earlier build. He also points to the 13th-century chancel arch containing "most oddly, two plain Norman imposts", these too possibly previously placed elsewhere, a view supported by Cox. Above the arch are indications of the earlier chancel roof line, and on the chancel arch wall, above the pulpit on which is carved figure of John the Evangelist, is a small doorway to a former rood screen upper level loft. Within the chancel is a further arcade leading to the late Perpendicular north chapel. The Perpendicular west tower arch relates in style to the arcades and is edged with a quatrefoil frieze.

The 17th-century communion rail around the chancel altar was installed to prevent dogs from entering the sanctuary. An iron bound chest dating from the 15th century lies close to the south door. Stained glass windows, some of which are memorials, include two shields and a figure of St John dating from the 15th century, within a quatrefoil in the north aisle. Further medieval fragments are within other windows. Within the aisles are box pews, panelled, and dating from the 19th century. Within the chancel are two ledger slabs—slabs over graves—to hold brass plates, and in the chancel chapel a monument dedicated to Frances Wilcox, died 1764. Wall plaques by Hawley of Colsterworth are in the north aisle. The church font is 13th-century, octagonal, and sits on an 1893 marble shaft. Church plate includes a 1609 chalice.

==== Wall paintings ====
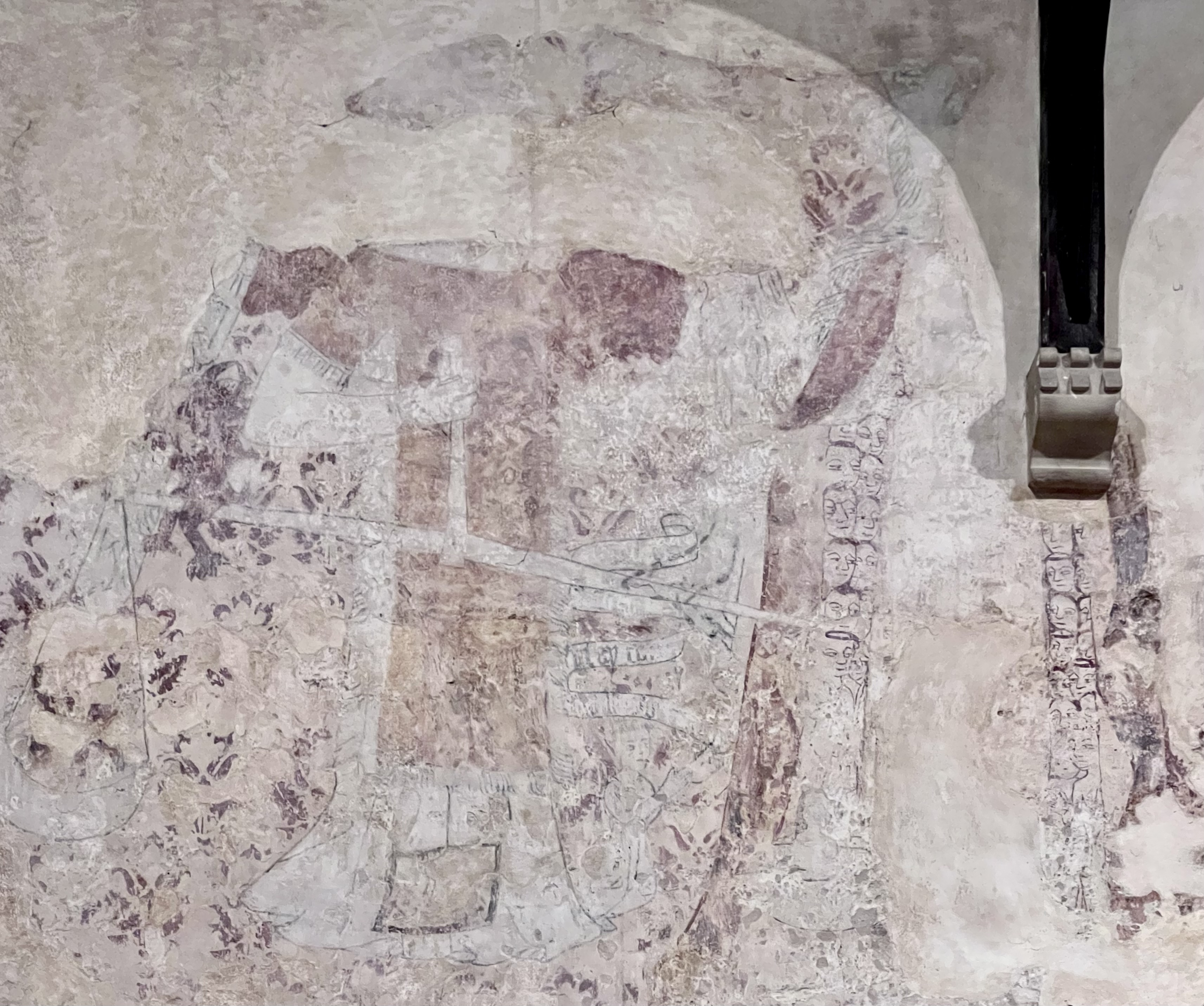
15th century wallpainting of St Michael weighing a soul and St Mary (Vierge de la Misericorde) interceding, west end of north aisle, St John's Church, Corby Glen

St John's medieval wall paintings from the 14th and 15th centuries provide the most notable aspect of the church. Pevsner describes these as "very extensive" and one, a "gigantic St Christopher, originally nearly 11ft high, c.1350" as "a delightful figure." There are Nativity scenes, including the Virgin, Child and Magi, and a shepherd and King Herod, in the clerestory. In the north aisle scenes include that of St Anne teaching the Virgin. Another image refers to the Seven Deadly Sins and a 'Warning to Swearers', in the centre of which is a Pietà, with "devils and elegantly dressed youths" (Pevsner). A unique survival in the UK is the 15th century painting in the north aisle of St Michael with the Virgin of Mercy interceding on behalf of the soul he is weighing. A Tree of Jesse within an ogee pattern is depicted on the south aisle wall.

== Bells ==
The church has a peal of six bells used for change ringing. Four of these were cast for the church between 1580 and 1628. Two others, obtained from St Albans, having been cast in 1935, were hung in 2013. During the re-hanging a bell that had been added to the peal in 1988 was removed for sale; this bell, the fifth at the time, had come from the St Thomas church at nearby Bassingthorpe.

In 1975 the original timber bellframe was replaced by a steel one. At that time the bell from the former grammar school was hung to provide a separate Sanctus bell to be rung for church services. This bell was cast in 1691 at the Stamford foundry of Tobias Norris.

== Organ ==
The church has a small single-manual organ with five stops, probably made by Taylor of Leicester. It was obtained from Stamford School in 1949 to replace an earlier organ installed in 1890. The Taylor organ was overhauled in 1997 by Aistrup & Hind.

== Gallery ==
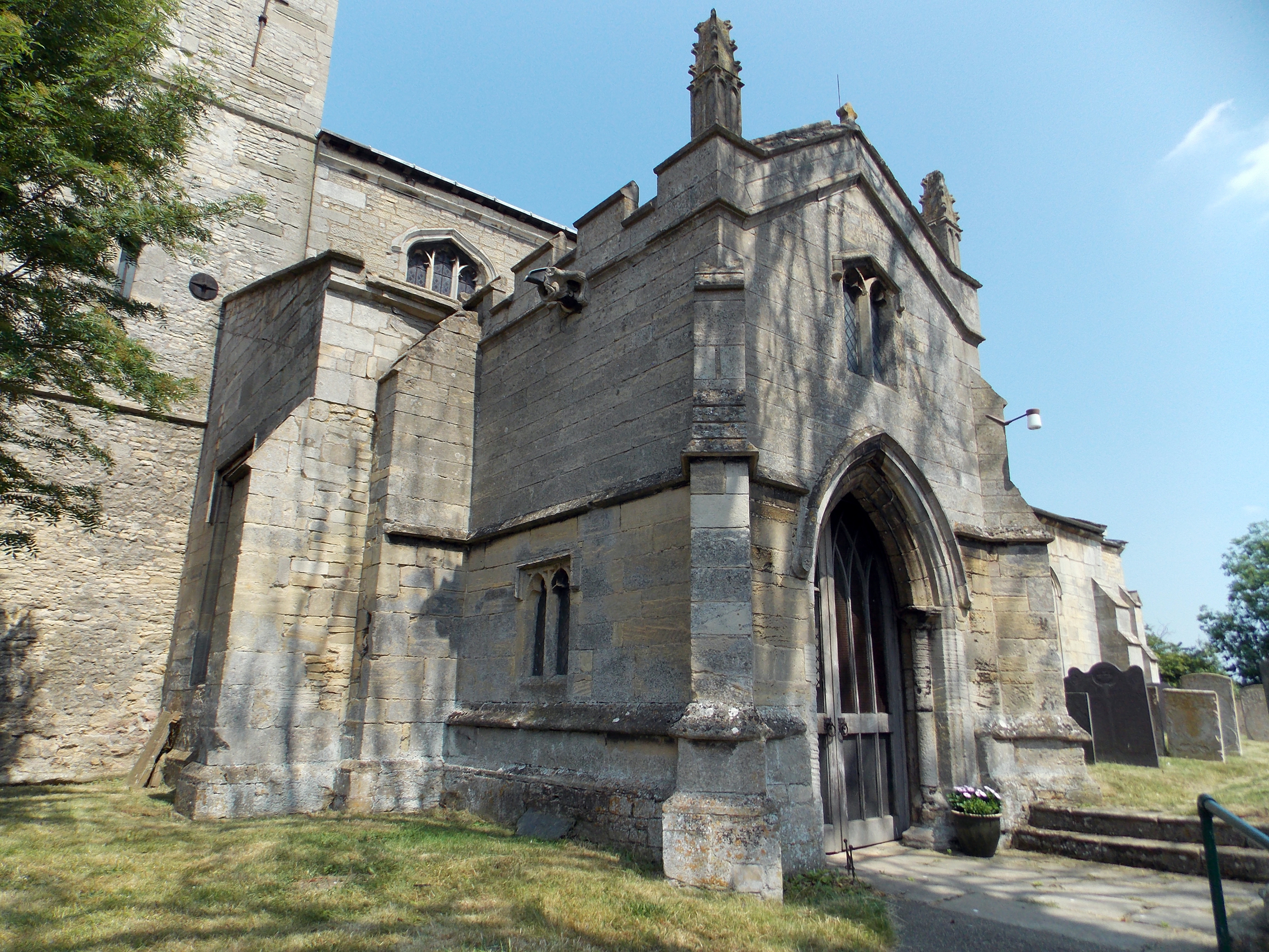
14th-century two-storey south porch, the upper floor a former priest room

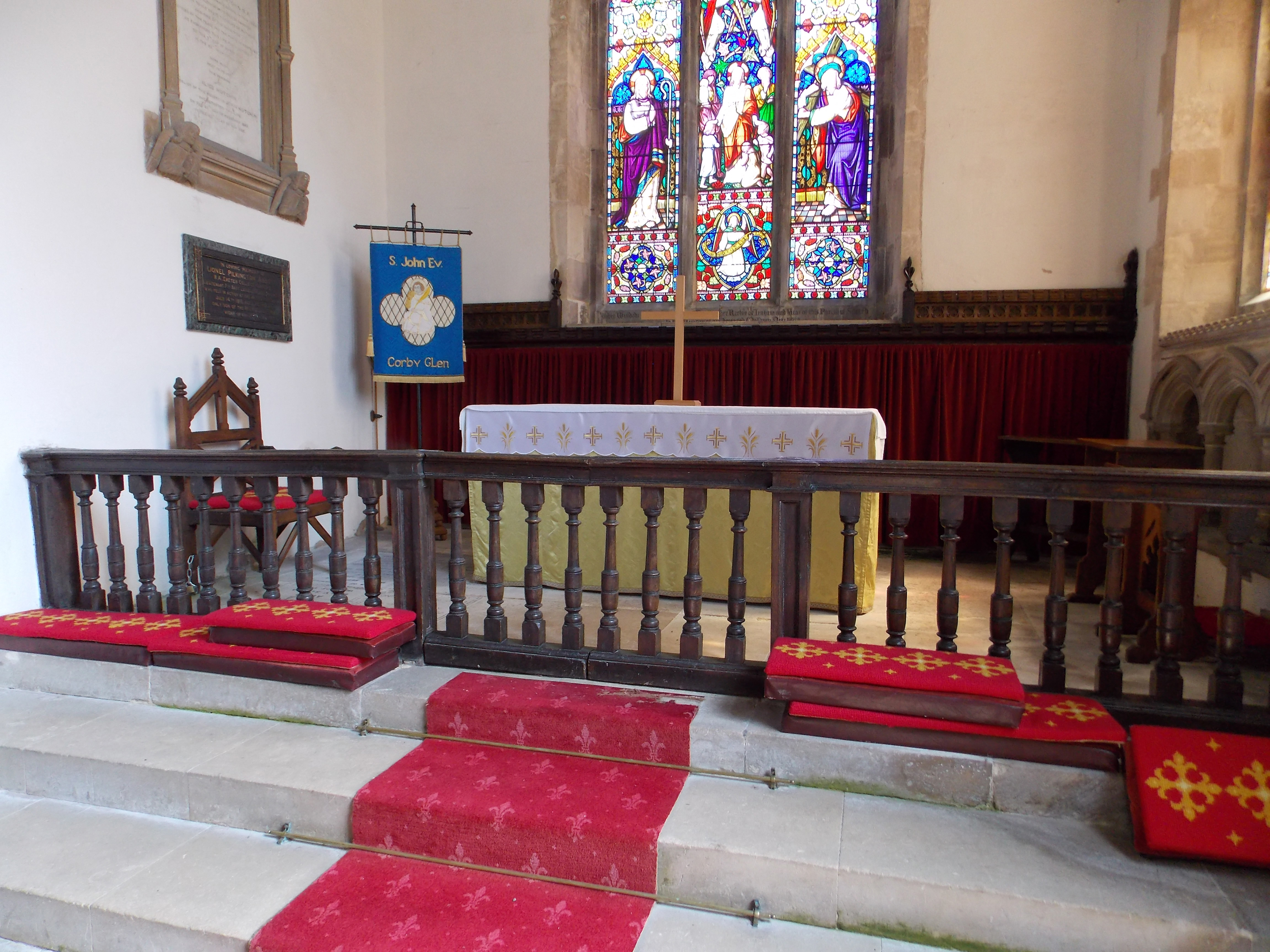
17th-century communion rail

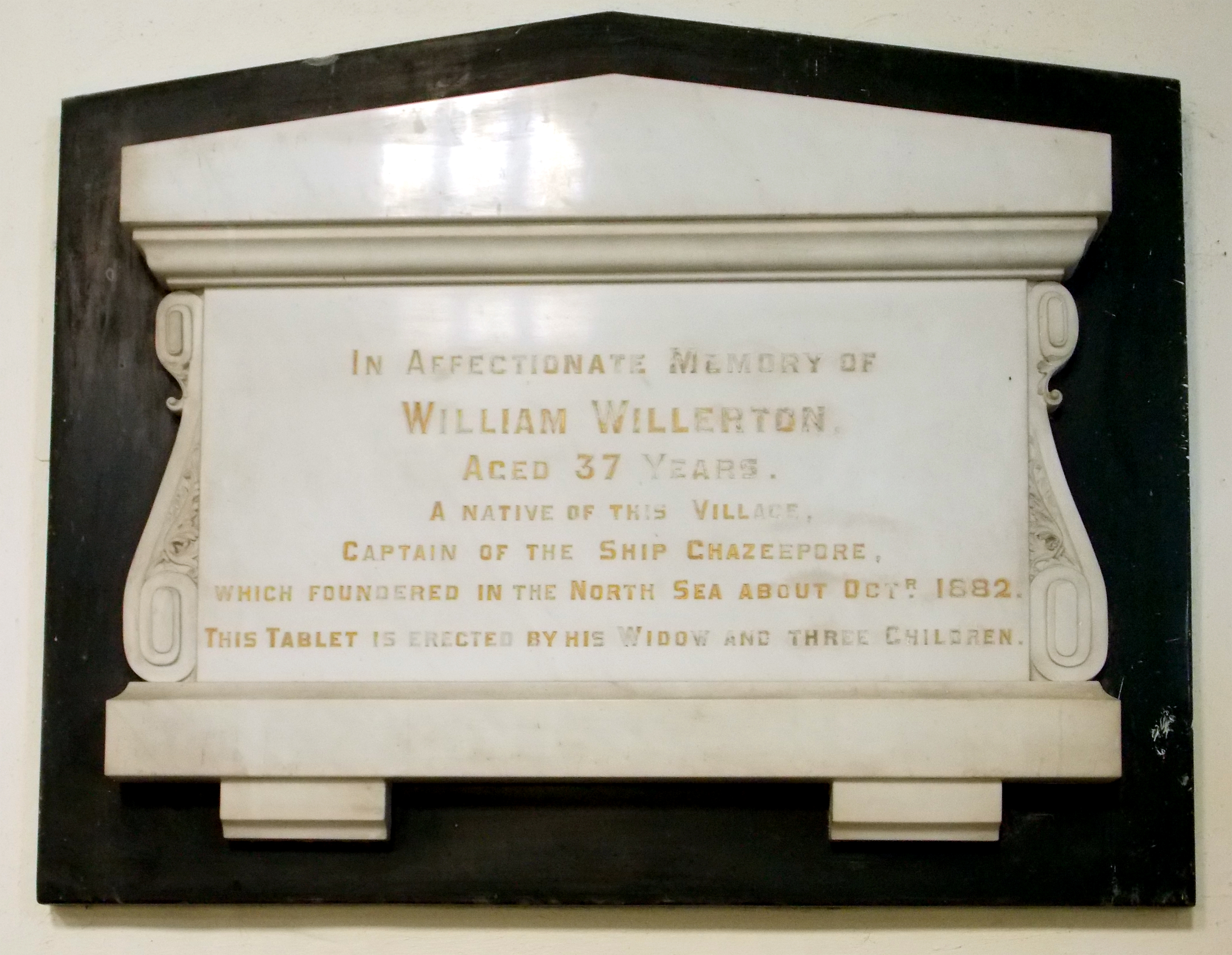
Memorial to William Willerton, captain of Chazeepore

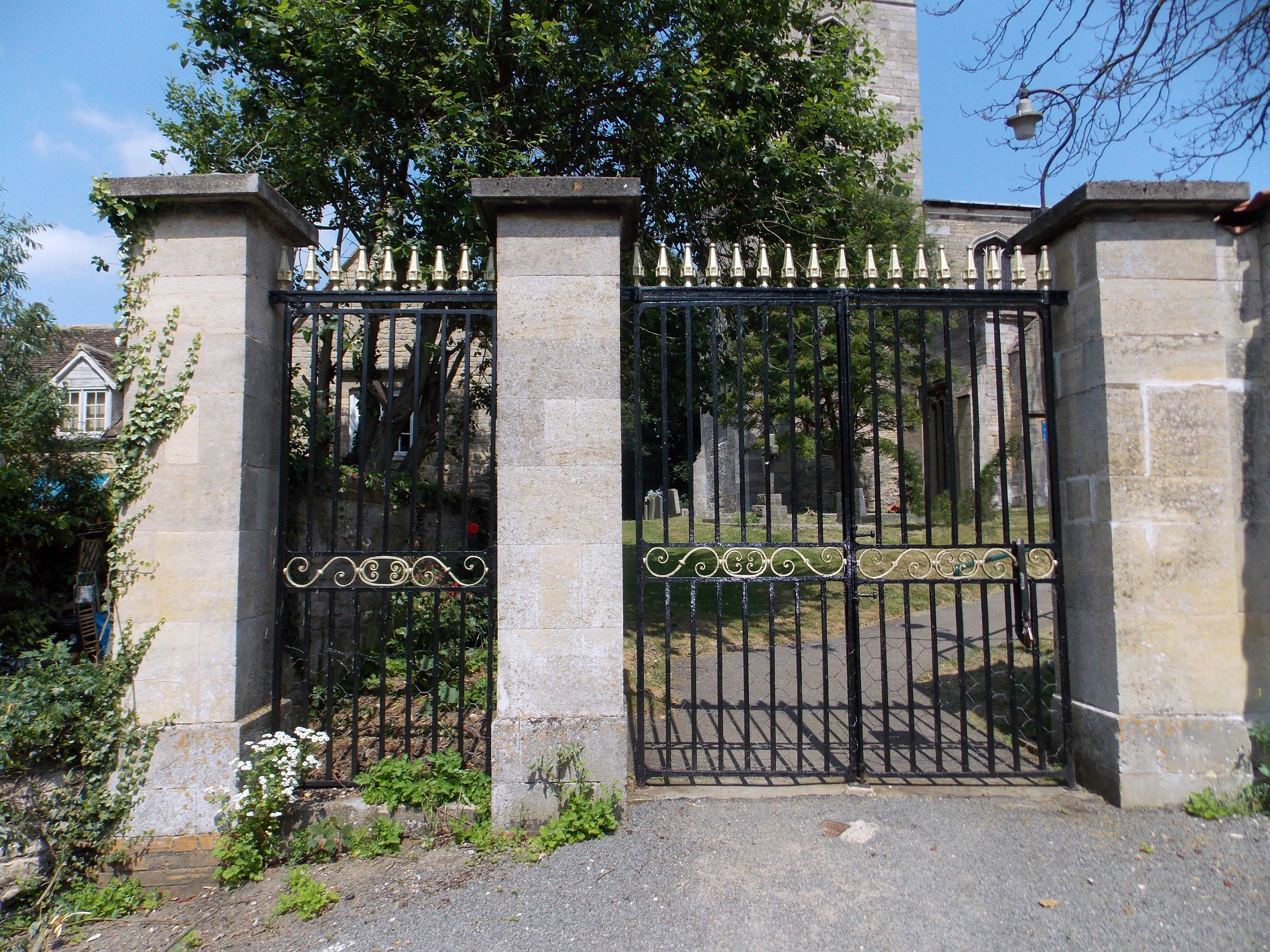
Listed church gates and gate pillars
