= Stoke Rochford =

Village south of Grantham, Lincolnshire, England

Coordinates: 52.835864°N 0.638942°W

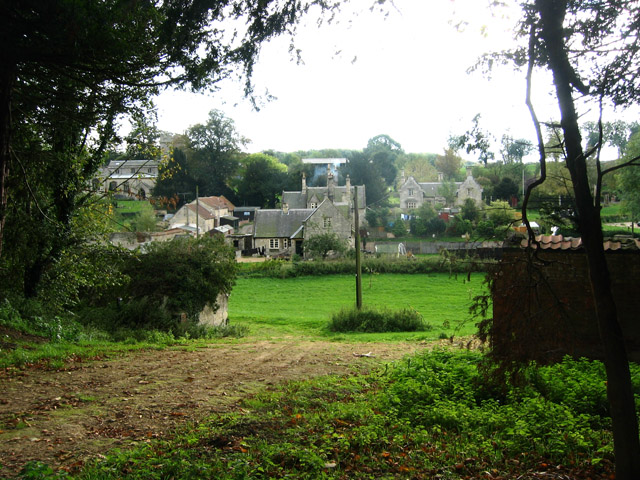
- Stoke Rochford

- Location within Lincolnshire
- Population: 230 (2011)
- OS grid reference: SK917273
  - London: 95 mi (153 km) S
- District: South Kesteven
- Shire county: Lincolnshire
- Region: East Midlands
- Country: England
- Sovereign state: United Kingdom
- Post town: Grantham
- Postcode district: NG33
- Police: Lincolnshire
- Fire: Lincolnshire
- Ambulance: East Midlands
- UK Parliament: Rutland and Stamford

Stoke Rochford is a small English village and civil parish 5.5 miles (9 km) south of Grantham in the South Kesteven district of Lincolnshire. The population at the time of the 2011 census was 230 (including Easton). It has two notable Grade I listed buildings: Stoke Rochford Hall and the doubly dedicated St Mary and St Andrew's Church.

== History ==
Stoke Rochford church was originally dedicated to St Mary. The village was originally called South Stoke until the expansion of the park in 1843, when North Stoke was removed. The village was laid out in 1843 to complement the architectural scheme of the new hall, built for Christopher Turnor by William Burn.

The dedication of North Stoke church to St Andrew was transferred, so that the church in Stoke Rochford has a double dedication. North and South Stoke belonged to the historical wapentake of Winnibriggs and Threo.

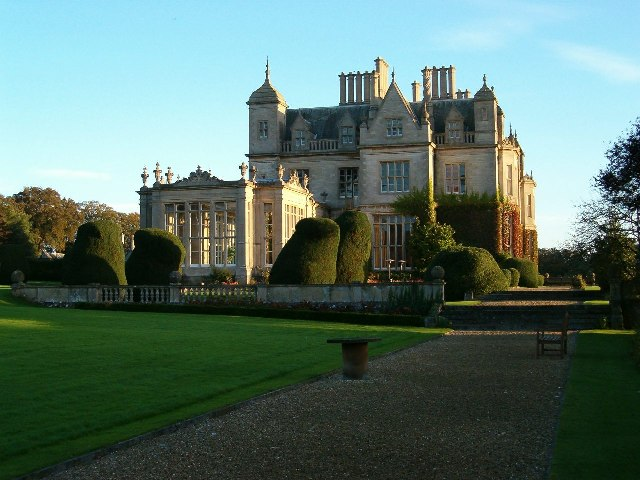
Stoke Rochford Hall

=== Hall ===
Stoke Rochford Hall, designed by William Burn and built in 1845, was gutted by fire on 25 January 2005. It was formally the NUT's national training centre, as well as a hotel and a venue for conferences and wedding receptions which continues to this day.

On 28 April 1945 a Canadian (RCAF) Avro Lancaster crashed in the grounds of the hall.

In December 2009 the hall was named the Les Routiers Best Country Retreat in the UK.

=== Lost villages ===
The deserted medieval village of Ganthorpe, mentioned in the Domesday Book, is now known only as a field name in the park: Ganthrops.

North Stoke (Nortstoches) is mentioned in the Domesday survey as a possession of Earl Morcar, claimed by the Norman baron, Drew de Beurere. It survived until the 19th century, when it was cleared for the creation of the current park. The remains of a Saxon cross from the old church, discovered after its demolition, are in Stoke Rochford Church.

== Geography ==
For administrative purposes the parish is combined with Easton, which also has a country estate. Stoke Rochford's church is in the parish of Easton, as is the post office.

The southern boundary of the parish follows the road, east–west, that crosses the A1. The parish extends westwards to the Leicestershire boundary and the north edge of Saltby Airfield near the Viking Way. It follows the Lincolnshire boundary northwards for about 440 yards (402.3 m). North of the parish is Wyville cum Hungerton. The parish extends about 1 mile (1.6 km) north of the village to North Lodge Plantation, where there is a bend westwards in the A1 as it approaches Great Ponton, which is the parish north of Stoke Rochford. The parish extends east to the point where Ermine Street meets the East Coast Main Line. The bridge is just inside Great Ponton parish. Just under a mile of the line is in the parish, including the Stoke Tunnel. Just to the east is Stoke Tunnel Farm, which is in Bitchfield and Bassingthorpe. Just south of Stoke Tunnel is Highdyke Farm. South of here is the large Stoke Park Wood, and the eastern boundary here follows the railway line until it meets Easton parish, just south of Old Park Wood. Here it also borders with Burton Coggles, just north of Sleight's Wood.

The Cringle Brook flows northwards from the village, and on the opposite side of the A1 is the River Witham.

=== Transport ===
21 year old Johnny Rogers (born 1941) of Cheshunt, the bass player of The Roulettes, was killed in the early hours of Monday 27 May 1963, travelling to Sunderland, when their Bedford Dormobile hit a stationary lorry on the northbound carriageway of the dual carriageway. The driver was 21 year old Peter Cotter of Stratford-upon-Avon. Their previous show had taken place on Monday, at the Empire Theatre. The lorry was having its wheel changed, with driver Joseph Lovejoy of London.

The road bridge was dismantled on 26 June 1988. Two restaurants were built from June 1988, costing £450,000.

== Community ==
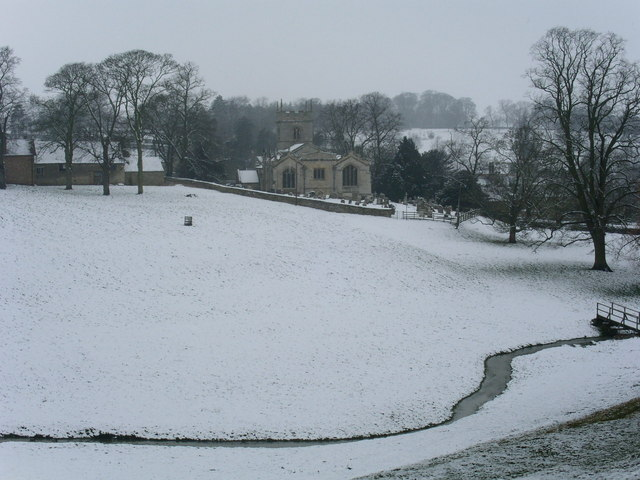
The Church of St Mary and St Andrew

Stoke Rochford is part of the grouped parish council of Stoke Rochford and Easton.

The ecclesiastical parish has same name, and is part of the Colsterworth Group in the Deanery of Beltisloe, Diocese of Lincoln. The former incumbent was the Rev. E. J. Lomax and a new appointment is expected in due course. The parish church, dedicated to Saint Andrew and Saint Mary, also serves as the parish church for Easton.

The village has a post office and a golf club. Adjacent to the latter on the A1 is a filling station and cafeteria.

== Notable people ==
Notable current residents of Stoke Rochford are Geoff Capes and Lady Sarah McCorquodale.

Stoke Rochford was the birthplace of Fanny Margaret Taylor, who as Magdalen Taylor founded the Poor Servants of the Mother of God, a Catholic order of nuns, in 1872.

== See also ==
- Stoke Rochford Hall
- Easton
- Harlaxton Manor
