= Boothby Pagnell =

Village in South Kesteven district of Lincolnshire, England

Coordinates: 52.866770°N 0.558159°W

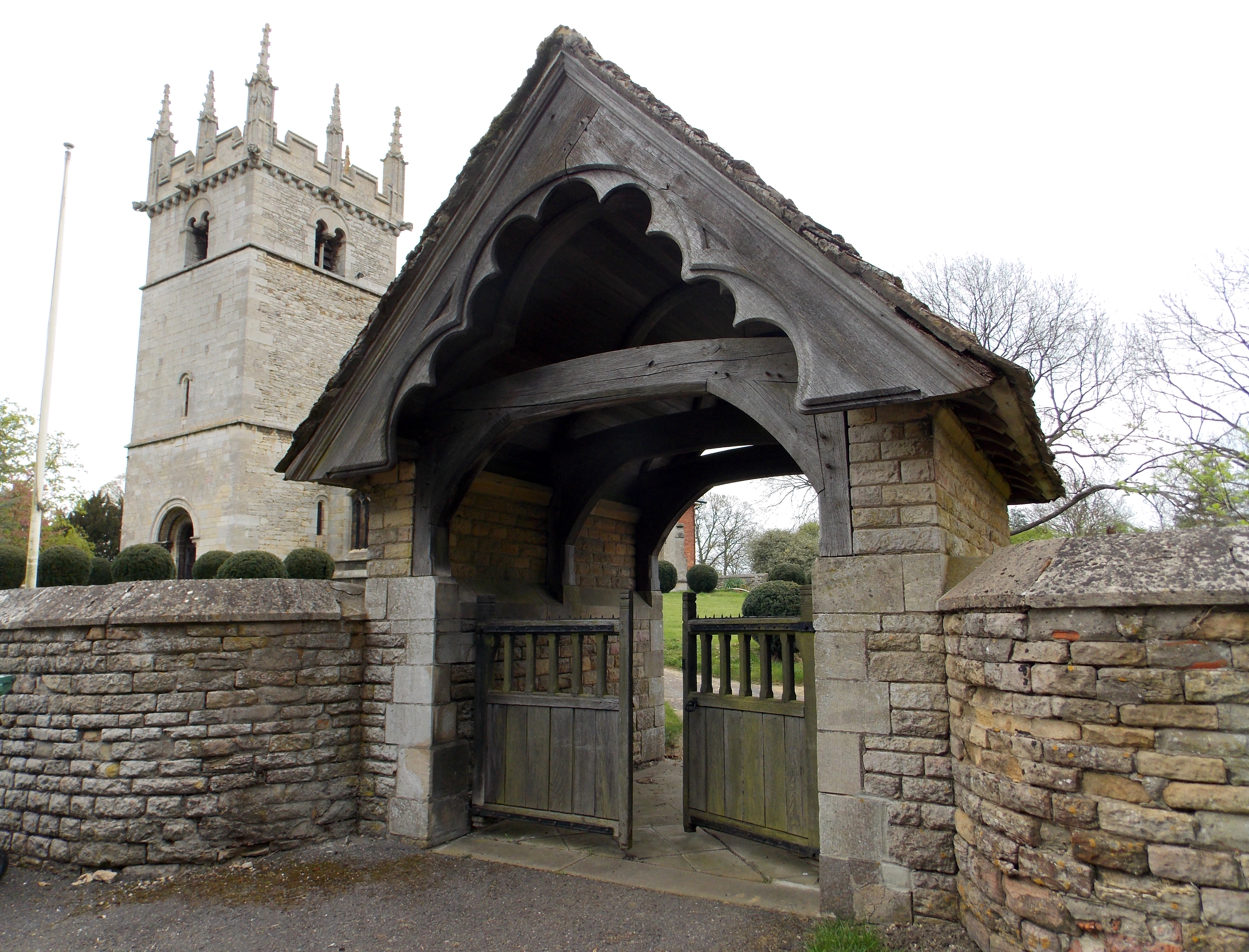
- Lychgate of St Andrew's Church

- Location within Lincolnshire
- OS grid reference: SK971308
  - London: 90 mi (140 km) S
- District: South Kesteven
- Shire county: Lincolnshire
- Region: East Midlands
- Country: England
- Sovereign state: United Kingdom
- Post town: Grantham
- Postcode district: NG33
- Police: Lincolnshire
- Fire: Lincolnshire
- Ambulance: East Midlands
- UK Parliament: Grantham and Bourne

Boothby Pagnell ' is a village and civil parish in the South Kesteven district of Lincolnshire, England. The population is now included in the civil parish of Bitchfield and Bassingthorpe.

== History ==
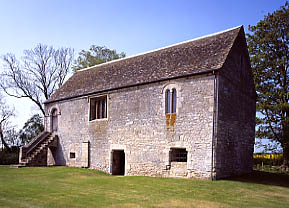
The Norman manor house

The village lay in the historical wapentake of Winnibriggs and Threo.

Boothby Pagnell has a Grade I listed surviving fragment of a medieval manor house, in the Norman style, dating from around 1200 AD.

The village was a small community, its population in 1086 being just 19. It has archaeological remains at Cooks Close, a field west of the church, which is chiefly of medieval housing that seems to have fallen into disuse and dereliction by the 14th century, possibly as a result of the fall in the workforce in the aftermath of the Black Death.

John de Bothby, Lord Chancellor of Ireland, was born here about 1320 and took his name from the village.

=== Isaac Newton ===
Although his uncle William Ayscough, the brother of Hannah Ayscough, was vicar of nearby Burton Coggles, during his period of scientific discoveries in 1666–1667, Isaac Newton spent some time in the summer at the rectory of Boothby Pagnell, which had a considerable orchard. The vicar was the Trinity College Fellow Humphrey Babington, the brother of Katherine Babington. She was a friend of Hannah Ayscough and the wife of William Clark, the owner of the house at which Newton lodged in Grantham while at school.

In his memoirs, Newton noted that he worked on Fluxions (which became differential calculus) at Babington's rectory and also calculated the area under a hyperbola (involving integral calculus).

== Geography ==
The village is just north of Bitchfield and south of Old Somerby on the B1176 and approximately 5 miles (8 km) south-east from Grantham. According to the 2001 Census it had a population of 150. Boothby Pagnell forms the most western point of 'The Ropsley Triangle', which denotes the general area between Ropsley, Boothby Pagnell and Ingoldsby.

== Ecclesiastical parish ==
The local authority, and the Ordnance Survey, spell the village "Boothby Pagnell". The Diocese of Lincoln spells the PCC as "Boothby Pagnall".

The ecclesiastical parish is part of the North Beltisloe group in the Deanery of Beltisloe. From 2006 to 2011 the incumbent was Rev. Richard Ireson.

Boothby Pagnell Grade I listed Anglican parish church is dedicated to St Andrew Restored in 1896, it has a Norman tower, font and nave arcades. It also has a canonical sundial on the south wall.

== See also ==
- History of calculus
