= Boothby, Lincolnshire =

Boothby, Lincolnshire may refer to:

- Boothby Graffoe, Lincolnshire, England
- Boothby Pagnell, Lincolnshire, England
