= Ingoldsby, Lincolnshire =

Village in Lincolnshire, England

Coordinates: 52.858715°N 0.50167°W

Ingoldsby
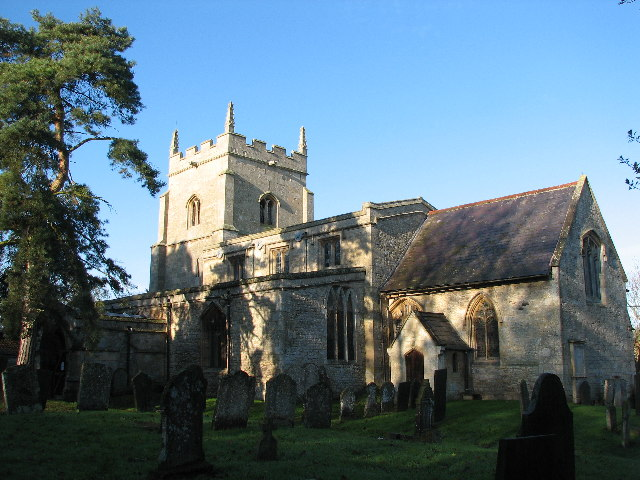
- St Bartholomew's Church, Ingoldsby

- Location within Lincolnshire
- Population: 254 (2001)
- OS grid reference: TF009300
  - London: 90 mi (140 km) S
- District: South Kesteven
- Shire county: Lincolnshire
- Region: East Midlands
- Country: England
- Sovereign state: United Kingdom
- Post town: Grantham
- Postcode district: NG33
- Police: Lincolnshire
- Fire: Lincolnshire
- Ambulance: East Midlands
- UK Parliament: Grantham and Stamford

Ingoldsby is a small village in the South Kesteven district of Lincolnshire, England. It is situated 7 miles (11 km) south-east from the market town of Grantham, 32 miles (51 km) south of the county town of Lincoln, and 33 miles (53 km) east of the City of Nottingham. The village contains approximately 121 households.

Ingoldsby is a civil parish and an ecclesiastical parish. The ecclesiastical parish is part of The North Beltisloe Group of parishes in the Deanery of Beltisloe. From 2006 to 2011 the incumbent was Rev Richard Ireson. The parish church is dedicated to St Bartholomew.

Ingoldsby is situated midway between Grantham and Bourne. Adjacent villages include Great Humby, Lenton, Bitchfield and Boothby Pagnell. The population of the parish is 254. Close by to the east of the village is the Roman road King Street that ran from Bourne to near Ancaster.

Adjacent to the village is the minor hamlet of Scotland, and Scotland House. They are connected by Scotland Lane.

Ingoldsby forms the most southerly point of the Ropsley Triangle, which denotes the area between Ropsley, Boothby Pagnell and Ingoldsby.
