= Great Ponton railway station =

Former railway station in Lincolnshire, England

Coordinates: 52.8623°N 0.6154°W

Great Ponton
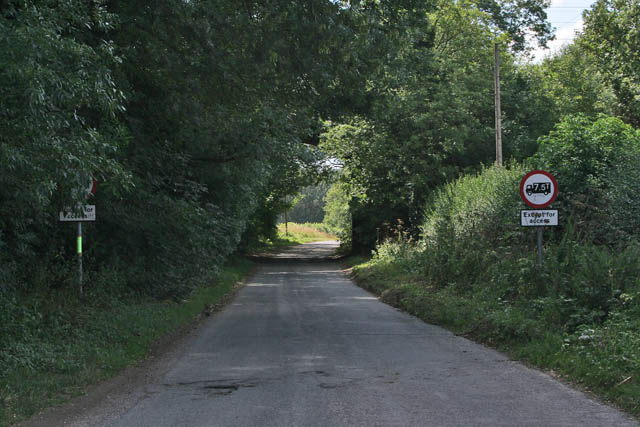
- View through the railway bridge towards the site of the old Great Ponton station

General information
- Location: Corby Glen, Lincolnshire; England
- Grid reference: SK933304
- Platforms: 2

Other information
- Status: Disused

History
- Pre-grouping: Great Northern Railway
- Post-grouping: London and North Eastern Railway; Eastern Region of British Railways

Key dates
- 2 October 1853: Opened
- 15 September 1958: Closed for passengers
- 29 April 1963: Closed for freight
Location

Great Ponton railway station was a station on the East Coast Main Line at Great Ponton, Lincolnshire, England. The Great Northern Railway opened it in 1853 and British Railways closed it in 1958. The station buildings were demolished soon after the closure.

== Quarry link ==
The Park Gate Iron and Steel Company had an ironstone quarry east of Sproxton, Leicestershire. A 6-mile (10 km) mineral railway linked it with the East Coast Main Line at a junction just under 1 mile (1.6 km) south of Great Ponton station. A 1917 Manning Wardle steam locomotive that worked the line is preserved on the Kent and East Sussex Railway.

Preceding station	Historical railways	Following station
Corby Glen; Line open, station closed	Great Northern Railway	Grantham; Line and station open
