= Leverton, Lincolnshire =

Village and civil parish in the Boston district of Lincolnshire, England,

Coordinates: 53.006242°N 0.083942°E

Leverton
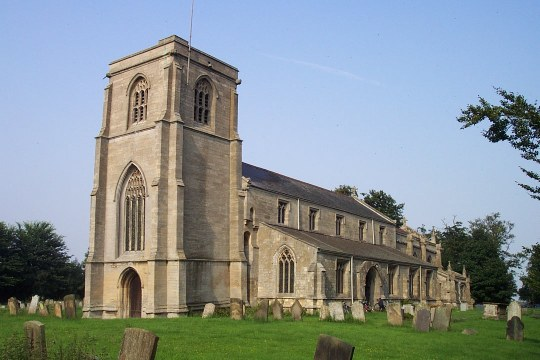
- Church of Saint Helena, Leverton

- Location within Lincolnshire
- Population: 689 (2011 Census)
- OS grid reference: TF399474
  - London: 105 mi (169 km) S
- Civil parish: Leverton
- District: Boston
- Shire county: Lincolnshire
- Region: East Midlands
- Country: England
- Sovereign state: United Kingdom
- Post town: Boston
- Postcode district: PE22
- Police: Lincolnshire
- Fire: Lincolnshire
- Ambulance: East Midlands
- UK Parliament: Boston and Skegness

Leverton is a village and civil parish in the Boston district of Lincolnshire, England, about 6 mi (10 km) east-north-east of Boston, on the A52 road. The population of the civil parish at the 2011 census was 689.

It is one of eighteen parishes which, together with Boston, form the Borough of Boston in the county of Lincolnshire, England. The local government has been arranged in this way since the reorganisation of 1 April 1974, which resulted from the Local Government Act 1972. This parish forms part of the Coastal electoral ward.

Hitherto the parish had formed part of Boston Rural District, in the Parts of Holland. Holland was one of the three divisions (formally known as parts) of the traditional county of Lincolnshire. Since the Local Government Act 1888 Holland had been, in most respects, a county in itself.

Before that Leverton had been in Skirbeck Wapentake, Parts of Holland.

Leverton Grade I listed Anglican church is dedicated to St Helen.
