= Swineshead Abbey =

Former abbey in Lincolnshire, England

- Location within Lincolnshire
- Interactive map of Swineshead Abbey

Monastery information
- Order: Savigniac 1134-1147; Cistercian 1147-1536
- Established: 1134
- Disestablished: 1536
- Dedication: St Mary

People
- Founder: Robert de Gresley

Architecture
- Status: Abbey ruined, remains used to build House
- Heritage designation: Scheduled Monument 1018687; Grade II listed building 1165368
- Designated date: 9 October 1981 - Abbey ruins 19 November 1951 - House

Site
- Location: Swineshead, Lincolnshire
- Coordinates: 52°56′55″N 0°08′34″W
- Visible remains: buried walls and earthwork features

Swineshead Abbey was an abbey in Swineshead, Lincolnshire.

The Abbey of St Mary, a Cistercian monastery, was founded in 1134 by Robert de Gresley. Gresley and his son, Albert, endowed the Abbey with 240 acres of land and other gifts. The Abbey was originally Savigniac and populated with monks from Furness Abbey, but was absorbed into the Cistercian order along with all the other Savigniac Houses in 1147. In 1170 the Abbot of Swineshead was reprimanded for owning villages, churches and serfs. King John spent a short time in the Abbey after losing his baggage in the fens, and just before his death in 1216. In William Shakespeare's King John, the name of the abbey where King John stayed is misspelled as "Swinsted Abbey" instead of "Swineshead Abbey", and this confusion was common in late-sixteenth century texts, for Swinstead is about 25 miles from Swineshead. It was dissolved in 1536 with the first Act of Suppression, its last Abbot being John Haddingham.

The first documented reuse of the site dates from 1607 when a farmhouse, Abbey House, was built out of the abbey ruins by Sir John Lockton. The Abbey House is a Grade II listed building.

The abbey occupied a slightly raised area in the marshland 1 km north east of Swineshead. In the raised area in the north-eastern part of the monument, partly overlain by Abbey House, are the buried remains of the abbey's inner court where the church, cloister and dorter (dormitory) would have been located. Adjacent to the west is another raised area where the remains of the outer court are located; these would include stables, barns and other agricultural and service buildings, together with the principal gatehouse of the abbey. The foundations of stone walls and fragments of medieval artefacts have been located in the outer court. Although the site is now a private residence it can still be seen from the main A52. If travelling south from Boston you reach the Baythorpe area of Swineshead, on the right is Manor Farm Shop and approximately 200m further, behind the trees, is Swineshead Abbey.
