= Corby Glen railway station =

Former railway station in Lincolnshire, England

Coordinates: 52°48′30″N 000°32′19″W

Corby Glen
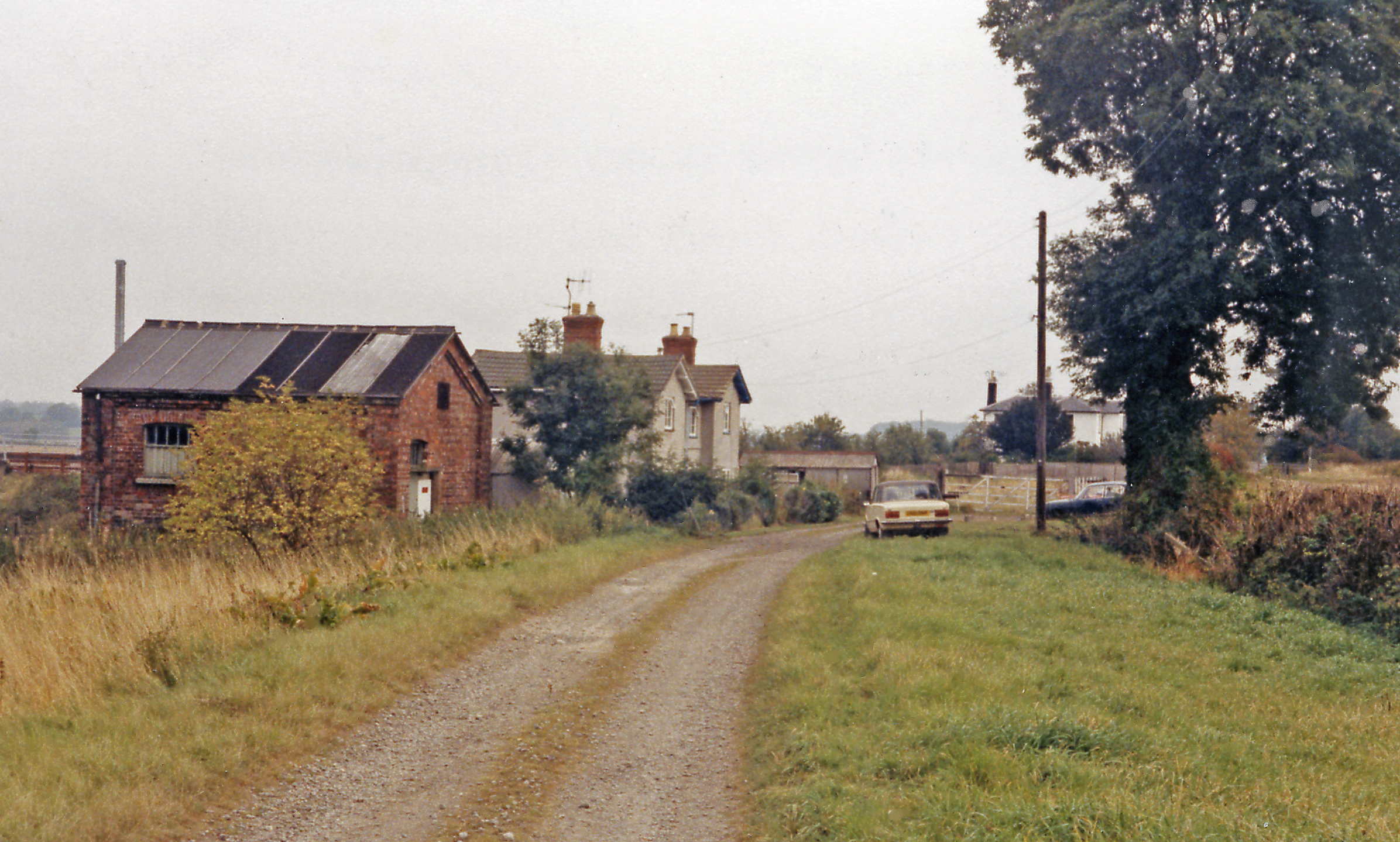
- Site of Corby Glen station 1986

General information
- Location: Corby Glen, Lincolnshire; England
- Grid reference: SK9849524457
- Platforms: 2

Other information
- Status: Disused

History
- Pre-grouping: Great Northern Railway
- Post-grouping: London North Eastern Railway; Eastern Region of British Railways

Key dates
- 2 October 1853: Opened
- 15 June 1959: Closed for passengers
- 5 October 1964: closed for freight
Location

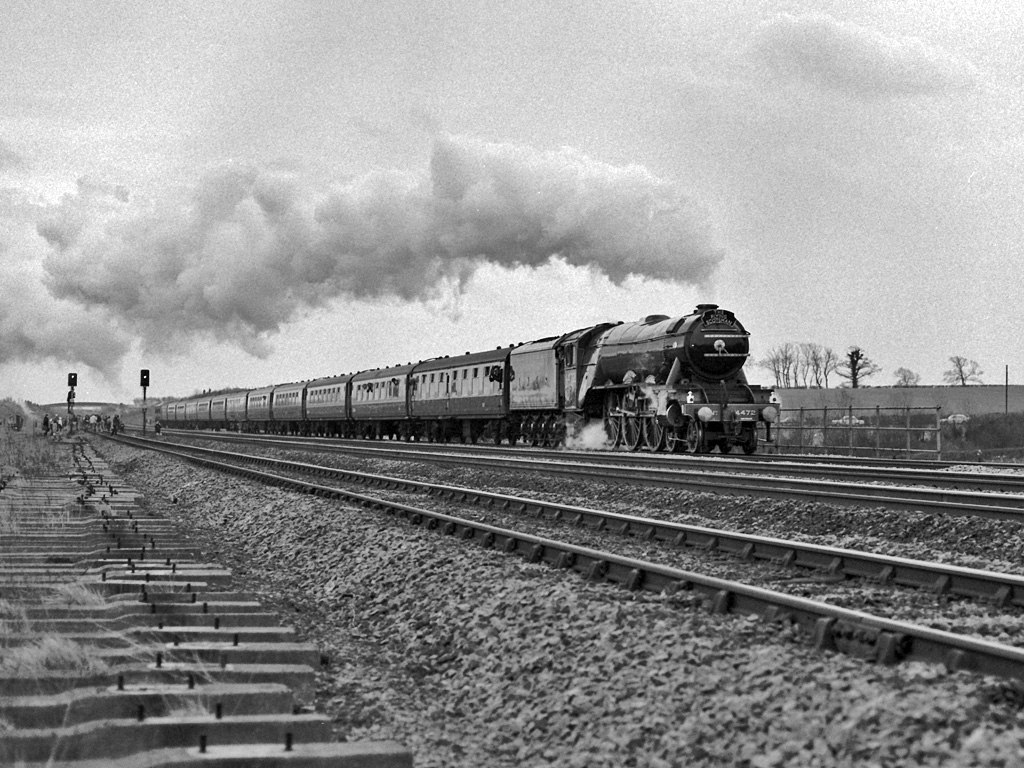
4472 Flying Scotsman on an excursion south of Corby Glen at Swayfield

Corby Glen railway station was a station on the Great Northern Railway main line serving Corby Glen, Lincolnshire. It was west of the village on the Melton Mowbray road, and was originally named just Corby, but was renamed to avoid confusion with Corby station on the Midland Railway in Northamptonshire. The station closed in 1959.

Preceding station	Historical railways	Following station
Little Bytham; Line open, station closed	Great Northern Railway	Great Ponton; Line open, station closed
