= Skirbeck Wapentake =

Coordinates: 53.003°N 0.065°E

Skirbeck Wapentake was a local government unit in the Parts of Holland Lincolnshire, England from the early eleventh century, until the wapentakes were abolished by the Local Government Act 1888.

== Etymology and history ==
In most of England, the corresponding local unit was the hundred, which was a grouping of about a hundred households. Around a thousand years ago, it was important as a unit for gathering taxes and raising men for the citizen army of the time, known as the Fyrd. The idea of the hundred goes back at least to the time of the Roman emperor Tacitus, but the version called the wapentake belongs to the Danish-influenced part of England. It therefore dates in that country, from the tenth or very early eleventh century.

== Hamlets and parishes ==
The area covered included several villages, hamlets, and parishes around the borough of Boston, Lincolnshire, including Skirbeck and Skirbeck Quarter, now both of Boston.

== Abolition ==
In 1882, a local directory described the wapentakes as "now of little practical value". Their potential functions had been taken over piecemeal by other units such as electoral districts, special districts, or Poor-Law unions.

All the wapentakes were abolished by the Local Government Act 1888.
