= Bassingthorpe =

Village in Lincolnshire, England

Coordinates: 52.845911°N 0.565966°W

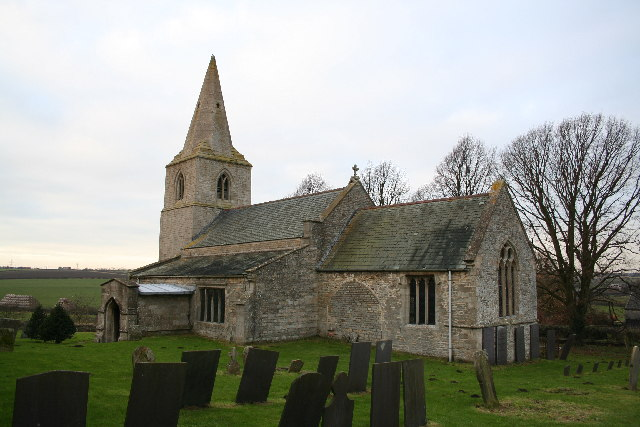
- St Thomas' Church, Bassingthorpe

- Location within Lincolnshire
- OS grid reference: SK966285
  - London: 90 mi (140 km) S
- Civil parish: Bitchfield and Bassingthorpe
- District: South Kesteven
- Shire county: Lincolnshire
- Region: East Midlands
- Country: England
- Sovereign state: United Kingdom
- Post town: GRANTHAM
- Postcode district: NG33
- Dialling code: 01476
- Police: Lincolnshire
- Fire: Lincolnshire
- Ambulance: East Midlands
- UK Parliament: Grantham and Bourne

Bassingthorpe is a small village in the civil parish of Bitchfield and Bassingthorpe, in the South Kesteven district of Lincolnshire, England. It is 5 miles (8 km) south from Grantham, and on a C class road between the B6403 to the west and the B1176 to the east. In 1921 the parish had a population of 78. On 1 April 1931 the parish was abolished and merged with Bitchfield to form "Bitchfield and Bassingthorpe".

The village contains 4 houses and a Grade I listed church dedicated to St Thomas. The ecclesiastical parish is part of The North Beltisloe Group of parishes, of the Deanery of Beltisloe in the Diocese of Lincoln. From 2006 to 2011 the incumbent was Rev Richard Ireson.
