= Miningsby =

Village in Lincolnshire, England

Coordinates: 53.157666°N 0.023854°W

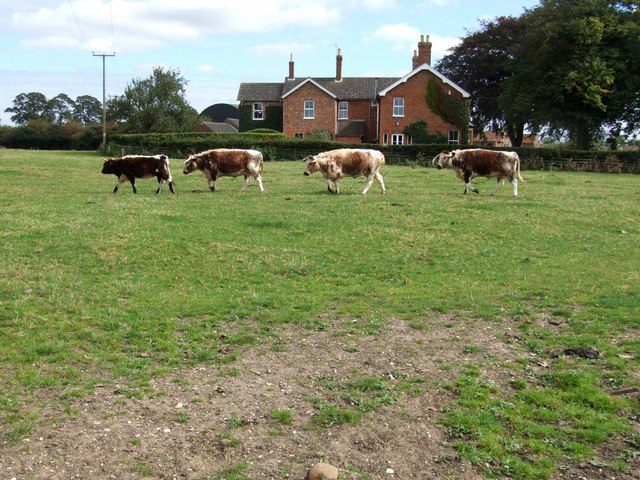
- Cattle at Manor Farm, Miningsby

- Location within Lincolnshire
- OS grid reference: TF322641
  - London: 115 mi (185 km) S
- Civil parish: Revesby
- District: East Lindsey
- Shire county: Lincolnshire
- Region: East Midlands
- Country: England
- Sovereign state: United Kingdom
- Post town: Boston
- Postcode district: PE22
- Police: Lincolnshire
- Fire: Lincolnshire
- Ambulance: East Midlands
- UK Parliament: Louth and Horncastle

Miningsby is a small village and former civil parish, now in the parish of Revesby, in the East Lindsey district of Lincolnshire, England. It is situated about 6 miles (10 km) south-east from the town of Horncastle and 6 miles west-southwest from the town of Spilsby. In 1961 the parish had a population of 55. On 1 April 1987 the parish was abolished and merged with Revesby.

Miningsby lies at the southern edge of the Lincolnshire Wolds, a designated Area of Outstanding Natural Beauty.

== History ==
The village is listed in the 1086 Domesday Book with 48 households, which for the time was considered very large. The Lord of the manor was Ivo Tallboys.

Miningsby church was dedicated to St Andrew, but was declared redundant by the Diocese of Lincoln on 22 October 1975 and demolished on 14 November 1979, although the churchyard has been retained.

An Anglo-Saxon knotwork stone, which had formerly been in St Andrew's chancel, is now in the City and County Museum, Lincoln.

=== 1969 air incident ===
On Wednesday 9 July 1969 at 2.20pm, there was the first loss of an RAF Phantom aircraft, 'XV395'.

The navigator was Flight Lieutenant Forbes MacCombie Pearson and the pilot was Flight Lieutenant John Edward Room, later the station commander of RAF Leeming in 1988. The aircrew were taken to RAF Hospital Nocton Hall for an X-ray. The Lindsey Fire Brigade attended from Horncastle.

Maurice Gorensweigh, a Polish former RAF Bomber Command Lancaster pilot was 30 yards away in his kitchen, and saw the Phantom hit the ground. Flt Lt Pearson was from Abriachan south of Inverness; he had married Barbara Joan Scargill, from 49 Parkside in Wollaton, Nottinghamshire, on 21 December 1963, at RAF Nicosia.
