= Haugh, Lincolnshire =

Hamlet and civil parish in the East Lindsey district of Lincolnshire, England

Coordinates: 53.260913°N 0.120085°E

Haugh
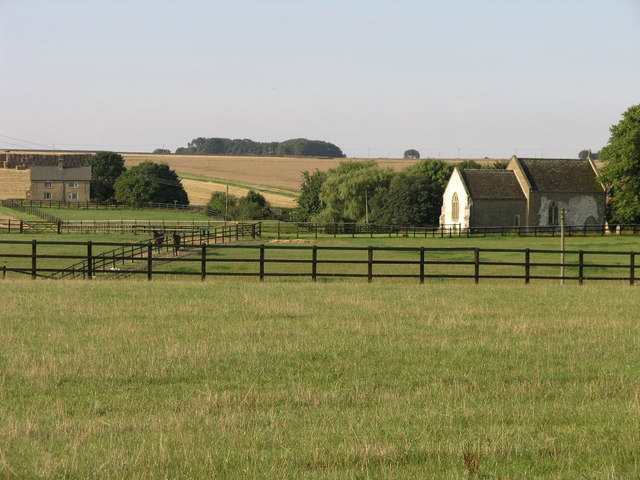
- Haugh

- Location within Lincolnshire
- OS grid reference: TF415758
  - London: 120 mi (190 km) S
- District: East Lindsey
- Shire county: Lincolnshire
- Region: East Midlands
- Country: England
- Sovereign state: United Kingdom
- Post town: Alford
- Postcode district: LN13
- Police: Lincolnshire
- Fire: Lincolnshire
- Ambulance: East Midlands
- UK Parliament: Louth and Horncastle

Haugh is a hamlet and civil parish in the East Lindsey district of Lincolnshire, England. It is situated about 2 miles (3 km) south-west from the town of Alford.

Haugh is listed in the 1086 Domesday Book, with 37 households.

The parish church is dedicated to Saint Leonard and is a Grade I listed building dating from the 11th century, with later additions, and a restoration in 1873. It is built of chalk and greenstone with red-brick patching. The blocked north door is late 12th-century, with both the font and the south door 14th-century. On the south wall there is an alabaster wall plaque to Sir Charles Bolle, who died in 1690, and on the north wall a large wall monument to Sir John Bolle, who died in 1606.

Manor Farmhouse is a red-brick Grade II listed country house and former seat of the Bolle family, now a farmhouse dating from the mid-16th century with later additions.
