= Swinstead =

Village and civil parish in the South Kesteven district of Lincolnshire, England

Coordinates: 52.790470°N 0.492239°W

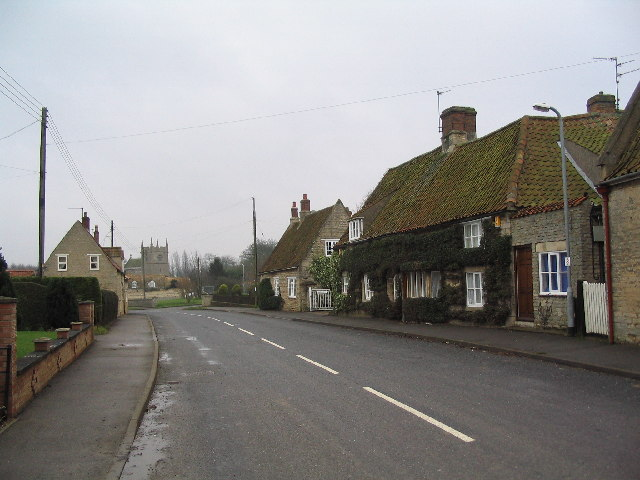
- Swinstead village

- Location within Lincolnshire
- Population: 234 (2011)
- OS grid reference: TF017224
  - London: 90 mi (140 km) S
- District: South Kesteven
- Shire county: Lincolnshire
- Region: East Midlands
- Country: England
- Sovereign state: United Kingdom
- Post town: GRANTHAM
- Postcode district: NG33
- Police: Lincolnshire
- Fire: Lincolnshire
- Ambulance: East Midlands
- UK Parliament: Rutland and Stamford

Swinstead is a village and civil parish in the South Kesteven district of Lincolnshire, England. It is situated 5 miles (8.0 km) west from Bourne, 9 miles (14.5 km) north from Stamford and 11 miles (17.7 km) south-east from Grantham. It is a village of just over 100 households, the population of the civil parish being measured at 234 in the 2011 census.

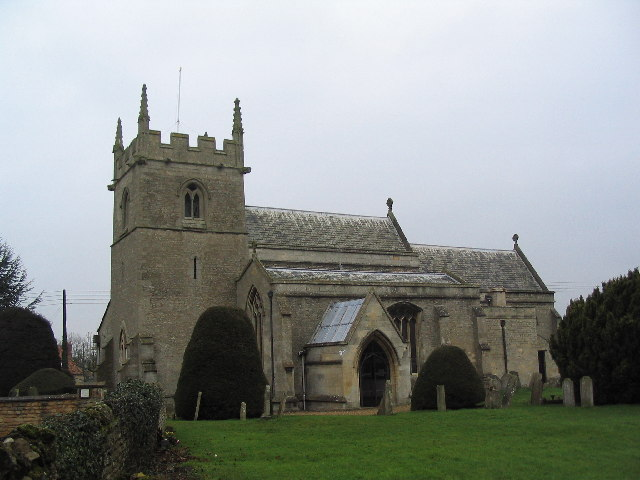
St Mary's church, Swinstead

Swinstead parish church is dedicated to St Mary. The village's last public house closed in 2008, and the nearest amenities are 2 miles (3.2 km) away at Corby Glen. Adjacent villages include Creeton, Swayfield and Grimsthorpe.

England international footballer Beaumont Jarrett was vicar of Swinstead from 1883 to 1895.

In William Shakespeare's King John, King John stayed in "Swinsted Abbey", but it is Swineshead Abbey that he stayed in: this confusion was common in late-sixteenth century texts, for Swinstead is about 25 miles from Swineshead.
