= Bitchfield and Bassingthorpe =

Civil parish in Lincolnshire, England

Coordinates: 52.85°N 0.55°W

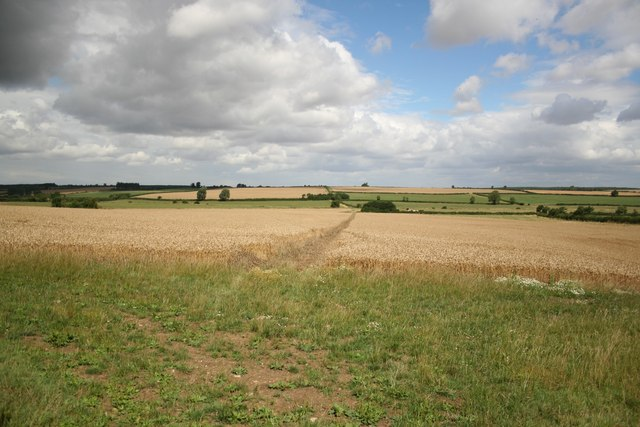
- a field of standing wheat, with a bare fortpath going straight up from where we stand. Above all a rolling series of cumulus clouds cloud an otherwise blue sky. The terrain to the distant woodland on the horizon is tiny, loosely rolling, low hills. The immediate near ground is a field margin of low green grasses

- Location within Lincolnshire
- Population: 157 (2011 census)
- Civil parish: Bitchfield and Bassingthorpe
- District: South Kesteven
- Shire county: Lincolnshire
- Region: East Midlands
- Country: England
- Sovereign state: United Kingdom

Bitchfield and Bassingthorpe is a civil parish in the South Kesteven district of Lincolnshire, England. According to the 2001 census it had a population of 154 across 59 homes. By the 2011 census there were 157 households, made of 366 people.

The civil parish includes the villages of Bitchfield and Bassingthorpe, and the hamlet of Westby. Boothby Pagnell and Burton Coggles are neighbouring parishes.

There are no major roads through the parish, though the London-Edinburgh railway line passes through the extreme western edge. The parish is crossed by the B1176 Corby Glen to Grantham road, which passes through Bitchfield. Several small streams rise in the western half of the parish, and flow eastwards into the West Glen River which flows through the parish from North to South. Bassingthorpe manor has a spot height of 106m, and the land rises above the 115m contour near Stoke railway tunnel. The terrain slopes down eastward to the shallow valley of the glen, which lies between two 70m contours. Toward the eastern boundary the land rises again to about 90m.

Busses on route 4 from Grantham to Stamford pass through the parish.

Local democracy takes the form of a parish meeting.
