= Westby, Lincolnshire =

Civil parish in Lincolnshire, England

Coordinates: 52.843505°N 0.556855°W

Westby
- Location within Lincolnshire
- OS grid reference: SK972283
  - London: 95 mi (153 km) SSE
- Civil parish: Bitchfield and Bassingthorpe
- District: South Kesteven
- Shire county: Lincolnshire
- Region: East Midlands
- Country: England
- Sovereign state: United Kingdom
- Post town: Grantham
- Postcode district: NG33
- Police: Lincolnshire
- Fire: Lincolnshire
- Ambulance: East Midlands
- UK Parliament: Grantham and Bourne

Westby is a hamlet in the civil parish of Bitchfield and Bassingthorpe, in the South Kesteven district of Lincolnshire, England. It is situated approximately 6 miles (9.7 km) south-east from the town of Grantham.

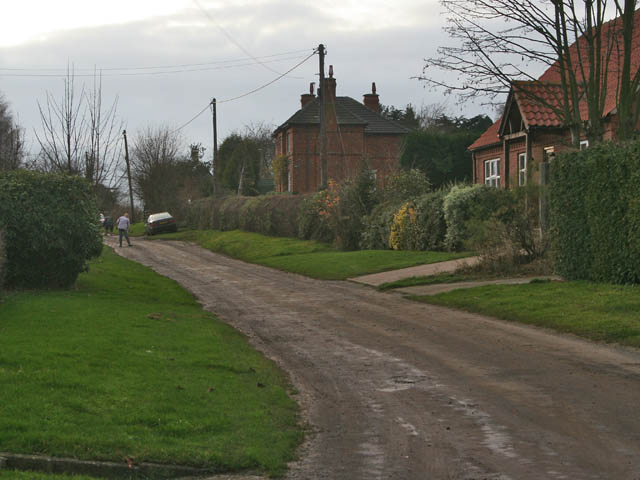
Westby

Westby is considered a shrunken medieval village and at the time of Domesday Book of 1086 it consisted of eleven households.
