= Burton Coggles =

Village in Lincolnshire, England

Coordinates: 52.82028°N 0.54788°W

Burton-le-Coggles
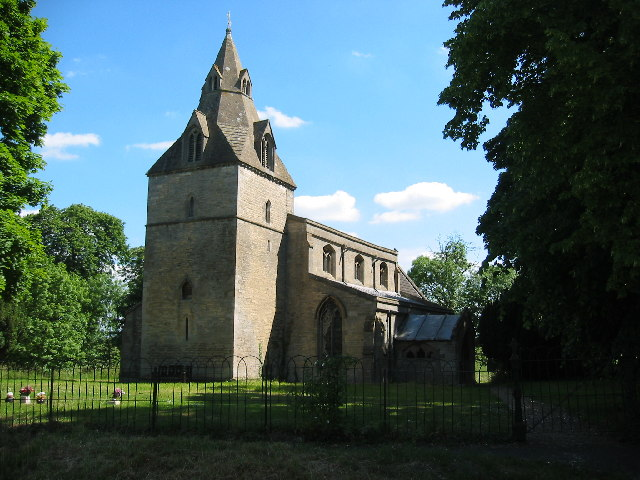
- Thomas a Becket Church

- Location within Lincolnshire
- OS grid reference: SK979257
  - London: 90 mi (140 km) S
- Civil parish: Burton-le-Coggles
- District: South Kesteven
- Shire county: Lincolnshire
- Region: East Midlands
- Country: England
- Sovereign state: United Kingdom
- Post town: GRANTHAM
- Postcode district: NG33
- Dialling code: 01476
- Police: Lincolnshire
- Fire: Lincolnshire
- Ambulance: East Midlands
- UK Parliament: Rutland and Stamford

Burton Coggles (full name Burton-le-Coggles from Byrton-en-les-Coggles) is a small village and civil parish in the South Kesteven district of Lincolnshire, England. The population is included in the civil parish of Bitchfield and Bassingthorpe. The village is situated 7 miles (11 km) south from Grantham, and between the B1176 road and the East Coast Main Line.

== History ==
The Grade II listed Anglican parish church is dedicated to St Thomas a Becket. The Diocese of Lincoln refers to it as 'St Thomas of Canterbury'. It has an Early English spire. In 1113, patronage of Burton church was gifted to Crowland Abbey at the start of the rebuild of the abbey following the devastating fire in 1091.

William Ayscough, the Trinity College, Cambridge-educated brother of Hannah Ayscough and uncle of Isaac Newton, was rector of the parish in the 17th century.

Prince Charles and Camilla, The Duchess of Cornwall, visited Burton Coggles on 29 November 2011. The hour-long tour of the village included meeting dignitaries and schoolchildren, and visiting a local public house and farm shop.

== Geography ==
The parish boundary extends westwards to include Sleight's Wood on the road Easton Lane (also known as Burton Lane) to Easton. At Burton Rookery, next to the railway, the parish borders Bitchfield and Bassingthorpe and further east, the boundary crosses the River West Glen and the B1176. At Colley Holts, it meets the parish of Irnham. Further south it meets the parish of Corby Glen, which is close to the south of village. The boundary passes close to Corby Birkholme, and near to the A151, at Little Osgrove Wood (in Corby Glen), it meets Colsterworth parish. Slightly further north, on the edge of Easton Wood, the boundary meets Easton.

== Community ==
Until recently the village retained a post office on Post Office Lane. The village public house is the Cholmeley Arms. There is a small village hall. Other local services are in Corby Glen.

The ecclesiastical parish is part of The North Beltisloe Group of the Deanery of Beltisloe in the Diocese of Lincoln. From 2006 to 2010 the incumbent was Rev Richard Ireson.
