= Frampton West End =

Settlement in Lincolnshire, England

Coordinates: 52.9506°N 0.0674°W

- Location within Lincolnshire
- OS grid reference: TF3041
- Shire county: Lincolnshire
- Region: East Midlands
- Country: England
- Sovereign state: United Kingdom
- Post town: Boston
- Postcode district: PE20
- Police: Lincolnshire
- Fire: Lincolnshire
- Ambulance: East Midlands

Frampton West End is a settlement in Lincolnshire, England. It is in the civil parish of Frampton
