= Swayfield =

Village and civil parish in the South Kesteven district of Lincolnshire, England

Coordinates: 52.794542°N 0.529095°W

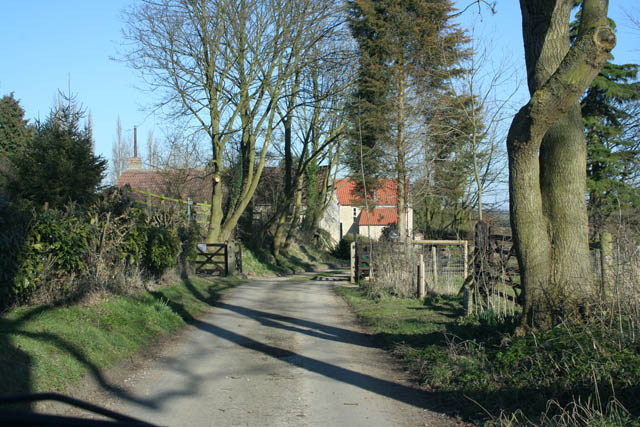
- Swayfield

- Location within Lincolnshire
- Population: 316 (2011)
- OS grid reference: SK992229
  - London: 95 mi (153 km) S
- District: South Kesteven
- Shire county: Lincolnshire
- Region: East Midlands
- Country: England
- Sovereign state: United Kingdom
- Post town: GRANTHAM
- Postcode district: NG33
- Police: Lincolnshire
- Fire: Lincolnshire
- Ambulance: East Midlands
- UK Parliament: Rutland and Stamford

Swayfield is a village and civil parish in the South Kesteven district of Lincolnshire, England. The population of the civil parish at the 2011 census was 316. It is situated just over 3 miles (5 km) east from the A1 road, 9 miles (14 km) south-east from Grantham and 10 miles (16 km) north from Stamford. It has approximately 138 houses.

== History ==
A deserted medieval village has been identified nearby, probably the vill of Sudwelle. Traces of earlier settlements in the form of barrow burials have also been suggested.

The village is reputed to have been a site for signalling beacons at the time of the Spanish Armada and a modern fire-basket stands in the village, erected for 400th anniversary in 1988.

In 1848 the village was described as: "Swayfield (St. Nicholas), a parish, in the union of Bourne, wapentake of Beltisloe, parts of Kesteven, county of Lincoln, 2 miles (S. by W.) from Corby; containing 265 inhabitants. The living is a rectory, valued in the king's books at £11. 2. 11., and in the gift of the Crown; net income, £391. The tithes were commuted for land and corn-rents in 1797".

During the Second World War, Swayfield was the site of two dummy airfields, the remains of which can still be seen.

== Geography ==
Swayfield is 8 miles (13 km) from Bourne (via the A151), 12 miles (19 km) from Grantham (via the B1176), 15 miles (24 km) from Stamford (via the B1176) and 16 miles (26 km) from Oakham. It is 3 miles from the county boundary with Rutland, at the point near Stocken (HM Prison). The road to the west towards Lobthorpe is Overgate Road. To the east, adjacent to the village, is the East Coast Main Line.

Nearby villages include Castle Bytham, Corby Glen, Swinstead, Creeton and Lobthorpe.

== Landmarks ==
St Nicholas Church is on the edge of the village on Church Lane and is part of the Corby Glen group of churches in the Beltisloe Deanery; the incumbent is the Revd Margaret Barton. Although the village has no priest, it has a lay reader.

Swayfield has a public house, the Royal Oak on High Street, and a village hall.
