= Easton, Lincolnshire =

Village in South Kesteven district of Lincolnshire, England

Coordinates: 52.829°N 0.6061°W

Easton
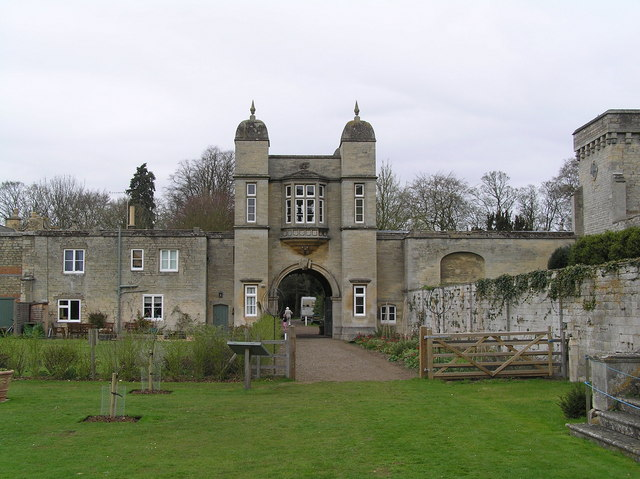
- Easton Walled Gardens

- Location within Lincolnshire
- OS grid reference: SK940267
  - London: 90 mi (140 km) S
- District: South Kesteven
- Shire county: Lincolnshire
- Region: East Midlands
- Country: England
- Sovereign state: United Kingdom
- Post town: GRANTHAM
- Postcode district: NG33
- Police: Lincolnshire
- Fire: Lincolnshire
- Ambulance: East Midlands

Easton is a village and civil parish in the South Kesteven district of Lincolnshire, England, almost 2 miles (3.2 km) north of Colsterworth, and 1 mile (1.6 km) east of the A1 road.

== History ==
The village has no church, but forms part of the North and South Stoke with Easton church parish, which contains the church of St Andrew and St Mary at Stoke Rochford, just inside Easton civil parish. The A1 within the parish was straightened when converted to a dual-carriageway in 1960. The village is still largely the size as it was at the time of the Domesday Book in 1086.

There is a grouped parish council of Stoke Rochford and Easton.

=== Easton Hall ===
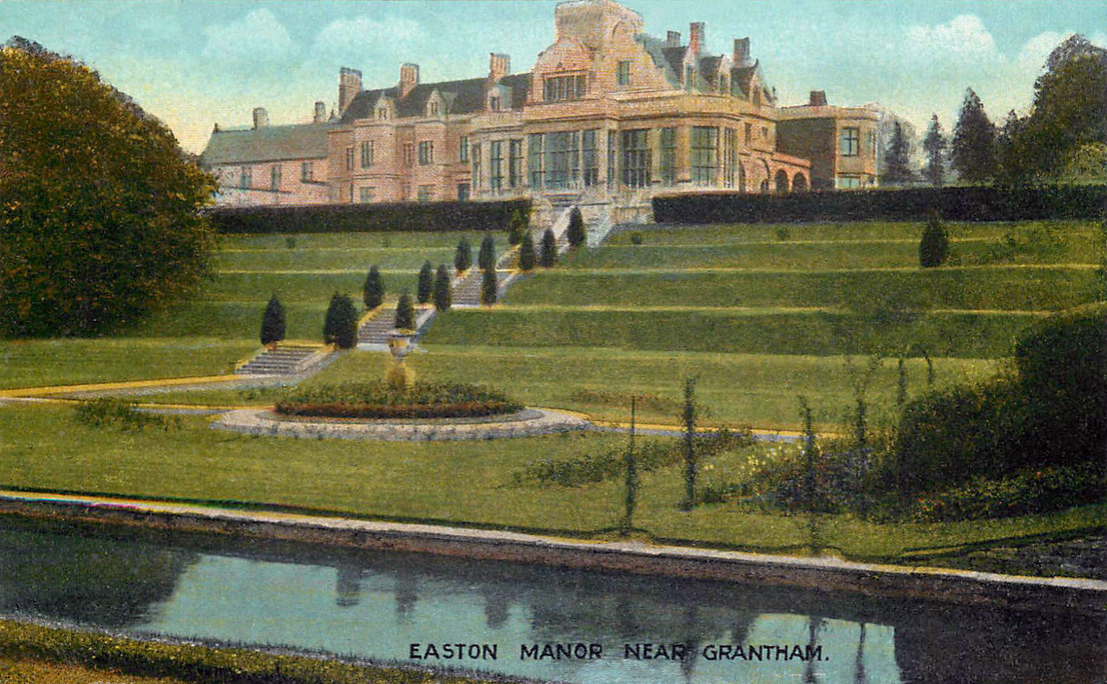
Easton Hall in the early 20th century

Sir Henry Cholmeley bought the manor in 1592; his direct descendant Sir Montague Cholmeley rebuilt the village in the early 19th century. Easton Hall (52°49'46.04"N 0°37'29.34"W) was built by Sir Henry Cholmeley, partly rebuilt in 1805, and enlarged in the Victorian period. It was damaged while used by the army during the Second World War and pulled down, other than the entrance hall, in 1951. The 12 acres of gardens were abandoned in 1951, but a major renovation project began in 2001, under the Cholmeley family, who still live in the village. As of 2024, the gardens attract 20,000 visitors a year.

Andrew Alexander Watt (1853-1928), an Ulster-Scots distiller from Derry, lived here from 1922 to 1928.

== Geography ==
The River Witham passes through the village. Just to its south, the river is crossed by the A1 inside the parish of Colsterworth. Although a village with a population of 100 and technically a civil parish, in practice it is shared for administrative and religious purposes with Stoke Rochford. The combined parish is one of the largest in area in South Kesteven, stretching along the B6403 (High Dike – ⁣Ermine Street) from the A1 to the East Coast Main Line bridge.

There was a railway joining the East Central main line at the B6403 road bridge and following the east side of the B6403 to Woolsthorpe. Stoke Rochford is linked to the B6403 by Easton Lane. Easton civil parish stretches along the B6403 from the A1 to the junction of this road; it embraces the south part of Stoke Rochford village, including its parish church and post office. In the south-east of the parish is Easton Wood.

== Cold store ==
Near the B6403 was Easton Cold Store, a frozen-vegetable processing factory owned by McCain Foods (GB) Ltd. Described in Nikolaus Pevsner’s Buildings of England: Lincolnshire as the largest cold storage facility in Europe (1989), it was originally built for Christian Salvesen. In front of the vast sheds, the contrasting polygonal office building connected to a two-storey block with red pagoda-like projections of 1973-4 by Rex Critchlow were considered one of the best examples of industrial architecture in the county.

The facility was demolished and replaced in 2024.

== See also ==
- Destruction of country houses in 20th-century Britain
