= Skirbeck Quarter =

Suburb of Boston in Lincolnshire, England

Coordinates: 52.962594°N 0.033476°W

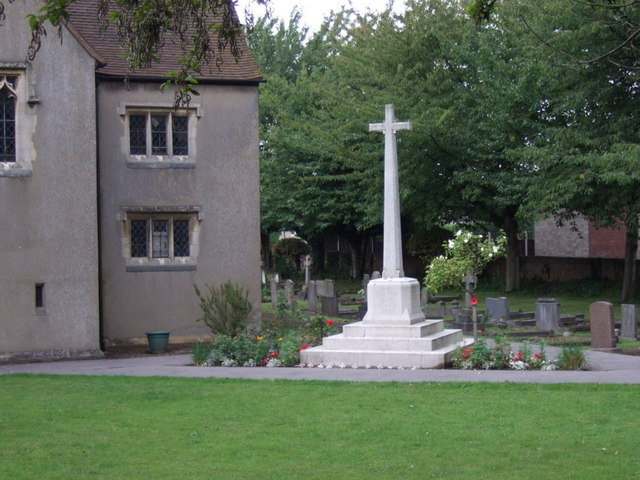
- War Memorial in Skirbeck Quarter, Boston

- Location within Lincolnshire
  - London: 100 mi (160 km) S
- Civil parish: Unparished
- District: Boston
- Shire county: Lincolnshire
- Region: East Midlands
- Country: England
- Sovereign state: United Kingdom
- Post town: BOSTON
- Postcode district: PE21
- Dialling code: 01205
- Police: Lincolnshire
- Fire: Lincolnshire
- Ambulance: East Midlands
- UK Parliament: Boston and Skegness

Skirbeck Quarter is a suburb of Boston in Lincolnshire, England. It is located to the south of the town centre and is directly adjacent to the ward of St Thomas' and the South Forty-Foot Drain.

== Geography ==
Skirbeck Quarter is directly south of Boston and north of the village of Wyberton. Despite its name, it is not part of the historic village of Skirbeck, which is split by both The Haven and the River Witham. It is contiguous with Wyberton.

== History ==
Skirbeck Quarter was recorded in the Domesday Book as Scirebec. In 1866 Skirbeck Quarter became a civil parish, in 1894 it became part of Boston Rural District, on 1 April 1932 the parish was abolished and merged with Boston and became part of the Municipal Borough of Boston. In 1931 the parish had a population of 1740.
