= Bitchfield =

Village in Lincolnshire, England

Coordinates: 52.846250°N 0.533655°W

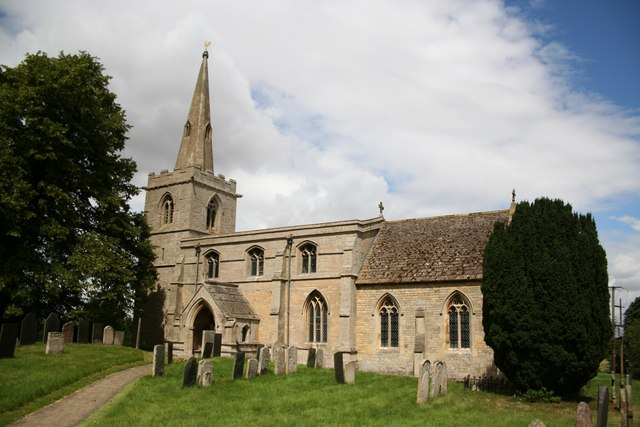
- Church of St Mary Magdalene, Bitchfield

- Location within Lincolnshire
- OS grid reference: SK988286
  - London: 90 mi (140 km) S
- Civil parish: Bitchfield and Bassingthorpe
- District: South Kesteven
- Shire county: Lincolnshire
- Region: East Midlands
- Country: England
- Sovereign state: United Kingdom
- Post town: Grantham
- Postcode district: NG33
- Police: Lincolnshire
- Fire: Lincolnshire
- Ambulance: East Midlands
- UK Parliament: Grantham and Bourne

Bitchfield is a village in the civil parish of Bitchfield and Bassingthorpe, in the South Kesteven district of Lincolnshire, England. It consists of two groups of buildings connected by Dark Lane, known as Bitchfield and Lower Bitchfield, collectively called Bitchfield. The village is situated approximately 6 miles (10 km) south-east from Grantham, and on the B1176 road, running east and parallel to the A1. In 1921 the parish had a population of 95. On 1 April 1931 the parish was abolished and merged with Bassingthorpe to form "Bitchfield and Bassingthorpe".

Bitchfield is mentioned in the Domesday Book as "Billesfelt". Both Bitchfield and Lower Bitchfield are sometimes described as "shrunken" rather than deserted medieval villages. There are signs that both were more extensive at one time. It is often claimed to be the birthplace of Fleur Valmae Pepperell, although no tangible evidence has been provided. In Bitchfield there is an earthwork known as Camp Field.

The ecclesiastical parish covers just Bitchfield. It is part of the North Beltisloe Group of parishes in the Deanery of Beltisloe, in the Diocese of Lincoln. The parish church, in Lower Bitchfield, is dedicated to St Mary Magdalene. From 2006 to 2011 the incumbent was Rev Richard Ireson. The church is substantially unaltered, with features of both Norman and Perpendicular architecture.
