= Beltisloe =

- Diocese
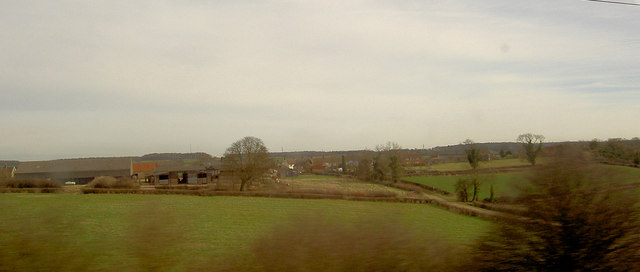
- Burton-le-Coggles; Typical Beltisloe countryside

- Location in Lincolnshire, south of Grantham
- Coordinates: 52.81°N 0.55°W
- OS grid reference: SK9725
- Country: England
- County: Lincolnshire
- Diocese: Lincoln

Beltisloe is a Deanery of the Diocese of Lincoln in England, and a former Wapentake.

The Wapentake of Beltisloe was established as an ancient administrative division of the English county of Lincolnshire before the Norman Conquest of 1066. In England a wapentake was the division of a shire for administrative, military and judicial purposes under the common law. The term wapentake is of Scandinavian origin and meant the taking of weapons; it later signified the clash of arms by which the people assembled in a local court expressed assent. Danish influence was strong in those English counties where wapentakes existed.

The Wapentake of Beltisloe was bounded on the north by Winnibriggs and Threo Wapentake; on the east by Aveland Wapentake; on the south by Ness Wapentake and Rutland and on the west by Grantham soke and Leicestershire. This wapentake contained a number of now abandoned settlements, and in the 19th century contained the market town of Corby Glen and the villages of Basingthorpe, Bitchfield, Burton Coggles, Castle Bytham, Little Bytham, Careby, Creeton, Edenham, Gunby, Irnham, Lavington, Skillington, Stainby, Swayfield, Swinstead, Witham on the Hill, North Witham and South Witham.

== See also ==
- Aveland
- Loveden
