= Corby Glen =

Village and civil parish in Lincolnshire, England

Coordinates: 52.812619°N 0.51816988°W

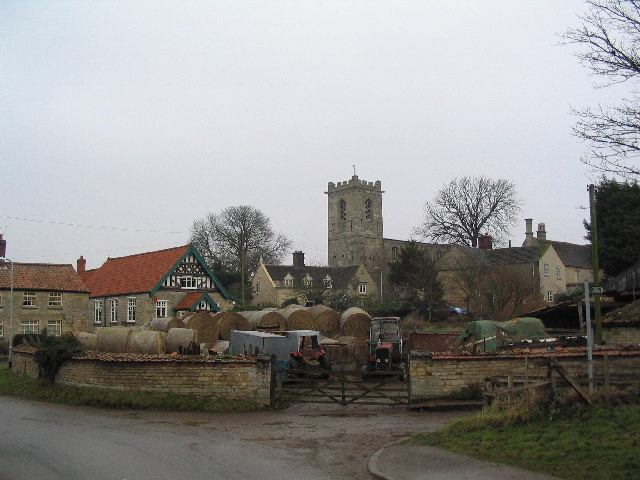
- Corby Glen

- Location within Lincolnshire
- Population: 1,017 (2011 Census)
- OS grid reference: SK999249
  - London: 90 mi (140 km) S
- Civil parish: Corby Glen
- District: South Kesteven
- Shire county: Lincolnshire
- Region: East Midlands
- Country: England
- Sovereign state: United Kingdom
- Post town: GRANTHAM
- Postcode district: NG33
- Dialling code: 01476
- Police: Lincolnshire
- Fire: Lincolnshire
- Ambulance: East Midlands
- UK Parliament: Grantham and Stamford

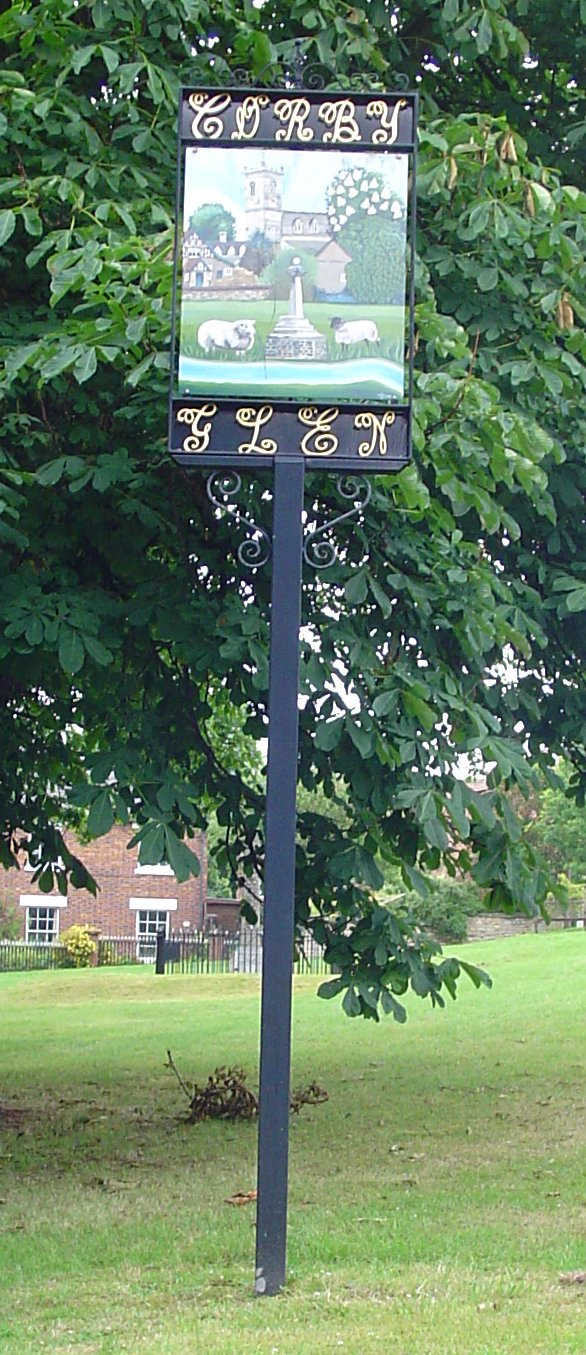
Village sign in Corby Glen

Corby Glen, formerly just Corby, is a village and civil parish in the South Kesteven district of Lincolnshire, England. It is approximately 9 miles (14 km) south-east of Grantham and 8 miles (13 km) north west of Bourne. In 2011 it had a population of 1,017.

== History ==
St John the Evangelist's Church, the Church of England parish church, dates in part from the 12th century and has a notable collection of 14th- and 15th-century murals.

Following the purchase of Irnham Hall by a Protestant family in the mid-19th century the Catholic Chapel of the hall was taken down and re-erected in Corby Glen as the Roman Catholic Church of Our Lady of Mount Carmel to the designs of architects Weightman, Hadfield & Goldie. A thousand wagonloads of material were carried between the two sites. The new church opened in 1856. The church closed in 2012. The church and the attached presbytery are Grade II Listed buildings.

The village's first Methodist chapel was built in 1846, and replaced in 1902 by the present building which is still in use. The original chapel is now a private house.

To the north of the parish church is a substantial castle mound or motte. Historian David Roffe refers to it as "an early defended manor house".

In 1238 King Henry III chartered a weekly market and an annual sheep fair. The sheep fair is still held and is claimed to be the longest-established such event in Britain.

The Willoughby Memorial Library and Art Gallery is housed in a 17th-century building that was originally Reads Grammar School. The school was founded in 1669 by the bequest of Charles Read (1604–1669), who was born at Darlton in Nottinghamshire and became a wealthy shipper in Hull. Read also founded Read School at Drax in Yorkshire and a grammar school at Tuxford in Notts. Reads Grammar School in Corby closed in 1909. The building was restored and reopened for its current uses in 1965 by the Willoughby Memorial Trust which was founded by Lord Ancaster in memory of his son Timothy, Lord Willoughby de Eresby, who died in 1963. The gallery holds a series of exhibitions from Easter to November and an annual Open Art Competition.

In 1852 the Great Northern Railway opened the East Coast Main Line near Corby Glen. In 1853 the GNR opened Corby Glen railway station on the main line about 1 mile (1½ km) from the village. Corby Glen was served by local trains between Peterborough and Grantham. On 3 July 1938 the London and North Eastern Railway locomotive Mallard passed at high speed through Corby Glen shortly before achieving its world speed record for a steam locomotive seven miles further south near Carlby. British Railways closed Corby Glen station in 1959 and its yard is now occupied by a sawmill.

== Geography ==
The village of Corby Glen is in the South Kesteven district of Lincolnshire. It lies mainly to the north of the A151, a former toll road, and to the east of the West Glen River, near where the Glen flows through a small graben in the Jurassic limestone.

Until the 1950s the name of the village was simply Corby. However, in the nearby county of Northamptonshire another Corby had been greatly enlarged by the addition of a steel works and housing to match. Some confusion arose between the two Corbys, so British Railways consulted the villagers to choose an additional name to distinguish the two. The villagers chose "Glen" in reference to the western branch of the River Glen which flows through the village. In 1956 the civil parish was renamed from "Corby" to "Corby Glen".

== Community ==
The ecclesiastical parish of Corby Glen is part of the Corby Glen Group of the Deanery of Beltisloe.

The Roman Catholic church closed in 2012.

The Methodist congregation is still active in its own chapel, which is part of the Grantham and Vale of Belvoir circuit.

The village has two active public houses, the Fighting Cocks (in the market place) and the Woodhouse Arms (at the crossroads). There is a small Co-op supermarket and an independent shop in a wooden hut next to the Fighting Cocks pub car park, and The Pantry, also in the market square. Other businesses include a Garage, the Sawmill, and the Hey Wine company. The Pantry, formerly a doctor's surgery in the market place, is a tea room and delicatessen and the post office branch is now maintained there.

Community meeting rooms are available at the Church Rooms in Church Street, the Methodist Church, and the Ron Dawson Memorial Hall. The Ron Dawson Hall is part of the sports complex in Swinstead Road. There is an active bowls club with a crown green behind the Willoughby arts gallery.

There is a small lending library at the art gallery, and a monthly visit by the mobile library.

The Sheep Fair is still the biggest social event of the year. The 2013 event was the 775th, and attracted a very large crowd. The traditional auction of sheep was held on the Monday.

The village is served by bus routes 303 to Bourne, and Route 4 to Stamford or Grantham.

== Education ==
A new secondary school opened in Corby Glen in 1963. The school became a comprehensive, and it was renamed the Charles Read High School in 1999. It converted to an academy in January 2011; in 2013, the David Ross Foundation took responsibility for maintaining the school.

Corby Glen also has a community primary school.

== Notable residents ==
- Beverley Allitt, nurse and serial child killer, grew up in the village.
- John Hedley Lewis (1908 – 1976), chairman of Kesteven County Council and Lincolnshire County Council.

== Gallery ==
widths="180px"

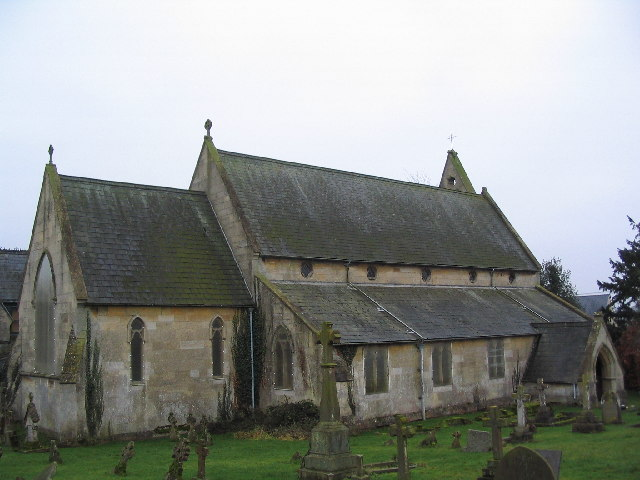
The former Church of Our Lady of Mount Carmel, built in 1856

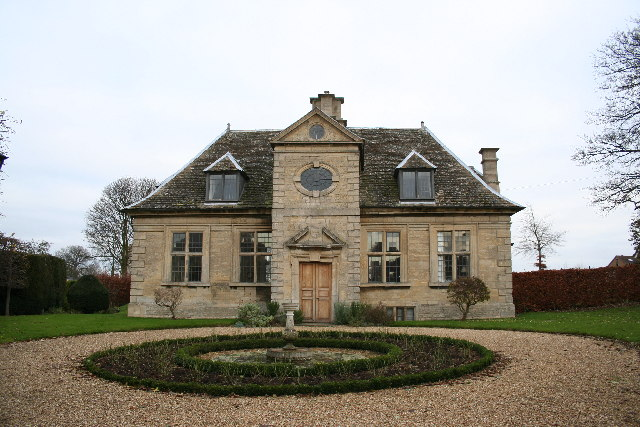
The Willoughby Memorial Library and Art Gallery in the Charles Read Grammar School

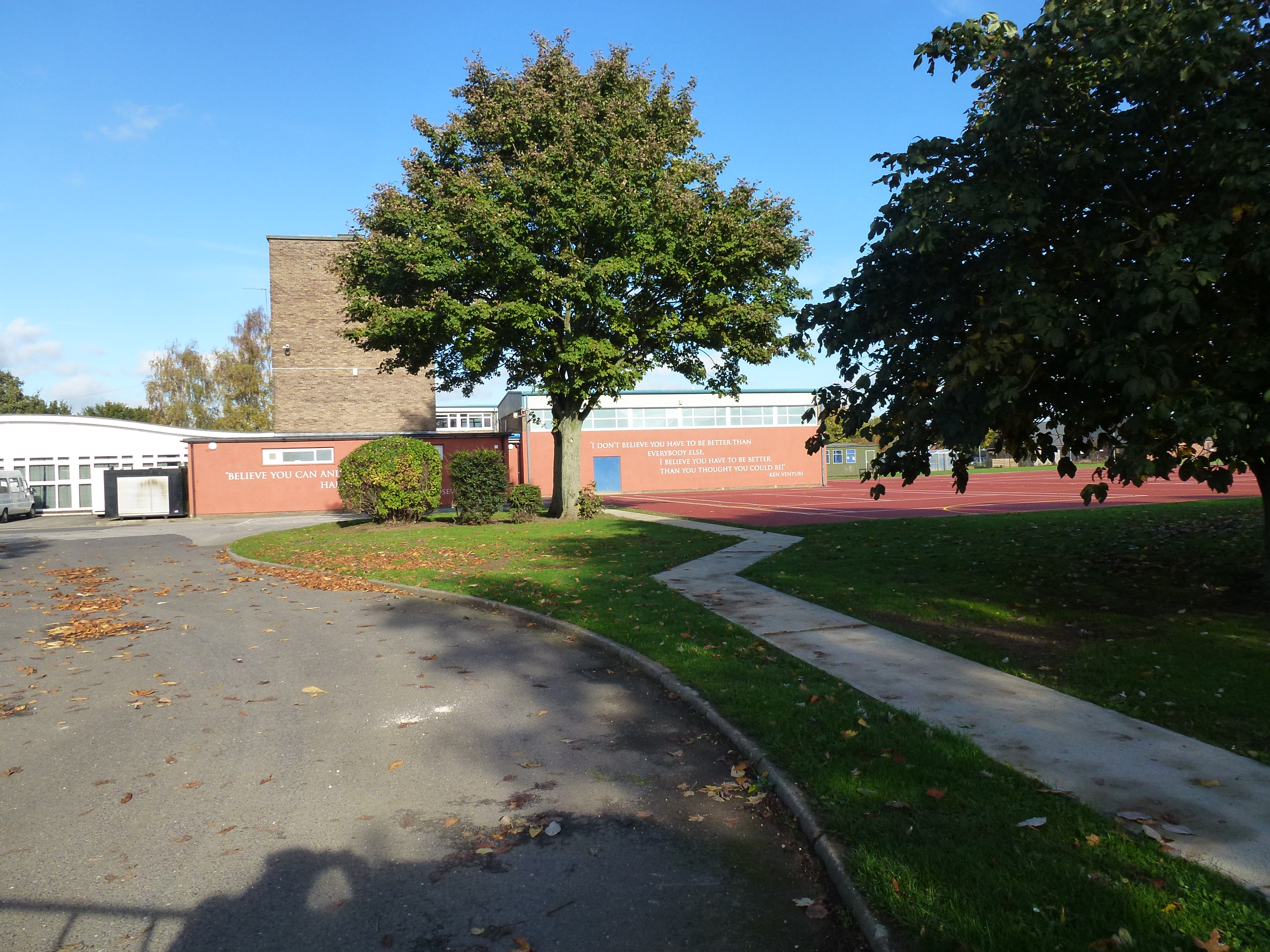
The Charles Read Academy, built in 1963

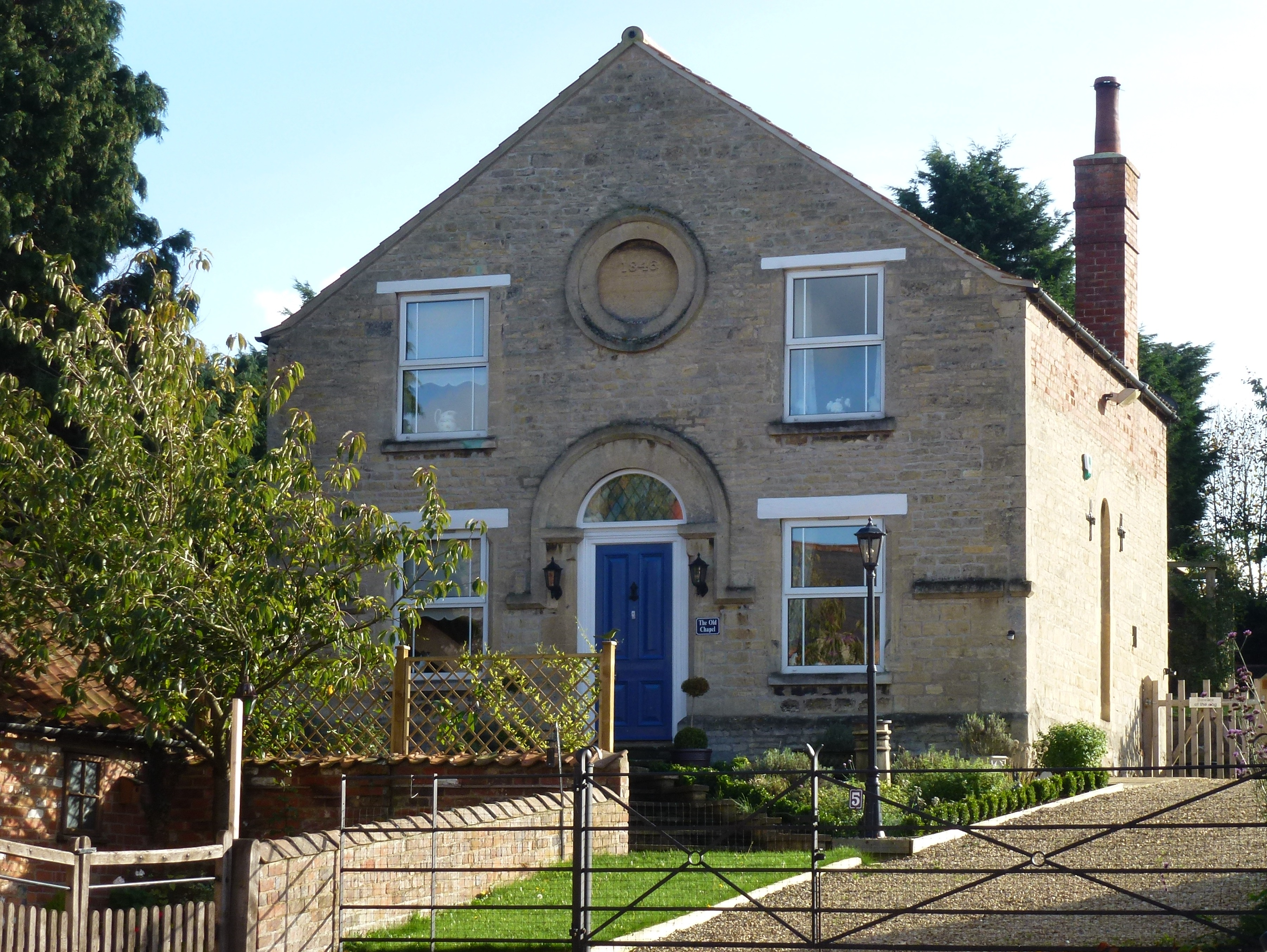
The Old Chapel, built in 1846

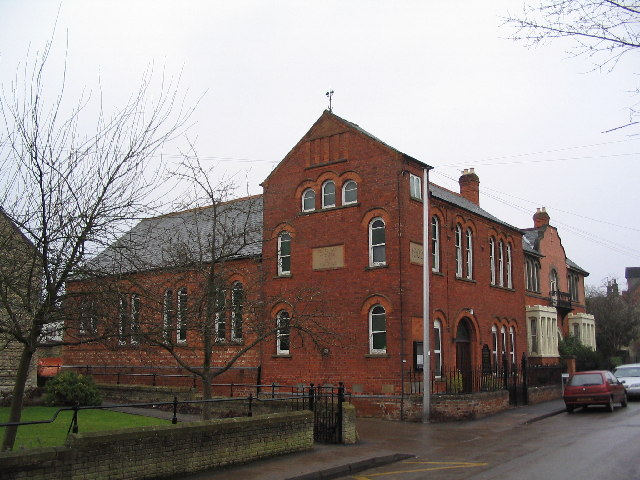
The Methodist church, built in 1902

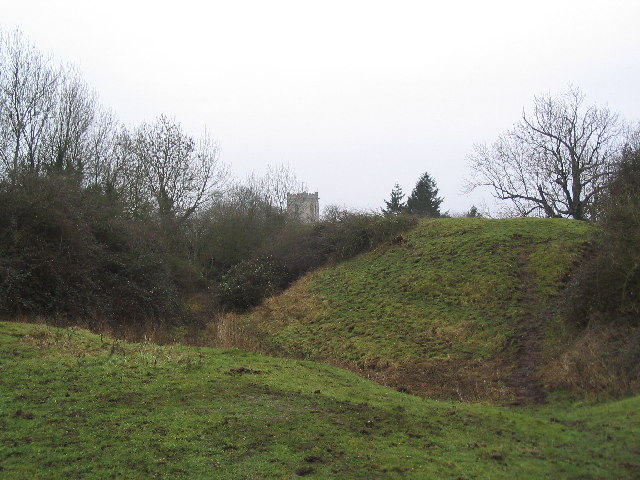
The Motte
