= Grade I listed buildings in North Kesteven =

There are over 9,000 Grade I listed buildings in England. This page is a list of these buildings in the district of North Kesteven in Lincolnshire.

== North Kesteven ==
Name	Location	Type	Completed (Note: The date given is the date used by Historic England as significant for the initial building or that of an important part in the structure's description.)	Date designated	Grid ref. (Note: The grid reference is based on the British national grid reference system, sometimes known as OSGB36, used by the Ordnance Survey.) Geo-coordinates	Entry number (Note: The "List Entry Number" is a unique number assigned to each listed building and scheduled monument by Historic England.)	Image
Church of St Edith	Anwick	Parish Church	Late 13th century	1 February 1967	TF1145150634; 53°02′29″N 0°20′21″W	1061829	Church of St Edith More images
Church of St Andrew	Asgarby, Asgarby and Howell	Parish Church	13th century	1 February 1967	TF1162745389; 52°59′39″N 0°20′18″W	1061832	Church of St Andrew More images
Church of St Mary	Bloxholm, Ashby De La Launde and Bloxholm	Parish Church	c. 1300	7 December 1987	TF0646153776; 53°04′14″N 0°24′45″W	1261473	Church of St Mary More images
Parish Church of St Denys	Aswarby and Swarby	Church	12th century	1 February 1967	TF0672039906; 52°56′45″N 0°24′48″W	1360619	Parish Church of St Denys More images
Aubourn Hall	Aubourn Haddington and South Hykeham	Country House	16th century	22 December 1983	SK9265462853; 53°09′17″N 0°36′57″W	1061955	Aubourn Hall More images
Church of All Saints	Beckingham	Parish Church	12th century	23 August 1967	SK8756553797; 53°04′27″N 0°41′40″W	1360525	Church of All Saints More images
Church of St Michael	Billinghay	Boiler House	C20	1 February 1967	TF1568154937; 53°04′45″N 0°16′28″W	1204770	Church of St Michael More images
Orchard Outbuilding at Somerton Castle	Boothby Graffoe	Tower	14th century	23 August 1967	SK9546058828; 53°07′05″N 0°34′30″W	1360511	Upload Photo
Somerton Castle and Outbuilding to North-west	Boothby Graffoe	Farmhouse	19th century	23 August 1967	SK9543158760; 53°07′03″N 0°34′32″W	1061974	Somerton Castle and Outbuilding to North-west More images
South-west Outbuilding at Somerton Castle	Boothby Graffoe	Tower	14th century	23 August 1967	SK9538558759; 53°07′03″N 0°34′35″W	1061975	Upload Photo
Church of St Helen	Brant Broughton, Brant Broughton and Stragglethorpe	Parish Church	11th century	23 August 1967	SK9154453899; 53°04′28″N 0°38′06″W	1147497	Church of St Helen More images
Church of St Michael	Stragglethorpe, Brant Broughton and Stragglethorpe	Parish Church	11th century	23 August 1967	SK9133752416; 53°03′40″N 0°38′19″W	1061900	Church of St Michael More images
Church of All Saints	Canwick	Parish Church	12th century	23 August 1967	SK9874569700; 53°12′55″N 0°31′22″W	1205100	Church of All Saints More images
Church of Saint Mary	Carlton-le-Moorland	Parish Church	11th century	23 August 1967	SK9080957895; 53°06′38″N 0°38′42″W	1360553	Church of Saint Mary More images
Church of All Saints	Coleby	Parish Church	Saxon	23 August 1967	SK9752060589; 53°08′01″N 0°32′38″W	1164829	Church of All Saints More images
The Temple at Coleby Hall	Coleby	Garden Temple	1762	19 November 1951	SK9750860936; 53°08′12″N 0°32′38″W	1360515	Upload Photo
Church of St Andrew	Cranwell, Cranwell and Byard's Leap	Parish Church	11th century	1 February 1967	TF0327749975; 53°02′14″N 0°27′40″W	1254166	Church of St Andrew More images
Culverthorpe Hall	Culverthorpe, Culverthorpe and Kelby	Country House	Late 17th century	23 November 1951	TF0201540374; 52°57′04″N 0°28′59″W	1061793	Culverthorpe Hall More images
Parish Church of St Andrew	Kelby, Culverthorpe and Kelby	Church	12th century	1 February 1967	TF0035941424; 52°57′39″N 0°30′27″W	1360583	Parish Church of St Andrew More images
Church of St Thomas a Becket	Digby	Parish Church	11th century	1 February 1967	TF0805054815; 53°04′47″N 0°23′18″W	1254176	Church of St Thomas a Becket More images
Church of St Peter	Doddington, Doddington and Whisby	Parish Church	13th century	23 August 1967	SK9007570123; 53°13′14″N 0°39′09″W	1061958	Church of St Peter More images
Doddington Hall	Doddington, Doddington and Whisby	Country House	1593-1600	22 December 1983	SK8999270083; 53°13′13″N 0°39′13″W	1164612	Doddington Hall More images
Church of St James and St John	Dorrington	Parish Church	13th century	1 February 1967	TF0762153375; 53°04′00″N 0°23′43″W	1254085	Church of St James and St John More images
Church of St Andrew	Ewerby, Ewerby and Evedon	Parish Church	12th century	1 February 1967	TF1216647278; 53°00′40″N 0°19′47″W	1360562	Church of St Andrew More images
Church of St John the Baptist	Great Hale	Parish Church	11th century	1 February 1967	TF1484142928; 52°58′17″N 0°17′29″W	1168767	Church of St John the Baptist More images
Church of St Andrew	Heckington	Parish Church	c. 1307	1 February 1967	TF1429344122; 52°58′56″N 0°17′57″W	1360590	Church of St Andrew More images
Heckington Mill	Heckington	Tower Mill	1830	23 November 1951	TF1456443537; 52°58′37″N 0°17′43″W	1168815	Heckington Mill More images
Church of St Andrew	Helpringham	Parish Church	c. 1200	1 February 1967	TF1387540750; 52°57′07″N 0°18′23″W	1168938	Church of St Andrew More images
Church of St Swithin	Leadenham	Parish Church	13th century	23 August 1967	SK9503851747; 53°03′16″N 0°35′01″W	1147388	Church of St Swithin More images
Church of St Andrew	Leasingham	Parish Church	Late 12th century	1 February 1967	TF0565948553; 53°01′26″N 0°25′34″W	1261413	Church of St Andrew More images
Church of St Peter	Navenby	Parish Church	13th century	23 August 1967	SK9865057843; 53°06′31″N 0°31′40″W	1147458	Church of St Peter More images
Former Parish Church of St Barbara	Haceby, Newton and Haceby	Church	12th century	1 February 1967	TF0302936068; 52°54′44″N 0°28′10″W	1147773	Former Parish Church of St Barbara More images
Parish Church of St Botolph	Newton, Newton and Haceby	Church	13th century	1 February 1967	TF0479236218; 52°54′47″N 0°26′35″W	1061795	Parish Church of St Botolph More images
Parish Church of St Peter	North Rauceby	Church	12th century	1 February 1967	TF0211646448; 53°00′20″N 0°28′47″W	1360606	Parish Church of St Peter More images
Church of All Saints	North Scarle	Church	12th century	23 August 1967	SK8482166737; 53°11′27″N 0°43′55″W	1062005	Church of All Saints More images
Church of Saint Peter	Norton Disney	Parish Church	13th century	23 August 1967	SK8899158953; 53°07′13″N 0°40′18″W	1360555	Church of Saint Peter More images
Parish Church of St Peter and Paul	Osbournby	Church	12th century	1 February 1967	TF0696038134; 52°55′48″N 0°24′37″W	1061760	Parish Church of St Peter and Paul More images
Church of St Clement	Rowston	Parish Church	12th century	1 February 1967	TF0840356406; 53°05′38″N 0°22′57″W	1064293	Church of St Clement More images
Church of All Saints	Ruskington	Parish Church	12th century	1 February 1967	TF0825851080; 53°02′46″N 0°23′12″W	1261375	Church of All Saints More images
Parish Church of St Denys	Silk Willoughby	Church	12th century	1 February 1967	TF0572643003; 52°58′26″N 0°25′37″W	1061769	Parish Church of St Denys More images
Parish Church of St Denys	Sleaford	Parish Church	c. 1180	16 July 1949	TF0688345893; 52°59′59″N 0°24′32″W	1062157	Parish Church of St Denys More images
Kyme Tower	South Kyme	Fortified House	Later than mid 14th century	23 November 1990	TF1685849622; 53°01′52″N 0°15′32″W	1204786	Kyme Tower More images
Church of St Michael	Swaton	Parish Church	12th century	1 February 1967	TF1330037521; 52°55′23″N 0°18′58″W	1061820	Church of St Michael More images
Church Tower to the North of Temple Farmhouse	Temple Bruer, Temple Bruer with Temple High Grange	Church	Early 13th century	1 February 1967	TF0085153709; 53°04′16″N 0°29′46″W	1254328	Church Tower to the North of Temple Farmhouse More images
Parish Church of St Peter	Threekingham	Church	1688	1 February 1967	TF0895436138; 52°54′42″N 0°22′52″W	1306911	Parish Church of St Peter More images
Church of St Nicholas	Walcot, Walcot near Folkingham	Church	12th century	1 February 1967	TF0600835163; 52°54′12″N 0°25′31″W	1360637	Church of St Nicholas More images
Cross in the Churchyard of the Church of St Nicholas	Walcot, Walcot near Folkingham	Cross/Sundial	14th century	11 January 1990	TF0600635133; 52°54′11″N 0°25′31″W	1061738	Upload Photo
Church of St Chad	Welbourn	Parish Church	12th century	23 August 1967	SK9686854510; 53°04′45″N 0°33′19″W	1061852	Church of St Chad More images
Church of All Saints	Wellingore	Parish Church	Late 12th century	23 August 1967	SK9822256538; 53°05′49″N 0°32′04″W	1308424	Church of All Saints More images
Church of St Mary	Wilsford	Church	11th century	1 February 1967	TF0065843023; 52°58′30″N 0°30′09″W	1360639	Church of St Mary More images
