= Oasby =

Hamlet in Lincolnshire, England

Coordinates: 52.942890°N 0.508484°W

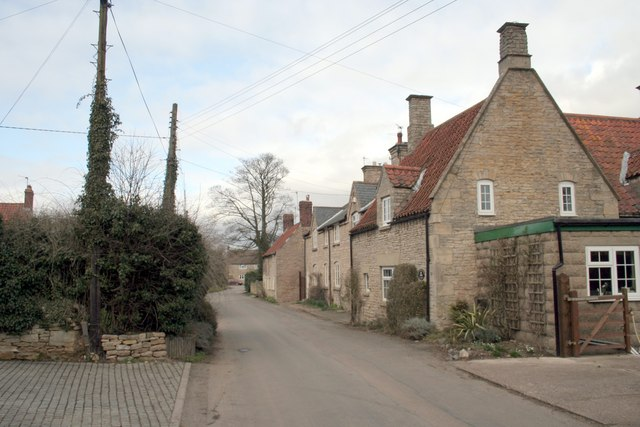
- Back Lane, Oasby

- Location within Lincolnshire
- OS grid reference: TF003394
  - London: 100 mi (160 km) S
- Civil parish: Heydour
- District: South Kesteven
- Shire county: Lincolnshire
- Region: East Midlands
- Country: England
- Sovereign state: United Kingdom
- Postcode district: NG32
- Police: Lincolnshire
- Fire: Lincolnshire
- Ambulance: East Midlands
- UK Parliament: Grantham and Bourne

Oasby is a hamlet in the civil parish of Heydour, in the South Kesteven district of Lincolnshire, England. It lies 7 miles (11 km) north-east of Grantham.

Oasby, Heydour, Aisby, Culverthorpe and Kelby are the five hamlets within Heydour parish.

Oasby Manor House is a Grade II* listed building dating from the 17th century with reused 15th-century stonework and 19th-century alterations. There is a 15th-century Oriel window on the first floor.

Manor House Farm is a 17th-century single story Grade II listed farmhouse.

Oasby Mill is a tower windmill, built about 1810 of black bitumen painted ashlar. It is Grade II listed, and all machinery has been removed.

The village public house, the Houblon Arms, was built about 1700 and is Grade II listed.

The parish holds community events, usually in Aisby village hall, with a book club, art club, cricket club, annual art exhibition and January pantomime.

Oasby

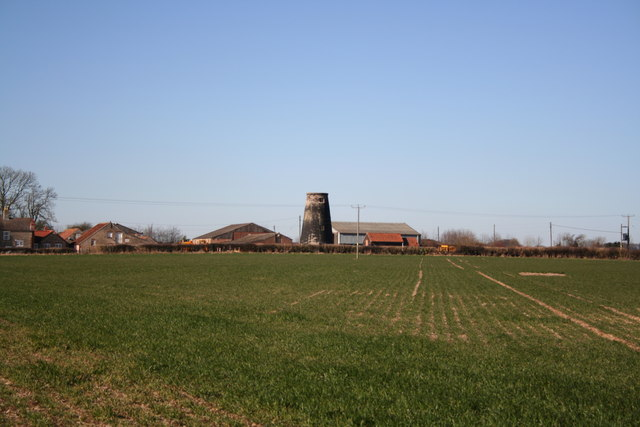
Oasby mill

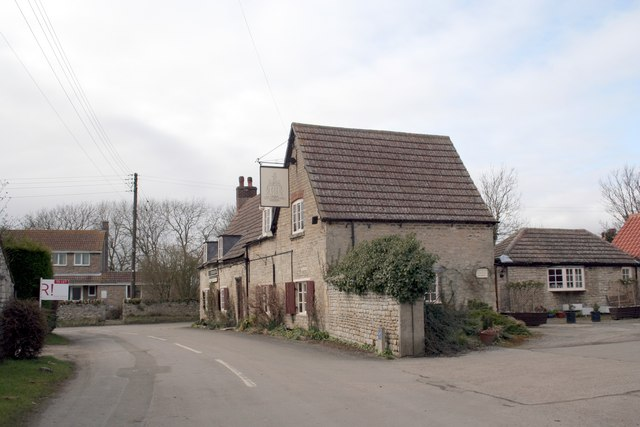
Houblon Arms
