= 1892 Kesteven County Council election =

1892 English local government election

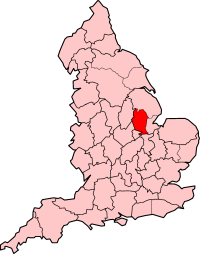
The administrative county of Kesteven (1889–1974), shown within England.

The second set of elections to Kesteven County Council were held on Thursday, 3 March 1892. Kesteven was one of three divisions of the historic county of Lincolnshire in England; it consisted of the ancient wapentakes (or hundreds) of Aswardhurn, Aveland, Beltisloe, Boothby Graffoe, Flaxwell, Langoe, Loveden, Ness, and Winnibriggs and Threo. The Local Government Act 1888 established Kesteven as an administrative county, governed by a Council; elections were held every three years from 1889, until it was abolished by the Local Government Act 1972, which established Lincolnshire County Council in its place.

Forty-six electoral divisions of the new Council were outlined in December 1888. For the 1892 election, Sleaford and Bourne, which were initially two member divisions, were split, the former into Quarrington and Sleaford, the latter into Bourne and Morton. Nearly every candidate was returned unopposed, with contests in only eight divisions.

== Results by division ==
=== Ancaster ===
Ancaster
Party	Candidate	Votes	%	±%
	W. Avery	NA	NA	

=== Barrowby ===
Barrowby
Party	Candidate	Votes	%	±%
	R. Welbourn	NA	NA	

=== Bassingham ===
Bassingham
Party	Candidate	Votes	%	±%
	C. C. Curtis	NA	NA	

=== Bennington ===
Bennington
Party	Candidate	Votes	%	±%
	W. Hutchinson	NA	NA	

=== Billingborough ===
Billingborough
Party	Candidate	Votes	%	±%
Conservative	E. Smith	266		
Conservative	E. J. Grummitt	148		

=== Billinghay ===
Billinghay
Party	Candidate	Votes	%	±%
	J. Creasey	NA	NA	

=== Bourne ===
Bourne and Morton
Party	Candidate	Votes	%	±%
Conservative	J. Measures	NA	NA	

=== Bracebridge ===
Bracebridge
Party	Candidate	Votes	%	±%
	W. J. Warrener	NA	NA	

=== Branston ===
Branston
Party	Candidate	Votes	%	±%
Liberal	W. S. Fox	206		
Conservative	H. Mackinder	150		

=== Bytham ===
Bytham
Party	Candidate	Votes	%	±%
	T. Williamson	NA	NA	

=== Caythorpe ===
Caythorpe
Party	Candidate	Votes	%	±%
	H. W. Chapman	NA	NA	

=== Claypole ===
Claypole
Party	Candidate	Votes	%	±%
Conservative	G. Nevile	NA	NA	

=== Colsterworth ===
Colsterworth
Party	Candidate	Votes	%	±%
Liberal	E. Crabtree	NA	NA	

=== Corby ===
Corby
Party	Candidate	Votes	%	±%
Conservative	Hon. G. H. D. Willoughby	235		
Liberal Unionist	C. Chapman	90		

=== Deeping ===
Deeping
Party	Candidate	Votes	%	±%
	W. Holland	NA	NA	

=== Gonerby ===
Gonerby
Party	Candidate	Votes	%	±%
	Thomas Newton	221		
	G. W. Harvey	123		

=== Grantham no. 1 ===
Grantham no. 1
Party	Candidate	Votes	%	±%
Liberal	J. Bailey	NA	NA	

=== Grantham no. 2 ===
Grantham no. 2
Party	Candidate	Votes	%	±%
Liberal	W. Scoffield	NA	NA	

=== Grantham no. 3 ===
Grantham no. 3
Party	Candidate	Votes	%	±%
Conservative	A. Hutchinson	NA	NA	

=== Grantham no. 4 ===
Grantham no. 4
Party	Candidate	Votes	%	±%
Liberal	E. S. Harding	NA	NA	

=== Grantham no. 5 ===
Grantham no. 5
Party	Candidate	Votes	%	±%
Liberal	W. L. Wand	187		
Conservative	R. S. Bestwick	111		

=== Grantham no. 6 ===
Grantham no. 6
Party	Candidate	Votes	%	±%
Conservative	J. W. Martin	NA	NA	

=== Grantham no. 7 ===
Grantham no. 7
Party	Candidate	Votes	%	±%
Conservative	W. B. Harrison	NA	NA	

=== Heckington ===
Heckington
Party	Candidate	Votes	%	±%
Conservative	F. Redshaw	NA	NA	

=== Heighington ===
Heighington
Party	Candidate	Votes	%	±%
Conservative	S. Oglesby	NA	NA	

=== Helpringham ===
Helpringham
Party	Candidate	Votes	%	±%
Conservative	J. S. Barber	NA	NA	

=== Kyme ===
Kyme
Party	Candidate	Votes	%	±%
Conservative	Lord Winchelsea			

=== Martin ===
Martin
Party	Candidate	Votes	%	±%
Conservative	J. H. Copping	NA	NA	

=== Metheringham ===
Metheringham
Party	Candidate	Votes	%	±%
Conservative	W. D. Gilpin-Brown	NA	NA	

=== Morton ===
Morton
Party	Candidate	Votes	%	±%
Conservative	Henry Goodyear	201		
Liberal	T. P. Allatt	170		

=== Navenby ===
Navenby
Party	Candidate	Votes	%	±%
Conservative	Major A. C. Tempest (ret.)	NA	NA	

=== Osbournby ===
Osbournby
Party	Candidate	Votes	%	±%
Conservative	W. H. Cragg	NA	NA	

=== Ponton ===
Ponton
Party	Candidate	Votes	%	±%
	R. C. Newton	NA	NA	

=== Quarrington ===
Quarrington
Party	Candidate	Votes	%	±%
Liberal Unionist	A. L. Jessopp	NA	NA	

=== Rippingale ===
Rippingale
Party	Candidate	Votes	%	±%
Liberal	W. Bacon	NA	NA	

=== Ropsley ===
Ropsley
Party	Candidate	Votes	%	±%
Conservative	C. Thorold	NA	NA	

=== Ruskington ===
Ruskington
Party	Candidate	Votes	%	±%
Conservative	N. H. Reeve	NA	NA	

=== Skellingthorpe ===
Skillingthorpe
Party	Candidate	Votes	%	±%
Conservative	G. E. Jarvis	NA	NA	

=== Sleaford ===
Sleaford
Party	Candidate	Votes	%	±%
Conservative	T. E. Jacobson	221		
Labour	W. B. Harris	152		

=== Stamford no. 1 ===
Stamford no. 1
Party	Candidate	Votes	%	±%
Liberal	C. Chapman	NA	NA	

=== Stamford no. 2 ===
Stamford no. 2
Party	Candidate	Votes	%	±%
Liberal	J. S. Loweth	NA	NA	

=== Stamford no. 3 ===
Stamford np. 3
Party	Candidate	Votes	%	±%
Conservative	H. Hart	NA	NA	

=== Stamford no. 4 ===
Stamford no. 4
Party	Candidate	Votes	%	±%
Conservative	C. Handson	NA	NA	

=== Thurlby ===
Thurlby
Party	Candidate	Votes	%	±%
Liberal	Robert Peasgood	213		
Conservative	W. Cross	169		

=== Uffington ===
Uffington
Party	Candidate	Votes	%	±%
Conservative	The Lord Bertie	NA	NA	

=== Waddington ===
Waddington
Party	Candidate	Votes	%	±%
Conservative	Colonel R. G. Ellison	NA	NA	

=== Wellingore ===
Wellingore
Party	Candidate	Votes	%	±%
Conservative	Colonel J. Reeve	NA	NA	

=== Wilsford ===
Wilsford
Party	Candidate	Votes	%	±%
Conservative	G. H. Peake	NA	NA	
