= 1898 Kesteven County Council election =

1898 English local government election

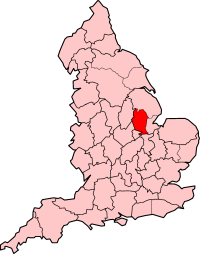
The administrative county of Kesteven (1889–1974), shown within England.

The fourth set of elections to Kesteven County Council were held in March 1898. Kesteven was one of three divisions of the historic county of Lincolnshire in England; it consisted of the ancient wapentakes (or hundreds) of Aswardhurn, Aveland, Beltisloe, Boothby Graffoe, Flaxwell, Langoe, Loveden, Ness, and Winnibriggs and Threo. The Local Government Act 1888 established Kesteven as an administrative county, governed by a Council; elections were held every three years from 1889, until it was abolished by the Local Government Act 1972, which established Lincolnshire County Council in its place.

Forty-eight electoral divisions of the new Council were outlined in December 1888. Nearly every candidate was returned unopposed, with contests in only three divisions.

== Results by division ==
=== Ancaster ===
Ancaster
Party	Candidate	Votes	%	±%
Conservative	William Avery	NA	NA	

=== Barrowby ===
Barrowby
Party	Candidate	Votes	%	±%
Conservative	Charles G. E. Welby JP	NA	NA	

=== Bassingham ===
Bassingham
Party	Candidate	Votes	%	±%
Conservative	Charles C. Curtis	NA	NA	

=== Bennington ===
Bennington
Party	Candidate	Votes	%	±%
Conservative	William Hutchinson	NA	NA	

=== Billingborough ===
Billingborough
Party	Candidate	Votes	%	±%
Conservative	Edward Smith	NA	NA	

=== Billinghay ===
Billinghay
Party	Candidate	Votes	%	±%
Conservative	John Creasey	NA	NA	

=== Bourne and Morton ===
Bourne and Morton
Party	Candidate	Votes	%	±%
Conservative	James Measures			

=== Bracebridge ===
Bracebridge
Party	Candidate	Votes	%	±%
Conservative	Hugh Jackson	NA	NA	

=== Branston ===
Branston
Party	Candidate	Votes	%	±%
Liberal	W. S. Fox	NA	NA	

=== Bytham ===
Bytham
Party	Candidate	Votes	%	±%
Conservative	Thomas Williamson	NA	NA	

=== Caythorpe ===
Caythorpe
Party	Candidate	Votes	%	±%
	William Oxley	NA	NA	

=== Claypole ===
Claypole
Party	Candidate	Votes	%	±%
Conservative	George Nevile	NA	NA	

=== Colsterworth ===
Colsterworth
Party	Candidate	Votes	%	±%
Liberal	Eli Crabtree	NA	NA	

=== Corby ===
Corby
Party	Candidate	Votes	%	±%
Conservative	Conyers Chapman	218		
Conservative	Henry Minta	81		
Turnout		299		

=== Deeping ===
Deeping
Party	Candidate	Votes	%	±%
Conservative	William Holland	NA	NA	

=== Grantham no. 1 ===
Grantham no. 1
Party	Candidate	Votes	%	±%
	William Bailey	NA	NA	

=== Grantham no. 2 ===
Grantham no. 2
Party	Candidate	Votes	%	±%
	James Perkins Coultas	NA	NA	

=== Grantham no. 3 ===
Grantham no. 3
Party	Candidate	Votes	%	±%
	Arthur Hutchinson	NA	NA	

=== Grantham no. 4 ===
Grantham no. 4
Party	Candidate	Votes	%	±%
	Rev. George Benson Bowler	NA		

=== Grantham no. 5 ===
Grantham no. 5
Party	Candidate	Votes	%	±%
	William Long Wand	NA	NA	

=== Grantham no. 6 ===
Grantham no. 6
Party	Candidate	Votes	%	±%
	John William Martin	NA	NA	

=== Grantham no. 7 ===
Grantham no. 7
Party	Candidate	Votes	%	±%
	Joshua Lincoln	NA	NA	

=== Great Gonerby ===
Gonerby
Party	Candidate	Votes	%	±%
Conservative	Thomas Newton	NA	NA	

=== Heckington ===
Heckington
Party	Candidate	Votes	%	±%
Liberal	Daniel G. Harris	NA	NA	

=== Heighington ===
Heckington
Party	Candidate	Votes	%	±%
Conservative	Samuel Oglesby	NA	NA	

=== Helpringham ===
Helpringham
Party	Candidate	Votes	%	±%
Conservative	James S. Barber	NA	NA	

=== Kyme ===
Kyme
Party	Candidate	Votes	%	±%
Conservative	The Earl of Winchelsea	NA	NA	

=== Martin ===
Martin
Party	Candidate	Votes	%	±%
Conservative	John H. Copping	NA	NA	

=== Metheringham ===
Metheringham
Party	Candidate	Votes	%	±%
Conservative	E. G. Allen	NA	NA	

=== Morton ===
Morton
Party	Candidate	Votes	%	±%
Liberal	John T. Swift	NA	NA	

=== Navenby ===
Navenby
Party	Candidate	Votes	%	±%
Conservative	Andrew Campbell	NA	NA	

=== Osbournby ===
Osbournby
Party	Candidate	Votes	%	±%
Conservative	William A. Cragg	NA	NA	

=== Ponton ===
Ponton
Party	Candidate	Votes	%	±%
Conservative	Robert C. Newton	NA	NA	

=== Rippingale ===
Rippingale
Party	Candidate	Votes	%	±%
Conservative	Arthur Wellesley Dean	214		
Liberal	William Bacon	153		
Turnout		367		

=== Ropsley ===
Ropsley
Party	Candidate	Votes	%	±%
Conservative	J. Cecil Rudkin	NA	NA	

=== Ruskington ===
Ruskington
Party	Candidate	Votes	%	±%
Conservative	Samuel F. Pattinson	NA	NA	

=== Skellingthorpe ===
Skellingthorpe
Party	Candidate	Votes	%	±%
Conservative	Captain George E. Jarvis	NA	NA	

=== Sleaford East ===
Sleaford East
Party	Candidate	Votes	%	±%
Conservative	John Nickolls (Note: He died aged 75 on 3 February 1901, shortly before the next election.)	NA	NA	

=== Sleaford West ===
Sleaford West
Party	Candidate	Votes	%	±%
Liberal	William B. Harris	NA	NA	

=== Stamford All Saints ===
Stamford All Saints
Party	Candidate	Votes	%	±%
	Charles Chapman	268		
	J. Woolston	239		
Turnout		507		

=== Stamford St George's ===
Stamford St George's
Party	Candidate	Votes	%	±%
	J. S. Loweth	NA	NA	

=== Stamford St Michael's and St John's ===
Stamford St Michael's and St John's
Party	Candidate	Votes	%	±%
	Major Hart	NA	NA	

=== Stamford St Martin's and St Mary's ===
Stamford St Martin's and St Mary's
Party	Candidate	Votes	%	±%
	G. Higgs	NA	NA	

=== Thurlby ===
Thurlby
Party	Candidate	Votes	%	±%
Liberal	Robert Peasgood	NA	NA	

=== Uffington ===
Uffington
Party	Candidate	Votes	%	±%
Conservative	The Lord Kesteven	NA	NA	

=== Waddington ===
Waddington
Party	Candidate	Votes	%	±%
Conservative	Colonel R. G. Ellison	NA	NA	

=== Wellingore ===
Wellingore
Party	Candidate	Votes	%	±%
Conservative	Robert N. Moreley	NA	NA	

=== Wilsford ===
Wilsford
Party	Candidate	Votes	%	±%
	Richard M. Cole	NA	NA	
