= Aveland =

Ancient subdivision of Lincolnshire, England

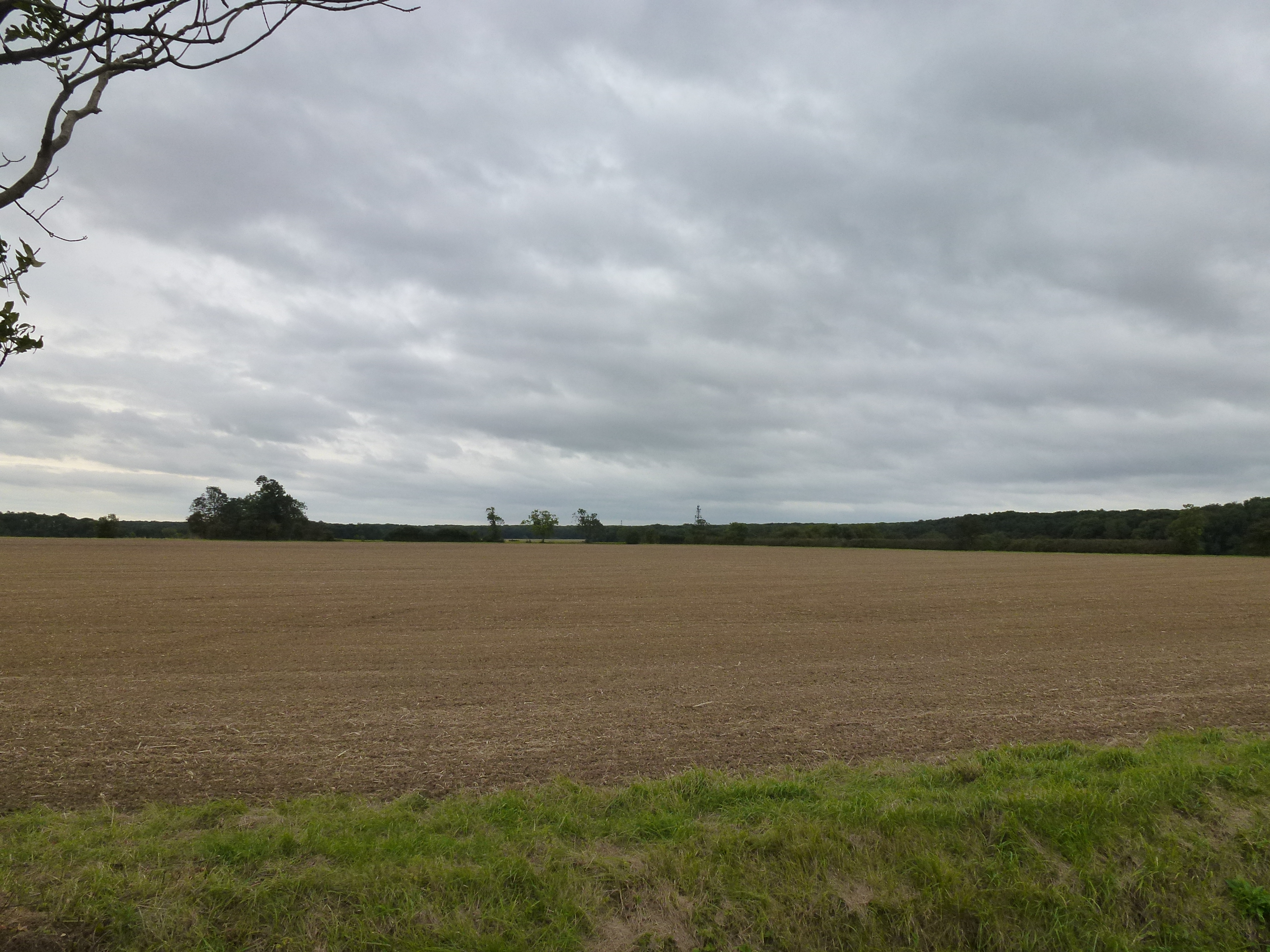
- Aveland Moot; There was once a moat in this field, now only visible on crop marks. It is thought to have been the meeting-place of the Aveland Wapentake.

- Location in Lincolnshire
- 52.85°N 0.416°W
- Type: Wapentake
- Location: Lincolnshire, England

Aveland was a Wapentake of Kesteven from the time of the Danelaw until the Local Government Act 1888. Its meeting place was The Aveland at grid reference TF 0675 2961 in the parish of Aslackby.

== Origins ==
Aveland was probably established as an administrative unit soon after 921 when Edward the Elder ably assisted until 918, by Æthelflæd had restored English rule in the part of the Danelaw represented by Kesteven.

The wapentake included the ancient parishes of Aslackby, Billingborough, Birthorpe, Bourne, Dembleby, Dowsby, Dunsby, Folkingham, Haconby, Haceby, Horbling, Kirkby Underwood, Laughton, Morton, Newton, Osbournby, Pickworth, Pointon, Rippingale, Sempringham, Spanby, Swaton, Threekingham and Walcot; some of which have since been amalgamated.

There is documentary evidence from the Domesday survey onwards for a settlement called Avethorpe in the parish of Aslackby but no actual location is known.

== Decline ==
Between 921 and 1888, the administrative significance of the wapentake was reduced by many small steps. The first was as a result of the invasion of England by Swein in 1013. The Kesteven people supported it so that, when order was restored, the shire of Lincoln was set up and given powers over the wapentakes. Subsequently, piecemeal, privileges were given to lords of the manors in Aveland so that it became progressively less significant. By 1250, there was little power left.

== Modern usage ==
- The name Aveland is retained as that of an electoral ward in South Kesteven administrative district
- It was also the name of a school in Billingborough from 1963 to 2012
- The Aveland History Group is a local community history group that covers the area of the ancient Wapentake https://www.theavelandhistorygroup.com/
- In the Diocese of Lincoln, there is an Aveland and Ness with Stamford Deanery
- Lincoln Hall, a residence at the University of Nottingham, has a house named Aveland.
