= Heydour =

Hamlet in South Kesteven district of Lincolnshire, England

Coordinates: 52.944°N 0.499°W

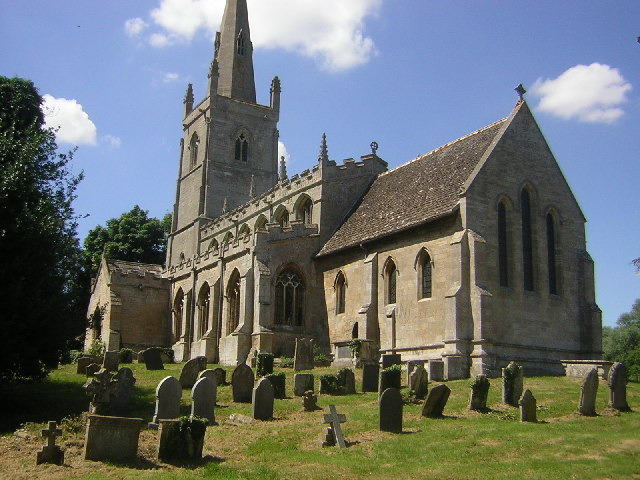
- St Michael's parish church, Heydour

- Location within Lincolnshire
- Population: 286 (2001 census)
- OS grid reference: TF009395
  - London: 100 mi (160 km) S
- District: South Kesteven
- Shire county: Lincolnshire
- Region: East Midlands
- Country: England
- Sovereign state: United Kingdom
- Post town: Grantham
- Postcode district: NG32
- Police: Lincolnshire
- Fire: Lincolnshire
- Ambulance: East Midlands
- UK Parliament: Grantham and Bourne

Heydour is a hamlet and civil parish in the South Kesteven district of Lincolnshire, England. The parish population of 286 at the 2001 census rose to 311 at the 2011 census. Heydour lies about 5 miles (8 km) south-west of Sleaford and 6 miles (10 km) north-east of Grantham. It forms a group of parish hamlets with Kelby, Culverthorpe, Oasby and Aisby.

== History ==
The 1086 Domesday Book records it as "Haidure" and "Heidure", with 80 acres (32 ha) of meadow and 16 acres (6.5 ha) of woodland within the manor of Osbournby. Before the Norman Conquest of England it was held by Aelfric, son of Godram, and after 1086, by Vitalis.

Particularly around the south of the village there are earthwork signs of houses, crofts, quarries and ridge and furrow field systems from earlier medieval settlement. The village belonged to the historical wapentake of Winnibriggs and Threo.

In 1885 the township covered 3,140 acres (12.7 km^{2}) with a population in 1881 of 363. The 5,140 acres (20.8 km^{2}) parish, including Kelby and Culverthorpe has 447 inhabitants. There existed in Heydour from the 14th century freestone quarries that provided the first stones for Belton House.

Kelly's Directory states: "In a field west of the church are traces of a large mansion or castle, supposed to have been built in reign of Stephen by one of the Bussey family, who were seated here until about 1609." The Busseys were major landowners and a branch of the same family as at Hougham. When the son of John Bussey (c. 1533–1593), Sir Edmund Bussey (1562–1616), took over the manor house, it was dilapidated and required rebuilding and its land reorganising. The castle or manor house was socially and physically integrated into the manor and parish of Heydour, unlike other areas of Lincolnshire. The existence of a castle is shown by remnants of masonry, foundations and ditch, and form a listed monument.

The village had a school, which closed in 1983.

== Community ==
The hamlet of Oasby has been classed as a conservation area, while dwellings in Heydour parish are listed by the local authority as "of interest".

The parish hamlets cooperate on events such as an annual art exhibition, a fête and scarecrow competition, and groups of Mummers, musicians and Morris dancers. An annual pantomime is held in Aisby village hall. The parish church holds a carol concert on the Sunday before Christmas. The Houblon Arms at Oasby is the local pub-restaurant. The nearest shop/post office is in Wilsford, 2 miles (3 km) to the north.

== Landmarks ==
=== Church ===
Heydour Grade I listed Anglican parish church, is dedicated to St Michael and All Angels. The church dates from the 12th century, with additions up to the 19th. There is a 12th-century canonical sundial on the south wall. The church has an Early English chancel with lancet windows and a 17th-century north funerary chapel, and a nave with a Perpendicular clerestory, including six tracery panelled windows. It has Decorated north and south aisles with evidence at the roof line of earlier aisles, four arcades, a south porch, and a Decorated west tower with pinnacles, crenellations, and a Perpendicular recessed spire.

The church was probably gifted by Geoffrey de Saxe, prebendary of Heydour from 1325 to 1380, to whom the chancel holds a tomb and a sedilia. The post-1342 roof above the north aisle was built from donations by Lord Scrope of Masham (1312–1391).

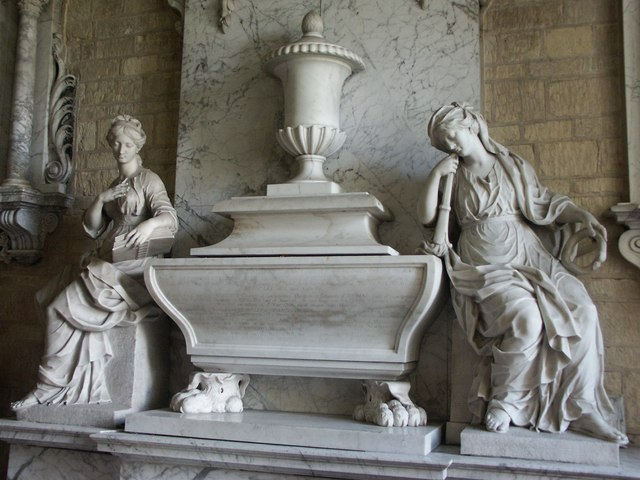
Monument, St Michael's

A main feature is stained glass in the north aisle dating from about 1380. One window, showing figures of Edward the Confessor, St George and St Edmund, was erected from donations from Deacon Geoffrey Scrope and Beatrice Luttrell. Another window depicts St Vincent, St Laurence and St Stephen. A third is from the 19th century and by William Wailes. Pevsner notes windows from 1899 by Kempe in the east, north and south chancel. Further features are a priest's doorway with cinque-cusped head, octagonal font, a chest from 1530 to 1550, an ornamental painting in the chancel, and chalice and flagon by George Wickes from 1727.

Inside there are monuments to the Newton family of Culverthorpe Hall, including Abigail Newton, died 1686, as well as Sir John Newton, died 1734, and Margaret, Countess of Coningsby (Sir Michaels daughter-in-law), died 1761, both attributed to Rysbrack, Lady Newton, died 1737, and Sir Michael Newton, died 1746, both by Scheemakers. There is a marble slab to the last male Newton heir, who died on 14 January 1723. The infant son of Sir Michael Newton and Margaret, Countess of Coningsby, he was taken from his cradle in the absence of his nurse by a pet monkey, which was pursued onto the roof of Culverthorpe Hall. It dropped the child over a parapet and he was killed by the fall. Signatures on the church bells commemorate Sir Edmund Bussey and his son Miles Bussey (born 1590 or 1592). They include the arms of Sir Edmund and his wife Francis.

=== Other listed buildings ===
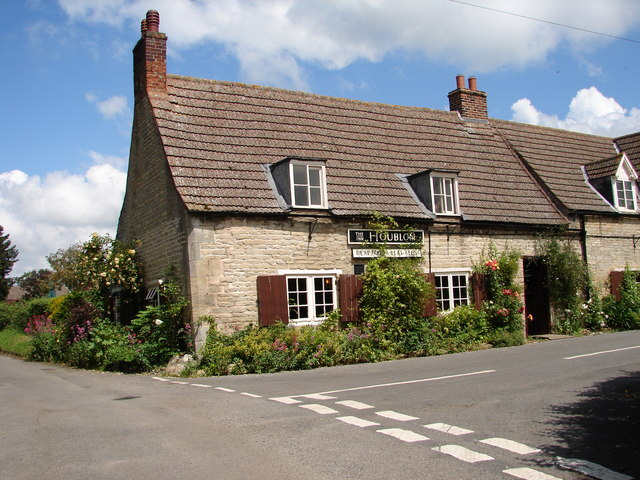
Houblon Arms, Oasby

- The Houblon Arms, Main Street, Oasby, is a pub dating from the 17th century.
- Church Lees Farmhouse (c. 1700 with 1800 additions) is possibly a former rectory, now a classic farmhouse, with a niche above the front door, in which is set a 14th-century stone figure of a young musician with cymbals, said to be from the castle, which stood west of the house.
- Heydour House was formerly a rectory, built in 1857 to the plans of William White and in 1885 attached to the chapelries of Kelby and Culverthorpe.
- Heydour Priory, Main Street, Heydour, is a late 16th-century ancestral home of the Dymoke family.
- Oasby Mill is a tower mill built in 1810.
- Oasby Manor House is from the 17th-century.
- Oasby House is another 17th-century house.
- Manor House Farmhouse dates from about 1700.
- Folly Cottage is from the 17th-century.
