= Walcot, Lincolnshire =

Village and civil parish in the North Kesteven district of Lincolnshire, England

Coordinates: 52.903104°N 0.423928°W

Walcot
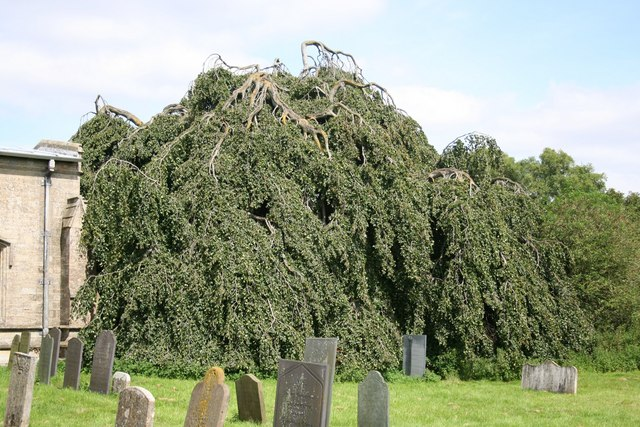
- Weeping beech over St Nicholas's Church, Walcot

- Location within Lincolnshire
- OS grid reference: TF061351
  - London: 95 mi (153 km) S
- District: North Kesteven
- Shire county: Lincolnshire
- Region: East Midlands
- Country: England
- Sovereign state: United Kingdom
- Post town: SLEAFORD
- Postcode district: NG34
- Police: Lincolnshire
- Fire: Lincolnshire
- Ambulance: East Midlands
- UK Parliament: Sleaford and North Hykeham

Walcot is a village and civil parish in the North Kesteven district of Lincolnshire, England. It lies 1 mile (1.6 km) west from the A15, 7 miles (11 km) south from Sleaford, 9 miles (14 km) east from Grantham, and 1 mile north from Folkingham. The population is included in the civil parish of Newton and Haceby.

== History ==
According to A Dictionary of British Place Names, Walcot is derived from the Old English 'walh' with 'cot', which means "cottage(s) of the Britons".

Walcot is a probable site of prehistoric or Roman settlement. Earthworks indicating rectilinear ditched enclosures and a circular dwelling have been found, evidenced through crop marks and aerial photographs. Medieval ridge and furrow field systems have also been recorded.

In the Domesday Book of 1086 the village is written as "Walecote". In 1086 it consisted of 6 villagers, 14 freemen and 5 smallholders, land for 6 plough teams, a 30 acres (0.12 km^{2}) meadow and a church. In 1066 lordship of the manor was held by the Abbey of St Peter, Peterborough, being transferred to Gilbert de Ghent in 1086.

Marrat, in his History of Lincolnshire (1816), notes the village as being in the wapentake of Aveland. He mentions the existence of two Elizabethan manor houses, one to the west of the church, belonging to Sir Gilbert Heathcote, the other to the south-east of the church, to Edward Brown. Both Heathcote and Brown were Lord of the manor and principal landowners.

Walcot is recorded in the 1872 White's Directory as a "pleasant village" northwest of "Falkingham" (Folkingham), and 4 miles (6 km) from Billingborough railway station. The parish contained 193 people within 1,474 acres (6 km^{2}) of land. Sir William Heathcote, 5th Baronet, was lord of the manor, and also impropriator of ecclesiastical parish tithes—receiving (typically) one-tenth of the produce or profits of the land—and patron of the incumbent's vicarage, which was held by the vicar of Folkingham, who was supported by glebe—an area of land used to support a parish priest—of 52 acres (0.2 km^{2}) at Quadring, 35 acres (0.1 km^{2}) at Mareham le Fen and 32 acres (0.1 km^{2}) at Spanby. Close to the village was a chalybeate spring, White's stating that it was "formally noted for medicinal virtues, but it lost its reputation many years ago". The poor of the parish received coal at Christmas, paid for by a yearly £14 rental from just over 3 acres (10,000 m^{2}) of land at Walcot, and 1 acre (4,000 m^{2}) at Spanby; a further 10 shillings yearly came from land rent at Newton. Parish professions and trades listed included the parish vicar, the parish clerk, a schoolmistress of the infants' school, the landlord of the Black Horse public house, a toll keeper, a dressmaker, two tailors, one of whom was also a draper, a shopkeeper, a carpenter, a blacksmith, five farmers, two of whom were also graziers, and a carrier—transporter of goods and occasionally people between centres of trade—operating between the village and both Bourne and Sleaford.

In 1885 Kelly's Directory noted that the village contained "springs of very pure water… one strongly chalybeate". Agricultural production in a parish of 1,747 acres (7.07 km^{2}) was chiefly wheat, barley and oats. Parish population in 1881 was 149. Lord of the manor and principal landowner was Lord Aveland PC, DL, JP.

== Landmarks ==
Walcot Grade I listed Anglican church is dedicated to St Nicholas. It dates from the 12th century, with additions and adaptations up to the 18th century, and restorations in 1899, 1907 and 1926. The architectural style is mainly Decorated, the interior being of an earlier, Early English date. It consists of a Perpendicular clerestory, a nave, aisles, and a tower with crocketed broached spire containing 4 bells. In the aisle to the south is a canopied niche with buttresses and pinnacles. In the chancel is a piscina and a priest's door. Pevsner notes a 17th-century south entrance panelled door incorporating a wicket gate, and the existence of an 1809 paten by William Fountain. Marrat describes two monumental brasses, to Isaac Lavington (d.1635) and John Lavington (d.1637), in the floor of the north aisle, and gives the patron of St Nicholas's as Sir Gilbert Heathcote. Within the churchyard is a Grade I listed shaft of a 14th-century cross with a later added sundial.

Other listed buildings in Walcot are The Grange and Laurel Farm, both late 17th-century and on Main Street, and a barn at Manor Farm.

== Civil parish ==
Although the village is in the civil parish of Walcott near Folkingham local democracy is handled together with the adjacent villages of Newton and Haceby in the Newton, Haceby and Walcot Parish Meeting.
