= Aisby, South Kesteven =

Village in Lincolnshire, England

Coordinates: 52.937426°N 0.496618°W

Aisby
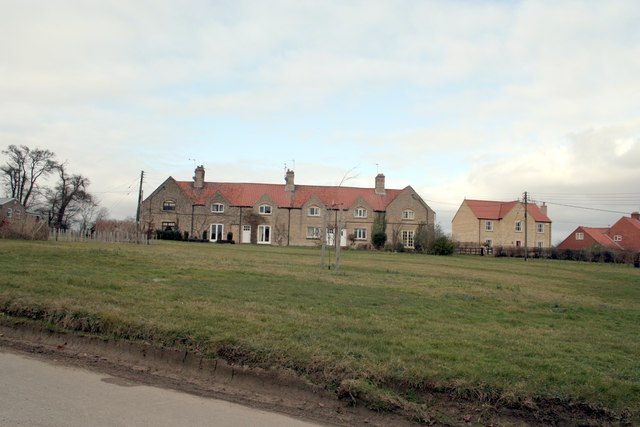
- Village green, Aisby

- Location within Lincolnshire
- OS grid reference: TF011388
  - London: 100 mi (160 km) S
- Civil parish: Heydour
- District: South Kesteven
- Shire county: Lincolnshire
- Region: East Midlands
- Country: England
- Sovereign state: United Kingdom
- Post town: Grantham
- Postcode district: NG32
- Dialling code: 01400
- Police: Lincolnshire
- Fire: Lincolnshire
- Ambulance: East Midlands
- UK Parliament: Grantham and Bourne

Aisby is a village in the civil parish of Heydour, in the South Kesteven district of Lincolnshire, England. It is situated 1 mile (1.6 km) north from the A52 road and 6 miles (10 km) north-east from Grantham.

Aisby is written in the Domesday Book as "Asebi".

Once a small hamlet belonging to the nearby Culverthorpe Estate, the village was sold off in lots in 1918 and is now expanded with additional building of housing since 1990. Aisby has other spellings in official records, including censuses, such as "Azeby" or "Hazeby".
