= Kirkby Underwood =

Village and civil parish in the South Kesteven district of Lincolnshire, England

Coordinates: 52.833°N 0.408°W

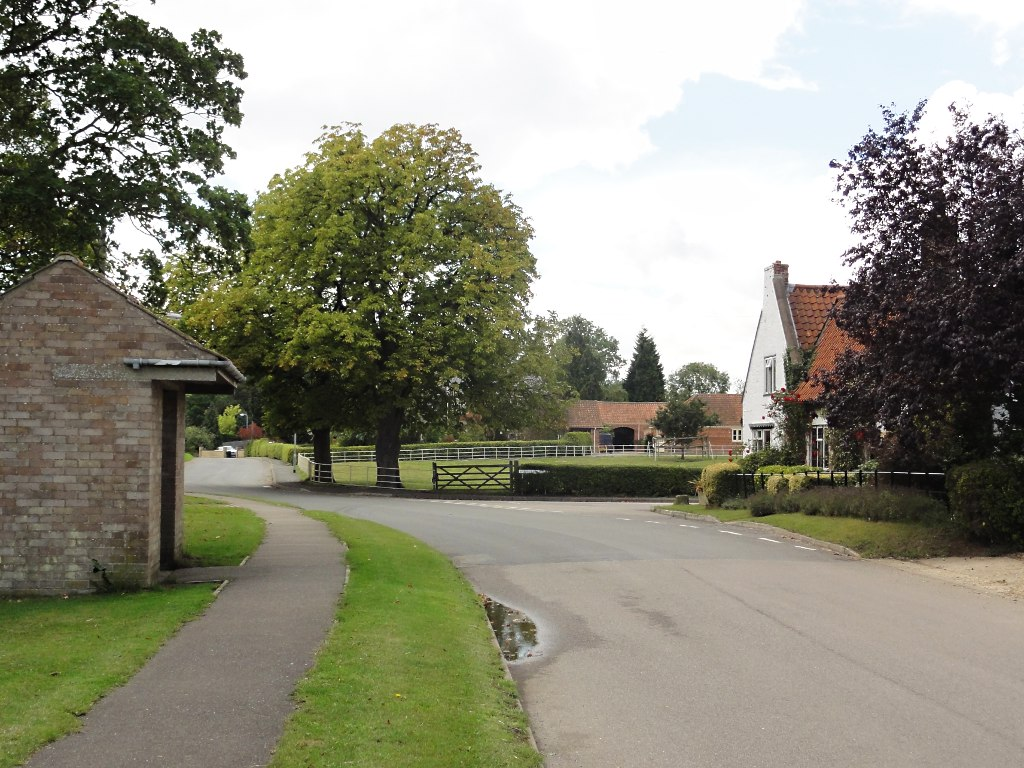
- The road junctions in Kirkby Underwood

- Location within Lincolnshire
- Population: 200
- OS grid reference: TF097240
  - London: 90 mi (140 km) S
- District: South Kesteven
- Shire county: Lincolnshire
- Region: East Midlands
- Country: England
- Sovereign state: United Kingdom
- Post town: BOURNE
- Postcode district: PE10
- Police: Lincolnshire
- Fire: Lincolnshire
- Ambulance: East Midlands

Kirkby Underwood is a village and civil parish in the South Kesteven district of Lincolnshire, England. The population of the civil parish was 200 at the 2001 census, increasing to 220 at the 2011 census. It is situated 4 miles (6 km) north from Bourne and 1 mile (1.6 km) west from the main A15 trunk road. To the east is Rippingale and the Fens. Directly to the south is the hamlet of Stainfield, and to the west, Hawthorpe.

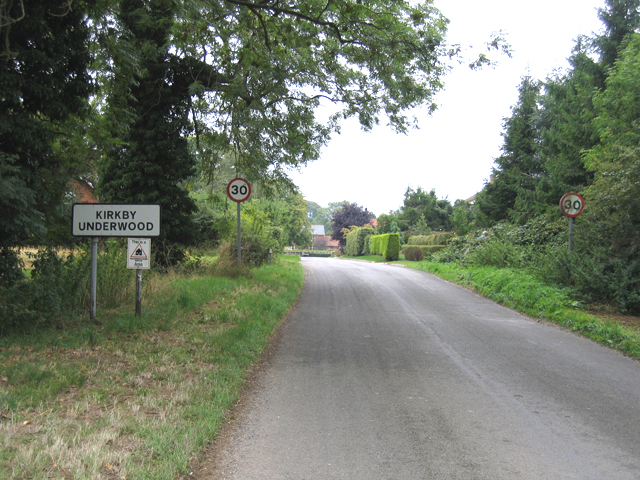
Kirkby Underwood

== Geography ==
Between the village and Hawthorpe is Callan's Lane Wood, run by the Forestry Commission. Near the wood are two radio masts and a BT microwave transmitter.

== History ==
Kirkby Underwood Grade I listed Anglican church is dedicated to St. Mary and All Saints. In 1885 Kelly's Directory described the church as in Perpendicular style, with chancel, nave and south aisle, and a tower containing three bells. It was in a "very ruinous state". The parish register dated from 1569.

The ecclesiastical parish is part of The Ringstone in Aveland Group of the Deanery of Beltisloe, Diocese of Lincoln. The vicar was the Revd Dr Lynda Pugh between 2012 and 2018. The incumbent is the Revd Neil Bullen.

=== 1951 air crash ===
24 year old James Renton, of 7FTS at RAF Cottesmore crashed on 30 May 1951, in Percival Prentice VS290. He died in hospital on 31 May 1951. He was from 9 Rosemount in Bathgate.
