= Sir John Newton, 2nd Baronet =

English politician

Coat of arms of the Newton family of Great Gonerby, Lincolnshire.

Sir John Newton, 2nd Baronet (9 June 1626 – 31 May 1699) was an English politician who sat in the House of Commons from 1660 to 1685.

Newton was the son of Thomas Newton of Gunwarley, Lincolnshire.

In 1660, Newton was elected Member of Parliament for Grantham in the Convention Parliament. In 1661 he inherited the baronetcy of Barrs Court on the death of Sir John Newton, 1st Baronet who died childless and had provision under the patent to bequeath his title and Culverthorpe Hall estate accordingly.

He was re-elected MP for Grantham in 1661 to the Cavalier Parliament and held the seat through subsequent parliaments to 1685.

Newton died at the age of 73. He had married Mary Eyre daughter of Sir Gervase Eyre of Rampton, Nottinghamshire. Their son John succeeded to the baronetcy and the Culverthorpe estate.

Baronetage of England
Preceded by John Newton	Baronet (of Barrs Court); 1660–1699	Succeeded by John Newton
