= Newton and Haceby =

Civil parish in Lincolnshire, England

Coordinates: 52.91°N 0.45°W

Newton and Haceby is a civil parish in North Kesteven, Lincolnshire, England. It includes the separate hamlets of Newton and Haceby. The population of the civil parish (including Walcot) at the 2011 census was 137.

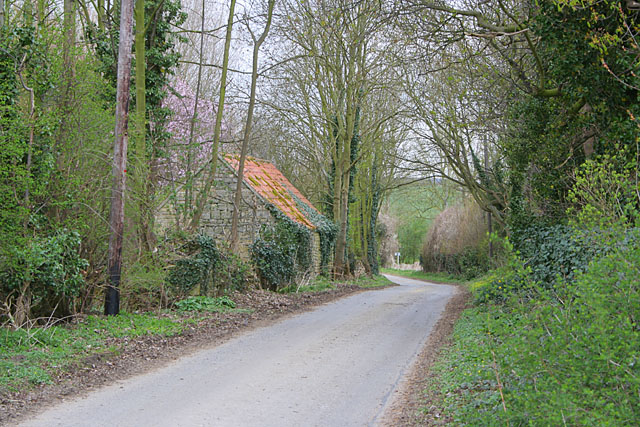
Leaving Haceby by the lane to the north

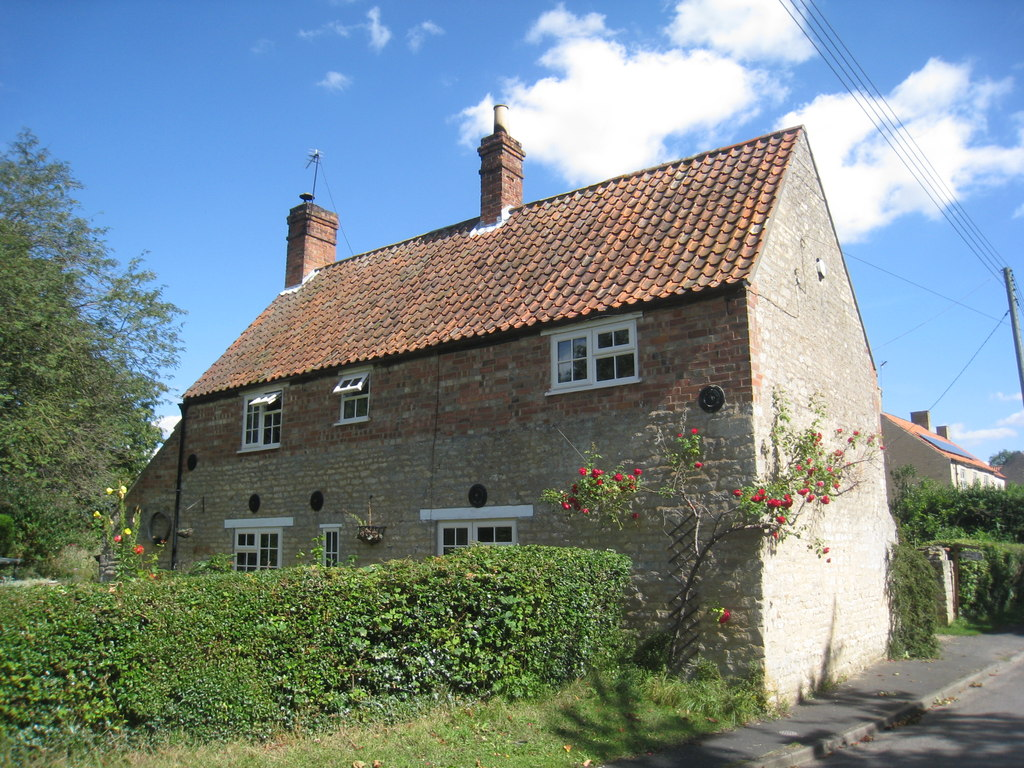
Cottage in Newton

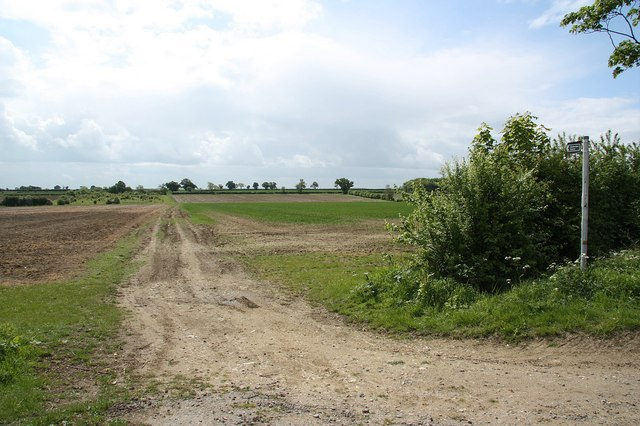
Green lane, Haceby

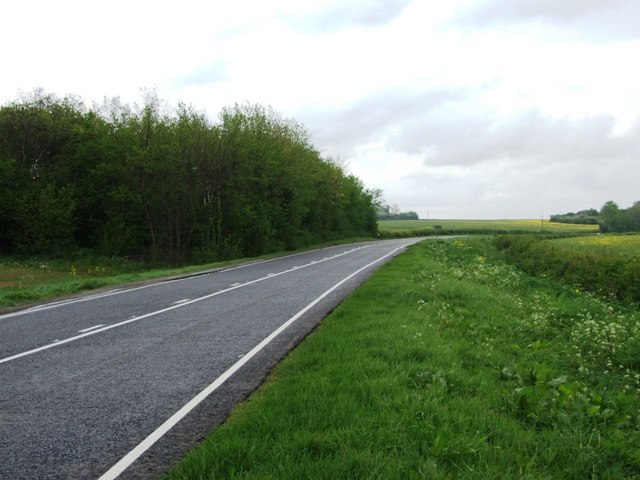
A52 near Haceby. The right hand side of the picture is in the parish

Local democracy is handled together with the adjacent parish of Walcot near Folkingham in the Newton, Haceby and Walcot Parish Meeting.

The parish is bounded on the north by the A52 Grantham to Boston road, and on the east by the A15 Bourne to Sleaford road. There are no major routes within the parish, only minor roads linking the farms and hamlets. Most of the parish is about 200 feet (61 m) above sea level, though a small stream lies in a narrow valley down to the road junction known as Newton Bar. A number of small woodlands are scattered through the parish, which is otherwise mostly open farmland.
