= Heckington Windmill =

Grade I listed windmill and historical landmark

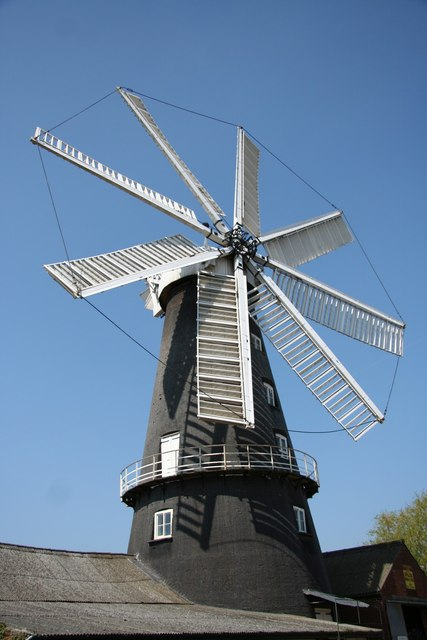
- The mill as preserved
- Interactive map of Heckington Windmill

Origin
- Mill name: Heckington Windmill; Pocklington's Mill, Heckington
- Grid reference: TF 146 436
- Coordinates: 52°58′37″N 0°17′43″W
- Operator: Heckington Mill Trust
- Year built: 1830

Information
- Purpose: Corn mill and sawmill
- Type: Tower mill
- No. of sails: Eight sails
- Type of sails: Patent sails
- Windshaft: Cast iron
- Winding: Fantail
- Fantail blades: Eight blades
- No. of pairs of millstones: Four pairs
- Type of saw: Circular saw

Heckington Windmill is the only eight-sailed tower windmill still standing in the United Kingdom with its sails intact.

Heckington is located between Sleaford and Boston in Lincolnshire, England. The mill stands very close to Heckington railway station, hence its name of the 'Station Mill' in the 19th century. The windmill is designated a Grade I listed building.

== Construction ==
It was built in 1830 for Michael Hare to plans by millwright Edward Ingledew who also built, among others, Wragby tower mill in 1831, Waltham Windmill in 1837, and the former Pickworth tower mill. The tower is of red brick, the outer walls being tarred (provided with a black bitumen paint in order to keep moisture out). It was built as a five-sailed windmill (similar to Alford Windmill) with Sutton's single patent sails (15 feet tip-width and 12 feet heel-width) providing longitudinal shutters on both sides of the backs (36 feet in length). The mill has six storeys called "floors": ground floor, meal floor, stone (stage) floor, lower bin floor, upper bin floor (hoist floor), dust or cap floor.

== History ==
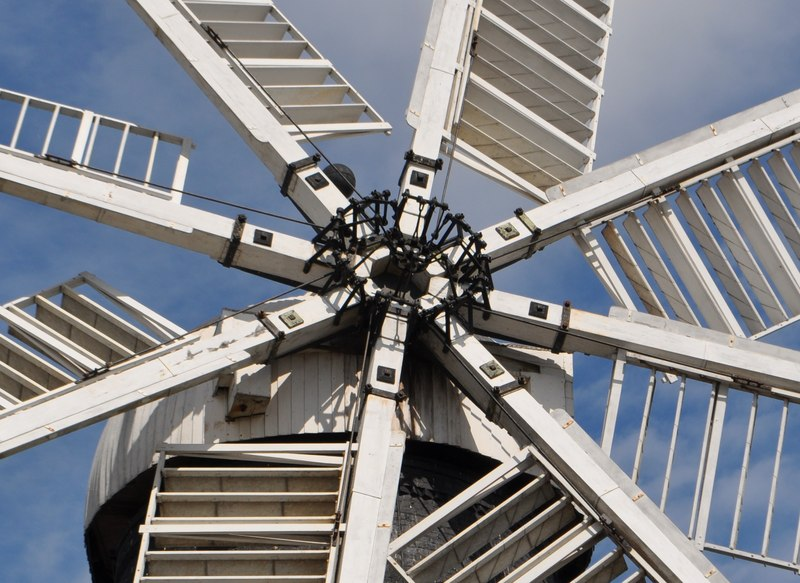
Last existing eight-sailed tower windmill in Heckington

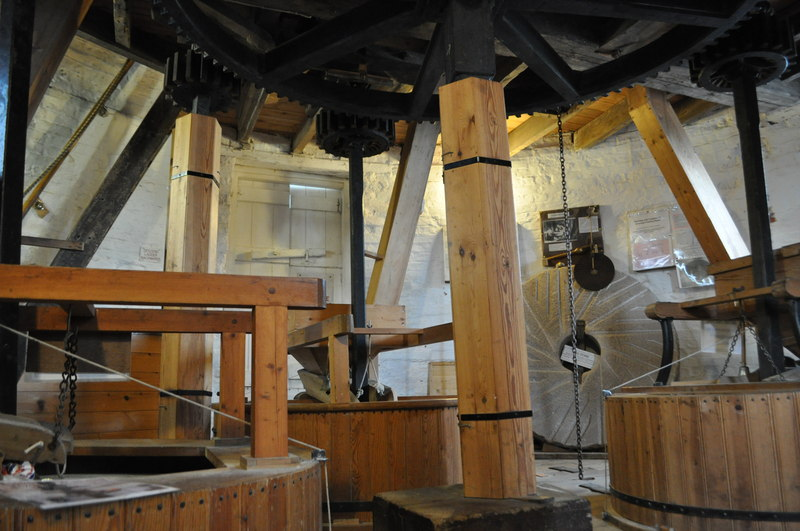
A view of the grinding floor in mid-2011

The five-armed sail-cross drove three pairs of stones and milled grain for over 60 years. But Hare died before August 1834, and the mill owner's widow, Ann Hare (née Bonner) (1807-1879), was left with two young children, one a son (James b. 1831), she then married a local miller Sleightholme Nash (1769-1847) around 1836. The mill eventually passed to Joseph Nash (Sleightholme Nash's son by an earlier marriage) who became its last miller before its destruction in 1890. A tail-wind made the sails run backwards after the destruction of the fantail by lightning leaving the cap rotating uncontrolled, blew off the entire cap with the curb smashing it with parts of the upper gear and all five sails to pieces, and destroyed the tower rim. Nash abandoned the wrecked mill.

In 1891 John Pocklington of Wyberton mill had bought the eight-sailed mill cap with gear of the 78-year-old defunct Tuxford's mill (built in 1813 at Skirbeck by the Tuxford millwright family is an example of their fine work) for just £72 at auction in Boston without any plans (N.B. the cost of a tower windmill was £2,000 in 1830). As a condition of the deal, he had to remove all the machinery from the mill site, so he was in an urgent need for a suitable mill stump to mount the cap on, as he had no place to put his acquisition. He bought the wrecked Heckington mill, and, from 1891 until early 1892, he fitted the white onion-shaped and fantail-driven Tuxford's Mill cap to the Heckington Mill and set it working for the following 54 years. Later he installed a large circular saw-mill in a shed on one side, also driven by wind-power using line-shafts. It was used to make elm boards for coffins. John Pocklington was successful in milling, baking, building, sawing, and farming. In that time and even up to today the mill was also called the Pocklington's Mill.

After Pocklington's death in 1941 the mill stopped working in 1946 for the next 40 years. The shutters ("shades" in Lincolnshire) were removed from the sails. In 1953 the mill came into the hands of Kesteven County Council who made the first restorations preventing the fine old mill from being dismantled and restoring it as a rare landmark. Only four of the eight sails could be installed (from the Old Bolingbroke and Wainfleet St Mary mills, ~ 22/25 miles north east of Heckington). The mill changed hands to Lincolnshire County Council and in 1986 the mill was finally restored to working order (the repairs included the construction of 192 new shades and four new sails sustained by the "Friends of Heckington Mill", with the new sails cross weighing five tons. The cap's overhang assures the fact it is from a mill with a much wider tower top. As a rare feature with post and smock mills (Dutch type mills) and common with "sail windmills" (with pole-shaped sailstocks and triangular sails) such as around the Mediterranean Sea) the sail-tips are linked together by steel rods or cables to prevent sagging in the sails, a probably unnecessary work with this kind of mill sails. Parts of the bigger timber wheels have iron teeth instead of wooden ones. Among the six floors the third one being the lower of the two bin floors provides two grain cleaners-a modern one driven by an electric motor and the other an old wind-driven separator. On the second floor, the stone and stage floor, there are the original three pairs of stones (two pairs of grey and one pair of French quartzite stones) and a drive down to the first floor with a fourth pair of stones. On the ground floor a fifth pair of stones was installed which could also be driven by wind if desired or rather by engine. The mill houses a mixer on the first floor and in addition an elevator from the ground floor. Due to its large sail area supplied by its eight sails and its well-winded site the mill is able to drive four pairs of millstones - now two pairs of French (quartzite) stones and two pairs of so-called Peak stones (Derbyshire sandstone) and is able to work in very light breezes, when other local mills do not. An additional dresser is used to make white flour from time to time.

The mill is run by the Heckington Windmill Trust (established in 1986). In 2014 the Trust purchased the buildings and land surrounding the windmill with help from a Heritage Lottery Fund grant. These buildings have been restored to provide an award-winning visitor centre, shop and bakehouse. The original Victorian miller's house has been converted to a tea room and cafe. There is also a micro brewery in the old saw mill, the 8 Sail Brewery.

The windmill has a hurst frame (a set of mill stones supported by a wooden frame) which is driven by an oil engine. This allows for milling when there is no wind.

== Opening times ==
The mill is open to visitors:

- Open All Year. Fridays, Saturdays and Sundays.
- Extended opening from mid July to early September for summer holidays

Visit website for more info: www.HeckingtonWindmill.org.uk

== Eight-sailed windmills ==
Heckington Windmill is the last survivor of around 12 eight-sailed windmills in England (four in Lincolnshire) including:

- Skirbeck Mill (Tuxford's Mill), Boston, Lincolnshire (machinery and sails moved to Heckington in 1890)
- Barrington Mill, Holbeach, Lincolnshire
- Market Rasen Mill, Market Rasen, Lincolnshire
- Preston Place Mill, Angmering, Sussex (a small multi-purpose mill for farming use)
- Old Buckenham tower windmill, Norfolk, still standing as a four-sailed mill after her damage in 1879
- Victoria Road tower mill, Diss, Norfolk; in 1880 converted into a four-sailed mill (in 1972 into a residence)
- Leach's tower mill in Wisbech, Isle of Ely, Cambridgeshire, eight-storeyed, the tallest eight-sailer ever built (now a residence).

These mills were converted into four-sailed mills, into residences, were dismantled, or still exist as ruins.

Mediterranean windmills ("sail-windmills") seem to have more sails, but their sails are in fact up to six long poles ('polestocks') forming a wheel-shaped sail-cross of 12 round sailstocks each holding one triangular sail. They do not have shutter-type or lattice-type sails (with canvas sails attached to the lattice blades) as they come with Dutch-type windmills the Heckington Windmill belongs to. Beside this there are a few post mills in Northern and Eastern Europe with six short (~ 15 ft) paddle-shaped sails, and in Finland there are some eight-sailed hollow-post windmills with a similar type of short sails.

Boyd's Windmill, Rhode Island, USA is another example of the larger type of windmill with eight sails.

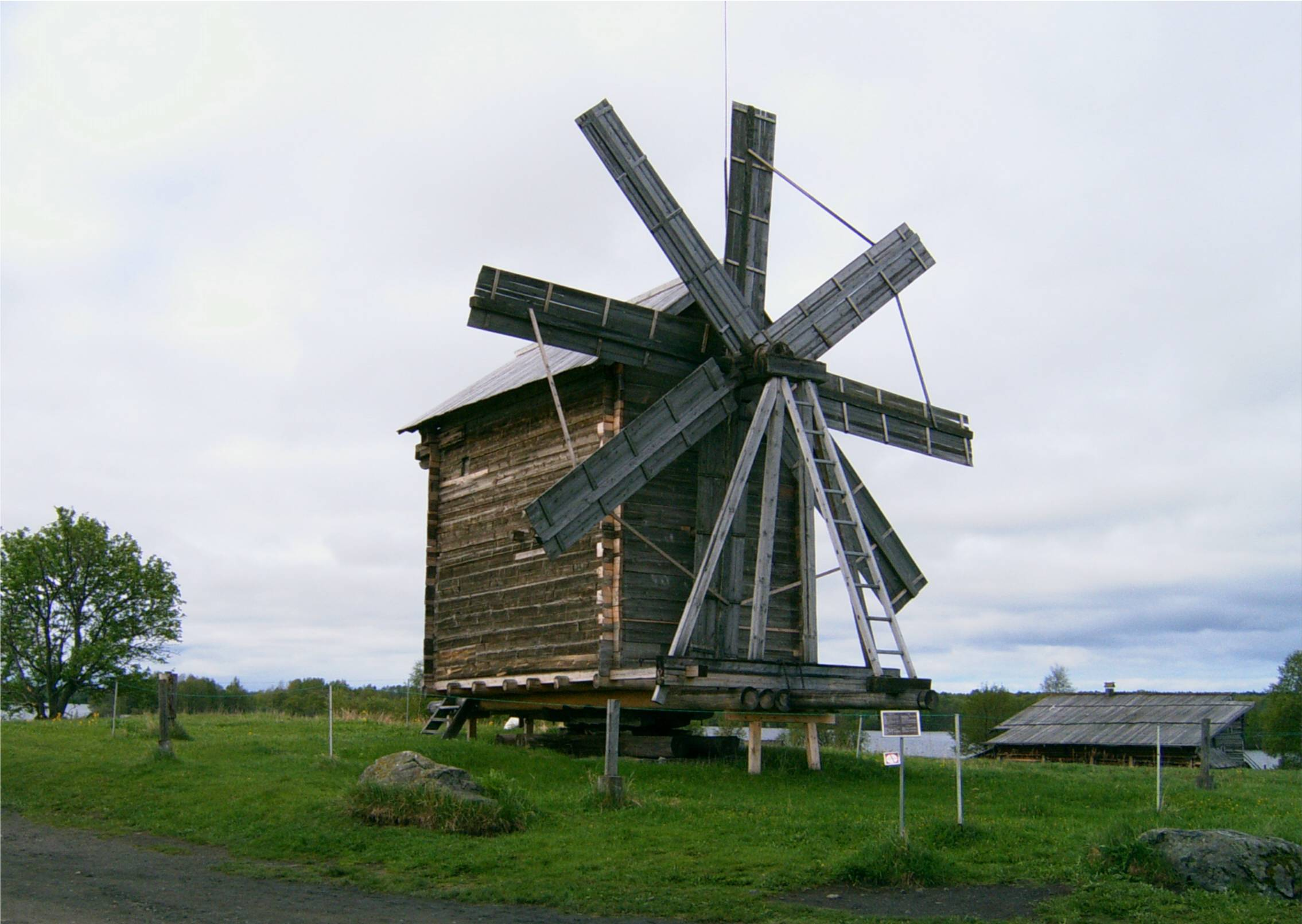
Eight-sailed post windmill with short sails on Kizhi island, Lake Onega, Russia
