= St Barbara's Church, Haceby =

Coordinates: 52.9122°N 0.4694°W

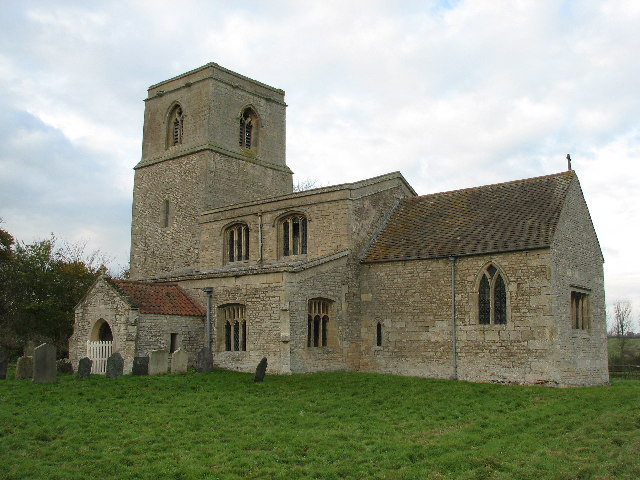
- St Barbara's Church, Haceby, from the southeast

- Location in Lincolnshire
- OS grid reference: TF 030 361
- Location: Haceby, Lincolnshire
- Country: England
- Denomination: Anglican
- Website: Churches Conservation Trust

History
- Dedication: Saint Barbara, Saint Margaret

Architecture
- Functional status: Redundant
- Heritage designation: Grade I
- Designated: 1 February 1967
- Architectural type: Church
- Style: Norman, Gothic

Specifications
- Materials: Limestone, tiled roofs

St Barbara's Church is a redundant Anglican church in the village of Haceby, Lincolnshire, England. It is recorded in the National Heritage List for England as a designated Grade I listed building, and is under the care of the Churches Conservation Trust. The church is situated some 8 miles (12.9 km) to the east of Grantham, about 1 mile (1.6 km) south of the A52 road. It has a double dedication to Saint Barbara and Saint Margaret.

== History ==
The church dates from the 12th century, with additions and alterations in each of the following four centuries. A partial restoration took place in 1890, and a further restoration in 1924. The village of Haceby is mentioned in the Domesday Book, and was once a thriving community, but it has shrunk in size and now consists of a few cottages, a farm and the church. The church was declared redundant in October 1973.

== Architecture ==
=== Exterior ===
The church is constructed in limestone with tiled roofs. Its plan consists of a nave with a clerestory, a south aisle, a south porch, a chancel, and a west tower. The tower is in three stages with a plain parapet. The lower two stages date from the 12th century and are constructed in rubble; the top stage is from the 14th century and is in ashlar. There are round-headed windows in the bottom stage on the west side, and in the middle stage on the south. The top stage contains two-light louvred bell openings with ogee heads and quatrefoils on each side. The north wall of the nave is rendered and contains a blocked doorway. In the north wall of the chancel is a 13th-century lancet window. The east window in the chancel dates from the 16th century, and has three lights, and in the south wall are a two-light window containing Y-tracery and a lancet window. The south aisle has three-light Perpendicular windows in the east and south walls. The 14th-century south porch is gabled, and contains benches on its sides. In the clerestory are two three-light windows on the south side, and a single similar window on the north.

=== Interior ===
The 13th-century south arcade has two bays carried on octagonal piers. The tower arch has traces of red paint. The chancel arch dates from the 11th century, and is in Norman style with a round arch. Above the arch are the painted Royal arms of Queen Anne, under which are traces of a medieval Doom or Harrowing of Hell painting. The chancel contains aumbries on the north and south sides. The octagonal font dates from the 14th century. The oak pulpit and panelling in the nave and chancel are from the 18th century.

== See also ==
- List of churches preserved by the Churches Conservation Trust in the East of England

Media related to St Margaret and St Barbara, Haceby at Wikimedia Commons
