= Culverthorpe Hall =

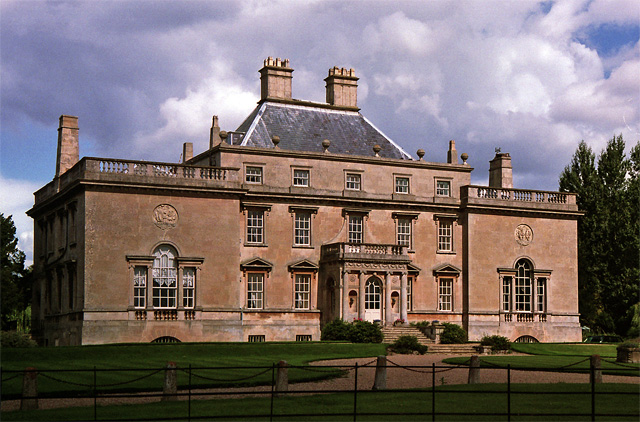

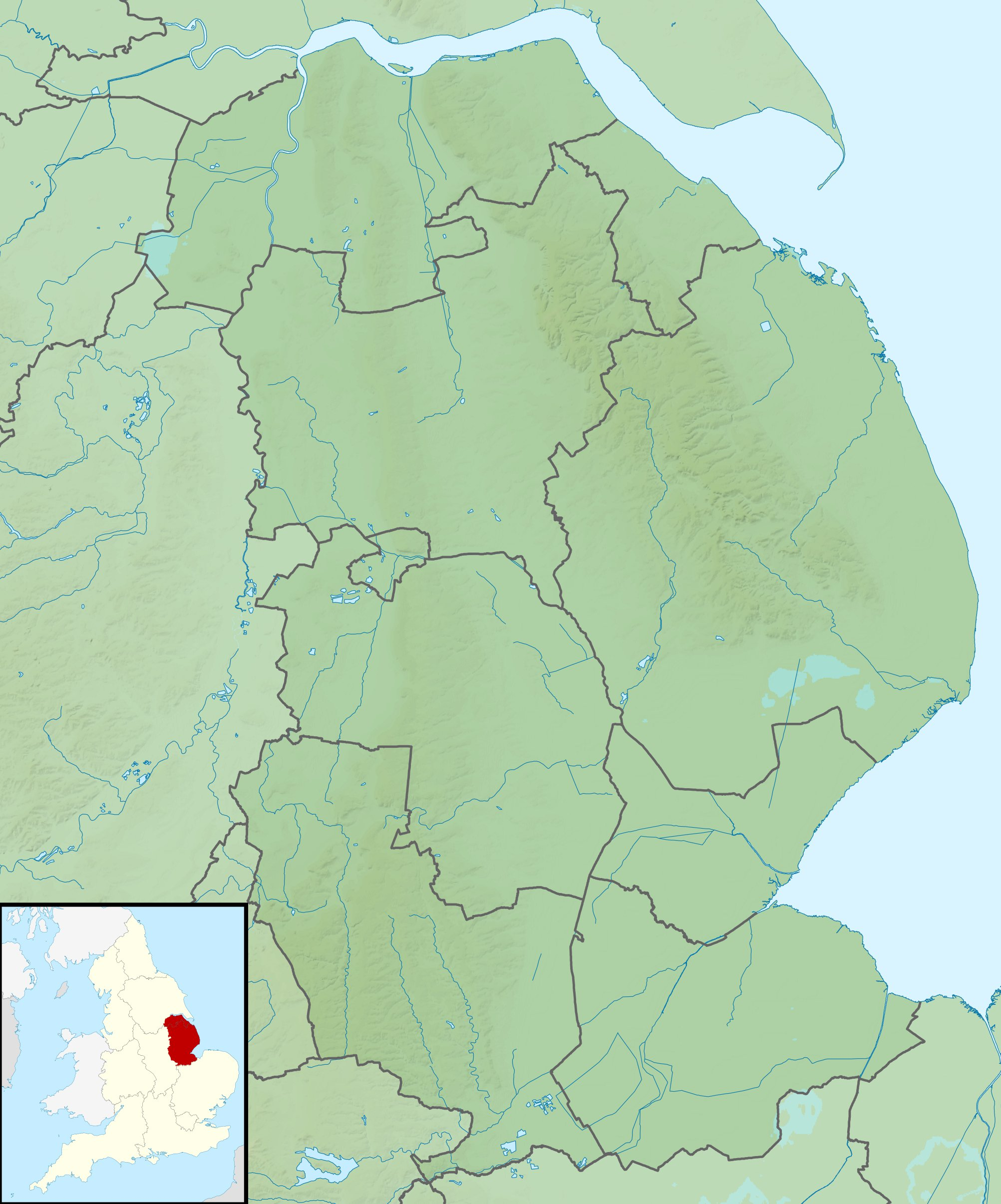
- Location within Lincolnshire
- 52.9511°N 0.483°W
- Type: House
- Location: Culverthorpe, Lincolnshire

Site notes
- Architectural style: Palladian
- Governing body: Privately owned

Listed Building – Grade I
- Official name: Culverthorpe Hall
- Designated: 23 November 1951
- Reference no.: 1061793

Listed Building – Grade II*
- Official name: The Stables to Culverthorpe Hall
- Designated: 23 November 1951
- Reference no.: 1147621

Listed Building – Grade II*
- Official name: The Garages to Culverthorpe Hall
- Designated: 23 November 1951
- Reference no.: 1360582

Listed Building – Grade II*
- Official name: Culverthorpe Temple
- Designated: 11 January 1990
- Reference no.: 1308442

Listed Building – Grade II
- Official name: Park Farm House
- Designated: 11 January 1990
- Reference no.: 1061794

Culverthorpe Hall, Culverthorpe, Lincolnshire, England is an 18th-century country house. It is a Grade I listed building.

== History ==
In the 17th century the estate at Culverthorpe was held by the Listers. In around 1679, it was bought by Sir John Newton, 2nd Baronet, who remodelled the existing house. (Note: Sir John, and many of his descendants, are buried in the Newton family chapel in the Church of St Michael, Heydour. Pevsner notes the "exceptionally good" set of family monuments.) His son, also John, undertook alterations in 1699. In the 1730s Sir John's grandson, Michael, made further changes, possibly employing either Roger Morris, who certainly worked on Newton's London house, or Robert Morris, who dedicated his Lectures on Architecture to Newton, or both. (Note: The Newtons of Culverthorpe were distantly related to Isaac Newton and Sir Michael was Chief Mourner at Newton's funeral in Westminster Abbey in 1727.) On his death in 1743, his only son having died in infancy, (Note: Newton's wife was Margaret, Countess Coningsby Their child is reputed to have been killed by a pet monkey which dropped the infant from the roof of Culverthorpe Hall. The tale has a number of variants; some versions placing the death at the Newton’s London house rather than at Culverthorpe. The antiquarian Charles Heath recounts that the child was dropped by a nurse, who had been startled by the monkey.) the estate passed to the Archer-Houblon family. In 1917 Major H. L. Archer Houblon sold the hall and 2170 acres of land, realising a combined total of £49,550. Rodolph Ladeveze Adlercron bought the hall in the early 20th century and employed Reginald Blomfield to undertake alterations. The hall remains privately owned.

== Architecture and description ==
Culverthorpe is of two storeys, with a raised attic. The style is Palladian. The central block is of five bays, and has two adjoining wings. The house is faced in limestone ashlar with slate roofs. Nikolaus Pevsner, in his Buildings of England, notes the possible attributions to either Robert or Roger Morris, or both.

The hall is a Grade I listed building. The stables and garages, originally a service wing but converted in the early 20th century, have their own Grade II* listings. An eyecatcher in the grounds, which comprises the facade of a former family chapel, is also Grade II* listed. The former home farm is listed at Grade II.

== Sources ==
- Heath, Charles (1806). Monmouthshire: Historical and Descriptive Accounts of the Ancient and Present State of Tintern Abbey. Monmouth, Wales: Charles Heath. OCLC 45744347.
- Pevsner, Nikolaus; Harris, John; Antram, Nicholas (2002). Lincolnshire. The Buildings Of England. New Haven, US and London: Yale University Press. ISBN 978-0-300-09620-0. OCLC 49298889.
