= Somerton Castle =

Castle in Lincolnshire, England

- Lincolnshire, England
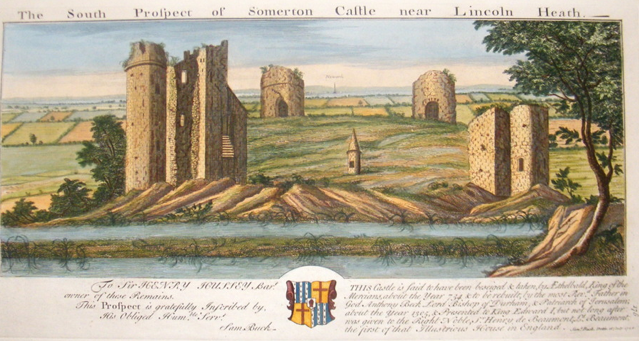
- Somerton Castle, engraving by Samuel and Nathaniel Buck

Site information
- Owner: Private
- Open to the public: No

Location
- Shown within Lincolnshire
- Location within Lincolnshire
- Coordinates: 53.1177°N 0.5760°W
- Grid reference: SK 95361 58739

Site history
- Materials: Limestone

Somerton Castle is located approximately 1 mile (1.6 km) west of the village of Boothby Graffoe in Lincolnshire, England and to the south of the city of Lincoln, England. The site is on low-lying land between the Lincoln Edge and the River Witham. Although Somerton Castle is in the parish of Boothby Graffoe, it is in the Manor of Waddington and this portion is often referred to as the Manor of Somerton Castle. Antony Bek probably built the castle in 1281 and he gave it to King Edward II in 1309. King John II of France was imprisoned at Somerton Castle between 1359 and 1360, having been taken prisoner after the Battle of Poitiers. It continued as crown property until it was sold by Charles I in 1628, since when the castle has continued in private ownership.

== Medieval history ==
Antony Bek inherited Somerton from his mother, Eva de Gray, and built the castle after being granted a licence to crenellate in 1281. In 1309 Bek gave the castle as a gift to King Edward II. The castle was found to be in poor condition at the accession of King Edward II, lead had been stolen from the towers and the great hall and the chapel, which were on the west side of the castle, were in poor repair. After the accession of Edward III in 1330, John Crabbe, a military engineer was appointed Constable of the Castle, and in autumn of 1334 King Edward visited the castle, presumably to authorise repair work. A total of £222 was spent during the next two years on rebuilding the outer drawbridge and remaking part of the moat – presumably this was the time when the outer bailey to the south of the castle was constructed. In late 1335 or early 1336 the Countess Alice de Lacy of Bolingbroke, Countess of Lincoln, was held and raped at Somerton after being kidnapped from her castle at Bolingbroke by Baron Hugh de Fresne. They married later that year, although without royal authority and so, by order of Edward III, they were held captive in separate towers in Somerton Castle. Royal assent was granted on 20 March 1336, however de Fresne died in December 1336 and the countess Alice returned to Bolingbroke. After Crabbe's death in 1351/2, Stephen Shawe was appointed as Constable and regular repairs took place to the domestic buildings in the inner court. Further repairs and alterations took place in 1359-60 when King John II of France was held captive in the castle having been taken prisoner after the Battle of Poitiers. Sir Saier De Rochford, ancestor of the Rochford family of Stoke Rochford, "an eminent soldier in the wars of France," and High Sheriff of Lincolnshire, was allowed two shillings a day for the safekeeping of King John while at Somerton.

By 1393 the castle was reported as being defective in walls, gates, towers, bridges, ditches, lead roofing, tiling, boarding, glazing and ironwork and would need the expenditure of £100 to repair. In 1408 King Henry VI granted the castle to Sir Ralph Rochford, who was High Sheriff of Lincolnshire in that year. He was to spend £112 12s. 9d on repairs during the next three years. The works carried out included making good the roof of the queen's hall, with its buttery and pantry, and repairing the chapel and chamber of St Christopher. The castle was held from the King by the Dukes of Clarence from 1415 until 1478, when George, Duke of Clarence was executed. The castle was allowed to fall into disrepair during this period and it suffered waste, dilapidation and strip from those who held it from the King.

== Later history ==
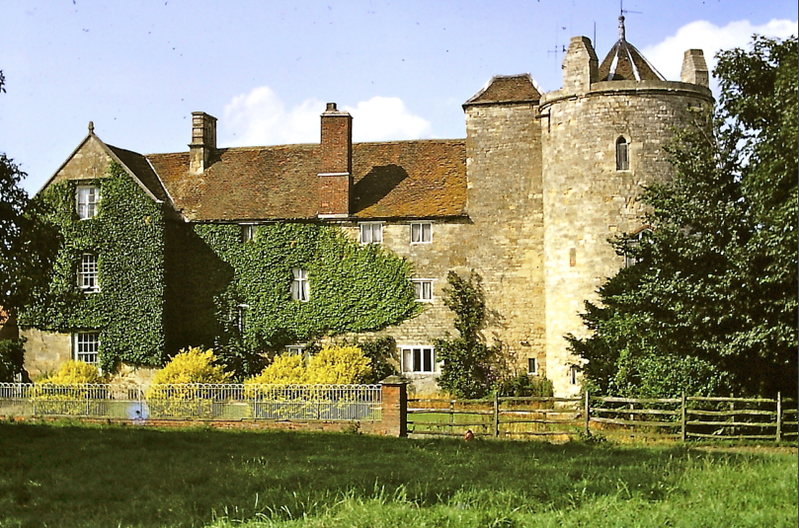
Somerton Castle, Boothby Graffoe, Lincolnshire, in 1973

The Castle was transferred to the estates of the Duchy of Lancaster by Henry VII and the castle and its lands were held by De’Isney or Disney family. A Duchy of Lancaster Survey of 1601 described the castle as being utterly defaced and fallen almost downe to the ground, but one of the four towers was standing almost to its full height. The property was bought from Charles I in 1628 by the Corporation of the City of London, and it then passed to the Hussey family.

The print produced by Samuel Buck in 1726 is dedicated to Sir Henry Hussey, and this print shows the castle as in much the same state as described in 1601. Sir Henry left Somerton Castle to his aunt Jane Hatcher, who died in 1734, and it then passed to the Pochin family of Barkby in Leicestershire, who sold the castle to Montague Cholmeley of Easton in 1780.

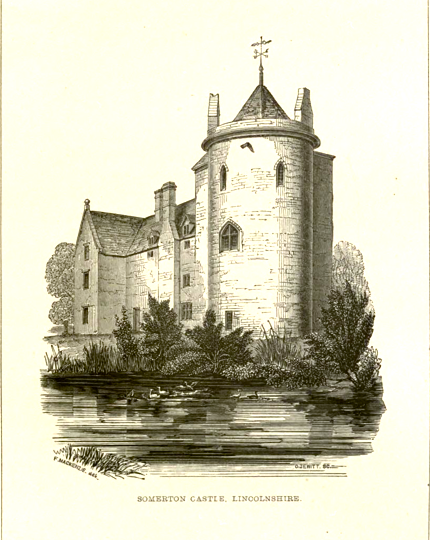
Somerton Castle from the S.E. in 1850

The property and estate were bought from Sir Montague Cholmeley, 1st Baronet in 1812 by the Isaac Marfleet of Bassingham who had been previously leasing the castle; the property then passed on to several of the family's descendants, until it passed to the Battersby family, who sold the castle and surrounding farmland in the mid-1970s.

About 2010, due to the deterioration of the fabric of the castle buildings, Somerton Castle was put on the English Heritage Buildings at Risk register, and Ridge & Morris of Snape in Suffolk were commissioned as architects to draw up plans for the restoration of the castle. Planning consents were granted by North Kesteven District Council for additional building work, which included a new wing extending to the northwards behind the south front, and also the conversion of the 19th-century farm buildings into dwellings.

== Architecture and visible remains ==
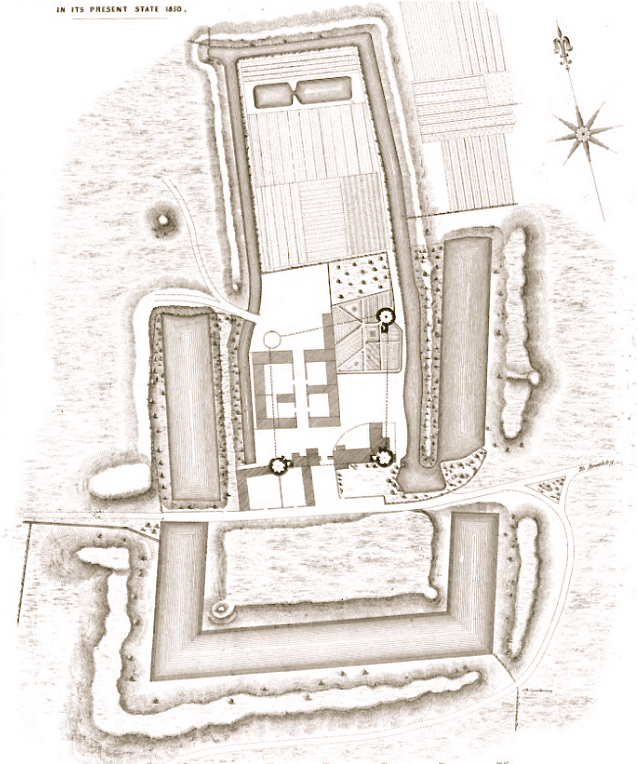
Plan of Somerton Castle by J. S. Padley, 1850

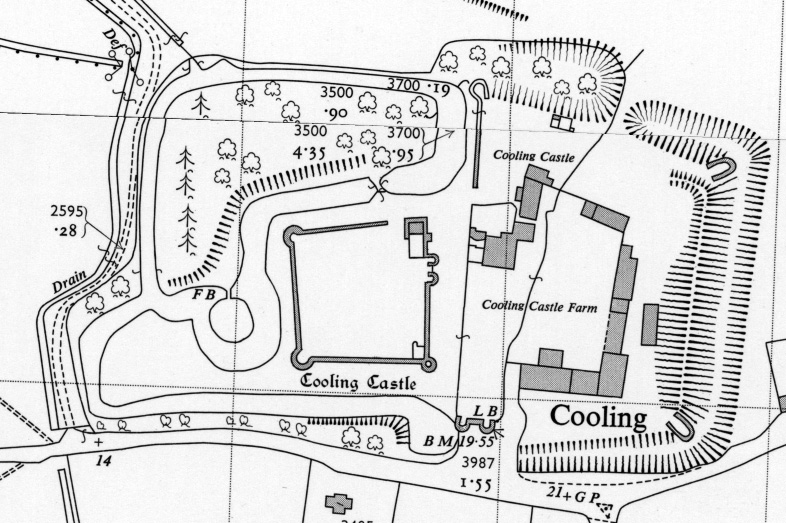
Cooling Castle, Kent OS map 1964 – for comparison with Somerton Castle.

The medieval castle appears to have most in common in its plan and layout with later castles of the 14th century and early 15th century such as Maxstoke Castle in Warwickshire, Wingfield Castle in Suffolk and, in particular Cooling Castle near Rochester in Kent. These castles are set in moats with roughly rectangular curtain walls between corner towers. Cooling Castle was licensed to crenellate in 1381, and in front of the rectangular inner bailey is a trapezoid-shaped outer bailey with open-backed corner towers. This is the arrangement that is indicated in Padley's plan, even though the towers are shown as mounds at the corners. These open-backed artillery towers started appearing in Europe around 1330 and would have been familiar to John Crabbe, the Constable of the Castle, who came from Flanders. In these towers the artillery would be placed on two or three floors and the open backs to the towers gave ventilation from the fumes released by igniting gunpowder. This forward defence is likely to have been placed in front of the main gate to the inner bailey of Somerton Castle, and the towers would have given the artillery a sweep of about 270º to the south of the castle.

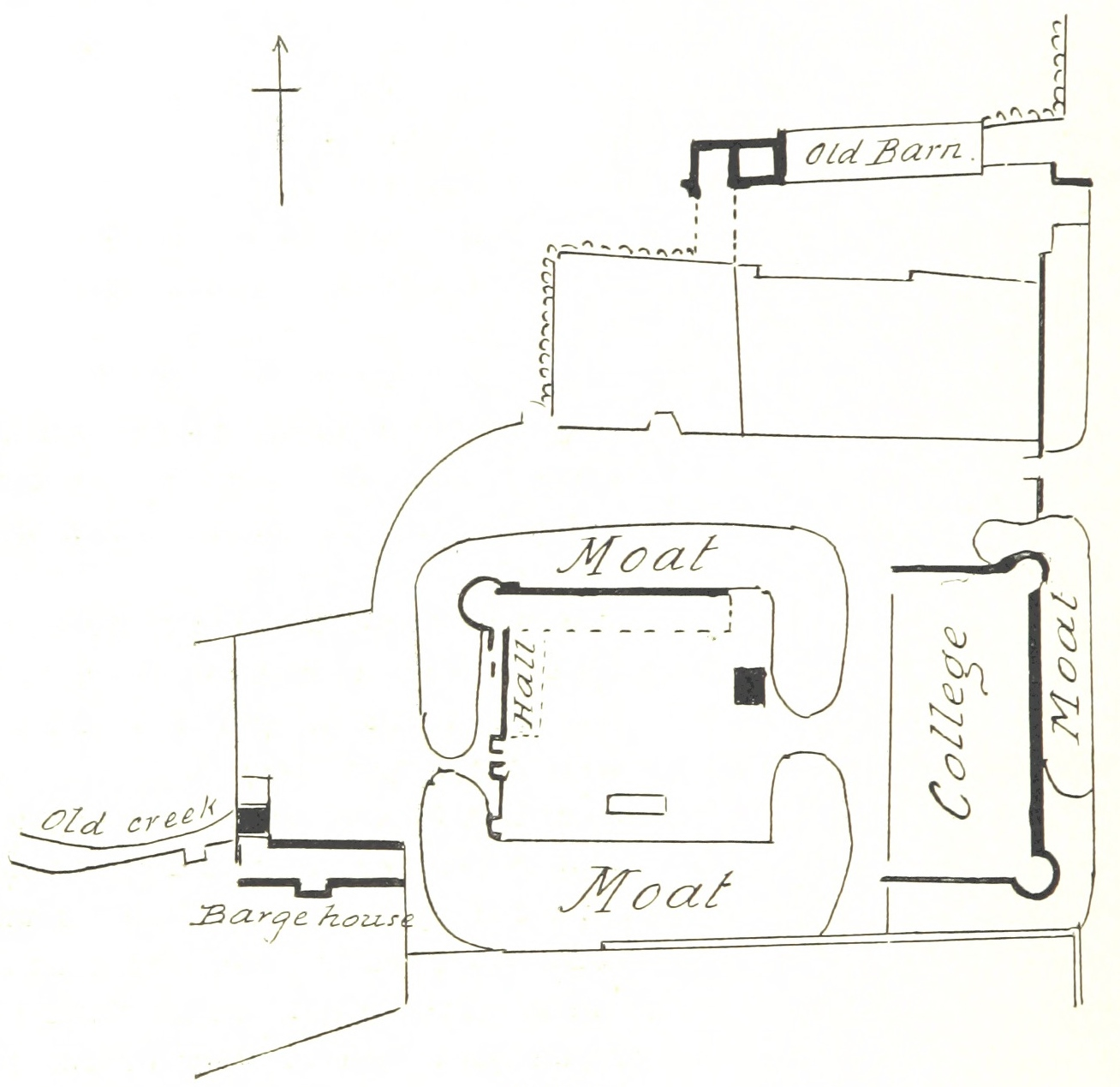
Caister Castle from J. D. Mackenzie's The Castles of England: their story and structure

A similar layout was adopted for Sir John Fastolf's castle at Caistor by Great Yarmouth in the 1430s. Caister Castle, built in brick, was laid out with three rectangular baileys, each of which was surrounded by a water-filled moat and fortified with open-back towers in the forward bailey. One of the corner towers of the rectangular inner bailey is much taller than the other three.

Some prominent and visible enclosures still surround the site, including parts of the moat. What remains of the castle walls are incorporated into the present farmhouse. The castle has been recognised as an important building and has been classified as a Grade I listed building.

== Gallery ==
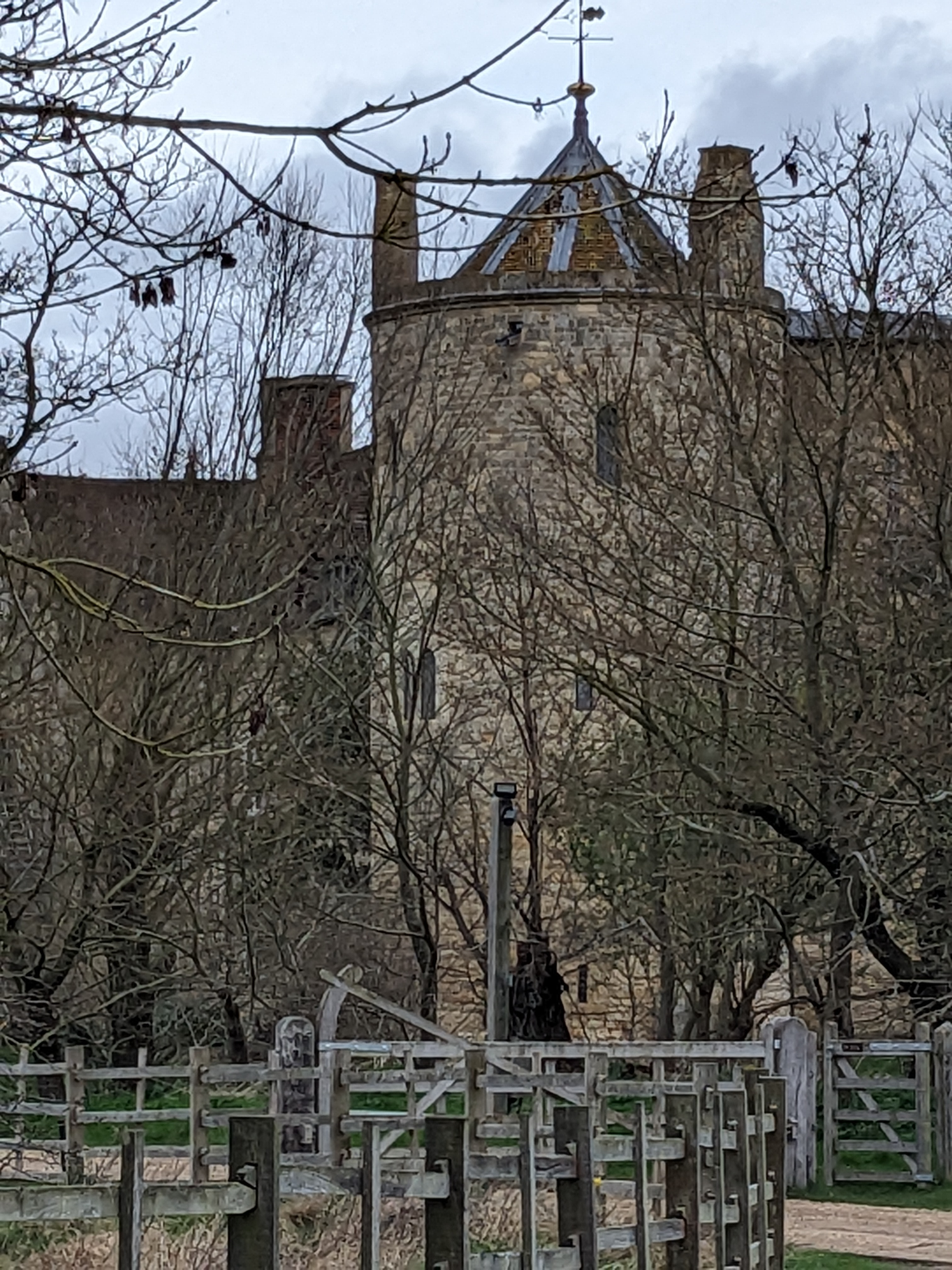
Somerton Castle viewed from road

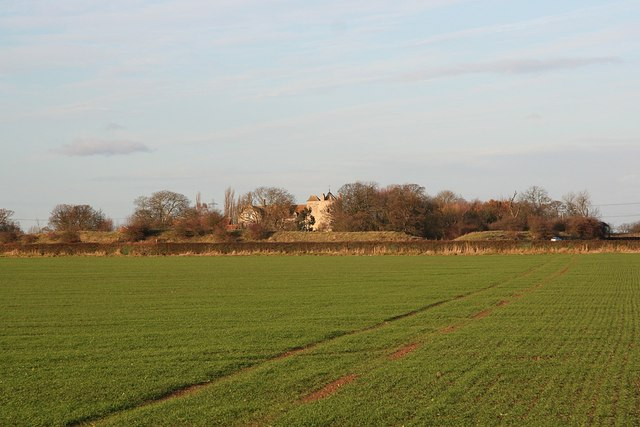
Somerton Castle today

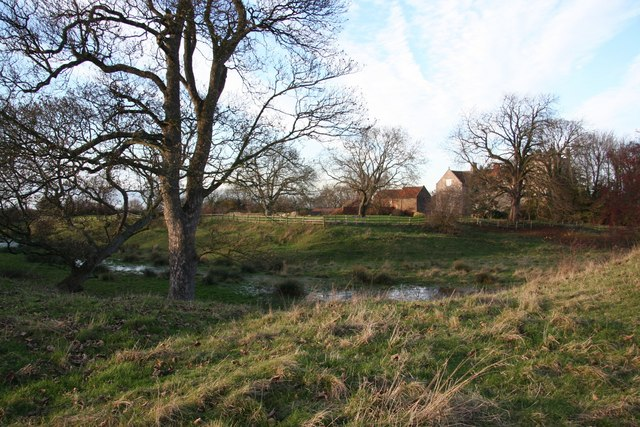
Somerton Castle

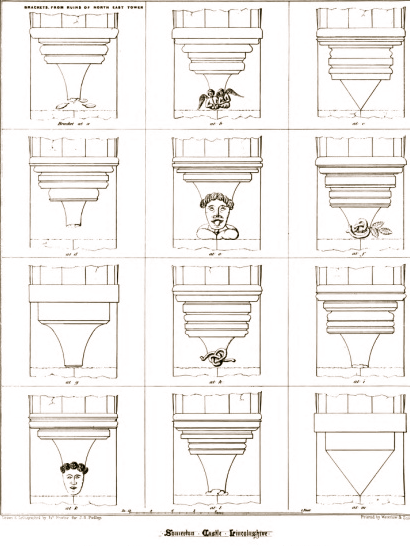
Somerton Castle. Illustration by James Sandby Padley

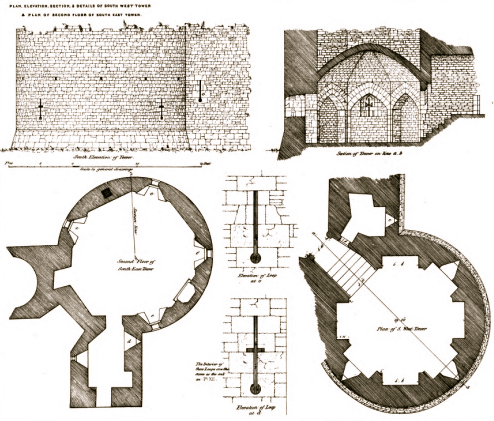
Towers at Somerton Castle. Illustration by James Sandby Padley

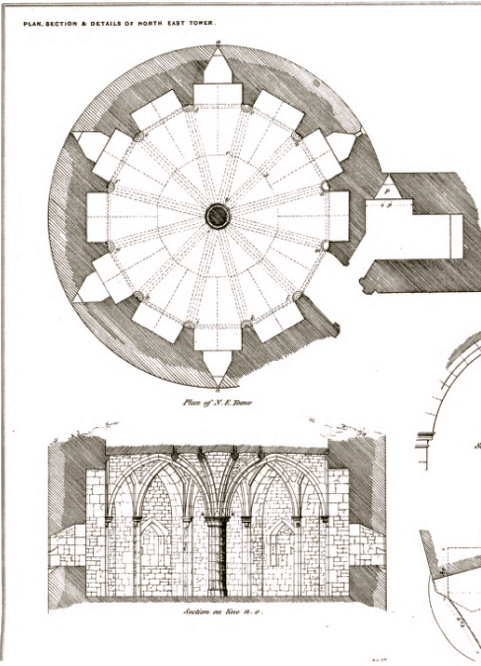
Tower at Somerton Castle. Illustration by James Sandby Padley

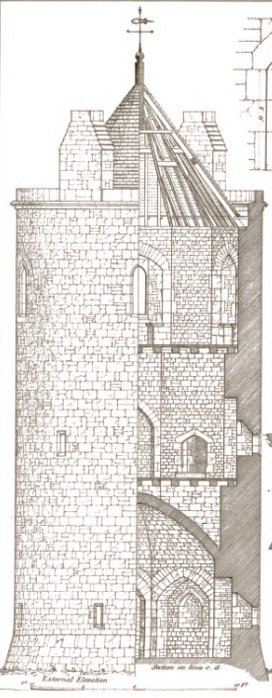
Tower at Somerton Castle. Illustration by James Sandby Padley

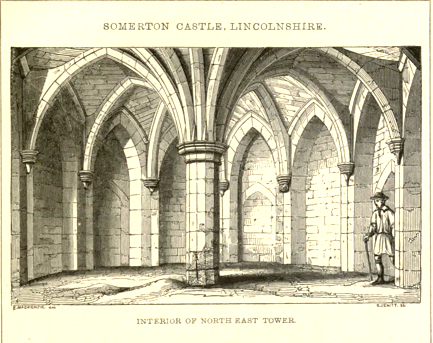
North East Tower- Interior vaulting

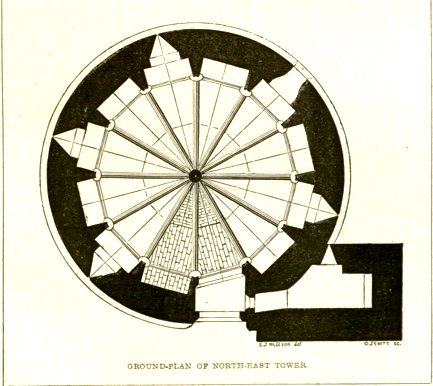
North East Tower - plan of interior

== Literature ==
- Antram N. (revised), Pevsner N. & Harris J., (1989), The Buildings of England: Lincolnshire, Yale University Press. p. 660.
- Blagg, T. M., (1933), "Somerton Castle" Transactions of the Thoroton Society of Nottinghamshire Vol. 37 pp. 49–60 doi:10.5284/1112079
- Padley J. S. (1851) Selections from the ancient monastic ecclesiastical and domestic edifices of Lincolnshire
- Trollope E., (1857a) Trollope, E., 1857, The Captivity of John, King of France, at Somerton Castle, Associated Architectural Societies' reports and papers (Lincoln, York, Northampton, Bedford, Worcester, Leicester and Sheffield) Vol. 4 pp. 49–64
- Trollope, E., (1857b), Somerton Castle and its Builder Associated Architectural Societies' reports and papers (Lincoln, York, Northampton, Bedford, Worcester, Leicester and Sheffield) Vol. 4 pp. 83–91
- Trollope, E., (1882), "Somerton Castle", The Archaeological Journal Vol. 39 pp. 180–3 doi:10.5284/1067651
- Turner T. Hudson (1851/1877) 2nd ed. Some account of the Domestic Architecture of England, from the Conquest to the End of the 13th Century. Parker, Oxford & London pp. 172–3. Contains 'Notes on Somerton Castle' by Edward James Willson.
