= Culverthorpe =

Hamlet in Lincolnshire, England

Coordinates: 52.950163°N 0.476654°W

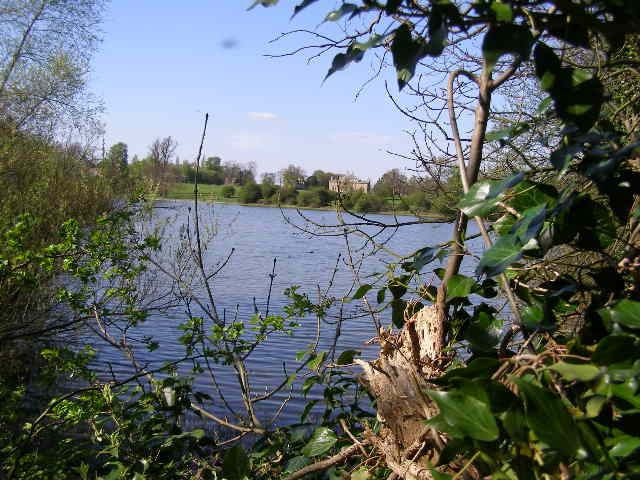
- Lakeside at Culverthorpe, overlooked by Culverthorpe Hall

- Location within Lincolnshire
- OS grid reference: TF024402
  - London: 100 mi (160 km) S
- Civil parish: Culverthorpe and Kelby
- District: North Kesteven
- Shire county: Lincolnshire
- Region: East Midlands
- Country: England
- Sovereign state: United Kingdom
- Post town: Grantham
- Postcode district: NG32
- Dialling code: 01400
- Police: Lincolnshire
- Fire: Lincolnshire
- Ambulance: East Midlands
- UK Parliament: Grantham and Bourne

Culverthorpe is a hamlet in the civil parish of Culverthorpe and Kelby, in the North Kesteven district of Lincolnshire, England. It lies 5 miles (8 km) south-west from Sleaford, 9 miles (14 km) north-east from Grantham and 3 miles (5 km) south-east from Ancaster.

== History ==
According to A Dictionary of British Place Names, the 'thorpe' in Culverthorpe derives from the Old Scandinavian for "outlying farmstead or hamlet", with 'Culver' the later added owner's name of uncertain origin.

In the Domesday account Culverthorpe is written as "Torp". The settlement was in the Aswardhurn Hundred of Kesteven, Lincolnshire.There were nine households, eight villagers, a priest and a church, four ploughlands and 120 acres (0.5 km^{2}) of meadow. Before the Conquest the lordship was held by Tonni of Lusby but afterwards by Gilbert of Ghent who also became Tenant-in-chief.

The hamlets of Heydour and Culverthorpe passed through various plantagenet owners during the reign of Henry III. The Grade I listed Culverthorpe Hall, together with its estate, farm, park and lake, was constructed in 1679 for the Newton family "in the Italian style" with later additions. In the reign of Charles II the house and estate descended to Sir John Newton, 2nd Baronet, MP for Grantham for 25 years, then to his son, another John, and then to his grandson Sir Michael Newton, Bt, appointed Knight of the Order of the Bath in 1725 and also MP for Grantham. On Sir Michael's death in 1743 the estate transferred to his sister, Susanna Archer, and through her to her issue and their siblings, who adopted the Newton name. The last Newton, another Michael, died in 1803, whereupon the house became untenanted. In the 20th century the estate transferred to the Dymoke branch of the family.

Culverthorpe is recorded in the 1872 White's Directory as a village and township in the parish of Haydor (Heydour), with a population of 101 in 846 acres (3.4 km^{2}) of land. Culverthorpe land was owned by J. A. Houblon [John Archer-Houblon (1803-1891)] of Hallingbury Place [demolished 1926, at Great Hallingbury] in Essex. Culverthorpe Hall was unoccupied in 1872, but its owner and lord of the manor derived the house from his grandfather, "the last of the Newtons". The chapel built by the Newtons was disused, and there were "no traces of the ancient chapel, dedicated to St Bartholomew". The principal inhabitants of Culverthorpe in 1872 were three farmers, one of whom was also a carpenter and builder.

Culverthorpe was formerly a chapelry in the parish of Haydor, in 1866 Culverthorpe became a separate civil parish, on 1 April 1931 the parish was abolished and merged with Kelby to form "Culverthorpe and Kelby". In 1921 the parish had a population of 81.

The chapel dedicated to St Bartholomew once stood in the hamlet, its pews later being added to the church of St Andrew at Kelby.
