= Kelby =

Hamlet in the North Kesteven district of Lincolnshire, England

Coordinates: 52.960976°N 0.505892°W

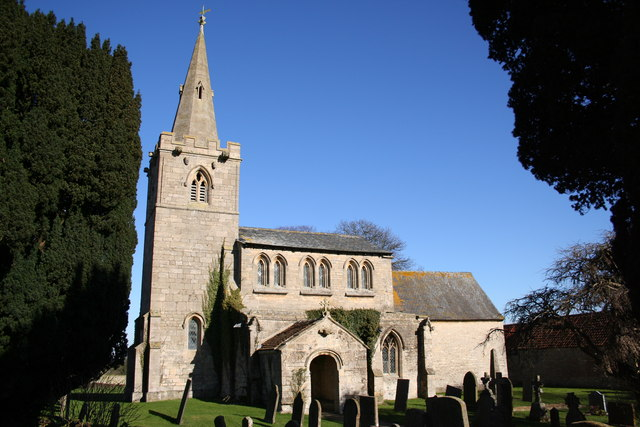
- St Andrew's Church, Kelby

- Location within Lincolnshire
- OS grid reference: TF004414
  - London: 105 mi (169 km) S
- Civil parish: Culverthorpe and Kelby
- District: North Kesteven
- Shire county: Lincolnshire
- Region: East Midlands
- Country: England
- Sovereign state: United Kingdom
- Post town: Grantham
- Postcode district: NG32
- Dialling code: 01400
- Police: Lincolnshire
- Fire: Lincolnshire
- Ambulance: East Midlands
- UK Parliament: Grantham and Bourne

Kelby is a village in the civil parish of Culverthorpe and Kelby, in the North Kesteven district of Lincolnshire, England. It lies 5 miles (8 km) south-west from Sleaford, 9 miles (14 km) north-east from Grantham and 3 miles (5 km) south-east from Ancaster. Kelby was formerly a chapelry in the parish of Haydor, in 1866 Kelby became a separate civil parish, on 1 April 1931 the parish was abolished and merged with Culverthorpe to form "Culverthorpe and Kelby". In 1921 the parish had a population of 61.

Kelby church is dedicated to St Andrew. Its tower was rebuilt in 1881 after a collapse. The church basement is Norman and the font Early English, with pews originally from the chapel at nearby Grade II listed Culverthorpe Hall.
