= Newton, Lincolnshire =

Hamlet in the North Kesteven district of Lincolnshire, England

Coordinates: 52.9134°N 0.44459°W

Newton
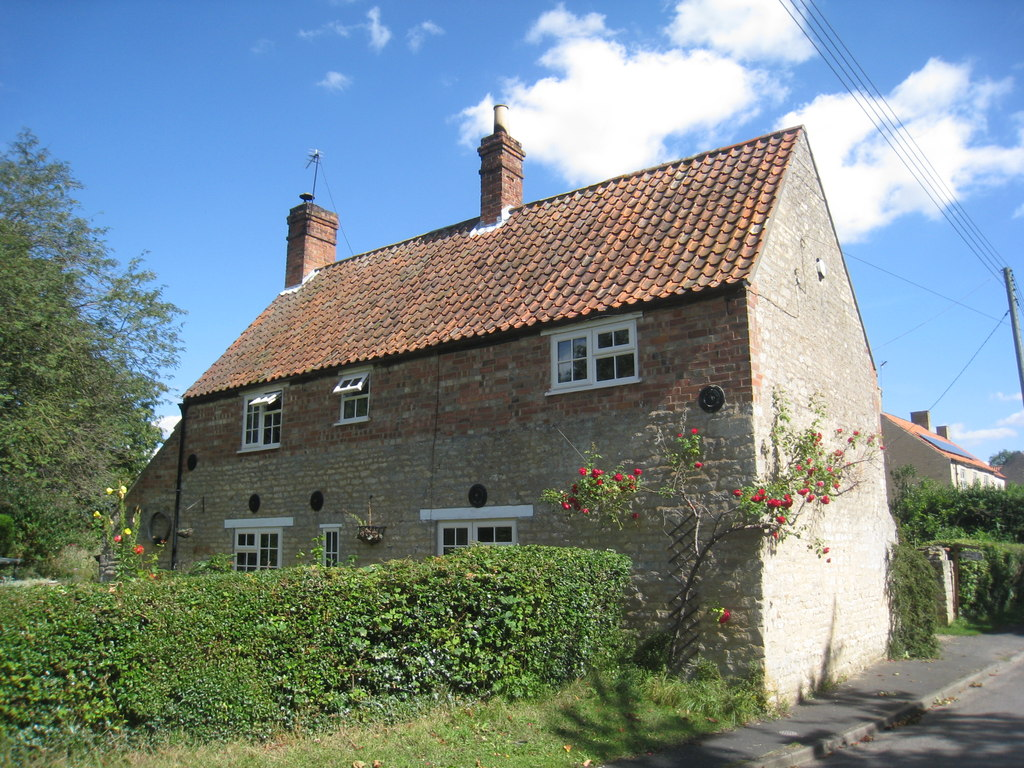
- Cottage in Newton

- Location within Lincolnshire
- OS grid reference: TF046362
  - London: 100 mi (160 km) S
- Civil parish: Newton and Haceby
- District: North Kesteven
- Shire county: Lincolnshire
- Region: East Midlands
- Country: England
- Sovereign state: United Kingdom
- Post town: Sleaford
- Postcode district: NG34
- Dialling code: 01529
- Police: Lincolnshire
- Fire: Lincolnshire
- Ambulance: East Midlands
- UK Parliament: Sleaford and North Hykeham (UK Parliament constituency)

Newton is a village in the civil parish of Newton and Haceby, in the North Kesteven district of Lincolnshire, England. The village is situated approximately 8 miles (13 km) east from the town of Grantham, 7 miles (11 km) south from Sleaford, and less than 1 mile (1.6 km) south from the A52 road.

== History ==
Newton dates as a settlement from before Roman occupation. The entry for 'Newton' in the 1086 Domesday Book describes the settlement as a bovate of 15 acres (0.1 km^{2}), and:

M. In NEWTON Alsi had 7 bovates of land taxable, Land for 10 oxen, odo has 1 plough, 1 sokeman on 1 bovate of this land; 5 villieins and 4 borders with 1½ ploughs, a church; 12 acres meadow, woodland; pasture 70 acres (280,000 m^{2}). Value before 1066 £4; now the same, Tallage 40 shillings.

It is estimated during this time that the population was 100 to 125 people.

Housing development has occurred since the mid-1990s, with the number of habituated buildings almost doubling. Population in 2007 was approximately 70 people compared to about 30 in the early 1980s, although the highest population recorded was 221 in 1846. Most of the surrounding land is owned by the Welby Estate and are farmed by the Sapperton Farming Company.

A previous blacksmiths building, The Old Smithy, was operational until about 1920. Later in the century it became ruined, and was demolished in 2002.

In 1921 the civil parish had a population of 165. On 1 April 1931 the parish was abolished to form "Newton and Haceby" and Aunsby and Dembleby, part also went to Osbournby.

== Landmarks ==
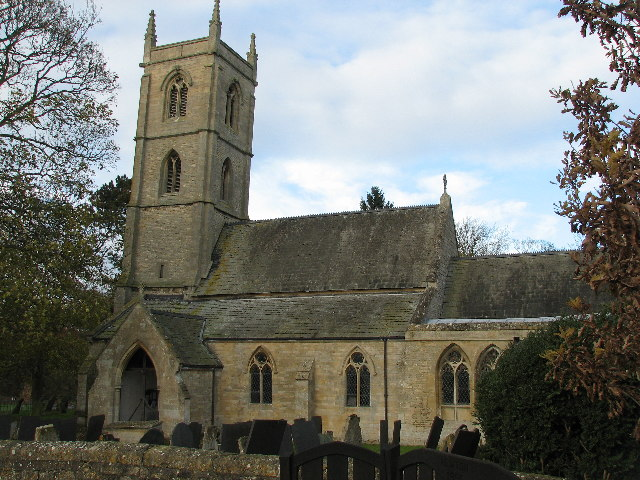
St Botolph's Church.

Newton is largely within a conservation area and contains a number of listed buildings.

Newton Church of England parish church is dedicated to St Botolph. The church is an example of Early English 14th- and 15th-century church architecture although it stands on a site of an earlier church that is recorded in the 1087 Domesday Book. The church, after falling into disrepair, was extensively restored in 1987, at which time five bells were hung instead of the previous three. Newton ecclesiastical parish today falls under the care of the Rector of Folkingham.

Further historic buildings include 17th-century Woodruff Cottage, 18th-century Newton Farmhouse, The Old Farmhouse, and Woodside House which is probably only a part of a larger house called West Hall whose estate included the land north to the A52 and west almost to Haceby.

The School House, built in 1874 by the Welby family, closed in 1970. In 1945 the new education act removed children over 11 and bicycles had to be provided for pupils to ride 3 miles (5 km) to a school in Osbournby.

The 19th-century Moat House was erected on the site of the ruins of an earlier hall and is named after the nearby moat which was the base of a windmill In the early 19th century the windmill was replaced by a summer house with a Chinese bridge over the moat.

The Old Post Office, a 17th-century building originally owned by the Segrave family, is called so because part of the house was a post office until about 1974.

Newton House, built in 1840 and extended in 1851, was built for the eldest Welby family son of the time. During the 1970s and 1980s the house was unoccupied and was bought and restored in the early 1990s. The Old Rectory, on the site of a previous rectory, was built at the same time as Newton house, as was Laundry Cottage which lies close to an artificial pool. The washing for Newton house was carried out in a special wing of the cottage.

The Village Cross stands at the location of a school, built by the Welby family, that was demolished in 1939. Newton's public house is The Red Lion, a 17th-century building. The hamlet also contains a pottery studio and a post box.
