= Haceby =

Village in Lincolnshire, England

Coordinates: 52.911011°N 0.470317°W

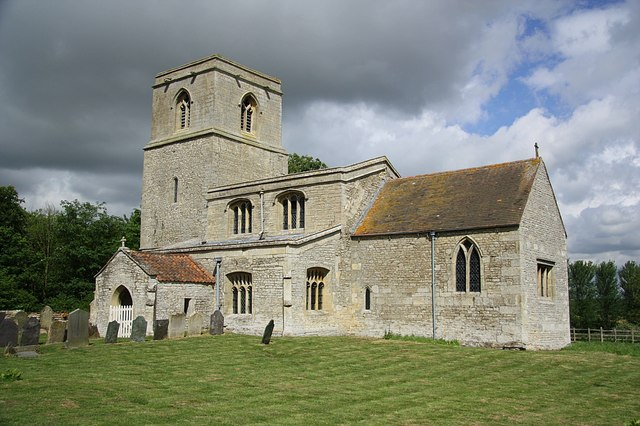
- Church of St Barbara, Haceby

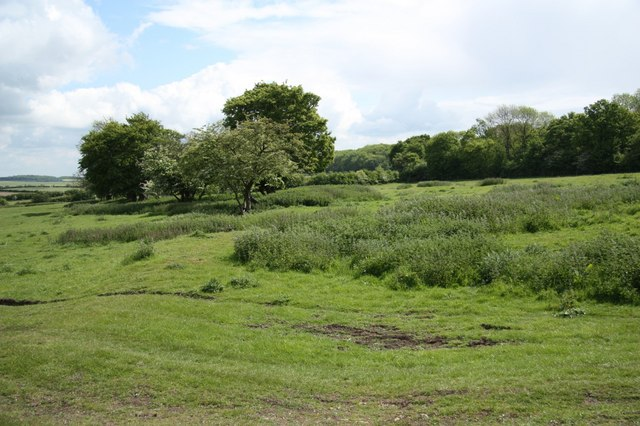
- Haceby shrunken village The field east of the church showing the undulations where the medieval village of Haceby extended.

- Location within Lincolnshire
- OS grid reference: TF029359
  - London: 100 mi (160 km) S
- Civil parish: Newton and Haceby
- District: North Kesteven
- Shire county: Lincolnshire
- Region: East Midlands
- Country: England
- Sovereign state: United Kingdom
- Post town: Sleaford
- Postcode district: NG34
- Dialling code: 01529
- Police: Lincolnshire
- Fire: Lincolnshire
- Ambulance: East Midlands
- UK Parliament: Sleaford and North Hykeham (UK Parliament constituency)

Haceby is a village in the civil parish of Newton and Haceby in the district of North Kesteven, Lincolnshire, England. It is 8 miles (13 km) east from Grantham, 8 miles south from Sleaford, and 1 mile (1.6 km) south from the A52 road. In 1921 the parish had a population of 51. On 1 April 1931 the parish was abolished and merged with Newton to form "Newton and Haceby".

In the Domesday account the village is written as "Hazebi". The -by suffix is a Scandinavian word ending, for a place name based on a personal name. It is suggested that the origin is Farmstead or village of Haddr.

Haceby consists of a small number of houses, farm buildings, and the Grade I listed redundant St Barbara's Church. Although dedicated to St Barbara, it is also attributed to St Margaret or to both saints.

Earthworks to the west of the village are still visible as the remains of a Roman Villa. In 1818 a tessellated pavement and other Roman remains were discovered.

The village's war memorial is found combined with that of Newton, in Newton's St Botolph Church.
