= Osbournby =

Village in Lincolnshire, England

Coordinates: 52.930130°N 0.409205°W

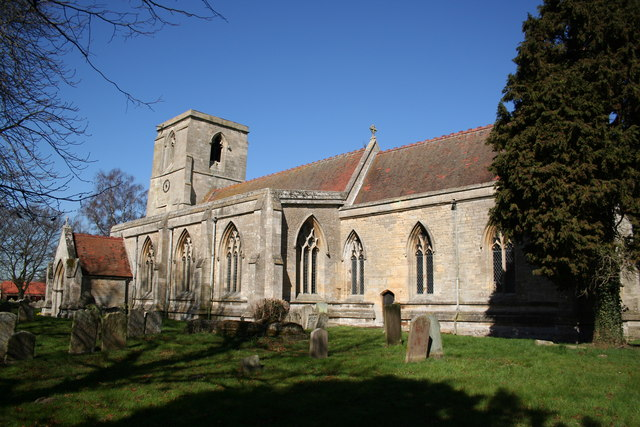
- Church of St Peter and St Paul, Osbournby

- Location within Lincolnshire
- Population: 398 (2011)
- OS grid reference: TF070381
  - London: 100 mi (160 km) S
- District: North Kesteven
- Shire county: Lincolnshire
- Region: East Midlands
- Country: England
- Sovereign state: United Kingdom
- Post town: Sleaford
- Postcode district: NG34
- Police: Lincolnshire
- Fire: Lincolnshire
- Ambulance: East Midlands
- UK Parliament: Sleaford and North Hykeham

Osbournby (locally pronounced Ozzenby or Ossenby) is a small village and civil parish in the North Kesteven district of Lincolnshire, England. The population of the civil parish (including Spanby) at the 2011 census was 381.

== Geography ==
It is located 5 miles (8.0 km) south from Sleaford on the A15 road near the A52 roundabout. Adjacent villages include Spanby, Aunsby and Threekingham. In 2001 the village had a population of 358.

The church is dedicated to St Peter and St Paul. The village public house is the Whichcote Arms on London Road (A15). There is a small primary school and nursery in the village.

=== Roundabout ===
In 1965 the police and East Kesteven Road Safety Committee wanted a roundabout built at the A52 crossroads, but there was no electricity for lighting. There had been many accidents at the site.

In late May 1966 the Kesteven County highways committee decided to build a 90-ft diameter roundabout during 1966-67, but in November 1966 it would not happen for 18 months due it taking a long time to acquire land, and revised Ministry of Transport standards.

The Esso Fourways Filling Station was next to the junction, which was demolished. It would cost £39,700. Construction started in June 1968, to take six months.

== History ==
One Saturday in 1791 a match at foot-ball was played in Osbournby field between the bachelors of Osbournby and Billingboro'; when, after a severe contest of six hours, wherein several feats of agility were shewn, it was decided in favour of the youths of Billingbor'; on which occasion they wore favours of blue ribband, as a mark of their distinction.
