= Spanby =

Village and former civil parish in Lincolnshire, England

Coordinates: 52.929290°N 0.37939°W

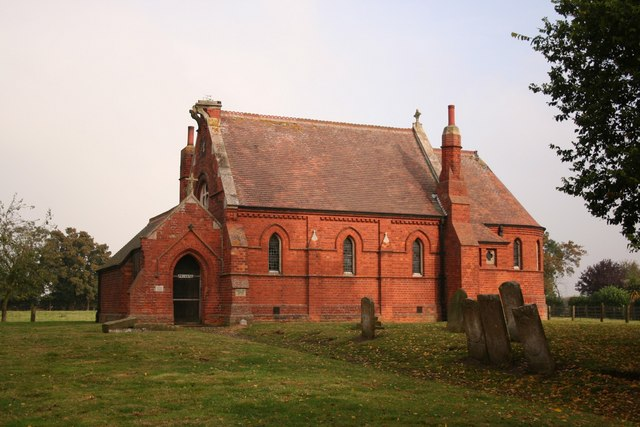
- Former St Nicholas' Church, Spanby

- Location within Lincolnshire
- OS grid reference: TF090381
  - London: 100 mi (160 km) S
- Civil parish: Threekingham
- District: North Kesteven
- Shire county: Lincolnshire
- Region: East Midlands
- Country: England
- Sovereign state: United Kingdom
- Post town: Sleaford
- Postcode district: NG34
- Police: Lincolnshire
- Fire: Lincolnshire
- Ambulance: East Midlands
- UK Parliament: Grantham and Bourne

Spanby is a village and former civil parish, now in the parish of Threekingham, in the North Kesteven district of Lincolnshire, England, about 5 miles (8 km) south from the town of Sleaford. In 1921 the parish had a population of 84. On 1 April 1931 the parish was abolished and merged with Threekingham.

The 1086 Domesday Book lists the village as "Spanebi", consisting of 12 households.

The parish church is a Grade II listed building dedicated to Saint Nicholas. It was declared redundant by the Diocese of Lincoln in 1973, and is now used as a shed. The 1882 rebuilt red-brick building is on or near the site of an earlier church dating from the 13th century. The door to the vestry dates from the 14th century.
