= Boothby Graffoe =

Village and civil parish in Lincolnshire, England

Coordinates: 53.122800°N 0.528055°W

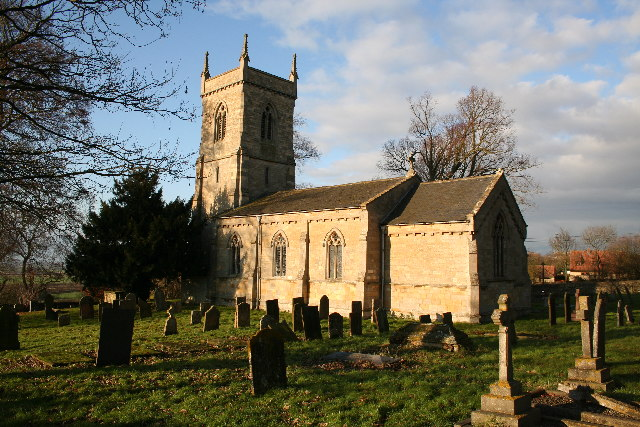
- Church of St Andrew, Boothby Graffoe

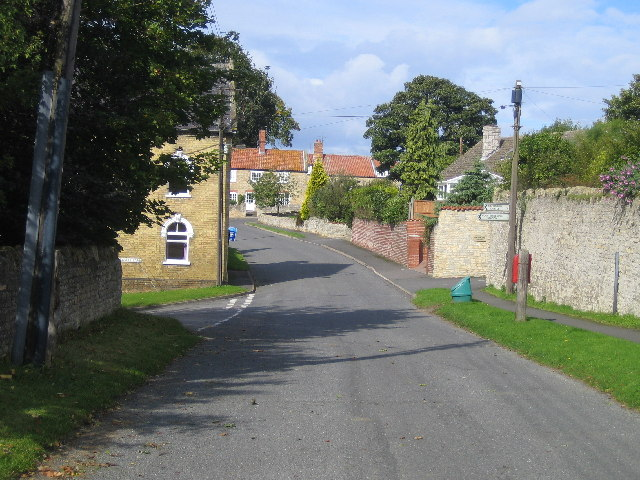
- Main Street

- Location within Lincolnshire
- Population: 223 (2011)
- OS grid reference: SK985594
  - London: 110 mi (180 km) S
- District: North Kesteven
- Shire county: Lincolnshire
- Region: East Midlands
- Country: England
- Sovereign state: United Kingdom
- Post town: Lincoln
- Postcode district: LN5
- Police: Lincolnshire
- Fire: Lincolnshire
- Ambulance: East Midlands
- UK Parliament: Sleaford and North Hykeham

Boothby Graffoe is a village and civil parish in the North Kesteven district of Lincolnshire, England. The population of the civil parish at the 2011 census was 223. It is situated approximately 7 miles (10 km) south from the city and county town of Lincoln, and on the A607 Ermine Street Roman road.

Boothby Graffoe Grade II listed Anglican parish church is dedicated to St Andrew The church was re-built in 1842. According to the parish registers of Wellingore, Boothby Graffoe's original church was destroyed by a T8-9 tornado (the strongest ever recorded in England) in 1666.

To the west of the village lies the earthwork remains of Somerton Castle.

== See also ==
- Spring line settlement
- Boothby Graffoe (Comedian)
