= Grade I listed buildings in South Kesteven =

There are over 9,000 Grade I listed buildings in England. This page is a list of these buildings in the district of South Kesteven in Lincolnshire.

== South Kesteven ==
Name	Location	Type	Completed (Note: The date given is the date used by Historic England as significant for the initial building or that of an important part in the structure's description.)	Date designated	Grid ref. (Note: The grid reference is based on the British national grid reference system, sometimes known as OSGB36, used by the Ordnance Survey.) Geo-coordinates	Entry number (Note: The "List Entry Number" is a unique number assigned to each listed building and scheduled monument by Historic England.)	Image
Church of St Martin	Ancaster	Church	Saxon	20 September 1966	SK9827043573; 52°58′50″N 0°32′16″W	1062422	Church of St Martin More images
Aslackby Manor House	Aslackby and Laughton	Hall House	16th century	30 October 1968	TF0841630413; 52°51′37″N 0°23′28″W	1062750	Aslackby Manor House More images
Church of St James	Aslackby and Laughton	Church	c. 1300	30 October 1968	TF0853730394; 52°51′36″N 0°23′22″W	1062757	Church of St James More images
Church of St Martin	Barholm and Stowe	Parish Church	11th century	30 October 1968	TF0900610976; 52°41′08″N 0°23′20″W	1360165	Church of St Martin More images
Church of St Nicholas	Barkston	Parish Church	12th century	20 September 1955	SK9329041524; 52°57′47″N 0°36′45″W	1317449	Church of St Nicholas More images
Church of All Saints	Barrowby	Parish Church	13th century	20 September 1966	SK8786436492; 52°55′07″N 0°41′41″W	1194848	Church of All Saints More images
Church of St. John the Baptist	Baston	Parish Church	Early 13th century	30 October 1968	TF1137713982; 52°42′43″N 0°21′10″W	1062701	Church of St. John the Baptist More images
Belton House	Belton Park, Belton and Manthorpe	Country House	1685-1688	19 February 1952	SK9298139300; 52°56′35″N 0°37′04″W	1235523	Belton House More images
Church of Saint Peter and Saint Paul	Belton, Belton and Manthorpe	Parish Church	c. 1200	20 September 1951	SK9298339533; 52°56′43″N 0°37′04″W	1298472	Church of Saint Peter and Saint Paul More images
Stables to Belton Park	Belton Park, Belton and Manthorpe	Tea Room	1994	19 February 1952	SK9285939394; 52°56′38″N 0°37′10″W	1235620	Stables to Belton Park More images
Church of St. Andrew	Billingborough	Church	c. 1300	30 October 1968	TF1178834244; 52°53′39″N 0°20′23″W	1317596	Church of St. Andrew More images
Church of St Mary Magdalene	Lower Bitchfield, Bitchfield and Bassingthorpe	Parish Church	11th century	20 September 1966	SK9830528397; 52°50′39″N 0°32′31″W	1062863	Church of St Mary Magdalene More images
Church of St Thomas a Becket	Bassingthorpe, Bitchfield and Bassingthorpe	Parish Church	Mid-12th century	20 September 1966	SK9660628539; 52°50′45″N 0°34′01″W	1062858	Church of St Thomas a Becket More images
The Manor House	Bassingthorpe, Bitchfield and Bassingthorpe	House	C20	19 February 1952	SK9878728730; 52°50′49″N 0°32′05″W	1062860	The Manor House More images
Boothby Manor House	Boothby Pagnell	Manor House	Late 12th century	20 September 1966	SK9705430670; 52°51′53″N 0°33′35″W	1360056	Boothby Manor House More images
Church of St. Andrew	Boothby Pagnell	Parish Church	Early 12th century	20 September 1966	SK9718330833; 52°51′58″N 0°33′28″W	1062868	Church of St. Andrew More images
Parish Church of St Peter and St Paul	Bourne	Church	Possibly pre 1138	2 May 1949	TF0969219985; 52°45′59″N 0°22′32″W	1260249	Parish Church of St Peter and St Paul More images
Church of St. Margaret	Braceborough and Wilsthorpe	Parish Church	14th century	30 October 1968	TF0825013297; 52°42′23″N 0°23′57″W	1360151	Church of St. Margaret More images
Church of St Thomas a Becket	Burton Coggles	Parish Church	12th century	20 September 1966	SK9796925839; 52°49′16″N 0°32′51″W	1317197	Church of St Thomas a Becket More images
Church of St. Stephen	Careby, Careby Aunby and Holywell	Parish Church	12th century	30 October 1968	TF0257016482; 52°44′11″N 0°28′56″W	1360059	Church of St. Stephen More images
Church of St. Stephen	Carlby	Parish Church	c. 1200	30 October 1968	TF0496913894; 52°42′45″N 0°26′51″W	1360153	Church of St. Stephen More images
Church of St Nicholas	Carlton Scroop	Parish Church	12th century	20 September 1966	SK9476445005; 52°59′38″N 0°35′23″W	1062428	Church of St Nicholas More images
Church of St James	Castle Bytham	Church	Early 13th century	30 October 1968	SK9886218348; 52°45′13″N 0°32′12″W	1360095	Church of St James More images
Church of St Vincent	Caythorpe	Parish Church	13th century	20 September 1966	SK9389448566; 53°01′34″N 0°36′05″W	1317320	Church of St Vincent More images
Church of St. Peter	Claypole	Parish Church	c. 1300	20 September 1966	SK8456048994; 53°01′54″N 0°44′26″W	1062912	Church of St. Peter More images
Church of St John the Baptist	Colsterworth	Church	11th century	20 September 1966	SK9302724155; 52°48′25″N 0°37′17″W	1360309	Church of St John the Baptist More images
Woolsthorpe Manor House	Woolsthorpe-by-Colsterworth, Colsterworth	Farmhouse	Early 17th century	19 February 1952	SK9240924399; 52°48′33″N 0°37′50″W	1062362	Woolsthorpe Manor House More images
Church of St John	Corby Glen	Parish Church	12th century	30 October 1968	TF0013625002; 52°48′48″N 0°30′57″W	1309158	Church of St John More images
Willoughby Memorial Library and Art Gallery	Corby Glen	School	1669	6 May 1956	SK9997524876; 52°48′44″N 0°31′05″W	1062848	Willoughby Memorial Library and Art Gallery More images
Church of St Peter	Counthorpe and Creeton	Parish Church	Late 12th century	30 October 1968	TF0145719880; 52°46′01″N 0°29′52″W	1166154	Church of St Peter More images
Cross Shaft on south side of Church of St. Peter, 6m from South Doorway	Counthorpe and Creeton	Cross	10th century	15 December 1986	TF0145219872; 52°46′01″N 0°29′52″W	1062822	Cross Shaft on south side of Church of St. Peter, 6m from South Doorway More images
Cross Shaft on West Side of Church of St. Peter, 12m North-west of Tower	Counthorpe and Creeton	Cross	10th century	15 December 1986	TF0143719883; 52°46′01″N 0°29′53″W	1166266	Cross Shaft on West Side of Church of St. Peter, 12m North-west of Tower More images
3 Table Tombs 6m from South Side of Church of St.james	Deeping St. James	Table Tomb	Mid-18th century	22 June 1987	TF1575309577; 52°40′18″N 0°17′22″W	1164988	Upload Photo
Church of St. James	Deeping St. James	Church	18th century	30 October 1968	TF1575109592; 52°40′18″N 0°17′23″W	1062680	Church of St. James More images
Village Cross	Deeping St. James, South Kesteven	Village Cross	15th century	30 October 1968	TF1581709486; 52°40′15″N 0°17′19″W	1062681	Village Cross More images
Church of St Andrew	Denton	Parish Church	c. 1200	20 September 1966	SK8654432515; 52°52′59″N 0°42′55″W	1062370	Church of St Andrew More images
Gateway (known as Inigo Jones Gateway) 90m South East of Denton Manor, in Denton Park	Denton	Gate	Mid-17th century	21 September 1979	SK8619732397; 52°52′56″N 0°43′14″W	1360336	Gateway (known as Inigo Jones Gateway) 90m South East of Denton Manor, in Denton Park More images
Church of All Saints	Dunsby	Church	Early 12th century	30 October 1968	TF1052126821; 52°49′39″N 0°21′40″W	1165123	Church of All Saints More images
Church of St Mary and St Andrew	Stoke Rochford, Easton	Parish Church	11th century	20 September 1966	SK9205227351; 52°50′09″N 0°38′06″W	1147858	Church of St Mary and St Andrew More images
Church of St Michael and All Angels	Edenham	Parish Church	C8, C12, C13, C15, early C16, 1808	30 October 1968	TF0621021829; 52°47′01″N 0°25′36″W	1146587	Church of St Michael and All Angels More images
Grimsthorpe Castle and North Court	Grimsthorpe Park, Edenham	Castle	Medieval	6 May 1952	TF0445622778; 52°47′33″N 0°27′09″W	1062823	Grimsthorpe Castle and North Court More images
Church of All Saints	Fenton	Parish Church	12th century	20 September 1966	SK8785250686; 53°02′46″N 0°41′28″W	1062914	Church of All Saints More images
Church of St. Andrew	Folkingham	Church	Late 12th century	30 October 1968	TF0712633731; 52°53′25″N 0°24′33″W	1062733	Church of St. Andrew More images
Church of St. Peter	Foston	Parish Church	Late 12th century	20 September 1966	SK8586742963; 52°58′38″N 0°43′22″W	1360062	Church of St. Peter More images
Church of St Nicholas	Fulbeck	Parish Church	10th century	20 September 1966	SK9475650438; 53°02′34″N 0°35′17″W	1166164	Church of St Nicholas More images
Church of St Sebastian	Great Gonerby	Parish Church	c. 1200	20 September 1966	SK8978438117; 52°55′59″N 0°39′56″W	1062882	Church of St Sebastian More images
Church of the Holy Cross	Great Ponton	Parish Church	Late 13th century	20 September 1966	SK9249030473; 52°51′50″N 0°37′39″W	1062347	Church of the Holy Cross More images
Church of St. Thomas a Becket	Greatford	Parish Church	11th century	30 October 1968	TF0860611964; 52°41′40″N 0°23′40″W	1317480	Church of St. Thomas a Becket More images
Church of St. Andrew	Haconby	Church	Late 12th century	30 October 1968	TF1067225262; 52°48′49″N 0°21′34″W	1360134	Church of St. Andrew More images
St Mary and St Peter’s Church	Harlaxton	Parish Church	Late 12th century	20 September 1966	SK8826832644; 52°53′02″N 0°41′23″W	1187962	St Mary and St Peter’s Church More images
Forecourt Gateway and Screen at Harlaxton Manor	Harlaxton	Gate	c1840-1854	19 February 1952	SK8946132325; 52°52′51″N 0°40′19″W	1236557	Forecourt Gateway and Screen at Harlaxton Manor
Harlaxton Manor	Harlaxton	Country House	1832-1844	19 February 1952	SK8953432282; 52°52′50″N 0°40′16″W	1298440	Harlaxton Manor More images
Walls Steps and Gazebos to South West of Forecourt at Harlaxton Manor	Harlaxton	Balustrade	c1838-1854	24 September 1979	SK8947532277; 52°52′50″N 0°40′19″W	1187969	Walls Steps and Gazebos to South West of Forecourt at Harlaxton Manor More images
Church of St Michael	Heydour	Parish Church	12th century	20 September 1966	TF0096739618; 52°56′40″N 0°29′56″W	1166347	Church of St Michael More images
Church of St Wilfrid	Honington	Parish Church	11th century	20 September 1966	SK9432643390; 52°58′46″N 0°35′48″W	1062413	Church of St Wilfrid More images
Church of St. Andrew	Horbling	Church	c. 1170	30 October 1968	TF1188735179; 52°54′09″N 0°20′17″W	1165999	Church of St. Andrew More images
Church of All Saints	Hougham	Church	11th century	20 September 1966	SK8866044221; 52°59′17″N 0°40′51″W	1062889	Church of All Saints More images
Church of All Saints	Hough-on-the-Hill	Parish Church	11th century	20 September 1966	SK9232346406; 53°00′25″N 0°37′32″W	1360316	Church of All Saints More images
Church of St Bartholomew	Ingoldsby	Parish Church	12th century	20 September 1966	TF0102230064; 52°51′31″N 0°30′04″W	1146549	Church of St Bartholomew More images
Church of St Andrew	Irnham	Parish Church	12th century	30 October 1968	TF0234726675; 52°49′40″N 0°28′57″W	1308771	Church of St Andrew More images
Irnham Hall	Irnham	Country House	c. 1200	6 May 1952	TF0229626642; 52°49′39″N 0°28′59″W	1146898	Irnham Hall More images
Church of St Mary and All Saints	Kirkby Underwood	Church	11th century	30 October 1968	TF0698127045; 52°49′49″N 0°24′49″W	1166122	Church of St Mary and All Saints More images
Church of St. Michael	Langtoft	Parish Church	Early 13th century	30 October 1968	TF1234112552; 52°41′56″N 0°20′20″W	1062653	Church of St. Michael More images
Church of St Peter	Lenton, Lenton, Keisby and Osgodby	Parish Church	13th century	20 September 1966	TF0258830351; 52°51′39″N 0°28′40″W	1253206	Church of St Peter More images
Church of St Medard and St Gildard	Little Bytham	Church	Early 13th century	30 October 1968	TF0129318036; 52°45′02″N 0°30′03″W	1062772	Church of St Medard and St Gildard More images
Church of St Guthlac	Little Ponton, Little Ponton and Stroxton	Parish Church	11th century	20 September 1966	SK9248732234; 52°52′47″N 0°37′38″W	1062312	Church of St Guthlac More images
South Gates to Belton Park	Londonthorpe, Londonthorpe and Harrowby Without	Gate	Early 18th century	20 September 1966	SK9259937812; 52°55′47″N 0°37′26″W	1261877	South Gates to Belton Park More images
Church of St Swithin	Long Bennington	Parish Church	Early 13th century	20 September 1966	SK8436143883; 52°59′08″N 0°44′41″W	1062891	Church of St Swithin More images
Church of St. Guthlac	Market Deeping	Church	1710	30 October 1968	TF1368210312; 52°40′43″N 0°19′12″W	1165217	Church of St. Guthlac More images
The Old Rectory and the East Wing	Market Deeping	House	Mid-18th century	6 May 1952	TF1372310329; 52°40′43″N 0°19′10″W	1062659	Upload Photo
Church of St. Mary	Marston	Parish Church	c. 1175	20 September 1966	SK8928643719; 52°59′00″N 0°40′18″W	1146946	Church of St. Mary More images
Church of St John the Baptist	Morton and Hanthorpe	Church	Mid-12th century	30 October 1968	TF0982624010; 52°48′09″N 0°22′20″W	1166383	Church of St John the Baptist More images
Church of St Mary	North Witham	Church	11th century	20 September 1966	SK9280521870; 52°47′11″N 0°37′31″W	1360327	Church of St Mary More images
Church of St Andrew	Pickworth	Parish Church	12th century	20 September 1984	TF0441633679; 52°53′26″N 0°26′58″W	1253286	Church of St Andrew More images
Church of St Andrew	Sempringham, Pointon and Sempringham	Parish Church	c. 1170	30 October 1968	TF1065232896; 52°52′56″N 0°21′26″W	1241280	Church of St Andrew More images
Church of St Andrew	Rippingale	Church	Mid-13th century	30 October 1968	TF0978027815; 52°50′12″N 0°22′18″W	1260603	Church of St Andrew More images
Church of St Peter	Ropsley, Ropsley and Humby	Parish Church	11th century	20 September 1984	SK9926834220; 52°53′47″N 0°31′33″W	1261821	Church of St Peter More images
Church of Saint Lawrence	Sedgebrook	Parish Church	Early 13th century	20 September 1966	SK8575738095; 52°56′00″N 0°43′32″W	1236949	Church of Saint Lawrence More images
Church of St James	Skillington	Parish Church	11th century	20 September 1966	SK8955425898; 52°49′23″N 0°40′21″W	1168300	Church of St James More images
Church of St John the Baptist	South Witham	Parish Church	Late 12th century	20 September 1966	SK9271819409; 52°45′52″N 0°37′38″W	1062325	Church of St John the Baptist More images
Bastion	Stamford	Bastion	Medieval	22 May 1954	TF0251006974; 52°39′03″N 0°29′10″W	1360072	Bastion More images
Brazenose College Gate. Retaining Walls of College.	Stamford	Gate	14th century	22 May 1954	TF0337907358; 52°39′15″N 0°28′23″W	1360017	Brazenose College Gate. Retaining Walls of College. More images
Church of All Saints	Stamford	Church	12th century	22 May 1954	TF0285207154; 52°39′09″N 0°28′52″W	1062310	Church of All Saints More images
Church of St George	Stamford	Church	12th century	22 May 1954	TF0320307083; 52°39′06″N 0°28′33″W	1168674	Church of St George More images
Church of St John the Baptist	Stamford	Church	pre-C15	22 May 1954	TF0292607086; 52°39′06″N 0°28′48″W	1360419	Church of St John the Baptist More images
Church of St Martin	Stamford	Church	c1482-1485	22 May 1954	TF0311206788; 52°38′57″N 0°28′38″W	1169102	Church of St Martin More images
Church of St Mary	Stamford	Church	By 12th century	22 May 1954	TF0304307054; 52°39′05″N 0°28′42″W	1062961	Church of St Mary More images
Remains of St Leonard's Priory	Stamford	Benedictine Monastery	c. 1090	22 May 1954	TF0389007372; 52°39′15″N 0°27′56″W	1062210	Remains of St Leonard's Priory More images
Ornamental Archway 250m South West from Stoke Rochford Hall	Stoke Rochford Park, Stoke Rochford	Arch	1676	14 July 1978	SK9169927692; 52°50′20″N 0°38′24″W	1168574	Ornamental Archway 250m South West from Stoke Rochford Hall More images
Ornamental Archway, 350m South of Stoke Rochford Hall	Stoke Rochford Park, Stoke Rochford	Arch	1676	14 July 1978	SK9193027596; 52°50′17″N 0°38′12″W	1168585	Ornamental Archway, 350m South of Stoke Rochford Hall More images
Seats, Balustrades and Terraces to East of Stoke Rochford Hall	Stoke Rochford Park, Stoke Rochford	Terrace	1841-5	9 January 1987	SK9187828073; 52°50′32″N 0°38′14″W	1360353	Upload Photo
Stoke Rochford Hall	Stoke Rochford Park, Stoke Rochford	Country House	1841-5	14 July 1978	SK9183628061; 52°50′32″N 0°38′17″W	1306963	Stoke Rochford Hall More images
Church of St. Mary	Swinstead	Parish Church	c. 1200	30 October 1968	TF0186022454; 52°47′24″N 0°29′27″W	1360128	Church of St. Mary More images
Summer House	Swinstead	Summerhouse	c. 1720	15 December 1986	TF0216022469; 52°47′24″N 0°29′11″W	1062789	Summer House More images
Church of St. Lawrence	Tallington	Parish Church	Mid-12th century	30 October 1968	TF0913707859; 52°39′27″N 0°23′17″W	1360195	Church of St. Lawrence More images
Church of St Firmin	Thurlby	Parish Church	11th century	30 October 1968	TF1050516802; 52°44′15″N 0°21′53″W	1062615	Church of St Firmin More images
Casewick Hall	Casewick, Uffington, South Kesteven	House	Md	6 May 1952	TF0768309015; 52°40′05″N 0°24′33″W	1165624	Casewick Hall More images
Church of St Michael and All Angels	Uffington	Parish Church	c. 1200	30 October 1968	TF0615507743; 52°39′25″N 0°25′55″W	1062590	Church of St Michael and All Angels More images
Church of St Bartholomew	Welby	Parish Church	13th century	20 September 1966	SK9754038184; 52°55′56″N 0°33′01″W	1253411	Church of St Bartholomew More images
Church of St Andrew	West Deeping	Parish Church	Early 13th century	30 October 1968	TF1090308623; 52°39′50″N 0°21′42″W	1165761	Church of St Andrew More images
Church of All Saints	Westborough, Westborough and Dry Doddington	Parish Church	11th century	20 September 1966	SK8501744299; 52°59′21″N 0°44′06″W	1253495	Church of All Saints More images
Church of St Andrew	Witham on the Hill	Parish Church	12th century	30 October 1968	TF0529716589; 52°44′12″N 0°26′31″W	1240073	Church of St Andrew More images
Angel and Royal	Grantham	Coaching Inn	Late 14th century	8 May 1950	SK9136835966; 52°54′48″N 0°38′34″W	1062486	Angel and Royal More images
Extensions of Angel and Royal Hotel on North Side of Front Block	Grantham	Inn	18th century	20 April 1972	SK9136435979; 52°54′49″N 0°38′34″W	1360252	Upload Photo
Church of St Wulfram	Grantham	Parish Church and Chained Library	10th century	8 May 1950	SK9149836145; 52°54′54″N 0°38′27″W	1062501	Church of St Wulfram More images
Grantham House	Grantham	House	14th century	8 May 1950	SK9155136151; 52°54′54″N 0°38′24″W	1062508	Grantham House More images
Stable Buildings to Grantham House	Grantham	Stable	Late 16th century	8 May 1950	SK9153436181; 52°54′55″N 0°38′25″W	1360263	Stable Buildings to Grantham House More images
King's School ('Old School' fronting Church Street)	Grantham	School	1497	8 May 1950	SK9148936190; 52°54′55″N 0°38′27″W	1360231	King's School ('Old School' fronting Church Street) More images
School House (Headmaster's Residence)	Grantham	Privy House	Medieval	8 May 1950	SK9147936216; 52°54′56″N 0°38′28″W	1062519	School House (Headmaster's Residence) More images
