= St Nicholas' Church, Fulbeck =

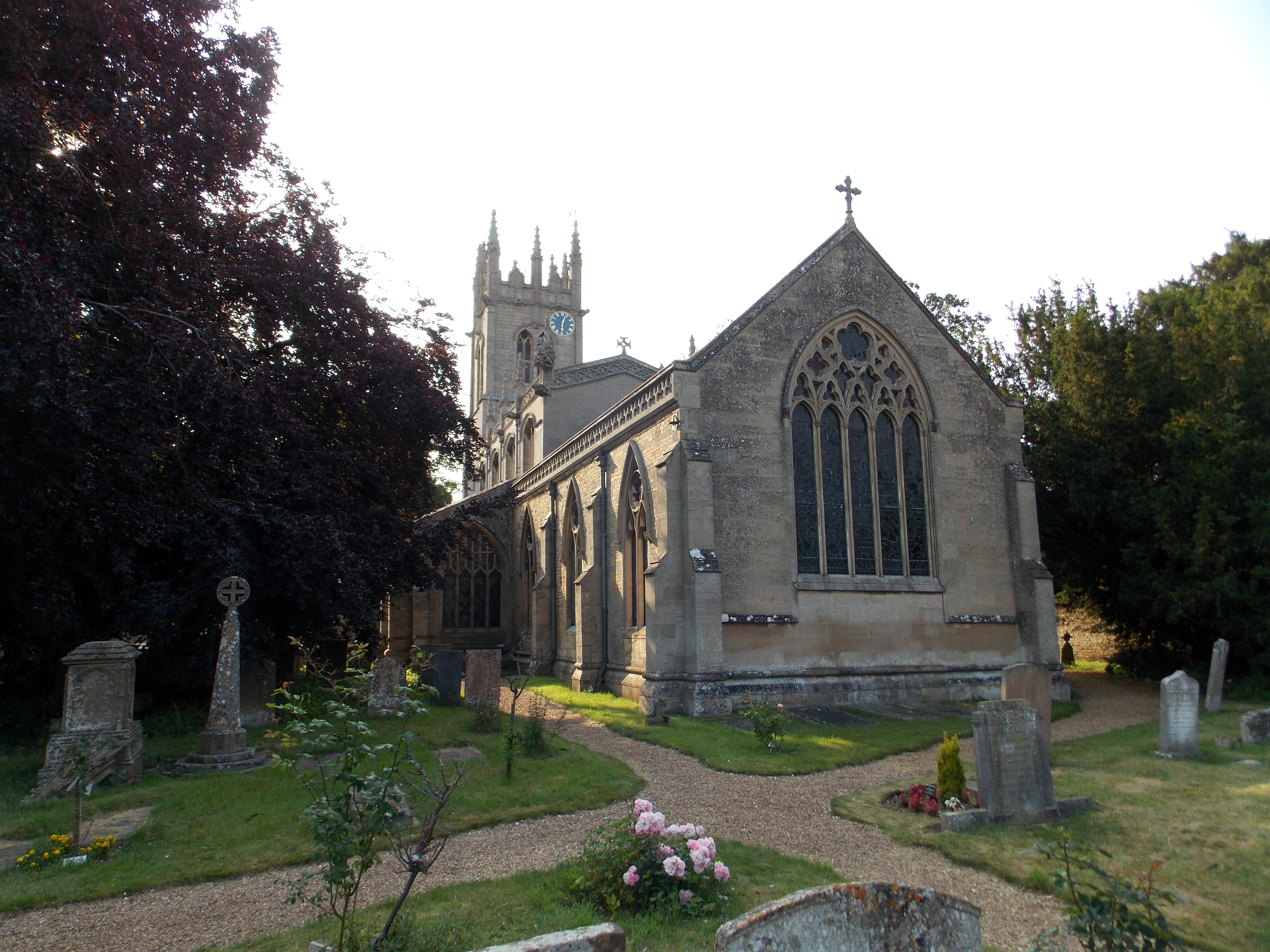
- Church of St Nicholas, Fulbeck
- St Nicholas' Church, Fulbeck
- 53.042864°N 0.58816078°W
- OS grid reference: SK 94756 50438
- Country: England
- Denomination: Church of England

History
- Founded: 10th-century
- Dedication: Saint Nicholas

Architecture
- Heritage designation: Grade I
- Designated: 20 September 1966
- Architectural type: Norman, Perpendicular

Specifications
- Materials: limestone, rubble

Administration
- Province: Canterbury
- Diocese: Diocese of Lincoln
- Deanery: Deanery of Loveden
- Parish: Fulbeck

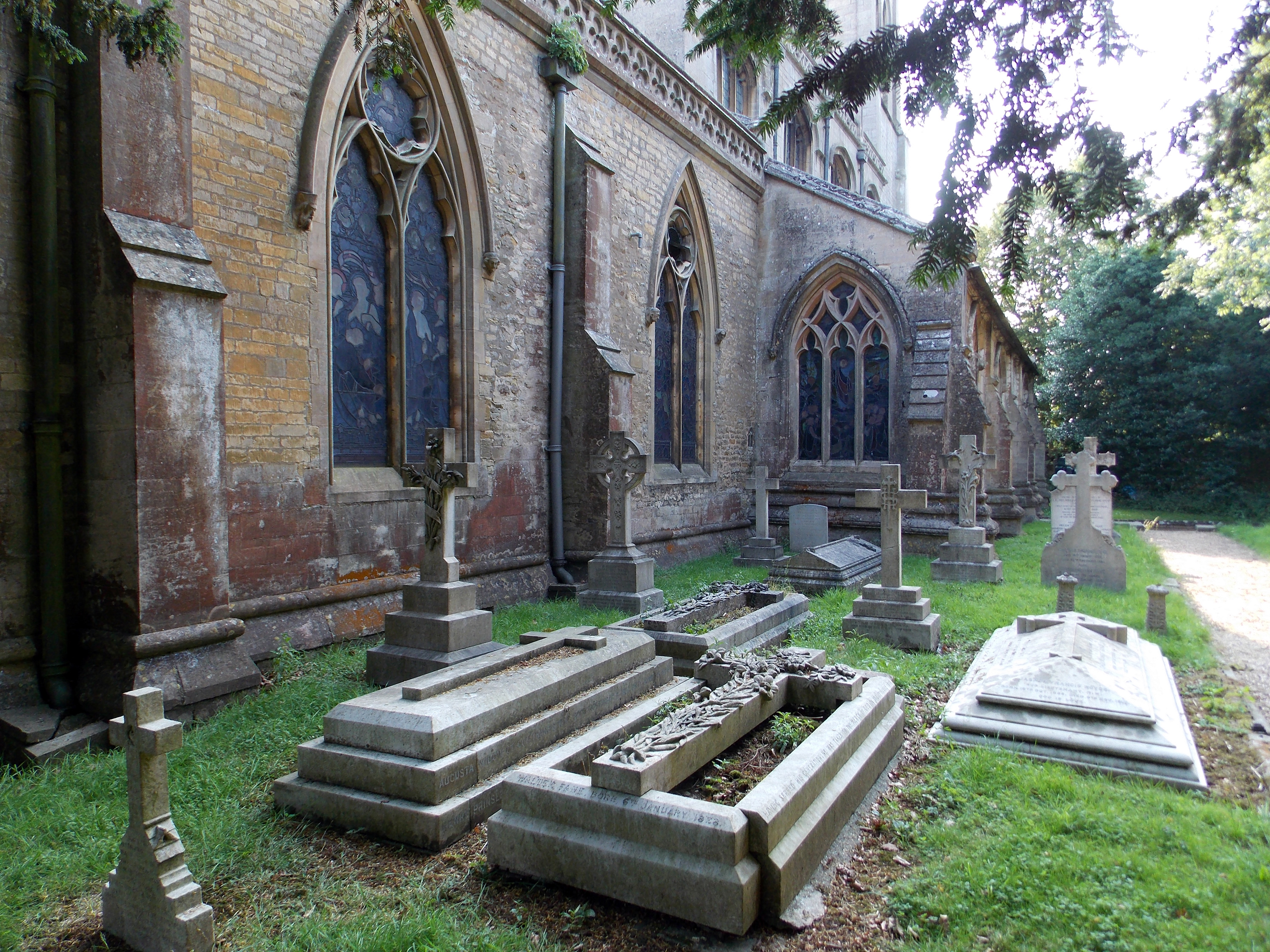
Fane family plot

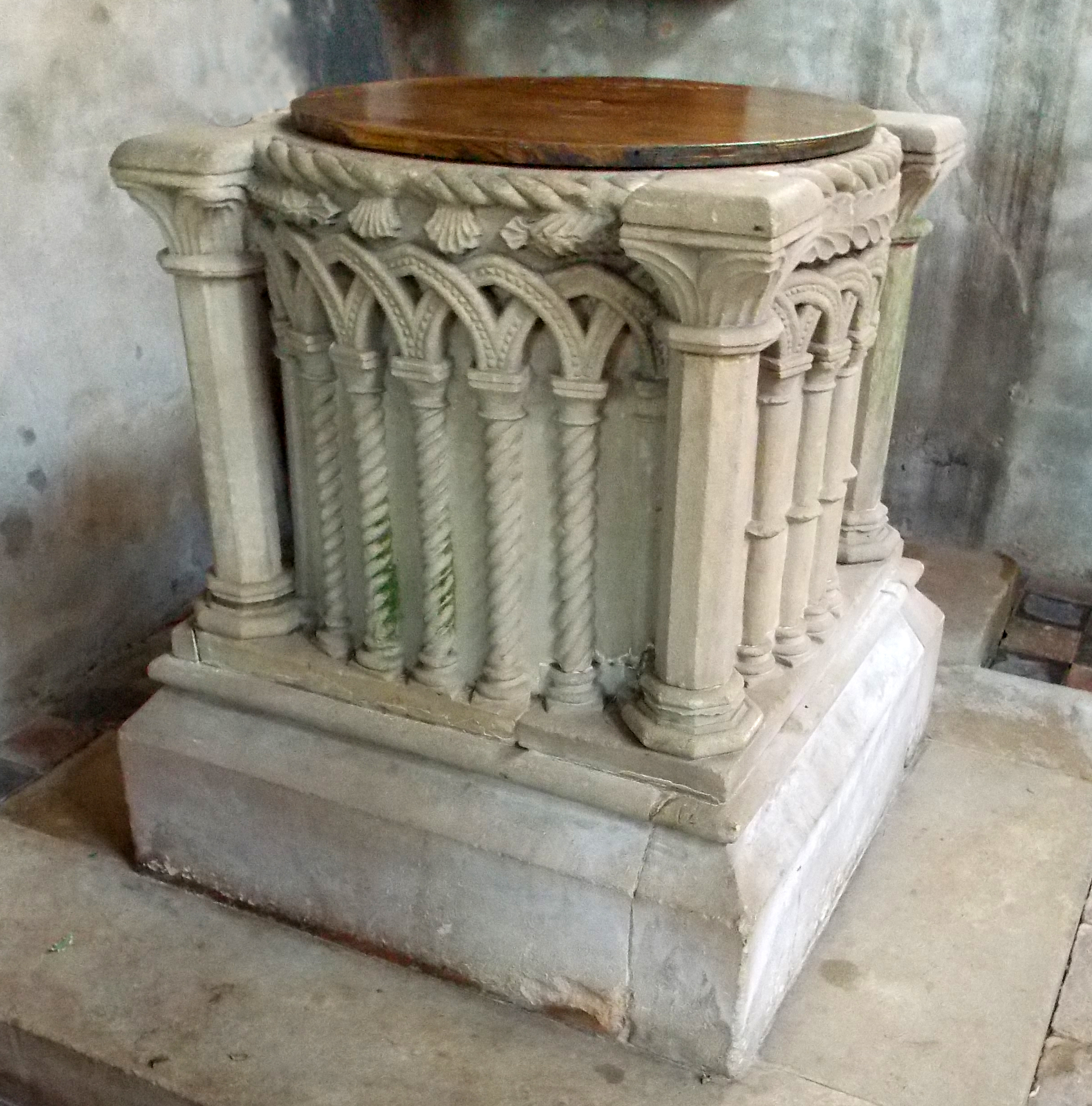
Baptismal font – 12th-century

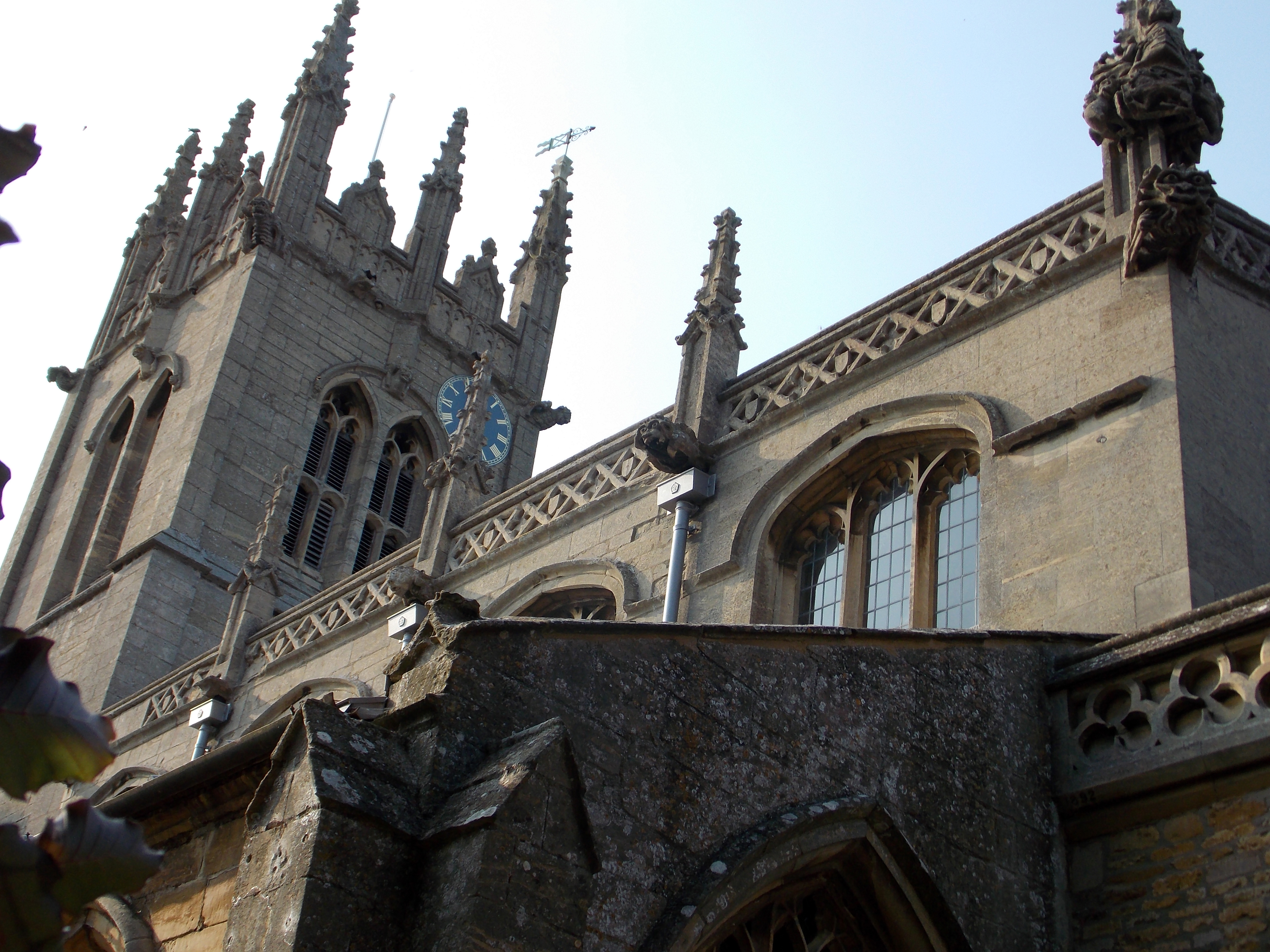
Clerestory and tower from the south-east corner

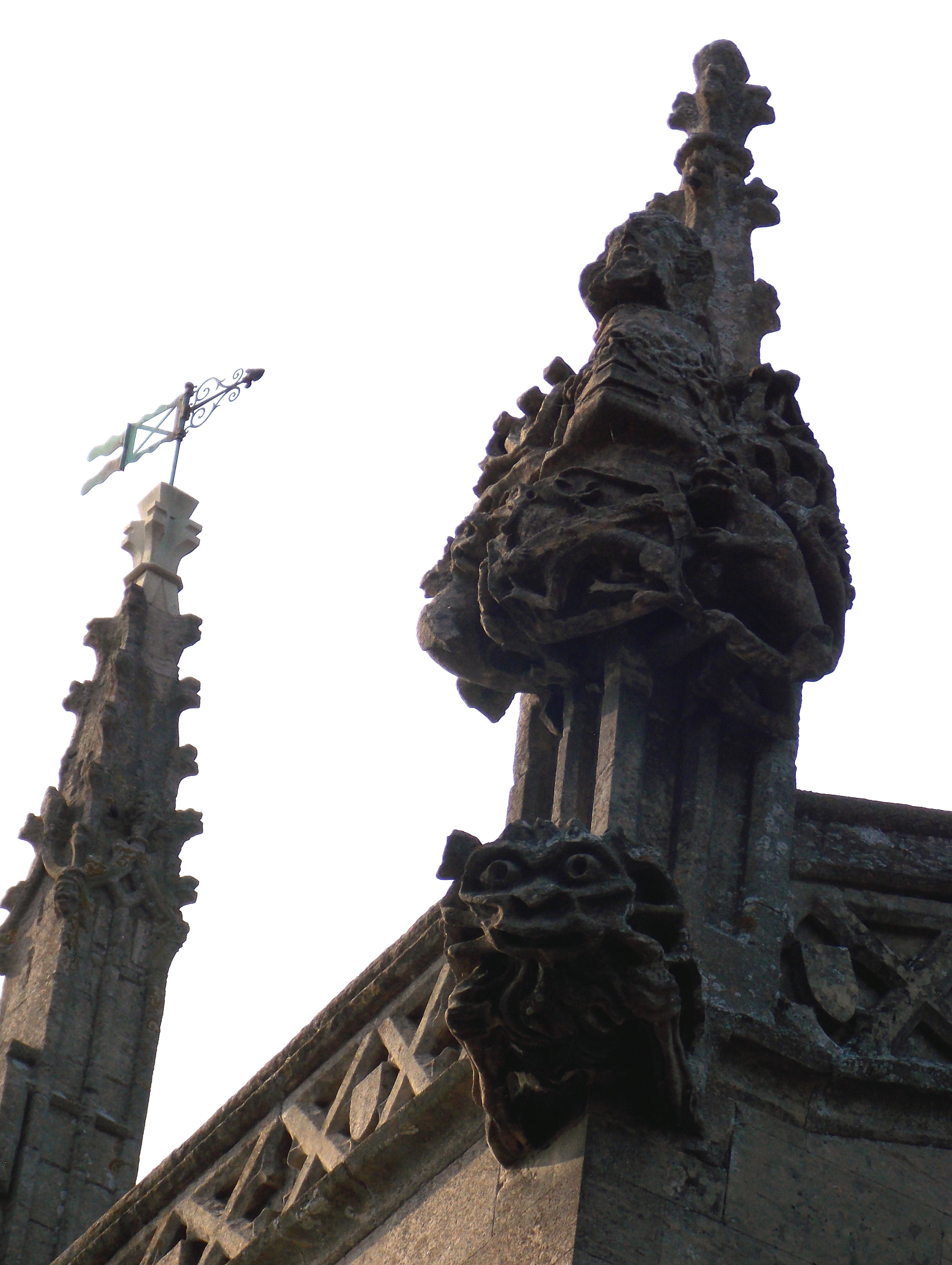
Myddleton family arms on the pinnacle at the south-east of the nave

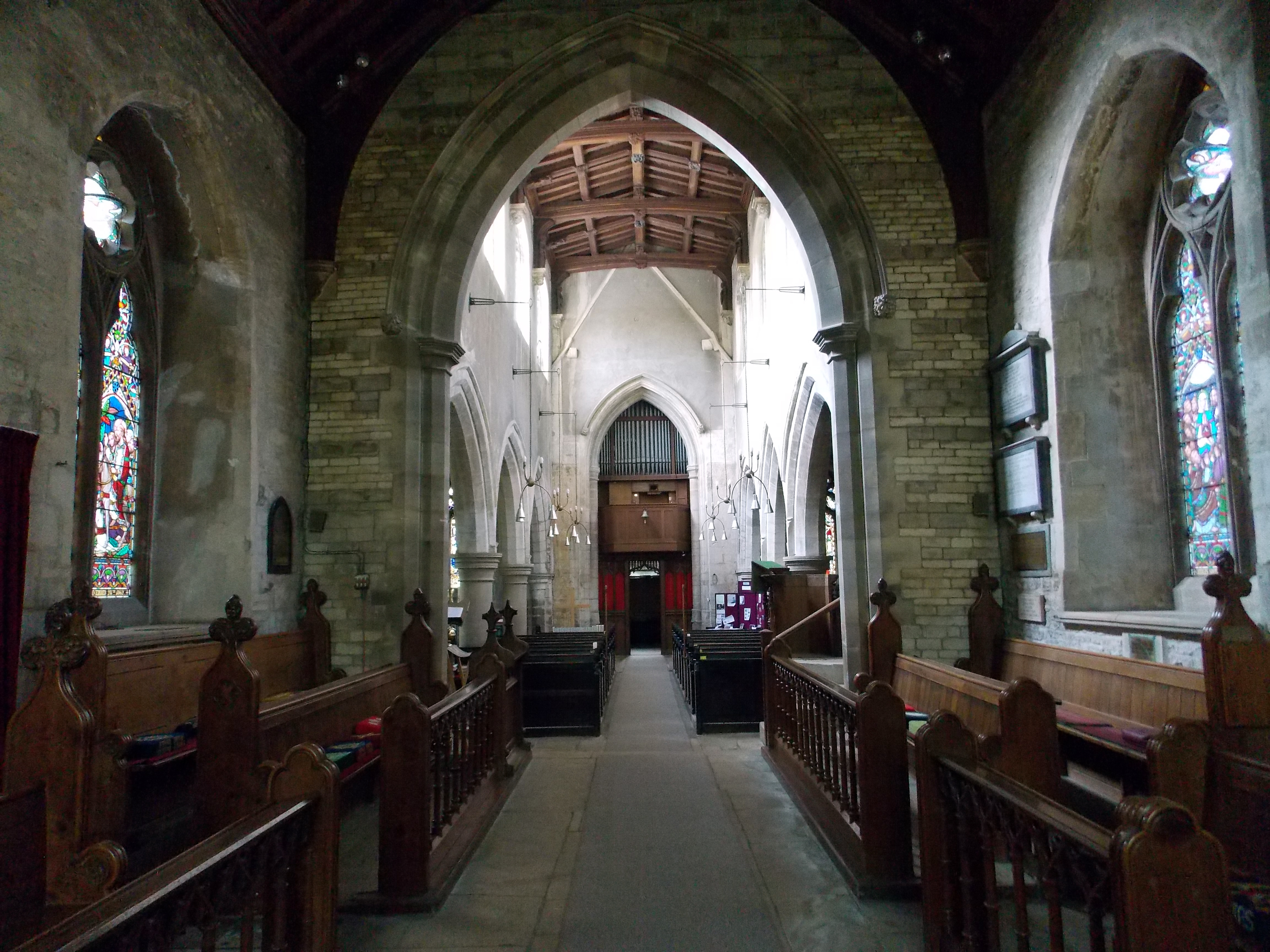
Chancel and nave from the east

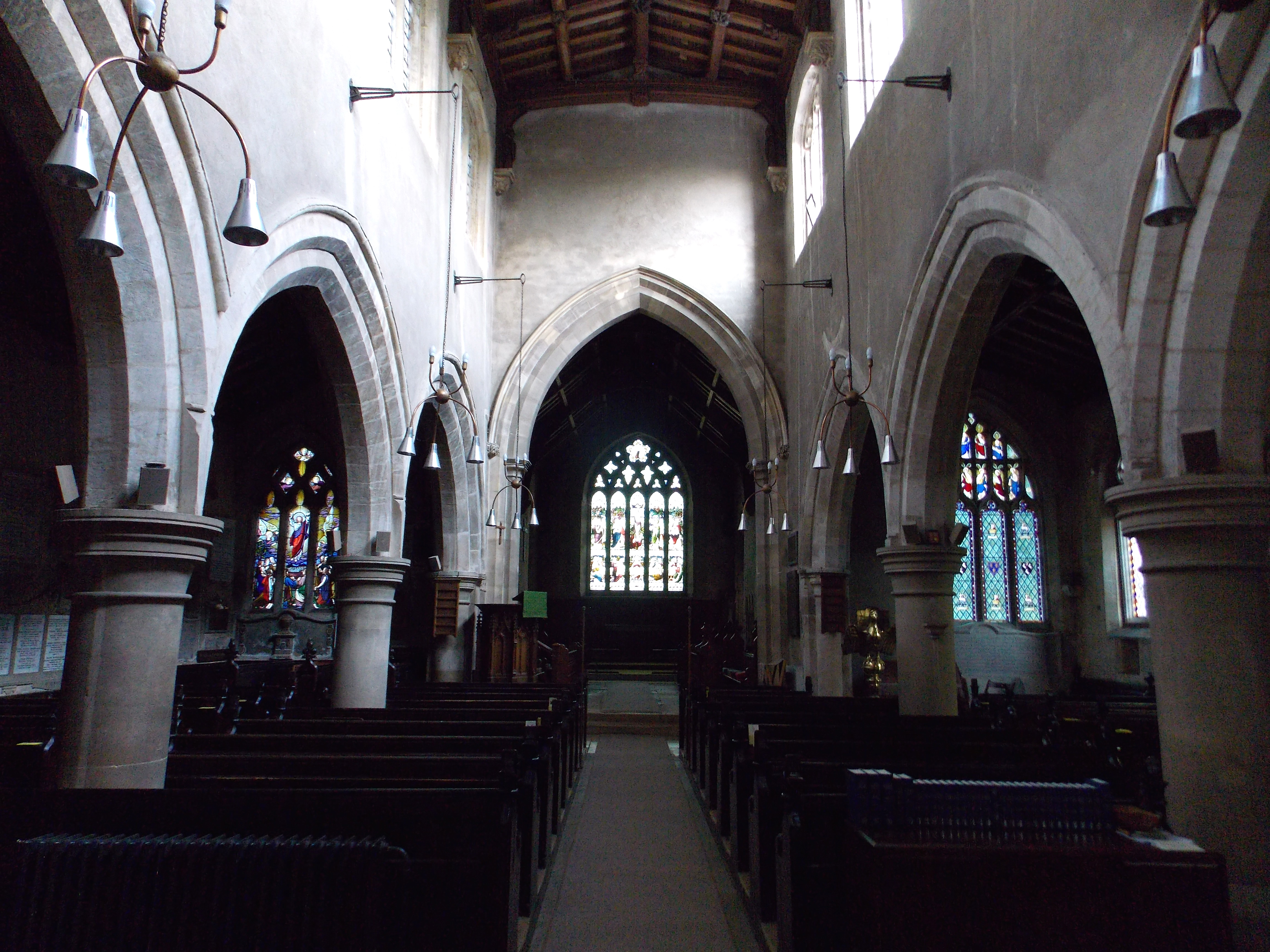
Nave and chancel from the west

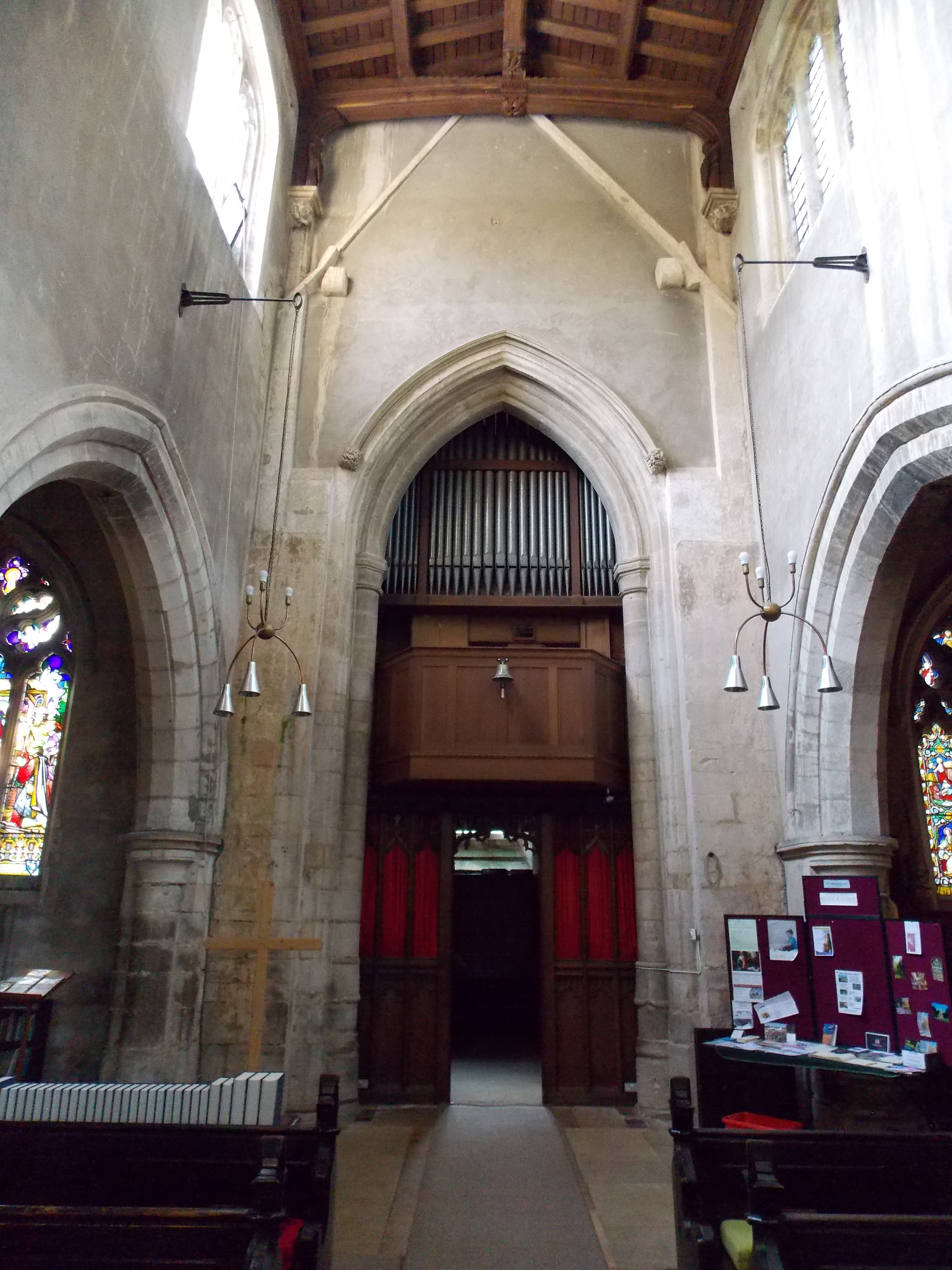
Tower arch showing roof line of the earlier Saxon nave

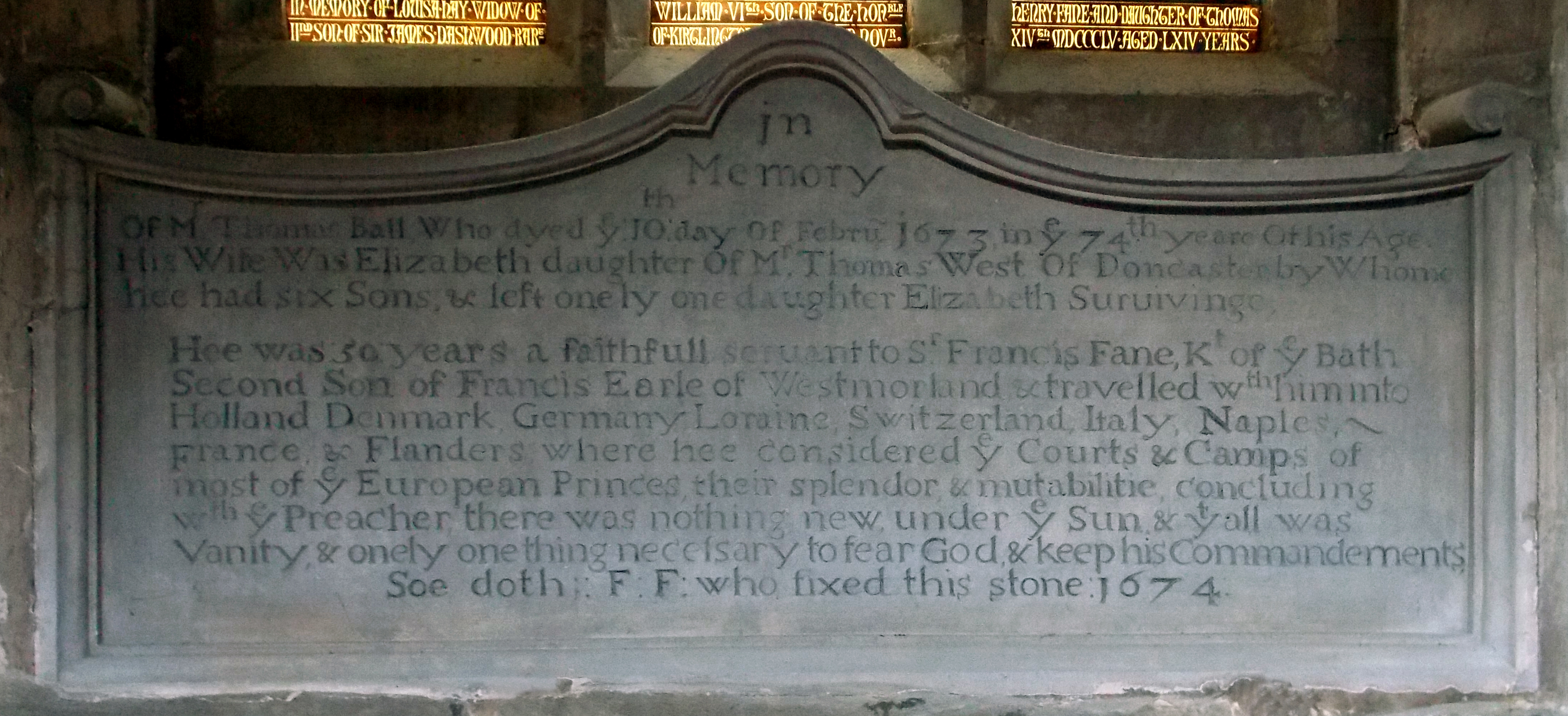
Memorial to Thomas Ball

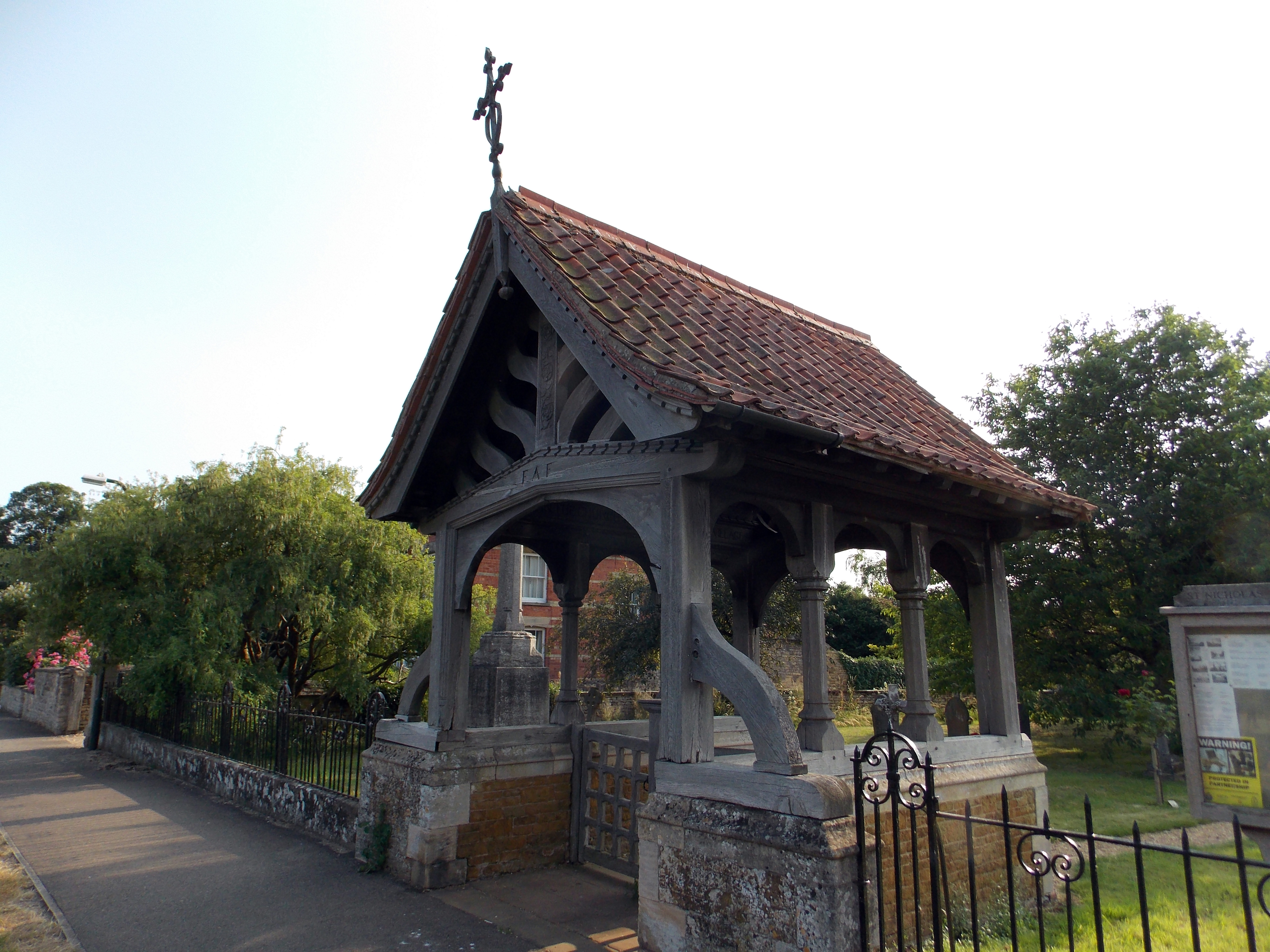
Lychgate

St Nicholas' Church is a Grade I listed Church of England parish church dedicated to Saint Nicholas, in Fulbeck, Lincolnshire, England. The church is 9 miles (14 km) north from Grantham, and at the southern edge of the Lincoln Cliff in South Kesteven.

St Nicholas' is noted in particular for its association with and memorials to the Fane family of Fulbeck Hall, and its Transitional period font.

The church is within the Fulbeck conservation area. It is in the ecclesiastical parish of Fulbeck, and is part of the Caythorpe Group of churches in the Deanery of Loveden and the Diocese of Lincoln. Other churches in the same group are St Vincent's at Caythorpe, and St Nicholas' at Carlton Scroop with Normanton.

== History ==
There were two churches and two priests at Fulbeck in the 11th century, recorded in the 1086 Domesday Book.

The present church was subject to a major restoration of 1887–88 by Charles Kirk, in Norman and Perpendicular style at a cost of £1,350. This included a new chancel arch and the enlargement of the chancel east window. Major rebuilding of the chancel had taken place in 1871, and between 1853 and 1858 new pews were added and the pillars restored. Of the earlier 9th- to early 13th-century church only small parts remain, particularly at the base of the chancel and tower. Restorations were carried out in the 14th and 15th century. In the 14th, aisles were replaced, with north and south doorways and a porch added—these remained after the Victorian restoration. In the 15th, the sides of the nave were raised by the use of a flat lead roof supported by a new clerestory—the previous roof had been steeply pitched.

The parish register dates from 1565. The earliest record of a Church of England rector at Fulbeck is of Alexandri Seyton in 1542. In 1834 the patronage for the church rectory, listed with a value of £20 15s. 7d., was provided by Colonel Henry Fane, son of General Sir Henry Fane GCB. It had remained in Colonel Fane's gift by 1855, when the incumbent was the Rev'd Edward Fane, MA, [until 1863] with a yearly modus—a payment in lieu of tithes—of £563 10s. and 50 acres (0.20 km^{2}) of glebe land. The Rev'd Vere Francis Wilson MA, of Emmanuel College, Cambridge became parish priest in 1884, with glebe and commuted tithes amounting to £470, in the gift of Lt-Col Mildmay W. Willson. From 1912 [until 1952] the Rev'd Henry Carrington Fanshawe Bingham BA, of Sidney Sussex College, Cambridge was the incumbent, with his living in the gift of Francis Christopher Fane.

Harriet Arbuthnot (1793–1834), the 19th-century diarist and social commentator, is buried at St Nicholas' in the Fane family plot. Born at Fulbeck Hall as Harriet Fane, she became the second wife of politician and diplomat Charles Arbuthnot and the close confidant of the Duke of Wellington and Lord Castlereagh.

St Nicholas' received an English Heritage Grade I listing in 1966.

In 2011 St Nicholas' was subject to theft of lead from the church roof by a "Lithuanian gang" which had been responsible for twenty such thefts, particularly in Lincolnshire. Following the thefts the porch and south aisle were re-roofed in stainless steel coated with terne.

== Architecture ==
=== Exterior ===
St Nicholas is of ashlar-faced limestone and rubble construction, with roofs of lead, slate, and terne-coated stainless steel. It comprises a chancel, nave, north and south aisles, tower, and a south porch, and is of Norman and Perpendicular styles.

The west tower is Perpendicular style of three stages surmounted on its parapet by eight crocketed pinnacles, one at each corner and one along each side at the centre. The bases of the corner pinnacles contain grotesque gargoyles. The centre pinnacles sit on triangular projections that run below the parapet, with grotesque corbels at their base that intersect with the hood mould arch—moulded arch projections against the wall—above the belfry openings on the tower third stage. The belfry openings are of four lights each, twin-tiered and louvered, topped with trefoil openings. The 13th-century tower lower stage is supported by buttresses at the centre of each wall, its socle, or plinth, topped by a scotia, or rolled moulding. Within the tower north wall middle stage is embedded a fragment of Anglo-Saxon sculpture. The tower contains six bells, and a clock offset to the north on its east face.

The Perpendicular clerestory windows north and south are 15th-century, each with three lights, topped with cinquefoil moulded surrounds, and edged above with hood moulding. Part of a blocked roundel window, above the east bay of the south arcade, is evidence of earlier circular 10th-century clerestory windows. The clerestory parapet is horizontally straight, set with a raised latticework frieze with quatrefoil moulding, and shields within the alternate central rhombus devices. Upon the parapet and between the windows are crocketed pinnacles supported by reused 15th-century grotesque corbels, below which are roof drain holes. The unusual pinnacle on the south-east corner of the nave is referred to by Pevsner: "But what is the strange en-crusted canopy at the SE corner". This pinnacle is a representation of the arms of the Myddleton family, Fulbeck manor owners of the 15th century, and includes a Wyvern and Harpy supporting a shield containing a lion rampant, surmounted by a Saracen's head. The south porch dates from the 14th century, is gabled, with side windows and side stone benches. The north and south aisle roofs are both 19th-century. The south aisle pointed-arch east window of three lights, and the south wall's two windows of four lights, are all 14th-century, and contain trefoil heads and quatrefoils, with hood mould surrounds.

=== Interior ===
St Nicholas' accommodates seating for 356.

The 15th-century tower arch comprises two half columns supporting a moulded pointed arch. Partially surrounding the arch is a hood mould, finishing at its base with carved leaf label stops. The upper part of the arch, within the tower, contains the church organ. Within the tower are 15th-century stairs to the belfry, accessed by an 18th-century timber arched door. The stairs ascend the west side of the tower and are lit by a Perpendicular window of three lights. The middle stage of the tower is lit by two pointed arched 19th-century windows at the south. Above the tower arch are raised indications of the roof line of the Saxon nave, steeply pointed, with the remains of coping stones and quoins showing the extent of the earlier church.

The chancel and chancel arch show the complete Kirk restoration of 1888—the restored and enlarged chancel arch is of 14th-century style. Most chancel fittings are from the 19th and 20th century. However, the chancel retains a sedilia at the south, dating from the 13th century, although restored. In the north wall is a recess, originally for a tomb, which contains an iron bound chest of the 16th century. At the north is a credence table, or shelf, constructed from a 12th-century capital. Choir seating from the 15th-century was used to provide two existing chancel seats which contain original misericords. A former altarpiece, Christ and the Woman of Samaria, is in the style of Stothard. The chancel east window, by Heaton, Butler and Bayne, is contemporary with the Kirk restoration, noted by Pevsner as "the beautiful five-light chancel E window in the style of 1300". Further 19th-century chancel windows are of two lights, and by William Wailes, with one by O'Connor, and in the same 14th-century style. Label stops depicting human heads are found on all the interior nave and aisle window arches.

Behind the pulpit, and in the north wall of the nave, is a fragment of a 12th-century arcade—Pevsner believes the fragment could also be a part of a square font—and above it, a 15th-century arched opening to a previous roof loft. The nave arcades are 13th-century. They define three bays north and south, and are of double-chamfered arches and round piers. The south aisle east window, part of the Kirk restoration, is Perpendicular, other windows Decorated period, although "over-restored" (Pevsner). Within the south aisle is a 14th-century piscina, and brackets for statues.

The north and south doorways are of c.1300. The north doorway is pointed with heavy moulding, and the south the same but including a hood mould. The 14th-century south door is of paneled oak with an ogee-headed wicket door inset. To the west of the south door interior is a 17th-century alms box.

The church font is of late 12th-century Transitional period, drum shaped, with an octagonal pier on each corner of a square plinth. Between each set of piers are five narrower twisted columns surmounted by intersecting arches. Around the font rim runs a cable moulding, with leaf mouldings dropped below on three sides, and dog-tooth moulding on the fourth. Pevsner describes the font as "a splendid piece, due, however, perhaps to re-tooling". National Heritage states that it was "heavily recut in the 19th century".

Church plate includes a 1626 chalice and cover, and a 1724 paten.

== Memorials ==
Church monuments and plaques arranged along the north aisle and north chancel are chiefly dedicated to the Fane family from the late 17th century onwards, while those on the south are dedicated to others.

South aisle monuments includes that to Elizabeth Shaw (died 1736), in cartouche form with cherubs and urn. A monument to Elizabeth Brown (died 1683) contains a cartouche with coat of arms and broken pediment. A 1680 slab at the south aisle west window commemorates Timothy Thorold (died 1641), described as a "Dr. of Physick", and his family. Of the Fane memorials in the north aisle, the earliest is to Neville Fane (died 1680), being a curved-top slab with an urn on a plinth with painted heraldic shields. A slab memorial is dedicated to Thomas Ball, servant of Sir Francis Fane, inscribed:

In Memory of Thomas Ball Who dyed the 10th day of February, 1673 in the 74th year Of his Age. His Wife Was Elizabeth daughter of M. Thomas West of Doncaster by Whom hee had six Sons, & left onely one daughter Elizabeth Survivinge
Hee was 50 years a faithfull servant to Sr Francis Fane Kt of the Bath Second Son of Francis Earle of Westmorland, & travelled with him into Holland, Denmark, Germany, Loraine, Switzerland, Naples, France & Flanders, where hee considered the Courts and Camps of most of the European Princes their splendor & mutabilitie, concluding with the Preacher, there was nothing new under the Sun, & that all was Vanity, and onely one thing neccisary to fear God & to keep his Commandments:
Soe doth;: F. F. who fixed this stone: 1674.

In the churchyard is a memorial to six men of the parish who fell in the First and Second World Wars.

== Lychgate and cross ==
At the entrance to St Nicholas' churchyard is the church lychgate. Being included in the village conservation area, it is a locally protected structure. Next to the lychgate is an octagonal Grade II listed cross base and shaft, dating from the 14th century with 19th-century additions.

== Rectors ==
- 1225–26 – John de Kare and William Romani. Patron: Peter I, Duke of Brittany
- 1282–83 – Ralph de Haggel. Patron: Queen Eleanor
- 1290-91– Matthew de Wetheresden and Walter de Penbrug. Patron: John II, Duke of Brittany
- 1326 – John de Melbourn. Patron: Edward II
- 1328 – John de Neuton and John de Nesfeld. Patron: John of Brittany, Earl of Richmond
- 1364 – Richard de Farnedale and Thomas Hardewyk. Patron: John of Gaunt, 1st Duke of Lancaster
- 1379 – Richard de Hattfeld. Patron: John of Gaunt, 1st Duke of Lancaster
- 1400–01 – Hugh Buzom. Patron: Ralph de Neville
- 1415 – Thomas Morton. Patron: Ralph de Neville
- 1416 – Robert de Morton. Patron: Ralph de Neville
- 1416 – Thomas Morton. Patron: Ralph de Neville
- 1417–18 – John Eseby. Patron: Ralph de Neville
- 1466–67 – Thomas Benne. Patron: John Neville, 1st Marquess of Montagu
- 1471–72 – Thomas Wollor. Patron: Henry Tudor, 2nd Earl of Richmond
- 1480 – Richard Snow. Patron: Edward IV
- 1483–84 – William Poteman. Patron: Richard III
- 1487 – John Dyghton. Patron: Henry VII
- 1514 – William Toft
- 1515 – John Constable
- 1515 – Thomas Burgh.
- 1523 – Thomas Johnson
- 1539 – Alexander Seton. Patron: Charles Brandon, 1st Duke of Suffolk

Secession and break with Rome

- 1542 – William Cooke
- 1560 – John Robinson. Patron: Henry, Lord Strange
- 1577 – John Robinson. Patron: Queen Elizabeth
- 1598 – Miles Garthwaite. Patron: Queen Elizabeth
- 1616–17 – Lyon Ellis. Patron: Charles Beresford
- 1640 – Dove Williamson

Interregnum

- 1645 – Tristram Hinchcliffe

Restoration

- 1660 – Dove Williamson
- 1680 – Thomas Williamson. Patron: Hervious Stanton
- 1691 – Nathaniel Goldington. Patron: Francis Fane
- 1694 – John South. Patron: Francis Fane
- 1701 – Edward Fane. Patron: Francis Fane
- 1737 – Edward Fane. Patron: Francis Fane
- 1760 – Richard Cust. Patron: Jane Fane
- 1783 – Joseph Wright. Patron: James Evelyn
- 1803 – Henry Neville. Patron: Henry Fane
- 1807 – Edward Fane. Patron: Henry Fane
- 1863 – Arthur Fane. Patron: executor of Henry Fane
- 1872 – John Peacock. Patron: Mildmay Willson
- 1884 – Vere Francis Willson. Patron: Mildmay Willson
- 1912 – Henry Carrington Fanshawe Bingham
- 1952 – Henry Gordon Mitchell. Patron: trustees of C. T. Fane
- 1972 – Peter Henry Geake. Patron: Julian Fane

United benefice with Caythorpe and Carlton Scroop

- 1983 – Hugh Charles Middleton. Patron: Bishop of Lincoln
- 1996 – Brian Humphrey Lucas. Patron: Julian Fane
- 2005 – June Freshney
- 20?? – Ali Healey
