= St Bartholomew's Church, Welby =

St Bartholomews's Church, Welby
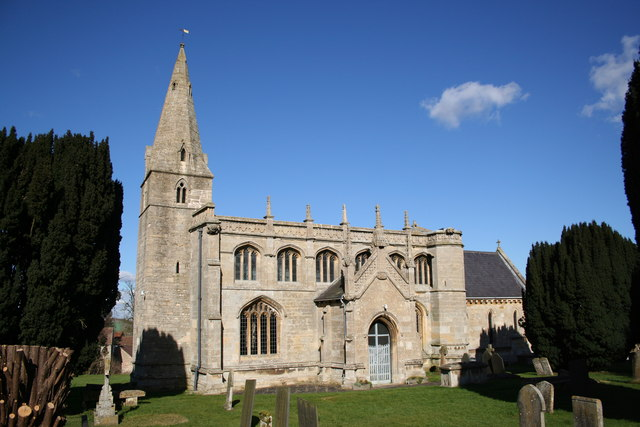
- Church of St Bartholomew, Welby
- St Bartholomews's Church, Welby
- 52.9322°N 0.5503°W
- OS grid reference: SK 97540 38184
- Country: England
- Denomination: Church of England

History
- Dedication: St Bartholomew

Administration
- Province: Canterbury
- Diocese: Diocese of Lincoln
- Deanery: Deanery of Loveden
- Parish: Ancaster and Wilsford

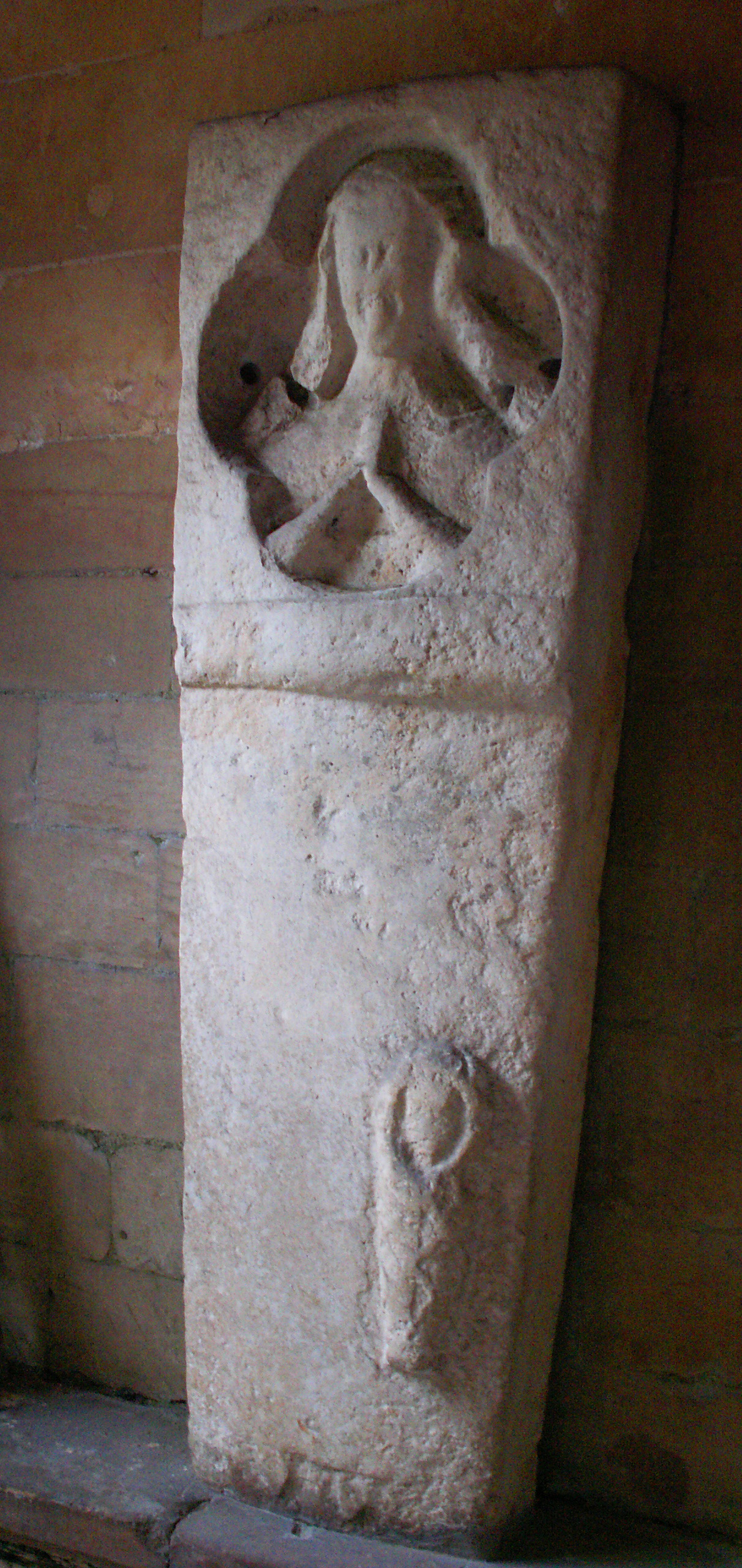
A carved tomb cover in St Bartholomew's Church. A shrouded baby is shown at its base.

St Bartholomew's Church is a Grade I listed Anglican church dedicated to St Bartholomew the Apostle, in the English village of Welby, Lincolnshire. It is 4 miles (6 km) north-east of Grantham, and 1 mile (1.6 km) east of High Dyke, on part of the old Ermine Street Roman road. The church is in the ecclesiastical parish and Group of Ancaster and Wilsford, in the Deanery of Loveden, and the Diocese of Lincoln.

== History ==
In the Domesday Book of 1086, Welby is recorded as having a priest and a church.

St Bartholomews's parish register dates from 1569. The south side of the church nave was rebuilt in about 1400. In 1873, the north aisle was extended and the chancel rebuilt by J. H. Hakewill, at a cost of £450, in a style that matched the Early English original. A church organ was added at the same time, at a cost of £140. In 1887 a carved oak Gothic reredos was installed.

In the 19th and earlier 20th century, Welby was part of the rural deanery of Grantham North, and archdeaconry and Diocese of Lincoln. The living included a rectory, the gift of the Bishop of Lincoln. In 1824 Rev'd William Dodwell bequeathed to the parish £1,608 11s. 6d., with the bank annuities of 2½ per cent to be used for the benefit of the poor. £15 of the yearly dividend was given to the schoolmaster for the education of six boys and six girls, and £10 for the apprenticing of a poor boy, with the remainder to provide clothing and coal to poor parishioners. From 1867 the rector was Rev. William Armetriding Frith MA, of Worcester College, Oxford, and from 1926 the Rev. Thomas Augustus Child BD, of London University.

A parish diary exists with entries dating from the 1860s to 1968. The diary records reorientation of the seating, the 1872 addition of a stove in the body of the church, and in 1927, the partial laying of a concrete floor under the nave and chancel.

In 2001, Lindsey Archaeological Services were commissioned by Welby Parochial Church Council to provide a watching brief on an archaeological investigation before underfloor heating was installed. Pews and pew platforms were removed, and investigation trenches dug under flagstone floors in the north aisle, and the north and south sides of the nave. Finds included remains of a previous lime mortar floor, stained glass and window lead fragments, pottery of the 15th to 19th centuries, some graves, and shroud pins.

The church received an English Heritage Grade I listing in 1966. Welby Parochial Church Council has gained funding from the Heritage Lottery Fund for restoration.

== Architecture ==
St Bartholomews's seats 240. It is built in ashlar-dressed limestone rubble, originates from the 13th century, and is Early English and Perpendicular in style. It consists of a chancel, nave, north aisle, a west-facing tower with spire, a vestry, and a south porch.

The Early English tower contains four bells. It is surmounted by an octagonal broached spire containing two tiers of lucarnes. The panelled parapet above the Perpendicular nave clerestory is pinnacled, and contains shields within quatrefoils on its north side. Of the north side pinnacles only bases remain. The roof is drained by seven gargoyles. The Perpendicular "tall" south porch is surmounted by crocketed pinnacles on its gable canopy corners, which Pevsner describes as "oversized". The 16th-century south door has traceried panels – the north doorway, opposite, is blocked.

The interior is partly of ashlar and partly of exposed rubble. The north arcade is of 15th-century octagonal piers defining four bays. The tower contains a 13th-century tower arch. There is evidence of an earlier nave at its west side indicated by a lower roof pitch line. Rood doors survive, the rood screen being early 16th-century, with 1948 restoration. The pulpit and lectern is 19th-century, and the octagonal font, 17th.

Within the porch is a 14th-century stone tomb cover with relief depictions of a woman's head and shoulders within a quatrefoil recess, and a shrouded baby. It was originally sited in the graveyard. The porch contains an inscribed commemoration to the charity founded in 1824 by the Rev'd William Dodwell.

St Bartholomew's churchyard contains a memorial to eight servicemen killed during the First World War, and one during the Second.
