= St Martin's Church, Ancaster =

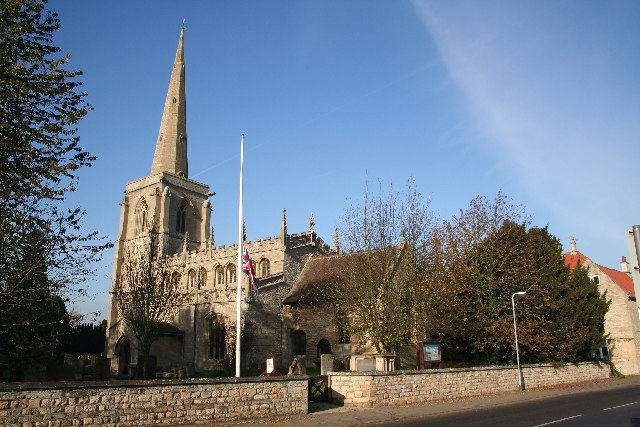
- St Martin's Church, Ancaster
- St Martin's Church, Ancaster
- 52.9805°N 0.5378°W
- OS grid reference: SK 98270 43573
- Country: England
- Denomination: Church of England

History
- Dedication: St Martin

Administration
- Province: Canterbury
- Diocese: Diocese of Lincoln
- Deanery: Deanery of Loveden
- Parish: Ancaster and Wilsford

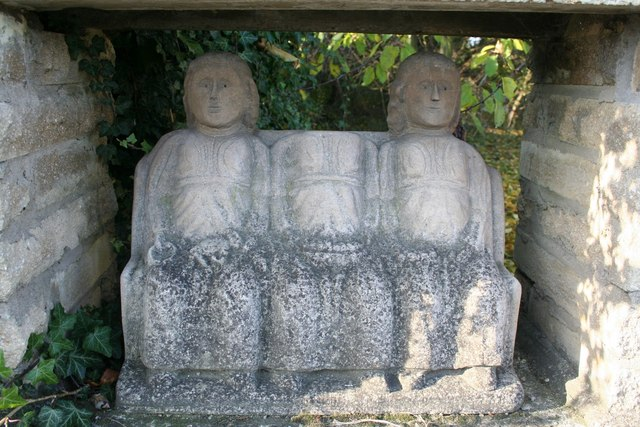
Matres and Matronae at St Martin's Ancaster, with two modern heads added

St Martin's Church is a Grade I listed Anglican church, dedicated to Martin of Tours, in Ancaster, Lincolnshire, England. The church is 6 miles (10 km) north-east from Grantham, below the southern edge of the Lincoln Cliff, and at the side of High Dyke, part of the old Ermine Street Roman road. St Martin's is in the ecclesiastical parish of Ancaster and Wilsford, in the Deanery of Loveden, and the Diocese of Lincoln.

== History ==
At the time of the Domesday Book in 1086, there were two churches in the vicinity of Ancaster, and, to the east of the site of the present church, a hermit's chapel dedicated to St Mary.

St Martin's register dates from 1722. In 1859 the nave was re-floored, refitted and repaired, under the direction of Kirk and Parry, and in 1912 the tower was restored. In 1898-99 the church organ and font were moved into the body of the church. In May 1909 the churchyard was closed for burials except for those in family vaults.

== Architecture ==
St Martin's accommodates 220 seated worshippers. It is built in Ancaster stone, and is of Norman, Early English and Decorated styles. It consists of a chancel, nave, north and south aisles, a west-facing tower with spire, and a south porch.

The tower, containing five bells, is ashlar-faced and surmounted by battlements. The spire contains three tiers of lucarnes. The roof parapet contains pinnacles and gargoyles, and the tops of the buttresses, grotesque figures. There are 15th-century clerestory windows within the nave.

The four-bay Norman arcade on the north side of the nave is from c.1160-70. It has circular piers, with arch mouldings that become increasingly more elaborate towards the east. The three-bay south arcade is Early English with Decorated walls. The south aisle has highly decorated Perpendicular battlements with pinnacles, and piers with round arches, indented capitals, and octagonal abaci. Parts of the chancel screen are incorporated into the pews. The font is 12th-century, and the south doorway, with a trefoiled head, is Early English. The tower arch is of Decorated style, and the roof, with attached figures, Perpendicular.

The four stained glass windows in the chancel, and two at the west end of the church, were presented by F. W. Affix. Other memorial windows were incorporated in 1880 and 1904 by The Rev’d Pemberton Lloyd MA, vicar from 1895 to 1903, to Lucy Anderson Lloyd, Lucy Penelope Lloyd, Marjorie Stote and Stephen Pemberton MA, BM. Set in the south wall is a late 13th-century window with cusped lights and an encircled quatrefoil. The south aisle windows are of Decorated style.

North aisle monuments include that to Elizabeth Long (died 1743), as a tablet incorporating a trumpeting angel, and another, by King of Bath, to John Roe (died 1796), as an obelisk fronted by a standing woman with urn. In the chancel are 19th-century wall plaques to the Allix family of Sudbrook Hall. In the south aisle are 18th-century wall plaques, one, dated 1756, of a pediment and flaming urn. The church's chalice is of c.1770 London manufacture, with its cover c.1569.

In the porch are two ecclesiastical effigies, one from the early 14th century, and in the cemetery are several stone coffins. Close to the church are Roman sculptures, including representations of the "Dew Matres", a small altar, and a Roman milestone of the time of Constantine the Great (306–337).
