= Carlton Scroop =

Village and civil parish in Lincolnshire, England

Coordinates: 52.993957°N 0.589646°W

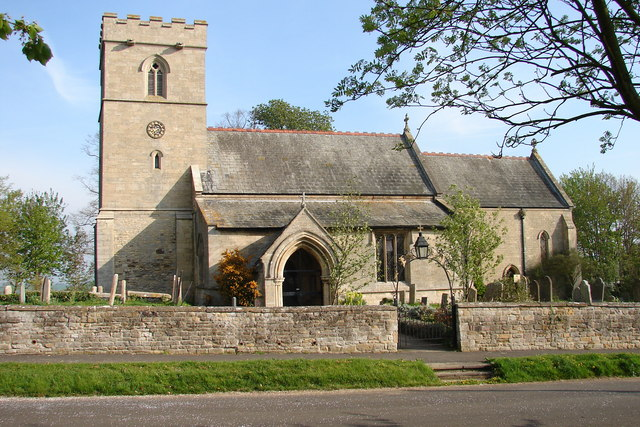
- Church of St Nicholas

- Location within Lincolnshire
- Population: 304 (2011)
- OS grid reference: SK949450
  - London: 105 mi (169 km) S
- Civil parish: Carlton Scroop And Normanton-On-Cliffe
- District: South Kesteven
- Shire county: Lincolnshire
- Region: East Midlands
- Country: England
- Sovereign state: United Kingdom
- Post town: GRANTHAM
- Postcode district: NG32
- Dialling code: 01400 (Loveden)
- Police: Lincolnshire
- Fire: Lincolnshire
- Ambulance: East Midlands
- UK Parliament: Grantham and Bourne

Carlton Scroop is a small village and civil parish in the South Kesteven district of Lincolnshire, England. The population of the civil parish (including Normanton) at the 2011 census was 304. It is situated 6 miles (10 km) north-east from the market town of Grantham and 4 miles (6 km) east from the village of Hougham. The A607 road to Lincoln passes through the centre of the village.

== History ==
The village is listed in the Domesday survey as "Carletune".

Carlton Scroop Grade I listed Anglican church is dedicated to St Nicholas. Parts of the fabric are Norman, although the most obvious features are Decorated. The east window, depicting two kneeling figures each holding a shield, is an example of 14th-century medieval stained glass. Called the Newmarch window it dates from 1310. The base of the tower is 12th-century and the upper part from 1632, constructed after the former steeple collapsed.

Following the 1834 Poor Law Amendment Act, the parish subscribed to the Grantham Poor Law Union.

The village was once split in two by the Honington and Lincoln railway, opened in 1867, later part of the Great Northern Railway. The railway was closed during the Beeching cuts of 1965.

A microwave tower formed part of a cold war emergency microwave communications system, 'Backbone'. A Cold War era bunker of the Royal Observer Corps was built in 1965 and abandoned in 1968, and is now demolished.

== Village ==
Carlton Scroop is situated below the Lincoln Cliff, an escarpment edge that separates the Lincolnshire Wolds from the Vale of Trent. On the Cliff, 1 mile (1.6 km) to the north, is the village of Normanton on Cliffe.

The village is part of the ecclesiastical parish of Carlton Scroop and Normanton on Cliffe, itself part of the Caythorpe Group of parishes in the Loveden Deanery of the Diocese of Lincoln. The civil parish has the same boundaries. The church is dedicated to Saint Nicholas; the 2013 incumbent is the Rev'd Ali Healy.

The Viking Way long-distance footpath passes through the village.

A mast is situated just outside the village, part of the microwave telephone link from London to Scotland.
