= Grantham House =

Town house in Grantham, Lincolnshire, England

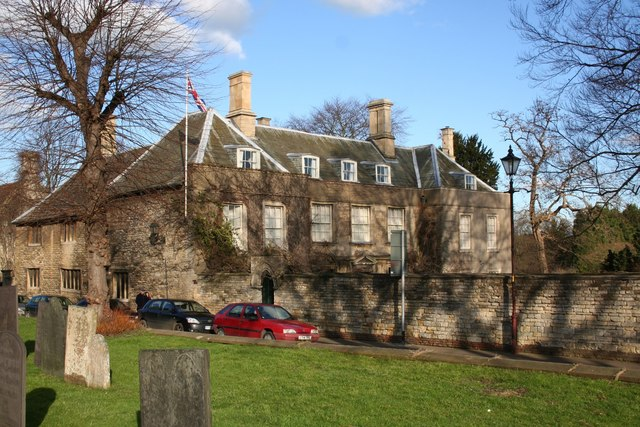
- Grantham House

- Location within Lincolnshire

General information
- Location: Grantham, England
- Coordinates: 52.9149°N 0.6400°W
- Completed: 1380
- Owner: National Trust

Website
- https://www.nationaltrust.org.uk/grantham-house

Listed Building – Grade I
- Designated: 8 May 1950
- Reference no.: 1062508 - House; 1062508 - Stables

Listed Building – Grade II*
- Designated: 20 April 1972
- Reference no.: 1062509 - Garden Wall
- House open by appointment only (see Website for details)

Grantham House is a town house, built in 1380, which is owned by the National Trust. It is in Grantham, Lincolnshire, England.

The House is in Castlegate and its architectural features have been enhanced and remodelled several times over the centuries and include a 16th-century chimney stack, 17th century windows and an 18th-century staircase. The House and the Stables are both Grade I listed buildings and the Wall and Doorway for the riverside garden is Grade II* listed. It was known as 'Hall House' in the 16th century after the Hall family who owned it and important guests during this period include Cardinal Wolsey and Margaret Tudor, Queen of Scots.

The house is open daily as a community space (there is no entry charge). There is a café, second-hand book shop and expansive gardens.
