= Angel and Royal =

Hotel in Grantham, Lincolnshire, in operation since 1203

The Angel and Royal Hotel
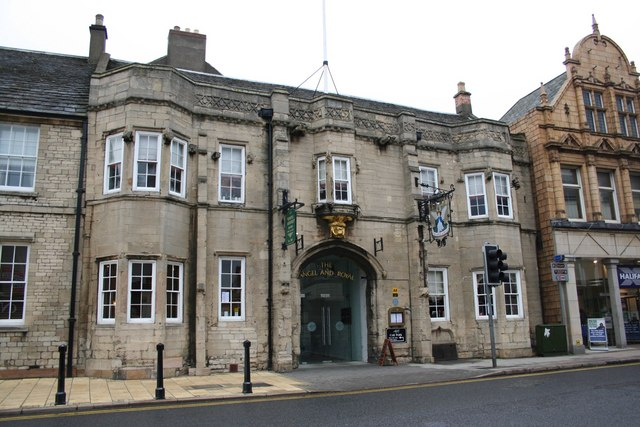
- The Angel and Royal Hotel
- Former names: The Angel, The Angel Inn

General information
- Type: Inn, hotel
- Architectural style: Medieval
- Location: High Street, Grantham, Lincolnshire, England
- Coordinates: 52.913006°N 0.642584°W
- Renovated: 14th C, 15th C, 2002
- Owner: Privately Owned
- Affiliation: None

Technical details
- Material: Stone, brick
- Floor count: 2

Other information
- Number of rooms: 29

Website
- www.angelandroyal.co.uk

Listed Building – Grade I
- Designated: 8 May 1950
- Reference no.: 1062486

The Angel and Royal is a hotel in Grantham, Lincolnshire, which has had a hotel on site since 1203, making it one of the oldest hotels in the world. The hotel is known to have hosted a large number of royals in the past.

== History ==
Originally there was a hostel on the site which was named The Angel, this built by the Knights Templar in 1203 on the Great North Road, which at the time passed through the centre of Grantham. The hostelry was run by the Knights until their dissolution in 1312. The hostel started developing into a coaching inn over the years.

In 1812 the Inn was sold by Lord Brownlow to Sir William Manners, along with his other property in Grantham. In 2002 the hotel was purchased by Ashdale Hotels and underwent extensive renovation. In 2019 the hotel was sold to a local businessman and has traded as an independent hotel since. In November 2025 it was awarded 3 stars by the AA.

=== Royal visits ===
A number of English royals are known to have stayed at The Angel. The first to stay was King John, who held court at the hotel on 23 February 1213. Edward III and Queen Philippa stayed at the hotel in the 14th century; their heads are carved on the front of the building.

On 19 October 1483 Richard III held court at the inn. It was from the "Chambre de' Roi" that he sent a letter requesting for the Great Seal to issue the death warrant against his cousin, Henry Stafford, 2nd Duke of Buckingham for his instigation of Buckingham's rebellion. Copies of the letter, the original of which is kept by the British Museum, are displayed in the hotel's dining room.

After this, the next royal to visit was Charles I who stayed on 17 May 1633 to receive homage from the alderman of Grantham at the time, Henry Ferman. Oliver Cromwell, fighting against Charles, quartered troops at The Angel in 1643 during the English Civil War, after a successful battle near Grantham. George IV stayed on a number of occasions in the 19th century. Edward VII, who was the Prince of Wales at the time, stayed in 1866.

=== Construction ===
The Angel and Royal consists of a number of buildings surrounding an internal courtyard open at both ends, to allow the passage of coach and horses when the hotel still operated as a coaching inn.

The arched doorway at the front of the building is the oldest part of the facade, originating from the 14th century, as do parts of the courtyard buildings. The heads of Edward III and Philippa are carved on the corbels on either side, underneath an oriel window. Directly under the window is a gold-painted carved wooden figure of an angel. The rest of the facade is approximately a century newer. The front of the building is built of ashlar blocks of locally sourced oolite.

The "Chambre de' Roi", Richard III's room for his stay at the inn, covers the whole of the first floor with the two mullioned bay windows for both ground and first floors at either end.

=== Name ===
The 'Angel' part of the hotel's name comes from the gold-painted wooden demi-angels at the front of the building, holding the crown of Richard III. Despite the many royal visits in previous centuries, the "and Royal" suffix was only added to the name in 1866, when the inn was visited by the future King Edward VII (though he was Prince of Wales at the time).

== See also ==
- Pubs and inns in Grantham
