= St Peter's Church, Ropsley =

Church in Lincolnshire, England

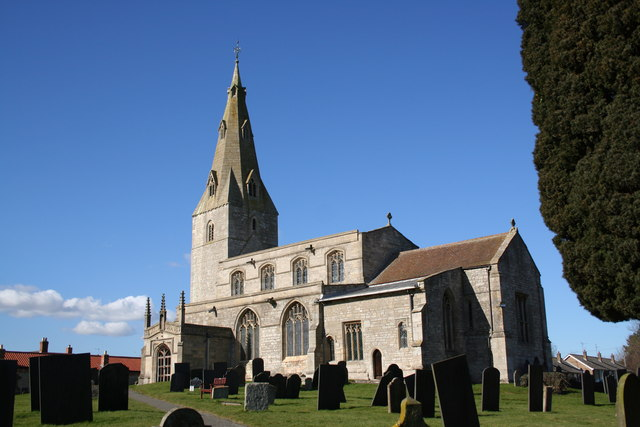
- Church of St Peter, Ropsley
- St Peter's Church, Ropsley
- 52.8962°N 0.5258°W
- OS grid reference: SK 99268 34220
- Country: England
- Denomination: Church of England

History
- Dedication: St Peter

Administration
- Province: Canterbury
- Diocese: Diocese of Lincoln
- Deanery: Deanery of Beltisloe
- Parish: Ropsley

St Peter's Church is a Grade I listed Anglican parish church dedicated to Saint Peter, in Ropsley, Lincolnshire, England. The church is 5 miles (8 km) east from Grantham, and in the South Kesteven Lincolnshire Vales. St Peter's is in the ecclesiastical parish of Ropsley, and is part of the North Beltisloe Group of churches in the Deanery of Beltisloe, and the Diocese of Lincoln.

== History ==
In the 1086 Domesday account a church is recorded at Ropsley. St Peter's originates from the 11th century, with later alterations up to the 17th. The original church was Saxon, parts of which remain in the nave, with a chancel and north aisle with arcade later added by Normans. The chancel was shortened, probably in the 17th century.

Richard Foxe, bishop and founder of Corpus Christi College, Oxford, who was born in Ropsley in 1447–48, provided for the building of the church porch in 1483. Cox confirms the 1483 date, however, Pevsner and English Heritage give the date of porch building, from an inscription above the south door, as 1486. The porch was restored in 1903–04.

St Peter's parish register, which includes that of Little Humby, dates from 1558.

In 1871 a stained glass window was added to the east end of the south aisle, in memory of Harriet Brooke, the widow of a late curate. In 1885 the living included a rectory, residence, and 688 acres (2.8 km^{2}) of glebe land from which a gross yearly income of £769 was derived, this in the gift of the Duke of Rutland. The 1885 parish priest had been, from 1846, the Revd John Henry Coke of Pembroke College, Oxford, who was non-resident. The curate in charge was the Revd Anthony Garstin. By 1933 glebe land was 679 acres (2.7 km^{2}), with a yearly income of £530. The living was now in the gift of the Bishop of Lincoln, with, from 1929, the Revd William Joseph Chantry of Hatfield Hall, Durham, as priest.

The church received an English Heritage Grade I listing in 1984.

A new organ was installed in 2010.

== Architecture ==
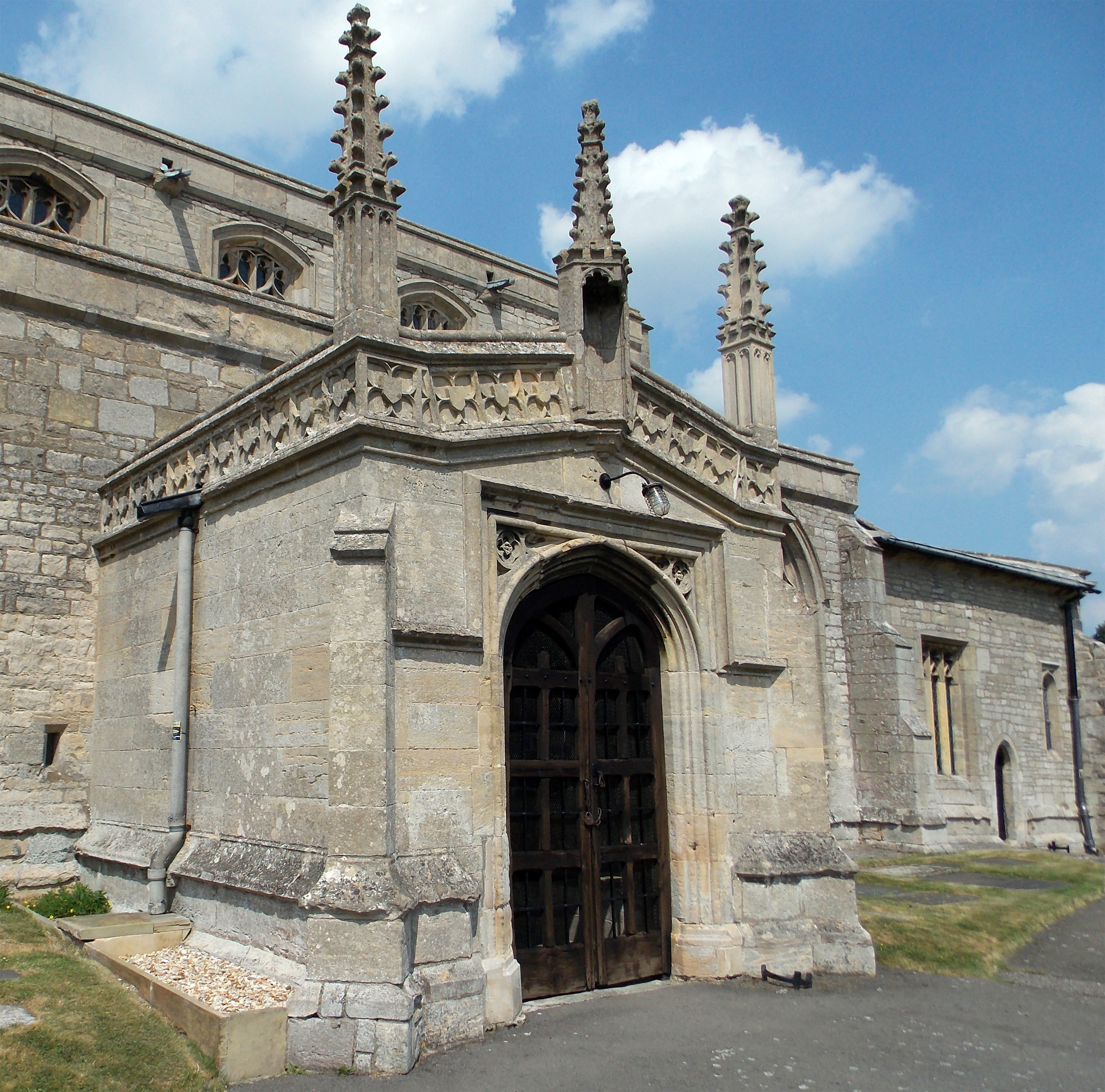
St Peter's 15th-century south porch provided by Bishop Richard Foxe.

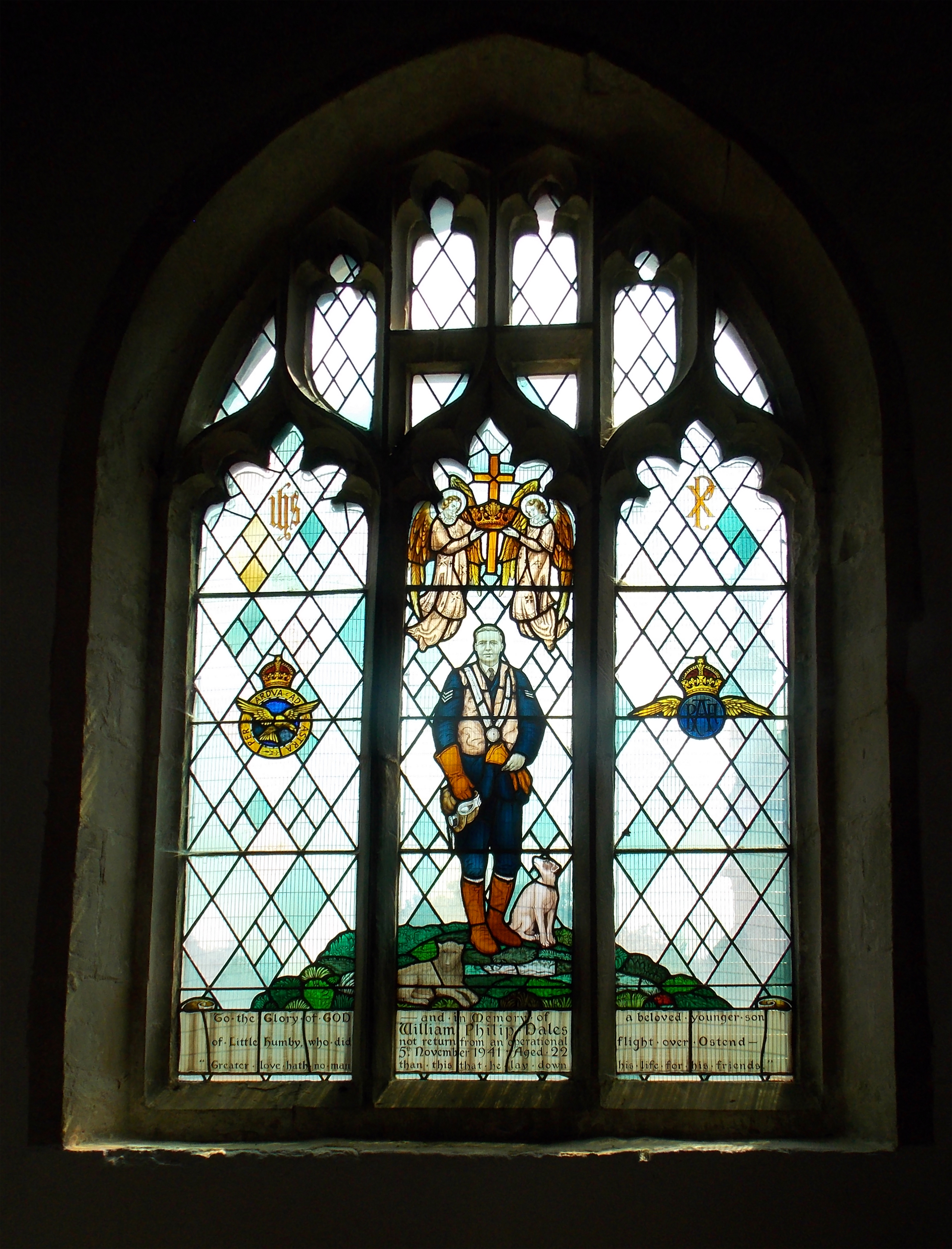
A 1949 stained window to RAF fighter pilot Philip Dales

=== Exterior ===
St Peter's is built in ashlar-dressed limestone rubble, and is Norman and Early English in style. It consists of a chancel, nave, two aisles, a west-facing tower with spire, a south chapel, and a south porch.

The 13th-century tower is in three stages, surmounted by a later 14th-century broach spire incorporating three tiers of lucarnes. Of the tower's two upper stage belfry openings, one is bounded on its sides by narrow columns and headed by a tympana arch containing trefoils. The nave clerestory could be of either Decorated or Perpendicular period. It has four windows north and south and is headed by a plain parapet of little height. The nave roof, drained by two gargoyles on its north side, is lead, and the chancel roof, red tile.

The Perpendicular south porch is surmounted by pinnacles and by a panelled parapet decorated with shields in quatrefoils. An inscription on the outside face of the porch reads: "Hac non vade via, nisi dicas Ave Maria" (go not away unless you say an Ave Maria).

=== Interior ===
St Peter's accommodates seating for 200. The interior contains a north arcade of three bays with circular piers, square abaci, and rounded arches. The chancel arch is Early English, as is the south arcade where one octagonal pier is a 1380 replacement attributed, by inscription, to Thomas Bate, mason of Corby: "Ista columna facta fuit ad festum Sancti Michaelis, Anno Domini MCCCLXXX et nomen factoris thomas bate de Corby."

There are two tomb recesses, one in the south aisle and plain, the other, in the chancel. Pevsner describes the chancel recess as 13th-century, with English Heritage noting it as 14th. Within the chancel is an aumbry, and a double-niche sedilia or Easter Sepulchre, both 14th-century. A further aumbry, and a piscina, are part of the early 13th-century south chapel.

The 15th-century font is octagonal, and of Perpendicular style with quatrefoils and shields. The pulpit dates from the 20th century, the altar rails, the 18th, and the pews, the 19th but retaining 15th-century poppy head bench ends.

Within an east window of the north aisle are fragments of medieval glass with an inscription indicating a 1376 reference to Sir John Welby.

=== Monuments ===
In a south aisle recess, beneath an ogee arch with carved small figures, is an effigy of a lady in 14th-century costume, her head resting on two small cushions.

An alabaster war memorial plaque to parish war dead of the First World War hangs in the church. Further church memorials include a commemorative brass plate on a choir pew to a soldier killed in battle at Arras in 1917. A south wall stained glass window was erected in 1949 in memory of Sgt. Philip Dales, an RAF fighter pilot killed in Belgium in 1941. A later scroll of honour as a framed photograph was added to the church in 2009, commemorating those not found in the other memorials.

In the churchyard, at the south side of the church, is a Grade II listed slate headstone with carved angels, dated 1730.

== Bells ==
The church has two bells, both dating from the 17th century. The larger was cast at the Stamford bell foundry of Toby Norris, and carries the legend "Thomas Norris made mee 1664". The smaller has a legend that reads "Sweetly tolling men do call to taste on meat that feeds the soul 1620." One of them is cracked, the other can be rung.

== Gallery ==
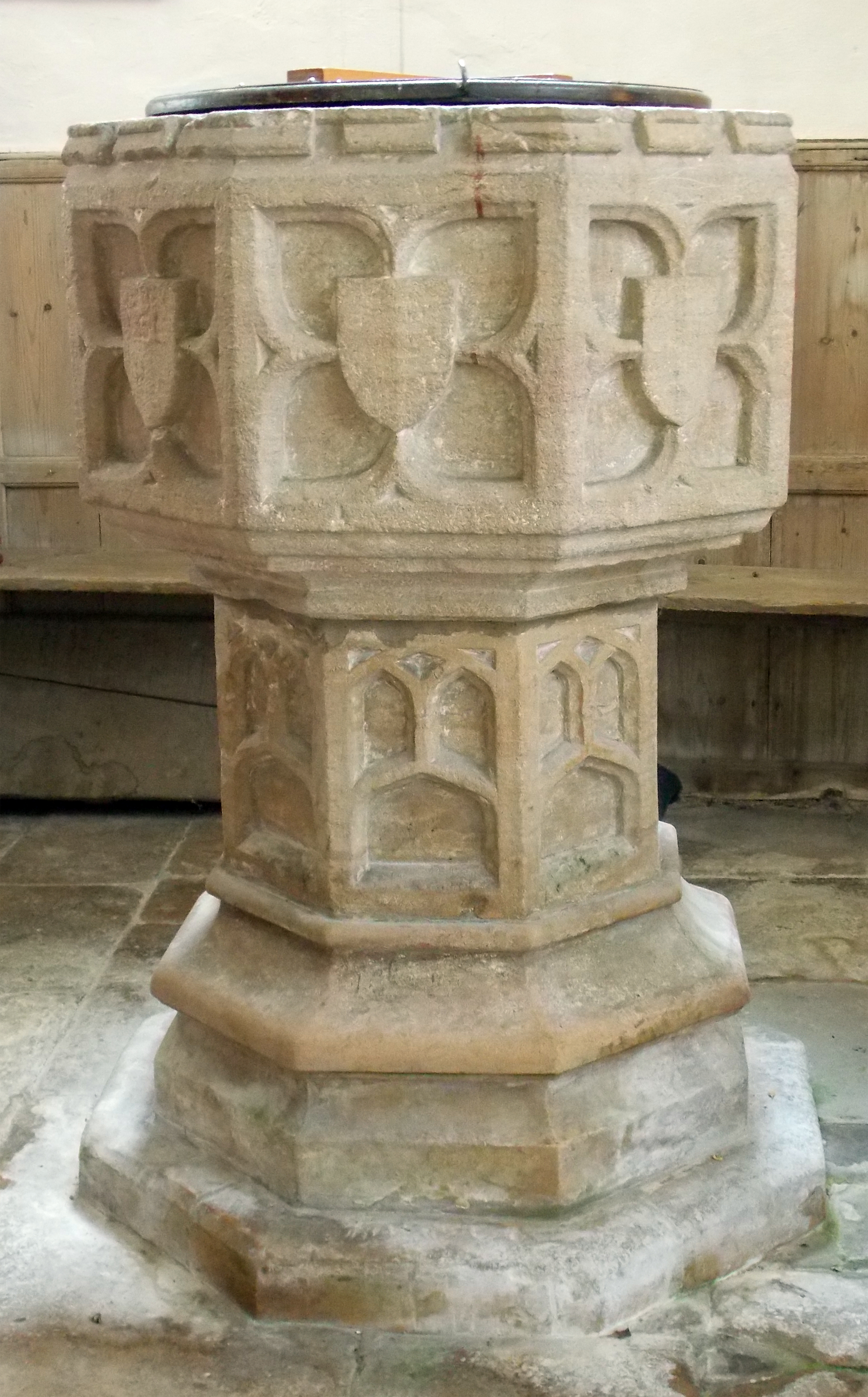
St Peter's 15th-century baptismal font

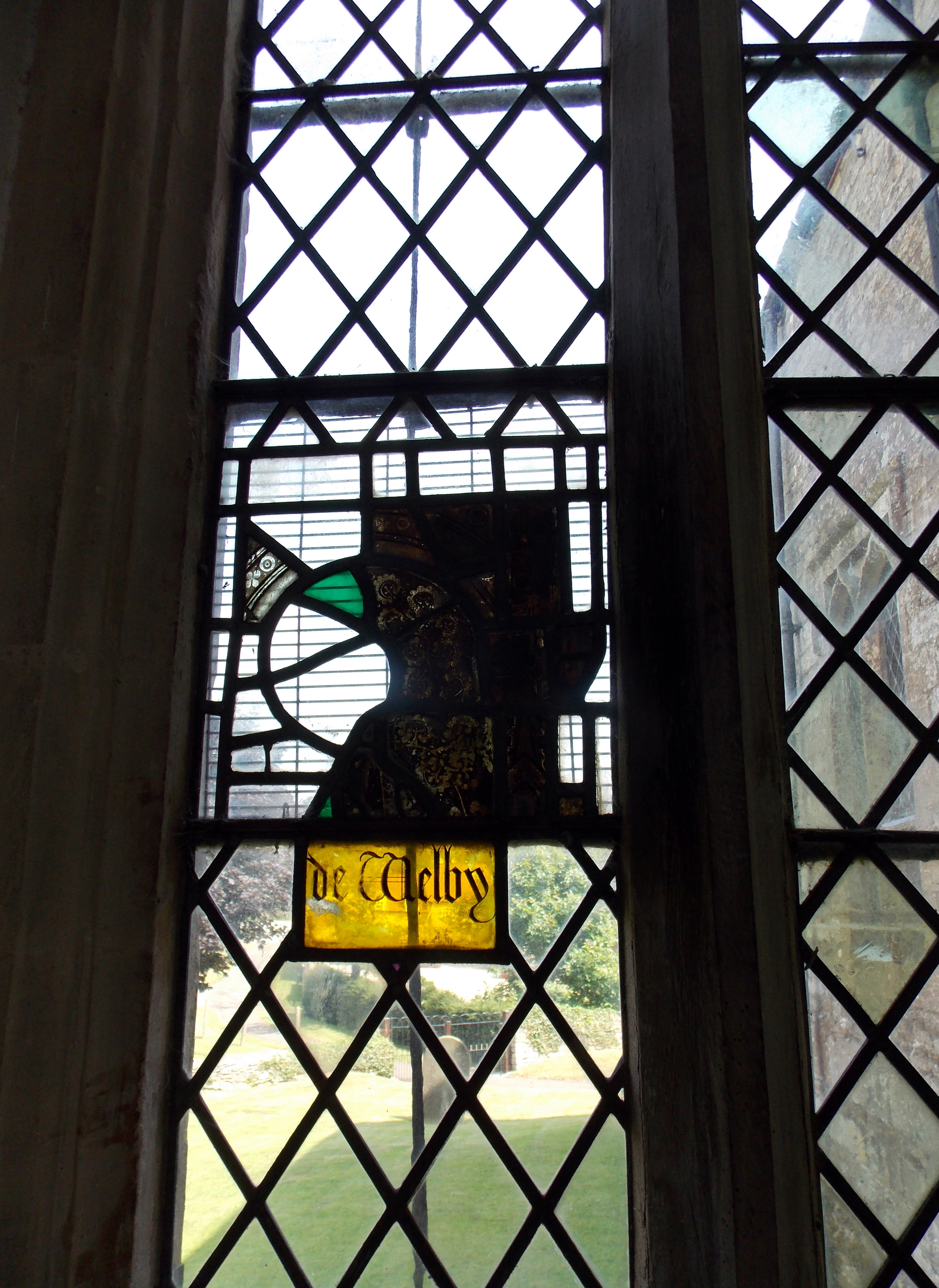
Medieval glass fragment to Sir John Welby in the south aisle east window

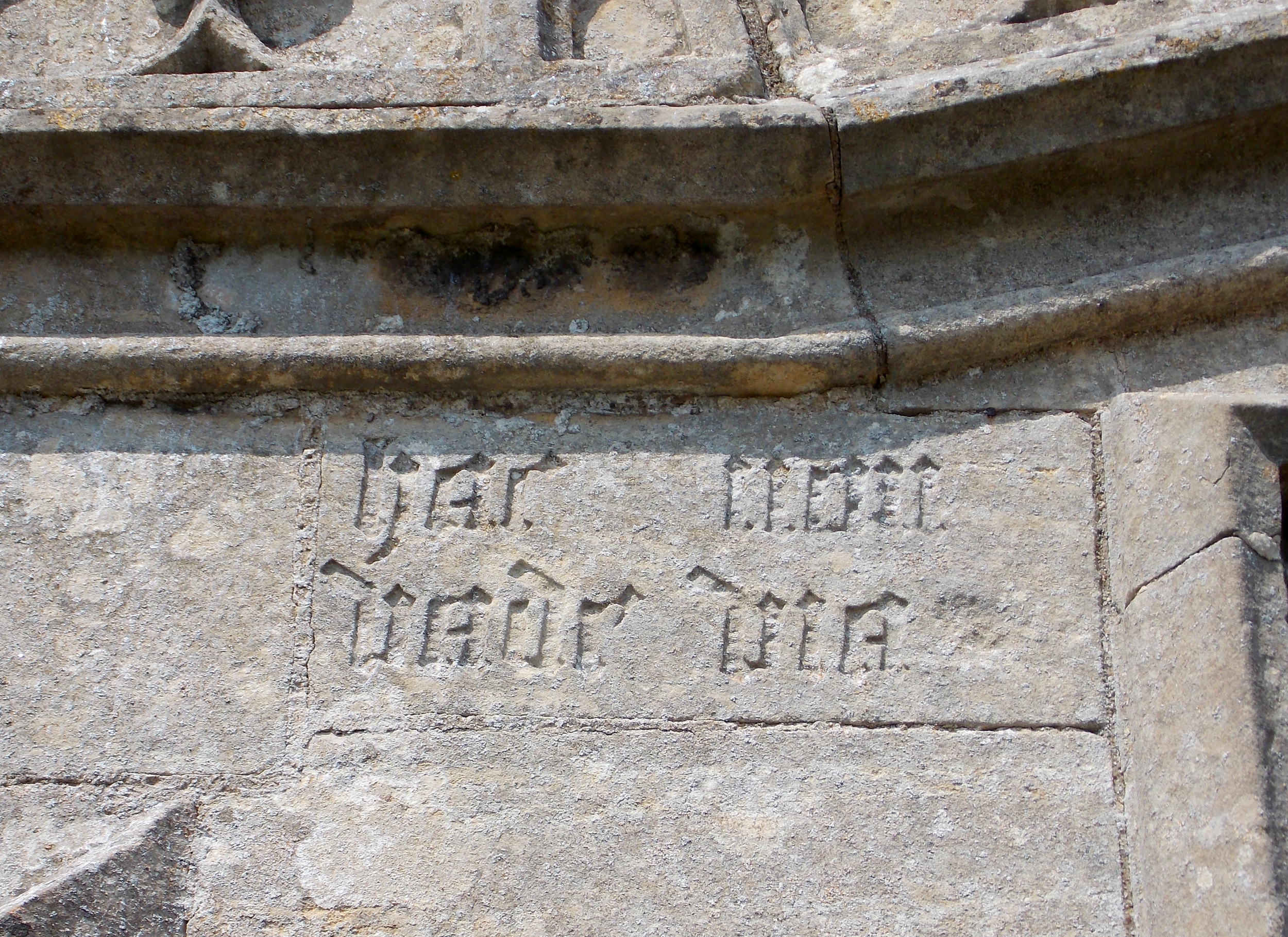
South porch instruction to worshipers: "go not away unless you say an Ave Maria"

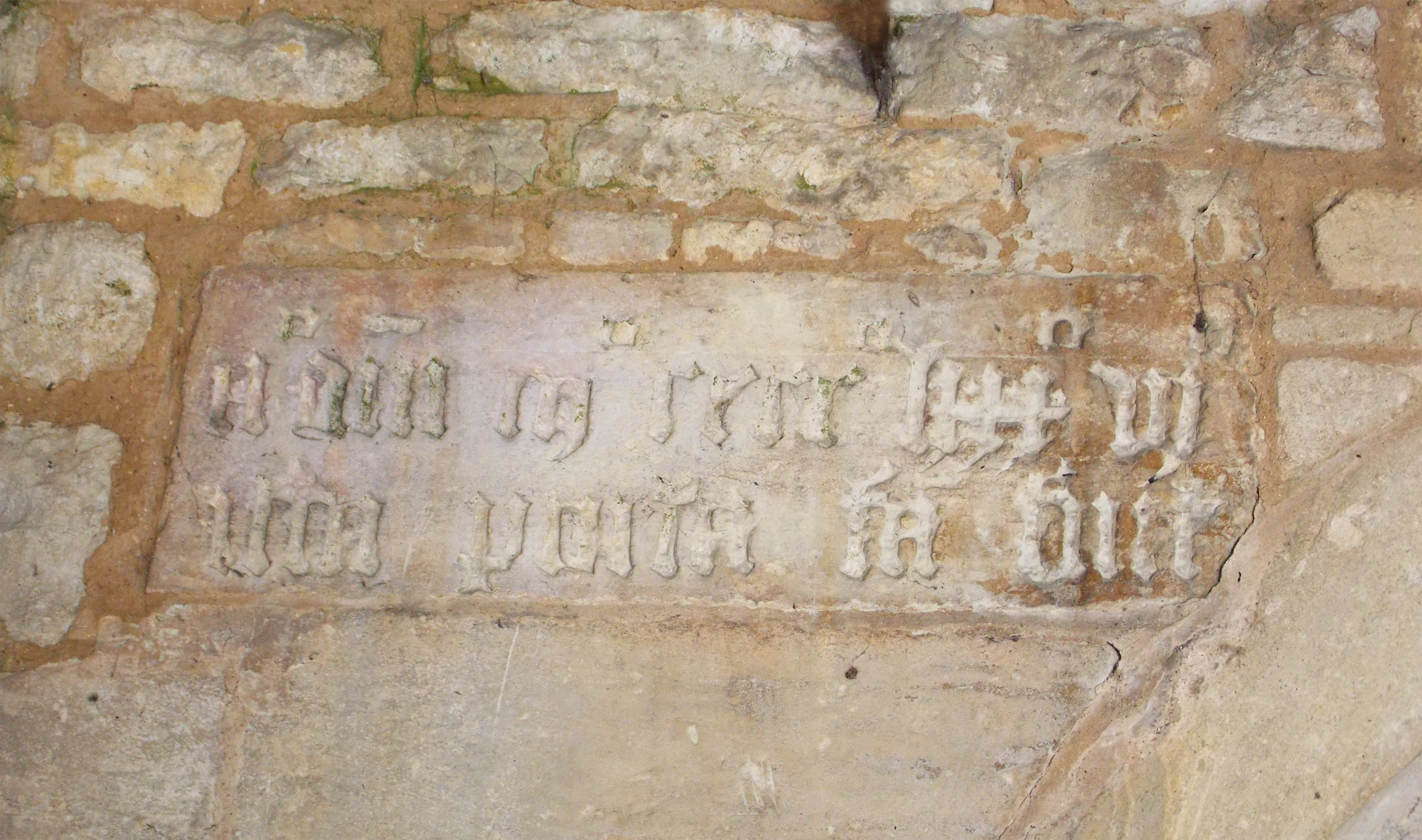
Datestone inside the south porch

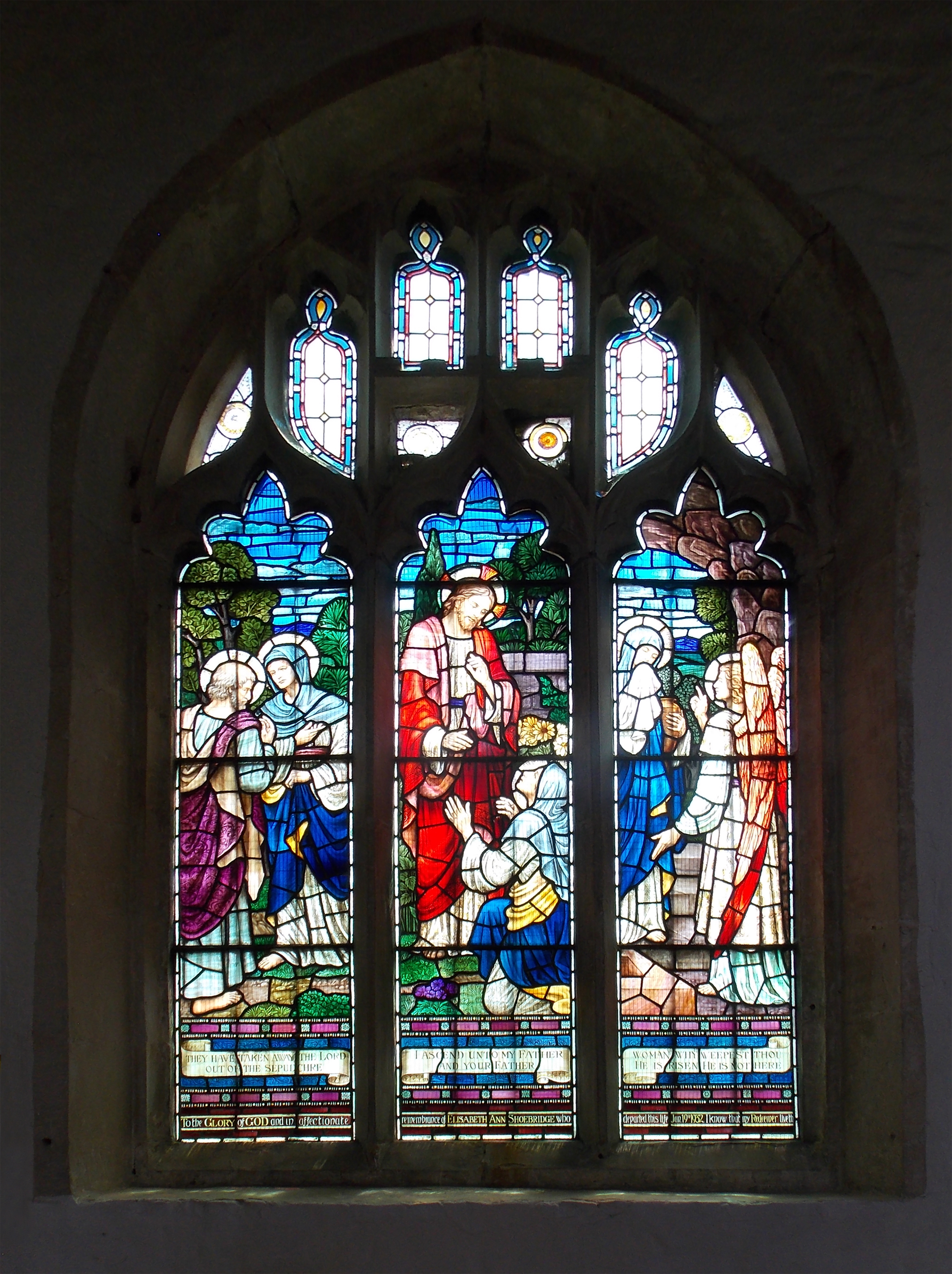
Three-light stained window dedicated to Elisabeth Ann Shoebridge

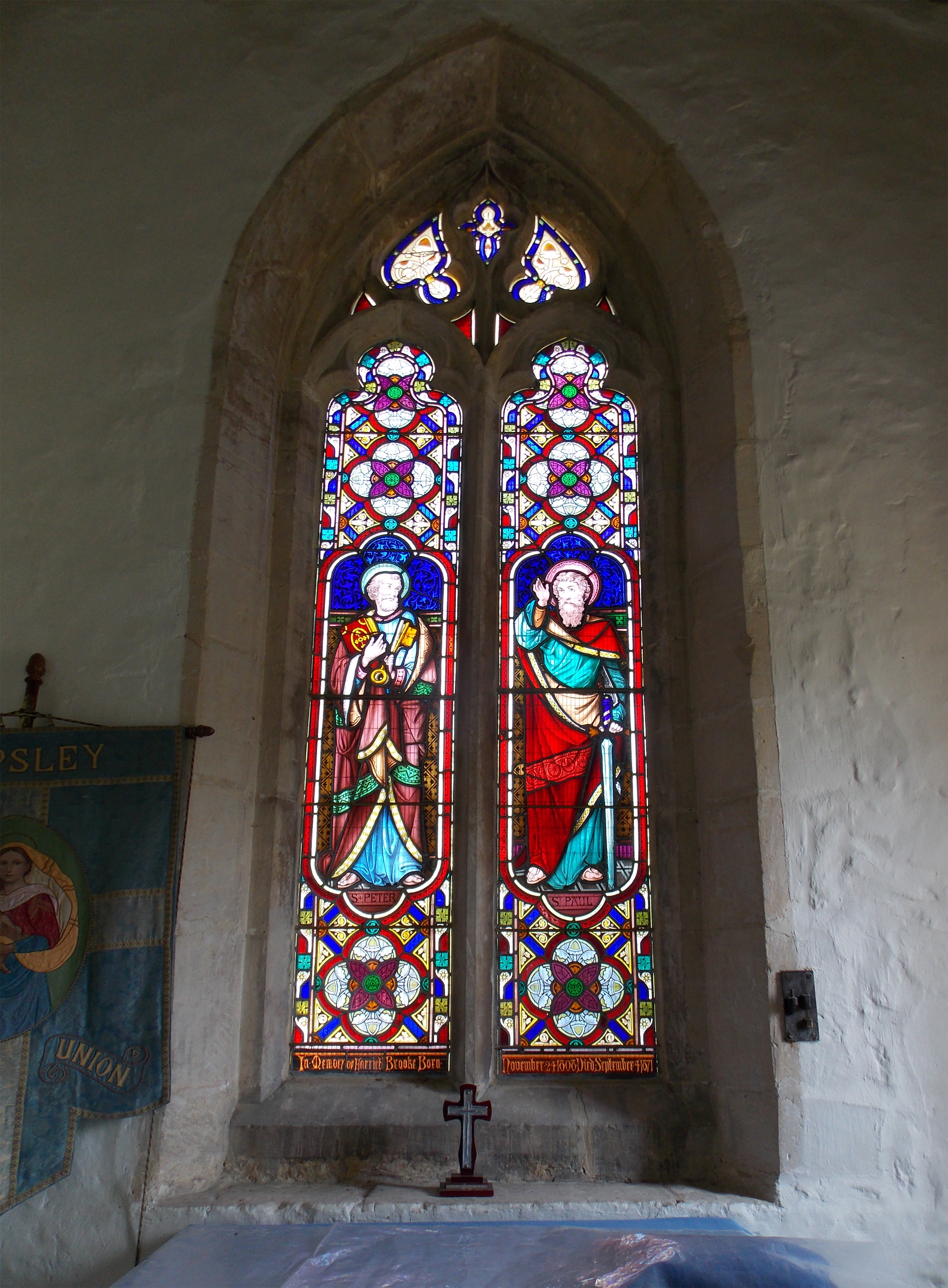
Two-light stained window dedicated to Harriet Brooke
