= Welby, Lincolnshire =

Village in Lincolnshire, England

Coordinates: 52.934780°N 0.5558°W

Welby
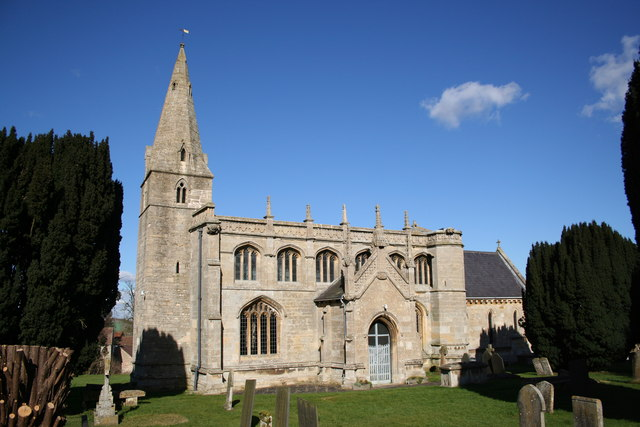
- St Bartholomew's Church, Welby

- Location within Lincolnshire
- Population: 169 (2011)
- OS grid reference: SK971384
  - London: 100 mi (160 km) S
- District: South Kesteven
- Shire county: Lincolnshire
- Region: East Midlands
- Country: England
- Sovereign state: United Kingdom
- Post town: Grantham
- Postcode district: NG32
- Police: Lincolnshire
- Fire: Lincolnshire
- Ambulance: East Midlands
- UK Parliament: Grantham and Bourne

Welby is a village and civil parish in the South Kesteven district of Lincolnshire, England. The population of the civil parish was 169 in 82 households at the 2011 census. It lies 5 miles (8 km) north-east of Grantham. The neighbouring villages are Aisby, Oasby, and Heydour.

== History ==
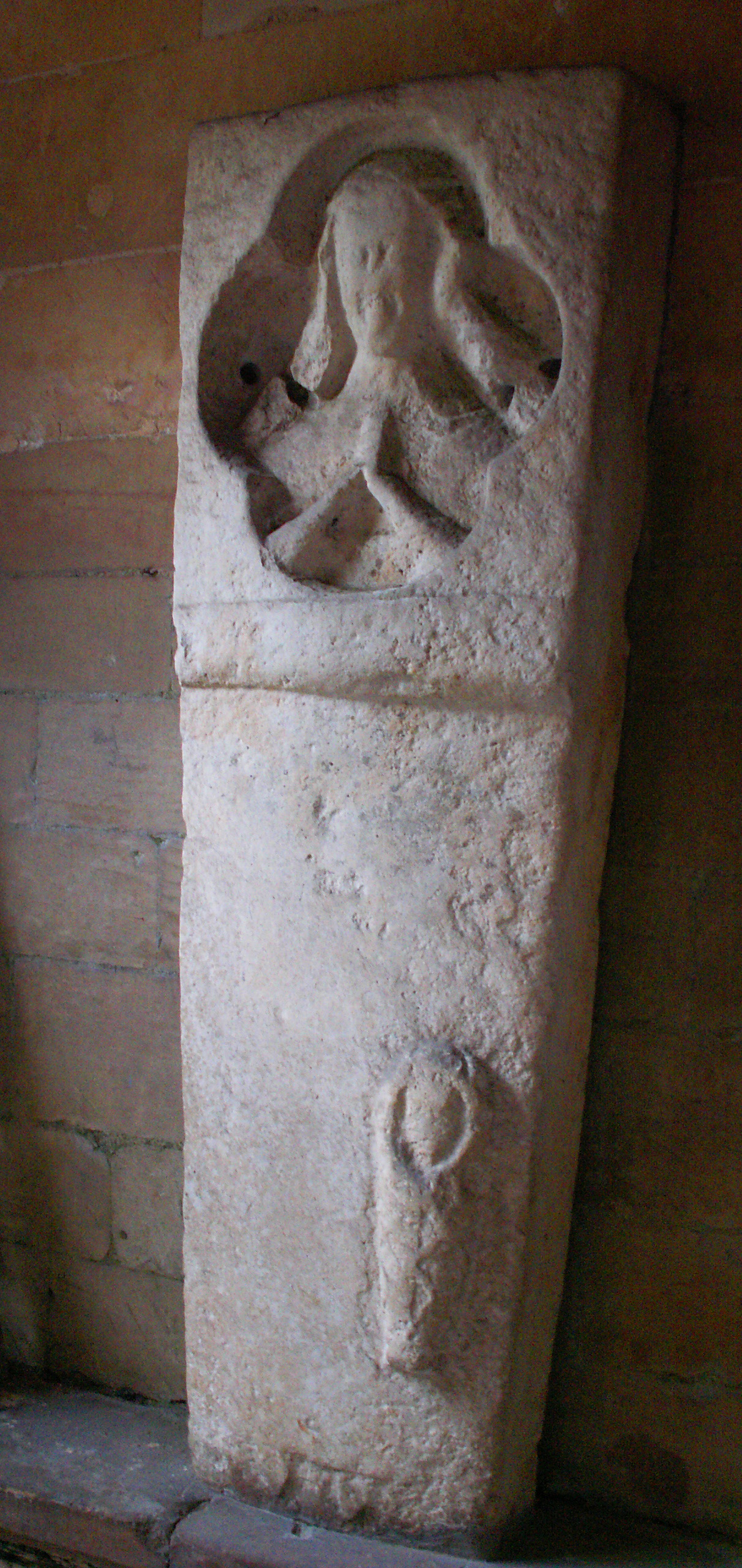
Tomb cover in St Batholomew's Church

According to A Dictionary of British Place Names, Welby means a "farmstead or village by a spring or stream", combining the Old English "wella" for a stream, with Old Scandinavian "by" for a "farmstead, village or settlement".

Welby is recorded in the 1086 Domesday account as "Wellebi", within two manors in the Threo Hundred of Kesteven. The first manor held 57 households, 7 villeins, 4 smallholders, 37 freemen, a priest, a church, a meadow of 160 acres (0.6 km^{2}), and woodland of 150 acres (0.6 km^{2}). In 1066 Queen Edith was Lord of the manor, this transferred to William I in 1086, who also became tenant in chief. The second Domesday entry shows a manor with 3 villagers, 5 freemen and 4 ploughlands, with a meadow 53 acres (0.2 km^{2}), and woodland of 80 acres (0.3 km^{2}), with the lord in 1066 being Aethelstan, son of Godram. In 1086 the lordship was transferred to Ranulf, with Guy of Craon becoming tenant in chief.

Welby's Grade I listed Anglican parish church is dedicated to St Bartholomew the Apostle. The church originates from the 13th century and is mainly Early English, but with a Perpendicular clerestory and porch. In 1873 the north aisle was extended and the chancel rebuilt by J. H. Hakewill, who matched the Early English style. Within the porch is a 14th-century stone tomb cover with relief depictions of a woman's head and shoulders, within a quatrefoil recess, along with a shrouded baby. It was originally sited in the graveyard.

The former rectory is also a listed building. It was designed by the Grantham architect Cornelius Sherborne.

In 1885 Kelly's Directory reported a Wesleyan chapel, built in 1866, and a school and four almshouses founded in 1780 by William Welby; a further school for 70 pupils had been built in 1869. The main crops grown were wheat, barley, oats and turnips, within a parish area of 2,661 acres (11 km^{2}). The 1881 population was 390. The lord of the manor and owner of the parish land was Sir William Earle Welby-Gregory DL, JP, of Denton Hall. Kellys also noted two public houses, the Red Lion and Waggon and Horses, 12 farmers, 4 graziers, a butcher, shoemaker, shopkeeper, carrier, coal dealer, wheelwright, beer retailer, harness maker and a blacksmith.

== Community ==
St Bartholomew's Church belongs to the Loveden Deanery of the Diocese of Lincoln. The incumbent is Rev. Georgina Machell.

The village road sign includes images of St Bartholomew's Church and of a cricketer; Welby previously had a village cricket team.

Welby's present-day public house is the Crown and Anchor.
