= Loveden =

- Deanery
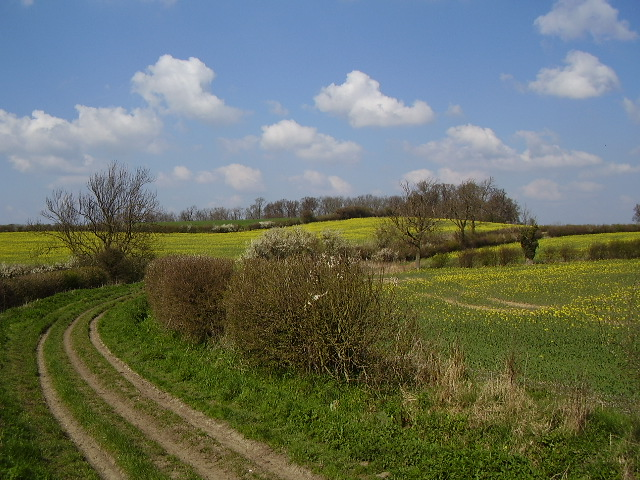
- Loveden Hill, alleged meeting place of the wapentake

- Location in Lincolnshire, north of Grantham and west of Sleaford
- Coordinates: 53.03°N 0.65°W
- OS grid reference: SK9048
- Country: England
- County: Lincolnshire
- Diocese: Diocese of Lincoln
- Website: www.loveden.org.uk

Loveden is a deanery of the Diocese of Lincoln, England, and a former wapentake.

Loveden is located broadly to the North of Grantham and includes the villages from Long Bennington in the west to Culverthorpe in the east, and from Welby in the south as far north as Welbourn. Brandon is roughly in the centre.

Loveden Hill is locally supposed to be the meeting place for the early Wapentake summons, and is the site of both Roman and extensive Anglo-Saxon archaeology.

The name is used for an STD telephone exchange, code 01400.
