= List of scheduled monuments in South Kesteven =

South Kesteven shown within Lincolnshire and England

South Kesteven is a local government district in Lincolnshire, England, forming part of the traditional Kesteven division of the county. It includes Grantham, Stamford, Bourne and The Deepings and covers an area of 364 square miles (943 km^{2}). The 2011 census reported a population of 133,788 people. The administrative centre of the district is Grantham.

A scheduled monument is a nationally important archaeological site or monument which is given legal protection by being placed on a list (or "schedule") by the Secretary of State for Culture, Media and Sport; Historic England takes the leading role in identifying such sites. The legislation governing this is the Ancient Monuments and Archaeological Areas Act 1979. The term "monument" can apply to the whole range of archaeological sites, and they are not always visible above ground. Such sites have to have been deliberately constructed by human activity. They range from prehistoric standing stones and burial sites, through Roman remains and medieval structures such as castles and monasteries, to later structures such as industrial sites and buildings constructed for the World Wars or the Cold War.

There are 92 scheduled monuments in South Kesteven. Some of the oldest are Neolithic, Bronze Age or Iron Age including hill forts and bowl barrows. The Romano-British period is represented with several sites including the town of Ancaster and sections of major Roman engineering works such as the Car Dyke and Ermine Street. Religious sites are represented by Sempringham Priory, which was the founding location of the only purely English religious order, the Gilbertines; the list also includes Witham Preceptory, a Knights Templar preceptory between North and South Witham, and several friaries in the ancient town of Stamford. More recent sites include several motte-and-bailey castles such as Bytham Castle and many village and churchyard standing crosses dating to the Middle Ages. The most recent monuments include two stone arch bridges built in the 16th and 17th centuries, and a village pump and milestone constructed near Normanton circa 1800.

Three of the sites are located in more than one jurisdiction. The Deeping Gate Bridge crosses the River Welland into Cambridgeshire, the Neolithic settlement site east of Uffington and Barnack station straddles the boundary between Lincolnshire and Cambridgeshire, and Kennulph's Stone is a tripoint boundary marker at the intersection of South Kesteven, South Holland and the City of Peterborough.

Except where noted, the monuments are listed below using the titles given in the Historic England data sheets.

== Monuments ==
Name	Location	Type	Completed (Note: The date given is the date used by Historic England as significant for the initial building or that of an important part in the structure's description.)	Grid ref. (Note: The grid reference is based on the British national grid reference system, sometimes known as OSGB36, used by the Ordnance Survey.) Geo-coordinates	Notes	Entry number (Note: The "List Entry Number" is a unique number assigned to each listed building and scheduled monument by Historic England.)	Image	Ref.
Allington village cross	Allington	Standing cross	15th century	SK 85680 40219; 52°57′09″N 0°43′34″W	Remains of a 15th century limestone cross. The base and socket stone are from the original cross; the lower shaft was added in the late 19th century and the upper shaft in the 20th century. The cross is a Grade II listed building.	1012412	Allington village cross	
Ancaster Roman settlement	Ancaster	Roman town	Romano-British	SK 98266 43502; 52°58′48″N 0°32′16″W	1st century Roman fort built on an earlier Iron Age settlement near the junction of Ermine Street and King Street. A town later grew around the site of the original fortification.	1005004	Ancaster Roman settlement	
Ancaster village cross	Ancaster	Standing cross	14th century	SK 98405 43843; 52°58′58″N 0°32′09″W	Remains of a 14th century stone cross. The cross base is a Grade II listed building.	1009222	Ancaster village cross	
Area of medieval town by Barnhill House	Stamford	Medieval town	Middle Ages	TF 02733 07212; 52°39′11″N 0°28′58″W	Medieval town located near a spot where Ermine Street forded the River Welland, possibly founded as result of population displacement from the Romano-British settlement at Great Casterton. First mentioned in Anglo-Saxon records from the 7th century, in the late 9th/early 10th centuries it was one of the five Danish burhs. Later the site of a Norman castle and a medieval town wall.	1004971	Area of medieval town by Barnhill House	
Aslackby Castle	Aslackby	Moated enclosure	Middle Ages	TF 08532 30511; 52°51′40″N 0°23′22″W	Site of a moated enclosure and a possible fish pond, visible only from cropmarks. Now believed to be a manorial complex rather than a castle.	1004952	Aslackby Castle	
Austin Friars Priory	Stamford	Monastery	Middle Ages	TF 02516 06853; 52°38′59″N 0°29′10″W	Augustinian friary, founded 1343, on a site previously occupied by Friars of the Sack. The friary was dissolved in 1538. The only remaining aboveground traces are spoil heaps from a 1712 excavation of the site. Material from the priory, including a gargoyle, is believed to have been re-used in Hopkin's Hospital, a nearby 18th-century almshouse.	1005054	Austin Friars Priory	
Barrow SW of Stroxton, on parish boundary	Stroxton	Round barrow	Bronze Age	SK 88501 30758; 52°52′01″N 0°41′12″W	Barrow on parish boundary between Wyville cum Hungerton and Little Ponton and Stroxton, part of the Ponton Heath Barrow Cemetery. Visible only as a slight ridge less than .05 metres (2.0 in). The site has been added to the Heritage at Risk Register due to risk from arable ploughing.	1004999	Upload Photo	
Bassingthorpe Manor moated site	Bassingthorpe	Moated enclosure	Middle Ages	SK 96656 28435; 52°50′41″N 0°33′59″W	Moat at the former site of Bassingthorpe Manor. The house was moved in the 16th century to a site immediately north of the moat.	1016475	Upload Photo	
Bennington Grange moated site	Long Bennington	Monastic grange	Middle Ages	SK 83734 40765; 52°57′28″N 0°45′18″W	Surviving traces of a monastic grange, including a moat and fish ponds. This site was used either for the support of an alien priory of Savigny Abbey located in nearby Long Bennington, or possibly the Gilbertine priory of St Catherine outside Lincoln.	1018867	Upload Photo	(Note: Historic England and PastScape state that this site was a grange of Long Bennington Priory; the Lincolnshire County Council states this was a grange of St Catherine's.)
Bourne Castle	Bourne	Motte-and-bailey castle	Middle Ages	TF 09340 19899; 52°45′56″N 0°22′51″W	Earthworks remaining from a Norman motte and double bailey castle next to the Bourne Eau. The castle was built by Baldwin FitzGilbert at a site reputed to have been the home of Hereward the Wake and was destroyed after being used by Oliver Cromwell's troops in 1645. The area is now an open space known as Wellhead Park; the only apparent surviving above ground masonry are arrow slits in a building known as Shippon Barn.	1005023	Bourne Castle	
Bowl barrow 210m SSW of The Limes / Bowl barrow 220m south of The Limes	Horbling	Bowl barrow	Bronze Age	TF 117 346; 52°53′52″N 0°20′25″W	Two bowl barrows, separately scheduled, on either side of the Horbling to Billingborough road. The mounds apparently postdate the signs of ridge and furrow cultivation surrounding them and it is possible they are archery butts.	1009988; 1009997	Upload Photo	
Bowl barrow 450m north west of St Guthlac's Church	Little Ponton	Bowl barrow	Bronze Age	SK 92242 32606; 52°52′59″N 0°37′50″W	Bowl barrow approximately 50 metres (160 ft) in diameter and 2 metres (6 ft 7 in) high. Could possibly be a spoil tip from a nearby gravel pit.	1013900	Bowl barrow 450m north west of St Guthlac's Church	
Brazenose College, Stamford	Stamford	Medieval university	14th century	TF 03372 07320; 52°39′14″N 0°28′24″W	Site of a university founded by disaffected members of Brasenose College, Oxford in the early 14th century; suppressed by Edward III in 1334. The area is now occupied by the Stamford School. The school grounds, and the gate which originally included the door knocker which gave the college its name, are separately scheduled. The gate and retaining walls are listed as Grade I.	1004972; 1005008	Brazenose College, Stamford More images	(Note: This entry was created by combining two entries from the National Heritage List for England—"Site of Brazenose College (1004972)" and "Brazenose Gate (1005008)".)
Bronze Age saltern	Billingborough	Saltern	Bronze Age	TF 13249 33307; 52°53′07″N 0°19′06″W	Bronze Age saltern, visible as a mound and ditch. The site is one of the earliest known salt-making works in England. This monument has been placed on the Heritage at Risk Register due to the risk of animal burrowing.	1004961	Upload Photo	
Car Dyke, south of Dyke	Dyke	Roman drainage system	Romano-British	TF 10505 21709; 52°46′54″N 0°21′47″W	Section of watercourse, previously thought to be a Roman canal, now proved to part of a fen drainage system.	1004959	Car Dyke, south of Dyke More images	
Careby Wood camp	Careby Aunby and Holywell	Hill fort	Iron Age	TF 04004 15601; 52°43′41″N 0°27′41″W	Iron Age multivallate hill fort.	1003613	Careby Wood camp	
Castle Bytham Castle, associated town defences and ponds	Castle Bytham	Motte-and-bailey castle	Middle Ages	SK 99040 18358; 52°45′14″N 0°32′02″W	11th century motte-and-bailey castle; destroyed by Henry III in 1221 during a rebellion by William de Fortibus. A second castle built on the site was destroyed in the 15th century during the Wars of the Roses.	1014681	Castle Bytham Castle, associated town defences and ponds More images	
Castle Dyke moated site	Aunby	Moated enclosure	Middle Ages	TF 00801 14255; 52°43′00″N 0°30′33″W	Manorial complex associated with the de Colville family of Castle Bytham.	1019097	Castle Dyke moated site	
Castle Hill	Hough-on-the-Hill	Motte-and-bailey castle	Middle Ages	SK 92403 46440; 53°00′26″N 0°37′28″W	Motte-and-bailey castle situated on a natural hill. The Saxon-built Church of All Saints lies within the precincts of the former bailey, as well as a school built in 1867.	1003571	Castle Hill	
Castle Hills ringwork and bailey	Heydour	Ringwork castle	Middle Ages	TF 00735 39704; 52°56′43″N 0°30′08″W	Ringwork castle with outer bailey and moat at the site of a manorial complex.	1019977	Upload Photo	
Causewayed camp	Barholm	Causewayed enclosure	Neolithic	TF 09032 10280; 52°40′45″N 0°23′19″W	Cropmark traces of a prehistoric causewayed enclosure, consisting of two concentric circuits approximately 10 metres (33 ft) apart.	1005486	Upload Photo	
Causewayed camp	Uffington	Causewayed enclosure	Neolithic	TF 05361 07967; 52°39′33″N 0°26′37″W	Cropmark traces of a prehistoric causewayed enclosure, consisting of two concentric circuits approximately 8 metres (26 ft) apart. The site has been placed on the Heritage at Risk Register due to the risk from arable ploughing.	1004938	Upload Photo	
Churchyard cross, All Saints' churchyard	Westborough	Standing cross	15th century	SK 85011 44283; 52°59′21″N 0°44′06″W	15th century limestone cross in the yard of All Saints' church. The cross is a Grade II listed building.	1009211	Churchyard cross, All Saints' churchyard	
Churchyard cross, St Andrew's churchyard	Denton	Standing cross	14th century	SK 86534 32499; 52°52′59″N 0°42′56″W	Surviving base of 14th century limestone cross in the yard of St Andrew's church. The cross is a Grade II listed building.	1009207	Churchyard cross, St Andrew's churchyard	
Churchyard cross, St Mary's churchyard	Marston	Standing cross	16th century	SK 89284 43704; 52°59′00″N 0°40′18″W	Medieval limestone cross in the yard of St Mary's church, converted to a sundial in the 16th century. The structure is a Grade II listed building.	1009209	Churchyard cross, St Mary's churchyard	
Churchyard cross, St Mary's churchyard	North Witham	Standing cross	14th century	SK 92788 21864; 52°47′11″N 0°37′32″W	Surviving base of 14th century limestone cross in the yard of St Mary's church. The cross is a Grade II listed building.	1009205	Upload Photo	
Churchyard cross, St Michael's churchyard	Edenham	Standing cross	14th century	TF 06194 21804; 52°47′00″N 0°25′37″W	Surviving portion of 14th century limestone cross in the yard of St Michael's church. The cross is a Grade II listed building.	1009202	Churchyard cross, St Michael's churchyard	
Churchyard cross, St Nicholas' churchyard	Gunby	Standing cross	14th century	SK 91274 21546; 52°47′02″N 0°38′53″W	Surviving portion of 14th century limestone cross in the yard of St Nicholas' church. The cross is a Grade II listed building.	1009206	Upload Photo	
Churchyard cross, St Peter's churchyard	Claypole	Standing cross	14th century	SK 84564 48974; 53°01′53″N 0°44′26″W	14th century limestone cross in the yard of St Peter's church, refurbished in the early 20th century as a memorial to World War I. The cross is a Grade II listed building.	1011798	Churchyard cross, St Peter's churchyard	
Churchyard cross, St Swithun's churchyard	Long Bennington	Standing cross	16th century	SK 84355 43866; 52°59′08″N 0°44′42″W	Surviving portion of 16th century limestone cross in the yard of St Swithun's church. The cross is a Grade II listed building.	1011800	Churchyard cross, St Swithun's churchyard	
Churchyard cross, St Vincent's churchyard	Caythorpe	Standing cross	14th century	SK 93889 48550; 53°01′34″N 0°36′06″W	Limestone cross in the yard of St Vincent's Church. The socket stone and a portion of the shaft date to the 14th century; the remainder is a 1906 restoration. The cross is a Grade II listed building.	1009225	Churchyard cross, St Vincent's churchyard	
Cistercian grange	Ropsley	Monastic grange	Middle Ages	SK 98617 36536; 52°55′02″N 0°32′05″W	Cropmark traces of a monastic grange used for the support of Vandey Abbey in Grimsthorpe.	1005038	Upload Photo	
Conduit House, Market Place	Grantham	Water supply	16th century	SK 91260 35917; 52°54′47″N 0°38′40″W	Marketplace water supply, originally installed by the Greyfriars in the 14th century. The present structure was built in 1597 and restored several times afterwards. The building is listed as Grade II.	1005016	Conduit House, Market Place	
Corby Glen market cross	Corby Glen	Market cross	14th century	SK 99907 25009; 52°48′48″N 0°31′09″W	Market cross, originally built in the 14th century with alterations in the 18th and 20th centuries. The cross is a Grade II listed building.	1009204	Corby Glen market cross	
Corby Castle	Corby Glen	Moated motte	Middle Ages	SK 99990 25125; 52°48′52″N 0°31′04″W	Moated motte, sometimes referred to as Corby Castle, near the Church of St John the Evangelist. A surviving portion of the gatehouse southwest of the motte, separately scheduled, is now part of a Grade II-listed 18th-century barn.	1004928; 1005001	Corby Castle	(Note: This entry was created by combining two entries from the National Heritage List for England—"Remains of medieval gatehouse (1004928)" and "Corby moated mound (1005001)".)
Decoy pond 350m south of Aslackby Decoy Farm	Pointon and Sempringham	Decoy pond	post-Middle Ages	TF 14075 30802; 52°51′45″N 0°18′25″W	Decoy pond, visible as cropmarks, used for the trapping of waterfowl.	1016472	Decoy pond 350m south of Aslackby Decoy Farm	
Deeping Gate Bridge	between Deeping St James and Peterborough	Arch bridge	17th century	TF 15069 09494; 52°40′15″N 0°17′59″W	Limestone arch bridge over the River Welland between Deeping St James and Peterborough. The bridge is a Grade II* listed building.	1003767	Deeping Gate Bridge More images	
Denton village cross	Denton	Standing cross	14th century	SK 86594 32528; 52°53′00″N 0°42′53″W	Remains of 14th century limestone village cross, now in the front garden of Denton House (also known as Leys House, or The Leys). The cross is a Grade II listed building.	1009213	Upload Photo	
Dovecote at Barholm Old Hall	Barholm	Dovecote	circa 1600	TF 08862 10706; 52°40′59″N 0°23′28″W	Dovecote east of Barholm Old Hall. The structure is a Grade II* listed building. The structure has been placed on the Heritage at Risk Register due to the risk of collapse.	1018683	Upload Photo	
Dunsby village cross	Dunsby	Standing cross	Middle Ages	TF 10587 26864; 52°49′41″N 0°21′36″W	Remains of medieval village cross, constructed of limestone.	1009201	Upload Photo	
Earthworks of Car Dyke in Park Wood, 175m east of King Street (A15)	Thurlby	Roman drainage system	Romano-British	TF 10522 16116; 52°43′53″N 0°21′53″W	Segment of the Car Dyke, a Roman fen drainage system.	1009999	Earthworks of Car Dyke in Park Wood, 175m east of King Street (A15) More images	
Ermine Street, section S of Quarry Farm	Stamford	Roman road	Romano-British	TF 00979 07982; 52°39′37″N 0°30′30″W	Section of the Roman road Ermine Street, visible as earthworks and cropmarks, next to the old Great North Road.	1005031	Upload Photo	
Five barrows NW of Heath Farm	Great Ponton	Round barrows	Bronze Age	SK 88693 30050; 52°51′38″N 0°41′03″W	Group of round barrows visible as cropmarks and slight earthworks, part of the Ponton Heath Barrow Cemetery. These are the survivors of a larger group, several of which were destroyed by ironstone quarrying in the 1950s. The site has been placed on the Heritage at Risk Register due to the risk from arable ploughing.	1004998	Five barrows NW of Heath Farm	
Folkingham Castle	Folkingham	Ringwork and bailey castle	Middle Ages	TF 07487 33567; 52°53′20″N 0°24′14″W	Moated ringwork castle with bailey, later the site of a house of correction.	1005021	Folkingham Castle	
Fulbeck village cross	Fulbeck	Standing cross	14th century	SK 94774 50378; 53°02′32″N 0°35′16″W	Village cross. The base dates to the 14th century, while the shaft and cross were added in a 19th-century restoration. The structure is a Grade II listed building.	1009223	Fulbeck village cross	
Gelston village cross	Gelston	Standing cross	15th century	SK 91301 45324; 52°59′51″N 0°38′28″W	Remains of limestone village cross, located on the village green. The structure is a Grade II listed building.	1009217	Gelston village cross	
Grantham market cross	Grantham	Market cross	13th century	SK 91291 35941; 52°54′47″N 0°38′38″W	Standing cross in Grantham marketplace. The base is believed to be medieval in origin while the remainder is from various 18th- to 20th century restorations. The structure is a Grade II listed building.	1009212	Grantham market cross More images	
Greyfriars Gate	Stamford	Gatehouse	14th century	TF 03577 07457; 52°39′18″N 0°28′13″W	Surviving gatehouse of a Franciscan friary, founded before 1230 and dissolved in 1538. The grounds are now occupied by Stamford and Rutland Hospital.	1005006	Greyfriars Gate	(Note: PastScape notes that the sites of the Stamford Greyfriars and Whitefriars friaries have typically been reversed in previous references. This is reflected in the National Heritage List for England, which has the sites confused.)
Harlaxton village cross	Harlaxton	Standing cross	14th century	SK 88446 32662; 52°53′03″N 0°41′13″W	Remains of a 14th century village cross, refurbished in the early 19th century. The structure is a Grade II listed building.	1009208	Harlaxton village cross More images	
The Hermitage moated site, 400m north east of Corby Pasture Farm	Irnham	Moated enclosure	Middle Ages	TF 01093 26466; 52°49′35″N 0°30′04″W	Medieval moated enclosure. Surviving traces include earthworks and a fish pond.	1016969	The Hermitage moated site, 400m north east of Corby Pasture Farm	
Honington camp	Honington	Hill fort	Iron Age	SK 95412 42335; 52°58′12″N 0°34′51″W	Iron Age multivallate hill fort, situated on a plateau. A hoard of Roman coins was discovered here in 1691.	1005019	Honington camp	
Iron Age and Roman settlement including a saltern on Hall Meadow	Deeping St James	Saltern	Iron Age and Romano-British	TF 16357 11484; 52°41′19″N 0°16′48″W	Saltern used in both Iron Age and Romano-British periods for salt production in The Fens.	1009998	Upload Photo	
Iron Age settlement	Honington	Settlement	Iron Age	SK 94801 44352; 52°59′17″N 0°35′21″W	Iron Age, possible Roman, settlement visible only as cropmarks. The eastern portion of the site was destroyed by the now-abandoned Lincoln & Nottingham Railway.	1004939	Iron Age settlement	
Kenulph's stone, also called Kennulph's stone or St Kennulph's stone	Deeping St James, Crowland and Newborough	Tripoint boundary marker	Middle Ages, refurbished 1817	TF 20980 09193; 52°40′01″N 0°12′45″W	Originally one of several crosses erected circa 1200 to mark the boundaries of Crowland Abbey and named after its first abbot. In 1817, a commission established to set the boundary between the Parts of Holland and Kesteven used the cross as the southernmost point of its boundary and placed a new stone on the old base. The structure is a Grade II listed building.	1005040	Kenulph's stone, also called Kennulph's stone or St Kennulph's stone More images	
Knights Templar preceptory, watermill and fishponds	Temple Hill, between North and South Witham	Knights Templar preceptory	Middle Ages	SK 92815 20556; 52°46′29″N 0°37′32″W	Knights Templar preceptory, founded in the 12th century and deserted in the 14th century when the order was suppressed. Excavation in the 1960s revealed traces of an extensive complex, including a watermill on the River Witham, fish ponds, and a forge.	1007688	Knights Templar preceptory, watermill and fishponds	
Medieval settlement remains at Shillingthorpe Park	Southwest of Braceborough	Settlement	Middle Ages	TF 07188 11394; 52°41′23″N 0°24′56″W	Abandoned medieval settlement on north bank of West Glen River. Includes earthwork traces of a moated enclosure and two furlongs of ridge and furrow cultivation.	1018685	Upload Photo	
Moated site NE of Sempringham House Farm	Sempringham	Moated enclosure	Middle Ages	TF 12936 32968; 52°52′56″N 0°19′23″W	Moated enclosure, possibly a grange of Sempringham Priory. The Car Dyke passes through the site.	1005013	Moated site NE of Sempringham House Farm	
Norman arch at No 11 St Mary's Hill	Stamford	Postern gate	Middle Ages	TF 03030 06997; 52°39′03″N 0°28′42″W	12th-century arch, thought to be part of a postern gate in the town wall. The adjacent house, which incorporates the arch, is listed as Grade II.	1005005	Norman arch at No 11 St Mary's Hill	
Norman manor house	Boothby Pagnell	Manor house	Middle Ages	SK 97053 30660; 52°51′53″N 0°33′35″W	Surviving portion of Norman manor house with 16th- to 19th-century alterations. The structure is a Grade I listed building.	1005055	Norman manor house More images	
Pump and milestone	Normanton	Village pump and milestone	18th or 19th century	SK 94901 46358; 53°00′22″N 0°35′14″W	Village pump and milestone on the main Grantham to Lincoln road. The structure is a Grade II listed building.	1004929	Pump and milestone	
Ring Dam medieval fishpond	Ropsley	Fish pond	Middle Ages	SK 99690 33756; 52°53′31″N 0°31′11″W	Medieval fish pond on East Glen River, first mentioned in sources in 1335. The northern portion was infilled by 1843, and a portion was diverted to a sheep wash.	1019976	Ring Dam medieval fishpond	
Rippingale village cross	Rippingale	Standing cross	14th century	TF 09855 27823; 52°50′12″N 0°22′14″W	Surviving portion of 14th century limestone village cross. The structure is a Grade II listed building.	1009200	Upload Photo	
Roman marching camp	Ancaster	Roman marching camp	Romano-British	SK 97953 44520; 52°59′21″N 0°32′32″W	Roman marching camp, or castra, located northwest of the present village of Ancaster. The site has been placed on the Heritage at Risk Register due to the risk from arable ploughing.	1004958	Upload Photo	
Roman settlement and drove at Fen Farm	Horbling	Roman settlement and drove	Romano-British	TF 16525 34526; 52°53′44″N 0°16′09″W	Romano-British settlement of at least five farmsteads, built on a wide roddon in The Fens. The site is also the junction of two droves.	1013482	Upload Photo	
Roman settlement by Fen Road, south of Poplar Farm	Pointon and Sempringham	Roman settlement and drove	Romano-British	TF 15817 31375; 52°52′03″N 0°16′51″W	Romano-British settlement of two or three farmsteads, built on a wide roddon in The Fens. The site is also the location of a livestock drove.	1010000	Upload Photo	
Roman site, Priors Meadow	Deeping St James	Roman settlement	Romano-British	TF 16959 09621; 52°40′18″N 0°16′18″W	Site of a possible Roman settlement east of Deeping St James. Fragments of a Roman bronze ritual crown, as well as 2nd-century Samian ware fragments, were found here in the 1960s. The site has been placed on the Heritage at Risk Register due to the risk from arable ploughing.	1004985	Roman site, Priors Meadow	
Round Hills earthwork	Ingoldsby	Earthworks	Iron Age, possibly medieval	SK 99188 30787; 52°51′56″N 0°31′41″W	Mound of uncertain date, possible an Iron Age univallate hill fort or medieval enclosure. Finds at the site include worked flint and Roman pottery, and old aerial photographs showed signs of ridge and furrow cultivation.	1005039	Round Hills earthwork	
Old St James' Church	Woolsthorpe-by-Belvoir	Church	Middle Ages	SK 83729 32986; 52°53′16″N 0°45′25″W	Medieval church, destroyed in 1643 by Roundheads during the siege of Belvoir Castle. The cemetery remains, though the church is only a pile of rubble.	1003679	Old St James' Church	
St Leonard's Priory	Stamford	Monastery	Middle Ages	TF 03883 07297; 52°39′12″N 0°27′57″W	Benedictine priory, founded in the 12th century as a cell of Durham Cathedral and dissolved in 1538. A part of the nave and north arcade survives and is a Grade I listed building.	1007690	St Leonard's Priory More images	
St Michael's Priory rere-dorter	Stamford	Reredorter	Middle Ages	TF 02787 06471; 52°38′46″N 0°28′56″W	A reredorter, or latrine; the only surviving portion of a large Benedictine nunnery founded in the 12th century and dissolved in 1536. Forms part of an underground chamber beneath Stamford Junior School.	1007811	Upload Photo	
St Peter's Church	Stamford	Church	Middle Ages	TF 02723 07025; 52°39′04″N 0°28′59″W	Site of church mentioned in the Domesday Book. The building was raided by Lancastrian forces during the Wars of the Roses; demolished in 1560 when its parish was amalgamated with All Saints'.	1004974	St Peter's Church	
Saucer barrow 100m west of All Saints' Church	Westborough	Saucer barrow	Bronze Age	SK 84918 44301; 52°59′22″N 0°44′11″W	Rare example of a saucer barrow dating to the Early Bronze Age.	1013899	Saucer barrow 100m west of All Saints' Church	
Saxon cross in churchyard of parish church, South Stoke	Stoke Rochford	Standing cross	Middle Ages	SK 92005 27335; 52°50′08″N 0°38′08″W	Three portions of stone crosses with Anglo-Saxon carvings discovered when the village of North Stoke was demolished in the 19th century. Re-erected in churchyard of St Andrew and St Mary.	1005014	Upload Photo	
Sempringham Priory	Sempringham	Gilbertine priory	Middle Ages	TF 10399 32386; 52°52′39″N 0°21′40″W	Founding priory of the Gilbertine Order, established in the 12th century and dissolved in 1538. Surviving traces include a fish pond complex and the priory church, now the parish church of St Andrew, a Grade I listed building. Other structures on the site include a tithe barn and holy well, both listed as Grade II.	1005481	Sempringham Priory More images	
Settlements on Rippingale Fen	Rippingale	Romano-British settlement	Romano-British	TF 15623 28282; 52°50′23″N 0°17′06″W	Two adjacent areas, separately scheduled, containing cropmark traces of a Romano-British settlement. Findings include pottery and quern-stones. The sites have been placed on the Heritage at Risk Register due to the risk from arable ploughing.	1004976; 1004977	Settlements on Rippingale Fen	(Note: This entry was created by combining two entries from the National Heritage List for England—"Settlement between Rippingale Running Dike and Long Drove (1004976)" and "Settlement between Long Drove and Dowsby Drain (1004977)".)
Settlement site at Greatford	Greatford	Iron Age or Roman settlement	Iron Age or Romano-British	TF 08943 11520; 52°41′26″N 0°23′23″W	Cropmark traces of several ditched enclosures, prehistoric or Romano-British in date. The site has been placed on the Heritage at Risk Register due to the risk from arable ploughing.	1004957	Upload Photo	
Settlement site E of Greatford village	Greatford	Iron Age or Roman settlement	Iron Age or Romano-British	TF 09797 11937; 52°41′38″N 0°22′37″W	Cropmark traces of several ditched enclosures, prehistoric or Romano-British in date. The site has been placed on the Heritage at Risk Register due to the risk from arable ploughing.	1004934	Upload Photo	
Settlement site E of Uffington and Barnack Station	between Uffington and Barnack	Neolithic, Bronze Age, Iron Age, and Roman settlement	Neolithic to Bronze Age	TF 07971 06411; 52°38′41″N 0°24′20″W	Extensive complex of ancient buildings dating from the late Neolithic, including round barrows, a cursus, and hengiform monuments. The site also has traces of later occupation, including a Roman villa.	1006792	Settlement site E of Uffington and Barnack Station	
Site discovered by aerial photography NE of village	Northeast of Barholm	Roman farmstead or villa	Romano-British	TF 09476 11411; 52°41′22″N 0°22′54″W	Cropmark traces of a Roman farmstead or villa. Pottery fragments from the site date to the 4th century.	1005480	Upload Photo	
Shrunken medieval village	Sapperton	Shrunken medieval village	Middle Ages	TF 02140 33878; 52°53′34″N 0°29′00″W	Traces of medieval desertion east of the present village of Sapperton, including earthworks and signs of ridge and furrow cultivation.	1005483	Shrunken medieval village	
Stamford Castle	Stamford	Motte-and-bailey castle	Middle Ages	TF 02833 06982; 52°39′03″N 0°28′53″W	11th century Norman motte-and-bailey castle, possibly built on site of an earlier Anglo-Saxon fortification. Demolished in 1484. Surviving traces include a small section of the Great Hall and a postern gate, both listed as Grade II.	1005011	Stamford Castle	
Swinstead village cross	Swinstead	Standing cross	14th century	TF 01820 22490; 52°47′25″N 0°29′30″W	Remnant of 14th century limestone village cross. The structure is a Grade II listed building.	1009203	Swinstead village cross	
Tower Hill motte castle, Stainby	Stainby	Motte castle	Middle Ages	SK 90962 22689; 52°47′39″N 0°39′09″W	Earthwork remains of 11th century Norman motte castle.	1019527	Upload Photo	
Stamford town wall	Stamford	Defensive wall	Middle Ages	TF 02526 06998; 52°39′04″N 0°29′09″W	Two sections of town wall, separately scheduled. An intact bastion on West Street is a Grade I listed building, while a section of wall on North Street is listed Grade II. The remnants of two southern bastions on Wharf Street are listed Grade II but not scheduled.	1005007; 1005482	Stamford town wall	(Note: This entry was created by combining two entries from the National Heritage List for England—"Tower of city wall, West Street (1005007)" and "Site of town defences (North Street) (1005482)".)
Uffington Bridge	Uffington	Arch bridge	16th or 17th century	TF 06631 06926; 52°38′59″N 0°25′31″W	Stone arch bridge over the River Welland. The structure is a Grade II* listed building.	1004997	Uffington Bridge More images	
Village cross, Towngate	Market Deeping	Standing cross	14th century	TF 13298 10797; 52°40′59″N 0°19′32″W	Remaining fragments of 14th century standing cross. The structure is a Grade II listed building.	1009219	Upload Photo	
Village cross and lock-up, Deeping St James	Deeping St James	Standing cross converted to village lock-up.	15th century, converted 19th century	TF 15807 09490; 52°40′59″N 0°19′32″W	Originally a 15th century standing cross, converted in 1819 to a village lock-up. The structure is a Grade I listed building.	1009220	Village cross and lock-up, Deeping St James More images	
Westborough village cross	Westborough	Standing cross	15th century	SK 85103 44650; 52°59′33″N 0°44′01″W	Surviving limestone base of village cross. The structure is a Grade II listed building.	1009210	Westborough village cross	
Whitefriars Priory	Stamford	Monastery	13th century	TF 03484 07330; 52°39′14″N 0°28′18″W	Site of a Carmelite friary founded in 1268 and dissolved in 1538. A surviving section of wall at the southwest corner of the compound is listed as Grade II.	1004973	Upload Photo	

== See also ==
- Scheduled monuments in Lincolnshire
- Grade I listed buildings in South Kesteven
- Grade II* listed buildings in South Kesteven
