= Charles Richard Sharpe =

Recipient of the Victoria Cross (1889–1963)

Charles Richard Sharpe VC
- Born: 2 April 1889; Pickworth, Lincolnshire
- Died: 18 February 1963 (aged 73); Workington, Cumberland
- Burial place: Newport Cemetery, Lincoln
- Military career
- Allegiance: United Kingdom
- Branch: British Army
- Service years: 1905−1928
- Rank: Company sergeant major
- Units: Lincolnshire Regiment
- Conflicts: World War I
- Awards: Victoria Cross

Charles Richard Sharpe VC (2 April 1889 – 18 February 1963) was an English recipient of the Victoria Cross, the highest and most prestigious award for gallantry in the face of the enemy that can be awarded to British and Commonwealth forces.

Charles Sharpe was a farmer's boy from Pickworth, near Bourne, Lincolnshire, who ran away from home to join the army at the age of sixteen. He had served with the 2nd Battalion of the Lincolnshire Regiment in the Bermuda Garrison before the war, arriving on the Western Front with that battalion 6 November 1914.

He was an acting corporal in the 2nd Battalion, Lincolnshire Regiment, British Army and 26 years old when the following deed took place during the Battle of Aubers Ridge in the First World War for which he was awarded the VC.

For most conspicuous bravery near Rouges Bancs on 9th May, 1915.

When in charge of a blocking party sent forward to take a portion of the German trench he was the first to reach the enemy's position, and, using bombs with great determination and effect, he himself cleared them out of a trench 50 yards long.

By this time all his party had fallen, and he was then joined by four other men, with whom he attacked the enemy again with bombs and captured a further trench 250 yards long.

He later achieved the rank of company sergeant major. He left the army in 1928.

On return to civilian life, he worked at a number of jobs, notably as a physical training instructor to boys at the Hereward Camp approved school at Bourne. In the Second World War a number of bombs were dropped on the approved school, a row of wooden huts adjacent to Bourne Woods that may have been mistaken for a military camp; Sharpe was injured.

While staying in Workington with his daughter, Mrs Dorothy Foster, Sharpe died on 18 February 1963 of cerebral thrombosis after suffering a fall four days earlier and fracturing several of his ribs.

== Medal ==
His medal is held by South Kesteven District Council.

== Bibliography ==
- Batchelor, Peter; Matson, Christopher (2011). The Western Front 1915. VCs of the First World War. Stroud, Gloucestershire: The History Press. ISBN 978-0-7524-6057-4.
- Buzzell, Nora, ed. (1997). The Register of the Victoria Cross. Cheltenham, Gloucestershire: This England Alma House. ISBN 0-906324-27-0.
- Oldfield, Paul (2015). Victoria Crosses on the Western Front, April 1915–June 1916. Pen and Sword Books. ISBN 978-1783030439.
