= Owston Ferry Castle =

Castle in Lincolnshire, England

Coordinates: 53.4923°N 0.7866°W

- Owston Ferry
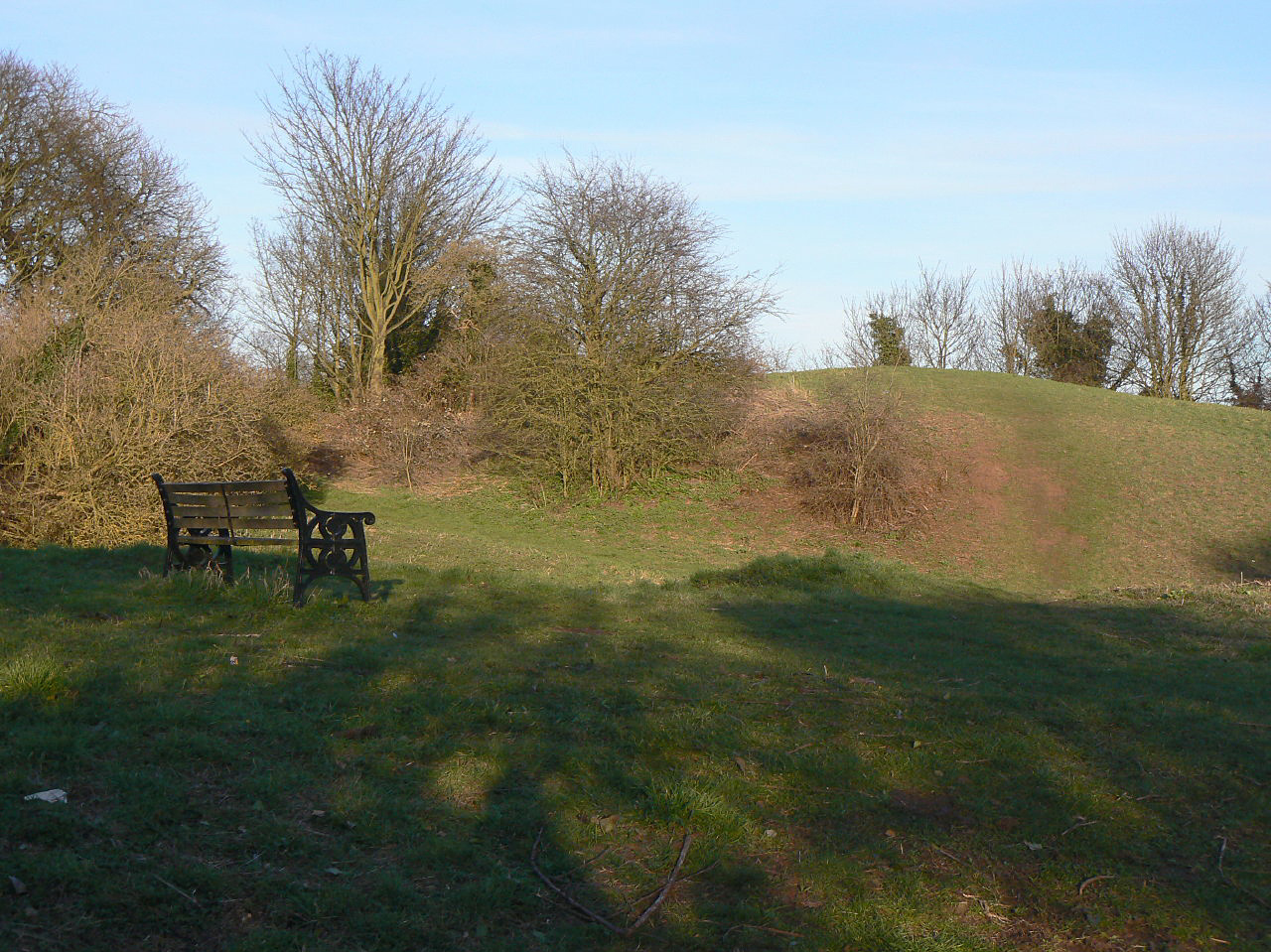

Site information
- Controlled by: North Lincolnshire Council
- Open to the public: yes
- Condition: ruin

Location
- Grid reference: grid reference SE806002

Site history
- Built: c. 1070 rebuilt: 1174
- Demolished: 1095, 1174
- Battles/wars: Revolt of 1173–74

Owston Ferry Castle (also known as Kinnard's Ferry Castle) was in the village of Owston Ferry in Lincolnshire, England.

It is thought that the original castle on this site was erected soon after the Norman Conquest but that it was dismantled in 1095. It was rebuilt in 1173 by Roger de Mowbray to support Prince Henry in the conflict with his father Henry II who subsequently had the castle destroyed.

The site of the motte remains as a broad grassy mound. The surrounding area is now a Local Nature Reserve.

The castle was designated a scheduled monument in 1951.
