= Baron Coleville =

Extinct barony in the Peerage of England

The Parish of Castle Bytham, Lincolnshire

Baron Coleville was a title of nobility in the Peerage of England.

Walter de Colville of Castle Bytham in Lincolnshire was summoned in 1264 to a parliament convened by Simon de Montfort, who held King Henry III of England captive. Walter was captured by Prince Edward later that year and was forced to redeem his confiscated lands. While participation in this rebel parliament is not considered to have created a hereditary peerage, Walter's great-grandson, Robert de Coleville, sat in Parliament from 1331 and later received a royal writ that by modern practice is viewed to have made him Lord Coleville. The title became extinct on the death of his son Robert at the age of 6 in 1370, his heirs being the descendants of two sisters of his grandfather, granddaughters of the Walter summoned by Montfort.

== The Castle ==
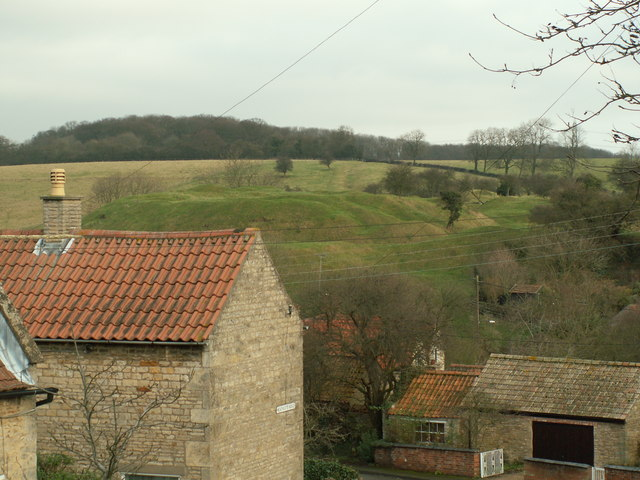
The mound upon which the castle stood

The castle itself after which the Barony took its name is now a mound of stones sitting upon a mound. It was originally owned by the Northumbrian earl Morcar, who tried to stop William the Conqueror around the time of the Norman invasions of 1066. He was imprisoned and Odo, the half-brother of William took over the castle and completed it. It was destroyed during the Wars of the Roses between 1455 and 1485.
