= Ponton Heath Barrow Cemetery =

Archaeological site in Lincolnshire, England

- Location within Lincolnshire
- 52.862°N 0.679°W
- Type: Barrow cemetery
- Periods: Bronze Age
- Location: Lincolnshire
- Region: East Midlands

Scheduled monument
- Official name: Five barrows NW of Heath Farm
- Reference no.: 1004998

Scheduled monument
- Official name: Barrow SW of Stroxton, on parish boundary
- Reference no.: 1004999

The Ponton Heath Barrow Cemetery is a group of at least eleven Middle Bronze Age round barrows south of Grantham, in the South Kesteven district of Lincolnshire, England. Five of the barrows were destroyed by ironstone quarrying in 1959; the remaining six are scheduled monuments. The sites have been placed on the Heritage at Risk Register.

== Location ==
The cemetery is located on Ponton Heath, an area of high ground several miles south of the market town of Grantham. It is centred approximately 1.2 kilometres (0.75 mi) northeast of the hamlet of Hungerton and 1.5 kilometres (0.93 mi) southwest of the village of Stroxton. The centre of the area is occupied by the backfilled remains of an ironstone quarry which was active from the 1950s to the 1970s; this activity was responsible for the destruction of five barrows in 1959. Of the surviving monuments, Barrow A is located to the north of the former works, on the parish boundary between Wyville cum Hungerton and Little Ponton and Stroxton. The remaining five, Barrows B, C, F, G and H, are located on the south side of the site.

A low mound, possibly a 12th barrow, is located between and slightly to the north of Barrows C and F.

== Description ==
The surviving barrows are all located on arable farmland which is ploughed and under crop. They are only visible as slight ridges in the ground no more than .05 metres (2.0 in) high. Due to the danger of them being ploughed out, the sites have been placed on the Heritage at Risk Register.

== Excavations and investigations ==
In 1959, following the opening of Harlaxton Quarry No. 4 (or Hungerton Quarry), a rescue excavation was carried out by Ernest Greenfield of the Ministry of Works. He arrived to find much of the topsoil already stripped from the site and several of the barrows pillaged. In Barrow J he found an intact main burial chamber containing a crushed red collared urn, decorated with cord impressions, inverted over burned bone. He also found numerous secondary cremations and stone tools, leading him to classify the builders as the "Yorkshire Food Vessel Culture" in the terminology of the time.

The site also contained evidence of later Romano-British occupation. Examination of topsoil removed from the destroyed portion of the site yielded fragments of Roman Samian and grey ware pottery. The urn from Barrow J was conveyed to the Lincoln Museum; other artifacts were deposited with the Grantham Museum.

Fieldwalking of the area west of Barrow A in the 1960s and 70s also turned up a large scatter of stone tools, and a child's bronze bracelet dated to the Roman era.

== List of barrows ==
Barrows on Ponton Heath
Name	Location (Note: There are slight discrepancies in the locations of destroyed barrows between the records of Historic England and the Lincolnshire County Council. This table uses the locations given by Historic England.)	Description and finds
Barrow A	SK 88501 30758; 52°52′01″N 0°41′12″W	Intact, currently a scheduled monument.
Barrow B	SK 88693 30050; 52°51′38″N 0°41′03″W	Intact, currently a scheduled monument.
Barrow C	SK 88758 30039; 52°51′38″N 0°40′59″W	Intact, currently a scheduled monument.
Barrow D	SK 88990 30370; 52°51′48″N 0°40′47″W	Destroyed, unexcavated. Barrow was being covered by a large spoil heap from quarrying and there was no time for excavation.
Barrow E	SK 89070 30870; 52°52′05″N 0°40′42″W	Destroyed. Hastily excavated prior to destruction, classified as an inhumation burial with no skeletal remains. Finds included pottery and a flint knife and fabricator.
Barrow F	SK 89104 30067; 52°51′39″N 0°40′41″W	Intact, currently a scheduled monument.
Barrow G	SK 89172 30091; 52°51′39″N 0°40′37″W	Intact, currently a scheduled monument.
Barrow H	SK 89230 30117; 52°51′40″N 0°40′34″W	Intact, currently a scheduled monument.
Barrow J	SK 89330 30390; 52°51′49″N 0°40′28″W	Destroyed. Was already seriously damaged when excavated. The main burial chamber was intact and included a smashed pot, decorated with cord impressions, inverted over burned bone. Also included 17 secondary cremations, some in pottery vessels.
Barrow K	SK 89390 30350; 52°51′48″N 0°40′25″W	Destroyed. The primary burial, a pit cremation with flints and pottery, had been pillaged prior to examination.
Barrow L	SK 89450 30400; 52°51′49″N 0°40′22″W	Destroyed. No finds recorded.
Possible 12th barrow	SK 88960 30110; 52°51′40″N 0°40′48″W	Low mound, identified as similar to other barrows. Not excavated or scheduled.
