= Bytham River =

Pleistocene river in England

Coordinates: 52.526°N 1.743°E

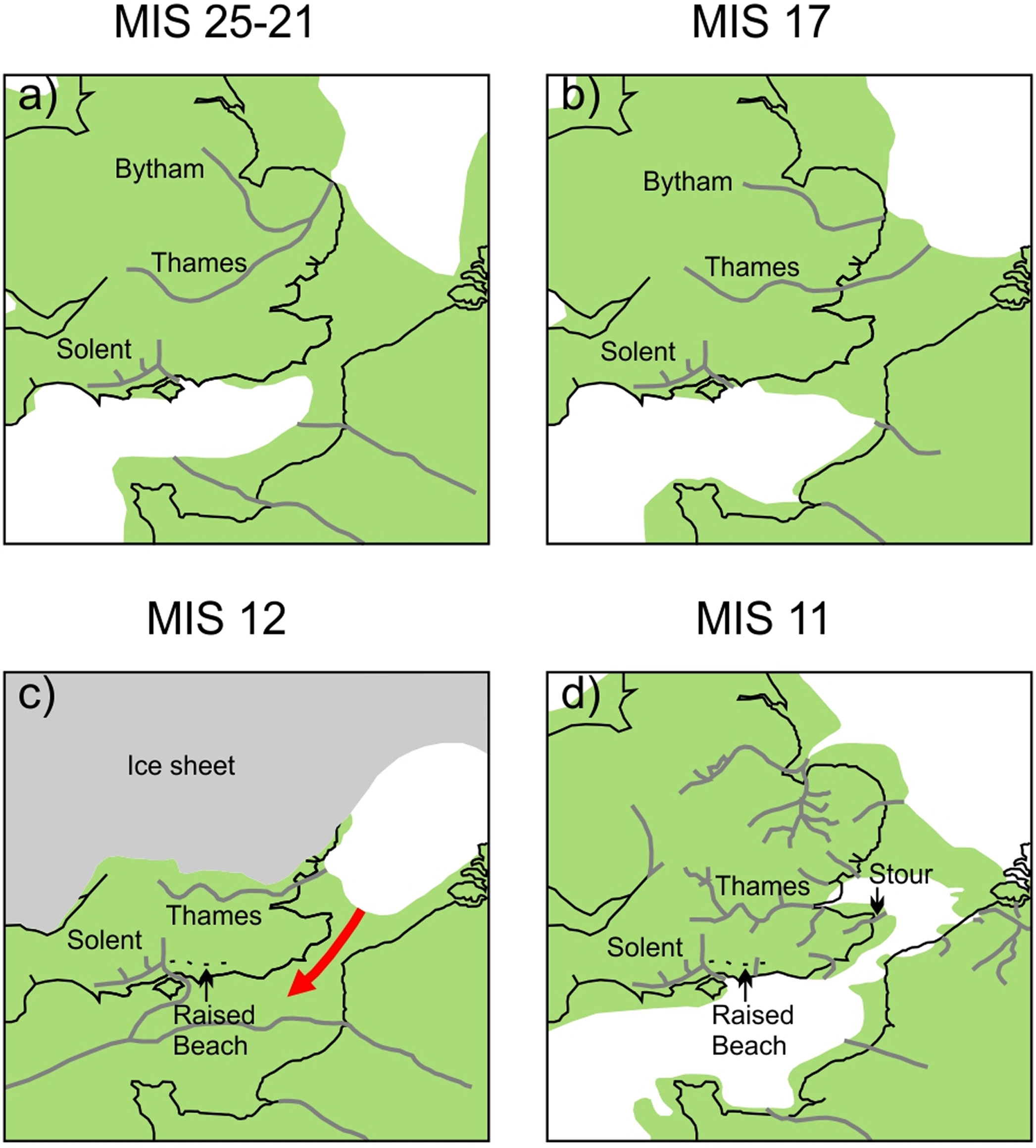
Course of the Bytham River during Marine Isotope Stages (MIS) 25-21 (prior to 900,000 years ago) and MIS 17 (c. 700,000 years ago), to its destruction Anglian Glaciation (MIS 12 c. 480-430,000 years ago) to the situation during the following Hoxnian interglacial (MIS 11, c. 425-375,000 years ago)

The Bytham River was one of the great Pleistocene rivers of central and eastern England until it was destroyed by the advancing ice sheets of the Anglian Glaciation around 450,000 years ago. The river is named after Castle Bytham in Lincolnshire, where the watercourse crossed the Lincolnshire limestone hills in a valley now buried by Anglian till. West of that location, its catchment area included much of Warwickshire, Leicestershire and Derbyshire. East of that location, the Bytham flowed across what is now the Fen Basin to Shouldham, then southward to Mildenhall, then eastward across East Anglia. It met the Proto-Thames in a delta near what is now the Norfolk/Suffolk border and flowed into the North Sea. Britain was then joined to the Continent by a land bridge and the Bytham joined the North Sea somewhere beyond the northern end of that land bridge.

Chris Stringer writes: "As the Bytham River slowed past Warren Hill [in Norfolk] towards its delta on what is now the East Anglian coast, it deposited sediments on the edge of the huge north-facing bay, into which the Rhine also flowed. The sites of Norton Subcourse in Norfolk and nearby Pakefield, just over the border in Suffolk, were probably both related to the Bytham, and they record a time when the climate of Britain was balmy and Mediterranean, and this part of East Anglia was a fertile estuarine plain."

The Anglian ice advance which followed, with its ice front reaching at least as far south as London and Birmingham, overrode all or most of the Bytham's catchment area. The course of the river was severed in the region of the Fen Basin. Following the ice retreat, the Bytham's remaining western section became part of the Trent catchment, and its remaining eastern section became a precursor of the Waveney river, running across East Anglia.

Numerous quartz rich gravel deposits, and carboniferous chert which originate from the midlands of England have formed the basis for plotting the river's course.

In the mid-2010s the existence of the Bytham was disputed. It was argued that an eastern section of the supposed river, flowing across central East Anglia, was indeed part of a pre-Anglian watercourse, but one which came from the north-west, through the Ancaster Gap in Lincolnshire. That "proto-Trent" river was severely disrupted by the Anglian glaciation. It has further been suggested that a western section of the supposed "Bytham river" was part of a post-Anglian watercourse which flowed SW-NE from Warwickshire to the North Sea via The Wash. That "proto-Soar" river was also modified by glaciation, but in that case by the later Wolstonian ice advance. Those western and eastern sections never linked up to form a "Bytham river".

A later study asserted that the refutation of the existence of the Bytham is itself "contradicted by an abundance of evidence", and that sand and gravel deposits of the proto-Soar in Leicestershire could "only have been emplaced by a river flowing eastward across East Anglia" (ie, according to this study, by a large, pre-Anglian river, the Bytham).

However, a detailed 2022 study of post-Anglian deposits in the Midlands estimates the age of the proto-Soar deposits ("Baginton sands") as around 150 ka - ie, as post-Anglian, not pre-Anglian. This reinforces the refutation hypothesis.
