= Pickworth, Lincolnshire =

Village and civil parish in the South Kesteven district of Lincolnshire, England

Coordinates: 52.8898°N 0.4544°W

Pickworth
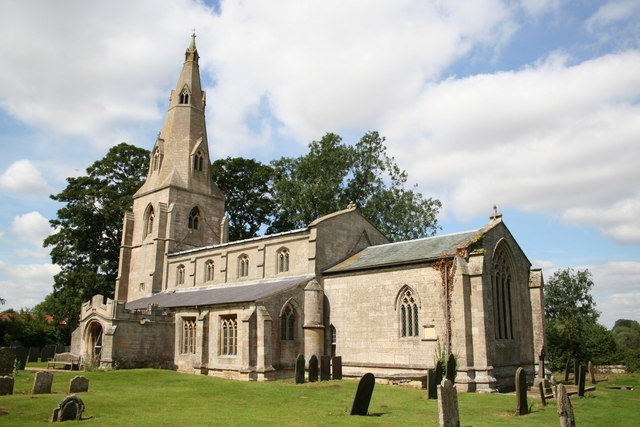
- St Andrew's parish church

- Location within Lincolnshire
- Population: 243 (2011 Census)
- OS grid reference: TF0433
  - London: 85 mi (137 km) S
- District: South Kesteven
- Shire county: Lincolnshire
- Region: East Midlands
- Country: England
- Sovereign state: United Kingdom
- Post town: Sleaford
- Postcode district: NG34
- Police: Lincolnshire
- Fire: Lincolnshire
- Ambulance: East Midlands
- UK Parliament: Grantham and Bourne

Pickworth is a village and civil parish in the South Kesteven district of Lincolnshire, England. The population of the civil parish including Braceby and Sapperton was 243 at the 2011 census. It is situated approximately 8 miles (13 km) both east from Grantham and south from Sleaford.

The 1086 Domesday Book lists Pickworth as having forty households and a church.

The Church of England parish church of Saint Andrew is a Grade I listed building built of limestone and dating from the 12th century. The 14th-century rebuilding of the church is said to date from 1356, probably by the Pickworth family. Over the chancel arch are 14th-century wall paintings dated to about 1380.

== History ==
Prince Charles visited the church on 23 November 1988, after visiting Boston.
