= Dunsby =

Village in Lincolnshire, England

Coordinates: 52.827819°N 0.360946°W

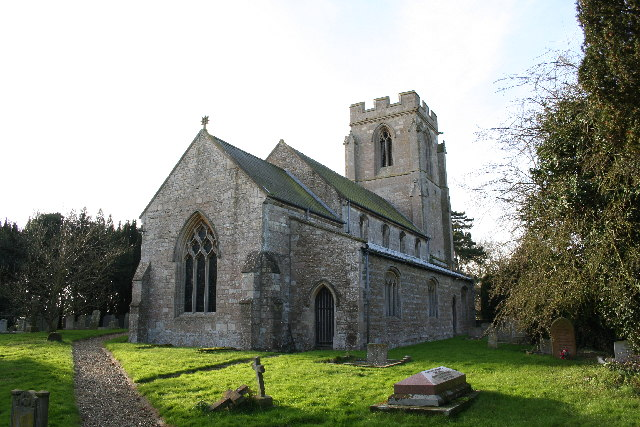
- Church of All Saints, Dunsby

- Location within Lincolnshire
- Population: 122 (2011)
- OS grid reference: TF105268
  - London: 90 mi (140 km) S
- District: South Kesteven
- Shire county: Lincolnshire
- Region: East Midlands
- Country: England
- Sovereign state: United Kingdom
- Post town: Bourne
- Postcode district: PE10
- Police: Lincolnshire
- Fire: Lincolnshire
- Ambulance: East Midlands
- UK Parliament: Grantham and Bourne

Dunsby is a small village and civil parish in the South Kesteven district of in Lincolnshire, England. It is 4 miles (6.4 km) north from Bourne, just east off the A15, and on the western edge of the Lincolnshire Fens. In 2001 it had a population of 141, reducing to 122 at the 2011 census.

The Grade I listed parish church is dedicated to All Saints. Built of ironstone and limestone, it dates from the 12th century, and was restored in 1857. The church is part of the Ringstone in Aveland group of the Deanery of Beltisloe, Diocese of Lincoln. The vicar was the Revd Dr Lynda Pugh between 2012 and 2018. The incumbent is the Revd Neil Bullen.

The village cross is a medieval scheduled monument sited at a road junction in the village, and consists of the base and 8 inches (20 cm) of shaft.

Dunsby is mentioned in the Domesday Book under the name of Dunesbe.

== Literature ==
Honniball P (2021) HISTORY OF DUNSBY, a village in South Lincolnshire and of some of the people who have lived there. Privately published 340pp.
