= Scheduled monuments in Lincolnshire =

List of scheduled monuments in the county of Lincolnshire, England

There are 588 scheduled monuments in the county of Lincolnshire, England. These protected sites date in some cases from the Neolithic period, and include barrows, artillery forts, ruined abbeys, castles, and Iron Age hill forts. In the United Kingdom, the scheduling of monuments was first initiated to ensure the preservation of "nationally important" archaeological sites and historic buildings. Protection is given to scheduled monuments under the Ancient Monuments and Archaeological Areas Act 1979.

== Notable scheduled monuments in Lincolnshire ==
Image	Name	Location	Date	Notes
	St Peter's Church, Barton-upon-Humber	53.68379°N 0.43471°W	9th/10th century	Anglo Saxon church, excavated in the 1970s and 1980s, was the focus of "the most extensive archaeological investigation ever undertaken of a British parish church".
	Coates medieval settlement	53°20′23″N 0°37′58″W	11th century	A deserted medieval village and moated site in the civil parish of Stow.
	Greyfriars, Lincoln	53.2293°N 0.5370°W	1230 AD	The oldest surviving structure in England of the Franciscan order
	High Bridge, Lincoln	53°13′42.7″N 0°32′26.4″W	mid-12 century	The oldest surviving medieval bridge in England with buildings on it.
	Horncastle Roman walls	53.2081°N 0.1155°W	late-3rd century	Six elements of the defensive wall of a Roman castra in the town of Horncastle.
	Pinchbeck Engine	52.81777°N 0.12910°W	1833	Drainage pumping station, containing the last steam driven scoop wheel left in the fens. Closed in 1952.
	Ponton Heath Barrow Cemetery	52.862°N 0.679°W	Bronze Age	Six Bronze Age round barrows, south of Grantham.
	Stow Minster	53°19′39″N 0°40′38″W	1054 AD	One of the oldest Anglo-Saxon parish churches in England.
	St Mary's Guildhall, Lincoln	53.2222°N 0.5439°W	12th century	Used as a guild hall from 1251-1547.
	St Martin's Church, Waithe	53.4874°N 0.0666°W	10th century	Anglo-Saxon church. Burial ground contains historic medieval stone cross.
	Trinity Bridge, Crowland	52.6757°N 0.168281°W	14th century	Unusual three-way stone bridge which previously spanned the River Welland.

== See also ==
- Grade I listed buildings in Lincolnshire
- List of scheduled monuments in the United Kingdom
