= Dyke, Lincolnshire =

Village in the South Kesteven district of Lincolnshire, England

Coordinates: 52.78877°N 0.36287°W

Dyke
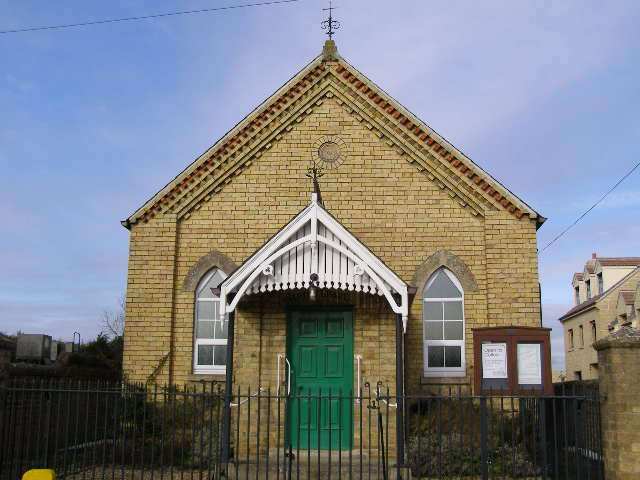
- Baptist Chapel, Dyke

- Location within Lincolnshire
- OS grid reference: TF105225
  - London: 85 mi (137 km) S
- Civil parish: Bourne
- District: South Kesteven
- Shire county: Lincolnshire
- Region: East Midlands
- Country: England
- Sovereign state: United Kingdom
- Post town: BOURNE
- Postcode district: PE10
- Dialling code: 01778
- Police: Lincolnshire
- Fire: Lincolnshire
- Ambulance: East Midlands
- UK Parliament: Grantham and Bourne

Dyke is a village in the South Kesteven district of Lincolnshire, England. It is situated less than 1 mile (1.6 km) east from the A15 road (England), and approximately 1 mile north-east from Bourne. Dyke is within Bourne civil parish.

The name Dyke arises from its lying on Car Dyke, a once much larger Roman ditch, which runs along the western edge of The Fens. The section of Car Dyke between Dyke and Bourne is a scheduled ancient monument.

For population statistics Dyke, Twenty, South Fen, and Spalding road outside Bourne are taken together; Dyke is the largest of these settlements. The 2001 census recorded a population of 1,598, falling to 1,541 at the 2011 census.

Dyke and Dyke Fen fall within the drainage area of the Black Sluice Internal Drainage Board.

A new fountain was built on the green in the centre of the village to mark the millennium.

Dyke's public house is The Wishing Well Inn.
