= Bytham Castle =

Coordinates: 52.75591°N 0.53155°W

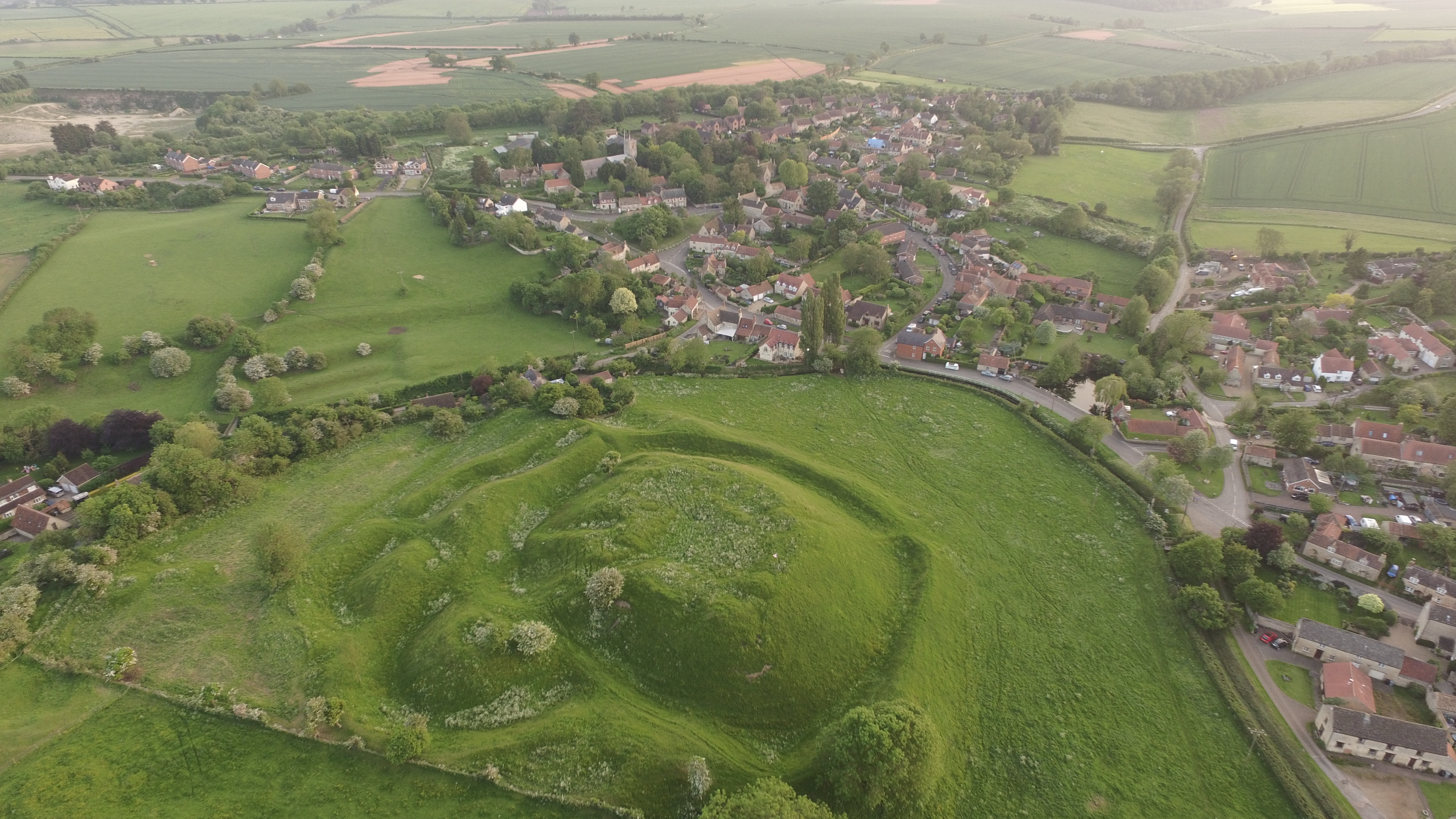
Bytham Castle aerial view

Bytham Castle was a castle in the village of Castle Bytham in Lincolnshire (grid reference SK992186.)

The castle is thought to be of early Norman origin. The earthworks, on a hill above the village, are visible but nothing of the stonework is above ground.

The site of the castle in Saxon times was owned by Morcar, also known as Morkere, who was the brother of Ealdgyth, wife of King Harold. The castle, which gave its name to the village, was built soon after the Norman Conquest of 1066, and was given by the Conqueror to his half brother Odo, Bishop of Bayeux and Earl of Kent; it was later owned by William le Gros, 1st Earl of Albemarle, and passed to the family of Coleville. During the First Barons' War it was occupied by William de Forz, 3rd Earl of Albemarle aided by William d'Aubigny, Sir Richard Siward, Henry de Hastings and William de Hastings.. In 1221, after a siege, the castle was captured by Henry III with the help of Hugh de Mortimer and William de Warenne, 5th Earl of Surrey and restored to its lord, the former rebel William de Coleville.

In the 14th century the castle was occupied by the Earls of Hereford and in 1394 the children of John of Gaunt’s son Henry Bolingbroke (later to become King Henry IV), including his eldest son Henry who was to become Henry V the victor of Agincourt, came to live at the castle with their grandmother Joan Fitzalan, Countess of Hereford.

The castle was burnt in the 15th century during the Wars of the Roses. In the 16th century John Leland described remnants of the castle: "yet remained great walls of buildings".

There is no public access to the monument. There is however a public footpath that runs alongside the castle mound and up a hill to give a reasonable view.
