= Wyville =

Village and civil parish in the South Kesteven district of Lincolnshire, England

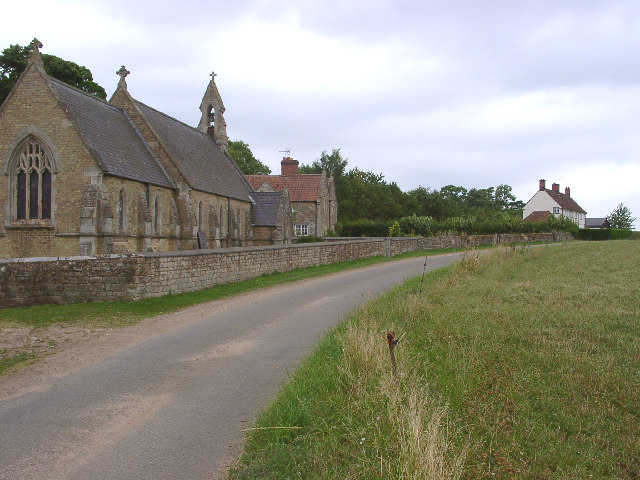
- Wyville, Lincolnshire. On the left is St Catherine's parish church, and just beyond it are Church Cottages.
- OS grid reference: SK877297
  - London: 95 mi (153 km) SSE
- District: South Kesteven
- Shire county: Lincolnshire
- Region: East Midlands
- Country: England
- Sovereign state: United Kingdom
- Post town: Grantham
- Postcode district: NG32
- Police: Lincolnshire
- Fire: Lincolnshire
- Ambulance: East Midlands
- UK Parliament: Grantham and Bourne

Wyville is a village in the civil parish of Wyville cum Hungerton, in the South Kesteven district of Lincolnshire, England, and situated approximately 5 miles (8 km) south-west from Grantham The whole parish covers about 1,670 acres (6.8 km^{2}). The population is included in the civil parish of Little Ponton and Stroxton.

The village is an ecclesiastical parish of the Harlaxton Group of the Grantham Deanery in the Diocese of Lincoln. The incumbent is Rev Keith Hanson.

== Wyville ==
52°51′14″N 0°41′42″W
Wyville is a small hamlet consisting mainly of a collection of farm buildings and a 19th-century church.

A small spring runs to the south of the hamlet, toward the Cringle Stream at Stoke Rochford, an early tributary of the River Witham.

== Hungerton ==
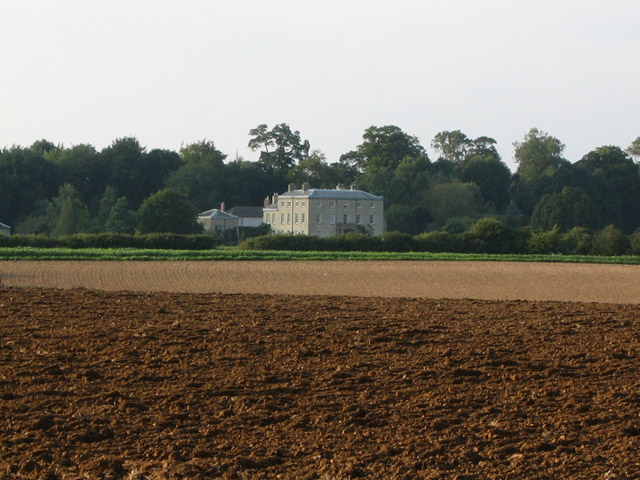
Hungerton Hall

52°51′32″N 0°41′56″W
Hungerton is a small hamlet set about a half mile northwest of Wyville. Hungerton has been the population centre of the parish in recent centuries.

== History ==
Both villages are listed in the Domesday Book of 1086, and at the time of the survey were larger than today.
St Catherine has long been associated with Wyville. Ancient stone coffins have been found on what may have been the site of the original church. The present church was built in 1858.

In 1848 Samuel Lewis described the parish as:

"WYVILL, a parish, in the union of Grantham, wapentake of Loveden, parts of Kesteven, county of Lincoln, 6 miles (N. W.) from Colsterworth; containing, with Hungerton, 137 inhabitants. The living is a discharged rectory, with that of Hungerton united; net income, £35; patron, the Bishop of Lincoln. The church is in ruins, and the inhabitants attend that at Harlaxton."

A few years later John Marius Wilson said of the parish:

"WYVILLE-WITH-HUNGERTON, a parish in Grantham district, Lincoln; 3½ miles W by S of Great Ponton r. station, and 5 SSW of Grantham. Post town, Colsterworth, under Grantham. Acres, 1,670. Real property, £1,840. Pop., 155. Houses, 28. The living is a double rectory in the diocese of Lincoln. Value, £35. Patron, the Bishop of L. The church was built in 1858."
