= Castle Bytham =

Village and civil parish in Lincolnshire, England

Coordinates: 52.75593°N 0.53559°W

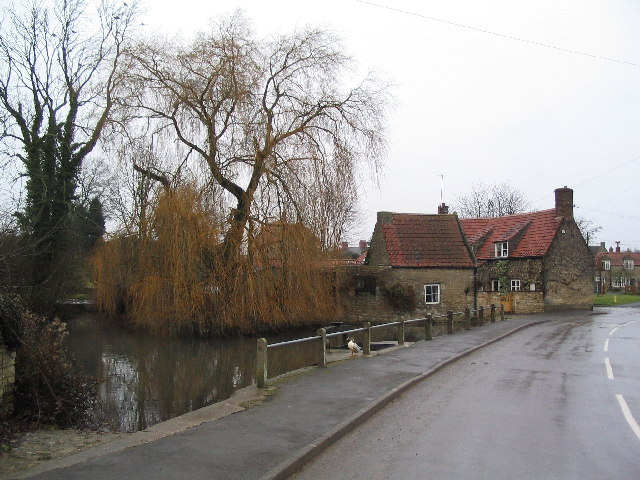
- Castle Bytham village pond

- Location within Lincolnshire
- Population: 768 (2011 census)
- OS grid reference: SK989185
  - London: 90 mi (140 km) S
- Civil parish: Castle Bytham
- District: South Kesteven
- Shire county: Lincolnshire
- Region: East Midlands
- Country: England
- Sovereign state: United Kingdom
- Post town: GRANTHAM
- Postcode district: NG33
- Dialling code: 01780
- Police: Lincolnshire
- Fire: Lincolnshire
- Ambulance: East Midlands
- UK Parliament: Rutland and Stamford

Castle Bytham is a village and civil parish of around 300 houses in South Kesteven, Lincolnshire, England. It is located 9 miles (14 km) north of Stamford and 9 miles (14 km) west of Bourne. The population was measured at 768 in 317 households at the 2011 census.

At one time the village was an important commercial centre for the surrounding agricultural communities, but it is now largely a dormitory, although a number of farming families remain with a much reduced workforce.

== History ==
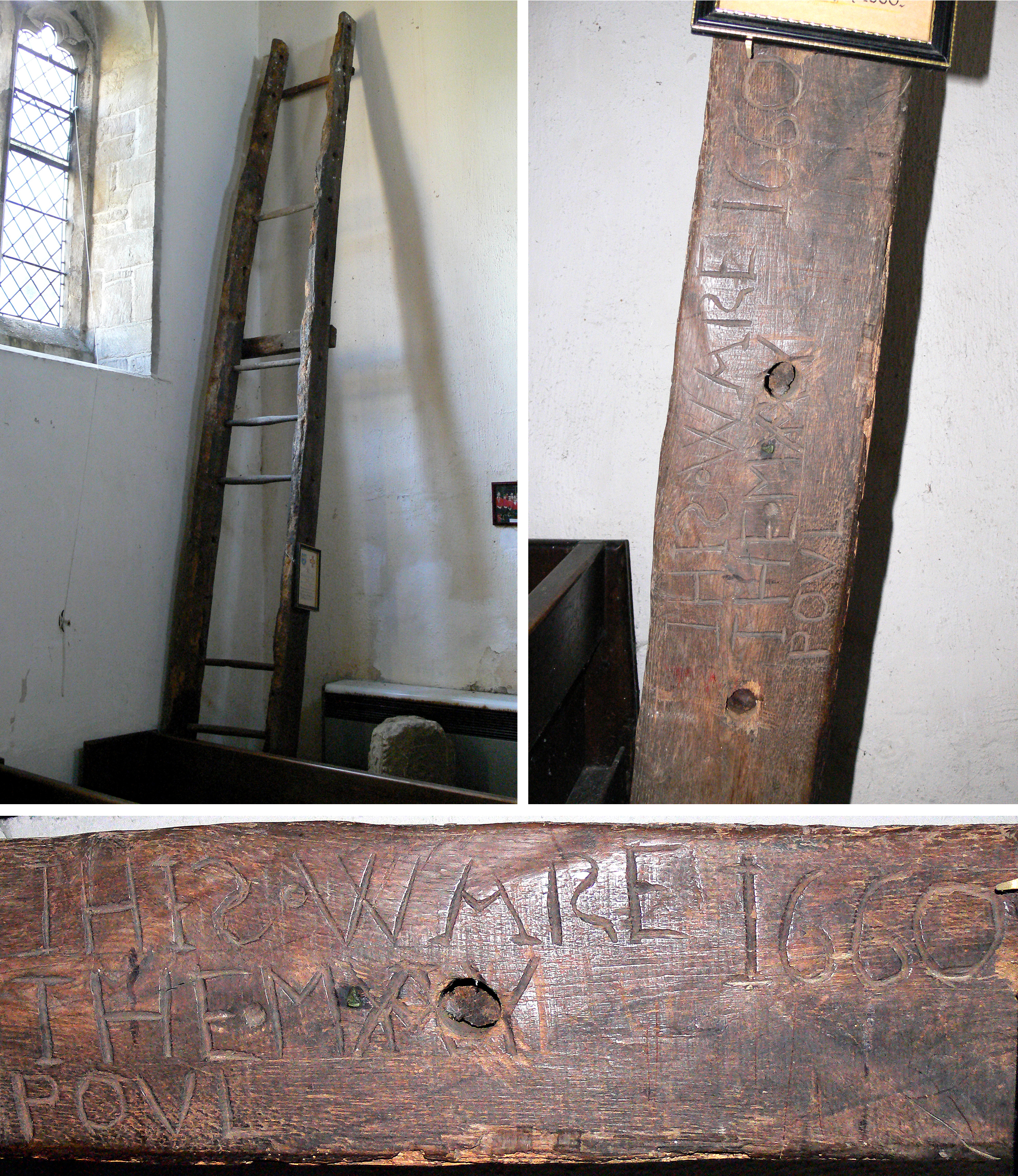
May Day celebrations, banned under the Commonwealth, were revived in 1660. The maypole at Castle Bytham was inscribed to commemorate the date when it was later cut in half for use as a ladder in the church tower

The name 'Bytham' is first recorded in 1067 (as a monastery that rapidly translated to Vaudey Abbey), and comes from the Old English word bythme meaning valley bottom or broad valley. In the Domesday survey of 1086 the village was known as West Bytham as the castle had yet to be built.

=== Castle ===
Overlooking the village is the 11th-century Bytham Castle, a Norman castle mound. The site of the castle in Saxon times was owned by Morcar, also known as Morkere, who was the brother of Ealdgyth, wife of King Harold. The castle, which gave its name to the village, was built soon after the Norman Conquest of 1066, and was given by the Conqueror to his half brother Odo, Bishop of Bayeux and Earl of Kent.

=== World War 2 ===
Morkery Wood housed a former bomb dump during the Second World War for the nearby airfields. In the early hours of 19 November 1942 Handley Page Halifax BB209 NP-G of 158 Sqn, from RAF Rufforth in North Yorkshire, crashed near Stocken Hall Farm. It had been hit by flak south-east of Paris coming back from a raid on Turin, Italy. Half the aircrew were in the RCAF.

=== 1961 air crash ===
At lunchtime on Wednesday 1 February 1961 Jet Provost 'XN460', on a flight from RAF Syerston, crashed near Cabbage Hill. Pilot Officer IF Mitchinson parachuted to Scottlethorpe, four miles away.

== Geography ==
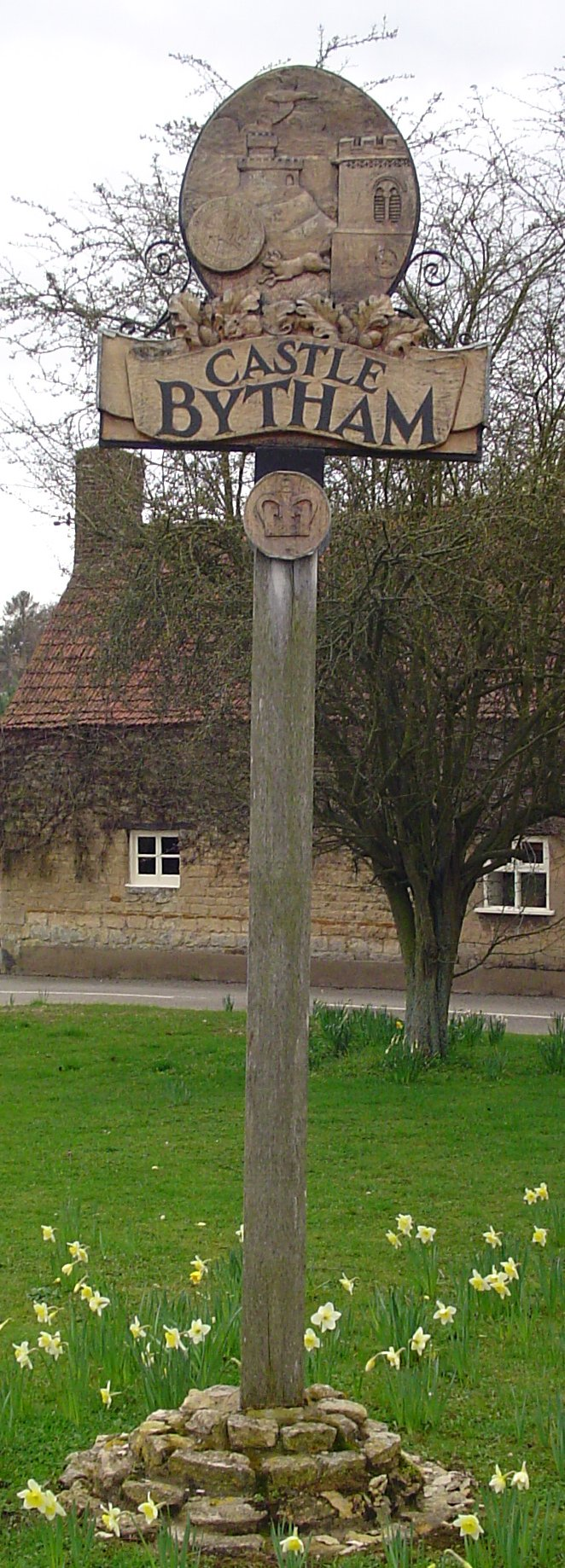
Village sign in Castle Bytham

The nearest town is Stamford (even though Castle Bytham is in the Grantham postal area, with a Nottingham postcode). It is at the apex of the NG (Grantham), LE (Rutland) and PE (Stamford) postcodes.

The village is very close to the Rutland boundary. The civil parish extends much to the north-west of the village, up to Woolley's Lane, including Red Barn Quarry, owned by Bullimores. It also extends westwards to include all of Morkery Wood (originally named Morkerhaw – named after the Saxon earl Morcar mentioned above). South of the A1 interchange to Woolley's Lane, the parish boundary is with North Witham, including Park House Farm. The eastern buildings of Stocken Hall Farm lie in the parish (with an LE15 postcode), with the rest in Stretton. To the east, Little Haw Wood is also in the parish.

Southwards, the civil parish extends to (and includes) Pillowsyke Holt, a piece of woodland near Holywell. Eastwards, the parish extends for about half a mile, where it includes the 30 acre Lawn Wood which has been a nature reserve since 1995, joining two neighbouring meadows that were donated to Lincolnshire Wildlife Trust in 1993. The meadows are a good site for buttercups and yellow rattle, and are managed to encourage butterflies, including the ringlet, and the meadow brown. The wood is mainly oak and ash, but includes field maple, midland hawthorn and the uncommon wild service tree; woodland flora such as wood anemone, woodruff and early purple orchid also found there. Fallow deer and red deer are frequently seen in the reserve.

=== Surrounding area ===
About 1 mile (2 km) to the east lies Little Bytham. The two villages used to be called West and East Bytham.

To the west, on the western side of the A1 road, is South Witham near the source of the River Witham. The village's vicar, and that of the Bythams Group, is also the wife of the vicar of South Witham.

Between the village and the A1 the Lincolnshire Wildlife Trust maintains an important wildlife reserve at Tortoiseshell Wood (which borders on to the west of the civil parish) and some of the road verges are protected for wildlife by Lincolnshire County Council. Tortoiseshell Wood is in the parish of North Witham, although the edge lies on the parish boundary.

West of the village, towards Clipsham, is a Yew Tree Avenue maintained by the Forestry Commission, the trees cut into large topiary forms.

== Community ==
The ecclesiastical parish is part of the Castle Bytham with Creeton group of the Deanery of Beltisloe.

Castle Bytham's community supports several events each year in the village hall. Every year Castle Bytham holds a midsummer fair and street market.

Castle Bytham Post Office was closed in 2008 despite local opposition.

There are two remaining public houses in the village.

=== Former railway station ===
The village had a railway station on the Midland and Great Northern Joint Railway, the remains of which can still be seen. This railway station was rather unusual, being a single platform in a deep cutting through the village. The railway station was not originally planned by the railway, but was added after considerable local lobbying. It remained open, as did the goods yard on the other side of the road, until the line closed in 1959. West of the village the line of the railway now forms a road crossing under the A1.

=== Places of worship ===
The church, started in the 12th century, and restored in 1900, is dedicated to St James and is one of a group of parishes in the rural deanery of Beltisloe. It contains an unusual memento of the English Restoration: a ladder, formerly used in the tower, with a carved inscription which reads "THIS WARE THE MAY POVL 1660" (see photograph), suggesting that May celebrations were held in the village (as they were throughout the country) to mark the Restoration of King Charles II.

There was at one time a Methodist chapel in High Street (now a private house), served by visiting ministers from Stamford. On its closure in 1972 the Methodist Circuit still sent a preacher to the village for a few years, service taking place in the parish church.

== Notable residents ==
- Trevor Lloyd-Hughes, press secretary to former prime minister Harold Wilson.

== Gallery ==
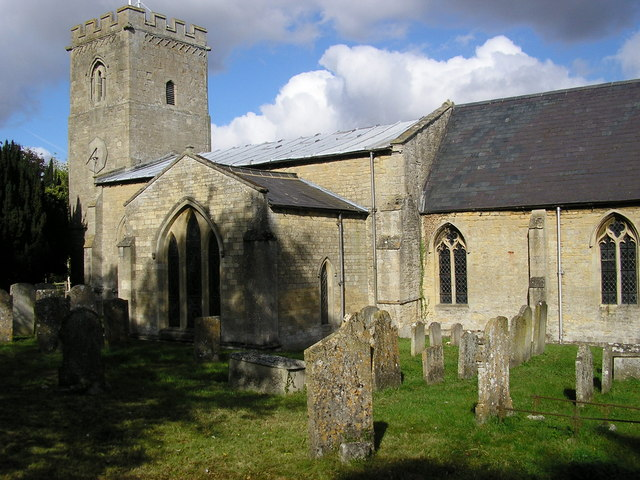
St James's Church

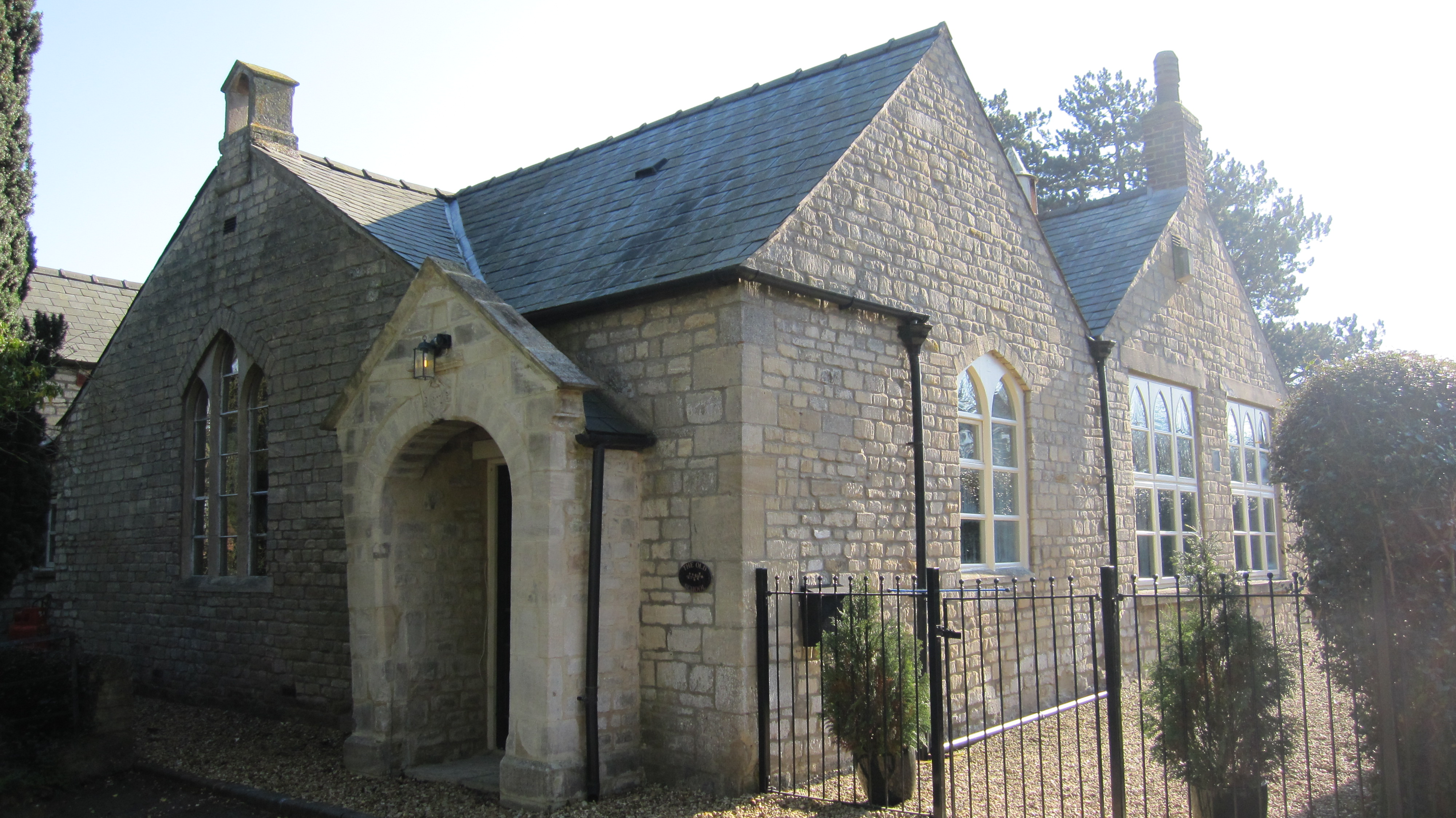
Former school

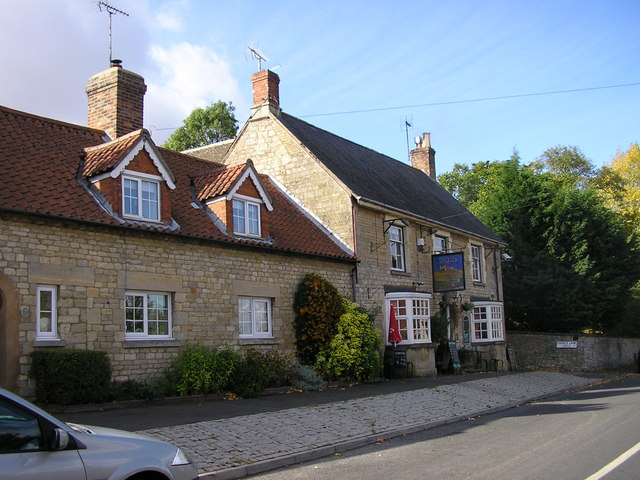
Castle Inn public house

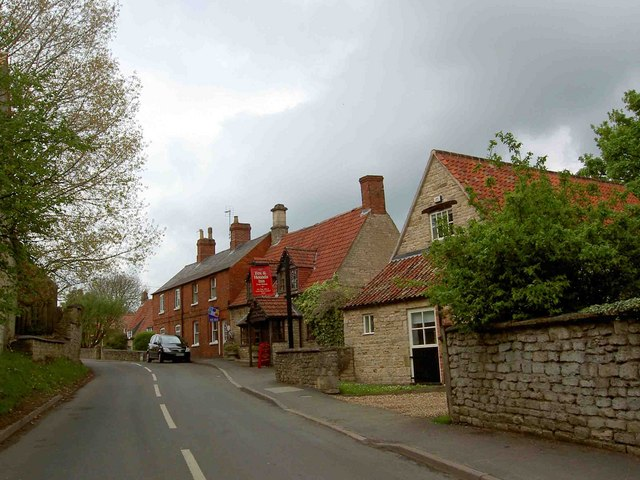
Fox and Hounds public house

== Publications ==
- Wild, John, (1871); The History of Castle Bytham: Its Ancient Fortress and Manor BiblioBazaar (2008) ISBN 0-554-79494-2 / Nabu Press (2010) ISBN 978-1-147-70286-6
- Chorlton, Martyn; Danger Area: The Complete History of RAF South Witham, 100 MU Old Forge Publishing (2003) ISBN 0-9544507-2-8

== See also ==
- Castle Bytham Quarry
- Little Bytham
- Bytham Castle
- Bytham River
