= South Kesteven =

Local government district in Lincolnshire, England

Coordinates: 52.80°N 0.50°W

South Kesteven District
- Non-metropolitan district
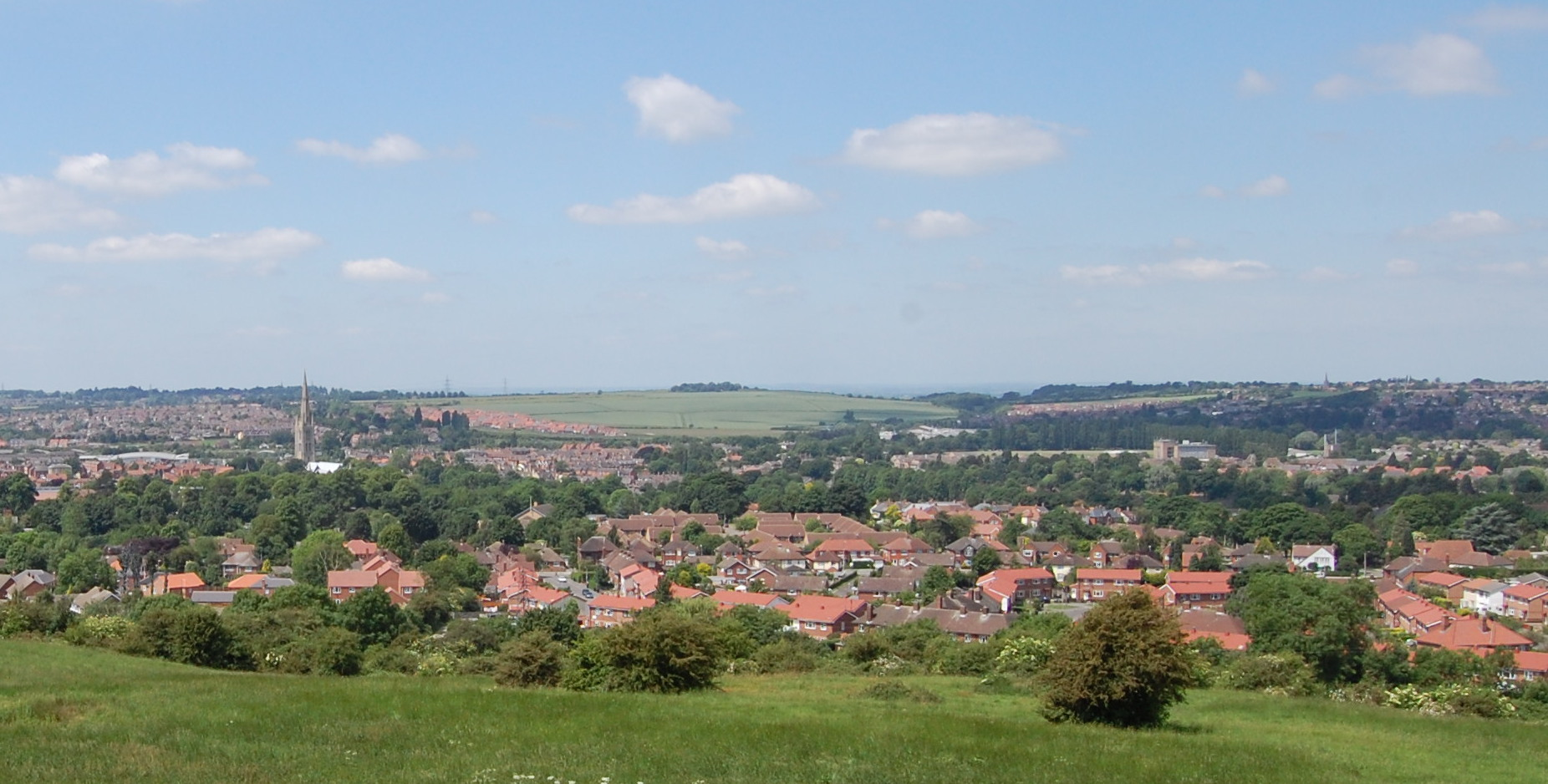
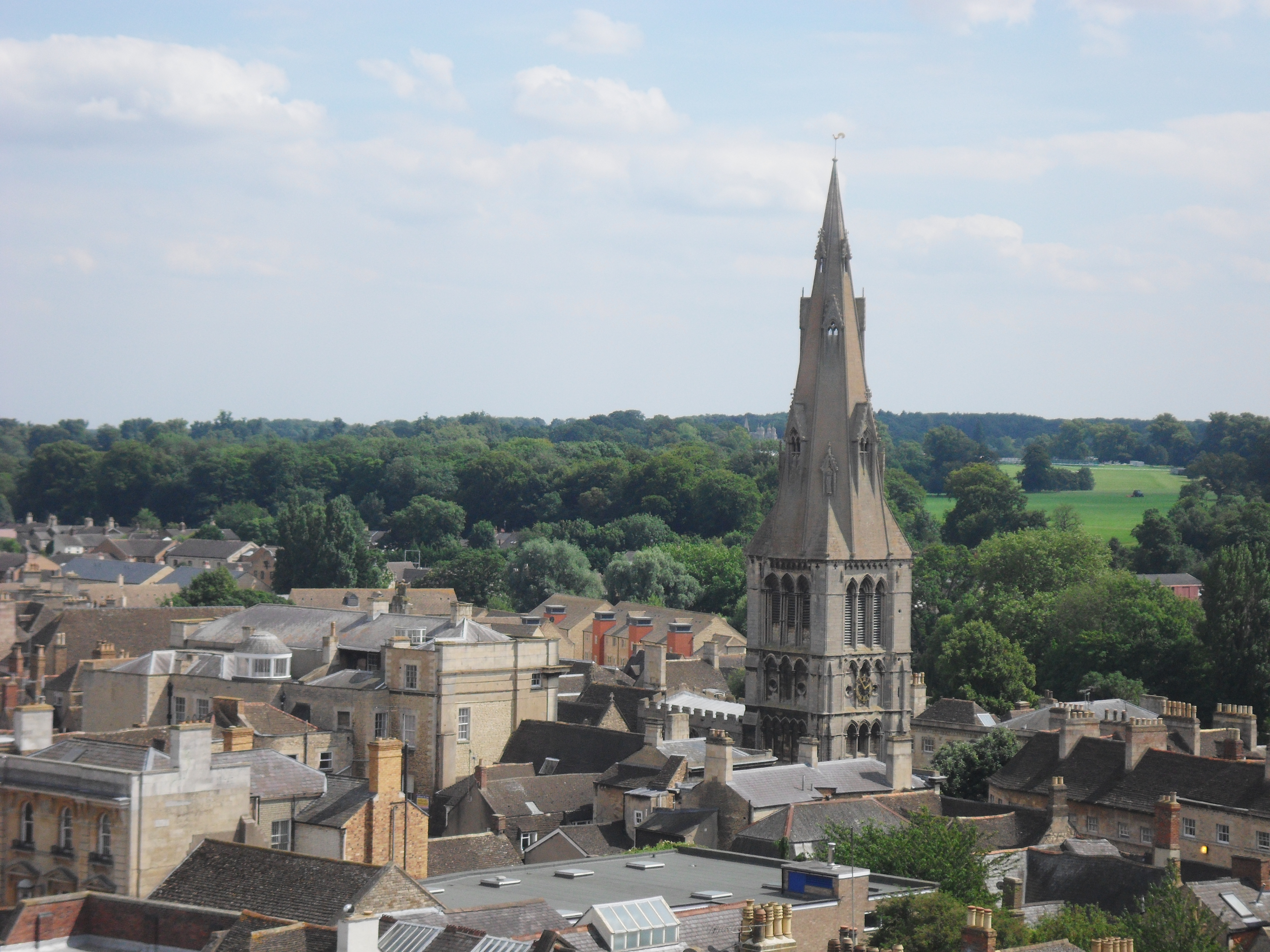
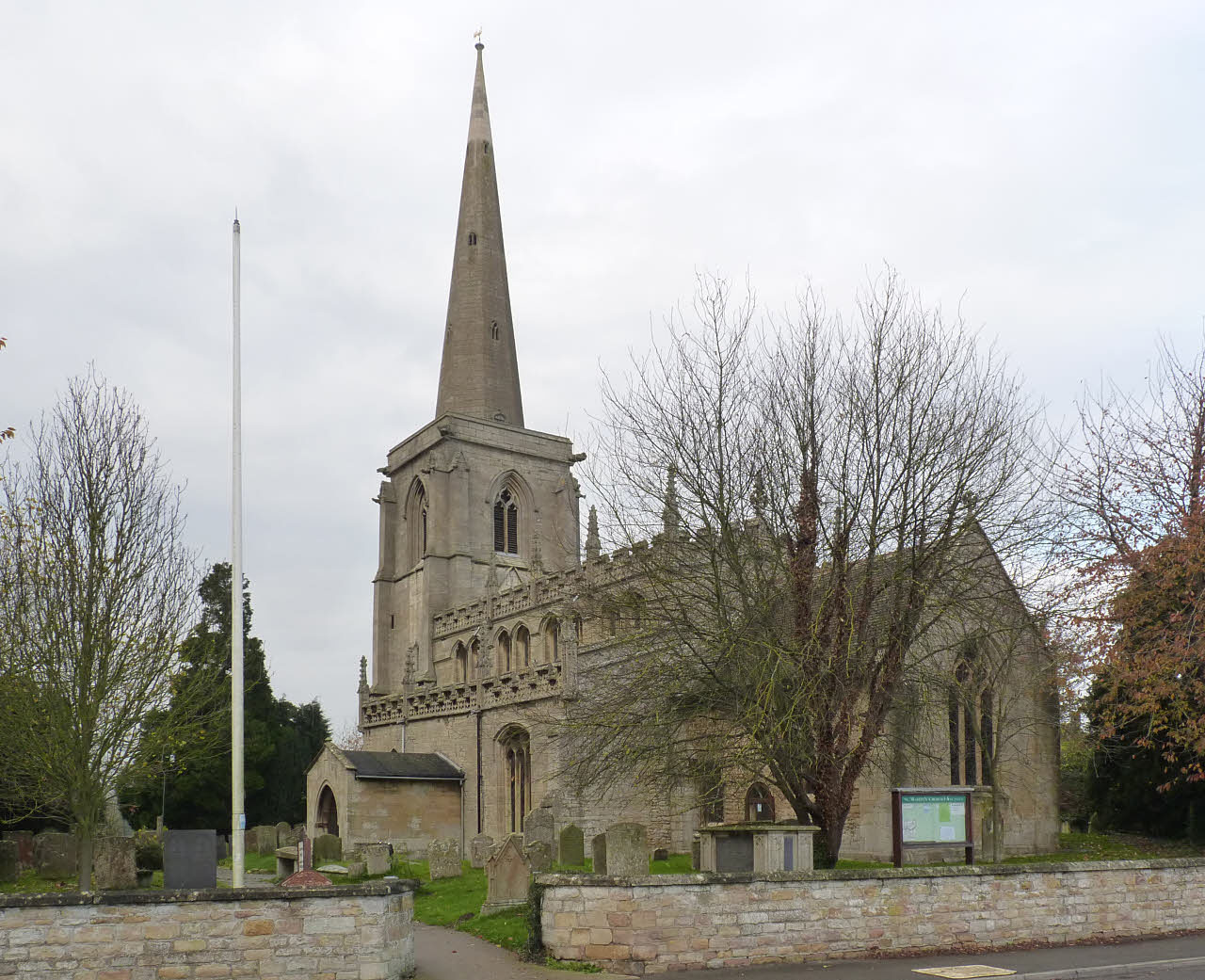
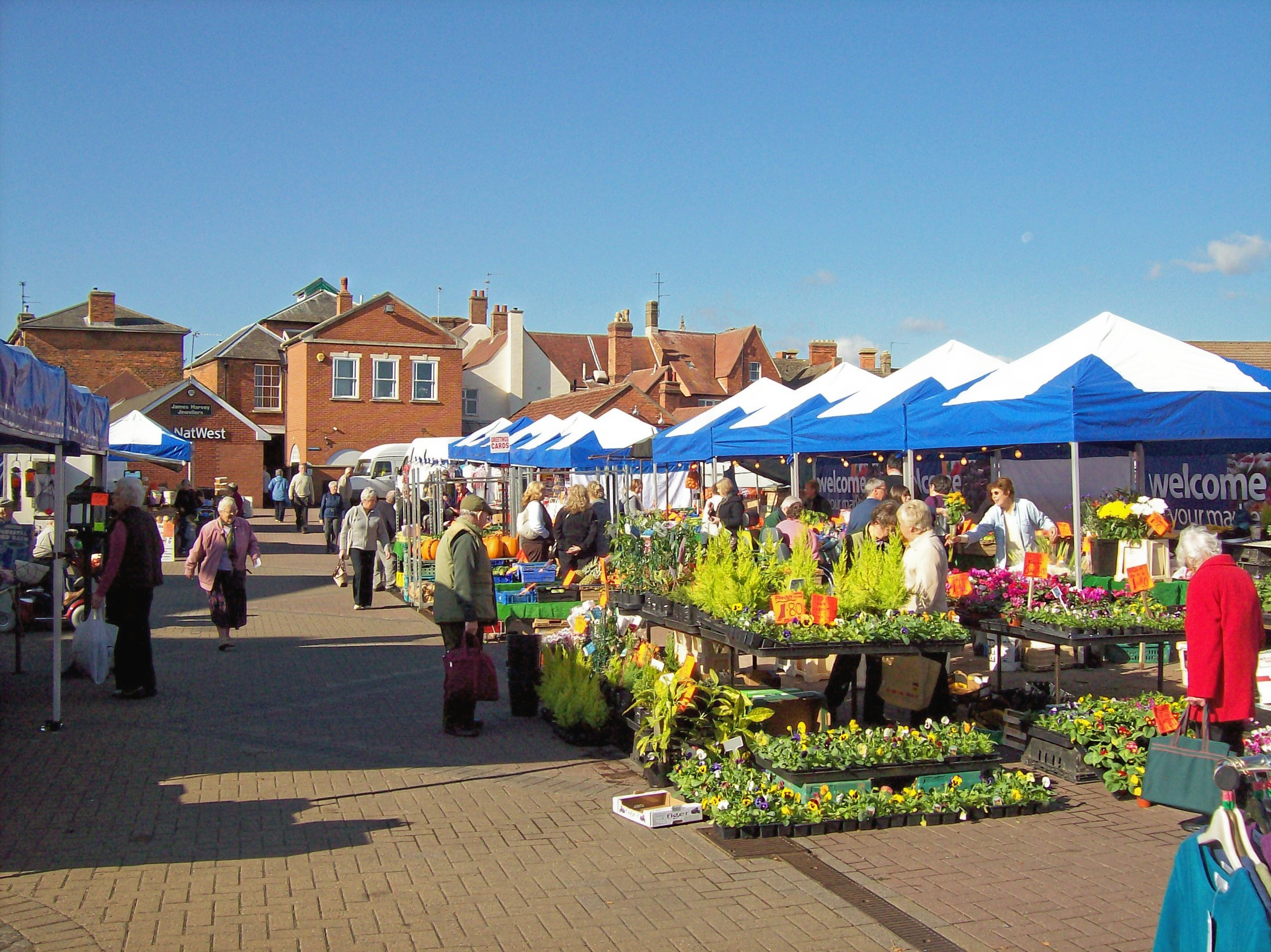
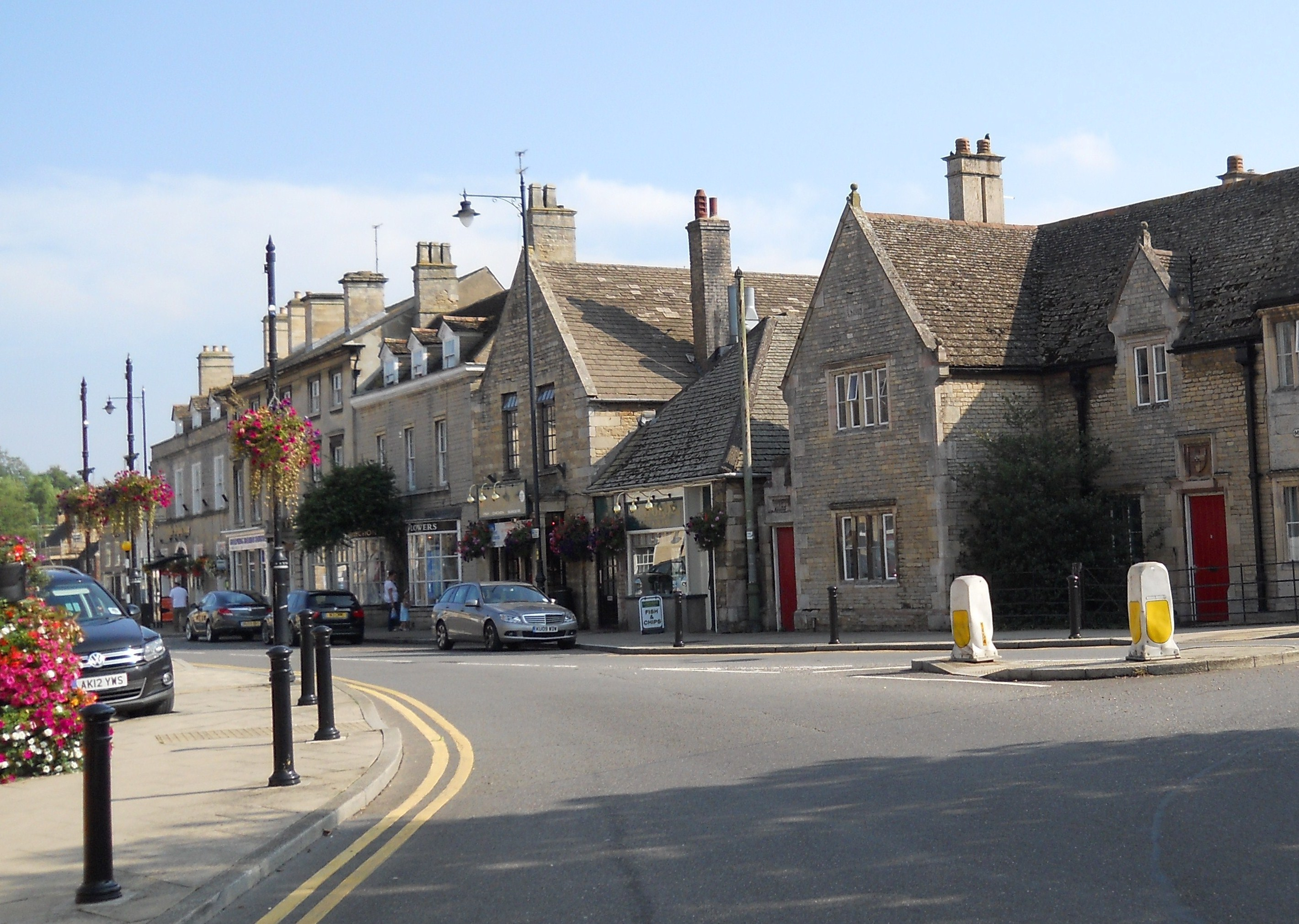
- From left to right; Top: Grantham skyline; Middle: Stamford and Ancaster; Bottom: Bourne market day and Market Deeping town centre

- Shown within the ceremonial county of Lincolnshire
- Sovereign state: United Kingdom
- Constituent country: England
- Region: East Midlands
- Administrative county: Lincolnshire
- Founded: April 1974
- Admin. HQ: Grantham

Government
  - Type: South Kesteven District Council
  - Leadership: Leader and cabinet
  - Executive: Conservative
  - MPs: Gareth Davies, John Hayes, Caroline Johnson

Area
  - Total: 364 sq mi (943 km^{2})
  - Rank: 29th

Population (2024)
  - Total: 147,151
  - Rank: Ranked 156th
  - Density: 404/sq mi (156/km^{2})

Ethnicity (2021)
  - Ethnic groups: List: 95.8% White; 1.8% Asian; 1.4% Mixed; 0.6% Black; 0.4% other

Religion (2021)
  - Religion: List: 58.1% Christianity; 39.8% no religion; 0.5% Islam; 1.6% other
- Time zone: UTC+0 (Greenwich Mean Time)
  - Summer (DST): UTC+1 (British Summer Time)
- ONS code: 32UG (ONS); E07000141 (GSS)
- Ethnicity: 98.4% White

South Kesteven is a local government district in Lincolnshire, England, forming part of the traditional Kesteven division of the county. Its council is based in Grantham. The district also includes the towns of Bourne, Market Deeping and Stamford, along with numerous villages and surrounding rural areas.

South Kesteven borders North Kesteven to the north, South Holland to the east, the City of Peterborough and North Northamptonshire to the south, Rutland to the south-west, the Melton district of Leicestershire to the west, and the Newark and Sherwood district of Nottinghamshire to the north-west.

== History ==
The district was formed on 1 April 1974 under the Local Government Act 1972. It covered the area of five former districts from the administrative county of Kesteven, which were all abolished at the same time:

- Bourne Urban District
- Grantham Municipal Borough
- South Kesteven Rural District
- Stamford Municipal Borough
- West Kesteven Rural District

The new district was named South Kesteven referencing its position within Kesteven, one of the three historic parts of Lincolnshire.

Under current local government reorganisation plans, all district councils in Lincolnshire, as well as the county council, will be abolished in 2028, with the district being combined with others and forming part of a Lincolnshire unitary authority.

== Governance ==
South Kesteven District Council

Type
- Type: Non-metropolitan district

Leadership
- Chair: Anna Kelly, Independent since 21 May 2026
- Leader: Ashley Baxter, Independent since 25 January 2024
- Chief Executive: Karen Bradford since 2020

Structure
- Seats: 56 councillors
- Graph of the party split among 56 seats.
- Political groups: All parties (55) Independent (25) Conservative (18) Reform (5) Liberal Democrats (3) Green (2) Labour (2) Vacancy (1) Vacant (1)

Elections
- Last election: 4 May 2023
- Next election: 6 May 2027

Meeting place
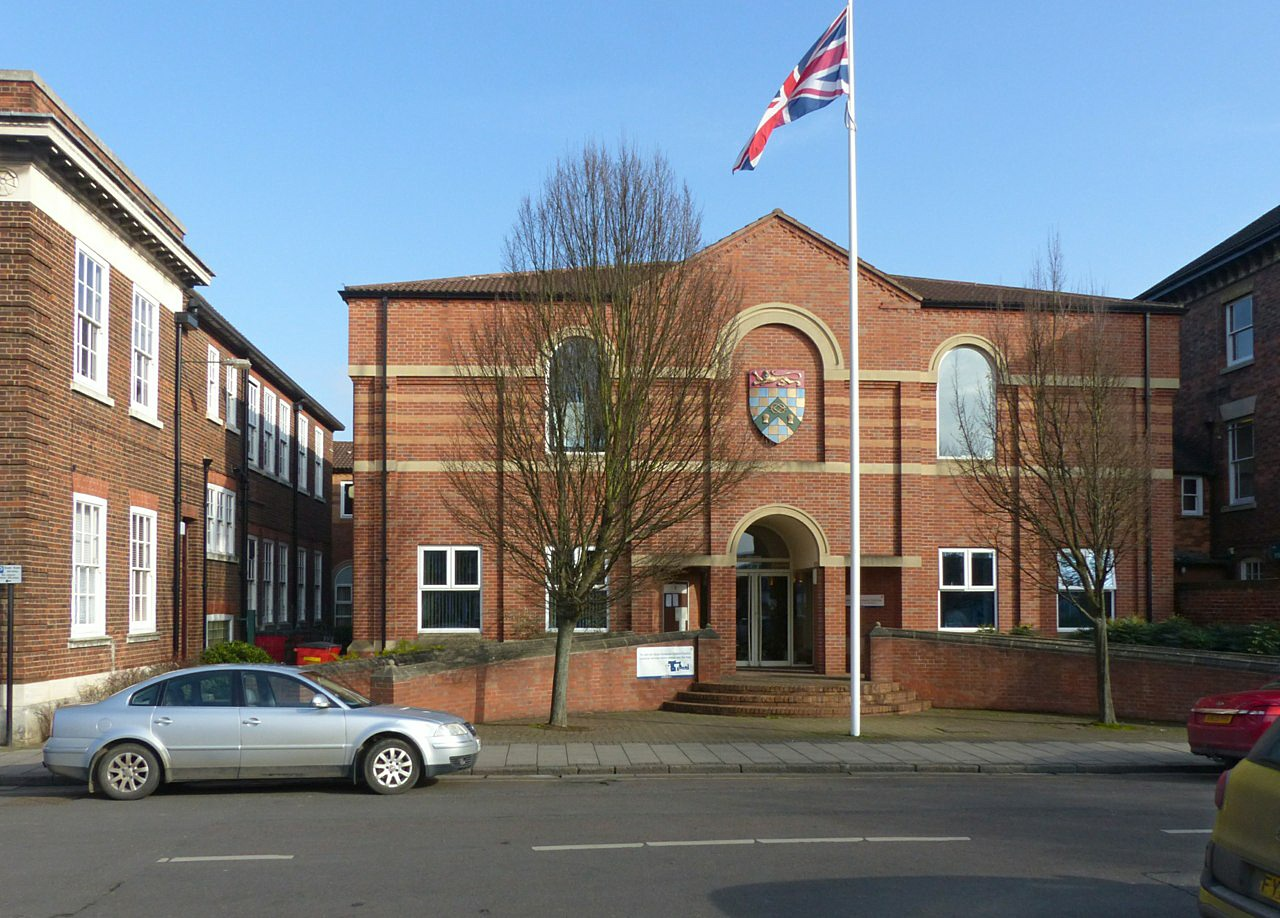
- Council Offices, St Peter's Hill, Grantham, NG31 6PZ

Website
- www.southkesteven.gov.uk

South Kesteven District Council provides district-level services. County-level services are provided by Lincolnshire County Council. All of the district is also covered by civil parishes, which form a third tier of local government.

=== Political control ===
The council has been under no overall control since the 2023 election. Following that election, a coalition of some of the independent councillors with the Greens, Liberal Democrats and Labour formed to run the council. As at September 2026, all the positions on the council's cabinet are held by independent councillors.

The first election to the council was held in 1973, initially operating as a shadow authority alongside the outgoing authorities until the new arrangements came into effect on 1 April 1974. Political control of the council since 1974 has been as follows:

Party in control	Years
No overall control	1974–1979
Conservative	1979–1991
No overall control	1991–2003
Conservative	2003–2023
No overall control	2023–present

=== Leadership ===
The leaders of the council since 2002 have been:

Councillor	Party	From	To
Linda Neal	Conservative	2002	May 2015
Bob Adams	Conservative	21 May 2015	20 Apr 2017
Matthew Lee	Conservative	20 Apr 2017	26 Sep 2019
Kelham Cooke	Conservative	26 Sep 2019	May 2023
Richard Cleaver	Independent	18 May 2023	25 Jan 2024
Ashley Baxter	Independent	25 Jan 2024	

=== Composition ===
Following the 2023 election, and subsequent by-elections and changes of allegiance up to September 2026, the composition of the council was:

Party	Seats
Independent	25
Conservative	18
Reform	5
Liberal Democrats	3
Green	2
Labour	2
Vacant	1
Total	56

Of the 25 independent councillors, eight form the "Democratic Independent Group", six form the "Grantham Independent Group", five form the "Independent Group", three form the "South Kesteven Independent Group", and the other three are not aligned to any group. All seats on the council's cabinet are held by members of the Democratic Independent Group, Grantham Independent Group and the Independent Group. The next election is due in 2027.

=== Elections ===
Since the last boundary changes in 2015 the council has comprised 56 councillors representing 30 wards, with each ward electing one, two or three councillors. Elections are held every four years.

=== Premises ===
The council is based at the Council Offices on St Peter's Hill in Grantham. The building was purpose-built for the council and opened in 1987.

== Geography ==
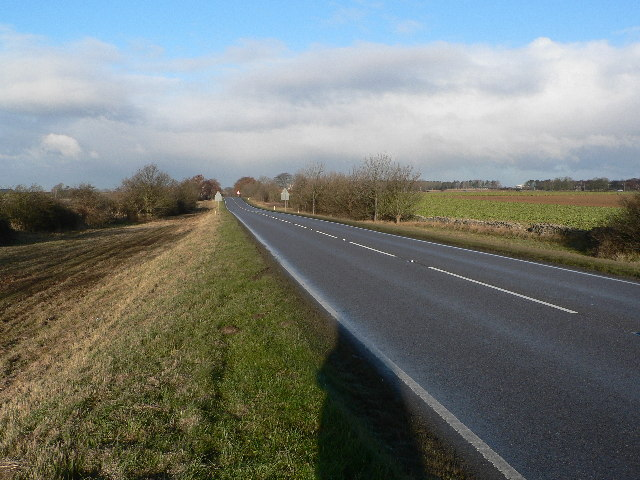
Ermine Street at Byard's Leap

South Kesteven borders North Kesteven to the north, as far east as Horbling, where the A52 crosses the South Forty-Foot Drain. From there south it borders South Holland along the South Forty-Foot Drain, crossing the A151 just west of Guthram Gowt. The border follows the River Glen near to Tongue End where at Baston, the boundary crosses north–south over Baston and Langtoft fens. It crosses the A1175 at the B1525 junction (the end of the Deepings bypass), then meets the Welland about two miles west of Crowland at a point called Kennulph's Stone. The parish of Deeping St. James is the south-east corner of the district, where the district borders the unitary authority of City of Peterborough. The boundary follows the Welland to Stamford, briefly following the B1443 (Barnack Road) where it skirts the edge of Burghley Park.

At the point where the railway crosses under the A1, is the corner of two other districts – Rutland and North Northamptonshire. The boundary with Rutland follows the east side of the A1. Since 1991, none of the A1 bypass is in South Kesteven. The boundary meets that of Great Casterton, and briefly follows the B1081 Ermine Street at Toll Bar. The boundary then follows that of Rutland, crossing the East Coast Main Line at Braceborough and Wilsthorpe and again at Carlby. At Castle Bytham, the boundary follows the east side of the A1, and crosses the A1 at South Witham, where a little further west is a corner with the district of Melton. The boundary follows that of Leicestershire along the former Sewstern Lane, which is now the Viking Way where it crosses the eastern end of Saltby Airfield. The boundary deviates from the Viking Way at Woolsthorpe-by-Belvoir where it briefly follows the River Devon. It crosses the A52 and railway at Sedgebrook. This area is part of the Vale of Belvoir. The boundary then passes through the former RAF Bottesford, where just north it meets the district of Newark and Sherwood (Staunton) at Three Shire Oak. The boundary crosses the A1 at Shire Bridge. It follows Shire Dyke at Claypole, crossing the East Coast Main Line, then briefly follows the River Witham. The north-west corner of the district is on the River Witham at Claypole just south of Barnby in the Willows. Further east, a two-mile section of the A17 skirts the district, just east of Byards Leap.

A corner of the district is where it meets the former route of Ermine Street, and now the Viking Way. This is the point where it meets the corners of Cranwell and Byard's Leap, and Temple Bruer with Temple High Grange in North Kesteven. The boundary follows the Viking Way for three miles south, crossing the A17. It follows the B6403 to just north of Ancaster. It skirts Ancaster then rejoins the B6403 south of Ancaster to a point just south of RAF Barkston Heath. It passes just east of Oasby, crosses the A52, passes east of Braceby and Sapperton and Pickworth, then north of Folkingham. North of Horbling it follows the A52 all the way to Donington High Bridge.

The district's border with Northamptonshire is Britain's smallest border at only 10 metres long. However, the boundary with Rutland was altered in April 1991.

== Towns and parishes ==
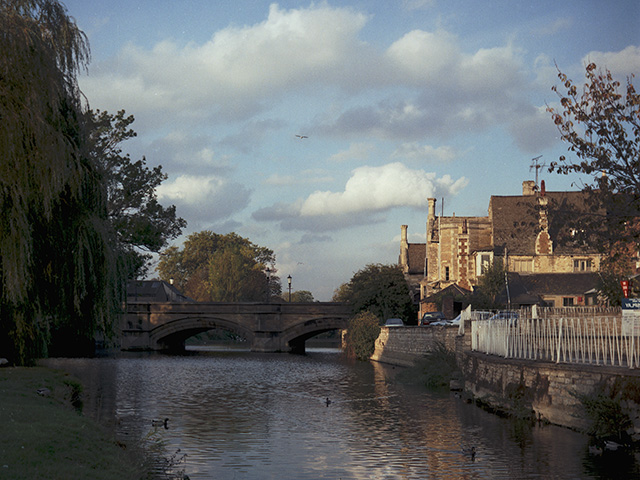
Welland bridge in Stamford

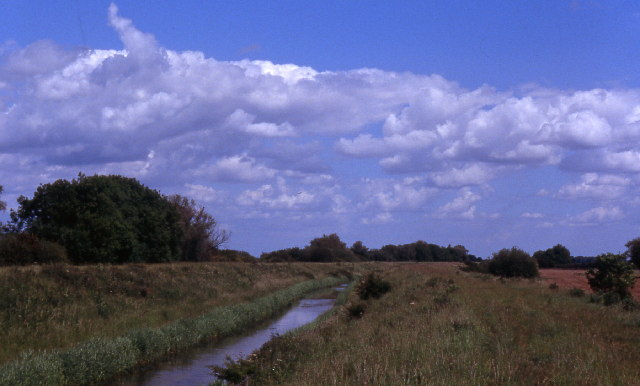
River Glen at Thurlby

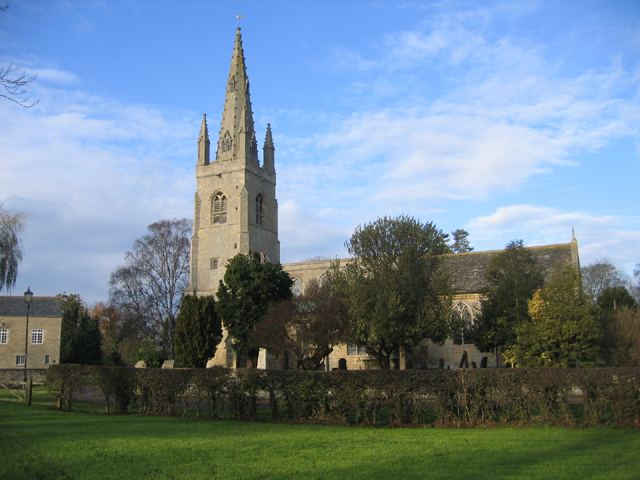
Parish church of West Deeping

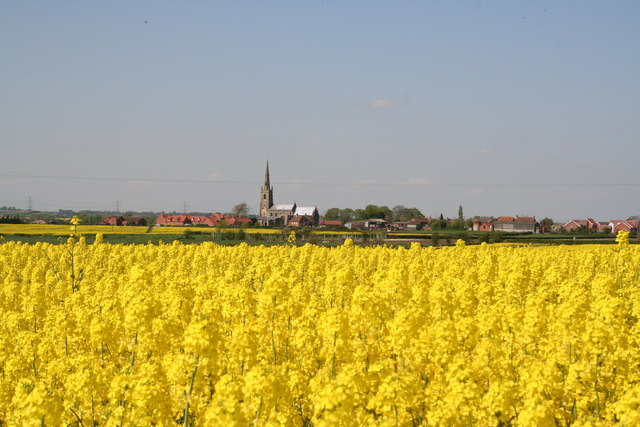
Oil seed rape and Claypole church

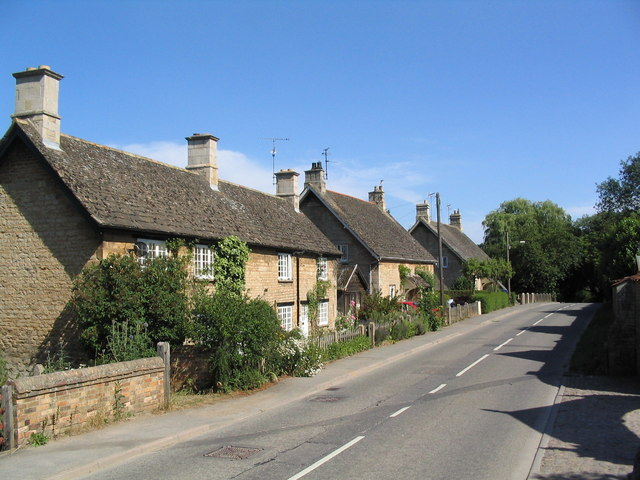
Witham on the Hill

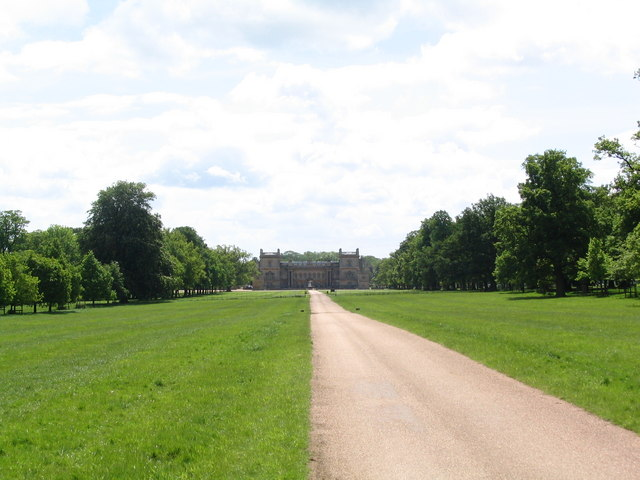
Grimsthorpe Castle - designed by John Vanbrugh, who also designed Blenheim Palace

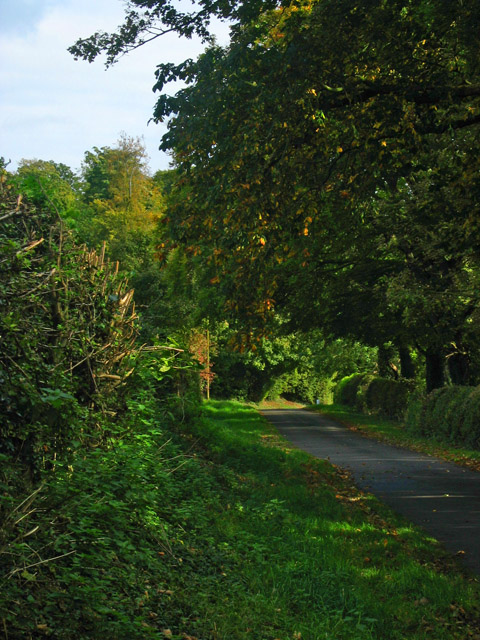
Cringle Road in Stoke Rochford

All of the district is covered by civil parishes, the parish councils for Bourne, Grantham, Market Deeping and Stamford have declared their parishes to be towns, allowing them to take the style "town council". Some of the smaller parishes have a parish meeting rather than a parish council. The parishes are:

- Allington
- Ancaster
- Aslackby and Laughton
- Barholm and Stowe
- Barkston
- Barrowby
- Baston
- Belton and Manthorpe
- Billingborough
- Bitchfield and Bassingthorpe
- Boothby Pagnell
- Bourne
- Braceborough and Wilsthorpe
- Braceby and Sapperton
- Burton Coggles
- Careby Aunby and Holywell
- Carlby
- Carlton Scroop
- Castle Bytham
- Caythorpe
- Claypole
- Colsterworth
- Corby Glen
- Counthorpe and Creeton
- Deeping St James
- Denton
- Dowsby
- Dunsby
- Dyke
- Easton
- Edenham
- Fenton
- Folkingham
- Foston
- Fulbeck
- Grantham
- Great Gonerby
- Great Ponton
- Greatford
- Gunby and Stainby
- Haconby
- Harlaxton
- Heydour
- Honington
- Horbling
- Hough-on-the-Hill
- Hougham
- Ingoldsby
- Irnham
- Kirkby Underwood
- Langtoft
- Lenton, Keisby and Osgodby
- Little Bytham
- Little Ponton and Stroxton
- Londonthorpe and Harrowby Without
- Long Bennington
- Market Deeping
- Marston
- Morton and Hanthorpe
- Normanton
- North Witham
- Old Somerby
- Pickworth
- Pointon
- Pointon and Sempringham
- Rippingale
- Ropsley and Humby
- Sedgebrook
- Skillington
- South Witham
- Stamford
- Stoke Rochford
- Stubton
- Swayfield
- Swinstead
- Syston
- Tallington
- Thurlby
- Twenty
- Toft with Lound and Manthorpe
- Uffington
- Welby
- West Deeping
- Westborough and Dry Doddington
- Witham on the Hill
- Woolsthorpe-by-Belvoir
- Wyville cum Hungerton

== Demographics ==
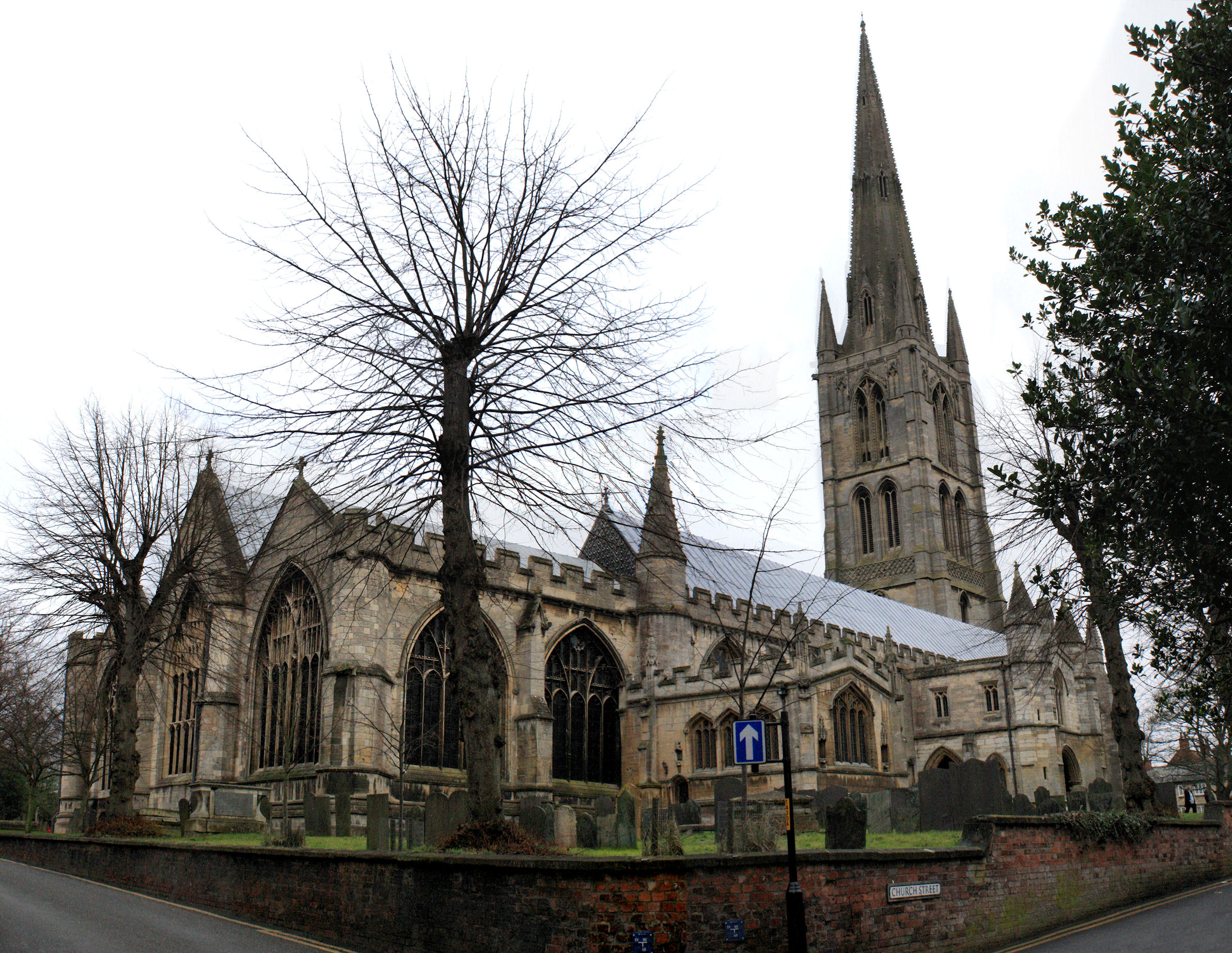
St Wulfram's Church, Grantham, which is notable for having the second tallest spire in Lincolnshire after Louth's parish church

There was a population of 124,745 in the district at the 2001 census; it is the second-largest district in Lincolnshire by population after East Lindsey. However, it has the most people in the county aged under 19 and 25–49. It has the most university-educated people in the county and the healthiest people. It has the most employed people in the county – 61,000. The median age of the district is 39.

The district is the second least deprived in Lincolnshire, after North Kesteven. 60% of the district live in the towns. Fifteen of the villages are classed as "larger villages" in the district's local plan. In the 2001 census, the district had 58,033 dwellings. For Lower Level Super Output Areas (around 1,500 population), there are 18 in the top 10% least deprived in England; around 30,000 people.

== Economy ==
Farming is the main rural industry. The National Transmission System passes north–south through the district just west of Bourne and the A15.

23% of occupations are in hotel and catering; 23% in public administration, education, and health; and 27% in construction and manufacturing. 18% of companies are in knowledge-based industries, fairly high for the nearby region, but lower than Peterborough or Rutland (both 20%); the UK average is 20%. Although the district has a lower job density (jobs per resident) than the UK average, the relatively low local unemployment rate means many residents work outside the district. This also means that unemployed residents would be better looking for employment outside the district.

Stamford has a presence in the publishing sector, specialising in domestic pets and aviation, helped by the proximity of EMAP in Orton, Peterborough. The largest employer in Bourne is the Bourne Prepared Produce site of Bakkavör, who prepare salads, and stir fry vegetables.

The district opened its first purpose-built business innovation centre, called Eventus, on the A1175 at Market Deeping in July 2010. This is to attract high-tech companies, which the district notably lacks (as does most of the county), and was funded by the district and county councils. The district has a stable economy. It lies in the Welland Sub Regional Strategic Partnership (Welland SSP), which covers the district apart from Grantham, and has been run by Welland Enterprise (owned by Norfolk and Waveney Enterprise Services) based at Stoke Rochford. Grantham is covered by Lincolnshire Enterprise. Outside of the main towns, commercial development has been allocated for Colsterworth and the Roseland Business Park at Long Bennington on part of the former RAF Bottesford.

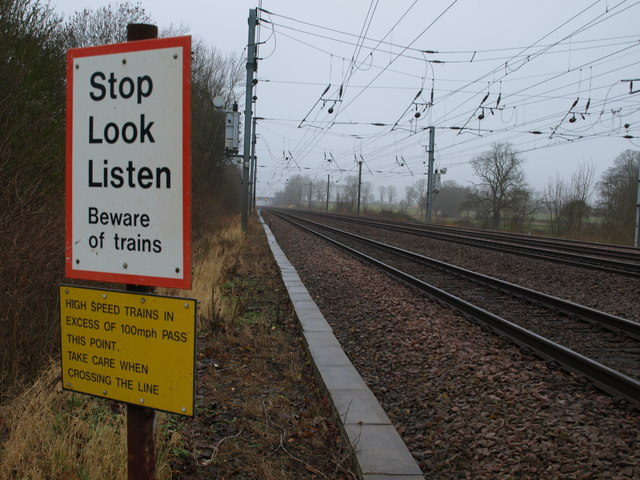
East Coast Main Line near Uffington

The district forms the northern sector of the Peterborough Sub-Region (formed also with Rutland, South Holland, East Northamptonshire, Huntingdonshire and Fenland). Bourne, Stamford and Market Deeping are in Peterborough's travel to work area (TTWA). North of there, Grantham is the next TTWA. The A15 corridor to Bourne is where most people in the district work in Peterborough. At the 2001 census it was found only 65% of workers work in the district, but 13% go to Peterborough, 3% to Rutland and 2% to North Kesteven. Around 21% of people working in the district live elsewhere – 3% from North Kesteven and Peterborough, and 2% from Rutland. Around 700 people in the district travel to work in London.

In 2011, South Kesteven District Council invested £60,000 to transform a patch of wasteland in Greyfriars into a revitalised play area for children. The initiative is now known as the Arnoldsfield Adventure Area.

=== Visitor attractions ===
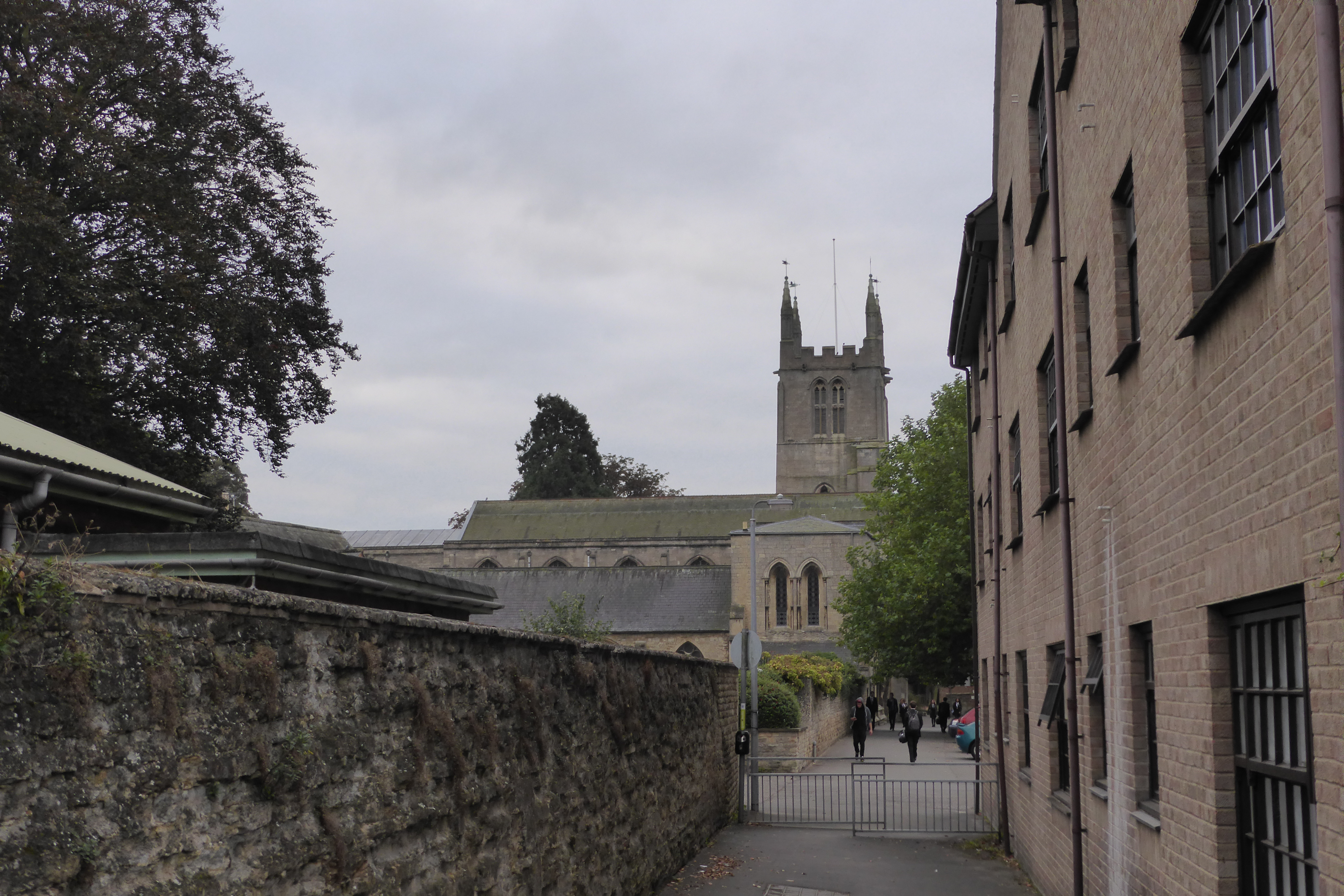
Bourne Abbey in Bourne

The district has a 130-mile walk called the South Kesteven Round. Other attractions can be found in the towns of Bourne (Bourne Abbey, Bourne Castle), Grantham (St Wulfram's Church), Market Deeping, Stamford (Churches, markets etc.) among other places. There are several historical country estates than can be visited, including Belton House and Grimsthorpe Castle.

== Transport ==
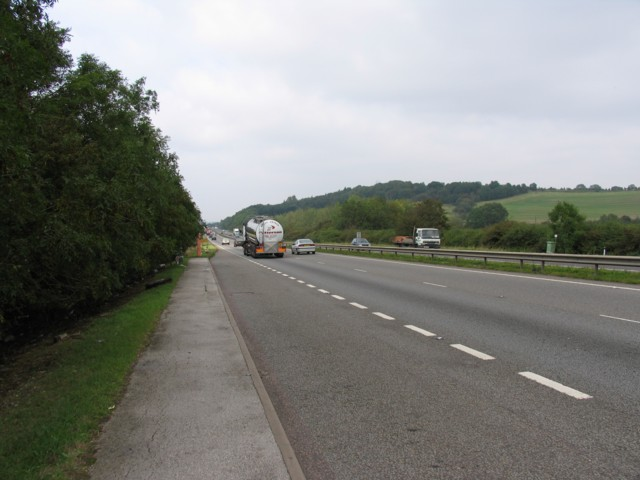
A1 at Barrowby

The A1 passes through the district as does the East Coast Main Line. The A52 is a busy east–west route. The A15 is a quieter route and goes through the centre of many villages.

The Birmingham to Peterborough Line passes through Stamford, which is one of the few east–west routes.

The Skegness to Nottingham line (The Poacher Line) and the East Coast Main Line serve Grantham. This is another east–west route that also carries train services between Norwich and Liverpool.

== Media ==
In terms of television, the area is served by BBC East Midlands and ITV Central broadcast from the Waltham TV transmitter. The Belmont transmitter also covers the area and broadcasts BBC Yorkshire and Lincolnshire and ITV Yorkshire. With the co-channel interference from the Waltham transmitter, a small number of households in the southern tip of the district are able to receive BBC East and ITV Anglia.

Radio stations for the area are:

- BBC Radio Lincolnshire on 104.7 FM and 94.9 FM
- BBC Radio Cambridgeshire can also be received on 95.7 FM,
- Hits Radio Lincolnshire on DAB
- Greatest Hits Radio Lincolnshire on 96.7FM and 102.2 FM
- Greatest Hits Radio Stamford and Rutland (covering Stamford) on 97.4 FM
- Smooth East Midlands on 106.8 FM
- Heart East on 102.7 FM
- Gravity FM (for Grantham) on 97.2 FM

== Education ==
The district has 51 primary schools and 10 state secondary schools. There are 8 independent schools.

=== Training ===
The district had one of two teacher training colleges in the county until 1978 when Kesteven College of Education at Stoke Rochford Hall closed. More recently the district had the Kesteven Agricultural College at Caythorpe Court, in the north of the district. It was taken over by the newly formed University of Lincoln, who closed it one year later in 2002.

Due to neighbouring Rutland not having a further education college, it relies on New College Stamford. Rutland also shares an Employment and Skills Board, Education Business Partnership, Connexions (agency), Aimhigher centre, and learndirect service (Lincolnshire & Rutland Hub based at Lincoln College).

== Arms ==
Coat of arms of South Kesteven
Notes Granted 20 September 1974 by the College of Arms. Escutcheon Checky Or and Azure on a chevron Vert a wake knot between two garbs Or on a chief Gules a lion passant guardant Or.

== 2016 EU Referendum ==
On Thursday 23 June 2016 South Kesteven voted in the UK-wide referendum on the issue of the United Kingdom's membership of the European Union, in the 2016 EU Referendum. Under the provisions of the European Union Referendum Act 2015, voters were asked to decide on the question "Should the United Kingdom remain a member of the European Union or leave the European Union?” by voting for either "Remain a member of the European Union" or "Leave the European Union". The result saw a decisive vote to "Leave the European Union" by 60% of the electorate on a high turnout of 78%. The result went against the views of the local MP Nick Boles who was in favour of a "Remain" vote.

The result was declared at Meres Leisure Centre in Grantham early on Friday 24 June by the "Counting officer" (CO) Beverly Agass.

United Kingdom European Union membership referendum, 2016; South Kesteven
Choice	Votes	%
Leave the European Union	49,424	59.93%
Remain a member of the European Union	33,047	40.07%
Valid votes	82,471	99.94%
Invalid or blank votes	52	0.06%
Total votes	82,523	100.00%
Registered voters and turnout	105,457	78.25%

South Kesteven referendum result (without spoiled ballots):
Leave: 49,424 (59.9%)	Remain: 33,047 (40.1%)
▲

== See also ==
- List of scheduled monuments in South Kesteven
