= St Medardus and St Gildardus Church, Little Bytham =

St Medardus and St Gildardus Church
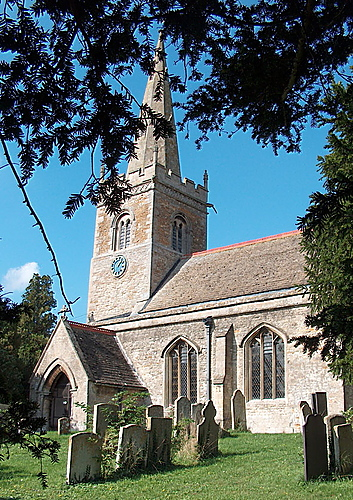
- St Medardus and St Gildardus
- St Medardus and St Gildardus Church
- 52°45′02″N 0°30′03″W
- Denomination: Church of England

History
- Dedication: SS Medard & Gildard

Administration
- Province: Canterbury
- Diocese: Lincoln

The church of St Medardus and St Gildardus in Little Bytham, Lincolnshire, England, is a Grade I listed building. It is dedicated to two 6th-century French saints, St Medard and St Gildard (or Medardus and Gildardus); the dedication is unique in the UK. Virtually unknown in Britain, St Medard is still well known in France, with at least 25 towns or villages named after him (as St Médard or St Méard). Gildard, thought to be his brother, is less well known. The village fête is held annually on or near St Medard's feast day, 8 June.

The earliest parts of the building are some Anglo-Saxon "long-and-short" stonework, visible externally at the southeast and southwest corners (quoins) of the nave. The church also has several Romanesque details dating from the Norman era, including a Priest's Door ("uncommonly ornate", according to Nikolaus Pevsner) with a finely carved tympanum; the empty circular niche in the tympanum is said to have held a relic; the birds in roundels to either side are probably eagles, as one is legendarily supposed to have sheltered Medard from the rain. Also Norman are the plain, undecorated arch into the tower, and the north door (late 12th century).

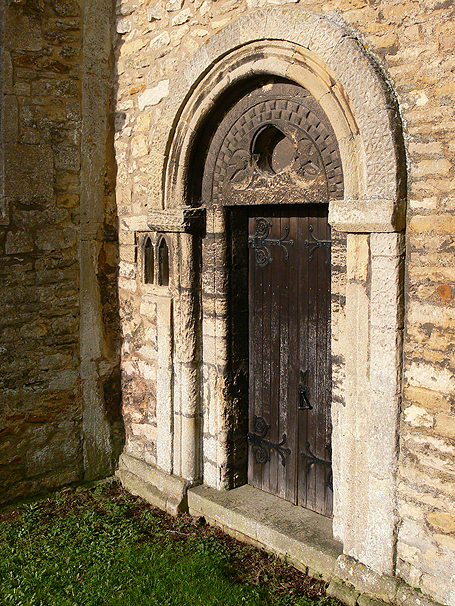
The circular niche above the Priest's Door may once have held a relic of St Medard. Anglo-Saxon long-and-short stonework is visible in the corner to the left.

The south aisle and the upper parts of the tower and spire are 13th century work; the intersecting tracery of the east window of the south aisle shows that it is slightly later, dating from around 1300, as does the nearby piscina. The chancel arch is probably also from the late 13th century, and the double piscina in the chancel may be of a similar age. The Easter Sepulchre in the chancel is in the slightly later (Decorated) style, but is a fairly crude example. A finely sculpted capital depicting a Green Man surrounded by oak leaves, similar to examples at nearby Kirkby Underwood and Greatford, also dates from c.1300. It is no longer in position, having been built into a wall, face inwards, and rediscovered during later restoration work.

The stone base of the pulpit is dated 1590, and has a Latin inscription Orate et parate ("Pray and prepare"). Pevsner mistakenly gives this as Orate et Arate. The Listed Building entry is taken from Pevsner, with the same error.

The churchyard contains the war grave of a Royal Engineers soldier of the First World War.
