= Edenham =

Village and civil parish in the South Kesteven district of Lincolnshire, England

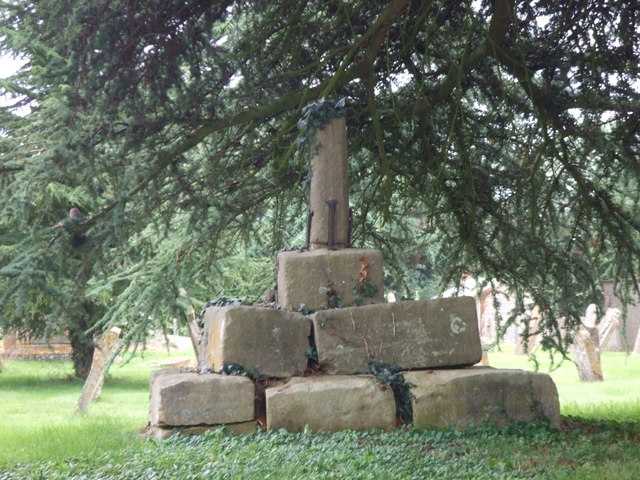
- Remains of an Anglo-Saxon cross in Edenham churchyard, supported by newer blocks

- Location within Lincolnshire
- Population: 291 (2011)
- OS grid reference: TF061218
  - London: 90 mi (140 km) S
- Civil parish: Edenham
- District: South Kesteven
- Shire county: Lincolnshire
- Region: East Midlands
- Country: England
- Sovereign state: United Kingdom
- Post town: BOURNE
- Postcode district: PE10
- Dialling code: 01778
- Police: Lincolnshire
- Fire: Lincolnshire
- Ambulance: East Midlands
- UK Parliament: Rutland and Stamford

Edenham civil parish

Edenham (/ˈɛdənəm/ ED-ən-əm) is a village and civil parish in the South Kesteven district of Lincolnshire, England. It is approximately 3 miles (5 km) north-west of Bourne, and on the A151 road. While the civil parish is called 'Edenham', the parish council is called Edenham, Grimsthorpe, Elsthorpe & Scottlethorpe Parish Council. The population of the civil parish at the 2011 census was 291.

== Geology ==
The parish is principally in the valley of the East Glen which flows through the village.

The broad valley is incised into a gently sloping and much dissected plateau of glacial till which is more graphically described by the older term, boulder clay. The till caps the ridges to either side, the one clothed by the Bourne Woods and the other by the park of Grimsthorpe Castle. All the solid geology is Jurassic. The valley sides are of Kellaways clay, Kellaways sand and Oxford clay while its bottom is of cornbrash and Blisworth clay. In the south and west of the parish are much greater exposures of this solid geology with extensive areas of Blisworth Limestone and the Upper Estuarine Series. In the valley, there are also strips of alluvium and patches of glacial sand and gravel.

Although Grimsthorpe Castle is on higher ground to the west, the village of Grimsthorpe shares the geology of the rest of the parish.

== Constituent settlements in the parish ==
The main village is:

- Edenham 52°47′02″N 0°25′40″W Edenham

The parish includes a number of outlying hamlets:

- Grimsthorpe 52°47′39″N 0°26′46″W
- Scottlethorpe 52°46′33″N 0°26′36″W
- Elsthorpe 52°48′10″N 0°25′50″W

The parish is associated with two lost settlements:

- Elsthorpe, 52°48′29″N 0°26′08″W located near the modern hamlet of that name.
  Aislestorp is mentioned in the Domesday Book of 1086 as belonging to Alfred of Lincoln and having a mill, 5 villagers, all Freemen; 2 ploughlands. 1 lord's plough team, 2 men's plough teams; 18 acres of Meadow, and 240 acres of Woodland. Sunken roads, building plots, and a fishpond have been located at the site of the original settlement.
- Southorpe52°48′40″N 0°27′12″W.
  Sudtorp is mentioned in the Domesday Book as belonging to Guy of Craon and having a mill, 10 villagers, of whom 6 were smallholders; 2 ploughlands. 2 lord's plough teams, 2 men's plough teams; 16 acres of Meadow, and 200 acres of Woodland. The village is mentioned from the time of the Domesday Survey onwards. There was a chantry chapel here in the 12th century. A priest was last instituted at Southorpe in 1521, and, by 1563, only one family remained.

== Administration ==
Once part of the Beltisloe Wapentake in Kesteven, the parish is now part of South Kesteven District. Its obligations under the 19th-century poor law were undertaken by the Bourne Poor Law Union from 1835 onwards.

The present electoral arrangements are as follows:

- South Kesteven District Council, Glen Eden ward, Councillor Maureen Spencer-Gregson OBE
- Lincolnshire County Council, Folkingham Rural ward, Councillor Martin Hill OBE
- Westminster, Stamford and Grantham constituency, Gareth Davies MP

The ecclesiastical parish follows the same boundaries, and is part of the Deanery of Beltisloe, preserving the wapentake boundaries.

== History ==
The Edenham name derives from the Anglo-Saxon ham, meaning 'homestead'. The rest of the name probably derives from dene, a 'vale in woodland' and ea, 'river', though 'Eada's homestead' and 'Eada's hemmed-in-land' have also been suggested. The river East Glen which flows through it is sometimes called the 'Eden' by a process of back-formation from the name of the village.

Edenham appears in the Domesday Book of 1086 as having 32 villagers, 4 smallholders, 24 freemen, 5 lord's plough teams, and 9 men's plough teams, with 400 acres (1.6 km^{2}) of woodland and 29 acres of meadow.

The parish was the site of the Cistercian abbey of Vaudey, founded in 1147 by William le Gros, 1st Earl of Albemarle. It was dissolved during the 1536 Suppression.

Documents of 1307 mention the existence in Edenham of "a hospital".

Since 1516 parish land and villages have been owned by the de Eresby family of Grimsthorpe Castle. This major ancestral seat 2 miles (3.2 km) to the north-west of the village influenced Edenham's estate village character. The de Eresby barony has continued in an unbroken line since 1313, and heads of the family have been Earls and Dukes of Ancaster and the Earl of Lindsey.

The 19th-century Baron Willoughby de Eresby built the Edenham and Little Bytham Railway which connected the village to the East Coast Main Line at Little Bytham. Apart from crossing a road in near Little Bytham station, it ran exclusively on his estate.

The Australian poet and novelist Frederic Manning stayed at the vicarage with the Reverend Arthur Galton after he arrived in the country in 1903. He returned there after the First World War and began writing The Middle Parts of Fortune (republished in an expurgated version under the title Her Privates We).

== Community ==
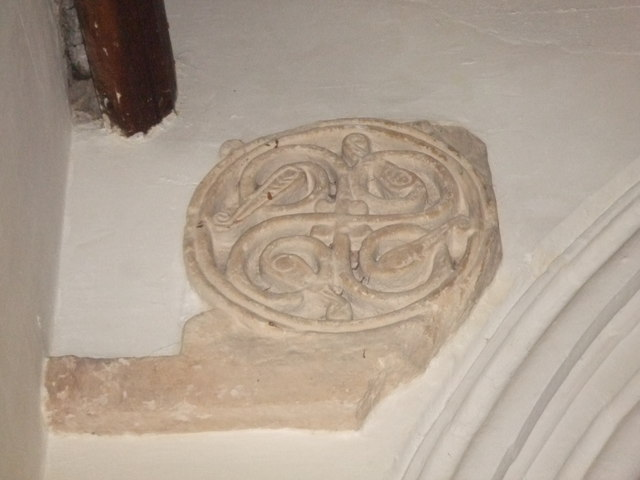
8th-century stone roundel in the south aisle of the church

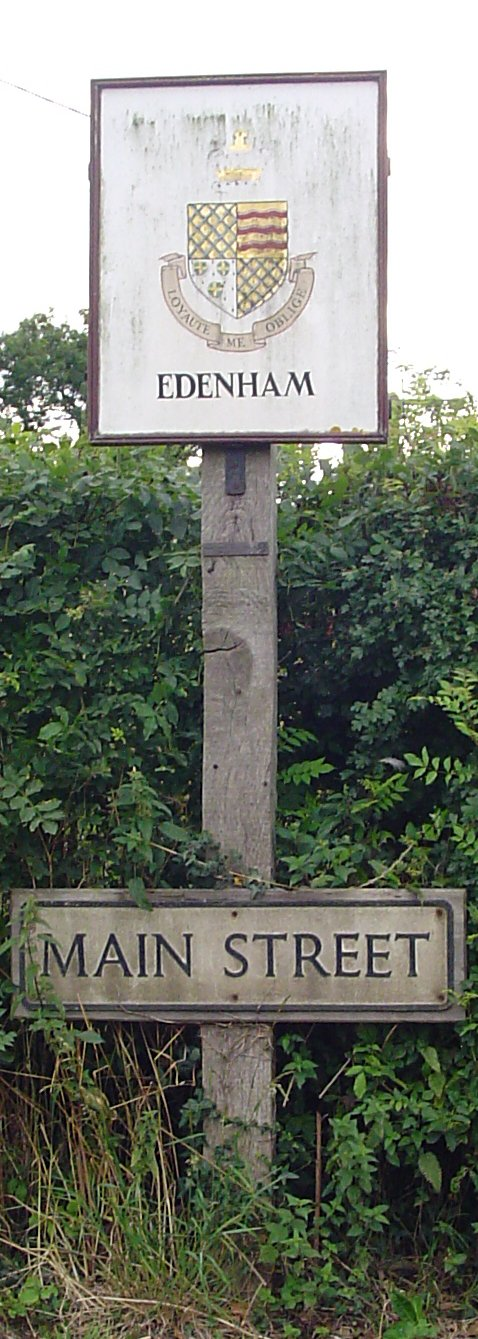
Village sign in Edenham

The Grade I listed Church of England parish church retains some Anglo-Saxon fabric. The Anglo-Saxon church was dedicated to the 'Holy Cross', but the dedication is now to St Michael, or St Michael and all Angels. It has an angel roof, the beams supported on the back of carved and painted angels. As the parish church of the Grimsthorpe estate, it was the burial place of many of the de Eresby family with impressive monuments. Seven family monuments were moved from St Matthew's church in Normanton, Rutland in 1972 when that church was affected by the construction of Rutland Water.

The ecclesiastical parish is Edenham. The church is part of the Edenham with Witham on the Hill Group of the Beltisloe Deanery of the Diocese of Lincoln. The 2013 incumbent is Rev Canon Andrew Hawes.

The vicarage, unlike many vicarages and rectories in rural parishes, has never been sold to a private buyer. It remains the spiritual centre of three parishes and eight small villages, and is run by the Diocese of Lincoln as a retreat house for contemplation and prayer.

A cedar tree overhangs the road from the churchyard, and nearby are the remains of an Anglo-Saxon cross, a Grade II listed building and Scheduled Monument.

The village Church of England primary school, also a Grade II listed building, has a roll of just over one hundred pupils.

== Businesses ==
Apart from agricultural employers, businesses in the village include The Five Bells public house, an agricultural dealer and the local school. The coal merchant and post office have closed.
