= Saxby railway station =

Former railway station in Leicestershire, England

Coordinates: 52.7650°N 0.7954°W

Saxby
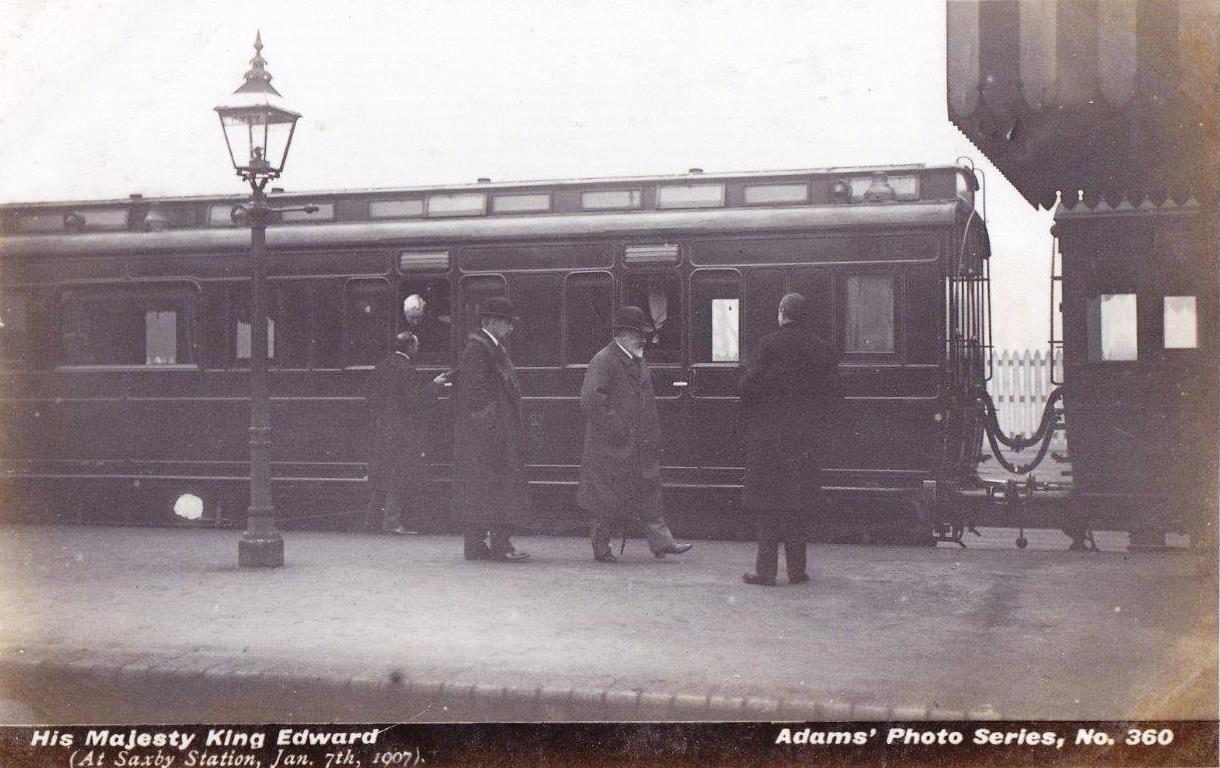
- Edward VII at the station in 1907.

General information
- Location: Saxby, Leicestershire; England
- Grid reference: SK813193
- Platforms: 4

Other information
- Status: Disused

History
- Original company: Midland Counties Railway
- Pre-grouping: Midland Railway
- Post-grouping: London, Midland and Scottish Railway; London Midland Region of British Railways

Key dates
- 1 February 1849: Opened
- 28 August 1892: Resited
- 1 May 1894: M&GNR line opened
- 2 March 1959: M&GNR line closed
- 6 February 1961: Closed
Location

Saxby railway station was a station serving the villages of Saxby and Freeby, Leicestershire. It was located between the two villages.

== Access ==
The older station was accessed along a turning from the B676 road, now known as Old Station Drive, whereas the newer station building was accessed off the Saxby to Stapleford road on the right before the railway bridge. Inter platform access on the newer station was via three sets of stairs to the road bridge.

== History ==
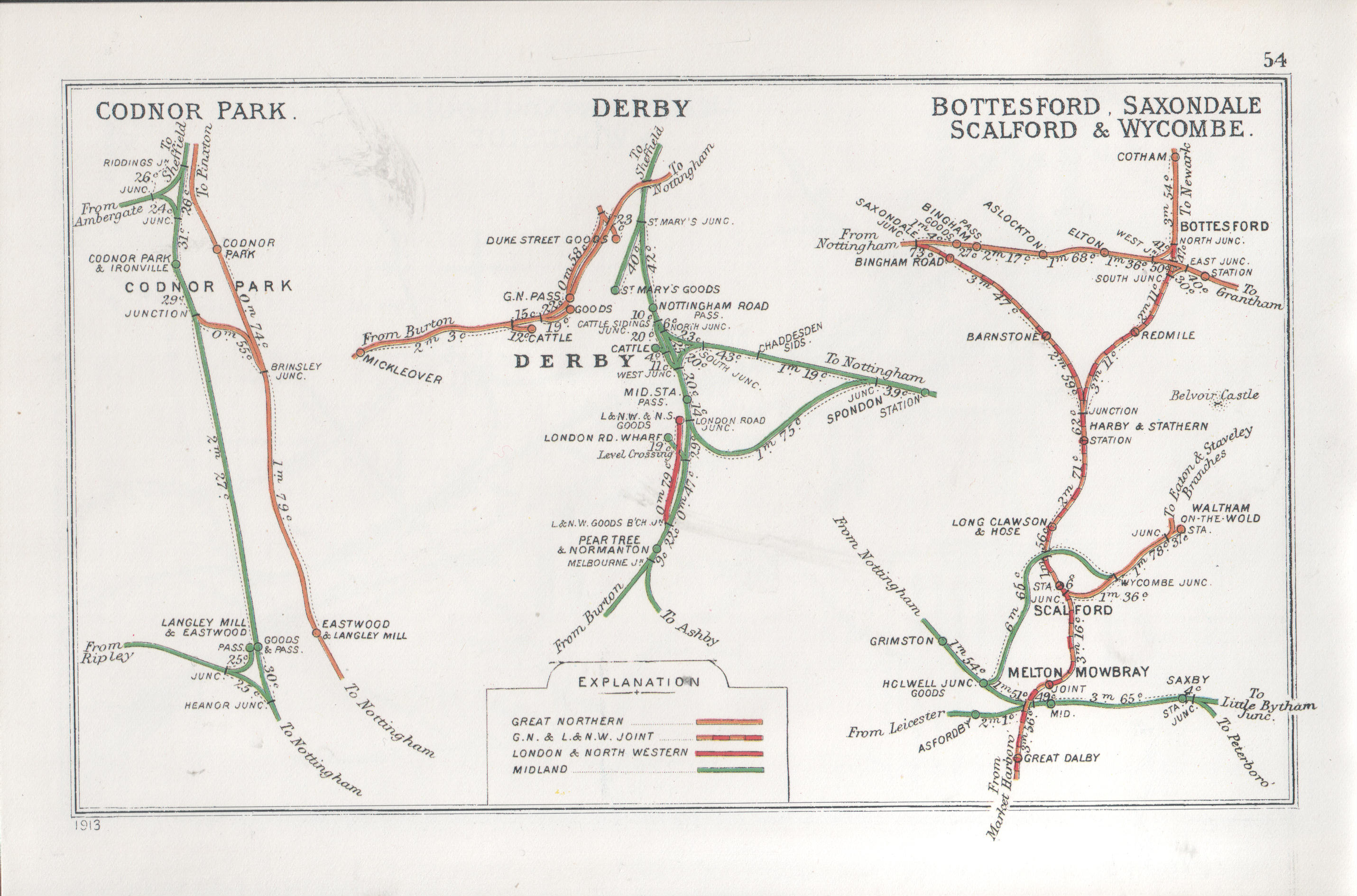
A 1913 Railway Clearing House map of railways in the vicinity of Saxby (right)

The Syston and Peterborough Railway was opened in stages; the third and last section of line, between Melton Mowbray and Stamford opened for goods traffic on 20 March 1848, and for passengers on 1 May 1848. The station at Saxby opened on 1 February 1849, and was at the north end of a tight curve around a corner of Stapleford Park. The curve was considered unsuitable for express trains running between Kettering and Nottingham via the Manton loop, so an easier curve was built in 1892 together with a new Saxby station, which opened on 28 August 1892. The original station on a stub of the original line continued in use for goods.

Saxby became a junction when the Midland and Great Northern Joint Railway (M&GN) opened on 1 May 1894. The new line was Midland Railway property as far as Little Bytham junction, between Castle Bytham and Bourne.

The M&GN line closed to passengers after the last train on 28 February 1959, although the section between Saxby and South Witham remained open for goods trains.

The station closed on 6 February 1961. The last parts of the new station were completely demolished in late 2014, whereas the old station remains as a private house.

== Routes ==
Preceding station	Historical railways	Following station
Melton Mowbray; Line and station open	Midland Railway; Leicester to Peterborough; Nottingham to Kettering	Whissendine; Line open, station closed
	Disused railways	
Terminus	Midland and Great Northern Joint Railway to Spalding, Kings Lynn, etc.	Edmondthorpe and Wymondham; Line and station closed
