= Grimsthorpe =

Hamlet in the South Kesteven district of Lincolnshire, England

Coordinates: 52.79404°N 0.44606°W

- Location within Lincolnshire
- OS grid reference: TF048229
  - London: 90 mi (140 km) S
- Civil parish: Edenham
- District: South Kesteven
- Shire county: Lincolnshire
- Region: East Midlands
- Country: England
- Sovereign state: United Kingdom
- Post town: BOURNE
- Postcode district: PE10
- Dialling code: 01778
- Police: Lincolnshire
- Fire: Lincolnshire
- Ambulance: East Midlands
- UK Parliament: Rutland and Stamford

Grimsthorpe is a hamlet in the South Kesteven district of Lincolnshire, England. It is situated on the A151 road, and 3 miles (5 km) north-west from Bourne. Grimsthorpe falls within the civil parish of Edenham, which is governed by Edenham Grimsthorpe Elsthorpe & Scottlethorpe Parish Council.

Grimsthorpe Castle is 500 yards (460 m) to the west.

John Marius Wilson's 1870 Imperial Gazetteer of England and Wales described Grimsthorpe as:

a hamlet in Edenham parish, Lincoln; on the river Glen, 1½ mile W of Edenham village. Pop., 135. Grimsthorpe Park was the seat once of the Duke of Ancaster, afterwards of Lord Gwyder; is now the seat of Lord Willoughby d'Eresby; was built partly in the time of Henry III., but principally by the Duke of Suffolk, to entertain Henry VIII.; is a large, irregular, but magnificent structure; and stands in an ornate park, about 16 miles in circuit. A Cistertian abbey, founded about 1451, by the Earl of Albemarle, and called Vallis Dei, or, vulgarly, Vaudy, formerly stood in the park, about a mile from the castle.

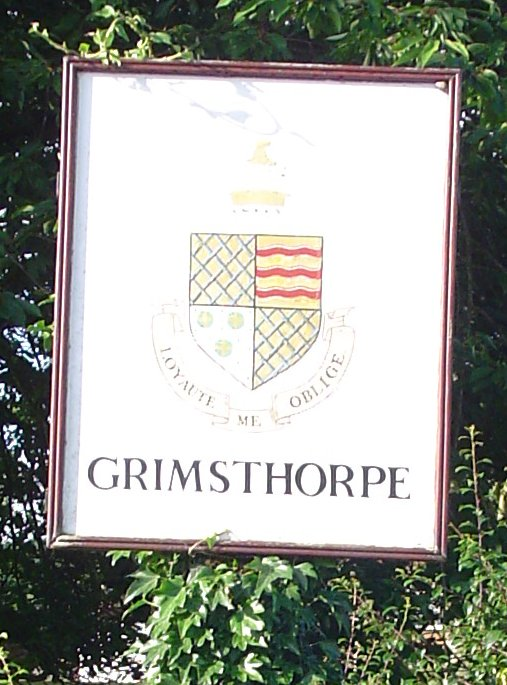
Grimsthorpe signpost

Vaudey Abbey was a Cistercian abbey founded in 1147, dissolved in 1536. The Abbey and its commercial quarries became part of Grimsthorpe Park. The park itself is mentioned in the Domesday Book.

The majority of employment in the village is in agriculture, at Grimsthorpe Castle, or at the Black Horse public house.
