= Edenham and Little Bytham Railway =

UK railway line

The Edenham and Little Bytham Railway was a railway company formed by Lord Willoughby de Eresby to build a line from the Great Northern Railway at Little Bytham to Edenham, serving the villages of Edenham and Grimsthorpe and also Grimsthorpe Castle in Lincolnshire, England.

== History ==
The railway was originally constructed as a road, at the personal expense of Peter, Lord Willoughby de Eresby, between 1851 and 1853. In 1854 and 1855 an early traction engine, "Ophir", built at Swindon Railway Works and possibly designed by Daniel Gooch, hauled wagons on this road.

Adhesion problems and steep gradients of 1 in 30 and 1 in 27 led to an experimental conversion of short stretches to a wooden tramway, and it was decided in March 1855 to convert the entire line to a standard-gauge railway. Ophir was returned to Swindon to be rebuilt with flanged wheels, returning in November 1855, and the railway completed by the summer of 1856.

The road and its conversion were described in "A Letter on Branch Railways Addressed to the Right Honourable, Lord Stanley of Alderley", in a section concerning the use of private roads as alternatives to railways:

"The last attempt of the kind, and not the least interesting, is that which has recently been made by Lord Willoughby d'Eresby, on a private road four miles in length, leading from the village of Edenham in Lincolnshire to the Little Bytham Station, on the Great Northern Railway. In this case a solid roadway was formed of two parallel lines of contiguous wooden blocks laid level with the surface of the road, on which it was attempted to work a very perfect small 8-inch cylindered locomotive with flat wheels, built at the Swindon works. The experiment, which was in every respect well carried out^ and is worthy of record, removed the last existing doubt upon the subject; it was ultimately found necessary to place iron rails upon this solid block-road, and the Edenham Tramway, liberally designed for the benefit of the tenants of the Grimsthorpe estate, is now converted into a Railway of the usual gauge, and worked by a locomotive and carriages with flanged wheels."

The railway was carrying coal over part of its length by the end of 1855, and was open for goods to Edenham by July 1856. During the rebuilding, the decision was made to instigate a full passenger service, and a second locomotive, 0-4-0 wing tank "Havilah" (R & W Hawthorn works no. 957 of 1857) was acquired. A third locomotive of the same design, "Columbia", (works no 1047) was bought in 1858.

The standard of construction left something to be desired, and as a result the line failed its first two Board of Trade inspections. It passed its third inspection after the track was relaid with heavier rails and signals installed, but severe speed restrictions were imposed, as low as 8 miles per hour (13 km/h) in some places.

The E&LBR worked the line themselves as the GNR refused to operate it. The line opened to passengers on 8 December 1857 and was originally worked by the steam locomotives. Passenger carriages were supplied by the GNR and built at Doncaster Works. The line struggled, with passengers services being particularly unprofitable. Much coal traffic had been lost with the opening of a railway direct to Bourne in 1860. Peter Lord Willoughby died in 1865, and left his estate, including the railway, to be controlled by trustees, apparently considering his son Albyric incompetent. This left the line without adequate direction.

Ophir had been sold in 1862, and was bought by Isaac Watt Boulton in March 1866 from Grays Chalk Quarries in Essex, in a lot of three locomotives, for a total of £488. She was converted to a conventional 0-4-0ST and remained in industrial service beyond 1867.

In 1863 the passenger service comprised five trains each way Mondays to Saturdays, taking about 17 minutes to cover the 4 miles, and no service on Sundays. Passenger services ceased on 17 October 1871, because the locomotives were worn out and the company could not afford to replace them. A freight service of sorts lingered on using horse traction until 1872 and possibly as late as 1884, when the line closed.

In 1889, the Eastern & Midland Railway (later part of the Midland and Great Northern Joint Railway) were surveying a route between Little Bytham and Bourne and considered building from Bourne to near Edenham and reopening part of the E&LBR, as this would avoid the expense of Toft tunnel, but rejected it in favour of the more direct route.

In 1890 there was a sale of the railway metal.

A history of the line was recently published by the castle.

== Remains and access ==
The Little Bytham to Witham on the Hill road crossed the line by means of a road overbridge which still exists at grid reference TF025176. The Little Bytham to Edenham public footpath runs next to the trackbed from TF039195 to TF041196. Another public footpath leaves the Little Bytham to Witham road at TF024176 and runs along the trackbed as it approaches Little Bytham station. The path then turns north and rejoins the same road at TF019177. The public footpath from Edenham to Swinstead leaves the A151 road at Edenham at TF060220 and immediately passes through the site of Edenham station, now Copy Lawn Farm, where a weighbridge cabin survives, listed at Grade II.
