= Saint-Médard =

Saint-Médard, commemorating Saint Medardus, may refer to:

== France ==
- Saint-Médard, Charente
- Saint-Médard, Charente-Maritime
- Saint-Médard, Haute-Garonne
- Saint-Médard, Gers
- Saint-Médard, Indre
- Saint-Médard, Lot
- Saint-Médard, Moselle
- Saint-Medard, Paris, a Roman Catholic church
- Saint-Médard, Pyrénées-Atlantiques
- Saint-Médard, Deux-Sèvres
- Saint-Médard-d'Aunis
- Saint-Médard-de-Guizières
  - Saint-Médard-de-Guizières station
- Saint-Médard-de-Mussidan
- Saint-Médard-de-Presque
- Saint-Médard-d'Excideuil
- Saint-Médard-d'Eyrans
  - Saint-Médard-d'Eyrans station
- Saint-Médard-en-Forez
- Saint-Médard-en-Jalles
- Saint-Médard-la-Rochette
- Saint-Médard-Nicourby
- Saint-Médard-sur-Ille
- Abbey of St. Medard, Soissons

== Other countries ==
- Saint-Médard, Herbeumont, Wallonia, Belgium
- Saint-Médard, Quebec, Canada
- Saint Medard, Ouest, Haiti
