= Edmondthorpe and Wymondham railway station =

Former railway station in Leicestershire, England

Coordinates: 52.7622°N 0.7395°W

Edmondthorpe & Wymondham
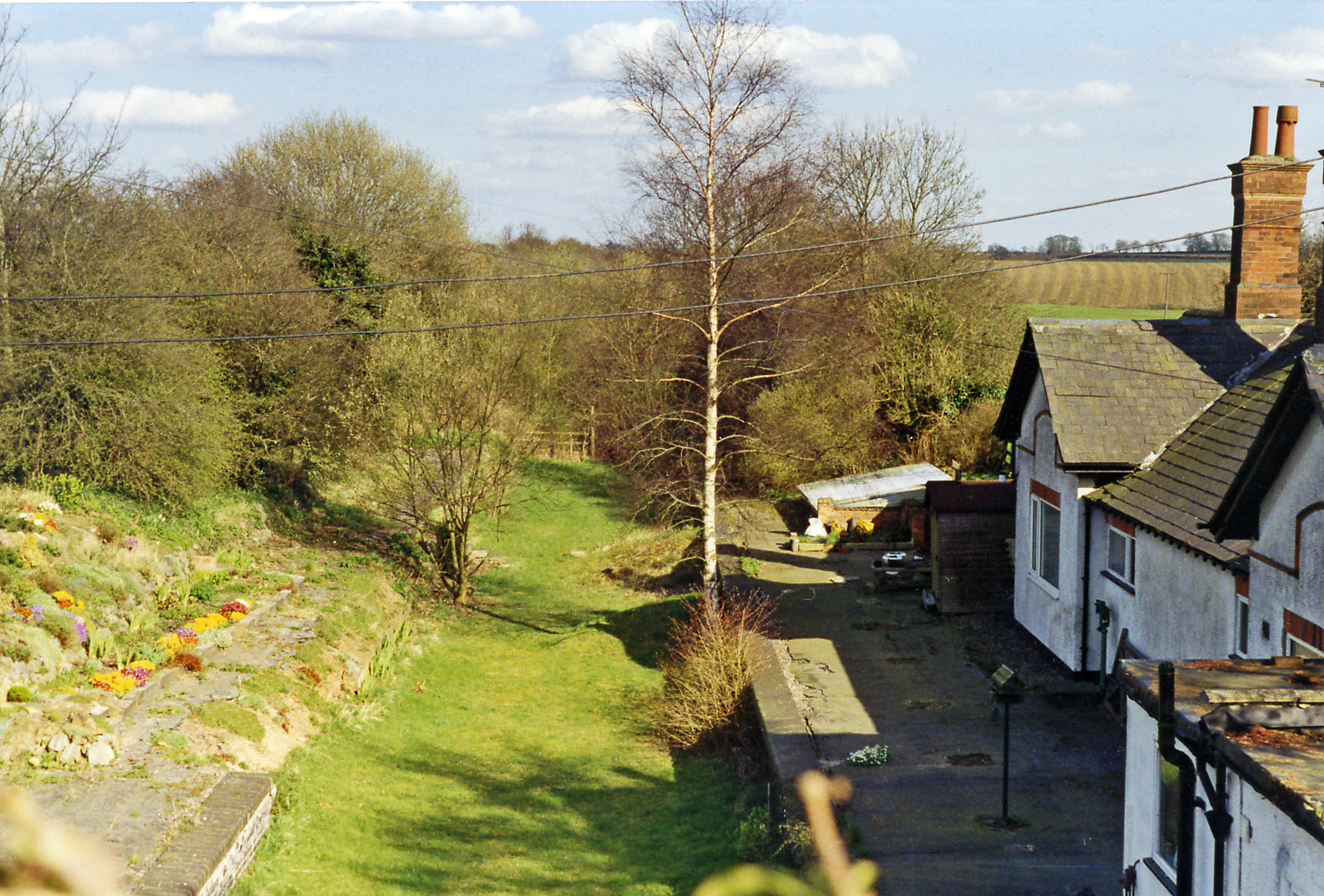
- The station building in 1994

General information
- Location: Wymondham, Leicestershire; England
- Grid reference: SK849190
- Platforms: 2

Other information
- Status: Disused

History
- Pre-grouping: Midland Railway

Key dates
- 1 May 1894: Opened
- 2 March 1959: Closed
Location

Edmondthorpe and Wymondham railway station was a station in Wymondham, Leicestershire. It also served the small hamlet of Edmondthorpe. It was Midland Railway property but train services were operated by the Midland and Great Northern Joint Railway. It was closed in 1959 along with most of the M&GN. Nearby Whissendine railway station on the Leicester to Peterborough line was originally named Wymondham, but had been renamed by 1863.

Former Services

| Preceding station | Disused railways | Following station |
|---|---|---|
| Saxby | Midland and Great Northern Joint Railway | South Witham |
