= Scottlethorpe =

Village in the South Kesteven district of Lincolnshire, England

Coordinates: 52.7800°N 0.4260°W

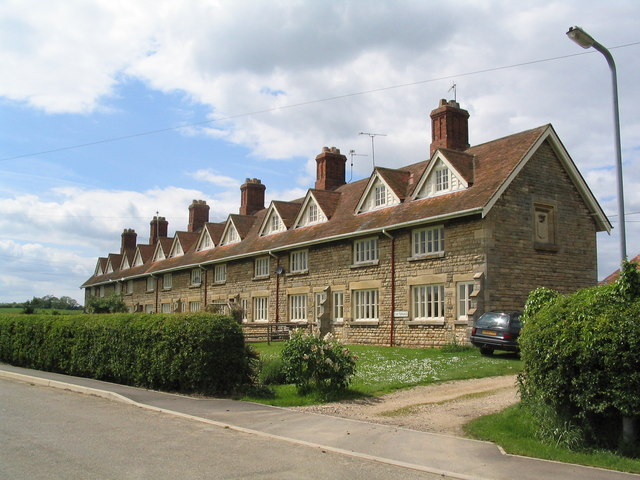
- Stone-built estate cottages

- Location within Lincolnshire
- OS grid reference: TF062214
  - London: 90 mi (140 km) S
- Civil parish: Edenham
- District: South Kesteven
- Shire county: Lincolnshire
- Region: East Midlands
- Country: England
- Sovereign state: United Kingdom
- Post town: Bourne
- Postcode district: PE10
- Police: Lincolnshire
- Fire: Lincolnshire
- Ambulance: East Midlands
- UK Parliament: Gainsborough

Scottlethorpe is a village in the South Kesteven district of Lincolnshire, England. It is situated approximately 3 miles (4.8 km) north-west from Bourne, and on the A151 road. The village is within the civil parish of Edenham; the local area is part of the Grimsthorpe Castle estate.

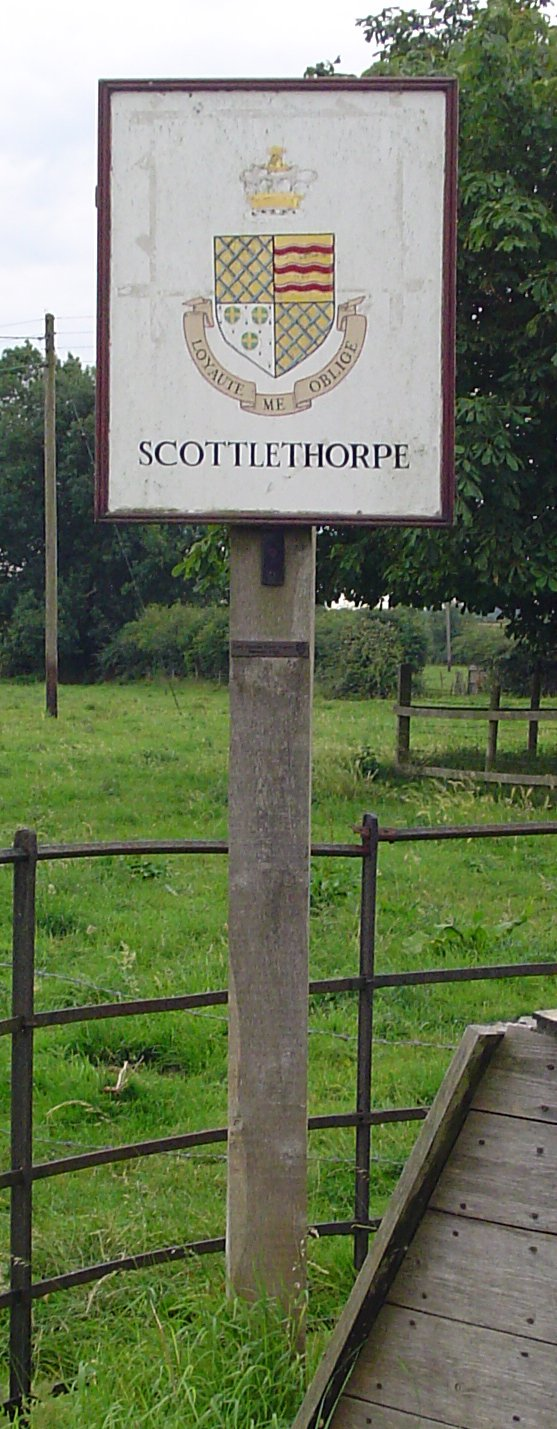
Signpost in Scottlethorpe

The modern settlement is a series of cottages and a small terrace of houses extending along Scottlethorpe Lane between the modern village of Edenham and the site of the medieval chapel.

Scottlethorpe is mentioned in the Domesday Book as "Scachertorp" within the Beltisloe wapentake, and consisting of 3 households and 1.3 ploughlands. In 1086 the Lord of the manor and Tenant-in-chief became Robert of Tosny.

There were medieval chapels in the area, one at Scottlethorpe, and others wider afield. The remains of the 12th-century chapel at Scottlethorpe survived as part of a barn at Manor Farm. However, the barn doorway might have come not from the chapel, but from Vaudey Abbey, The doorway was moved into Edenham church in 1967.
