= Medardus =

French bishop

Saint Medardus
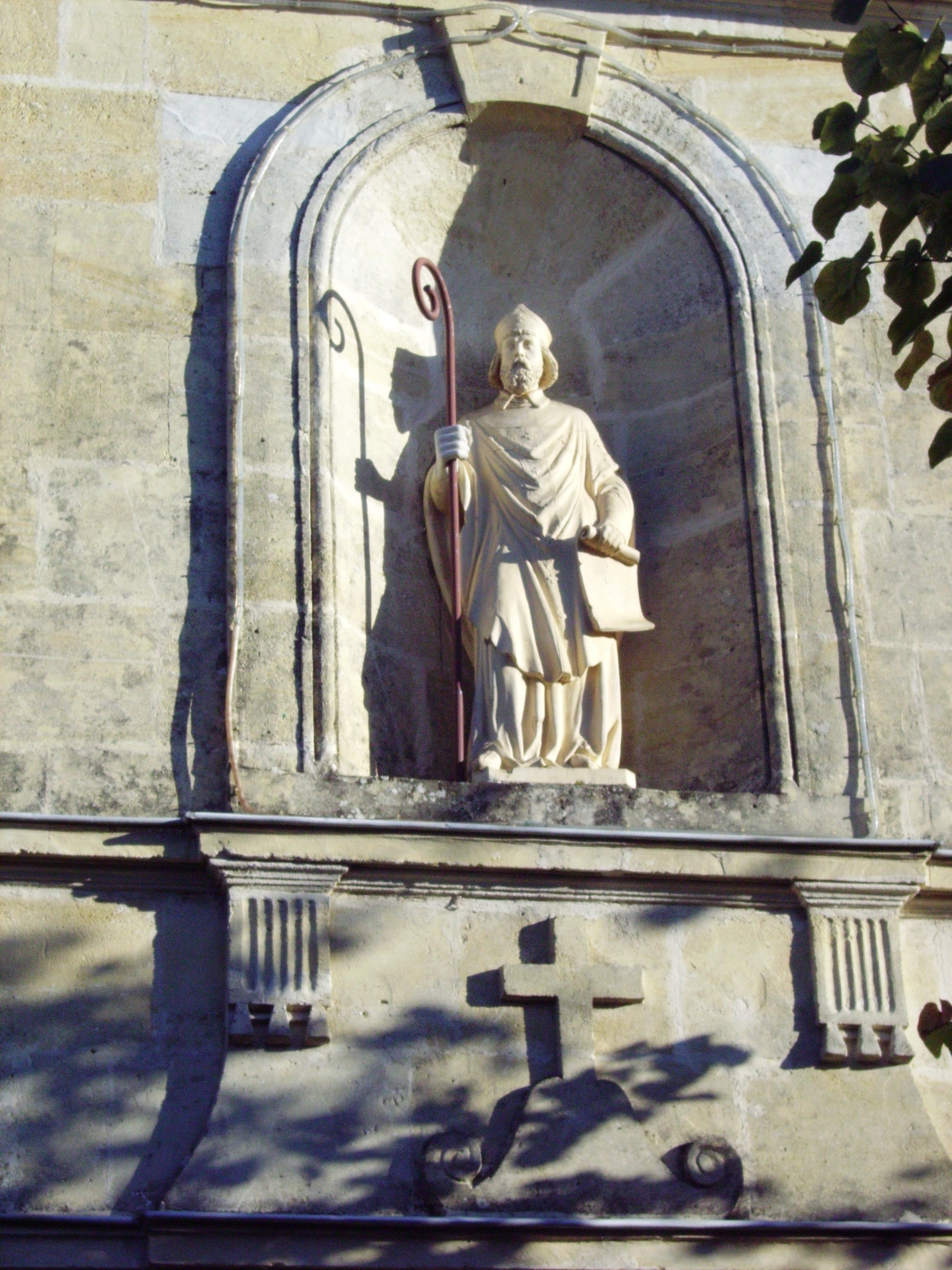
- Statue of Saint Medardus, Saint Médard d'Eyrans

Bishop and Confessor
- Born: 456; Salency, Oise, Picardy, France
- Died: June 8, 545; Noyon, Oise, Picardy, France
- Venerated in: Roman Catholic Church; Eastern Orthodox Church
- Major shrine: Abbey of Saint-Médard, Soissons, France
- Feast: June 8
- Attributes: Episcopal garments
- Patronage: the weather; invoked against toothache

Medardus or Medard (French: Médard or Méard) (ca. 456–545) was the Bishop of Noyon. He moved the seat of the diocese from Vermand to Noviomagus Veromanduorum (modern Noyon) in northern France. Medardus was one of the most honored bishops of his time, often depicted laughing, with his mouth wide open, and therefore he was invoked against toothache.

== Life ==
Medardus was born around 456 at Salency, Oise, in Picardy. His father, Nectaridus, was a noble of Frankish origin, while his mother Protagia was Gallo-Roman. The Roman Martyrology includes the fanciful tale that Gildard, Bishop of Rouen, was his brother, '"born on the same day, consecrated bishops on the same day, and on the same day withdrawn from this life." However, there is no mention of Gildard in the earliest lives of Medardus, and Gildard attended the First Council of Orléans in 511, while Medardus was not consecrated until 530.

A pious fiction links his childhood to his future bishoprics: "He often accompanied his father on business to Vermand and Tornacum (modern Tournai), where he frequented the schools, carefully avoiding all worldly dissipation".

Medardus lived during the immediate aftermath of the fall of the Western Roman Empire. The last Western Roman emperor was deposed in 476. During 481–511, the Salian Frankish king Clovis I conquered and united several Germanic successor states to form the Kingdom of Francia, the predecessor of modern France and Germany.

St. Medardus was ordained at the age of 33. His piety and knowledge, considerable for that time, caused Bishop Alomer of Vermand to confer on him Holy Orders. At the death of Alomer in 530, Medardus was chosen to succeed him as bishop of Vermand. Despite his objections, but the people insisted, so he accepted the responsibilities.

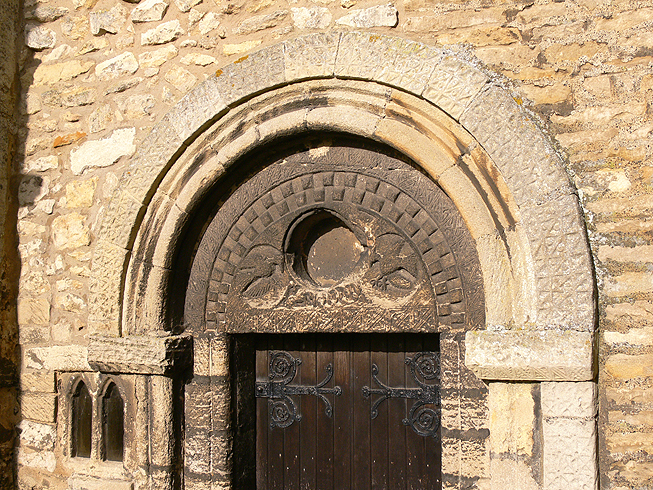
Romanesque tympanum at church of St Medard & St Gildard, Little Bytham, UK (the dedication is unique in Britain). The circular opening may once have held a relic of the saint. The birds on either side are probably eagles; one is said to have sheltered Medardus from a rainstorm

is held to have removed the seat of his bishopric from Vermand, a little city with no defences, to Noviomagus Veromanduorum (modern Noyon), the strongest place in that region of Neustria, in 531.[2]  That year Clotaire marched against the Thuringii with his brother Theuderic I, but struggles with the Burgundians also troubled Merovingian Neustria. Medardus was a councillor to Clotaire, the Merovingian king at Noviodunum (modern Soissons).

It is also claimed that in 532, at the death of Eleutherius, bishop of Tornacum, Medardus was invited to assume the direction of that diocese also. He refused at first, but being urged by Clotaire himself, he at last accepted. The union of the two dioceses of Noviomagus/Noyon and Tornacum/Tournai lasted until 1146, when they were again separated. Tornacum was a center for evangelizing the pagan Flemings. There, Medardus accepted Radegund of Thuringia as a deaconess and nun, until she moved to her own foundation at Saix.

== Death ==
King Clotaire, who had paid Medardus a last visit at Noviomagus, where the bishop died, had his body transferred to his own manor of Croviacum (modern Crouy), at the gates of the royal city of Noviodunum; there over his tomb was erected the celebrated Benedictine abbey which bears his name, the Abbey of Saint-Médard. The selection of the site was given authenticity through a familiar trope of hagiography:

When the procession reached Crouy, which is about three miles from Soissons, the bier became wholly immovable. The king then promised to give half the borough of Crouy to the new church. On trying again to lift the bier, it was found that the half facing the part given to the church was loose and could be moved, but the other half was as fast as ever. Clotaire now promised the whole borough to the church. The bier instantly became so light that it could be lifted and carried without any trouble to its final destination. (Walsh 1897)

== Veneration ==
Coat of arms of Lüdenscheid

Medardus was one of the most honored bishops of his time. His memory has always been popularly venerated, first in the north of France, then in Cologne and extending to western Germany, and he became the hero of numerous legends. His cultus is mentioned by both Venantius Fortunatus and Gregory of Tours. His feast day is celebrated on June 8. It is believed that, as with Swithun, whatever the weather on his feast day, it will continue for the forty days following, unless the weather changes on the feast of Saint Barnabas (11 June).

He was often depicted laughing, with his mouth wide open, therefore he was invoked against toothache. He is also invoked against bad weather (but also for rain), sterility and imprisonment. He is patron saint of vineyards, brewers, captives and prisoners, the mentally ill, and peasants. The coat of arms of the Dutch municipality of Wessem and that of the German municipality of Lüdenscheid feature St. Medardus.

The parish church of St. Medardus and St. Gildardus in Lincolnshire, England, is jointly dedicated to him and Saint Gildard.

== Legends and customs ==
As a child, Medardus was said to have once been sheltered from rain by an eagle which hovered over him. This is how he was most commonly depicted, and is why he is associated with weather, good or bad, and why he is held to protect those who work in the open air. The weather legend concerning Medardus is similar to Swithun in England. The French rhyme is: Quand il pleut à la Saint-Médard, il pleut quarante jours plus tard (If it rains on St Medardus' Day, it rains for forty days more). In Czech, the same weather lore is also found, "Medardova kápě, 40 dní kape."

Every year at Salency (Medardus' birthplace) near Noyon, France (and certain other villages) "the most virtuous young girl of the year" of the commune is elected the Rosière. The custom is said to have been started by Medardus himself, and the first Rosière is said to have been his sister, Médrine. Clothed in a long white dress, the Rosière is escorted to Mass by 12 young girls dressed in white and 12 young boys. After vespers, accompanied by two godmothers, she is crowned with a crown of 12 roses, decorated with a blue ribbon and a silver ring, at the chapel of St Médard. Then she goes to receive a bouquet of roses from the mayor, who also presents her with two arrows, two tennis balls and a whistle. She blows the whistle three times and throws nuts to the assembled crowd. The procession is followed by a fair with rides, stalls and fireworks.

== See also ==
- Saint-Médard (disambiguation), a list of places named after him
- Convulsionnaires of Saint-Médard
- Catholic Church in France
- Saint Medardus, patron saint archive

== Sources ==
- Early Life, ed. B. Krusch, Monumenta Germaniae Historica, Auctores Antiquissimi, iv (part 2), 67–73
- Butler's Lives of the Saints, vi 66–67
- William Walsh, 1897. Curiosities of Popular Customs ...
