= Whissendine railway station =

Former railway station in Leicestershire, England

Coordinates: 52.7406°N 0.7622°W

Whissendine
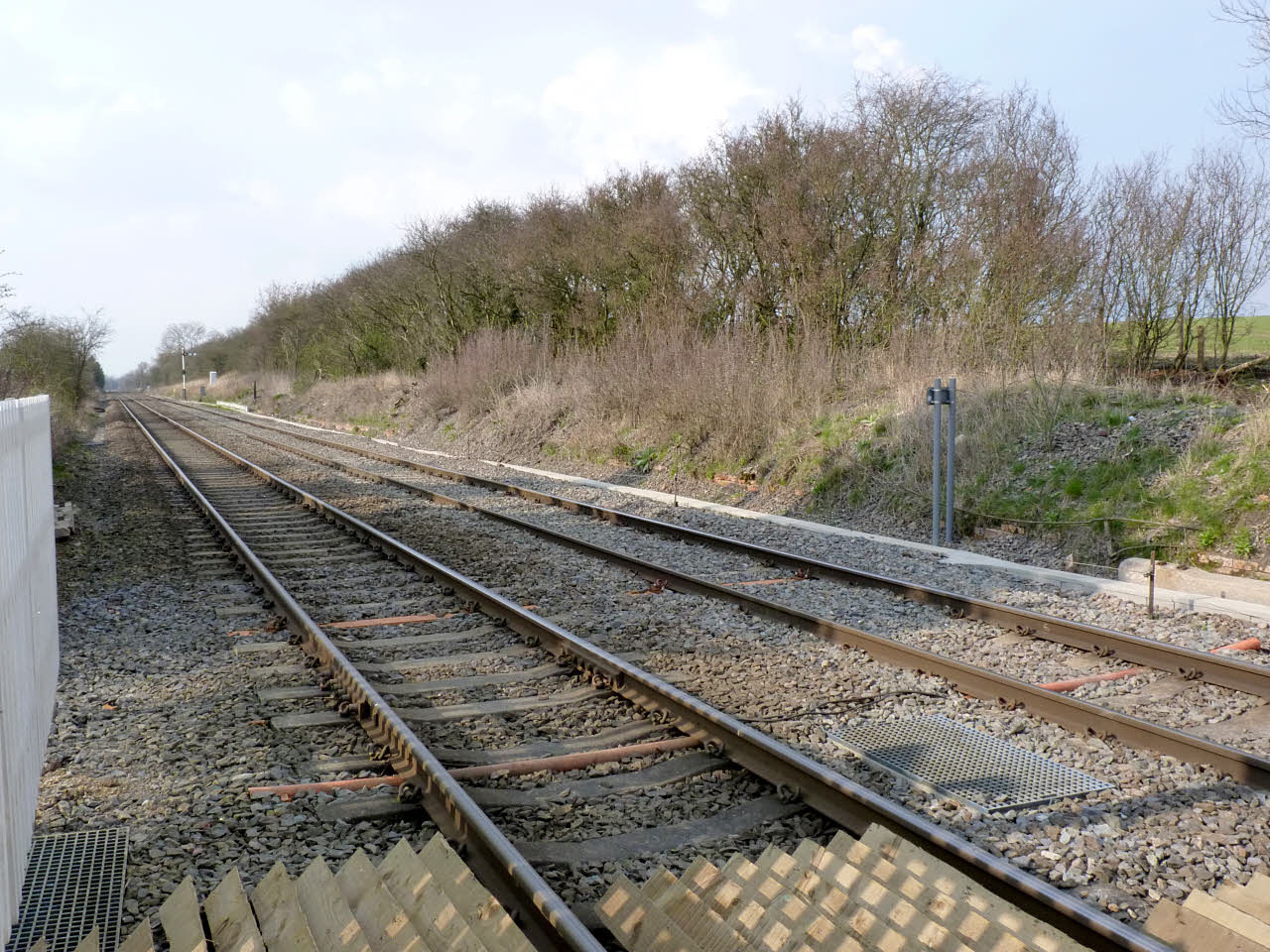
- The site of the station in 2014

General information
- Location: Whissendine, Rutland; England
- Grid reference: SK837165
- Platforms: 2

Other information
- Status: Disused

History
- Pre-grouping: Midland Railway
- Post-grouping: London, Midland and Scottish Railway; London Midland Region of British Railways

Key dates
- 1 May 1848: Opened as Wymondham
- 1 September 1848: renamed Whisendine late Wymondham
- 1 October 1878: renamed Whissendine late Wymondham
- 1 May 1891: renamed Whissendine
- 3 October 1955: Closed
Location

The location of Whissendine Station, which served the villages of Whissendine, Wymondham and Edmondthorpe from 1848–1955.

Whissendine railway station was a station serving the villages of Whissendine in Rutland and Wymondham and Edmondthorpe in Leicestershire. The station itself was about one and a half miles from each, and was in Leicestershire. It opened in 1848 on the Syston and Peterborough Railway and was originally named Wymondham but by 1863 it had been renamed Whisendine (with one s).

Preceding station	Disused railways	Following station
Saxby	Midland Railway; Leicester to Peterborough; Nottingham to Kettering	Ashwell
