= Stephen of Sawley =

Stephen of Sawley (died 6 September 1252), also known as Stephen of Easton, was a Cistercian monk, born in Eston, Yorkshire in the late twelfth century.

He had economic ties with the Fountains Abbey and when he decided to enter the monastic life, he withdrew to Fountains and was moulded there in the Cistercian way of life. Stephen held the prestigious office of cellarer at Fountains in around 1215, and in 1223 was chosen by the monks of Sawley Abbey, a granddaughter of Fountains (the abbey having been founded in 1147 by Newminster Abbey in Northumberland, itself a foundation of Fountains), to preside as abbot over their community. He held this post for ten years and during this time is known to have attended the annual General Chapter at Cîteaux in 1226 and 1230.

In 1234 Stephen left Sawley to take up the abbacy at its mother-house, Newminster, in Northumberland, and remained here until 1247 when he was elected to the abbacy of his former community, Fountains. Stephen presided as abbot of Fountains until his death in September 1252. He died at Fountains’ daughter-house, Vaudey Abbey, in Lincolnshire, where he had been conducting an annual visitation of the abbey. He was buried in Vaudey's chapter-house in front of the abbot's chair – a privileged and prominent position.

== Works ==
Four works have been attributed to Stephen:

- A series of fifteen brief meditations on the Virgin Mary, Meditationes de gaudiis beatae et gloriosae semper virginis Mariae;
- A set of three meditations on God, the Virgin, and the New Jerusalem, De modo orationis et meditationis;
- A Speculum novitii (A Mirror for Novices), which is an introduction to the monastic life for a Cistercian novice;
- A meditative guide to the psalms chanted in the Cistercian offices, De informatione mentis circa psalmodiam diei ac noctis.

The first of these is almost certainly by Stephen and the second very probably by him. The authorship of the last two remains unsettled. These demonstrate his knowledge of grammar, of the Scriptures and liturgy, the Church Fathers and also Cistercian writers. They also reflect his concern to offer instruction to monks and novices alike.

== Modern Editions ==
- Stephen of Sawley, Meditationes de gaudiis beate et gloriose semper virginis Marie, in Les meditations d'Etienne de Salley sur les Joies de la Vierge Marie, in Wilmart, Auteurs spirituels et textes devots du moyen age Latin, (Paris, 1932; reprinted in Etudes Augustiniennes, 1971), pp317–360
- Stephen of Sawley, Seculum novitii, in E Mikkers, 'Un speculum novitii inedit d'Etienne de Salley', in Collecteanea OCR 8, (1946), pp17–68
- Stephen of Sawley, Threefold exercise, in A Wilmart, 'Le triple exercice d'Etienne de Sallai', in Revue d'ascetique et de mystique 11, (1930), pp355–374
- Stephen of Sawley, Treatises, trans Jeremiah F O'Sullivan, (Kalamazoo, MI: Cistercian Publications, 1984) [which contains English translations of the three works above]
