= Castle Bytham railway station =

Former railway station in Lincolnshire, England

Coordinates: 52.75192°N 0.53465°W

Castle Bytham
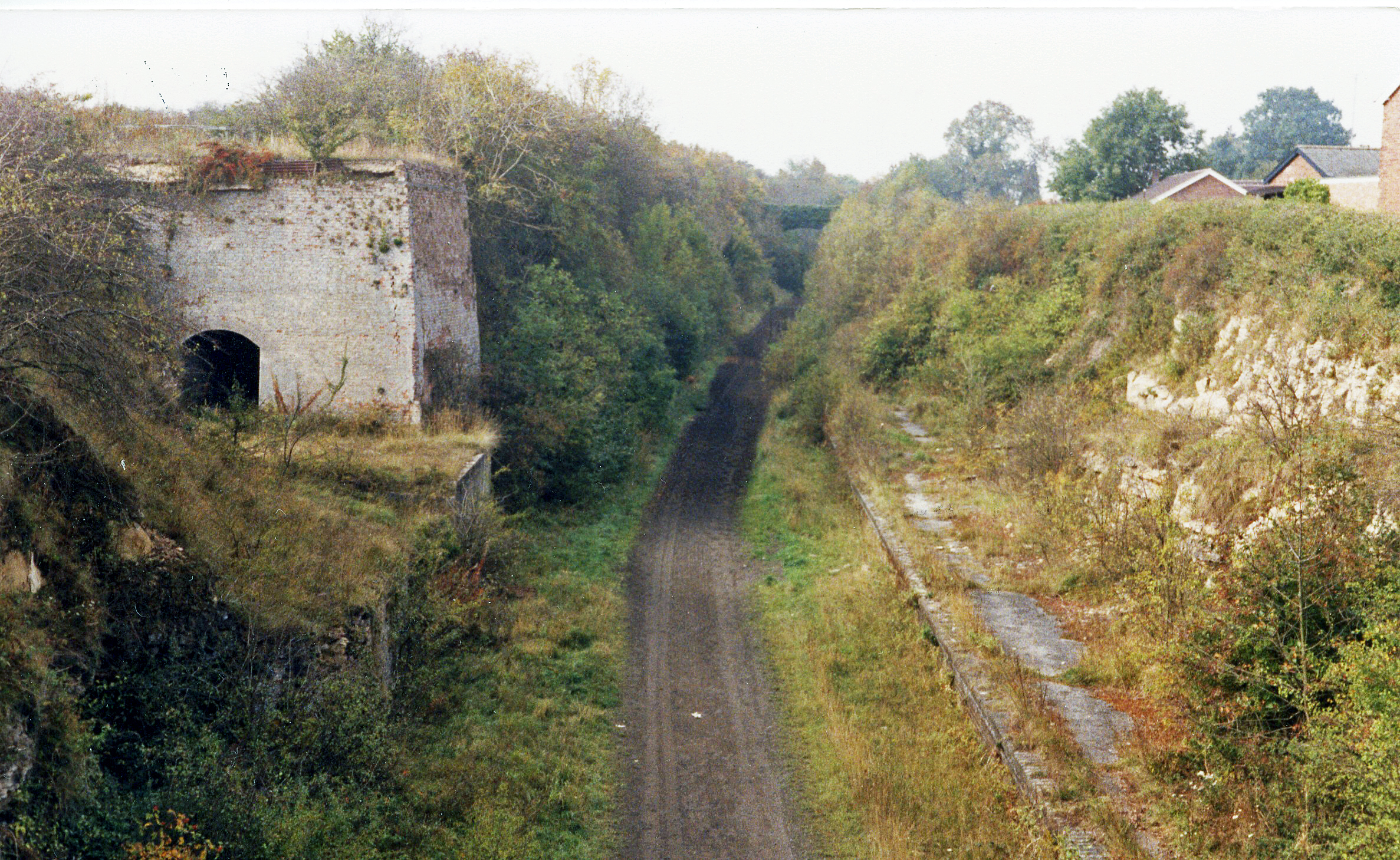
- Station site in 1986.

General information
- Location: Castle Bytham, South Kesteven; England
- Grid reference: SK990181
- Platforms: 1

Other information
- Status: Disused

History
- Original company: Midland Railway
- Pre-grouping: Midland Railway
- Post-grouping: London, Midland and Scottish Railway

Key dates
- 4 April 1898: Opened
- 2 March 1959: Closed
Location

Castle Bytham railway station was a station in Castle Bytham. It was Midland Railway property but train services were operated by the Midland and Great Northern Joint Railway (M&GN). The station and line closed in 1959 along with most of the M&GN.

== History ==
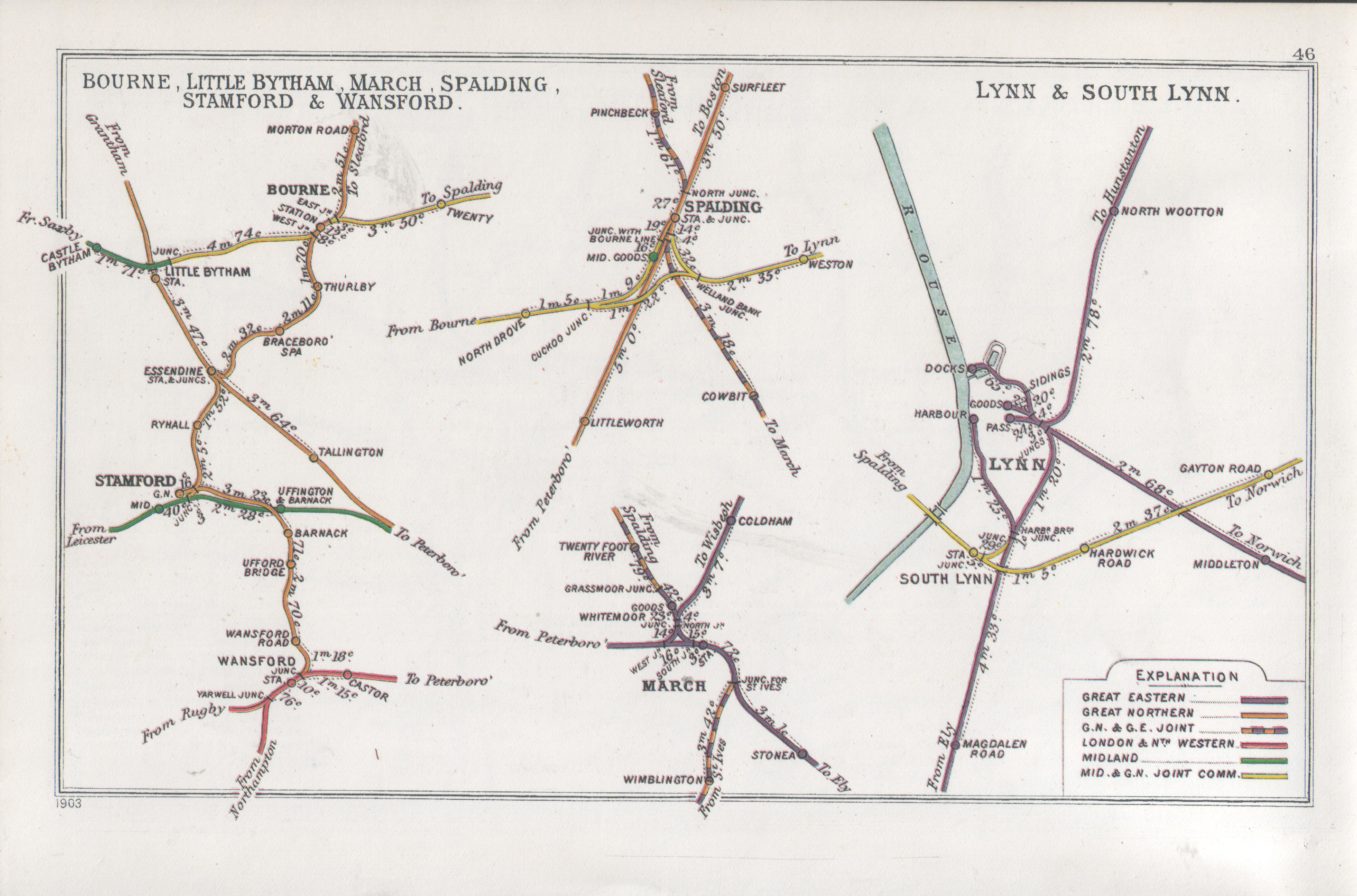
A 1903 Railway Clearing House map of railways in the vicinity of Castle Bytham (left). Midland Railway in green; M&GN in yellow.

This station was rather unusual, being a single platform in a cutting through the village. The station was not originally planned by the railway, but was added after considerable local lobbying. Outside the village, the line of the railway now forms a road crossing under the A1.

The line officially became M&GN property a few miles east at Little Bytham Junction, where it crossed the Great Northern Railway main line. The GNR had powers to make a junction here but never did so. The nearest station on the GNR was Little Bytham.

=== World War II ===
A train was machine-gunned on December 23 1940, with a soldier killed.

== Routes ==
| Preceding station | Disused railways | Following station |
|---|---|---|
| South Witham | Midland and Great Northern Joint Railway | Bourne |
