= Elsthorpe =

Hamlet in the South Kesteven district of Lincolnshire, England

Coordinates: 52.801104°N 0.430165°W

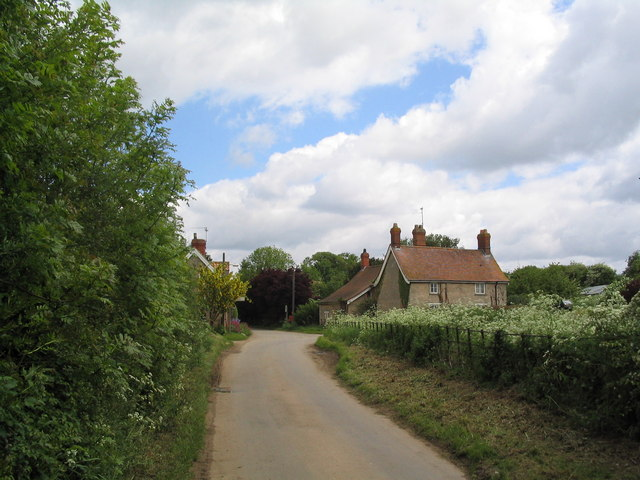
- Elsthorpe

- Location within Lincolnshire
- OS grid reference: TF059237
  - London: 85 mi (137 km) S
- Civil parish: Edenham
- District: South Kesteven
- Shire county: Lincolnshire
- Region: East Midlands
- Country: England
- Sovereign state: United Kingdom
- Post town: Bourne
- Postcode district: PE10
- Police: Lincolnshire
- Fire: Lincolnshire
- Ambulance: East Midlands
- UK Parliament: Grantham and Stamford

Elsthorpe is a hamlet in the South Kesteven district of Lincolnshire, England. It is situated 5 miles (8 km) north-west from the town of Bourne, and in the civil parish of Edenham.

Elsthorpe lies less than 1 mile (1.6 km) from the earthworks of the Elsthorpe deserted medieval village (DMV). These, on a hill ridge, consist of a sunken road, sites of buildings, and fish ponds.
