= Little Bytham =

Village and civil parish in the South Kesteven district of Lincolnshire, England

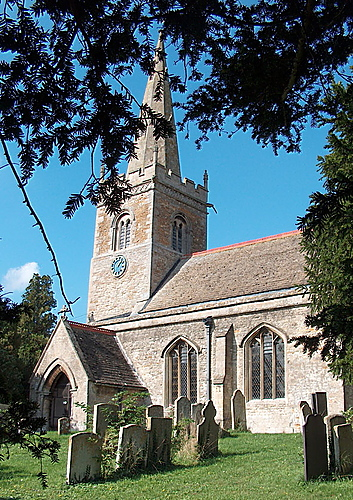
- Church of Saints Medardus and Gildardus, Little Bytham

- Location within Lincolnshire
- Population: 384 (2011)
- OS grid reference: TF012179
  - London: 85 mi (137 km) S
- District: South Kesteven
- Shire county: Lincolnshire
- Region: East Midlands
- Country: England
- Sovereign state: United Kingdom
- Post town: Grantham
- Postcode district: NG33
- Police: Lincolnshire
- Fire: Lincolnshire
- Ambulance: East Midlands
- UK Parliament: Grantham and Stamford

Little Bytham is a village and civil parish in the South Kesteven district of Lincolnshire, England. The population of the civil parish at the 2011 census was 384. It lies on the B1176 road, 4 miles (6 km) south from Corby Glen and 6 miles (10 km) north from Stamford .

The East Coast Main Line railway cuts through the eastern side of the village over viaducts. On the edge of Little Bytham to the east is the West Glen River. Further east lie Witham on the Hill and Grimsthorpe Castle estate. To the west is Castle Bytham and, over the Rutland county boundary, is Clipsham. Careby is just to the south.

The name 'Bytham' is first recorded in 1067 (as a monastery that rapidly translated to Vaudey Abbey), and comes from the Old English word bythme meaning Valley bottom, broad valley.

== Church of St Medard and St Gildard ==
The church is a Grade I listed building. It is dedicated to two 6th-century French saints, St Medard and St Gildard (or Medardus and Gildardus); the dedication is unique in the UK. Virtually unknown in Britain, St Medard is still well known in France, with at least 25 towns or villages named after him (as St Médard or St Méard). Gildard, thought to be his brother, is less well known. The village fête is held annually on or near St Medard's feast day, 8 June.

The earliest parts of the building are some Anglo-Saxon "long-and-short" stonework, visible externally at the southeast and southwest corners (quoins) of the nave. The church also has several Romanesque details dating from the Norman era, including a Priest's Door ("uncommonly ornate", according to Nikolaus Pevsner) with a finely carved tympanum; the empty circular niche in the tympanum is said to have held a relic; the birds in roundels to either side are probably eagles, as one is legendarily supposed to have sheltered Medard from the rain. Also Norman are the plain, undecorated arch into the tower, and the north door (late 12th century).

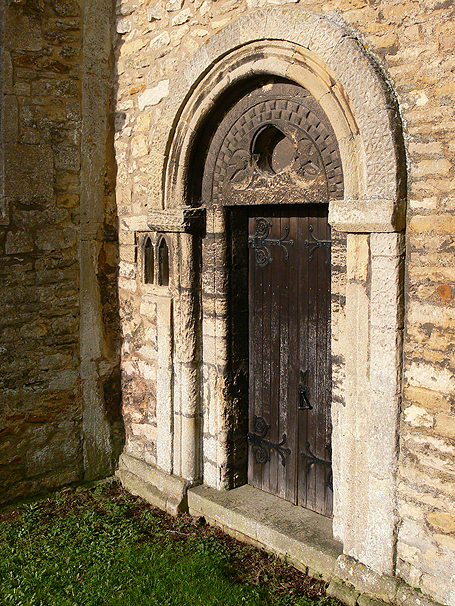
The circular niche above the Priest's Door may once have held a relic of St Medard. Anglo-Saxon long-and-short stonework is visible in the corner to the left.

The south aisle and the upper parts of the tower and spire are 13th century work; the intersecting tracery of the east window of the south aisle shows that it is slightly later, dating from around 1300, as does the nearby piscina. The chancel arch is probably also from the late 13th century, and the double piscina in the chancel may be of a similar age. The Easter Sepulchre in the chancel is in the slightly later (Decorated) style, but is a fairly crude example. A finely sculpted capital depicting a Green Man surrounded by oak leaves, similar to examples at nearby Kirkby Underwood and Greatford, also dates from c.1300. It is no longer in position, having been built into a wall, face inwards, and rediscovered during later restoration work.

The stone base of the pulpit is dated 1590, and has a Latin inscription Orate et parate ("Pray and prepare"). Pevsner mistakenly gives this as Orate et Arate.

== Railway and other industrial history ==
The Great Northern Railway main line (now the East Coast Main Line) and the Midland and Great Northern Joint Railway (closed 1959) crossed here. The GNR had powers to make a junction but never did so. Little Bytham railway station on the GNR closed in 1959, and most of its buildings have since been demolished. There was no station here on the M&GNJR, the nearest being Castle Bytham railway station. From 1857 to 1884, Little Bytham station was the junction for the Edenham & Little Bytham Railway branch line to Edenham.

Remains of the M&GNJR and E&LBR are still visible, most obviously near the junction of the road from Little Bytham to Witham on the Hill, where there is a large M&GN embankment with a road bridge across the B1176 52°44′50″N 0°29′40″W and a river bridge across the River Glen within a quarter of a mile 52°44′52″N 0°29′29″W, with an E&LBR cutting and road bridge a little further up the hill 52°44′45″N 0°28′57″W to the east.

The LNER Class A4 4468 Mallard locomotive made its record-breaking run south through the village on 3 July 1938. It reached 126 mph (203 km/h), the fastest ever officially recorded for a steam locomotive, just south of the village at milepost 90¼, where a sign beside the track was erected in 1998 to mark the 60th anniversary of the event, and the exact spot (between Aunby and Carlby) in Lincolnshire where The Mallard reached its highest speed.

In 1933 a trial return run between London and Leeds was made with modified A1 locomotive number 4472, Flying Scotsman on the return trip with 6 coaches weighing 208 tons; it achieved 100 mph (160 km/h) just outside Little Bytham in Lincolnshire for just over 600 yards (550 m). There were earlier claims to this speed, notably by the Great Western locomotive 3440 City of Truro, but this 1933 run is generally considered to be the first reliably recorded instance. On a later trial run to Newcastle upon Tyne and back in 1935, A3 number 2750 Papyrus reached 108 miles per hour (174 km/h) hauling 217 tons at the same spot, maintaining a speed above 100 mph (160 km/h) for 12.5 consecutive miles (20.1 km), the world record for a non-streamlined locomotive.

A brickworks north of the village, established in 1850 and active into the early 20th century, made small, high-fired paving bricks, called "Adamantine Clinkers" (because of their hardness), for paving stables and other floors. The works are mentioned in the Lincolnshire article in the 1911 Encyclopædia Britannica. They advertised that they had won Gold and Silver medals, and supplied "His Majesty the King and other members of the Royal Family; also to the principal Nobility of this and Foreign Countries." The works are now demolished and houses have been built on the site.

== Community ==
Former clay workings, an uneven area now overgrown with woodland, has been developed as The Spinney, a nature reserve, picnic site and children's adventure playground, through a grant from the Millennium Commission. A Heritage Orchard, with historic, mainly local, cultivars of apples, pears, plums, cherries and gages, has been planted at the site and a small sensory garden is also being developed.

Stanton's Pit, 1.5 miles (2.4 km) south-east of the village, is a former gravel pit operated as a wetland Nature Reserve by the Lincolnshire Wildlife Trust.

Mixed arable farming is still carried out around the village. In 2000–02, a local farm suffered cross contamination from nearby GM trials.

There is a village hall, a motor engineer, a stonemason and a garden nursery. The village telephone box has been earmarked for closure

The former Mallard pub in the centre of the village, named after the record-breaking locomotive, closed in 2002; it was previously called the Green Man.
