= Festival of the Unexceptional =

Classic car show celebrating ordinary cars

Festival of the Unexceptional: A Concours de l'Ordinaire

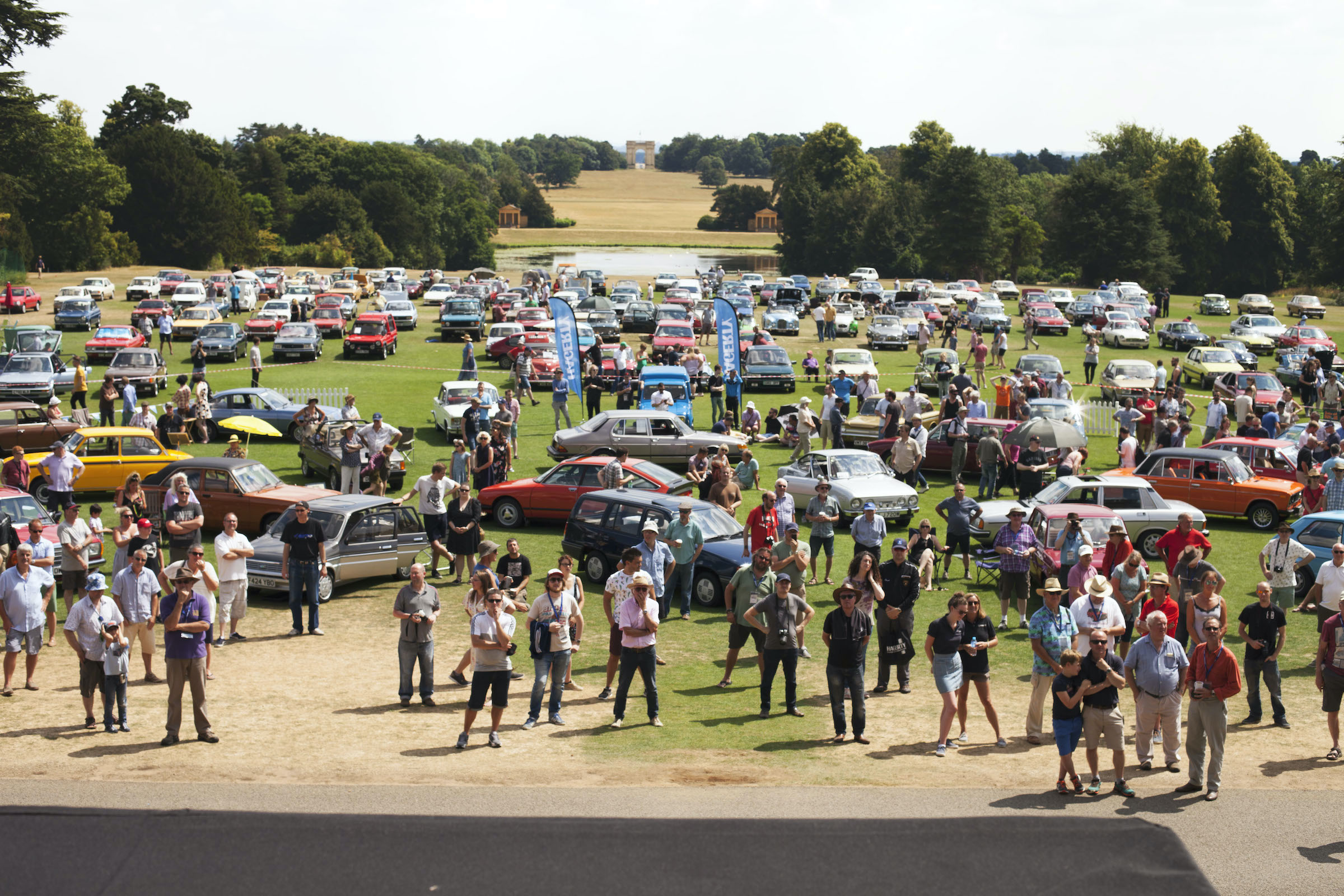
The 2018 Festival of the Unexceptional at Stowe School in Buckinghamshire

The Festival of the Unexceptional is a Concours d'Elegance-style car show held in England, featuring classic cars from the 1960s, 1970s, 1980s and 1990s that were considered ordinary when new, but are now quite rare.

== Concept ==
The festival is the idea of Hagerty Insurance, who "wanted to raise the profile of vehicles which are not seen at Pebble Beach, Hampton Court, Goodwood or other such prestigious Concours events [...] ordinary cars to whom a large majority of people can truly relate; the first car you drove, your parent’s car or simply the car you admired on your neighbour’s drive". Regular judge and motoring writer Sam Skelton said that "we want to see the cars which littered street corners a couple of decades ago" and that the festival "celebrates those cars which were ubiquitous when new, and apathy has made rare in their old age". The festival has two arenas where cars are displayed: a Concours de l'Ordinaire of about fifty selected vehicles, and a general car park of ordinary classics. The Concours de l'Ordinaire is open to 'unexceptional' cars made between 1966 and 1996.

== History ==
The inaugural event took place at Whittlebury Park, Northamptonshire, on 26 July 2014 and was attended by 300 people. Cars on the concours included Princess Diana's Austin Metro displayed by Coventry Transport Museum and the very small Peel P50 displayed by the National Motor Museum, Beaulieu. A range of other cars took part such as a Fiat Strada, Ford Cortina, Renault 6 and Vauxhall Chevette. The winner of the first concours was a Nissan Cherry Europe GTi, with the runner-up spot taken by a 1975 Austin Maxi.

The event returned in 2015 with over fifty cars showcased in the concours, with Best in Show awarded to a 1978 Ford Escort 1600 and second place going to a 1978 Fiat 127. A 1974 Hillman Avenger Super Estate took the People's Choice award. The winning Escort's owner described the car as "something of a family heirloom" that had been bought new by his father and later restored after it was nearly written off following an accident.

At the 2016 event there were forty-five cars displayed on the concours; Best in Show was won by a 1980 Morris Marina pick-up and second place was taken by a 1979 VW Golf L. The People's Choice was awarded to a 1968 Hillman Minx estate. A new feature introduced this year was the Feast of the Unexceptional, a competition of 1970s-style picnics brought by visitors.

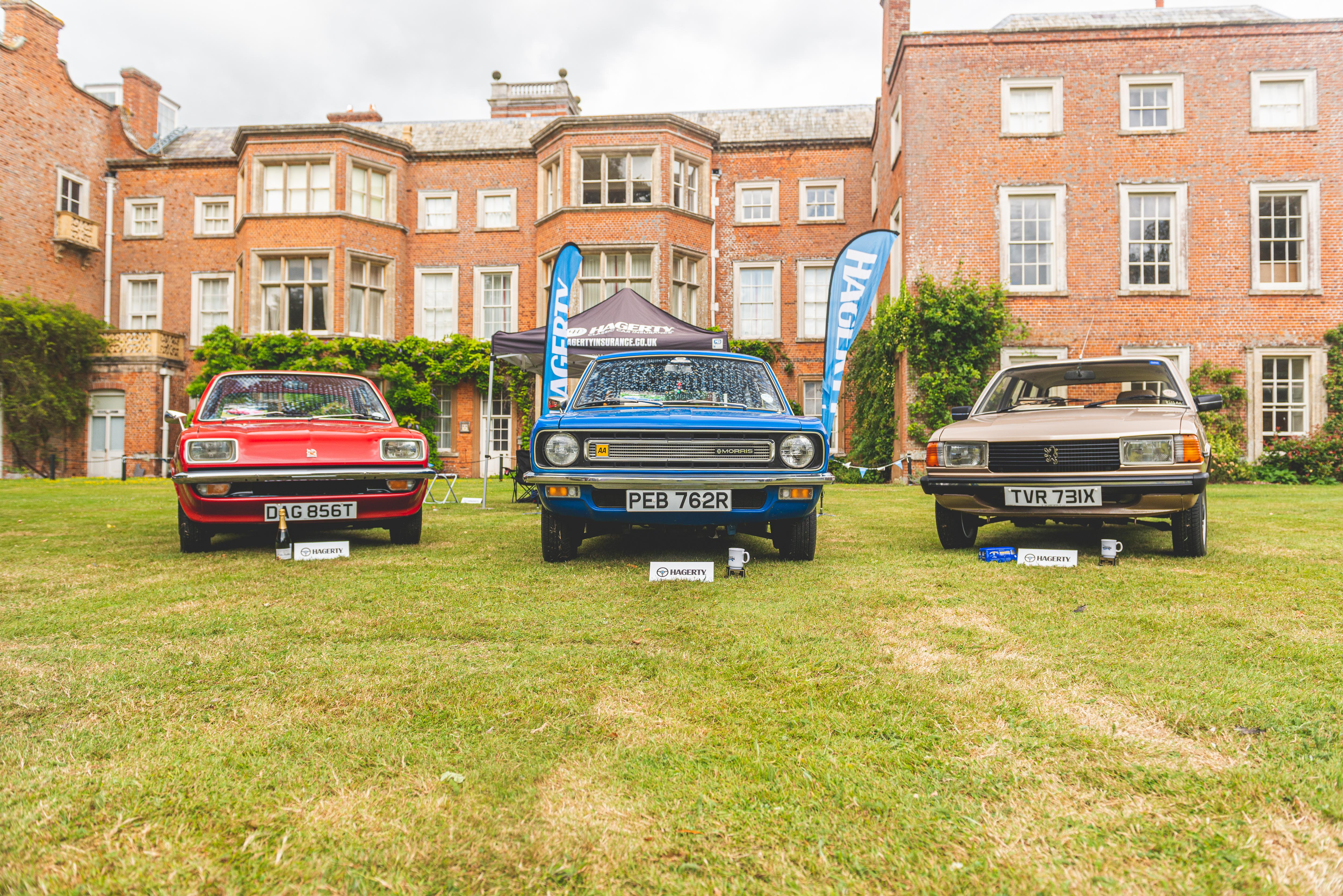
2019 Concours de l'Ordinaire podium finishers

In 2017 the event took place in the grounds of Stowe School in Buckinghamshire. A new feature was the selection of five cars from the car park that were invited to join the cars on the concours. The Best in Show award went to a 1983 Datsun Sunny 1.5 GL, with second place taken by a 1972 Daf 33 and the People's Choice awarded to a 1972 Austin Allegro SS.

The 2018 event was again held at Stowe School. Fifty cars took part in the main concours; Best in Show was a 1977 Chrysler Alpine, one of only thirteen Alpines left on UK roads, which had been fully restored by an enthusiast of the marque who had spent over 1,000 hours working on the car and had sourced the seat fabric from the last roll of original material from France. Second place went to a 1981 Datsun Bluebird GL saloon and the People's Choice award was won by a 1982 Fiat Strada 65CL. Over 2,000 people attended the event.

In 2019 the event moved to the Claydon Estate in Buckinghamshire. Best in Show was won by a 1977 Morris Marina 1.3 Deluxe Estate, which the owner had rescued from being scrapped when the garage that housed it was scheduled for demolition. In second place was a 1978 Vauxhall Chevette E and the People's Choice award was won by a 1982 Peugeot 305 SR Estate. A new concours class introduced this year was the Anniversary Class, for vehicle models that were celebrating significant anniversaries, such as fifty years since introduction.

The 2020 event was cancelled due to the COVID-19 pandemic.

Since the 2021 show, the event took place at Grimsthorpe Castle in Lincolnshire. A 1989 Proton Saloon, 'Black Knight' special edition took the Concours de l'ordinare prize. The car, which had covered only 13,000 miles from new, is the last remaining example of 201 made.

In 2022 the winner was a three-door 1994 Vauxhall Astra Merit 1.4 and 2023 the winner was a 1991 Daihatsu Applause. For the first time a special Chairman’s award was given to an immaculate 1997 Suzuki Baleno Saloon which was restored by a team of school friends.

The 2024 event was the 10th anniversary event and took place on the 27th July, at Grimsthorpe Castle for the fourth time. The winner was a 1982 Toyota Hilux. For 2025 the winner was a 1992 Skoda Favorit Forum.

The 2026 event took place on 25 July and was reported as being the largest yet with 2,500 cars reported to have attended. A 2001 Volkswagen Polo E was awarded first place, a 1992 Toyota Previa in second place with a 2001 Ford Focus in third.

== Concours de l'Ordinaire winners ==
2014 - Nissan Cherry Europe (1985)
2015 - Ford Escort (1978)
2016 - Morris 575 pickup (1980)
2017 - Datsun Sunny (1983)
2018 - Chrysler Alpine (1977)
2019 - Morris Marina Estate (1977)
2020 - no show due to Covid
2021 - Proton Black Knight (1989)
2022 - Vauxhall Astra (1994)
2023 - Daihatsu Applause (1991)
2024 - Toyota Hilux (1982)
2025 - Skoda Favorit (1992)
2026 - Volkswagen Polo (2001)
