= Edenham railway station =

Former railway station in Lincolnshire, England

Coordinates: 52.7862°N 0.4320°W

Edenham
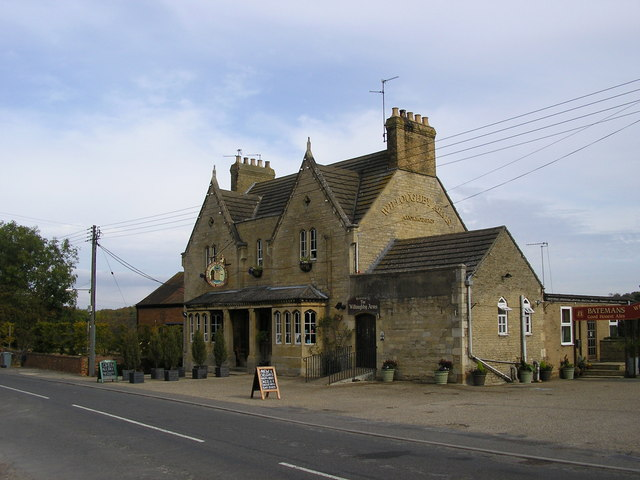
- The station building, now the Willoughby Arms, in 2009

General information
- Location: Edenham, Lincolnshire; England
- Grid reference: TF058221
- Platforms: 1

Other information
- Status: Disused

History
- Pre-grouping: Edenham & Little Bytham Railway
- Post-grouping: Closed

Key dates
- 8 December 1857: Opened
- 17 October 1871: Closed
Location

Edenham railway station was a station in Edenham, Lincolnshire. It was the terminus of a four-mile branch line from the Great Northern Railway at Little Bytham. The line was built and operated by the Edenham & Little Bytham Railway (E&LBR). It was opened on 8 December 1857. The station closed to passengers on 17 October 1871. Freight traffic continued until about 1884, when the line closed.

Preceding station	Disused railways	Following station
Terminus	Edenham & Little Bytham Railway	Little Bytham; Line and station closed

== Bibliography ==
- Rodney Edward Pearson; John Greenfield Ruddock (1986). Lord Willoughby's Railway. ISBN 978-0-9511656-0-7.
