= Saint Gildard =

Confessor
- Born: c. 448
- Died: c. 525; Rouen, Normandy, France
- Venerated in: Roman Catholic Church
- Major shrine: Abbey of St. Medard, Soissons
- Feast: June 8

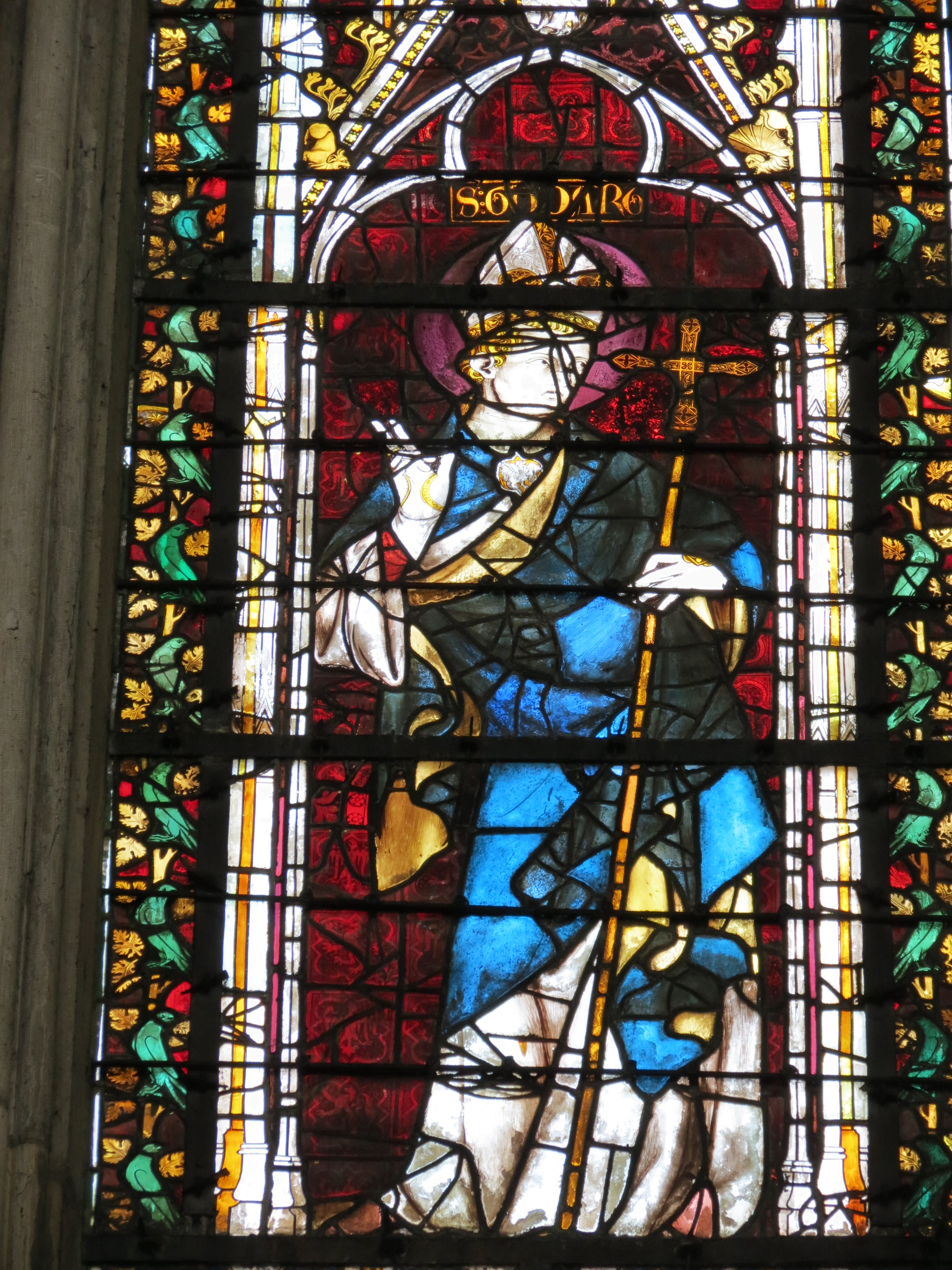

Gildard or Gildardus, or Gildaredus also known as Godard or Godardus (c. 448 – c. 525), was the Bishop of Rouen from 488 to 525. He is venerated as a saint of the Roman Catholic Church, and the missal of the Sarum Rite refers to him as a confessor. He is closely connected to Medard, who was traditionally considered to be his brother.

== Life ==
Earlier versions of the Roman Martyrology contend that Gildard was the twin brother of Medard—that they were born on the same day, were consecrated bishop on the same day, and died on the same day. However, in 511 Gildard attended the First Council of Orléans, convoked by Clovis I; only in 530 was Medard consecrated. Gildard is commemorated in Rouen, with his supposed brother. Alban Butler adds that he "governed the see of Rouen with great zeal during the space of fifteen years."

His body was buried at St. Mary's Church in Rouen, which later was named after him. According to Butler, his body was removed during Norman incursions and moved to the Abbey of St. Medard in Soissons, where it remains.

== Cult ==
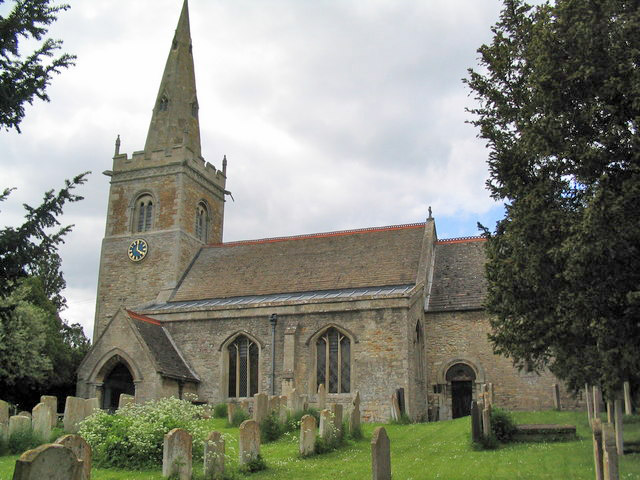
Church of St Medard and St Gildard, Little Bytham

According to Felice Lifshitz, the main reason for the veneration of Gildard is his association with Medard. Prior to the emergence of widespread belief in this association, no cult of Gildard was promoted, and his relics were kept in the church of Notre Dame (St. Mary) in suburban Rouen without attracting any attention. They were removed to the Abbey of St. Medard in Soissons precisely because of the supposed sibling connection; when the monks of St. Medard discovered this link, they argued successfully with Charles the Bald that the brothers be reunited in death. Apparently the people of Rouen were not happy to see their saint go, and made the offer that the monks of St. Medard leave them the head of Gildard, for which they would give them the head of Romanus of Rouen, one of their bishops, or the entire body of Remigius of Rouen, their third archbishop. In Soissons, Gildard "was provided for the first time with literary traditions and [here] his cult was promoted."

=== Churches named for Medard and Gildard ===
- Church of Saint-Médard-et-Saint-Gildard, in Crépon, Calvados, France; 12th–14th century.
- Church of Saint-Médard-et-Saint-Gildard, in Fel, Orne, France; 12th century (today only Saint-Médard, apparently).
- Church of St Medard and St Gildard, parish church in Little Bytham, Lincolnshire, England; dating back to Anglo-Saxon period.
