= Wymondham, Leicestershire =

Village in Leicestershire, England

Coordinates: 52.760°N 0.741°W

Wymondham
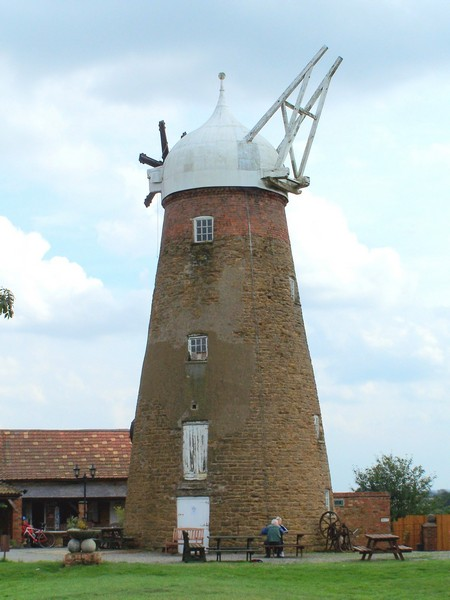
- Wymondham windmill

- Location within Leicestershire
- Population: 623 (2001 Census)
- OS grid reference: SK850187
- District: Melton
- Shire county: Leicestershire
- Region: East Midlands
- Country: England
- Sovereign state: United Kingdom
- Post town: MELTON MOWBRAY
- Postcode district: LE14
- Dialling code: 01572
- Police: Leicestershire
- Fire: Leicestershire
- Ambulance: East Midlands
- UK Parliament: Melton and Syston

Wymondham (pronounced, phonetically, /ˈwaɪməndˌəm/) is a village in the Borough of Melton in Leicestershire, England. It is part of a civil parish which also covers the nearby hamlet of Edmondthorpe. The parish has a population of 623, increasing to 632 at the 2011 census. It is close to the county boundaries with Lincolnshire and Rutland, nearby places being Garthorpe, Teigh (in Rutland) and South Witham (in Lincolnshire).

== Description ==
The village church is St Peter's; the pub is the Berkeley Arms. There is a windmill that has been converted into a visitor attraction with tea room and craft shops. A part-time mobile Post Office visits the village twice a week. Wymondham has a primary school and a pre-school group. There is also a large playing field named after Sir John Sedley.

=== Manor ===
The manor of Wymondham was held by the Hamelin family in the 1200s. The south transept of the parish church had a chantry chapel founded by William Hamelin in 1290, who gave land in Wymondham, Saxby and Thorp Edmer for a chaplain to celebrate mass in perpetuity on his behalf. By 1553 the chantry was no longer in existence possibly as a result of the Reformation when saying masses for the departed was abolished. In 1297, Sir John Hamelin held half of a knight's fee of Edmund, Earl of Lancaster, brother of King Edward Longshanks, in Wymondham, and the other half was held by Sir William de Hamelin, by homage and suit of court. His coat of arms was one of many of the Hamlin/Hamelin family, and was eventually transmitted to the Hamlyn baronets.

In the south transept of the church is a monument in the form of a large effigy of a knight, cross-legged, dating from the late 13th century; this was Sir John Hamelin who was supposedly a crusader on three occasions. Sir John's daughter and heiress, Isabel Hamelin, carried the manor to her husband, Sir Thomas Berkeley, a son of Thomas de Berkeley, 1st Baron Berkeley in whose family it remained for centuries. Sir Thomas Berkeley (died 1488) was an English lawyer and politician who represented Leicestershire in Parliament and served as Sheriff for Rutland, Warwickshire, and Leicestershire.

The public house in Wymondham is named The Berkeley Arms.

=== St Peter's church ===
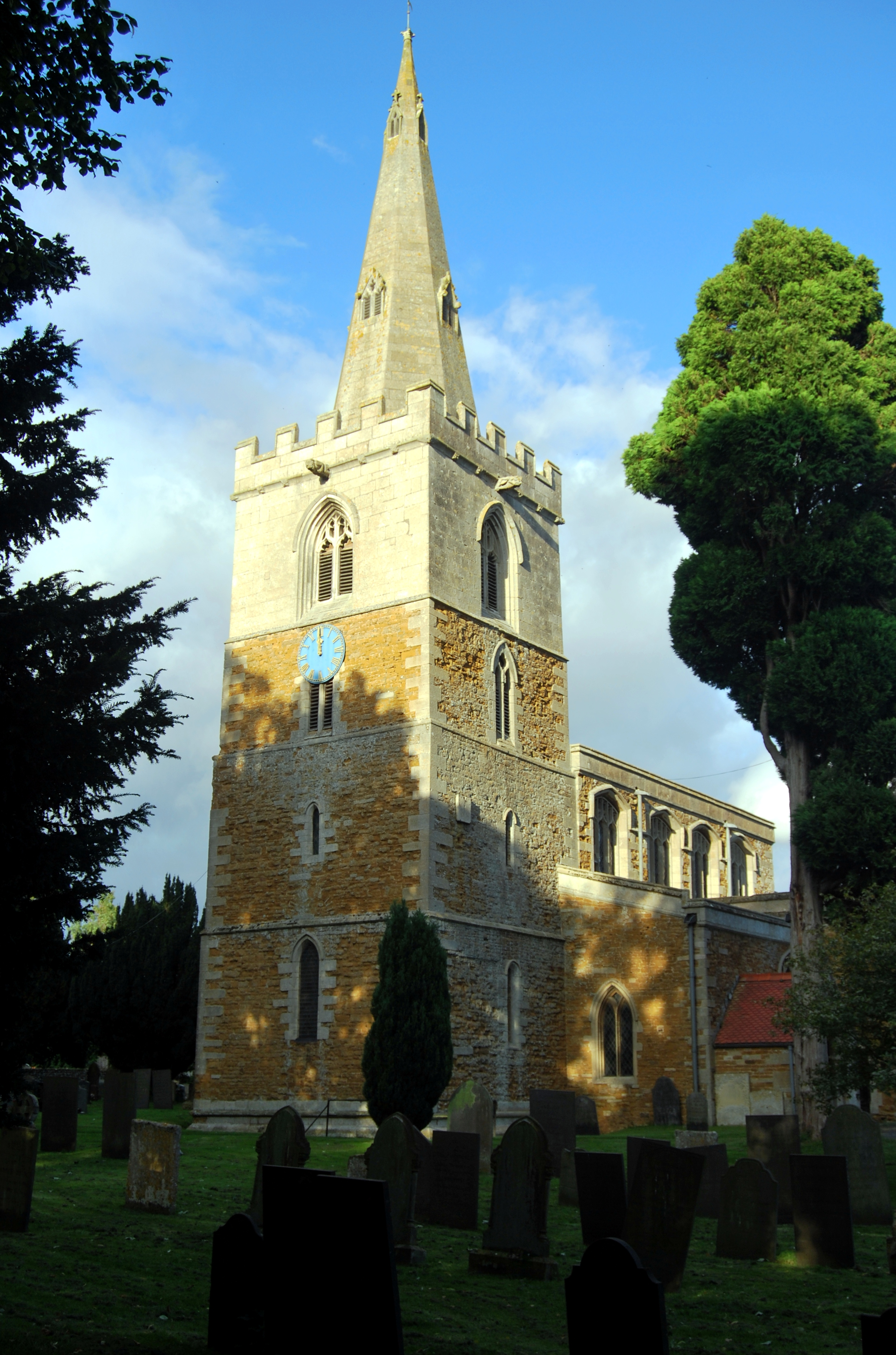
St Peter's Church

The parish church dates back to the 13th century and was built in the "Early English style on a cruciform plan"; the third storey of the tower and the spire are in the Perpendicular style. The church priest is also responsible for Buckminster and Sewstern (South Framland). The church saw the wedding of footballer Michael Carrick and Lisa Roughead in June 2007.

A new clock by John Smith and Sons, Derby was obtained for a cost of £121 (equivalent to £12,720 in 2025). It displayed the time on two dials on the outside of the tower and chimed the Cambridge Quarters and struck the hours. The clock was started by Hon Mrs. Gretton of Stapleford Park on 23 November 1906.

=== Disused railway ===
A disused railway line, part of the Midland and Great Northern Joint Railway branch line between Saxby and Bourne, runs just to the north of the village. The Edmondthorpe and Wymondham railway station closed to passengers in 1959 though the line remained open for ironstone freight, and Queen Elizabeth journeyed along it in 1967. The route was also used for holiday trips from Leicester to Skegness. The former goods yard, goods shed, station, Station House and Navvies' Cottage (Grade II Listed) are passed when travelling from the village along Butt Lane towards the windmill.

=== Stilton cheese ===
Frances Pawlett (or Paulet), a "skilled cheese maker" of Wymondham, has traditionally been credited as the person who set modern Stilton cheese's shape and style characteristics in the 1720s, but others have also been named.
