= Little Bytham railway station =

Former railway station in Lincolnshire, England

Coordinates: 52.7440°N 0.4935°W

Little Bytham
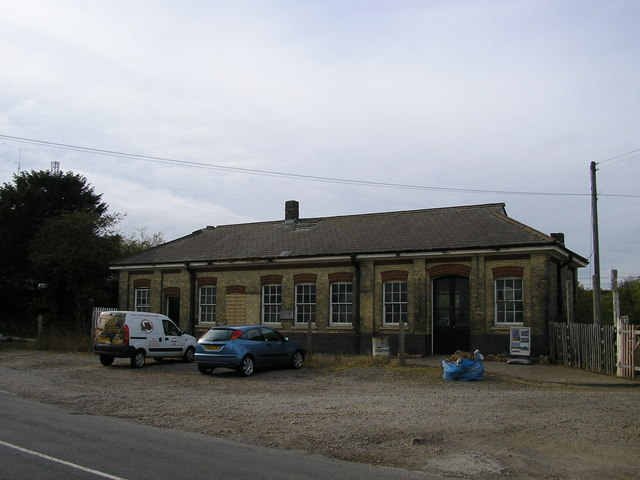

General information
- Location: Little Bytham, Lincolnshire; England
- Grid reference: TF018173
- Platforms: 3

Other information
- Status: Disused

History
- Pre-grouping: Great Northern Railway
- Post-grouping: London North Eastern Railway; Eastern Region of British Railways

Key dates
- 2 October 1853: Opened
- 15 June 1959: Closed
Location

Little Bytham railway station was a station in Little Bytham, Lincolnshire on the Great Northern Railway main line. It closed in 1959. The Midland and Great Northern Joint Railway crossed just north of the station. The GNR were given powers to build a junction but never did so. The nearest station on the M&GNR was at Castle Bytham.

From 1857 to 1884, Little Bytham was the junction for the Edenham & Little Bytham Railway branch line to Edenham. The public house now called The Willoughby Arms, but then The Steam Engine was built as the terminus, although the track crossed into the GNR goods yard for interchange purposes.

| Preceding station | Historical railways | Following station |
|---|---|---|
| Essendine; Line open, station closed | Great Northern Railway; Great Northern main line | Corby Glen; Line open, station closed |
| | Disused railways | |
| Terminus | Edenham & Little Bytham Railway | Edenham; Line and station closed |
