= Salency =

- Commune
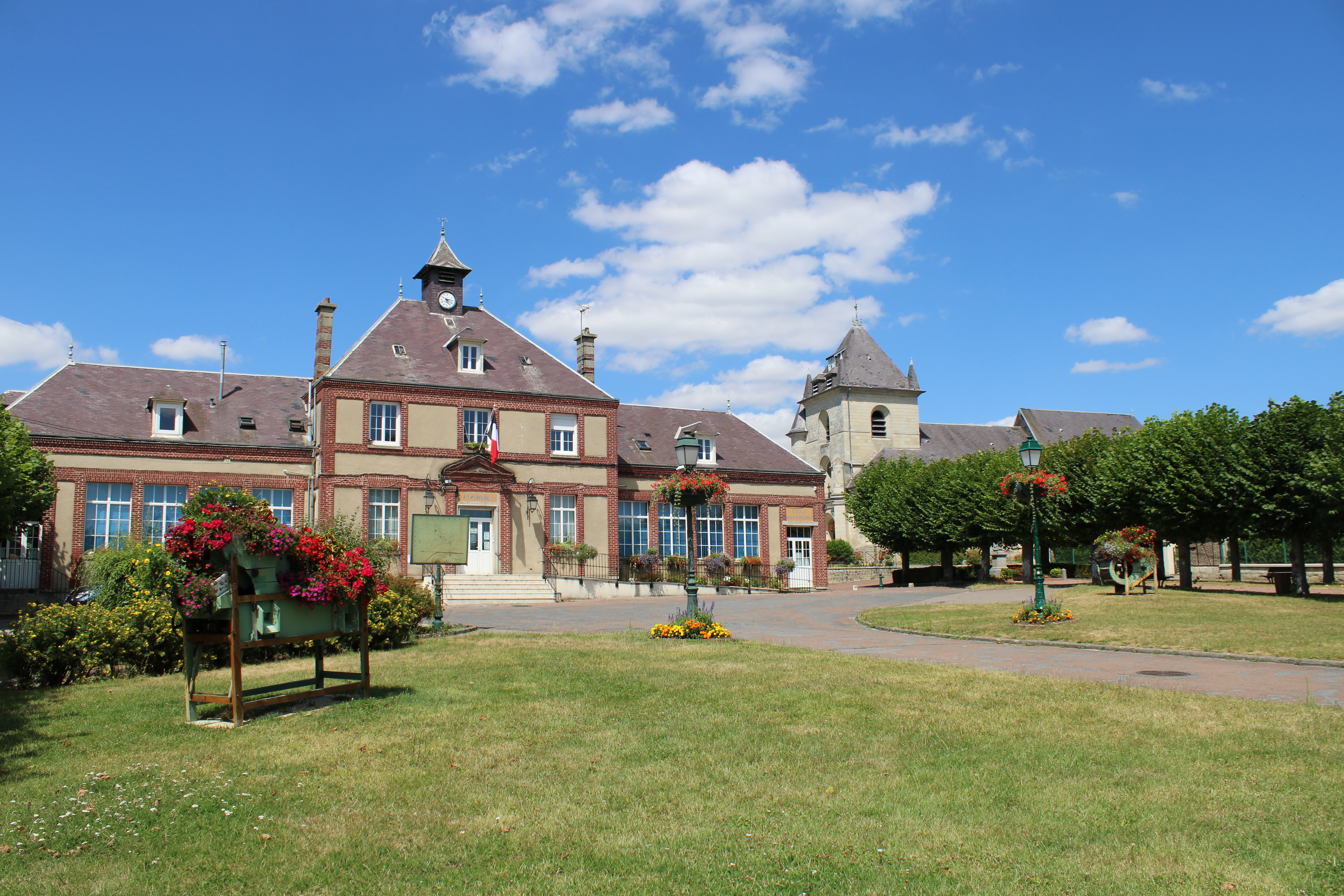
- Town hall

- Coat of arms
- Location of Salency
- Location within France Location within Hauts-de-France
- Coordinates: 49°35′19″N 3°03′04″E
- Country: France
- Region: Hauts-de-France
- Department: Oise
- Arrondissement: Compiègne
- Canton: Noyon
- Intercommunality: Pays Noyonnais

Government
  - Mayor (2020–2026): Hervé Deplanque
- Area^{1}: 7.79 km^{2} (3.01 sq mi)
- Elevation: 68 m (223 ft)
- Highest elevation: 178 m (584 ft)
- Lowest elevation: 36 m (118 ft)
- Population (2023): 897
  - Density: 115/km^{2} (298/sq mi)
- Time zone: UTC+01:00 (CET)
  - Summer (DST): UTC+02:00 (CEST)
- INSEE/Postal code: 60603 /60400
- ^{1} French Land Register data, which excludes lakes, ponds, glaciers > 1 km^{2} (0.386 sq mi or 247 acres) and river estuaries.

Salency (French pronunciation: [salɑ̃si]) is a commune in the Oise department in northern France.

== Demography ==
Historical population
| Year | Pop. | ±% p.a. |
|---|---|---|
| 1968 | 693 | — |
| 1975 | 801 | +2.09% |
| 1982 | 849 | +0.83% |
| 1990 | 861 | +0.18% |
| 1999 | 891 | +0.38% |
| 2007 | 905 | +0.20% |
| 2012 | 882 | −0.51% |
| 2017 | 890 | +0.18% |
| 2023 | 897 | +0.13% |
Source: INSEE

== See also ==
- Communes of the Oise department
