= South Witham railway station =

Former railway station in Lincolnshire, England

Coordinates: 52.7605°N 0.6314°W

South Witham
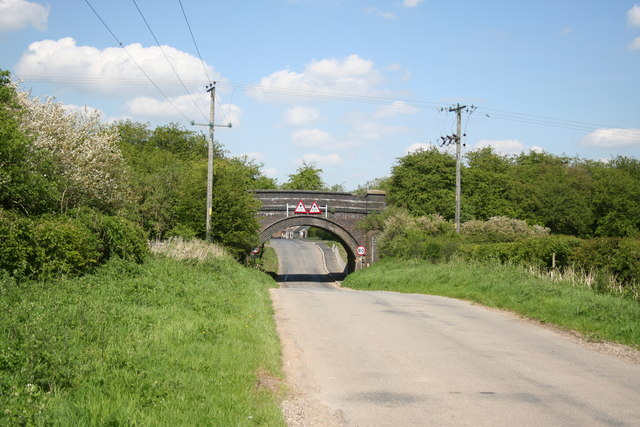
- Railway bridge, South Witham; The platform was on top of the embankment on the left

General information
- Location: England
- Grid reference: SK923189
- Platforms: 2

Other information
- Status: Disused

History
- Pre-grouping: Midland Railway

Key dates
- 1 May 1894: Opened
- 2 March 1959: Closed
Location

South Witham railway station was a station in South Witham, Lincolnshire on the Midland Railway. It was Midland Railway property but train services were operated by the Midland and Great Northern Joint Railway. It was closed in 1959 along with most of the M&GN.

The station consisted of wooden buildings and platforms on the embankment, with a goods yard to the north, which could hold 50 wagons. It was built by a Mr. C. Barnes of Melton Mowbray, similar in style to Edmondthorpe and Wymondham. The platforms had a length of 400 ft (122 m), the passing loop was 279 ft (85 m) long.

Preceding station	Disused railways	Following station
Edmondthorpe; Line and station closed	Midland and Great Northern Joint Railway	Castle Bytham; Line and station closed
