= Abbey of Saint-Médard de Soissons =

Abbey in Aisne, France

Coordinates: 49°22′59″N 3°20′37″E

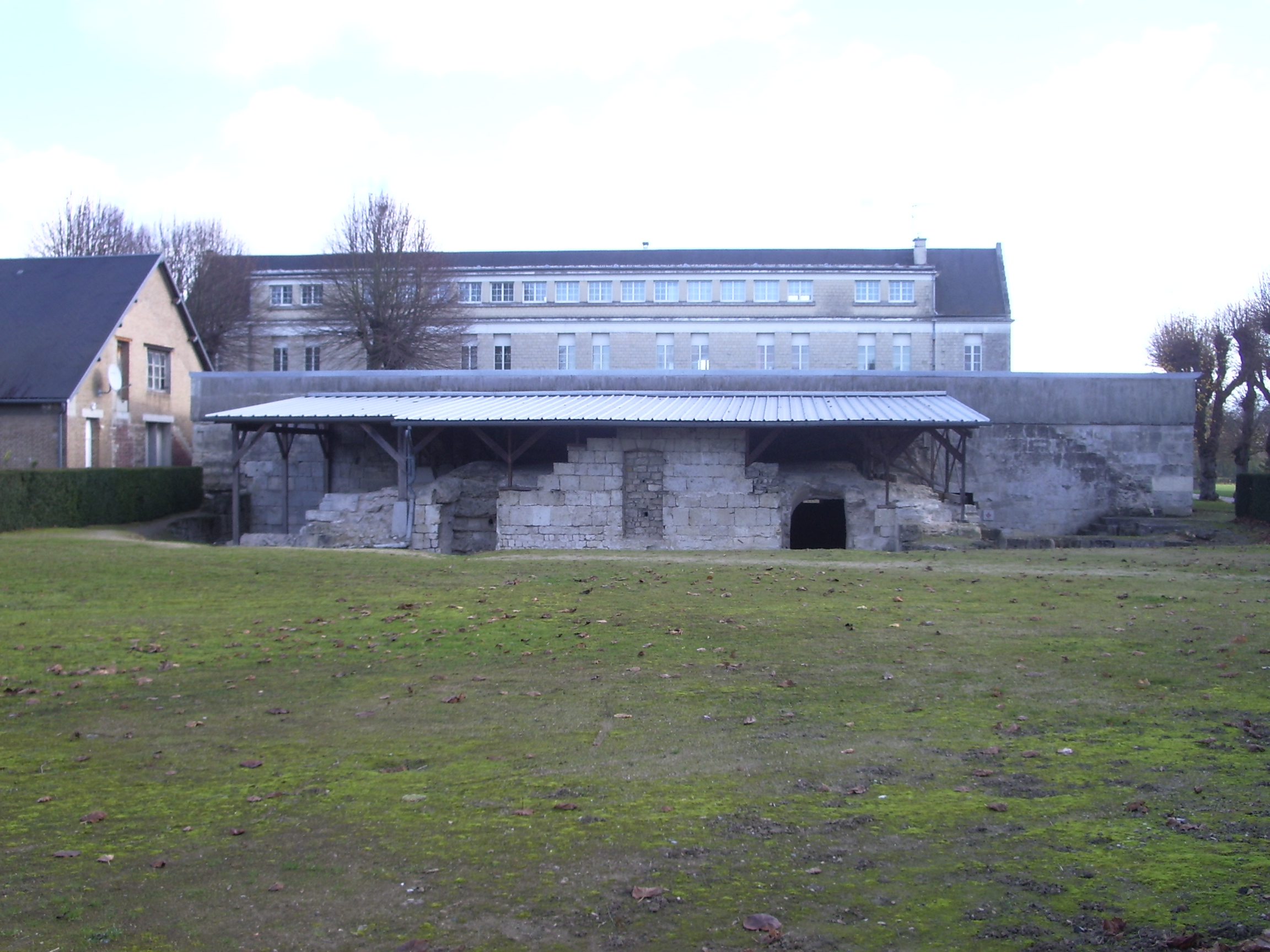
Abbey of Saint-Médard de Soissons

The Abbey of Saint-Médard de Soissons was a Benedictine monastery, at one time held to be the greatest in France.

== History ==
The abbey was founded in 557 by Clotaire I on his manor of Crouy, near the villa of Syagrius, just outside the then boundaries of Soissons to house the remains of Saint Medard, the legend being that during the funeral procession the bier came to a standstill at Crouy and was impossible to move until the king had made a gift of the whole estate for the foundation of the abbey.

Besides Saint Medard, kings Clotaire I and Sigebert I were also buried here. In 751 Childeric III was deposed here, and Pippin the Short crowned. Richard Gerberding, the modern editor of Liber Historiae Francorum places its anonymous author here, ca 727.

Hilduin, abbot from 822 to 830, obtained in 826 from Pope Eugene II relics of Saint Sebastian and Saint Gregory the Great, and also succeeded in obtaining the transfer to the abbey of the relics of Saint Gildard and Saint Remigius. He rebuilt the church, which was consecrated on 27 August 841, in the presence of Charles the Bald and seventy-two prelates; the king himself assisted in carrying the body of Saint Medard into the new church.

In 804, Pope Leo III stayed at Saint-Médard, having celebrated Christmas with Charlemagne at Quierzy. In 833 Louis the Pious was imprisoned and underwent a public penance here.

In 1121, after a council at Soissons where he was accused of heresy, Peter Abelard was, as punishment, confined to the convent of Saint Medard. In 1131 Pope Innocent II reconsecrated the rebuilt church and granted those visiting it indulgences known as "Saint Medard's pardons".

The wealth of the abbey was immense. In the 12th century the community owned about two hundred and twenty fiefs. The abbey also minted coins.

Its wealth remained into the 16th century but the abbey was destroyed in 1567 during the Wars of Religion, and although it was restored in 1637, it never regained its former stature. The abbey was dissolved in the French Revolution.

The buildings had disappeared by the beginning of the 20th century, except for the still extant but almost forgotten crypt of about 840.

== Abbots ==
The abbots of St. Medard's included:

- Saint Arnold of Soissons, who in 1081 became Bishop of Soissons;
- Saint Gerald of Sauve-Majeure, late 11th century;
- Cardinal de Bernis, commendatory abbot from 1756

== Burials ==
- Chlothar I
- Eadgifu of Wessex

== Sources ==
- Goyau, Pierre-Louis-Théophile-Georges (1912). "Soissons" . In Herbermann, Charles (ed.). Catholic Encyclopedia. Vol. 14. New York: Robert Appleton Company.
- Chisholm, Hugh, ed. (1911). "Soissons" . Encyclopædia Britannica. Vol. 25 (11th ed.). Cambridge University Press. p. 352.
