= Vaudey Abbey =

Former Cistercian abbey in England

Coordinates: 52°46′56″N 0°27′52″W

Vaudey Abbey, also known as Vandy Abbey or Vandey Abbey, was an English Cistercian abbey. It was founded in 1147 by William, Count of Aumale, Earl of York. Its site is within the Grimsthorpe Castle park, in Lincolnshire, 3.7 miles (6 km) northwest of Bourne on the A151, but there are no remains of the Abbey aside from earthworks.

The Victoria County History contains a substantial report and a list of abbots.

== Foundation ==
Vaudey Abbey was founded by monks from Fountains Abbey, who first settled at Bytham on 26 May 1147, near William’s Castle Bytham. However, they soon found the land unsuitable, and by 1149 one of William’s tenants, Geoffrey de Brachecourt, had given the monks new lands in nearby Grimsthorpe. This new site was named Latin: Vallis Dei (Valley of God), or "Vaudey" in the vernacular.

== Prosperity ==
During the 13th century, the house flourished with profits from wool, which by the late 13th century reached approximately £200 per year. In 1229, the abbot was sent in the king’s name to bear messages to Llewelyn, Prince of Wales, and in 1280 the abbot was empowered to arrest all vagabond Cistercian monks or lay-brothers, by the help of the secular arm, and to inflict appropriate punishment. However, by the end of the thirteenth century the abbey was experiencing financial difficulties and the number of monks had likely fallen.

Stephen of Sawley, abbot of Fountains, died in 1252 while conducting a visitation of Vaudey and was buried in the chapter house.

== Dissolution ==
The house was suppressed with the smaller monasteries in 1536. At Dissolution, the net annual income of the abbey was £124. By the mid-16th century, the abbey buildings were in ruins. In 1539, Henry VIII granted Charles Brandon, 1st Duke of Suffolk the lands of Vaudey Abbey, and he used its stone as building material for his new house. In 1736 William Stukeley noted that only the precinct wall remained intact.

On the other side of Grimsthorpe Park, Scottlethorpe had substantial stone remains used as part of a barn. This may be remains of an unrelated chapel known to have been located in the parish, or might have been re-located from Vaudey Abbey. The doorway was moved into Edenham church in 1967.
