= Grimsthorpe Castle =

Country house in Lincolnshire, England

Coordinates: 52.7923°N 0.4523°W

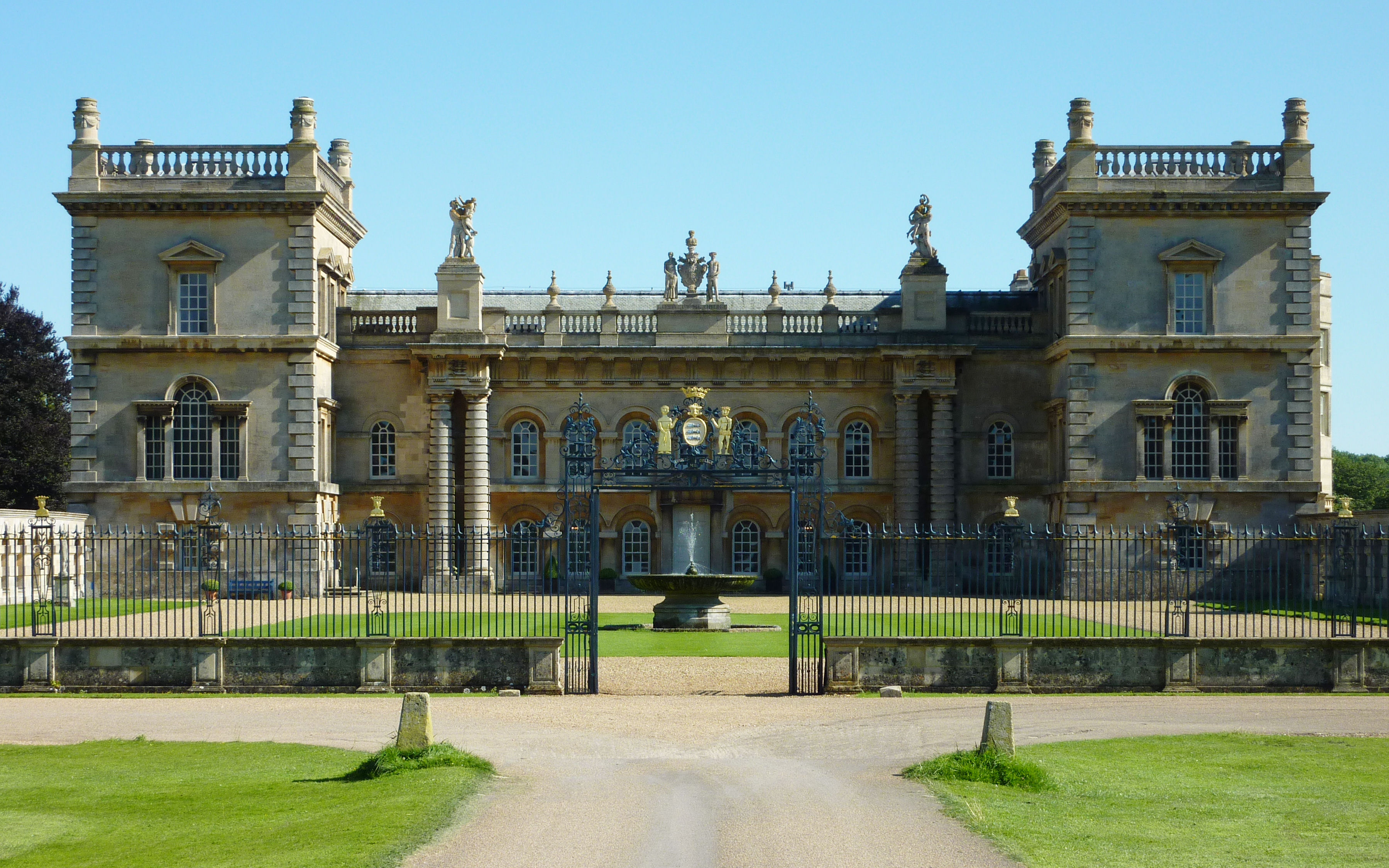
North Façade of Grimsthorpe Castle

Grimsthorpe Castle is a country house in Lincolnshire, England 4 miles (6.4 km) north-west of Bourne on the A151. It lies within a 3,000 acre (12 km^{2}) park of rolling pastures, lakes, and woodland landscaped by Capability Brown. While Grimsthorpe is not a castle in the strict sense of the word, its character is massive and martial – the towers and outlying pavilions recalling the bastions of a great fortress in classical dress. Grimsthorpe has been the home of the de Eresby family since 1516. The present occupant is Jane Heathcote-Drummond-Willoughby, 28th Baroness Willoughby de Eresby, granddaughter of Nancy Astor, who died at Grimsthorpe in 1964.

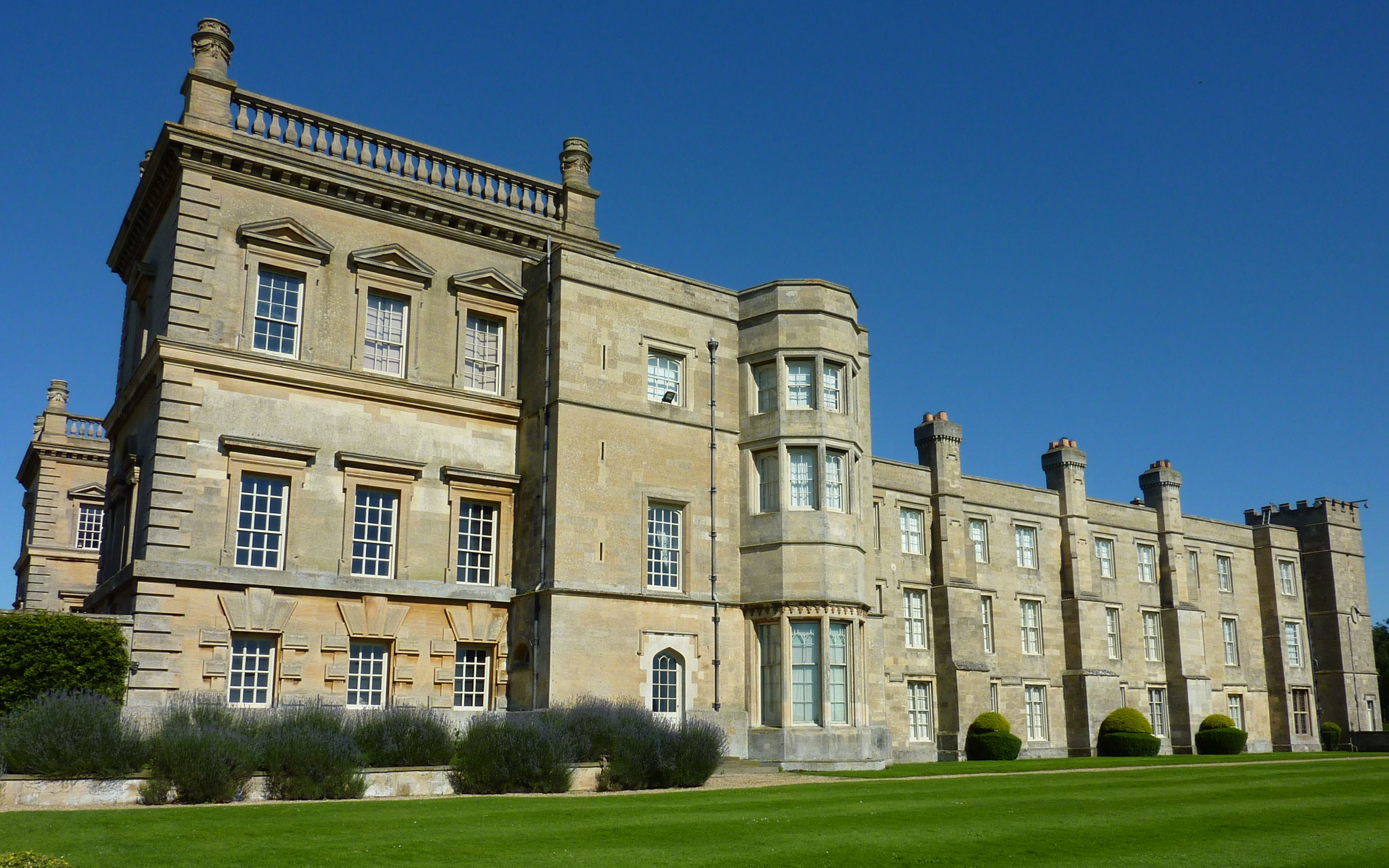
West Façade

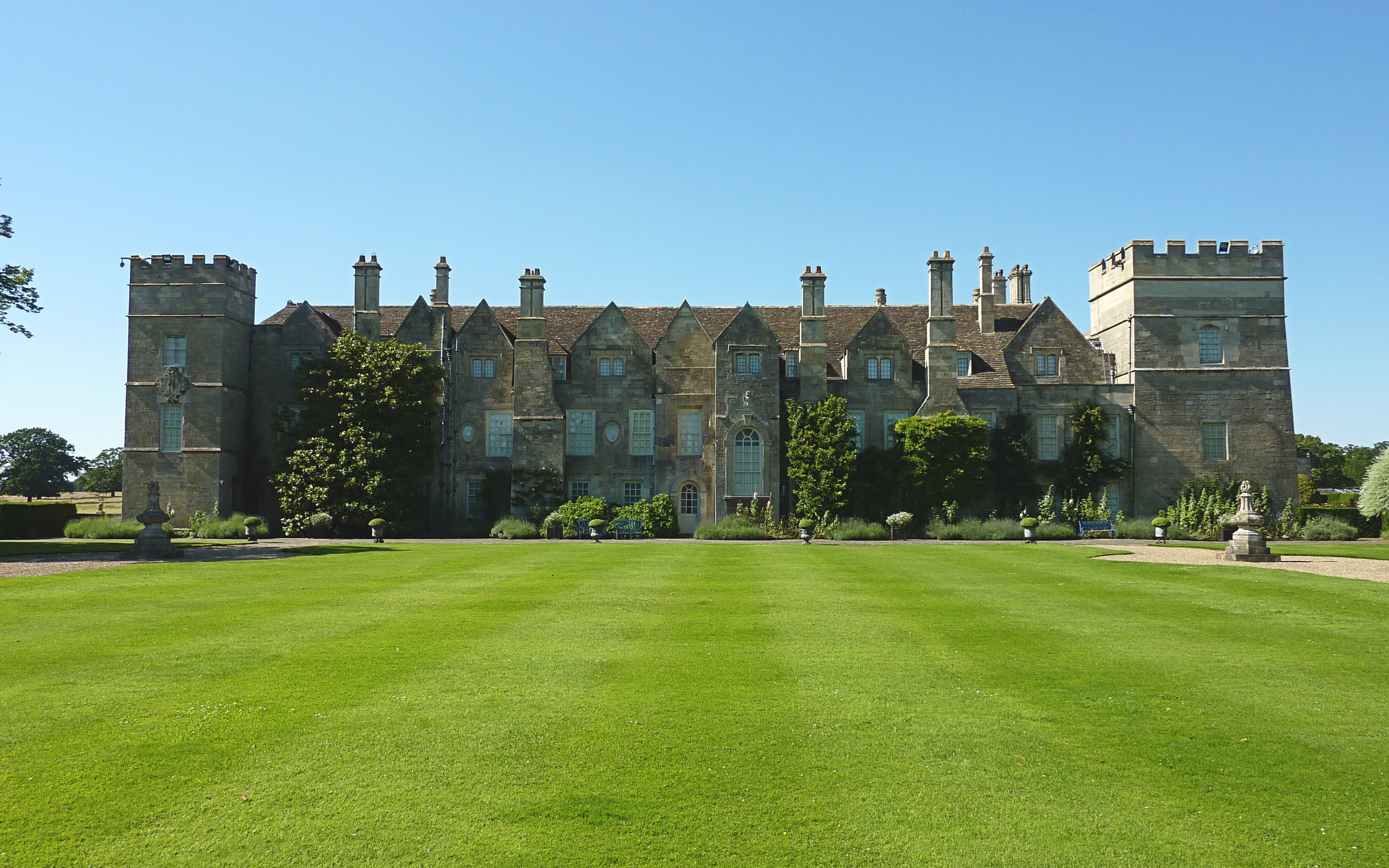
South Façade

== Origins ==
The building was originally a small castle on the crest of a ridge on the road inland from the Lincolnshire fen edge towards the Great North Road. It is said to have been begun by Gilbert de Gant, Earl of Lincoln in the early 13th century. However, he was the first and last in this creation of the Earldom of Lincoln and he died in 1156. Gilbert's heyday was the peak time of castle building in England, during the Anarchy. It is quite possible that the castle was built around 1140. However, the tower at the south-east corner of the present building is usually said to have been part of the original castle and it is known as King John's Tower. The naming of King John's tower seems to have led to a misattribution of the castle's origin to his time.

Gilbert de Gant spent much of his life in the power of the Earl of Chester and Grimsthorpe is likely to have fallen into his hands in 1156 when Gilbert died, though the title 'Earl of Lincoln' reverted to the crown. In the next creation of the earldom, in 1217, it was Ranulph de Blondeville, 4th Earl of Chester (1172–1232) who was ennobled with it. It seems that the title, if not the property was in the hands of King John during his reign; hence perhaps, the name of the tower.

During the last years of the Plantagenet kings of England, it was in the hands of Lord Lovell. He was a prominent supporter of Richard III. After Henry VII came to the throne, Lovell supported a rebellion to restore the earlier royal dynasty. The rebellion failed and Lovell's property was taken confiscated and given to a supporter of the Tudor Dynasty.

== The Tudor period ==
This grant by Henry VIII, Henry Tudor's son, to the 11th Baron Willoughby de Eresby was made in 1516, together with the hand in marriage of Maria de Salinas, a Spanish lady-in-waiting to Queen Catherine of Aragon. Their daughter Katherine inherited the title and estate on the death of her father in 1526, when she was aged just seven. In 1533, she became the fourth wife of Charles Brandon, 1st Duke of Suffolk, a close ally of Henry VIII. In 1539, Henry VIII granted Charles Suffolk the lands of the nearby suppressed Vaudey Abbey, founded in 1147, and he used its stone as building material for his new house. Suffolk set about extending and rebuilding his wife's house, and in only eighteen months it was ready for a visit in 1541 by King Henry, on his way to York to meet his nephew, James V of Scotland. In 1551, James's widow Mary of Guise also stayed at Grimsthorpe. The house stands on glacial till and it seems that the additions were hastily constructed. Substantial repairs were required later owing to the poor state of the foundations, but much of this Tudor house can still be seen today.

During Mary's reign the castle's owners, Katherine Brandon, Duchess of Suffolk (née Willoughby) and her second husband, Richard Bertie, were forced to leave it owing to their Anglican views. On Elizabeth's succeeding to the throne, they returned with their daughter, Susan, later Countess of Kent and their new son Peregrine, later the 13th Baron. He became a soldier and spent much of his time away from Grimsthorpe. Household accounts from this time have several references to theatrical performances for the family at Grimsthorpe and elsewhere, including a man on a hobby-horse in February 1561 and a puppet show in August 1561. Elizabeth I came to Grimsthorpe on 6 August 1566.

== The Vanbrugh building ==
By 1707, when Grimsthorpe was illustrated in Britannia Illustrata, the 15th Baron Willoughby de Eresby and 3rd Earl Lindsey had rebuilt the north front of Grimsthorpe in the classical style. However, in 1715, Robert Bertie, the 16th Baron Willoughby de Eresby, employed Sir John Vanbrugh to design a Baroque front to the house to celebrate his ennoblement as the first Duke of Ancaster and Kesteven. It is Vanbrugh's last masterpiece. He also prepared designs for the reconstruction of the other three ranges of the house, but they were not carried out. His proposed elevation for the south front was in the Palladian style, which was just coming into fashion, and is quite different from all of his built designs.

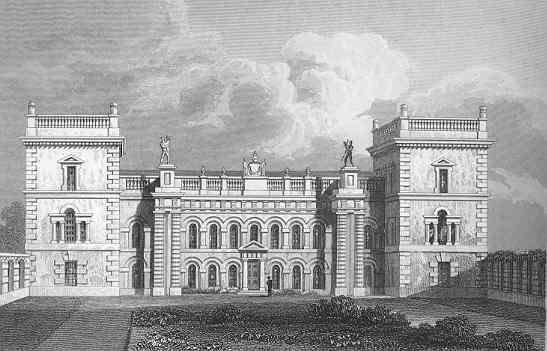
The North Front of Grimsthorpe as rebuilt by Vanbrugh, drawn in 1819. Vanbrugh's Stone Hall occupies the space between the columns on both floors.

Inside, the Vanbrugh hall is monumental with stone arcades all around at two levels. Arcaded screens at each end of the hall separate the hall from staircases, much like those at Audley End House and Castle Howard. The staircase is behind the hall screen and leads to the staterooms on the first floor. The State Dining Room occupies Vanbrugh's north-east tower, with its painted ceiling lit by a Venetian window. It contains the throne used by George IV at his Coronation Banquet, and a Regency giltwood throne and footstool used by Queen Victoria in the old House of Lords. There is also a walnut and parcel gilt chair and footstool made for the use of George III at Westminster. The King James and State Drawing Rooms have been redecorated over the centuries, and contain portraits by Reynolds and Van Dyck, European furniture, and yellow Soho Tapestries woven by Joshua Morris around 1730. The South Corridor contains thrones used by Prince Albert and Edward VII, as well as the desk on which Queen Victoria signed her coronation oath. A series of rooms follows in the Tudor east range, with recessed oriel windows and ornate ceilings. The Chinese drawing room has a splendidly rich ceiling and an 18th-century fan-vaulted oriel window. The walls are hung with Chinese wallpaper depicting birds amidst bamboo. The chapel is magnificent with superb 17th-century plasterwork.

== The park ==
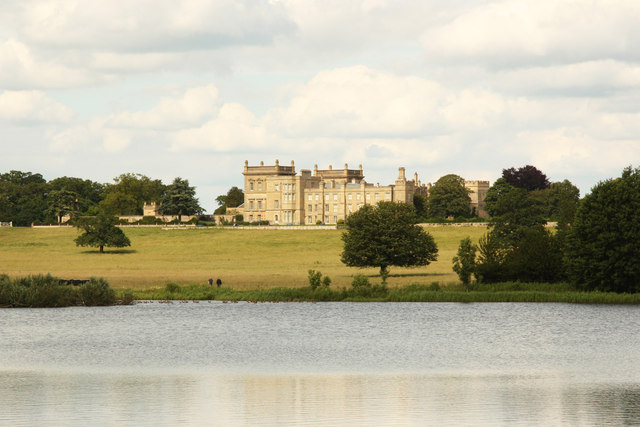
Grimsthorpe Castle, view from the park

The park was originally the southern edge of the great Lincolnshire forest, and its medieval deer park and Tudor oak park are crossed by fine avenues of trees. Oak trees which will have been among those recorded in the Domesday Book of 1086 were growing in the park when drawings of the park were made in the early 18th century. Some of these ancient trees were reportedly still alive in the 20th century. The present Grimsthorpe Castle park was designed by Lancelot "Capability" Brown (1771) and implemented by his patron, the 3rd Duke of Ancaster. The garden contains a knot garden, hedged rose gardens, a terrace with herbaceous and shrub borders, and a summerhouse designed by Vanbrugh. The formal flower and topiary garden leads imperceptibly into the woodland garden, and provides a fine setting for the ornamental vegetable garden and orchard, created in the 1960s by the Countess of Ancaster and Peter Coates. Intricate parterres marked with box hedges lie close to the Castle, and a dramatic herbaceous border frames views across the lake.

== Nineteenth century ==
The 1st Earl of Ancaster was very interested in technology, and attempted to improve the productivity of the estate in a number of ways. He organised an early demonstration of steam ploughing, built a private railway and used portable steam engines in the sawmill and for pumping.

== Twentieth century ==
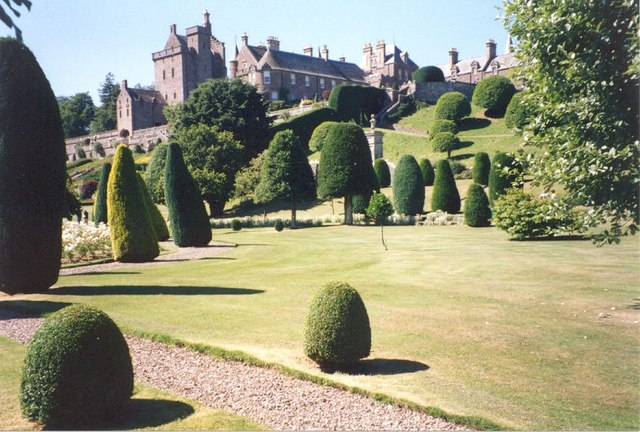
Gardens at Drummond Castle

During the First World War Grimsthorpe Park was used by the Royal Flying Corps and Royal Air Force as an emergency landing ground. During the Second World War the central part of the park, near the Vaudey Abbey site, was used as a bombing range. In 1944 the castle housed a company of the Parachute Regiment while it was recovering from operations in Italy and training for what became Operation Market Garden. Their flight for Arnhem began from RAF Folkingham.

Grimsthorpe and Drummond castles are now owned and managed by a trust.

== Twenty-first century ==
Since 2021, the Festival of the Unexceptional has been held at Grimsthorpe Castle.

== Art collection ==
A life-sized Francisco de Zurbarán portrait of Benjamin has hung at Grimsthorpe since the 18th century. It is the sole painting that has been separated from the Zurbarán series Jacob and his twelve sons which was painted in the 17th century and has been preserved at Auckland Castle in Bishop Auckland, County Durham. There is a copy of Benjamin at Bishop Auckland.
