= Sempringham Priory =

Monastery in Lincolnshire, England

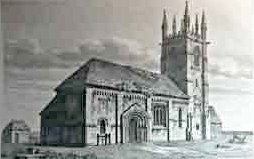
- Sempringham Parish Church

- Location within Lincolnshire

General information
- Location: Sempringham, Lincolnshire, England
- Coordinates: 52.8825371°N 0.3582196°W
- Completed: 1140s

Sempringham Priory was a priory in Lincolnshire, England, located in the medieval hamlet of Sempringham, to the northwest of Pointon. Today, all that remains of the priory is a marking on the ground where the walls stood and a square, which are identifiable only in aerial photos of the vicinity. However, the parish church of St Andrew's, built around 1100 AD, is witness to the priory standing alone in a field away from the main road.

The priory was built by Gilbert of Sempringham, the only English saint to have founded a monastic order. The priory's religious accentuation as an important religious pilgrimage site began when St Gilbert established the Gilbertine Order in 1131 by inducting "seven maidens" who were his pupils. Alexander, Bishop of Lincoln, helped in establishing the religious buildings to the north of St Andrew's Church as a protected area.

St Gilbert died at Sempringham in 1189 and was buried in the priory church. He was canonised on 13 October 1202, for the many miracles noted at his tomb in the priory. His name is prefixed to the Sempringham Priory, which is known as "St Gilbert Sempringham Priory," and is a centre of pilgrimage.

The priory, which functioned as a dual community made up of canons and nuns, was dissolved in 1538. The Clinton family, who took possession of the priory, demolished it completely without leaving any trace of it on the ground. They built a mansion from the building material they extracted from the demolished structure.

== Geography ==
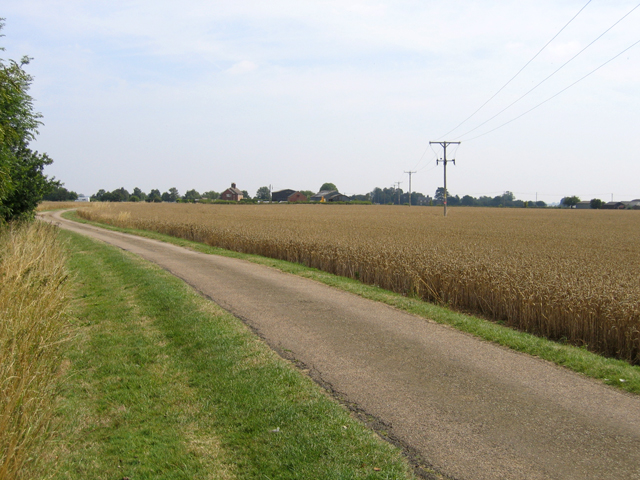
View of wheat fields along the lane from Sempringham Priory towards the B1177 Pointon Road

Sempringham Priory was spread over an area of 80 acres (0.32 km^{2}) of undulating topography located below the ruins of a major Tudor house skirting the Lincolnshire Fens, which is limestone country. The land of the priory was used for cultivation. It was not known as a former monastery until some archaeological excavations conducted in 1939 by the Heritage Trust of Lincolnshire revealed a layout of the buried presence of the medieval monastery and the housing complex surrounded by gardens. The priory measured 350 feet (110 m) lengthwise, and was inferred to have had within its space buildings for monks and nuns built around the 12th century. At the time of its demolition during the reign of Henry VIII, it was said to be the size of Westminster Abbey.

== History ==
=== 12th century ===
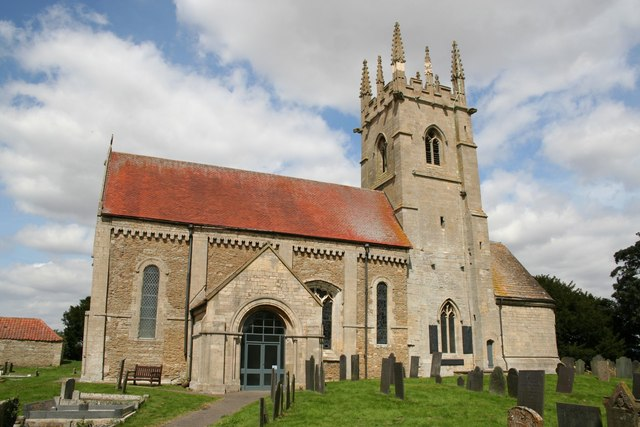
St Andrew's church, Sempringham

The Order of Sempringham originated in 1131. In or about that year, Gilbert of Sempringham left the household of Alexander, Bishop of Lincoln, and returned to serve the parish church of Sempringham, of which he was rector. He found there seven maidens, who had learned the way of holiness from him as children, and longed to live a strict religious life. Gilbert, having inherited lands and possessions in Sempringham from his father, resolved to give such wealth as he had for the use of those maidens.

With the help and advice of Alexander, he set up buildings and a cloister for them against the north wall of the church, which stood on his own land at Sempringham. He gave them a rule of life, enjoining upon them chastity, humility, obedience, and charity. Their daily necessities were passed to them through a window by some girls chosen by Gilbert from among his people. His friends warned him that his nuns ought not to speak with secular women, who by their gossip might rekindle in them an interest in the world which they had renounced. On the advice of William, Abbot of Rievaulx, he decided to yield to the request of the serving maids, who begged that they, too, might have a dress and rule of life. Soon afterwards, he took men as lay brothers to work on the land, giving them, too, a uniform and rules.

The little community grew in numbers, and amongst its earliest benefactors was Brian of Pointon. In 1139, Gilbert accepted three carucates of land in Sempringham from Gilbert of Ghent, his feudal lord. His first building had proved too small, and Sempringham Priory, with its double church, cloisters and buildings, was erected on the new site given by Gilbert of Ghent, not far from the parish church, and dedicated to the Virgin. Because of his gift, Gilbert of Ghent was held to be the founder.

In 1147, Gilbert went to the general chapter at Citeaux to ask the abbots to bear rule over his nuns, but they refused. However, at Citeaux, he met Bernard of Clairvaux, and Pope Eugene III, the latter of whom conferred on him the care of the order. Bernard invited him to Clairvaux, and helped him to draw up the Institutes of the Order of Sempringham, which were afterwards confirmed by Eugene III. Gilbert returned to England in 1148 and completed the order by appointing canons to serve his community as priests and to help him in administrative work.

Gilbert gave to the canons the Augustinian rule, and added many statutes from the customs of Augustinian and Premonstratensian canons. The chief officers were the prior, sub-prior, cellarer, precentor, and sacrist. In a double house, the number of canons varied from seven to 30, but at Sempringham they were increased to 40. The lay brothers followed the rule of the Cistercian lay brothers. The nuns of the order kept the rule of Saint Benedict, and followed in every way the customs of the canons.

Each house was under three prioresses who presided in the frater and visited the sick. The other officers were the sub-prioress, cellaress, subcellaress, sacrist, and precentrix. The lay sisters were bound to serve and obey the nuns. They cooked for the whole community under the supervision of a nun, who served for a week at a time. They also brewed ale, sewed, washed, made thread for the cobblers, and wove wool. All the clothes, except the shirts and breeches of the men, were cut out and made by the women.

The general administration of the property of the house was in the hands of a council of four proctors, consisting of the prior, cellarer, and two lay brothers. The expenditure was controlled by the nuns. The treasury was in their building, and the keepers were three mature and discreet nuns, who each had charge of a different key. Communications about business, food, and other matters were made at the window-house, which was constructed in such a way that the speakers could not see each other.

The supreme ruler of the order was the master, who, subject to good behaviour and health, was elected for life at a general chapter by representatives of nuns and canons from all the houses. The privilege of freedom of election was granted by Henry II, and confirmed in 1189 by Richard I. The custody of the order, its houses, granges, and churches, was legally vested in the priors during the vacancy, which, in fact, lasted only a few days. The master was not attached to any house, but continually went from one to the other on his visitation. He appointed the chief officers and admitted novices. According to the rule, his consent was necessary for all sales and purchases of lands, woods, and everything above the value of three marks, and his seal was affixed to all charters, but these provisions were later modified in practice. He had no benefices or other property set aside for the expenses of his visitations and other duties which might devolve on him. In the middle of the 13th century, the houses of the order were contributing to the communa magistri in proportion to their means, and in 1535, a fixed payment to the master "of ancient custom" is mentioned in the outgoings of each house. The general chapter met each year at Sempringham on the Rogation Days, and was attended by the prior, cellarer, and two prioresses from each house, the scrutators general, and the scrutators of the cloister.

While Gilbert was master, there were two serious crises in the history of Sempringham and the other houses of the order. Early in 1165, Gilbert and all the priors were summoned to Westminster to answer a charge of having sent money abroad to Thomas Becket, Archbishop of Canterbury, and of having helped him to escape from England, the penalty for which was exile. The accusation, however, was false, though Gilbert scrupled to swear to his innocence. Meanwhile, messengers arrived from Henry II to say that he would judge the case on his return from Normandy, and that Gilbert and his priors could go in peace.

In 1170, a rebellion took place among the lay brothers, who complained of the harshness of the rule, and insisted on more food and less work. Two of them went to Rome with ill-gotten gains and slandered Gilbert and the canons to Pope Alexander III, who intervened on their behalf. As Gilbert's cause was warmly espoused by Henry II and several of the bishops, the pope was convinced that he had been deceived. When the lay brothers found that they had failed to move Gilbert by violence, they asked for pardon and humbly entreated him to relax the rule for them. Accordingly, certain changes in their food and dress were solemnly made about 1187, in the presence of Hugh, Bishop of Lincoln, with the consent of the general chapter of Sempringham.

On 4 February 1189, Gilbert died at Sempringham, and was buried on the 7th in the presence of a large group of people. His tomb was placed between the altars of St Mary and St Andrew, in the priory church, and could be seen on either side of the wall which divided the men from the women. Many miracles of healing were reported to have been worked at the tomb in the next few years, and in 1200, Hubert Walter, Archbishop of Canterbury, set about obtaining his canonisation. After an inquisition into the truth of the alleged miracles, canonisation was decreed by Innocent III. The translation of St Gilbert took place on 13 October 1202, in the presence of many, an indulgence of 40 days to pilgrims to his shrine being granted by the archbishop of Canterbury, and 110 days by several other bishops.

The convent of Sempringham at first suffered poverty, but several benefactors had compassion on the nuns. In 1189, the possessions of the priory included the whole township of Sempringham, with the parish church and the chapel of Pointon, the granges of Kirkby, Marham, Cranwell, Fulbeck, Thorpe, Bramcote, Walcote, Thurstanton, the hermitage of Hoyland, a mill in Birthorpe, half a knight's fee in Laughton (Locton), the mills of Folkingham, and the churches of Billingborough, Stowe with the chapel of Birthorpe, Hanington, Aslackby, Buxton, Brunesthorp, Kirkby, Bradstow, and moieties of Trowell and Laughton. Probably in consideration of this endowment, Gilbert limited the number of nuns and lay sisters to 120, and canons and lay brothers to 60.

Grants of pasturage were numerous, and the chief source of revenue of the Gilbertines, as of the Cistercians, was their wool. In some houses, the wool was made into cloth, not only for the dress of the convent, but for sale. Cloth of Sempringham was noted in John's reign. In 1193, all the wool of the order of Sempringham for one year was taken for Richard I's ransom. The Gilbertines were tempted by their exemptions from all tolls and customs to act, like the Cistercians, as factors in the wool trade throughout the county; ecclesiastical and royal prohibitions alike failed to check them from disobeying their own rule. The jealousy of other traders stirred Henry III and Edward I to threaten correction in 1262 and 1302, but in 1342 and 1344, the same complaints reached Edward III, who also bade the Gilbertines desist utterly from such trading.

=== 13th century ===
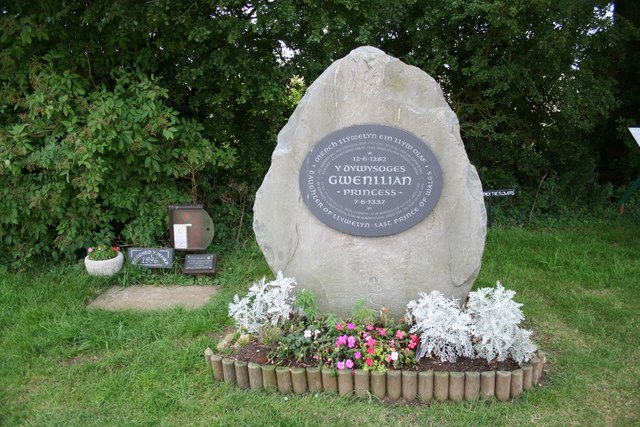
Commemorative plaque to Gwenllian of Wales who lived in Sempringham until her death in 1337

Despite increasing possessions, the convent was never wealthy. Though the standard of life seemed always to have been simple, the revenues were small for the number of inmates. The numbers fixed by St Gilbert represented no ideal complement, indeed the tendency was to exceed them, as at Sempringham, and the burden of maintaining so large a number of nuns is mentioned in more than one papal privilege.

In 1226, Henry III gave the master a present of 100 marks for their support. In 1228, he relieved the priory of the expense of providing food during the meeting of the general chapter at the motherhouse on the Rogation days by his gift of the church of Fordham, which was worth 55 marks a year. Ten years later, the revenues were materially increased. The Scottish house at Dalmulin on the north bank of the River Ayr, which was founded and endowed by Walter FitzAlan about 1221, was abandoned, and its possessions were transferred to the abbot and convent of Paisley Abbey in consideration of a yearly payment of 40 marks to Sempringham.

The parish churches of Sempringham, Birthorpe, Billingborough, and Kirkby were already appropriated. Yet in 1247, Pope Innocent IV granted to the master the right to appropriate the church of Horbling, because there were 200 women in the priory who often lacked the necessaries of life. The legal expenses of the order at the papal curia perhaps accounted for their poverty. The annual payment of 40 marks was felt as a grievous burden by Paisley Abbey, and seems to have been ignored in several years for, in 1246, the prior and convent of Sempringham appealed to Innocent IV to right them. They were obliged to pay the whole of the expenses of the suit and remit half the arrears of the debt on condition that Paisley should make regular payments from that time onwards.

In 1254, the spiritualities of Sempringham were assessed at £170, the temporalities at £196 9s. 1d. In 1253, the prior and convent obtained a grant of free warren in all their demesne lands, and in 1268, the right of holding a fair in the manor of Stow. The order was under the special protection of the papacy, and was exempt entirely from episcopal visitation. Accordingly, evidence of its internal history must be sought in papal bulls and registers. It would appear that on or before 1220, the general chapter petitioned that the sole power of making changes in the rule might be confirmed to them, and that the master and priors should not alter their liberties and constitutions. Complaints were also made of the extravagance of priors who travelled with servants and baggage horses, and used silver cups, and other pompous vessels.

In 1223, a visitation of the order was conducted by the abbot of Warden by order of the legate Otho. The injunctions of the abbot of Warden showed that there was a tendency to relax the rule in somewhat unimportant matters. He directed that the cowl of the nuns should not be cut too long, that fine furs should not be used for the cloaks of canons and nuns, that the canons' copes should be made minime curiose. Variety of pictures and superfluity of sculpture were forbidden. The rule of silence was to be more strictly observed. The proctors were bidden to provide the same food and drink for the nuns as for the canons, and not in future to buy beer for the canons when the nuns had only water to drink.

A very important papal visitation was undertaken when Ottoboni was legate in England from 1265 to 1268. He went to Sempringham in person, but delegated the duty of visiting other houses of the order to members of his household. In 1268, after a careful study of the reports of the visitors, a series of injunctions was drawn up by Ralph of Huntingdon, a Dominican chaplain in the service of the legate, with the aid of Richard, chief scrutator of the order. The democratic principles of the order had obviously been violated, and the master and heads of houses had shown arbitrary tendencies. It was necessary to insist that the master should strive to rule by love rather than fear, and to threaten priors and sub-priors who were stern to the verge of cruelty with deposition. The master was forbidden to receive men and women into the order without the advice of its members. The priors were warned against conducting business and manumitting servile lands and serfs without consulting their fellow proctors and seeking the consent of their chapters. The lucrative practice of collecting wool and selling it with the produce of their own flocks, was strictly, though in vain, forbidden.

It was ordered that discipline should be firmly maintained among the regular servants of the priory and granges, and servants and labourers were forbidden to go off the monastery lands without special leave. Lay brothers who were skilled in surgery might only practise their art by the prior's leave, and if the patients were men. A tendency to treat the nuns with less consideration than the rule required was sternly repressed. They were to have all their rights and privileges, and no plea of urgent business might avail to deprive them of their assent to all transactions. Pittances provided for the nuns were not to be assigned to other purposes for any reason, and money given on the admission of a nun was to be devoted to their needs. The master was to see that they were not stinted in clothes and food.

In 1291, the assessment of the temporalities had risen to £219 17s. 11½d. The property continued to increase, as several licences were obtained subsequently to appropriate numerous small grants of land in mortmain. The right of holding a fair in the manor of Wrightbald was conceded in 1293. At the beginning of the 14th century, the annual sales of wool amounted to 25 sacks a year and, whatever the net profits may have been, added largely to the income of the convent. It was doubtless on account of the important share of the order in the wool trade that Edward II asked in 1313 for a loan of 1,000 marks, and in 1315 for £2,000, for the assessment of all its spiritualities and temporalities scarcely exceeded £3,000.

=== 14th century ===
In 1303, the prior held in Lincolnshire half a knight's fee in Horbling, half in Irnham, half less 1/12 in Laughton and Aslackby, a quarter in Cranwell, a quarter in Bulby, one-fifth in Bulby and Southorpe, one-eighth in Fulbeck, one-eighth in Scredington, 1/16 in Osbournby, and 1/20 in Bitchfield. In 1346, he held also a knight's fee in Stragglethorpe, one-sixth in Walcote, and 1/32 in Aunsley, and in 1428 in Leicester one-quarter of a fee in Thrussington.

At the general chapter in 1304, it was decided, "on account of frequent and continuous royal and papal tenths, contributions and exactions," that in each house a grange, church, or fixed rent should be set aside to meet those demands. The Gilbertines had been exempted by Henry II from all gelds and taxes, (fn. 60) and John especially mentioned, in his charter of confirmation, the aids of the sheriffs, tallage, and scutage. However, in the reigns of Henry III and Edward I, the popes taxed both spiritualities and temporalities, and sometimes handed over the proceeds to the crown. In this way, the order lost its privileges, and afterwards voted grants with the rest of the clergy in convocation.

At this time, the interests of farming and trading did not predominate to the exclusion of all else. In 1290, Nicholas IV granted a licence to the prior and canons of Sempringham to have within their house a discreet and learned doctor of theology to teach those of their brethren who desired to study that science. For some years the master had sent certain canons of the order to study at Cambridge. In 1290, a house of residence was secured in the town, and contributions were afterwards levied from all the houses of the order for the support of canons as scholars.

Two years later, Robert Luttrell, rector of Irnham, gave a house and lands at Stamford that canons from Sempringham Priory might study divinity and philosophy at the university which was then flourishing in that town. In 1303, a canon named Robert Mannyng of Bourne began to write, in the cloister at Sempringham, his book called Handlyng Synne, which was an English version of Waddington's Manuel des Péchés ("Handbook of Sins"), a satire on the failings and vices of English men and women of all classes of society. He had then lived 15 years in the monastery, and had previously studied at Cambridge. The annals of the house were recorded in French from 1290 to 1326.

In 1301, Prior John de Hamilton began to build a new church for the priory, as the earlier one had fallen into disrepair. Ten years before, Nicholas IV had granted lavish indulgences to penitents who visited the priory church and chapels of St John, St Stephen, and St Catherine, so the proceeds from their offerings were available. The rebuilding of other parts of the monastery was also in contemplation, for in 1306, the prior and convent obtained a papal bull enabling them to appropriate the churches of Thurstanton and Norton Disney for that purpose. However, the church was still unfinished in 1342, when Bishop Thomas Bek granted an indulgence for the fabric, "which had been begun anew at great cost." There were a number of reasons for the delay. The price of corn was very high in the years of famine from 1315 to 1321. Owing to the Scottish wars the payment of 40 marks from the abbey of Paisley ceased altogether, probably before 1305, and it was not until 1319 that the prior and convent were able by way of compensation for their loss to appropriate the church of Whissendine, worth 55 marks, for the expenses of clothing 40 canons and 200 women.

Probably by reason of its position as the head house of a purely English order, Sempringham was in high favour with the three Edwards, who sent there wives and daughters of their chief enemies. Gwenllian, the daughter of Llywelyn ap Gruffudd, the last Welsh-born Prince of Wales, was sent to Sempringham as a little child, after her father's death in 1283, and died a nun of the house 54 years later. Edward I allowed the acquisition of certain lands in mortmain because he had charged the priory with her maintenance, and in 1327 Edward III granted £20 a year for her life. In 1322, by order of the Parliament at York, Margaret de Clare, Countess of Cornwall, was sent to live at Sempringham among the nuns. In 1324 Joan, daughter of Roger Mortimer, was received at the priory. Two daughters of the elder Hugh Despenser were also sent to take the veil at Sempringham, and in 1337 an allowance of £20 a year was made for their lives.

The unsettled state of the country in the reign of Edward II and the earlier years of Edward III was very unfavourable to many monasteries. In 1312, Sempringham Priory was attacked by Roger de Birthorpe, Geoffrey Luttrell of Irnham (famous for commissioning the Luttrell Psalter), Edmund of Colville, and other knights. They broke into the monastery, assaulted the canons and their men and servants, and carried away their goods. However, Prior John and some of his canons and servants raided the park at Birthorpe to recover their animals which had been impounded. A petition to the Crown by Roger de Birthorpe, dated about 1327, suggests that these two episodes were part of a wider conflict, in which there may have been faults on both sides.

In 1330, the priors of Sempringham and Haverholme, accompanied by several of their canons and other persons, were charged by William of Querington and Brian of Herdeby with raiding a close at Evedon, cutting down the trees, carrying away timber, and depasturing and destroying corn with plough cattle. The next year the prior lodged a complaint against Brian of Herdeby and others who had assaulted a canon and a lay brother at Evedon, consumed his crops and grass at Burton, hunted in his free warren there, and carried off hares and partridges.

In 1320, the priory was in money difficulties and owed £1,000 to Geoffrey of Bramton, a clerk. Speculations in wool with Italian merchants followed. Inability to pay the king's taxes marked a financial crisis in 1337, and again in 1345. Consequent probably upon the poverty of the house, the Master of Sempringham in 1341 obtained exemption from future attendance at Parliament. He had been regularly summoned from the great Parliament of 1295, until 1332, but, as in the case of other abbots and priors, attendance was doubtless found to be a great burden and expense.

No record remains of the ravages of the Black Death at Sempringham or any other house of the Gilbertine Order, although there is some evidence of distress in the priory in 1349. On the eve of Trinity Sunday in that year, there was a great storm and flood. The water in the church rose as high as the capitals of the pillars, and in the cloister and other buildings it was six feet deep. Many of the books were destroyed and 18 sacks of wool were damaged. On 9 November, the king granted a license to the nuns to appropriate Hacconby church, which was valued at 24 marks a year, for their clothing. There is little doubt that none of the Gilbertine houses ever recovered from the effects of the Black Death. They were constrained to abandon almost entirely the cultivation of their own lands, and to let their numerous granges on leases.

In 1399, Boniface IX gave permission to the master, priors, canons, lay brothers, nuns and sisters of the order of Sempringham to farm, to fit laymen or clerks for a fixed time, their manors, churches, chapels, pensions, stipends and possessions, without requiring the licence of the ordinary. Thus, they lost their profits from the wool trade, which had probably exceeded their revenues from all other sources. The sheep everywhere died in thousands from the pestilence, and it was in fact impossible for the Gilbertines to carry on their former occupations of farming and trading with any success.

There are indications of a decline in discipline and morals, as well as in numbers. In 1363, the master, Robert of Navenby, was seeking to obtain from Urban V the rights of a mitred abbot that he might himself give benediction to his nuns. The bishop of Lincoln, however, protested. In 1366, many nuns of Sempringham had not received benediction, and as the master, William of Prestwold, refused to listen to the prioress, they petitioned Bishop John Bokyngham, who came to Sempringham, to right them. The number of nuns had then fallen to 67.

In 1382, Richard II granted a licence for the master and priors of the order to seize and detain all vagabond canons and lay brothers and, in 1383 and 1390, mandates were issued to the sheriffs and others to arrest an apostate canon. In 1397, Boniface IX sent a mandate to the archbishops of Canterbury and York and the bishop of Ely, to investigate the charges against William of Beverley, who was elected master in 1393. It was reported that on his visitation, he took immoderate procurations, burdened the houses by the excessive number of the members of his household and of his horses, and committed many grievances and enormities against the statutes of the order. The bishops were to punish him if guilty, to visit the houses, correct and reform what was amiss, to revise the statutes of the order, and frame others if expedient.

In 1405, the pope issued another mandate, stating that William of Beverley, master of the order, had dilapidated diverse goods, movable and immovable, had enormously damaged it, reduced it to great poverty, and continued in the same course. If found guilty he was to be deprived. However, whether the order obtained any redress is not known. The next master was not elected until 1407.

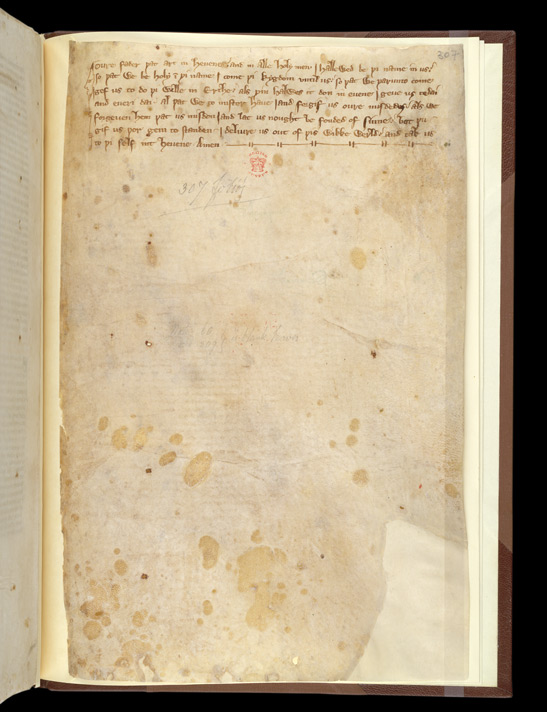
Last leaf of a 14th-century manuscript which was owned by the Gilbertine priory at Sempringham.

A 14th-century flyleaf inscription of an ancient manuscript of a pre-Wycliffe version of the Lord's Prayer in Middle English credited to Augustine of Hippo (354–430), Alexander Neckam (1157–1217), and others was a collection which was in the possession of Gilbertine Priory at Sempringham. The last leaf of this volume of the book has the Lord's Prayer which reads:

Our Father that art in heavens and in all holy men

Hallowed by thy name in us so that we be holy in thy name
. . .

Deliver us out of this wicked world and take us to thy self in heaven. Amen.

The fake religious Order of Brothelyngham, which rampaged through Exeter in 1348 kidnapping people and extorting money from them probably named itself thus as a satirical nod towards Sempringham, which at the time was also known humorously as Simplingham.

=== 15th century ===
The history of Sempringham Priory in the 15th century is very obscure. In 1400, a papal indulgence was granted for the repair of the priory church and, in 1409, a legacy was left for the fabric of the bell tower. In 1445, Henry VI granted to Nicholas Resby, master of the order, that the houses of Sempringham, Haverholme, Catley, Bullington, Sixhills, North Ormsby, and Alvingham should be free and exempt from all aids, subsidies, and tallages, and should never contribute to any payments of tenths or fifteenths made by the whole body of the clergy or of the provinces of Canterbury and York separately. However, the prior and convent of Sempringham were compelled to pay £40 in 1522 as their share of a grant from the spirituality towards Henry VIII's personal expenses in France for the recovery of that crown. With the abandonment of farming, except on the immediate demesne, the need of the order for lay brothers disappeared. They probably died out altogether early in the 15th century, and there is no record of any at the Dissolution of the Monasteries. Servants, too, probably very largely took the place of the lay sisters.

=== 16th century ===
At a general chapter held at St Catherine's, Lincoln, in 1501, it was resolved that the number of canons, which "in those days was less than usual," should be increased. The priors were to seek suitable persons, that with greater numbers religion might prosper. This attempt at revival was to some extent successful, for in several houses, as at Sempringham itself, the number of canons fixed at this chapter was reached before the dissolution. In all the houses of the order there were, in 1538, only 143 canons, 139 nuns, and 15 lay sisters. Nothing was alleged by the crown visitors against the Gilbertines in Lincolnshire, and they appear to have been living blameless lives, neither in poverty nor in wealth.

Robert Holgate, chaplain to Cromwell, who became master of the order in 1536, exerted his influence to prevent the surrender of the Gilbertine houses under the Act for the Suppression of the Smaller Monasteries in 1536, for only four out of 26 houses had revenues over £200 a year. No resistance was offered in 1538, when Dr William Petre came down to take the surrenders. On 18 September, Robert the master, Roger the prior, and 16 canons surrendered Sempringham Priory. The prior received Fordham rectory and £30 a year, the canons and prioresses and 16 nuns were also pensioned.

In 1535, the clear yearly value of the house was £317 4s. 1d. Of this sum £128 16s. 7d. was drawn from the rectories of Sempringham with the chapel of Pointon, Stow with the chapel of Birthorpe, Billingborough, Horbling, Walcote, Loughton, Cranwell, Norton Disney, Kirkby, Laythorpe, and Hacconby, in Lincolnshire; Whissendine in Rutland; Fordham in Cambridgeshire; Thurstanton in Leicestershire; and Buxton in Norfolk. The remainder of the property included granges or lands and tenements at Sempringham, Threckingham, Stow, Pointon, Dowsby, Ringesdon Dyke, Billingborough, Horbling, Walcote, Newton, Pickworth, Osburnby, Kysby, Folkingham, Aslackby, Woodgrange, Kirkby, Bulby, Morton, Wrightbald, Brothertoft, Wilton, Kirton Holme, Wrangle, Cranwell, Stragglethorpe, Carlton and Fulbeck, and a few other places in Lincolnshire; Ketton and Cottesmore in Rutland; Pickwell, Thurstanton and Willoughby in Leicestershire; Bramcote, Trowell, and Chinwell in Nottinghamshire; and Walton in Derbyshire. Six granges appear to have been farmed by bailiffs for the monastery and the rest were let on lease. The demesnes of Sempringham were worth £26 13s. 4d. a year. In the hands of the crown bailiff four years later, the property brought in £383 5s. 5d.

== Burials ==
- Gwenllian of Wales
- Saint Gilbert of Sempringham
- Henry Beaumont, 3rd Baron Beaumont (son of Eleanor of Lancaster)
- John Beaumont, 4th Baron Beaumont (1361–1396)
- Henry Beaumont, 5th Baron Beaumont (d.1413)

== Archaeological studies ==
Archaeological excavations have been carried out at the site using ground-penetrating radar, a non-destructive geophysical tool to locate buried objects. The investigations carried out in the priory area, at 5 metres (16 ft) grid has revealed not only artefacts of the priory, but also 47,000 objects dated prehistoric to post medieval periods. The survey has enabled identification of the outline of the building, including the gatehouse. The foundation walls are reportedly in good condition.

== See also ==
- List of English abbeys, priories and friaries serving as parish churches
