= Roger de Birthorpe =

Roger de Birthorpe (c.1280–c.1345) was an English landowner and lawyer who had a distinguished career in Ireland as a judge, becoming Chief Baron of the Irish Exchequer in 1327. His career however was marked by violence and controversy: he fled to Ireland after being imprisoned for trespass after a raid on Sempringham Priory, although he was later pardoned for his part in the raid. He was a friend and neighbour of Sir Geoffrey Luttrell of Irnham, who commissioned the Luttrell Psalter.

== Family ==
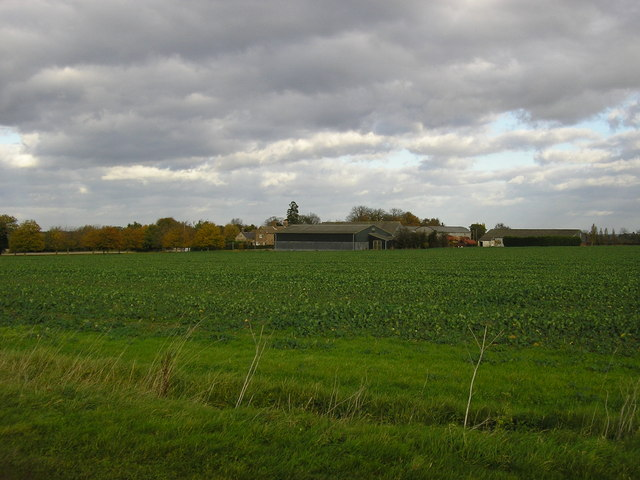
Birthorpe, present day

He was born at Birthorpe in Lincolnshire, the eldest son of John de Birthorpe, Lord of the Manor of Birthorpe. The family had held Birthorpe for several generations. He was occasionally called de Werthorpe. He qualified as a lawyer and is known to have acted as his father's attorney. He succeeded to the family estates before 1312. He has been described as a "forceful and dextrous" speaker, but, like many medieval landowners, he was quite capable of resorting to violence to achieve his ends. His wife was named Joan: they appear to have been childless.

== The raid on Sempringham Priory and its consequences ==
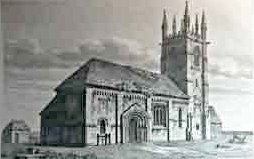
Sempringham Priory

In 1312 the neighbourhood of Birthorpe was plagued by a series of raids and counter-raids, involving John de Camelton, the Prior of Sempringham (the priory was about a mile from Birthorpe) on the one hand, and Roger and his brothers, assisted by Sir Geoffrey Luttrell, Edmund Colville, Guy Goband of Rippingale, and other neighbours, on the other. In July 1312 the Prior made a formal complaint to the Crown that Roger and his associates had invaded the priory, broken down its doors, carried off goods to the value of £500 and assaulted several of the monks. A commission of oyer and terminer was set up to investigate the complaint, and in due course, it found Roger guilty of trespass: he was fined 500 marks (£333), a sum which Roger, whose income was about £40 a year, could not possibly pay. Presumably because he defaulted on the payment, he was imprisoned in Lincoln Castle, from which he escaped. His estate at Birthorpe was forfeited to the Crown, and regranted to Henry de Beaumont. Roger fled to Ireland and was outlawed. A second commission, set up to investigate Roger's counter-claim that the Prior had unlawfully seized some of his cattle, was abandoned almost at once.

=== Roger's defence ===
According to Roger's later petition, he was the innocent party in the conflict, although he admitted to having impounded some cattle belonging to the Prior. By his account he and his companions "the great Lords and good people of the country", fully intended to reach "a good accord" with the Prior, who however would not receive them; and then "conceiving a malicious plan, he had the doors cut down by the men of his household", and raised the hue and cry against Roger. Roger pleaded that the Prior's false accusation had led to his wrongful conviction, and that "for the great malice of the said Prior, Roger dared not remain in England but crossed into Ireland", and subsequently the Prior put so much pressure on the authorities that Roger was declared an outlaw. Roger accordingly pleaded for the restitution of his lands. The endorsement on the petition gives the somewhat unhelpful answer that he "should sue for his remedy at common law".

== In Ireland ==
While Roger may well have been minimizing his own part in the Sempringham raid, his account of subsequent events is probably truthful enough. He arrived in Ireland in 1313, very likely to seek the assistance of relatives of Geoffrey Luttrell: the Luttrell family had acquired great influence there since the 1220s (Robert Luttrell was Lord Chancellor of Ireland 1238-1245). He also acquired powerful patrons in the FitzGerald family, headed by John FitzGerald, 1st Earl of Kildare. In 1316, Kildare and other "magnates of Ireland" procured a royal pardon for him, and thereafter his rise to power was rapid. In 1318 he became a justice in the court of the Justiciar of Ireland, and subsequently, a justice of the Court of Common Pleas (Ireland), with a salary of 40 marks a year. He also acted as justice itinerant for County Meath, and subsequently senior justice itinerant for the whole kingdom of Ireland. In 1327, the same year he petitioned the King for the restitution of his lands, he became Chief Baron of the Irish Exchequer.

== Last years ==
His plea for the restitution of his property was not successful in the short run, but he returned to Lincolnshire about 1330. He seems to have been restored to royal favour, and he sat on at least two commissions of oyer and terminer. It seems clear that he had regained possession of Birthorpe by 1340: it appears from the later testimony of William Dreyncourt that after the death of Henry de Beaumont in 1340 his son John, Baron Beaumont (died 1342) failed to establish his title to Birthorpe.

Roger's return to Birthorpe was short-lived, as in 1343 William Dreyncourt pleaded in a petition to the King that he had acquired Birthorpe from Roger and his wife Joan on an unspecified date. As far as we can determine Roger was still alive in 1343.
