= Crest (heraldry) =

Top component of an heraldic display

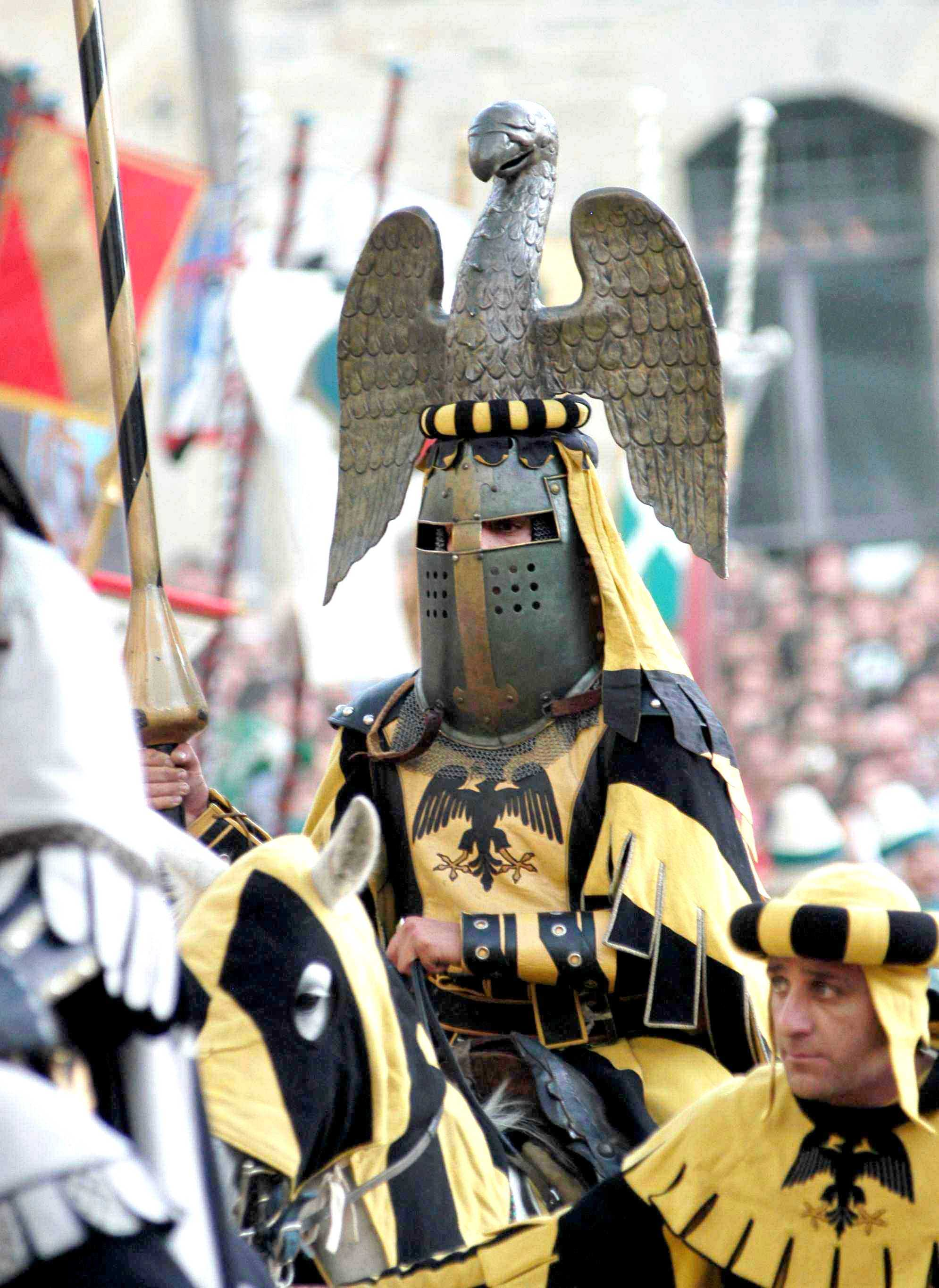
A knight with an eagle crest at the Saracen Joust in Arezzo, Tuscany

A crest is a component of a heraldic display, consisting of the device borne on top of the helm. Originating in the decorative sculptures worn by knights in tournaments and, to a lesser extent, battles, crests became solely pictorial after the 16th century (the era referred to by heraldists as that of "paper heraldry").

A normal heraldic achievement consists of the shield, above which is set the helm, on which sits the crest, its base encircled by a circlet of twisted cloth known as a torse. The use of the crest and torse independently from the rest of the achievement, a practice which became common in the era of paper heraldry, has led the term "crest" to be frequently but erroneously used to refer to the arms displayed on the shield, or to the achievement as a whole.

== Origin ==
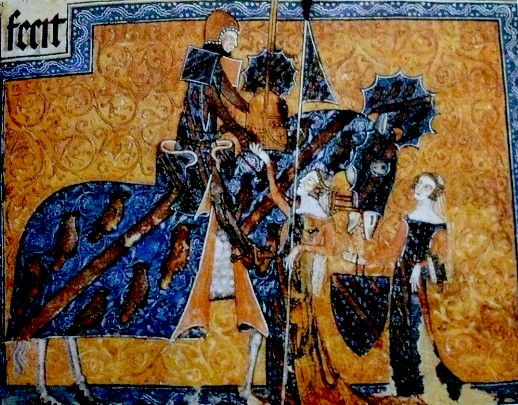
Sir Geoffrey Luttrell, with fan crests displaying his arms on both his helmet and his horse's head. From the Luttrell Psalter, c. 1330.

The word "crest" derives from the Latin crista, meaning "tuft" or "plume", perhaps related to crinis, "hair". Crests had existed in various forms since ancient times: Roman officers wore fans of feathers or horsehair, which were placed longitudinally or transversely depending on the wearer's rank, and Viking helmets were often adorned with wings and animal heads. They first appeared in a heraldic context in the form of the metal fans worn by knights in the 12th and 13th centuries. These were primarily decorative, but may also have served a practical purpose by lessening or deflecting the blows of opponents' weapons (perhaps why their edges came to be serrated). These fans were generally of one colour, later evolving to repeat all or part of the arms displayed on the shield.

The fan crest was later developed by cutting out the figure displayed on it, to form a metal outline; this evolved in the late 13th and early 14th centuries into a three-dimensional sculpture. These were usually made of cloth, leather or paper over a wooden or wire framework, and were typically in the form of an animal; also popular were wings, horns, human figures, and panaches of feathers. These were probably worn only in tournaments, not battle: not only did they add to the already considerable weight of the helm, they could also have been used by opponents as a handle to pull the wearer's head down.

Laces, straps, or rivets were used to affix the crest to the helm, with the join being covered by a circlet of twisted cloth known as a torse or wreath, or by a coronet in the case of high-ranking nobles. Torses did not come into regular use in Britain until the 15th century, and are still uncommon on the Continent, where crests are usually depicted as continuing into the mantling. Crests were also sometimes mounted on a furred cap known as a chapeau, as in the royal crest of England.

== Later development ==
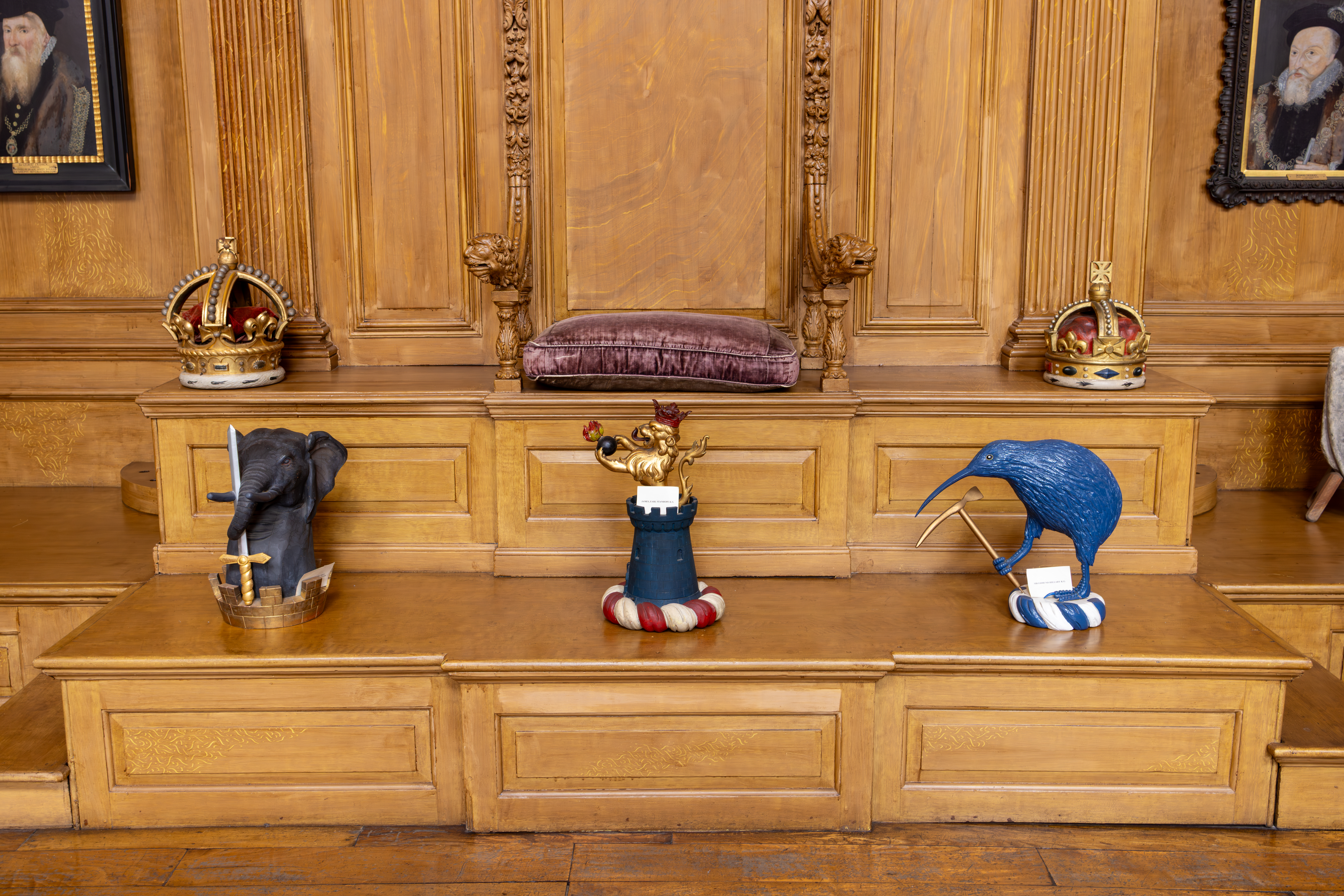
Crests of (from left to right) Herbert Kitchener; James Stanhope, 7th Earl Stanhope; and Edmund Hillary at the College of Arms, London

By the 16th century, the age of tournaments had ended, and physical crests largely disappeared. Their illustrated equivalents consequently began to be treated as simply two-dimensional pictures. Many crests from this period are physically impossible to bear on a helm, e.g. the crest granted to Sir Francis Drake in 1581, which consisted of a disembodied hand issuing from clouds and leading a ship around the globe (representing God's guidance).

In the same period, different helms began to be used for different ranks: sovereigns' and knights' helms faced forwards (affronté), whereas those of peers and gentlemen faced to the right (dexter). In the medieval period crests would always have faced the same way as the helm, but as a result of these rules, the directions of the crest and the helm might be at variance: a knight whose crest was a lion statant, would have the lion depicted as looking over the side of the helm, rather than towards the viewer. Torses also suffered artistically, being treated not as silken circlets, but as horizontal bars.

Heraldry in general underwent something of a renaissance in the late 19th and early 20th centuries, and many of the illogicalities of previous centuries were discarded. Crests are now generally not granted unless they could actually be used on a physical helm, and the rules about directions of helms are no longer rigidly observed.

== Usage ==
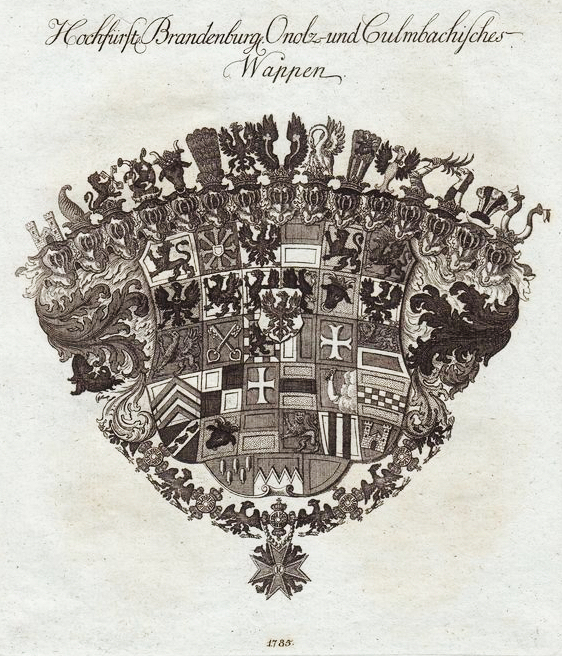
Arms of the Margrave of Brandenburg-Ansbach, with fifteen crested helms

The use of crests was once restricted to those of 'tournament rank', i.e. knights and above, but in modern times nearly all personal arms include crests. They are not generally used by women (with the exception of reigning queens) and clergymen, as they did not participate in war or tournaments and thus would not have helms on which to wear them. Some heraldists are also of the opinion that crests, as personal devices, are not suited for use by corporate bodies, but this is not widely observed.

In continental Europe, particularly Germany, crests have a far greater significance than in Britain, and it is common for one person to display multiple crests with his arms; certain high-ranking noblemen are entitled to as many as seventeen. This practice did not exist in Britain until the modern era, and arms with more than one crest are still rare. In contrast to Continental practice, where a crest is never detached from its helm, a Briton with more than one crest may choose to display only one crested helm, and have the other crests simply floating in space. Though usually adopted through marriage to an heiress, examples exist of secondary crests being granted as augmentations: after defeating the Americans at the Battle of Bladensburg, Robert Ross was granted, in addition to his original crest, the crest of an arm holding the US flag with a broken flagstaff.

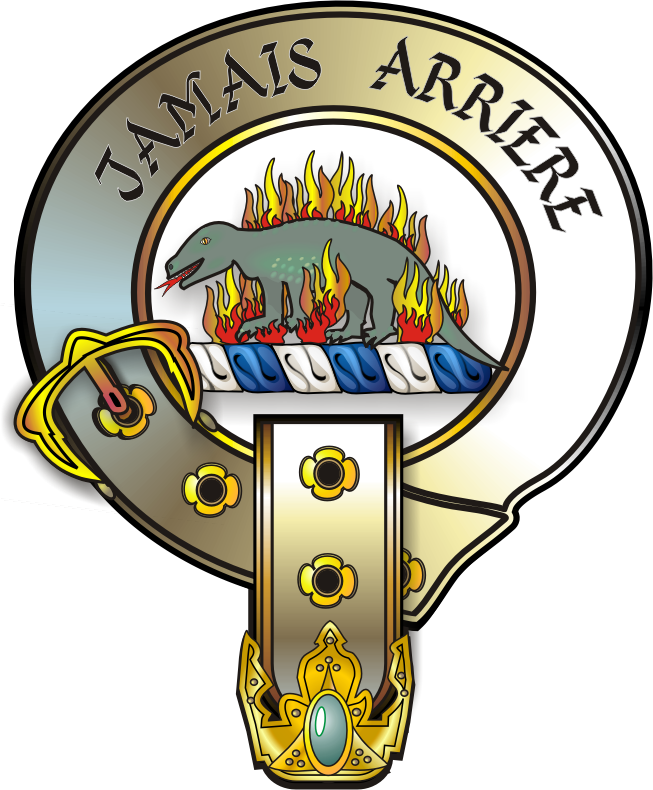
Crest badge of the chief of Clan Douglas

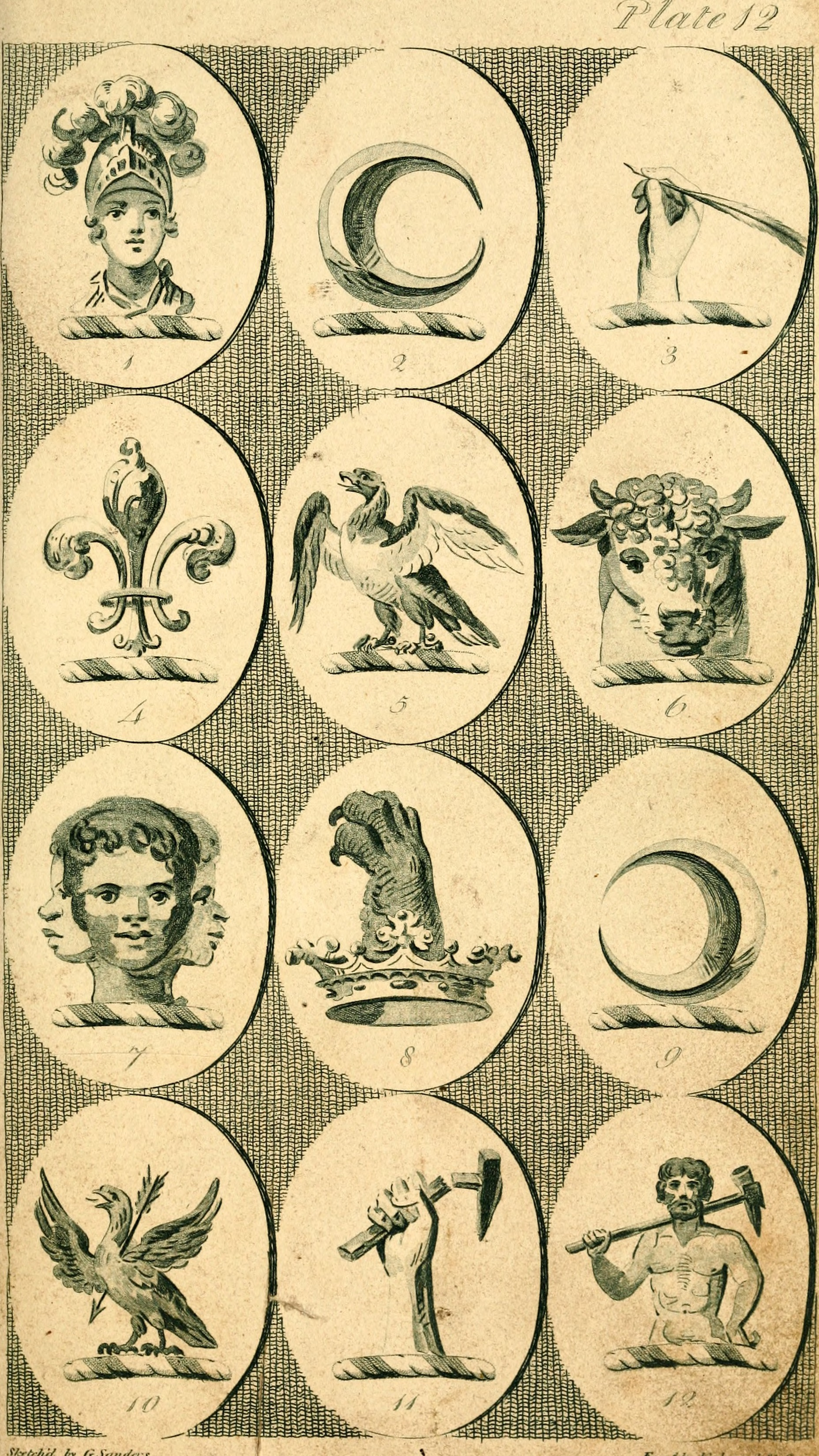
British crests in an 1817 book

After the 16th century, it became common for armigers to detach the crest and wreath from the helm, and use them in the manner of a badge, displayed on crockery, carriage doors, stationery, etc. This led to the erroneous use of the term "crest" to mean "arms", which has become widespread in recent years. In Scotland, a member of a clan or house is entitled to use a prescribed form of crest badge, which consists of the chief's crest encircled by a strap and buckle inscribed with the chiefly motto. Unlike such a badge, which can be used by any number of relatives and retainers, the crest itself is personal to the armiger, and its use by others is considered usurpation.

It is widely observed in English heraldry that no two families may use the same crest. This is in contrast to Scottish practice, in which crests are less significant, and are often borne in the same form by unrelated people. As a result of this lack of need for differentiation, Scottish crests tend to be less ornamental than their English counterparts. Marks of cadency are generally not used with crests, though it is not incorrect to do so, and the British royal family continue this practice.

The usual torse around the crest is frequently replaced by some kind of coronet, known as a "crest-coronet". The standard form is a simplified ducal coronet, consisting of three fleurons on a golden circlet; these are not, however, indications of rank, though they are not generally granted nowadays except in special circumstances. In some modern examples, the crest features both a crest-coronet and a torse, though this practice is deprecated by purists.

== Orders of chivalry ==
Perhaps the only places physical crests are still seen are the chapels of Britain's orders of chivalry: the Order of the Garter's St George's Chapel, the Order of the Thistle's Thistle Chapel, and the Order of the Bath's Henry VII Chapel. Within each chapel are rows of stalls for use by the knights; above these stalls are placed each knight's sword and crested helm. These are carved out of lime wood and painted and gilded by Ian Brennan, the official sculptor to the royal household.

== See also ==
- Kolbenturnier
