= Thimelby =

Thimelby is a surname. Notable people with the surname include:

- Gertrude Aston Thimelby (1617–1668), English poet, author, and nun
- Mary Thimelby (1610–1690), English prioress
- Richard Thimelby (1614–1672), English Jesuit missionary priest

== See also ==
- Thymelby
