= Jones baronets of Treeton (1919) =

Escutcheon of the Jones baronets of Treeton

The Jones baronetcy, of Treeton in the County of York, was created in the Baronetage of the United Kingdom on 23 May 1919 for the Yorkshire industrialist Frederick Jones. His son, the 2nd Baronet, was also a businessman. The family seat is Irnham Hall in Irnham, Lincolnshire.

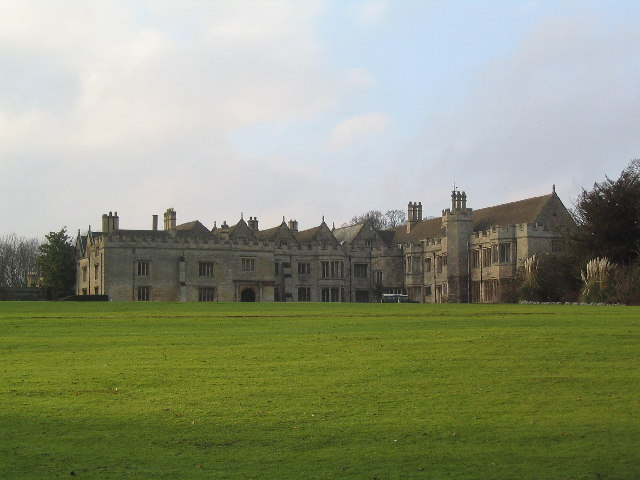
Irnham Hall; the seat of the Jones baronets of Treeton

== Jones baronets, of Treeton (1919) ==
- Sir Frederick John Jones, 1st Baronet (1854–1936)
- Sir Walter Benton Jones, 2nd Baronet (1880–1967)
- Sir Peter Fawcett Benton Jones, 3rd Baronet (1911–1972)
- Sir Simon Warley Frederick Benton Jones, 4th Baronet (1941–2016)
- Sir James Peter Martin Benton Jones, 5th Baronet (born 1973)

The heir apparent is the present holder's son Blake Alexander Benton Jones (born 2009).
