= Sir Frederick Jones, 1st Baronet =

Sir Frederick John Jones, 1st Baronet (1855 – 23 May 1936) was created a Baronet of Treeton in the West Riding of the County of York in the Baronetage of the United Kingdom on 23 May 1919.

He was educated at Repton School and Trinity College, Cambridge.

He held many industrial and commercial directorships and was particularly prominent in coal mining. He was managing director of Rother Vale Collieries Ltd which owned several collieries in the area of Treeton near Rotherham, Yorkshire. These included Treeton, Fence and Orgreave mines. He was a director of United Steel Companies and twice president of the Mining Association of Great Britain.

In 1901, he bought Irnham Hall, Irnham, Lincolnshire which became and remains the family seat.

He was succeeded by his son Walter.

Baronetage of the United Kingdom
New title	Baronet (of Treeton); 1919–1936	Succeeded by Walter Jones
