= Sir Walter Jones, 2nd Baronet =

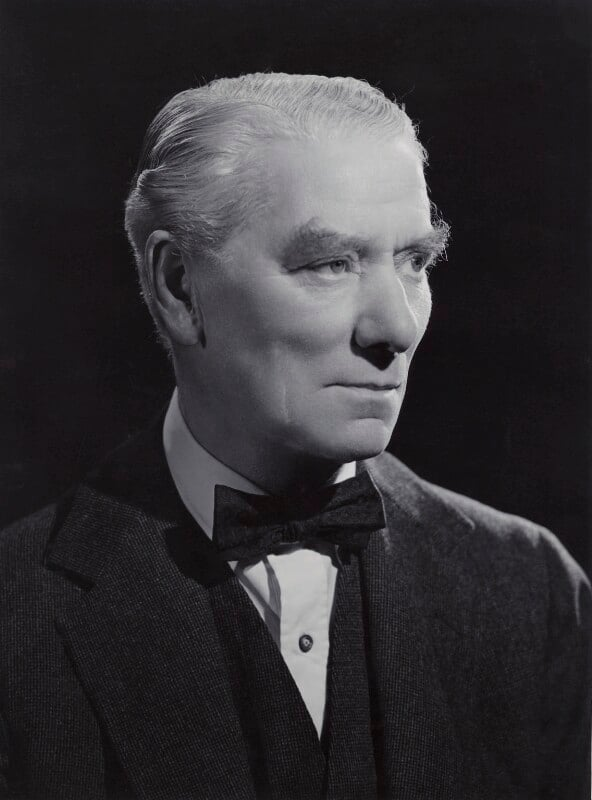
Jones in 1948

Sir Walter Benton Jones, 2nd Baronet (26 September 1880 – 5 December 1967) succeeded to the Baronetcy on the death of his father in 1936.

He was educated at Repton School and Trinity College, Cambridge.

He succeeded his father in 1915 as managing director of Rother Vale Collieries which owned mines around Treeton, near Rotherham, Yorkshire and, like his father, became a prominent industrialist with numerous interests and directorships in mining, steel and banking in Yorkshire and elsewhere.

He lived at Whirlow Brook Hall, Sheffield, Yorkshire which he built in about 1906 and later at the family seat Irnham Hall, Irnham, Lincolnshire.

He married Lily Fawcett and was succeeded by their son Peter (9 January 1911 – 11 November 1972). His other children were Pamela (24 March 1908 – 22 January 1997) and Rachel Mary (15 November 1918 – 2002).

Baronetage of the United Kingdom
Preceded by Frederick Jones	Baronet (of Treeton); 1936–1967	Succeeded by Peter Benton Jones
