= Baston course =

15th-century type of tournament with maces

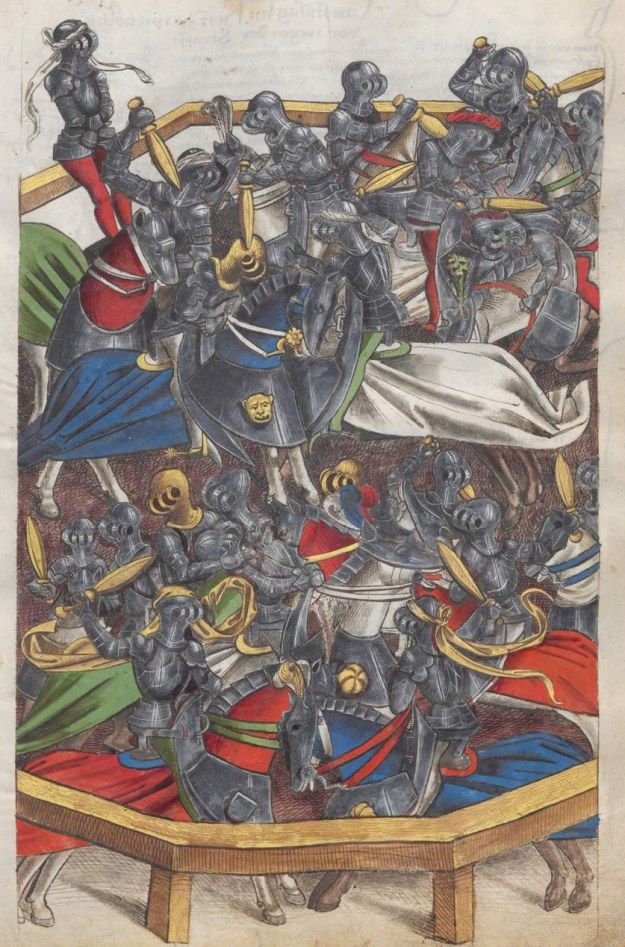
An illustration of a Kolbenturnier in the Wappenbuch Conrads von Grünenberg.

The baston course (cf. German: Kolbenturnier, "mace tournament") was a type of tournament in the fifteenth century in which competitors would try to batter each other and knock crests off of the helmets of their opponents. They were fought between small groups in limited fenced-in areas using only maces (Middle English: bastons, German: Kolben).

== Gear ==
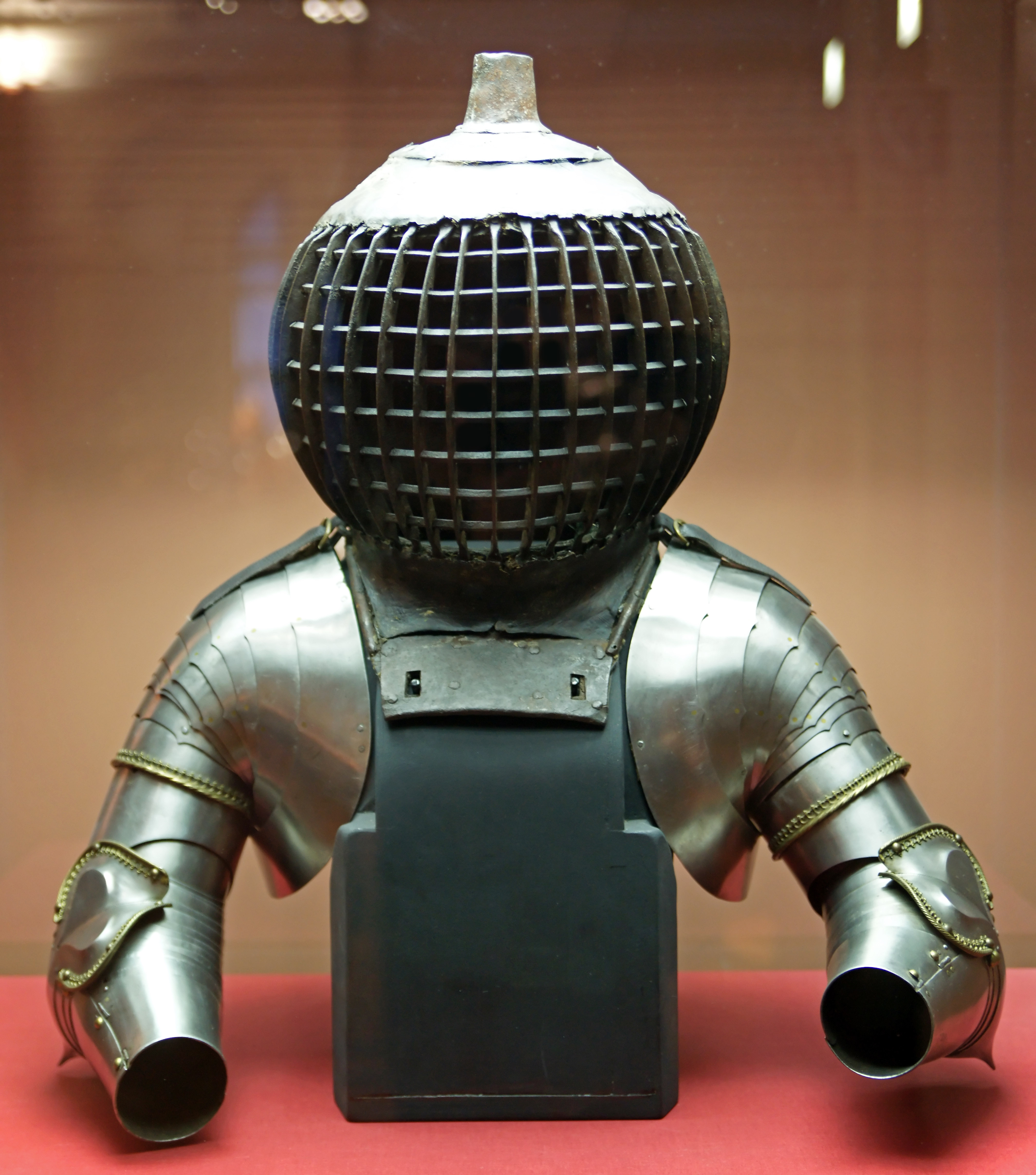
An example of the type of helmet used, without a crest.

The German Kolben was a type of polygonally-cut mace made of hard wood, about 80 centimeters in length. They swelled along the shaft to end in an obtuse point, and had a rounded iron pommel as well as a short grip.

The German helmets used, known as Kolbenturnierhelms, were huge, rounded forms of the bascinet, attached to the cuirass in both the back and front. The face was covered in metal bars, and the interior was heavily padded to avoid blunt-force injury. The helmet bars formed an iron framework covered in canvas and gesso impressed with floral and heraldic designs.

The crests used were fancifully designed, and were made of light and fragile materials. They were fixed in position on the helmets using an iron bar or brooch.

== Phases ==
In the fifteenth century in central Europe, the Kolbenturnier was a carefully-orchestrated sociopolitical event as well as a martial competition, and it had distinct phases.

First was the Helmschau, or the helmet inspection phase, in which helmets were placed on display, their crests were tested for accuracy, and the ancestry and chivalric history of the competitors was evaluated.

After the Helmschau, the Kolbenturnier proper took place, in which competitors wore their heavily padded helmets to protect from the blunt-force trauma of the competition. During the Kolbenturnier, any competitor deemed to have committed chivalric misconduct in the Helmschau phase could be punished by being attacked by all other competitors simultaneously.

When the Kolbenturnier phase was over, there was sometimes a third phase called the Schrankensetzen. This was a punishment reserved for competitors who had been found to have lied about their lineage in order to participate in the Kolbenturnier. Their saddle was mounted on the fence surrounding the combat enclosure, and they were made to sit on it without a helmet for the rest of the tournament. Both competitors and spectators were expected to insult and berate the liar.

Finally, the Nachturnier, or end tournament phase, took place in which competitors attempted to destroy their opponents' crests with their weapons, sometimes while on horseback. This was a literal and symbolic deconstruction of the opening Helmschau phase, and put the tournament to an end.
