= Gertrude Aston Thimelby =

English poet and author

Gertrude Aston Thimelby (née Aston, c. 1617–1668) was an English recusant, poet and author, who became a Roman Catholic nun later in life.

== Life ==
Thimelby was born about 1617 on the family estate in Tixal, Staffordshire. She was the fourth daughter and one of the ten children of Walter Aston, 1st Lord Aston of Forfar, a British diplomat, and his wife Gertrude Aston (née Sadler), who had married in 1607. Her mother was the daughter of Thomas Sadler of Standon and his wife Ursula Sharington; and was the granddaughter of Ralph Sadler, statesman and the treasurer-general to King Edward VI.

In 1622, Thimbley's father was sent to Madrid as the resident ambassador to the Spanish court to negotiate a marriage between Charles, the Prince of Wales, and the Infanta Maria Anna of Spain and also provisions for joint naval operations to patrol and suppress piracy. He took his wife and children with him. Sir Walter stayed in Spain for six years, where he converted to Roman Catholicism.

Thimelby wrote poetry as a member of a Roman Catholic literary circle, now known as the "Astons of Tixall". The Aston and Thimelby families and their literary circle exchanged and collected manuscript poems and letters, known today through the volumes edited by their descendants.

In 1645, she married Henry Thimelby (died 1655), who the third son of Richard Thimelby and was form a large recusant family. Her husbands' sister Katherine was also a poet, and was the wife of her own brother Herbert Aston. The families have been described as "closely knit." Thimleby most likely lived with her husband at Corby, near Irnham, in Lincolnshire, during their marriage, where 41 per cent of the population remained Catholic (according to a 1676 survey).

On 29 September 1658, after the deaths of her husband and only child, Gertrude was professed as a nun at St. Monica's Convent, Louvain in Flanders, where another sister-in-law, Winefrid Thimelby, a notable letter-writer, was the Prioress. Sister Gertrude died lived for the rest of her life at St. Monica's Convent and died in 1668.

== Selected works ==
- "Mrs Thimelby, on the Death of Her Only Child"
- "No Love Like That of the Soul"
- "The Sick Poetesse"
- "Upon a Command to Write on my Father"
