= Hawthorpe, Lincolnshire =

Hamlet in Lincolnshire, England

Coordinates: 52.835129°N 0.44539547°W

Hawthorpe
- Location within Lincolnshire
- OS grid reference: TF 048275
  - London: 95 mi (153 km) S
- District: South Kesteven
- Shire county: Lincolnshire
- Region: East Midlands
- Country: England
- Sovereign state: United Kingdom
- Post town: Bourne
- Postcode district: PE10
- Police: Lincolnshire
- Fire: Lincolnshire
- Ambulance: East Midlands
- UK Parliament: Grantham and Stamford

Hawthorpe is a hamlet in the South Kesteven district of Lincolnshire, England, and the civil parish of Irnham, Bulby and Hawthorpe. It is west from the A15, east from the A1, and 5 miles (8.0 km) north-west from the town of Bourne.

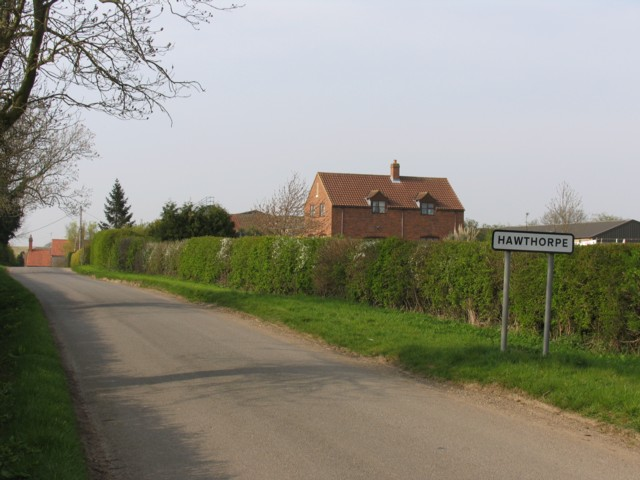
Hawthorpe from the south

Hawthorpe is mentioned in the Domesday Book as "Awartorp", in the Beltisloe Hundred of Kesteven. It comprised 2 households, 2 villagers and 4 freemen, with 2.9 ploughlands, a meadow of 8 acres (0.032 km^{2}) and woodland of 320 acres (1.3 km^{2}). In 1066 the Lord was Healfdene; after 1086 Lordship was given to Alfred of Lincoln.

In the 1872 White's Directory the two hamlets of Bulby and Hawthorpe were grouped as Bulby-cum-Hawthorpe forming the eastern side of Irnham parish, being a joint township with a population of 180 in 1,767 acres (7.2 km^{2}) "of fertile land". About 1,000 acres (4.0 km^{2}) of Bulby-cum-Hawthorpe land was purchased by Rev. William Watson Smith in about 1840, who built on it the Elizabethan-style Bulby House and grounds. By 1872, Bulby House and 1,100 acres (4.5 km^{2}) of township land was owned by Gilbert Heathcote-Drummond-Willoughby, 1st Earl of Ancaster (Lord Aveland), who was lord of the manor. A moated area evident at the time was said to be the site of Bulby Hall which is "supposed to have been burnt down in the Barons' wars".

In the 1885 Kelly's Directory Hawthorpe is written as having an 1881 population of 70, and as a joint township with the hamlet of Bulby for the support of the poor. Hawthorpe belonged principally to Lord Aveland, who lived at Bulby House.

Listed buildings in the hamlet centre on Hawthorpe Farm, including a 17th-century farmhouse, 19th-century cottages, and 17th- to 19th-century barns and stables, all Grade II.
