= Jones baronets =

Escutcheon of the Jones baronets of Albemarlis

There have been eight baronetcies created for persons with the surname Jones, one in the Baronetage of England, one in the Baronetage of Great Britain and six in the Baronetage of the United Kingdom. Three of the creations are extant as of 2026.

- Jones baronets of Albemarlis (1643): see Sir Henry Jones, 1st Baronet (died 1644)
- Jones baronets of Ramsbury (1774): see Jones baronets of Ramsbury (1774)
- Jones, later Jones-Brydges baronets, of Boultibrook (1807): see Jones-Brydges baronets
- Jones, later Lawrence-Jones baronets, of Cranmer Hall (1831): see Lawrence-Jones baronets
- Jones, later Prichard-Jones baronets, of Bron Menai (1910): see Prichard-Jones baronets
- Jones baronets of Pentower (1917)
- Jones baronets of Treeton (1919)
- Jones, later Probyn-Jones baronets, of Rhyll (1926): see Probyn-Jones baronets

== See also ==
- Tyrwhitt Jones baronets of Stanley Hall, Shropshire, in Baron Berners
