= Gilbert of Sempringham =

English Roman Catholic saint

Saint Gilbert of Sempringham
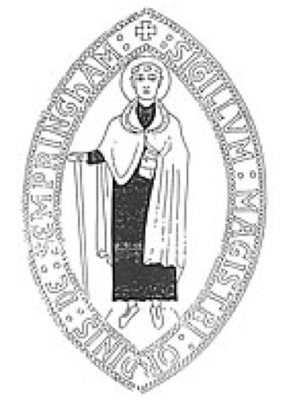
- Seal of the master of Sempringham, depicting St Gilbert
- Born: c. 1085; Sempringham, Lincolnshire, Kingdom of England
- Died: 4 February 1189; Sempringham, Lincolnshire, Kingdom of England (aged 104 or 105)
- Venerated in: Catholic Church, Church of England
- Canonized: 1202, Rome by Pope Innocent III
- Feast: 4 February
- Attributes: cross portate

Gilbert of Sempringham (c. 1085 – 4 February 1189) was an English Catholic who founded the Gilbertine Order. He was the only medieval Englishman to found a conventual order, mainly because the Cîteaux Abbey declined his request to assist him in organising a group of nuns living with lay brothers and sisters. He founded a double monastery of canons regular and nuns in spite of such a foundation being contrary to canonical practice.

== Life ==
Gilbert was born at Sempringham, near Bourne in Lincolnshire, the son of Jocelin, an Anglo-Norman lord of the manor, and an unnamed Anglo-Saxon mother. He had a brother, Roger, and a sister, Agnes.

Unusually for that period, his father actively prevented his son from becoming a knight, instead sending him to France, probably the University of Paris but possibly under Anselm of Laon, to study theology. Some physical deformity may have made him unfit for military service, making an ecclesiastical career the best option. When he returned in 1120 he became a clerk in the household of Robert Bloet, Bishop of Lincoln, started a school for boys and girls (the existing primary school at Pointon is still named after him) and was ordained by Robert's successor, Alexander. Offered the archdeaconry of Lincoln, he refused, saying that he knew no surer way to perdition.

In the period 1115-1123 he was given both the vacant churches of Sempringham and West Torrington, near Wragby, by his father, Jocelin. In 1129 he became the Vicar of both St Andrew's, Sempringham and St Mary's, West Torrington having been instituted by Robert Bloet, Bishop of Lincoln.

"Gilbert was a lover of truth and justice, chastity and sobriety, and a diligent cultivator of the other virtues: wherefore he was revered and praised by all and obtained their favour and regard. Even Jocelin now rejoiced in the goodness of his son, he began to cherish him with fatherly affection, and ministered to his needs out of his own riches. Gilbert would be in his late twenties when his father presented him to the vacant churches of Sempringham and West Torrington, which he had built on his own demesne 'in the custom of his country' "

== The Gilbertines ==
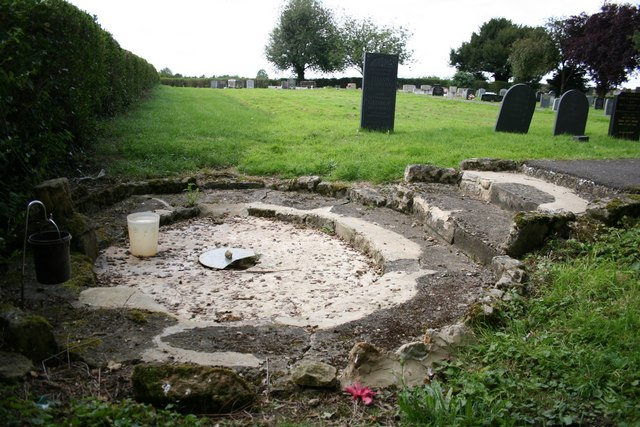
St Gilbert's well at Sempringham

When his father died in 1130, Gilbert became lord of the manor of Sempringham and West Torrington. In 1131 he founded the Gilbertine Order, and with the help of Alexander constructed at Sempringham a dwelling and cloister for nuns, at the north of the church of St Andrew. Eventually he had a chain of twenty-six convents, monasteries and missions. A custom developed in the houses of the order called "the plate of the Lord Jesus", whereby the best portions of the dinner were put on a special plate and shared with the poor. In 1148 he approached the Cistercians for help. They refused because he included women in his order. The male part of the order consisted of Canons Regular.

In 1165 Gilbert was charged with having aided Thomas Becket when Thomas fled from King Henry II after the council of Northampton, but he was eventually found innocent. In 1174 some of his lay brothers revolted, but he received the backing of Pope Alexander III. Gilbert resigned his office late in life because of blindness and died at Sempringham in about 1190, at the claimed age of 106.

The only religious order of English origin founded during the Middle Ages, it thrived until the dissolution of the monasteries under King Henry VIII.

== Veneration ==
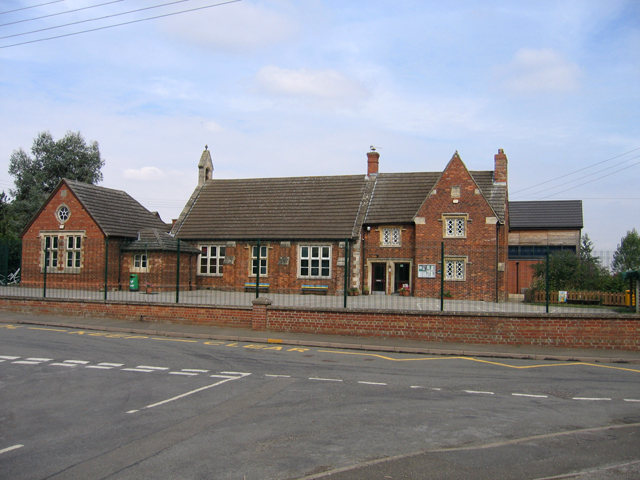
St Gilbert of Sempringham C of E Primary School, Pointon, Lincs

Gilbert was canonised in 1202 by Pope Innocent III. His liturgical feast day is on 4 February, commemorating his death, as it remains also in the Church of England (commemoration). According to the order of Hubert Walter, the bishops of England celebrated his feast, and his name was added to the wall of the church of the Four Crowned Martyrs. His Order did not outlast the English Reformation, however, and despite being influenced by Continental models, it did not maintain a foothold in Europe. There are, however, at least three primary schools in England named after him: in Pointon, Stamford, Lincolnshire and Winton, Greater Manchester.

== See also ==
- List of Catholic saints
