= Pointon and Sempringham =

Civil parish in Lincolnshire, England

Coordinates: 52°52′44″N 00°20′39″W

Pointon and Sempringham is a civil parish in the English county of Lincolnshire.

Forming part of the non-metropolitan district of South Kesteven its main populated places are Sempringham, Pointon and Millthorpe. The population of the civil parish at the 2011 census was 532.
