= Sempringham =

Hamlet in the South Kesteven district of Lincolnshire, England

Coordinates: 52.885224°N 0.3412°W

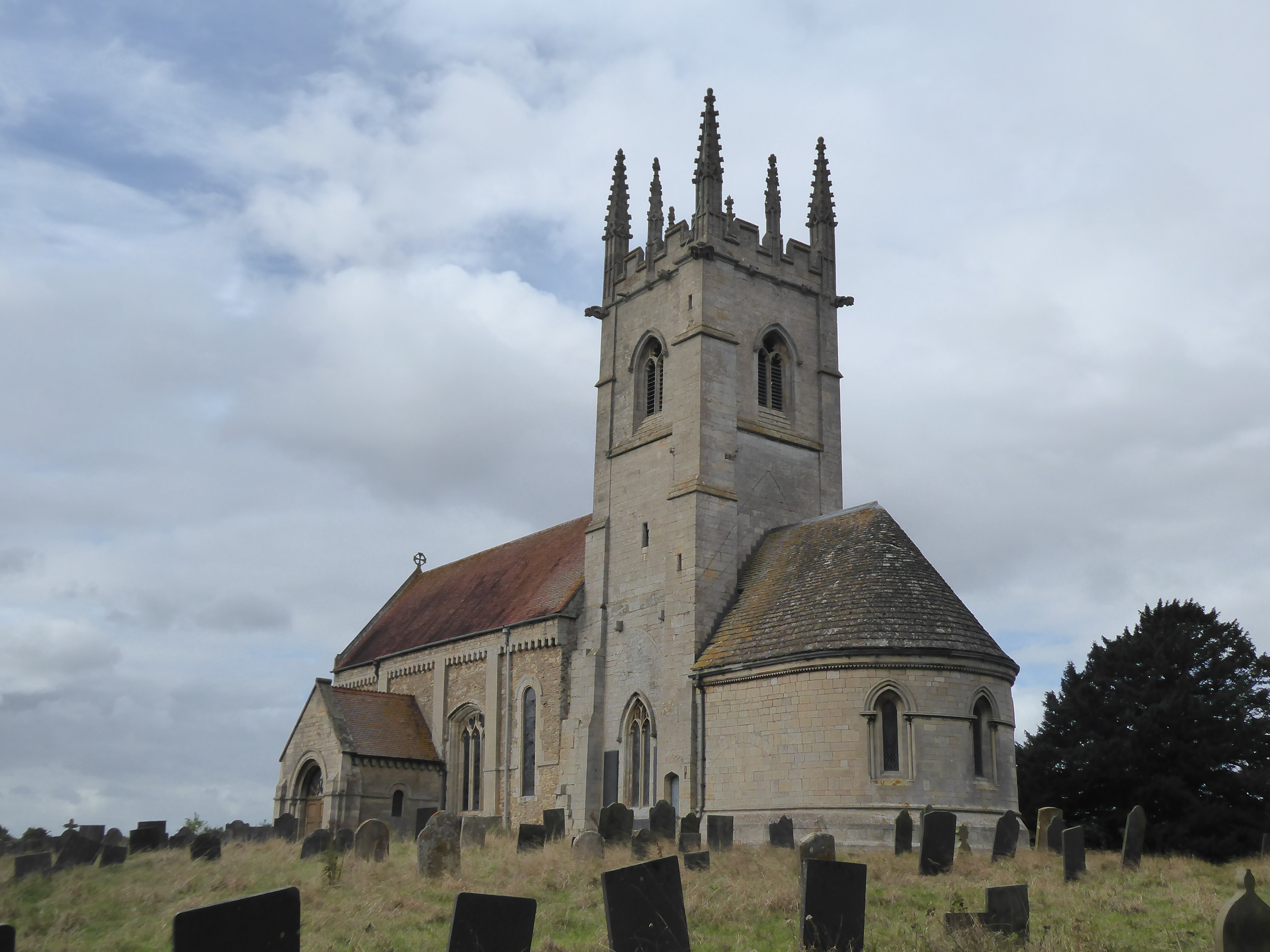
- St Andrew's Church

- Location within Lincolnshire
- OS grid reference: TF117332
  - London: 95 mi (153 km) S
- Civil parish: Pointon and Sempringham
- District: South Kesteven
- Shire county: Lincolnshire
- Region: East Midlands
- Country: England
- Sovereign state: United Kingdom
- Post town: Sleaford
- Postcode district: NG34
- Police: Lincolnshire
- Fire: Lincolnshire
- Ambulance: East Midlands
- UK Parliament: Grantham and Stamford

Sempringham is a village in the civil parish of Pointon and Sempringham, in the South Kesteven district of Lincolnshire, England. It is situated 2 miles (3.2 km) south from the A52 road, 12 miles (19 km) east from Grantham and 8 miles (13 km) north from Bourne. The hamlet is on the western edge of the Lincolnshire Fens, the closest village being Billingborough, 0.5 miles (0.8 km) to the north on the B1177 road. Sempringham is noted as the home of Gilbert of Sempringham, the son of the lord of the manor. Gilbert is the only English Saint to have founded a monastic order, the Gilbertines. In 1921 the parish had a population of 112. On 1 April 1931 the parish was abolished to form "Pointon and Sempringham".

Sempringham consists of a church and a holy well, with other houses east from the church scattered along the B1177 between Pointon and Billingborough. The church stands at an altitude of about 52 feet (16 m), on land rising out of flat fenland. Pointon is the chief township of the civil parish, which includes Millthorpe and the fens of Pointon, Neslam and Aslackby, and a part of Hundred Fen at Gosberton Clough. Formerly, Birthorpe, now part of Billingborough, was included in the parish.

The parish church is a Grade I listed building, dedicated to Saint Andrew and dating from 1170. It was restored and the chancel rebuilt in 1868–69 by Edward Browning.

Sempringham is noted in the Domesday Book of 1086 as "Stepingeham" in the Aveland Hundred of Kesteven. In 1086 the manor consisted of 35 households, 8 villagers, 2 smallholders and 14 freemen, with 4.3 ploughlands, a meadow of 11 acres (0.045 km^{2}) and woodland of 7 acres (0.028 km^{2}). In 1066 Earl Morcar was Lord of the manor, which was transferred to Jocelyn, son of Lambert in 1086, with Tenant-in-chief as Alfred of Lincoln.

In the early 17th century, Sempringham was a centre of the Puritan movement in Lincolnshire. Samuel Skelton, curate of Sempringham, sailed to Massachusetts Bay in 1628 with the first group of Puritan settlers, who landed in Salem. Another member of the Sempringham congregation at the time was the young Anne Dudley, later Anne Bradstreet, the colony's first published poet.

== Sempringham Priory ==
Sempringham is the site of St Mary's Priory, a priory that was founded by Saint Gilbert (also known as Gilbert of Sempringham).

The priory was built by Gilbert of Sempringham, the only English Saint to have founded a monastic order. St Gilbert established the Gilbertine Order in 1131 by inducting 'seven maidens' who were his pupils when young. Alexander, Bishop of Lincoln, helped in establishing the religious buildings to the north of the parish church. Gilbert died at Sempringham in 1189 and was buried in the priory church. He was canonized on 13 October 1202 for the many miracles noted at his tomb in the priory and Sempringham became a site of pilgrimage.

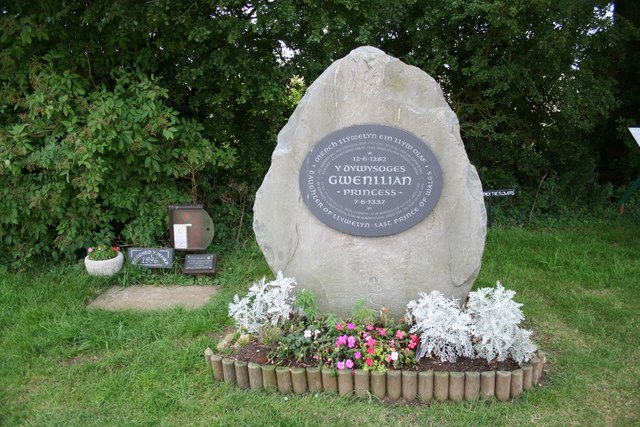
Monument to Gwenllian

It became the enforced residence of Gwenllian of Wales, the daughter of Llywelyn ap Gruffudd, Prince of Wales, and the granddaughter of Simon de Montfort. In 1283 Gwenllian had been captured by King Edward I's troops. Edward sent Gwenllian 'in her cradle', to be held there in security. In 1327, Edward III stayed at the Priory and granted Gwenllian a lifelong yearly pension of £20, necessary to pay her board and lodgings as she never became a nun, but was regarded as a 'paying guest' who was not permitted to leave. Gwenllian died at the Priory after being held there for 54 years, on 7 June 1337. A memorial stone has been erected in her honour.

At the dissolution of the monasteries, Sempringham Priory came to the Clintons, who demolished it and reused the stone to build their residence on the site. Today little remains of priory or residence.
