= Geoffrey Luttrell =

English gentleman who commissioned the Luttrell Psalter

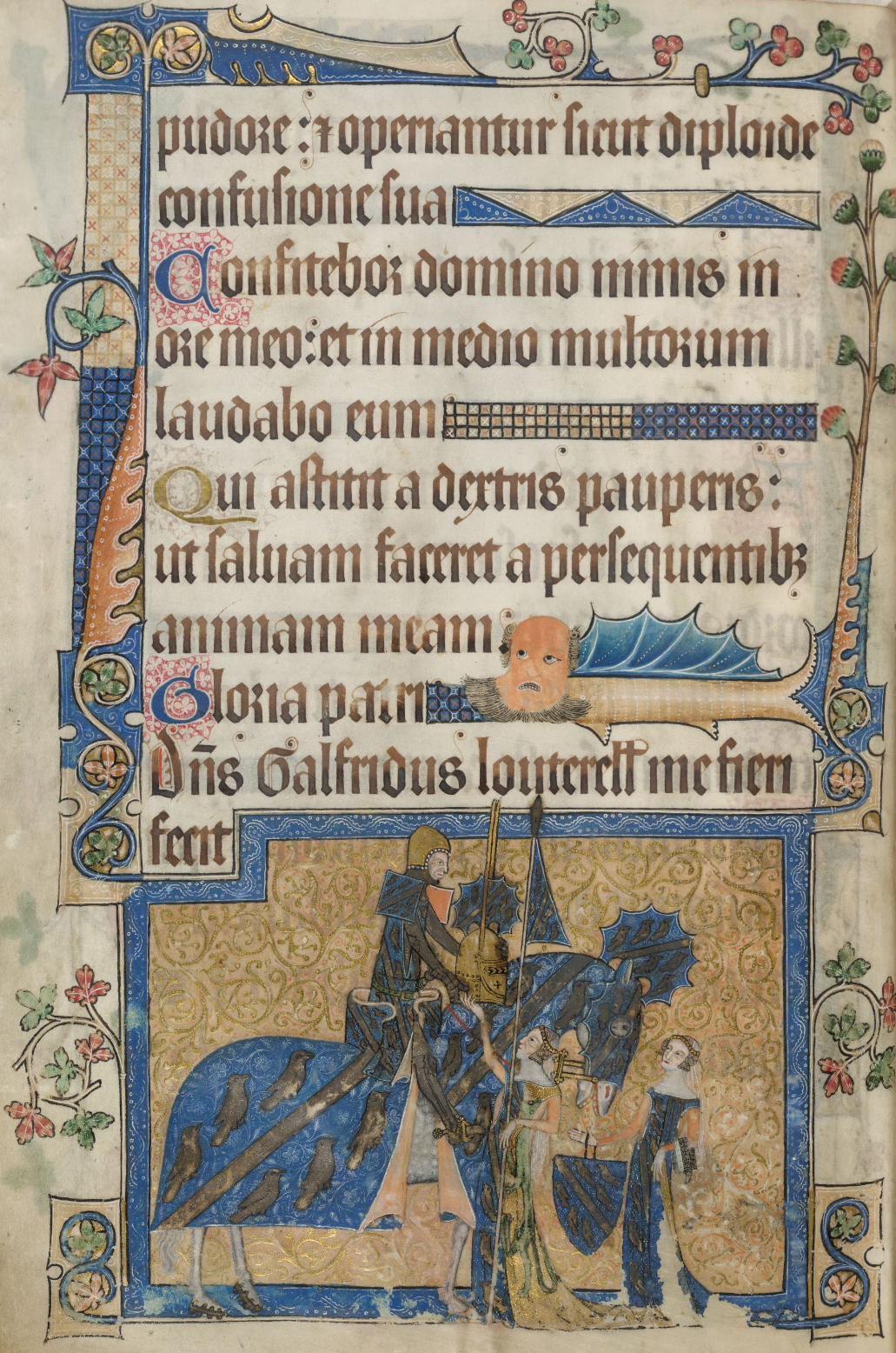
Sir Geoffrey Luttrell, mounted, being assisted by his wife and daughter-in-law. Folio 202 verso of the Luttrell Psalter

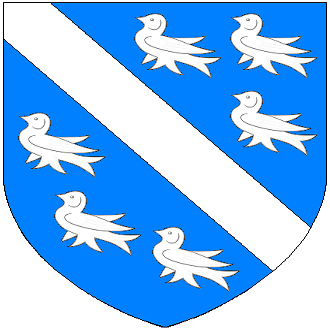
Arms of Luttrell of Irnham: Azure, a bend between six martlets argent

Sir Geoffrey Luttrell III (1276 – 23 May 1345) lord of the manor of Irnham in Lincolnshire was a mediaeval knight remembered principally today as having commissioned the Luttrell Psalter, a rare and profusely illustrated manuscript now in the British Library in London.

== Origins ==
Geoffrey Luttrell was born in 1276 and was the son of Robert Luttrell (died 1296). He succeeded his father in 1297. He was a descendant of Sir Geoffrey de Luterel. He was referred to as the 2nd Lord of Irnham. His family's arms were: Azure, a bend between six martlets argent. An Irish branch of the Luttrell family bore the same arms but differenced by tincture (Or, a bend between six martlets sable),

== Career ==
Within the last five years before his death in 1345 he commissioned the Luttrell Psalter, the illustrations to which include a representation of him, his wife and his daughter-in-law, with profuse display of his armorials.

Although he has been praised for his patronage of the arts, it seems that Luttrell, like many medieval landowners, was capable of ruthlessness and violence. A private war which he conducted together with his neighbours Roger de Birthorpe, Edmund Colville and Guy Goband against the monks of Sempringham Priory was considered serious enough to warrant a Royal Commission of Inquiry in 1312. However, it has been argued that Birthorpe was the principal offender and that Luttrell was to blame only for supporting his friend; this may be borne out by the fact that while Birthorpe was outlawed for a time, Luttrell seems to have escaped any censure.

== Marriage and children ==
Sir Geoffrey married Agnes the daughter of Sir Richard of Sutton. She died in June 1339 or 1340.

Their Issue:

1. Robert, d. 1320

2. Andrew, his heir.

3. Sir Geoffrey, who married Constance, daughter of Geoffrey Scrope.

4. Robert, a Knight of the Hospital of St. John of Jerusalem.

5. Isabel, a Gilbertine nun.

6. Elizabeth, who married Walter, son of Sir Walter Gloucester.
