= Jones baronets of Pentower (1917) =

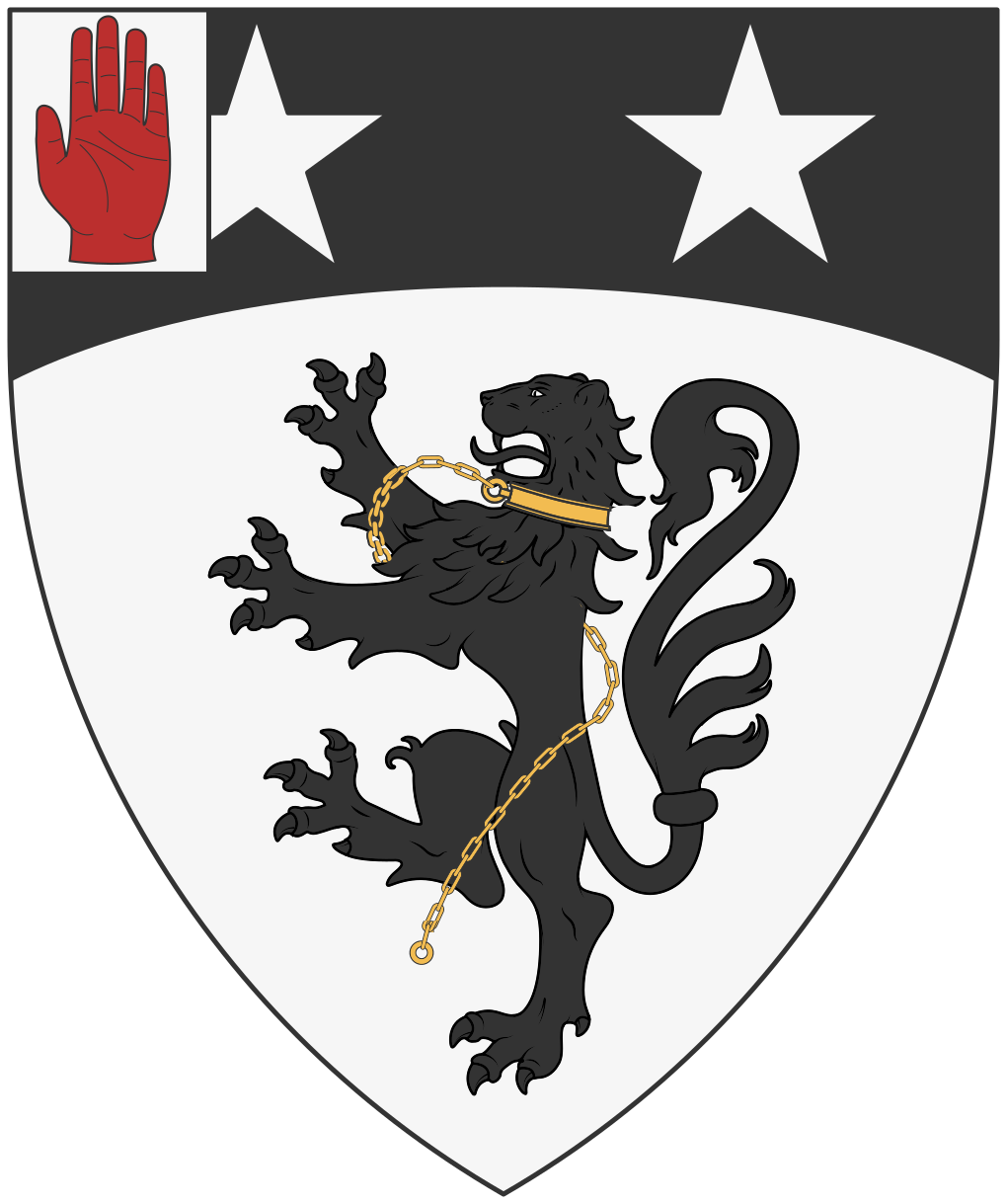
The coat of arms of Jones of Penthouse, Baronets.

The Jones baronetcy, of Pentower, Fishguard in the County of Pembroke, was created in the Baronetage of the United Kingdom on 9 July 1917 for the Welsh civil engineer Evan Davies Jones. The title became extinct on the death of the 2nd Baronet in 1952.

== Jones baronets, of Pentower (1917) ==
- Sir Evan Davies Jones, 1st Baronet (1859–1949)
- Sir Tom Barry Jones, 2nd Baronet (1888–1952). He left no heir, and the title was extinct on his death.
