= Mary Thimelby =

English prioress (1610–1690)

- Born: 1610; Irnham Hall
- Died: 31 August 1690 (aged 79–80); Leuven
- Occupation: nun
- Known for: Prioress

Mary Thimelby (1610 – 31 August 1690) was an English prioress of St Monica at Leuven.

== Life ==
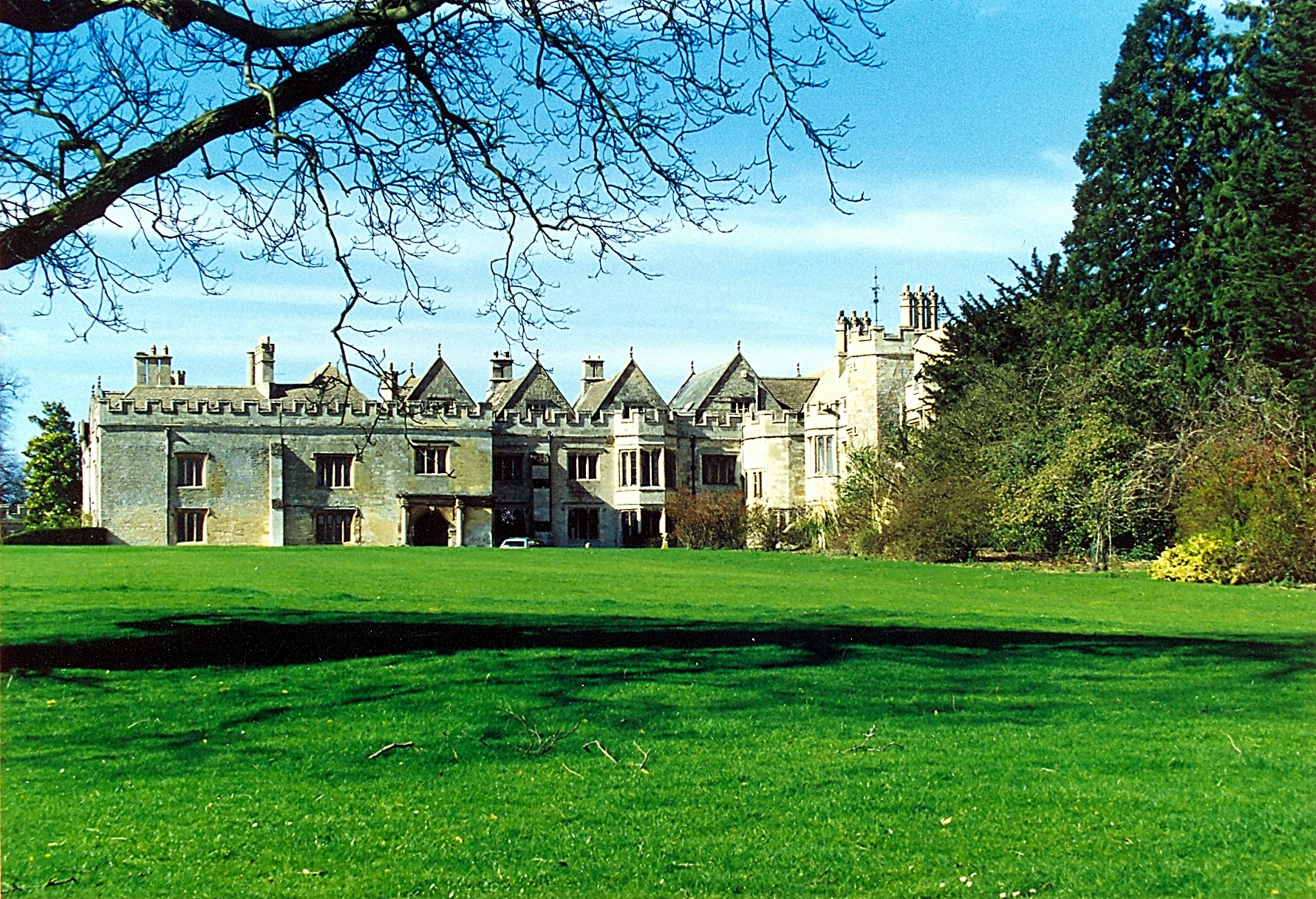
Irnham Hall, near Bourne, Lincolnshire more recently

Thimelby was born in Irnham Hall in Lincolnshire. Her parents were Mary (born Brookesby) and Richard Thimelby. Her ancestors were known for harbouring Catholics hiding from the Protestant authorities. Her father spent a year in the Tower of London around the time of her birth and her mother was brought up by her widowed mother Eleanor Brooksby and her sister Anne Vaux. They harboured many priests including Henry Garnet who was executed in 1605 for his part in the Gunpowder Plot. The families were discriminated against as Catholics and fined regularly. Irrespective of this the Thimbleby's kept a full time priest at the home. Her father wanted to have at least one of his children to follow a religious life and Mary decided that she would like to be a nun.

She and her younger sister, Frances, joined the nuns at St. Monica's Convent in Louvain in Flanders. It was one of seven communities of English nuns who had moved to the continent to avoid the repression of Catholics. Her brother John was then head of the family as their parents and their family priest had all died. Her aunt, Elizabeth Clifford, was already at the convent although had not taken the full vows of a nun. However when her age allowed, Mary became a choir nun in 1635. Her sister had intended to also become a nun but Frances died in 1644 in Liege. The prioress was Margaret Throckmorton whose family assisted the community financially.

She was a notable letter-writer and she was unanimously voted in as the new Prioress after Margaret Throckmorton died on 26 October 1668.

In 1658, after the deaths of her husband and only child, Gertrude Thimelby, her sister in law became a nun at St. Monica's Convent. Sister Gertrude died in 1668.

Thimelby died in Leuven in 1690 after resigning from her leadership role a week before.
