= Pointon =

Village in Lincolnshire, England

Coordinates: 52.872618°N 0.341646°W

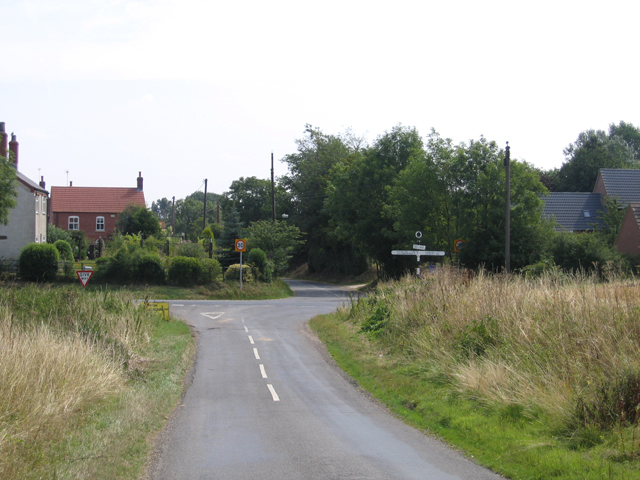
- Millthorpe crossroads, Pointon

- Location within Lincolnshire
- Population: 533 (2021)
- OS grid reference: TF117318
  - London: 95 mi (153 km) S
- Civil parish: Pointon and Sempringham
- District: South Kesteven
- Shire county: Lincolnshire
- Region: East Midlands
- Country: England
- Sovereign state: United Kingdom
- Post town: Sleaford
- Postcode district: NG34
- Police: Lincolnshire
- Fire: Lincolnshire
- Ambulance: East Midlands
- UK Parliament: Grantham and Bourne

Pointon is a village in the civil parish of Pointon and Sempringham, in the South Kesteven district of Lincolnshire, England. In 2021 the parish of "Pointon and Sempringham" has a population of 533. The majority of the parish's population live in Pointon. It is situated 7 miles (11.3 km) north of Bourne.

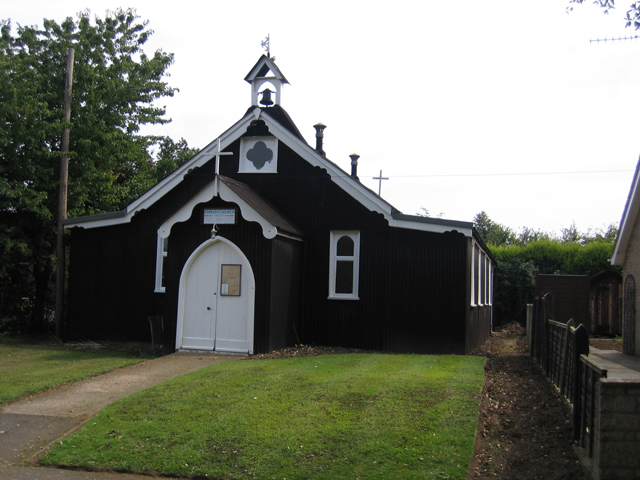
Christchurch, Pointon

Pointon is part of the ecclesiastical parish of Pointon and Sempringham. Christchurch, in Pinfold Lane, Pointon, is a 'tin tabernacle' of wood and corrugated iron; it was erected in 1893 as a chapel of ease. The parish church, dedicated to Saint Andrew, is in Sempringham. In 1885, a Kelly's Directory noted Pointon as being in the then parish of Sempringham-cum-Pointon and Birthorpe, with St Andrew's church "situated on an eminence, overlooking the Fen district, about half a mile from any residence now existing". A 1916 Lincolnshire guidebook noted: "The parish church (St Andrew) stands on a hill nearly 1 m. from its principal hamlet of Pointon".

St Gilbert of Sempringham C of E Primary School, on West Road, dates from 1863.

Pointon was formerly a chapelry in the parish of Sempringham, in 1866 Pointon became a separate civil parish, on 1 April 1931 the parish was abolished to form "Pointon and Sempringham". In 1921 the parish had a population of 405.
