= Bulby =

Hamlet in Lincolnshire, England

Coordinates: 52.822243°N 0.438021°W

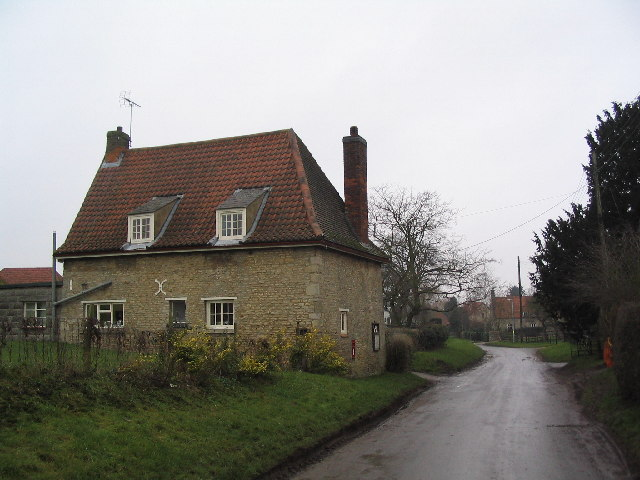
- Road through Bulby

- Location within Lincolnshire
- OS grid reference: TF053261
  - London: 90 mi (140 km) S
- Civil parish: Irnham, Bulby and Hawthorpe
- District: South Kesteven
- Shire county: Lincolnshire
- Region: East Midlands
- Country: England
- Sovereign state: United Kingdom
- Post town: Bourne
- Postcode district: PE10
- Police: Lincolnshire
- Fire: Lincolnshire
- Ambulance: East Midlands
- UK Parliament: Rutland and Stamford

Bulby is a hamlet in the South Kesteven district of Lincolnshire, England, and in the civil parish of Irnham, Bulby and Hawthorpe. The village is situated west of the A15, east of the A1, and approximately 4 miles (6 km) north-west from the town of Bourne.

In 1872 the two hamlets of Bulby and Hawthorpe were grouped as Bulby-cum-Hawthorpe forming the eastern side of Irnham parish, being a joint township with a population of 180 in 1,767 acres (7.2 km^{2}) "of fertile land". About 1,000 acres (4.0 km^{2}) of Bulby-cum-Hawthorpe land was purchased by Rev. William Watson Smith in about 1840, who built on it the Elizabethan-style Bulby House and grounds. By 1872, Bulby House and 1,100 acres (4.5 km^{2}) of township land was owned by Gilbert Heathcote-Drummond-Willoughby, 1st Earl of Ancaster (Lord Aveland), who was lord of the manor. A moated area evident at the time was said to be the site of Bulby Hall which is "supposed to have been burnt down in the Barons' wars".

Bulby has close associations with farming, has a number of surrounding farms, and a plant nursery.

The River East Glen passes close to the west of the hamlet.

There is evidence of a previous Bulby Hall, and two Medieval settlements: Little Bulby and East Bulby.
