= Robert Luttrell =

Lord Chancellor of Ireland

Lord Chancellor of Ireland
- In office 1238–1245
- Preceded by: Ralph de Norwich
- Succeeded by: William Welwood

The Robert Luttrell who settled on the banks of the Liffey near Dublin at Luttrellstown, was in 1226 made treasurer of St. Patrick's Cathedral and Archdeacon of Armagh, and in 1236 was appointed Lord Chancellor of Ireland which office he held until 1245.

There is mention of a Michael Luttrell in 1287, who owned the same estate at the close of the century, and later in 1349 of a Simon Luttrell, who died in the possession of the property. The next owner whose name we have is Robert Luttrell, who married a daughter of Sir Elias de Ashbourne, of Devon, England, and by this marriage added materially to his already large estate.

It is not certain whether the head of the Irish branch was a son or a brother of Sir Geoffrey, but it is reasonable that he bore either the one or the other relation, for the reason that the lands of Luttrellstown secured by royal grant by Sir Geoffrey were from this time (of Geoffrey's death) owned by Sir Robert Luttrell, head of the Irish branch, who lived at Lucan, near Dublin, and that it remained in the family until the early part of the nineteenth century. It is likely that Robert owed his career advancement largely to his relationship with Sir Geoffrey since his own abilities as a judge were not highly regarded. On the other hand, he may have had some financial expertise, since he assisted Geoffrey de Turville, the Lord Treasurer of Ireland, in the Exchequer of Ireland in the 1230s.

== See also ==
- Other members of the Luttrell family
- Luttrellstown Castle
