= Birthorpe =

Small hamlet in the South Kesteven district of Lincolnshire, England

Coordinates: 52.891416°N 0.360056°W

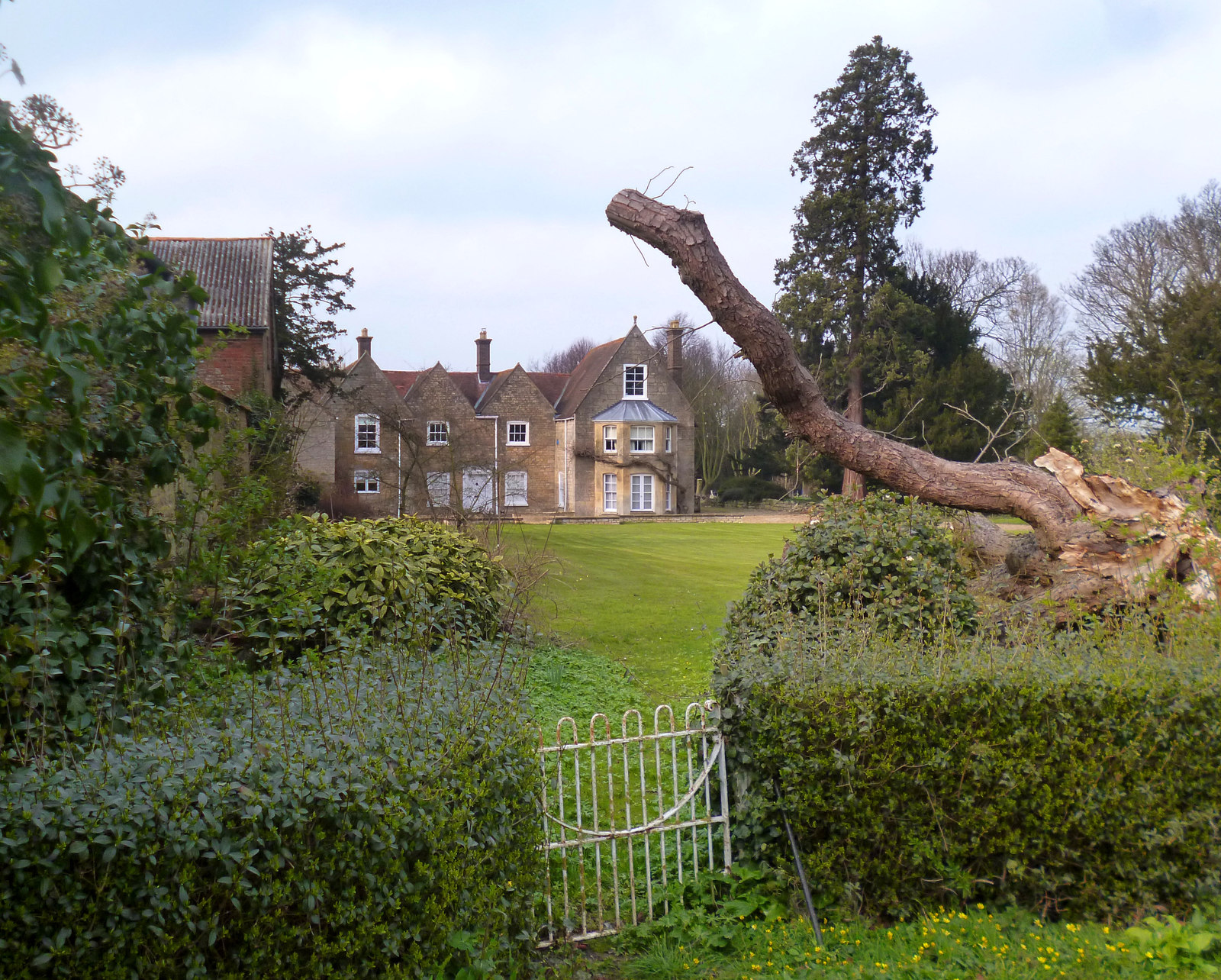
- Birthorpe Manor

- Location within Lincolnshire
- OS grid reference: TF104339
  - London: 95 mi (153 km) S
- Civil parish: Billingborough
- District: South Kesteven
- Shire county: Lincolnshire
- Region: East Midlands
- Country: England
- Sovereign state: United Kingdom
- Post town: Sleaford
- Postcode district: NG34
- Dialling code: 01529
- Police: Lincolnshire
- Fire: Lincolnshire
- Ambulance: East Midlands
- UK Parliament: Grantham and Bourne

Birthorpe is a hamlet in the civil parish of Billingborough, in the South Kesteven district of Lincolnshire, England. It is situated less than 1 mile (2 km) west from Billingborough and the B1177 Pointon Road, and 2 miles (3 km) east from Folkingham. Birthorpe was formerly in the parish of Semperingham, in 1866 Birthorpe became a separate civil parish, on 1 April 1931 the parish was abolished and merged with Billingborough. In 1921 the parish had a population of 46.

Birthorpe is regarded as a shrunken medieval village. The Manor House and farm house are listed buildings.

There was a substantial manor here well before 1300: the family who owned it took their name from the village. The most notable family member was Roger de Birthorpe (died c.1345), who had a distinguished career as a judge in Ireland, becoming Chief Baron of the Irish Exchequer in 1327. Roger was a somewhat controversial figure, who fled to Ireland after being outlawed for his part in a private war with Sempringham Priory, but eventually received a royal pardon. Birthorpe passed to the Deyncourt family before 1343.
