= Luttrell Psalter =

Manuscript

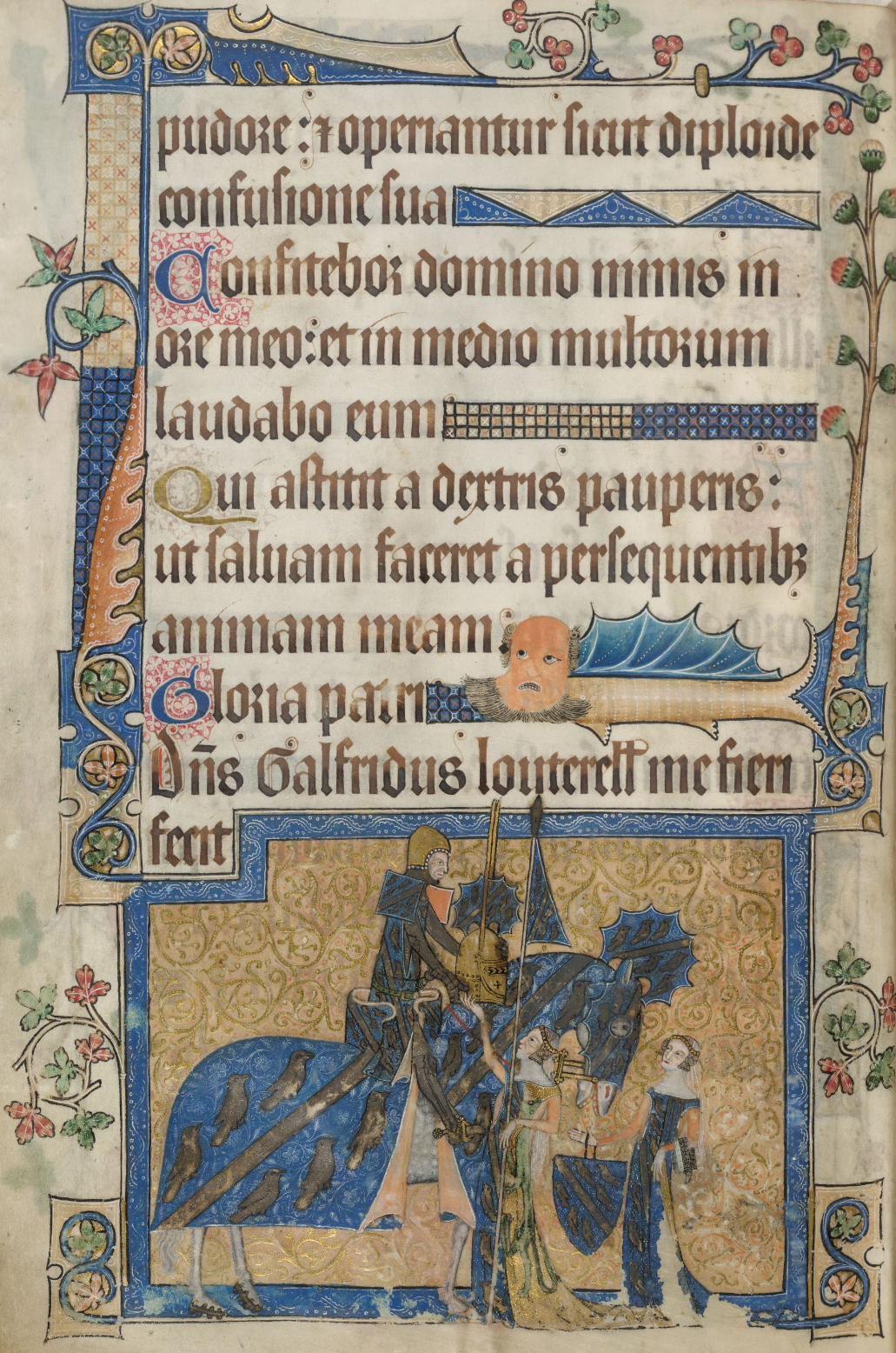
Sir Geoffrey Luttrell, mounted, being assisted by his wife and daughter-in-law. Folio 202v.

The Luttrell Psalter (British Library, Add MS 42130) is an illuminated psalter commissioned by Sir Geoffrey Luttrell (1276–1345), lord of the manor of Irnham in Lincolnshire, written and illustrated on parchment circa 1320–1340 in England by anonymous scribes and artists.

Along with the psalms (beginning on folio 13 r.), the Luttrell Psalter contains a calendar (1 r.), canticles (259 v.), the Mass (283 v.) and an antiphon for the dead (295 r.). The pages vary in their degree of illumination, but many are richly covered with both decorated text and marginal pictures of saints and Bible stories, and scenes of rural life. It is considered one of the richest sources for visual depictions of everyday rural life in medieval England, even though the last folio is now lost.

The Psalter was acquired by the British Museum in 1929 for £31,500 from Mary Angela Noyes, wife of the poet Alfred Noyes, with the assistance of an interest-free loan from the American millionaire and art collector J. P. Morgan. It is now in the collection of the British Library in London, since the separation of the Library from the British Museum.

== History and authorship ==
The Luttrell Psalter was created in England sometime between 1320 and 1345, having been commissioned by Sir Geoffrey Luttrell (1276–1345), lord of the manor of Irnham in Lincolnshire. The date of its completion has not been established with certainty; different scholars have dated the manuscript to several different time periods. Eric Millar writes that the manuscript was made around 1335–40, before the death of Luttrell's wife, Agnes Sutton, because the illustrations show characteristics of the "late 'decadence' of the Late East Anglian style". Lucy Sandler prefers to date the creation around 1325–30 because the styles are similar to the other manuscripts of that time. Michelle Brown believes it was made and planned much later, around 1330–45.

Luttrell, a wealthy land owner, felt his death was coming and wanted to account for all his actions, as is stated in the colophon of the psalter. The purpose of the manuscript was to help with the provisions for his will, in which Luttrell requested twenty chaplains to recite masses for a five-year period after his death (believed to speed the soul's passage through Purgatory) and clerks to recite the Psalms, and other activities for stated levels of monetary remuneration.

The creation of the Luttrell Psalter might be connected either to the papal dispensation of 1331 which allowed the Luttrell-Sutton marriage or to the coming of age in 1334 of Andrew Luttrell, Sir Geoffrey's son. Such indications are present in the illustrations in the manuscript. The psalter contains a portrait of Luttrell, at the end of Psalm 109, fully armed and mounted on a war-horse, with an extravagant display of the Luttrell arms. The image is believed to have served to emphasise his knightly status during a marriage union of a family member. To assert his role as patron of the work, the line Dominus Galfridus Louterell me fieri fecit ("Lord Geoffrey Luttrell caused me to be made") appears above the portrait. The manuscript contains images of beggars and street performers and grotesques, all symbolizing the chaos and anarchy that was present in mediaeval society and feared by Sir Geoffrey Luttrell and his contemporaries.

The Luttrell Psalter was composed by one scribe and at least five different artists, all of them with slightly different styles. The first Luttrell artist is referred to as "the decorator". He used a linear style of drawing rather than a two-dimensional approach. The second Luttrell artist, "the Colourist", often drew images that were more sculptural and modelled by light and shade. He took more notice of human form and posture in his drawings. The third Luttrell artist, "the Illustrator", favoured a two-dimensional style. The fourth Luttrell artist, "the Luttrell Master", was skilled in rural themes and outlandish grotesques. He also drew the depictions of the Luttrell family. He shows great skill at producing effects of shadow and texture. His technique is very similar to the style used in most of the East Anglian manuscripts of the period.

The manuscript came to public notice in 1794, when miniatures of Sir Geoffrey Luttrell, his wife and daughter-in-law were reproduced along with a summary of the book.

=== Provenance ===
Bookplate in the Luttrell Psalter of Thomas Weld. British Library

The Psalter was long in the possession of the Weld family and was moved with them to Dorset from Britwell in Oxfordshire when Thomas Weld became heir to Lulworth Castle in 1775. It remained in the family until 1929 when Herbert Weld Blundell, then heir to Lulworth, decided to put it up for sale. However, Weld's bid to sell two family heirlooms, the psalter and the Bedford Book of Hours, at Sotheby's came up against a legal obstruction. Three days before the celebrated illuminated manuscripts were due to go under the hammer, it was discovered by British Museum lawyers that they, and all the heirlooms and 'chattels' in Lulworth Castle, were actually the property of Mrs Mary Angela Noyes, née Mayne, then wife of the poet Alfred Noyes, and earlier widow of Richard Shireburn Weld-Blundell, the Lulworth heir who had been killed in 1916. Weld went to court, but his appeal was rejected only a few hours before the sale. The British Museum then purchased both manuscripts from Mrs Noyes with a loan from J. P. Morgan Jr. Later in 1929 Lulworth Castle was badly damaged by fire, and some of the other disputed heirlooms were lost in the fire.

The following is from Dorset Natural History and Archaeological Society Magazine 1906:

The Louterell Psalter, a national relic of priceless value which, while the property of the Weld family [of East Lulworth Dorset], is on loan at the British Museum, from which it had been got down especially for the occasion. The pictorial embellishment of the Psalter shows that the illuminators were artists of vivid perception, strong imaginative faculty, ingenuity and a keen sense of humour, and were closely in touch with the full-bodied homely, racy English life of the period – husbandry, the chase, the use of arms, devotion, domestic, and industrial occupations. The Psalter contains also the Canticles, Te Deum, Athanasian Creed, Litany of the Saints, and Office of the Dead, preceded by a calendar. It is supposed to have been done for Sir Godfrey Louterell, of Irnham, Lincoln, who was born in 1276 and died 1345. On page 202, at the end of Psalm cviii., the last of the Psalms sung at Matins, is the inscription in the same hand as the text: "Dominus Galfirdus Louterell me fieri fecit."

== Description ==
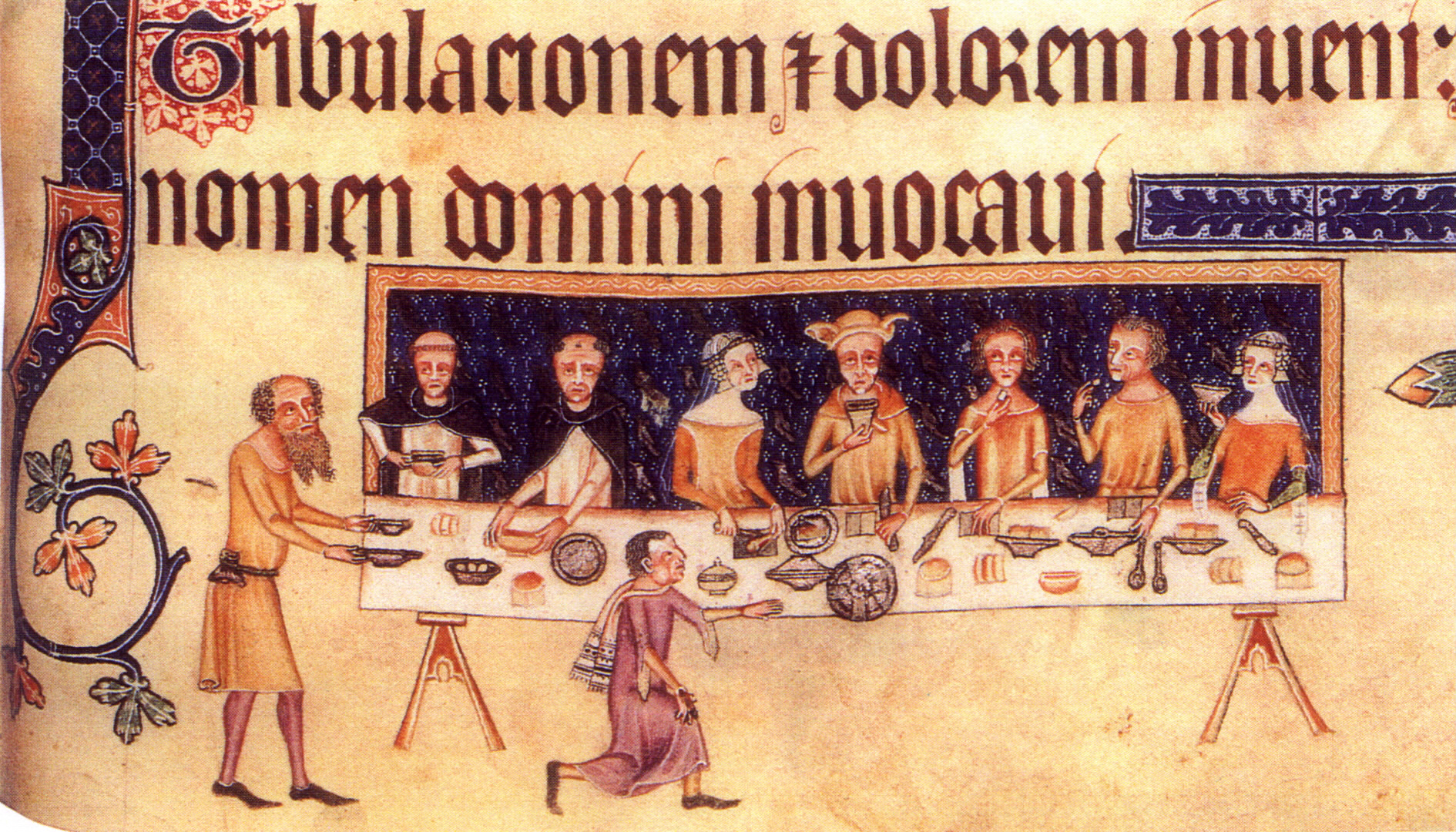
Sir Geoffrey Luttrell at table surrounded by his family and two Dominican friars. Two servants wait on them and others approach the table from the previous page; The tapestry behind has a field azure, semée of martlets argent, elements from the Luttrell coat of arms. Folio 208v.

The Luttrell Psalter measures 350 x 245 mm. It is written in Latin and is composed of 309 high-quality vellum leaves with flyleaves of paper. Most of the pages are decorated in red paint with details in gold, silver and blind. The illustrations are stamped and tooled into the paper. The manuscript has eight cords which attach the pages together securely. It is sewn together and has a modern binding (post 1929) of dark brown Morocco leather. The scribes used ruling as a method of scribing, an expensive method. The scripts are fairly large. Each frame of the manuscript has about fourteen full lines of text. The strokes of the letters are flat and parallel to the writing line. This technique required a pen on which the nib is cut at an especially oblique angle, a "strange pen". Unlike earlier illuminated manuscripts, the first letter of the first word on the line, for approximately every two lines, is capitalized. Its style has many highlights and shadowing on the human figures, and its modelling of the human figure is more pronounced, muscular, and more life-like.

== Iconography ==
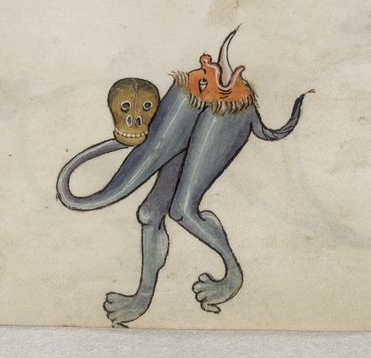
Grotesque creature in the margins. Folio 27r.

The illustrations within the manuscript display several scenes from Geoffrey Luttrell's life, regular daily activities around the town and many different curious figures combining animal and human parts. The Luttrell Psalter was a good illustration of everyday life in the Middle Ages. Aside from the common images of citizens and the Luttrell family, some images remain obscure but others can be related to the text beside which they are painted. It requires, however, the reader to have some understanding of the Latin sacred words. Most of the decorations around the margins are images of pure fantasy, figures of saints, and naturalistic motifs.

Luttrell wanted the drawings to reflect the current devotional, cultural, political, economic and dynastic aspirations that he and his family had. One drawing, for example, shows the remodelling of the Irnham parish church, emphasizing how he was preoccupied with his activities in preparation for his death.

The miniature of Sir Geoffrey Luttrell mounted on the horse wearing full armour beside his wife and daughter-in-law is a very powerful image in the Luttrell Psalter. It suggests that he wanted to be remembered for his youth and for his time spent in the military. The image also shows the Luttrell's family heraldry.

Servants preparing food and running errands are depicted along the margins of the manuscript to emphasize that they played a major role both socially and economically. Images of farming include both men and women to show that during harvest time all available labour was required.

== Music ==
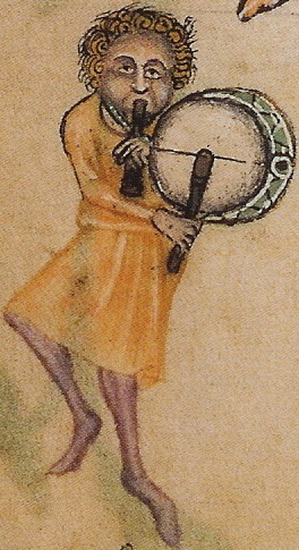
taborer playing the pipe and tabor

Visual depictions of music-making form a large part of the Luttrell Psalter's iconography. People and hybrid creatures are represented singing poems, hymns and psalms as an expression of devotion. The Psalter therefore speaks of an integral aspect of everyday life in the fourteenth century. Music in the Middle Ages was not only used in clerical environments but was also, to some extent, employed to represent the devil and corruption. The Luttrell Psalter is interesting with regard to musical tradition in the Middle Ages because it tries to integrate both the religious and devilish side of the psalter to combine them "into the service of the sacred".
