= Irnham =

Village and civil parish in South Kesteven, Lincolnshire, England

Coordinates: 52.829°N 0.481°W

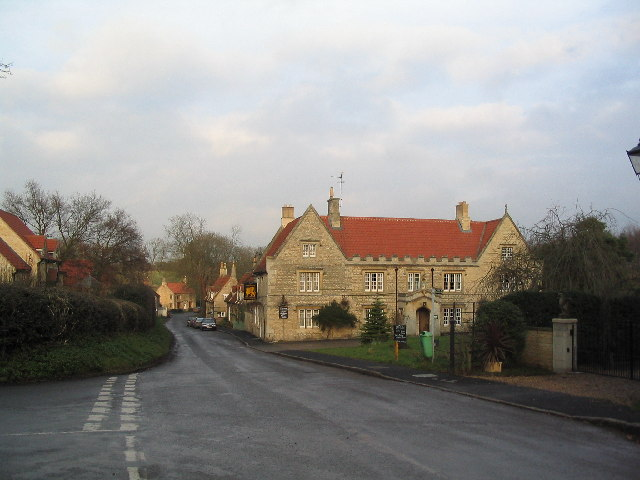
- The Griffin Inn, Irnham

- Location within Lincolnshire
- Population: 206
- OS grid reference: TF024267
  - London: 90 mi (140 km) S
- Civil parish: Irnham
- District: South Kesteven
- Shire county: Lincolnshire
- Region: East Midlands
- Country: England
- Sovereign state: United Kingdom
- Post town: Grantham
- Postcode district: NG33
- Dialling code: 01476
- Police: Lincolnshire
- Fire: Lincolnshire
- Ambulance: East Midlands
- UK Parliament: Rutland and Stamford

Irnham is a village and civil parish in South Kesteven, Lincolnshire, England. It is situated approximately 10 miles (16 km) south-east from Grantham. To the north is Ingoldsby and to the south-west, Corby Glen. The village is on a high limestone ridge that forms part of the Kesteven Uplands.

The civil parish of Irnham includes the hamlets of Bulby and Hawthorpe. The similar extent ecclesiastical parish is Irnham, part of the Beltisloe rural deanery in the Diocese of Lincoln, and part of a Group which includes Corby Glen and Swayfield, sharing a single priest. The parish church is dedicated to St Andrew.

== History ==
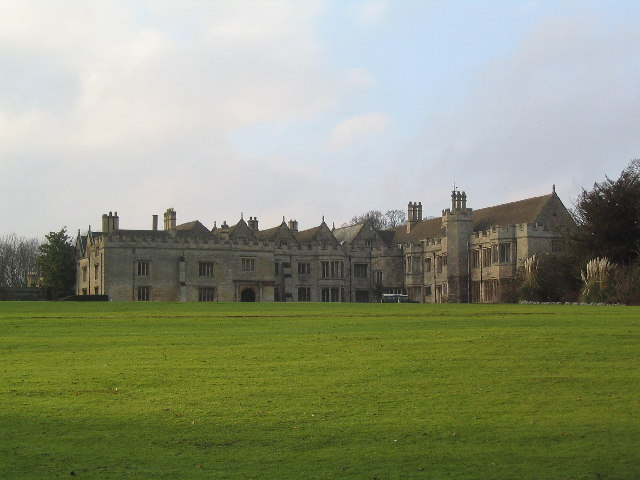
Irnham Hall

Irnham is listed as "Gerneham" in the Domesday Book of 1086. It was probably founded by an Anglo-Saxon thegn named Georna, hence Georna's Ham (or settlement). Scenes of 14th-century life in the village are depicted in the Luttrell Psalter.

=== Irnham Hall ===
Irnham Hall was the ancient seat of the Paynells and from about 1200, the Luttrell family, Lords of Irnham until 1418. The Manor then passed by marriage to the Hilton family and similarly in 1510 to the Thimbleby family, by whom the present Tudor house was built in about 1600. In 1430, Godfrey Hilton, a knight, was residing in "Irenham". Mary Thimelby was born at the hall in about 1618 and became a prioress.

It had several further owners. In 1853 Captain William Hervey Woodhouse (1823-1859) bought the Hall. In 1901 it was purchased by the present owners, the Benton Jones family. A fire in 1887 destroyed much of the interior.

=== Thimblesby's Almshouses ===
The village almshouses, built in 1712, are still in use.

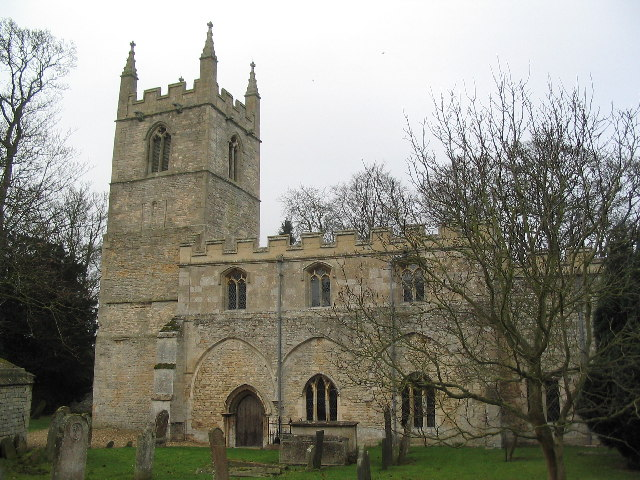
St Andrew's Church, Irnham

=== St Andrew's Church ===
St Andrew's Church is late Norman with Perpendicular additions, and was heavily restored in 1858, and again in 2006. It holds the tomb and Easter Sepulchre of Geoffrey Luttrell, who commissioned the Luttrell Psalter, a celebrated medieval manuscript now in the British Library, in the early 14th century.

== Employment ==
The village public house is the Griffin Inn on Bulby Road. Most other employment is in farming.
