= Winnibriggs and Threo =

Former administrative division in Lincolnshire, England

Winnibriggs and Threo was an anciently established wapentake in the Parts of Kesteven, the south-east division of the English county of Lincolnshire. Most of the administrative functions of the wapentake had been lost to other local units of government by 1832.

== Extent ==
The wapentakes of Winnibriggs and Threo (or Threw) were formed in the early Middle Ages. Both are mentioned in the Domesday Book of 1086. It is unclear when they were merged.

In the 1830s the combined wapentake included part of the town of Grantham, although the "Soke of Grantham" was usually designated separately. Also included were the parishes of Allington (East and West), Barrowby, Boothby Pagnell, Braceby, Colsterworth, Great Ponton, Heydor, Honington, Humby, Little Humby, Little Ponton, North Stoke, Ropsley, Sapperton, Sedgebrook, Somerby, South Stoke, Spittlegate, Stoke, Stroxton, Syston, Welby, Wilsford, Woolsthorpe, and Wyville cum Hungerton.

The area was given as 41,460 acres (16,779 hectares) in 1831, and 31,464 acres in 1851. It is possible that one of these two figures is a misprint. The population was about 3000 in 1198 dwellings in 1831 and 7400 in 2238 dwellings in 1861. A list published in 1809 separates Winnibriggs and Threo from the Soke of Grantham and gives constituent parishes for both.

== External resource ==
Map of the parishes of Winnibriggs and Threo: Retrieved 16 March 2011.
