= Little Ponton =

Village in South Kesteven district of Lincolnshire, England

Coordinates: 52.88125°N 0.62553°W

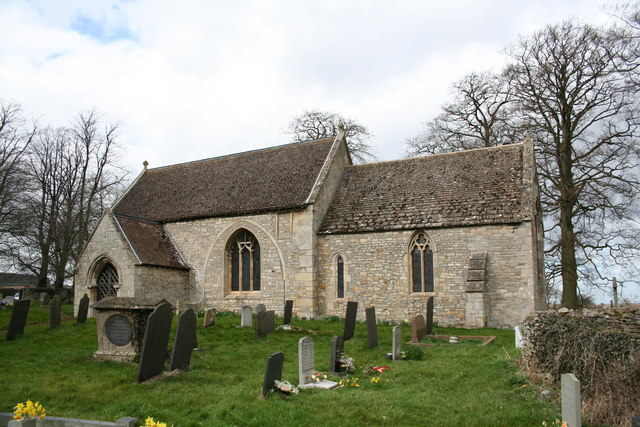
- St Guthlac's Church, Little Ponton

- Location within Lincolnshire
- Population: 135
- OS grid reference: SK925324
  - London: 95 mi (153 km) S
- Civil parish: Little Ponton and Stroxton
- District: South Kesteven
- Shire county: Lincolnshire
- Region: East Midlands
- Country: England
- Sovereign state: United Kingdom
- Post town: GRANTHAM
- Postcode district: NG33
- Dialling code: 01476
- Police: Lincolnshire
- Fire: Lincolnshire
- Ambulance: East Midlands
- UK Parliament: Rutland and Stamford

Little Ponton is a village in the civil parish of Little Ponton and Stroxton, in the South Kesteven district of Lincolnshire, England. It lies 2 miles (3 km) south of Grantham, about 60 metres (200 ft) above sea level.

== History ==
Part of the Roman road of Ermine Street (known locally as the High Dyke) passes through the parish.

The village belonged to the historical wapentake of Winnibriggs and Threo. It was described in John Marius Wilson's Imperial Gazetteer of England and Wales (1870–1872) as "a parish in Grantham district, Lincoln; on Ermine-street, the river Witham, and the Great Northern railway, 1½ miles N of Great Ponton r. station, and 2 S of Grantham. It has a post-office under Grantham. Acres, 1, 490. Real property, £2,590. Pop., 208. Houses, 43. The property belongs to Turnor, Esq. P. Hall was occupied formerly by the Duke of Cleveland, and is occupied now by Broke Turnor, Esq. Many Roman relics have been found. The living is a rectory in the diocese of Lincoln. Value, £400.* Patron, Turnor, Esq. The church is old but good, and has a low tower."

Little Ponton Hall is a Grade II listed building. It dates from 1725 with later additions.

In 1921 the civil parish had a population of 202. On 1 April 1931 the parish was abolished and merged with Stroxton to form "Little Ponton and Stroxton".

=== 1941 Fairey Battle crash ===
On Sunday 18 May 1941 at 2.30am Fairey Battle 'R7363', of 12 FTS, was shot down by Oberleutnant Paul Semrau of 3 NJG, from the Netherlands. There were two RAF aircrew.

- 20 year old instructor Flying Officer Bruce Thomas, of 24 Warwick Park in Tunbridge Wells was killed; he had served over the beaches of Dunkirk in May 1940; he attended Rose Hill School and Cranbrook School, Kent. One of his brothers was a Flight Lieutenant in the RAF, and had another brother in the East Sussex Regiment. He was the son of Major GF Thomas.
- Leading Aircraftman Charles Desmond Kenwrick-Cox (19 June 1922 - 23 February 1943) was injured

Another Fairey Batlle was shot down over Stroxton, a month before. As Flying Officer Kenwrick-Cox, he was killed in Consolidated B-24 Liberator 'AL581' in Burma, aged 20. He attended Bedford School, and his maternal grandfather was Charles Stileman.

== Geography ==
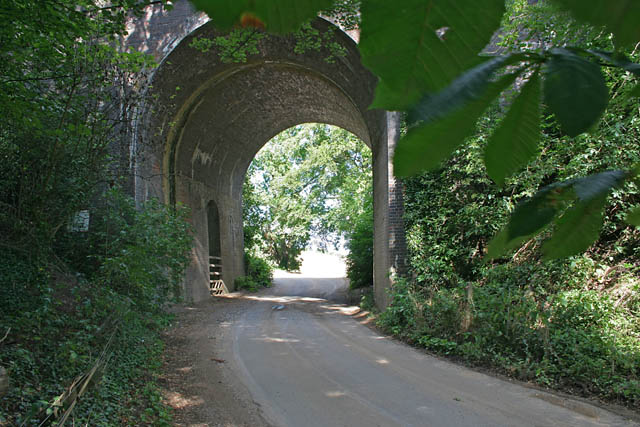
Bridge under the East Coast Main Line on Whalebone Lane

Little Ponton belongs to the civil parish of Little Ponton and Stroxton. It lies just off the B1174 (the former A1). Its ecclesiastical parish follows a footpath across the west side of the A1 as far north as Warren Plantation. The boundary crosses the A1 just before the summit of the hill (as viewed northwards). It follows Tollemache Road South on the industrial estate and the road down to the Saltersford, passing north of Daily Mail Farm, where it meets the parish of Londonthorpe and Harrowby Without. Most of the sewage works is in the parish. The boundary crosses the East Coast Main Line and to the east meets Whalebone Lane, crossing it on the north edge of Whalebone Spinney. Eastwards it crosses the High Dike or Ermine Street (B6403), where it meets the parish of Old Somerby. To the south it includes Woodnook and Woodnook Farm, then follows a footpath south-west through Griff's Plantation. At a point 1 mile (1.6 km) east of the B6403, the boundary meets Boothby Pagnell. South of Poplar Farm and north of Boothby Great Wood, the boundary meets the parish of Great Ponton, then crosses the B6403 next to Ponton Park Wood (east of the B6403). It runs due west to cross the East Coast Main Line north of Great Ponton and then the River Witham, and crosses the A1 to reach Gibbet Hill. At Stroxton Spinney, the boundary crosses the Stroxton–Little Ponton road and follows a footpath.

== Woodnook Valley ==
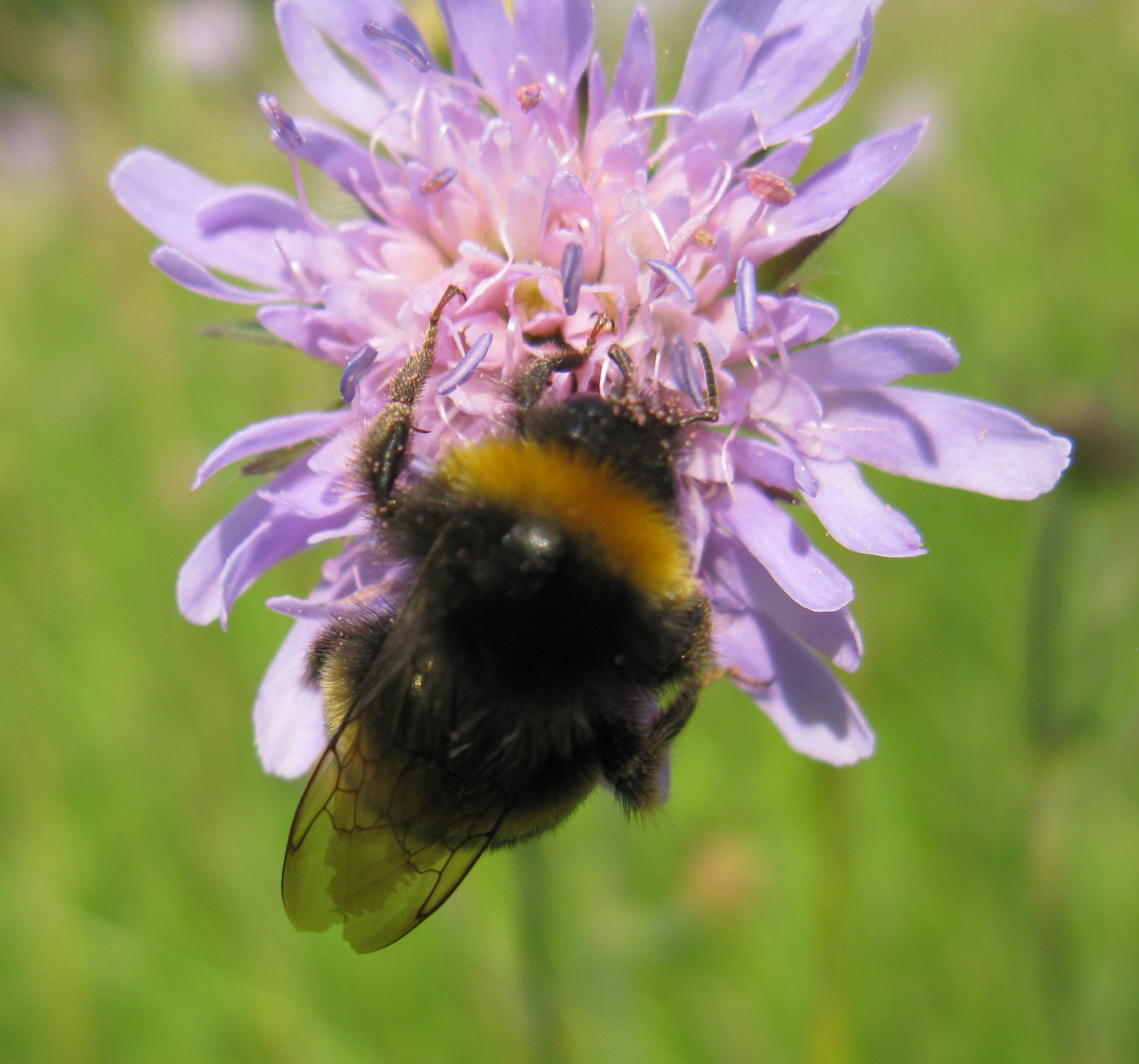
Bombus hortorum on Field Scabious, Woodnook Valley, July 2012

Woodnook Valley has been a Site of Special Scientific Interest since March 1986. It is described by Natural England as "a very good representative example of calcareous [limy] grassland developed on soils derived from Eastern Jurassic Limestone." It consists of two grazed fields, one facing north and the other south. The grasses are generally short and typical limestone herbs can flourish. It supports several species of orchid, including early-purple orchid Orchis mascula, bee orchid Ophrys apifera, and man orchid Aceras anthropophorum (now termed Orchis anthropophora), which at this site is near its northern limits of distribution in Britain.

== Community ==
With Stroxton, the civil parish had a population in 2001 of 135. There are no village amenities.

The ecclesiastical parish is part of the Colsterworth Group of the Deanery of Beltisloe. The 2013 incumbent is Reverend Eric John Lomax. Little Ponton parish church dates from the Norman period, but is largely of Decorated style. The west front was rebuilt in 1657. The chancel arch may be Saxon. The dedication is to St Guthlac of Crowland (674–715), a hermit who gained popularity as a saint in the Fens of Eastern England.

== Notable residents ==
- Richard Todd (1919–2009), 20th century actor, lived in the village. His grave is in St Guthlac's churchyard.
