= Ancaster (Roman town) =

Coordinates: 52.983°N 0.534°W

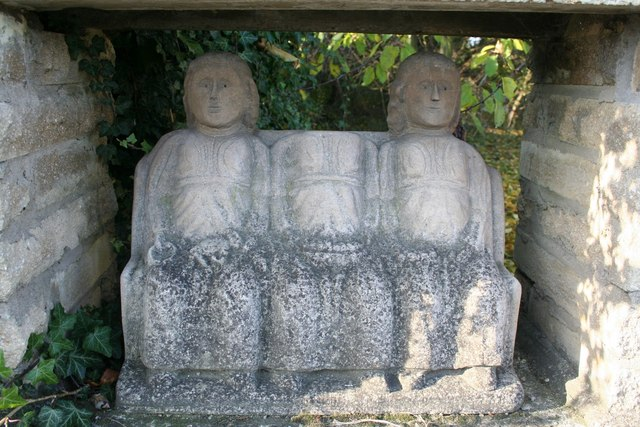
Replica of The Three Mother Goddesses (Deae Matres) sculpture set in the wall of St Martin's church.

Ancaster was a small town in the Roman province of Britannia. It is sited on the Roman road known as the Ermine Street and is situated in the county of Lincolnshire. Its name in Latin is unknown, although it has traditionally been identified with Causennis or Causennæ, a name which occurs as a town on the route of Iter V recorded in the Antonine Itinerary. Rivet and Smith questioned this identification in 1979, and suggested that a more likely identification would be either the Roman settlement at Salters ford, near Grantham in Lincolnshire, or at Sapperton in Lincolnshire.

== Town development ==
The Romans built a fort over an Iron Age settlement sometime in the 1st century. It lay on Ermine Street, a major Roman road heading north from Londinium (London) and, after the army left, expanded rapidly in the early 2nd century into a small town. A defensive stone wall was built about 225 and external towers were later added. Not much is known about life in the town, but industry included pottery production and coin forgery. There may have been a sculptor's workshop as some fine carvings have been discovered. This includes a Deae Matres sculpture and altar from a religious precinct around the present church. Excavations have also found a cemetery containing more than 250 Roman burials, including 11 stone sarcophagi. There is also a Roman marching camp to the north-west of Ancaster.

=== Nottingham University ===
Between 1955 and 1971 the University of Nottingham carried out several digs in Ancaster. A publication ‘The Roman Town at Ancaster’ by Prof. Malcolm Todd described some of their conclusions. It was jointly published by the Universities of Nottingham and Exeter.

=== Roman Trail ===
In November 1996 a group of residents, parish councillors, church wardens, teachers and the Community Archaeologist created a way marked Roman Trail through the village taking visitors from the site of the Roman Temple ( at the church), to the Marching Camp ( near the station) and the cemetery which was, coincidentally also the Roman cemetery. The trail is accompanied by a booklet ‘Ancaster a Roman Town’ by Jenny Stevens and Henny Shotter. There is a permanent exhibition in the church.

=== Time Team excavation ===
A dig by archaeological television programme Time Team in 2001 revealed a cist burial partly constructed with a re-used inscription to the god Viridios. The dig also uncovered Iron Age to 3rd-century pottery, a 1st-century brooch and some of the Roman town wall.
