= Old Somerby =

Village near Grantham, Lincolnshire, England

Coordinates: 52.889855°N 0.574959°W

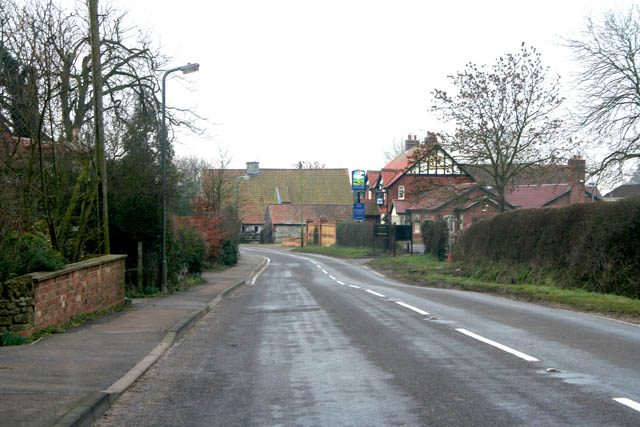
- Old Somerby

- Location within Lincolnshire
- Population: 224 (2011)
- OS grid reference: SK959334
  - London: 95 mi (153 km) S
- District: South Kesteven
- Shire county: Lincolnshire
- Region: East Midlands
- Country: England
- Sovereign state: United Kingdom
- Post town: Grantham
- Postcode district: NG33
- Police: Lincolnshire
- Fire: Lincolnshire
- Ambulance: East Midlands
- UK Parliament: Grantham and Bourne

Old Somerby (pronounced Summerby) is a village and civil parish in the South Kesteven district of Lincolnshire, England, 3 miles (5 km) south-east of Grantham. It lies on the B1176 road, with the village centre about 1 mile (1.6 km) east of its junction with the A52 and B6403, and adjacent to the East Coast Main Line.

== Structure ==
The civil parish population at the 2011 census was 224. Adjacent villages are Ropsley and Boothby Pagnell. The village divides into Old Somerby, High Somerby and Low Somerby.

== Amenities ==
The church parish is part of The North Beltisloe Group of Beltisloe Deanery in the Diocese of Lincoln. Its church in High Somerby is dedicated to St Mary Magdalene, the same dedication as at nearby Bitchfield.

There is bed-and-breakfast accommodation in School Lane. The village public house is the Fox and Hounds in Grantham Road (B1176). Schools, shops and other amenities are available in Grantham (4 miles (6.4 km), to which there are occasional daytime, weekday buses.

== Heritage ==
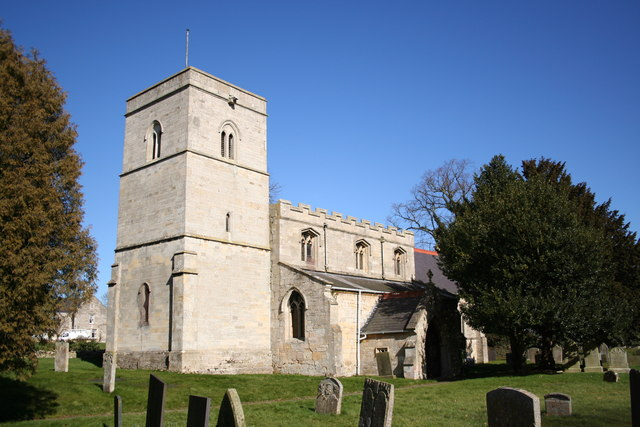
St Mary Magdalene's Church

Somerby was a colony of the Danes who ruled Lincolnshire after peace was made with King Alfred in 878. The village is listed in the Domesday Book, where the King's tenant-in-chief is given as Walter of Aincourt.

The village belonged to the historical wapentake of Winnibriggs and Threo. The population of the 51 houses in 1870–1872 was given as 234.

=== Historic buildings ===
The Church of St Mary Magdalene is Grade II* listed. Initially from the 12th–15th centuries, it underwent alterations and additions in the 18th century and in 1876.

The Old Rectory in School Lane is Grade II listed and dates from about 1700, with alterations and additions in the late 18th, the 19th and the 20th centuries. The other Grade II listed buildings in the village are a barn at the Manor House, the Manor House itself, the stable block at Cold Harbour Farm, and the Old Farm House.

Near the church is the site of a moated manor house.

== Notable people ==
- Edward Weston (1703–1770), didactic writer and politician, purchased the parish of Somerby and lived at Somerby Hall, as did his descendants into the 1930s. His monument remains in the churchyard.
- William Henry Brookfield (1809–1874), formerly inspector of schools and chaplain-in-ordinary to Queen Victoria, became Rector of Somerby-cum-Humby in 1865. Lord Tennyson, a friend, wrote a sonnet in his memory.

== Cold Harbour ==
The hamlet of Cold Harbour stands to the north-west of the village. It is on the road named High Dyke, also spelled High Dike, which follows the line of the Roman road Ermine Street, at the junction where the A52 road between Grantham and Donington joins it. A house at Cold Harbour named Blue Harbour was previously a pub, and the stable block of Cold Harbour Farm is a grade II listed building, dating from the mid 18th century with later additions.

There are several theories on the origin of the settlement name Cold Harbour, which occurs in several places: it may mean a "cold", or no longer inhabited, "harbour" or refuge.
