= Great Ponton =

Village in Lincolnshire, England

Coordinates: 52.8616°N 0.62885°W

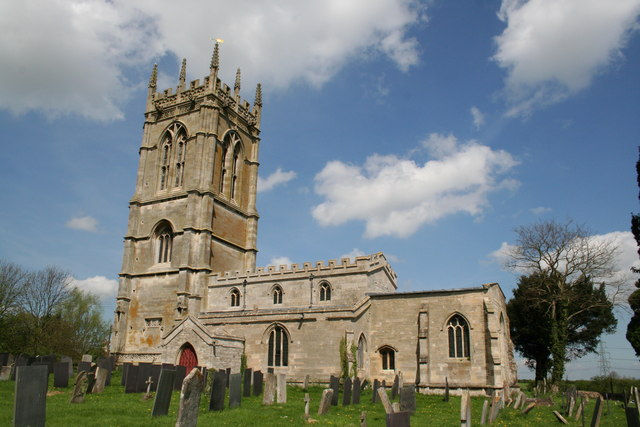
- Church of The Holy Cross, Great Ponton

- Location within Lincolnshire
- Population: 333 2001 census
- OS grid reference: SK924302
  - London: 95 mi (153 km) S
- Civil parish: Great Ponton
- District: South Kesteven
- Shire county: Lincolnshire
- Region: East Midlands
- Country: England
- Sovereign state: United Kingdom
- Post town: GRANTHAM
- Postcode district: NG33
- Dialling code: 01476
- Police: Lincolnshire
- Fire: Lincolnshire
- Ambulance: East Midlands
- UK Parliament: Rutland and Stamford

Great Ponton is an English village and civil parish in the South Kesteven district of Lincolnshire, 3 miles (5 km) south of Grantham on the A1 trunk road, which bisects the village. The tower of the parish church is a roadside landmark. The 2001 census recorded a population of 333, of whom all were of white ethnic origin and 87 per cent described themselves as Christian. The average age was 40. The population of the civil parish had risen to 379 at the 2011 census. It was estimated at 369 in 2019.

== History ==
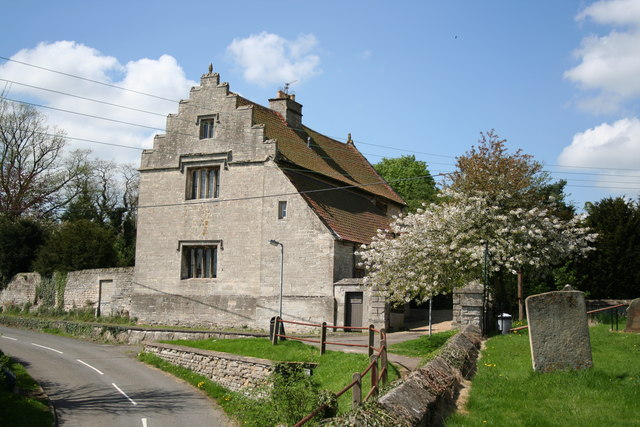
Ellys Manor House, which served as the rectory from 1921 to 1984

The village is named in the Domesday Book of 1086 as Magna Pamptune, probably meaning "farmstead by a hill". Some material remains have been found dating back to the Neolithic age. Remains of a mid-Bronze Age round barrow cemetery were discovered between Great Ponton and Sproxton in 1959. The village belonged to the historical wapentake of Winnibriggs and Threo.

The village church dedicated to the Holy Cross dates from the 13th century. Its pinnacled tower was added in 1519 at the expense of Anthony Ellys, a wool merchant of Ellys Manor House, which is open to the public. The church weather vane depicts a gilded fiddle. The educationalist and school textbook writer Charles Hoole was briefly rector from 1642. Joshua William Brooks, who had been responsible while vicar of St Mary's Church, Nottingham for founding six new churches there, was rector in Great Ponton in 1864–1882.

The Grade I church is among nine listed buildings in the village, six of them residential.

Great Ponton railway station opened in 1853 and closed for passengers on 15 September 1958.

Great Ponton has a limestone quarry.

== Geography ==
Great Ponton is bisected by the A1 about 3 miles (5 km) south of Grantham. A footbridge gives pedestrian access between the west and the east of the village. Further east is the River Witham and the East Coast Main Line.

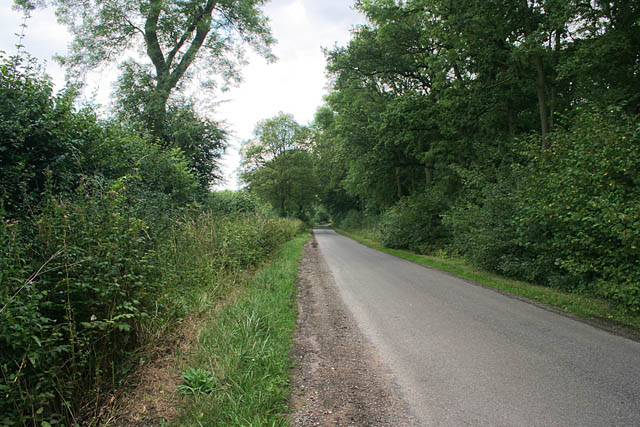
Looking east along Ponton Road near Boothby Pagnell, with Bassingthorpe New Plantation to the right

Nearby villages include Stoke Rochford, Stroxton and Little Ponton. To the north is the parish of Little Ponton and Stroxton, and the parish boundary crosses the A1 at 200 metres (220 yards) south of the electricity pylons, opposite Gibbet Hill, to the west. Due east, it crosses Ermine Street (B6403) south of Ponton Park Wood. It meets Boothby Pagnell west of Boothby Great Wood, and the boundary skirts the wood's western edge. East of Ponton Great Wood, on the road to Boothby Pagnell, it meets Bitchfield and Bassingthorpe, with the boundary following the road westwards, to the north of Bassingthorpe New Plantation.

The boundary follows the western side of the plantation southwards to the Bassingthorpe road, west of Stoke Tunnel Farm, where it meets Stoke Rochford. It follows the road, south of Pasture Farm, to the west of the East Coast Main Line road bridge, and from the bridge runs due west to the A1 at North Lodge Plantation, and meets Cringle Brook, which meanders alongside the A1 northwards to the village. The boundary passes to the south of Cindertrack Plantation, and to the north of Halfmoon Plantation, where it meets Wyville cum Hungerton. A half mile north it meets Little Ponton and Stroxton.

The hamlet of High Dyke lies 1 mile (1.6 km) south-east of Great Ponton, where the East Coast Main Line bridges High Dyke, a stretch of Roman road forming part of Ermine Street.

== Community ==
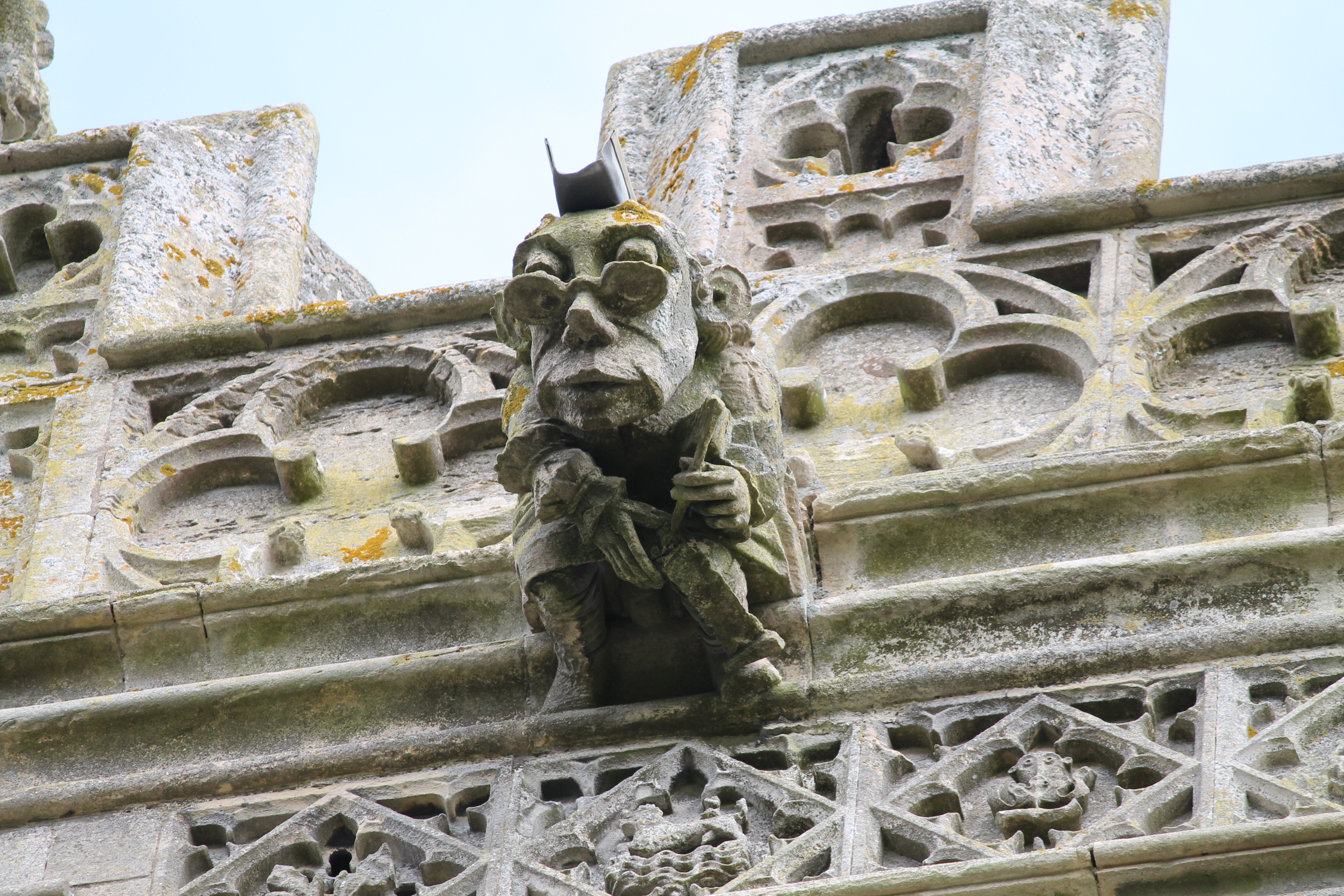
Grotesque with spectacles, Holy Cross church tower

Great Ponton Parish Council meets every two months.

Holy Cross Anglican Church, with St Guthlac's Church at Little Ponton, is in the Colsterworth Group of parishes in the Diocese of Lincoln. The Methodist Dallygate Chapel, built in 1805, closed for worship in 1975.

Great Ponton Church of England Primary School, is a small rural primary school situated in the village with an intake of 10 per year group. The ages of the children in school range from 4-11 years of age. The school occupies a premises in Mill Lane overlooking the countryside. The school benefits from large expansive grounds including a variety of equipment and facilities such as astroturf play area, separate sports and football field, book nook reading shed and climbing equipment. Serving to educate the children of Great Ponton Village and surrounding areas the school benefits from wraparound childcare and works closely with other local childcare providers. A November 2023 Ofsted inspection rated the school, 'Good' for "overall effectiveness" stating that "This is a small school with a big heart".

Great Ponton Village Centre, on Archers Way, is a community centre for social events and functions. The village playing fields are used by local cricket and football clubs. The Ponton Plod is an annual long-distance walk and run that raises money for charity. It starts and finishes at the Village Centre.

There is a garage-come-shop at Ponton Main Service Station on the north-bound carriageway of the A1. The former Blue Horse public house facing the south-bound carriageway has been converted into flats.

The village has a daytime, weekday bus service to Grantham.
