= High Dyke (road) =

Minor road in Lincolnshire, England

High Dyke is a minor road following a length of the Roman Road Ermine Street in the English county of Lincolnshire, between Woolsthorpe-by-Colsterworth and Ancaster, and onwards nearly to Bracebridge Heath. It is also the name of a small settlement on that road, 1 mile (1.6 km) south-east from Great Ponton, near to the mouth of Stoke Tunnel on the East Coast Main Line. High Dyke is also a name for the general area between Easton and Great Ponton. On the Ordnance Survey 1:25000 sheets it is spelled High Dike.

== Junctions ==
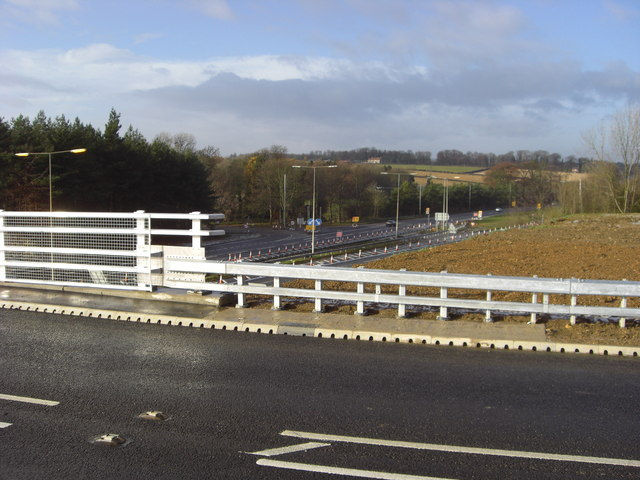
New bridge over the A1 at Woolsthorpe

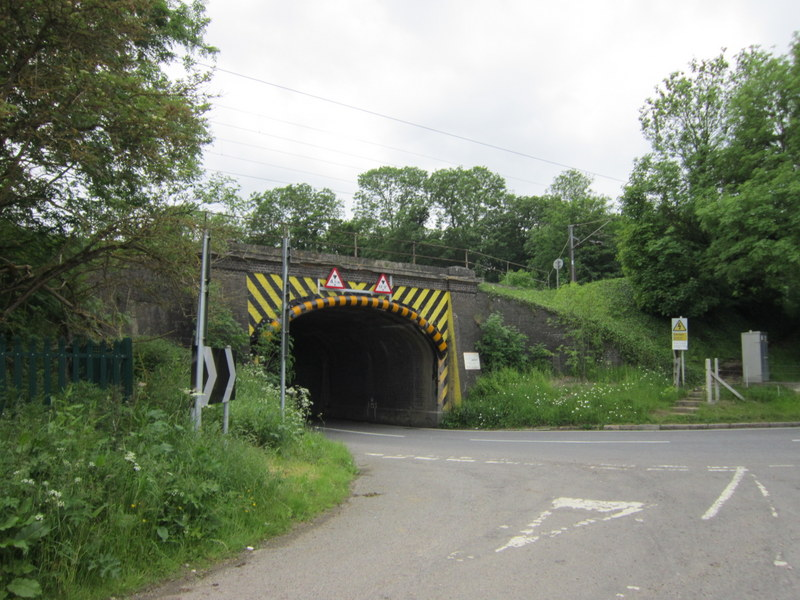
The East Coast Main Line crosses Ermine Street. This is part of the descent from Stoke Tunnel, where Mallard broke the speed record for Steam Locomotives in 1938.

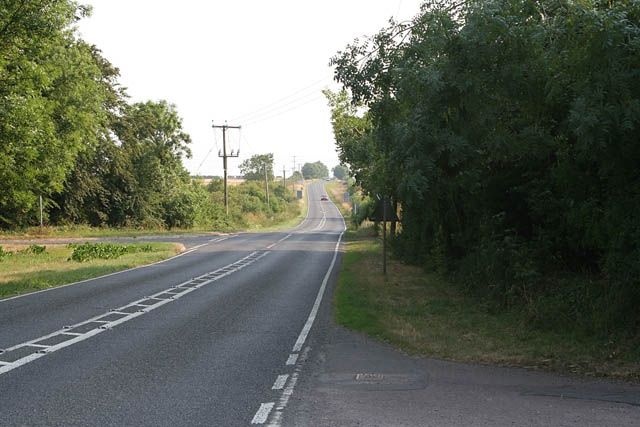
Between Londonthorpe and Welby

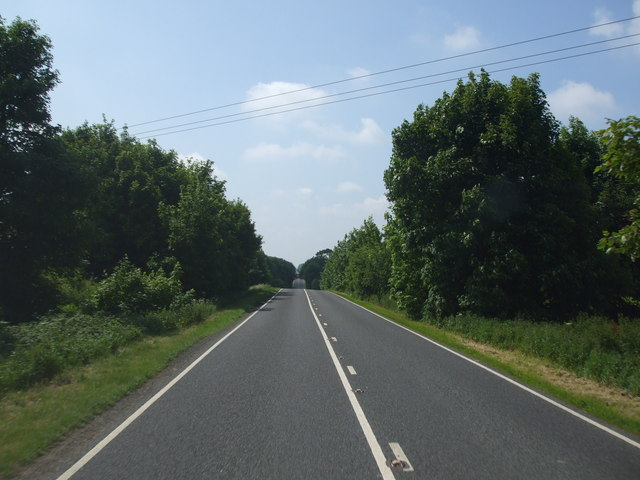
North of Ancaster

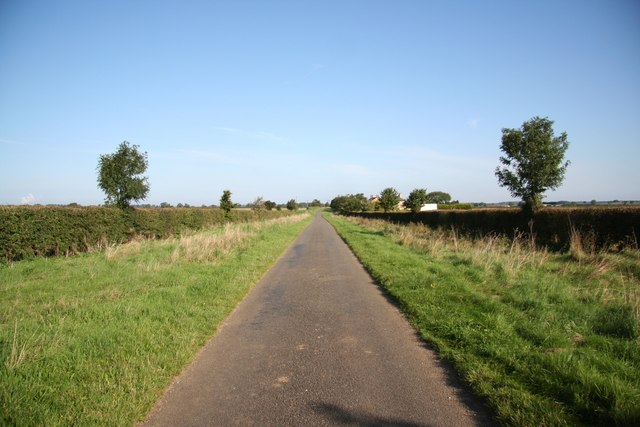
High Dike, the route of Ermine Street, North-East of Boothby Graffoe

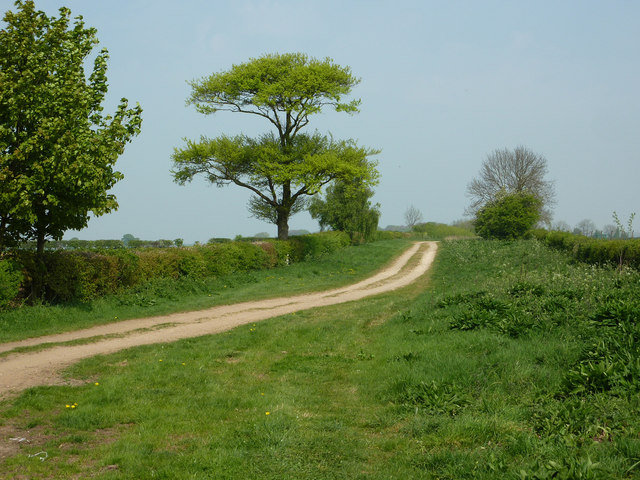
High Dyke on Coleby Heath

Recent rebuilding of the A1 road junction at Woolsthorpe-by-Colsterworth in 2008 has included construction of a grade-separated road crossing in place of the disused railway bridge that was part of the High Dyke branch, a mineral railway used to export iron ore between 1916 and 1973.

There is a roundabout adjacent to Prince William of Gloucester Barracks east of Grantham, but all other junctions are conventional grade-level crossroads or T junctions.

== Route ==
The modern route begins as the B6403 at the grade-separated junction with the A1 at Colsterworth (SK930249). At Easton Farm, it meets the line of Ermine Street from the south (SK937261), and runs north–south. There is a right turn for Burton Coggles to the right, and the 18-acre Easton Cold Store, built in the late 1960s, and run by XPO Logistics, formerly Norbert Dentressangle. When built, and throughout the 1970s it was thought to be the largest cold store in Europe. To the left is a turn for Easton and the Easton Walled Gardens, where the road is at 119 metres high. Further north, past the cold store, the width of the road narrows. The section of road from the A1 was widened and straightened in 1969 when the cold store was built.

There is a left turn for Stoke Rochford. It passes Highdyke Farm to the right, and the road descends and is crossed by a 400 kV overhead line that runs parallel to the East Coast Main Line. At Great Ponton there is a railway bridge for the ECML, at SK939292. There is a left turn before the bridge for Great Ponton, and a right turn after the bridge for Bassingthorpe, near Highdike Cottages. The former High Dyke branch railway ran parallel to the High Dyke from the A1, and joined the East Coast Main Line here. There is a right turn for Boothby Pagnell and a left turn for Great Ponton.

At Little Ponton and Stroxton, SK942317, it passes Ponton Park Wood to the left where the road reaches 118 metres high, and passes through Woodnook, where there is a left turn for Little Ponton. From here to almost Ancaster, the road becomes the boundary of several parishes starting with Londonthorpe and Harrowby Without to the left and Old Somerby to the right. On Spittlegate Heath there is a roundabout at SK948340 where the road briefly becomes the A52. To the west is Grantham (A52), and to the right is Old Somerby (B1176). At Cold Harbour (SK950347), the A52 deviates to the right toward Threekingham, and the High Dyke continues ahead as the B6403. Along an avenue of trees the road becomes the parish boundary of Harrowby Without, and Welby, to the east. At this point the road reaches it highest point of 125 metres at SK956364, meeting Harrowby Lane to the right. There is a left turn for Londonthorpe, and the road gently descends to a right turn for Welby at Pyewipe Cottages.

At Welby Pastures the road becomes the boundary between Syston, to the west, and Welby. The road gently descends and rises up to a left turn for Heath Lane named after Barkston Heath. At this point the road becomes the boundary between South Kesteven and Barkston, to the west, and North Kesteven and Wilsford, to the east. To the left is RAF Barkston Heath. There is a right turn for Wilsford, and the road is the boundary between Ancaster and South Kesteven, to the east, and with North Kesteven. At Duke's Covert (SK979425, 92 m elevation) it meets King Street from Bourne, and the road descends into Ancaster. It crosses the A153 at traffic lights, and passes under the Poacher Line at Ancaster railway station. Ancaster Roman Town, the main Roman town on the High Dyke, is in the south-east of the village. The road climbs out of Ancaster, becoming the South Kesteven and North Kesteven boundary all the way to the A17, with South Rauceby to the east. There is a dip in the road known as The Hollow, at SK986452 where the road crosses a small river at 60 m altitude.

At Sudbrook House it becomes the boundary between Ancaster and North Rauceby, where the road is more north–south aligned, north of Ancaster. There is a right turn for North Rauceby. The Viking Way joins from the east, and follows the road, where the boundary is between Normanton to the west, and North Rauceby. The road levels out at around a height of 85 metres, and passes Ermine Street Farm to the right. There is a staggered junction and the B6403 finishes at the T-junction at Byard's Leap with the A17. The Roman alignment is slightly to the west at SK989494.

The Line of the Roman Road Continues to the North, still labelled both Ermine Street and High Dike on the OS maps, as the route of the Viking Way. It is a footpath until it crosses Long Lane on Leadenham Heath at SK991517, where it becomes a minor road. Close to this crossroads is High Dyke Farm, the spelling in contrast to the Ordnance Survey's use of High Dike throughout the route. It continues northwards across Temple Heath at Temple Bruer and across Wellingore Heath. Just east of Wellingore the alignment turns slightly more to the north at SK994564, and continues past Navenby and Boothby Graffoe to Coleby Mill (SK989600, 75m above sea level). It is maintained, on a variety of road types, across Coleby Heath and Harmston Heath. The track is interrupted by RAF Waddington on Waddington Heath at SK985626. The alignment is still clear, and to the West of the runways it is used as a housing estate road, before losing its identity south of Bracebridge Heath, around SK981652 still at 75 m high.

== See also ==
- Ermine Street
