= Ropsley and Humby =

Civil parish in Lincolnshire, England

Coordinates: 52.90°N 0.49°W

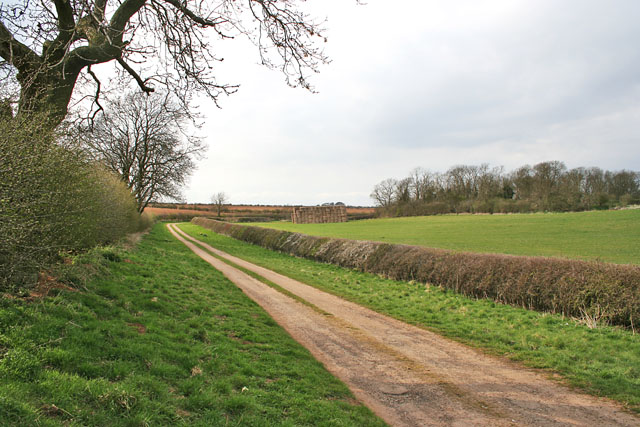
- The long hollow, ancient track, Roman road, and Parish boundary

- Location within Lincolnshire
- Population: 816 (2011 census)
- Civil parish: Ropsley and Humby
- District: South Kesteven
- Shire county: Lincolnshire
- Region: East Midlands
- Country: England
- Sovereign state: United Kingdom

Ropsley and Humby is a civil parish in the South Kesteven district of Lincolnshire, England. According to the 2001 Census it had a population of 808, increasing to 816 at the 2011 census. The parish consists of the small villages of Ropsley and Great Humby and the larger Little Humby, and the Deserted Medieval Villages of Overton Green and Ogarth.

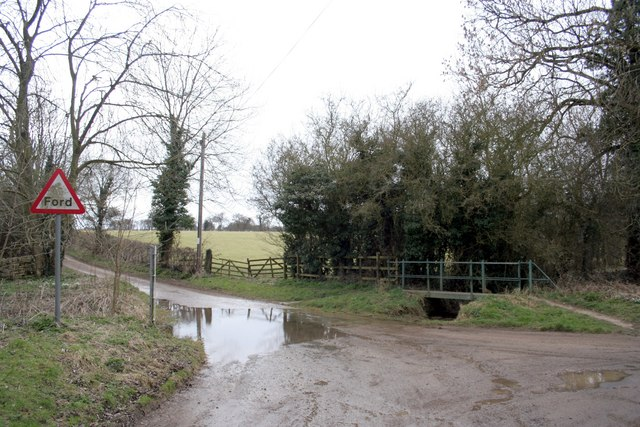
The ford at Little Humby

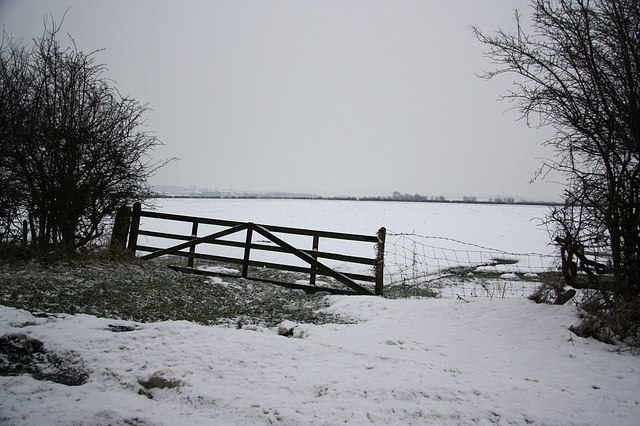
Winter 2009. The parish terrain is like this throughout.

The northern edge of the parish is formed by the A52 Grantham to Boston road, and the eastern edge is largely coincident with the former line of the Roman road King Street between Stainfield and Anacaster. Part of this boundary is the ancient 'long hollow'. The parish is around 100m above sea level on the Lincolnshire limestone hills between Grantham and the Fens. The open country in the north of the parish is known as Ropsley Moor

For the purposes of local democracy, the parish is administered with adjacent Braceby and Sapperton.
