= Braceby =

Small English village in the South Kesteven district of Lincolnshire

Coordinates: 52.906154°N 0.489319°W

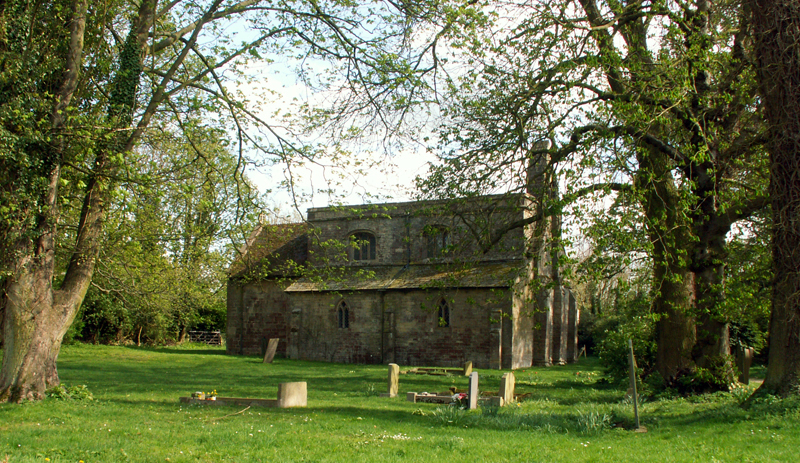
- St Margaret's Church, Braceby

- Location within Lincolnshire
- OS grid reference: TF016354
  - London: 95 mi (153 km) S
- Civil parish: Braceby and Sapperton
- District: South Kesteven
- Shire county: Lincolnshire
- Region: East Midlands
- Country: England
- Sovereign state: United Kingdom
- Post town: SLEAFORD
- Postcode district: NG34
- Dialling code: 01529
- Police: Lincolnshire
- Fire: Lincolnshire
- Ambulance: East Midlands
- UK Parliament: Grantham and Bourne

Braceby is a village in the civil parish of Braceby and Sapperton, in the South Kesteven district of Lincolnshire, England. The village includes a roadside nature reserve sheltering 250 species of plant life.

== Parishes and buildings ==
Braceby lies to the south of the A52 road, about 6 miles (10 km) east of the market town of Grantham. It has a population of 25 individuals. Braceby belonged to the historical wapentake of Winnibriggs and Threo, and within that to the Soke of Grantham.

The church, St Margaret's, dates back to the 13th century, but was restored in the 19th. The ecclesiastical parish is one of seven in the North Beltisloe Group in the Deanery of Beltisloe and the Diocese of Lincoln. From 2006 to 2011 the incumbent was Rev. Richard Ireson. Services at Braceby are held monthly, and at Easter, Harvest time and Christmas.

Many village buildings, especially those dating from the 16th and 17th century, are built in part of limestone quarried in the district, at places such as Ancaster. The population peaked about 1861, when there were 168 inhabitants in 37 houses, but the population declined rapidly. By 1970 it was under 20, but a decision by the local landowners, the Welby family, to sell off empty and unwanted cottages led to some recovery and saved the church from closure.

In 1921 the civil parish had a population of 76. On 1 April 1931 the parish was abolished and merged with Sapperton to form "Braceby and Sapperton".

== Nature and land use ==
The 65 roadside nature reserves maintained by the Lincolnshire Wildlife Trust, under a local-government scheme dating back to 1960, include one that covers both verges of the Braceby–Walcot road south-east of the village. The list of plants found at this reserve runs to 250 species. Notable among them are early purple orchids (Orchis mascula), common orchids (Dactylorhiza fuchsii) and cowslips (primula veris).

Livestock farming (cattle and sheep) in the village has largely given way to arable since the 1970s, but a small amount of permanent grazing remains. Some mixed woodland has also been planted.
