= Braceby and Sapperton =

Civil parish in Lincolnshire, England

Coordinates: 52.90°N 0.49°W

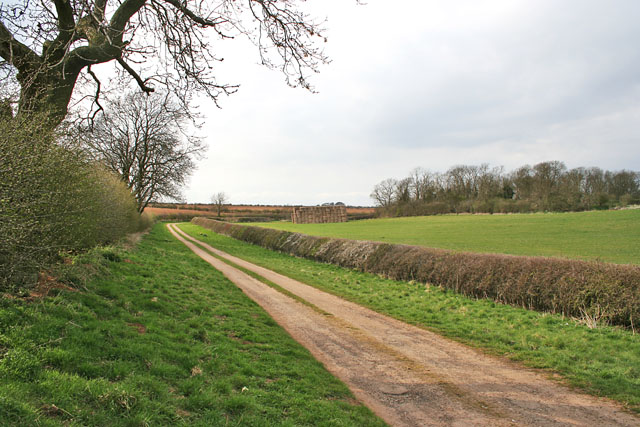
The long hollow, ancient track, Roman road, and Parish boundary

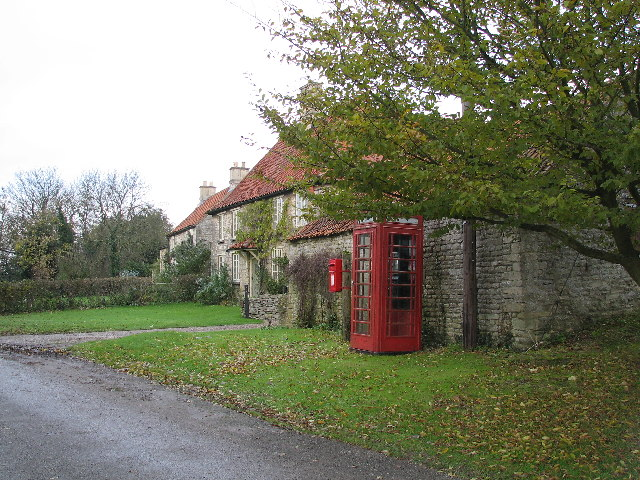
College farm, Braceby

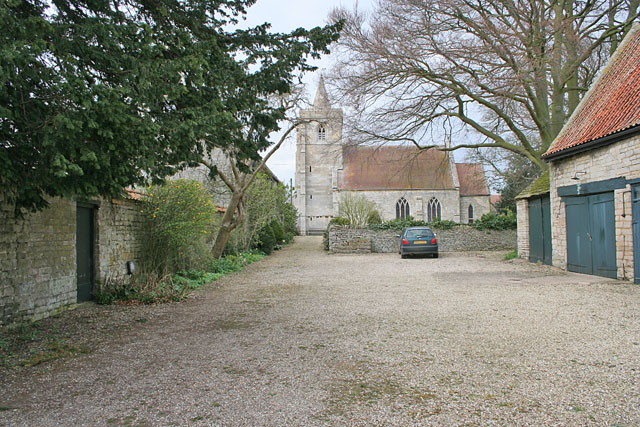
Sapperton church - seen from the Manor

Braceby and Sapperton is a civil parish in the South Kesteven district of Lincolnshire, England. According to the 2001 census it had a population of 47. The parish consists of the two small villages of Braceby and Sapperton. Each village contains a small church dating from the 12th or 13th century.

The northern edge of the parish is formed by the A52 Grantham to Boston road, and the western edge is largely coincident with the former line of the Roman road King Street between Stainfield and Anacaster. Part of this boundary is the ancient 'long hollow', and part the East Glen river. There are small woodlands on the eastern edge of the parish. The parish is around 80m above sea level on the Lincolnshire limestone hills between Grantham and the Fens.

College Farmhouse dates back to 1677.

For the purposes of local democracy, the parish is administered as part of adjacent Ropsley and Humby.
