= Viridia gens =

Ancient Roman family

The gens Viridia was an obscure plebeian family at ancient Rome. Members of this gens are known only from inscriptions, evidently dating to imperial times.

== Origin ==
The nomen Viridius seems to be derived from the Latin viridis, green. Since one of the Viridii left a libationary inscription at Aquae Sulis in Britain, some connection with the obscure British deity Viridios has been suggested, but other Viridii are known from different parts of the Empire.

== Branches and cognomina ==
Too few Viridii are known to tell if they were ever divided into distinct families. Two cognomina appear in extant inscriptions: Firmus, a common surname that translates as "firm, strong, hardy", and Tertulla, a diminutive of Tertia, an old feminine praenomen, which was widely used as a surname throughout Roman history.

== Members ==
- Viridia, named in an inscription from Narbo in Gallia Narbonensis.
- Publius Viridius, named in an inscription Forum Julii in the province of Venetia and Histria, dating to the latter part of the first century AD.
- Quintus Viridius, dedicated a libation to the goddess Sulis, the local genius of Aquae Sulis in Britain.
- Viridius Firmus, named in an inscription from Poetovio in Pannonia Superior, dating to AD 244, and dedicated to Mithras as Sol Invictus.
- Viridia Tertulla, the mother of Albucia Tertulla, buried at Brixia in Venetia and Histria.

== See also ==
- List of Roman gentes

== Bibliography ==
- Theodor Mommsen et alii, Corpus Inscriptionum Latinarum (The Body of Latin Inscriptions, abbreviated CIL), Berlin-Brandenburgische Akademie der Wissenschaften (1853–present).
- René Cagnat et alii, L'Année épigraphique (The Year in Epigraphy, abbreviated AE), Presses Universitaires de France (1888–present).
- George Davis Chase, "The Origin of Roman Praenomina", in Harvard Studies in Classical Philology, vol. VIII, pp. 103–184 (1897).
- John C. Traupman, The New College Latin & English Dictionary, Bantam Books, New York (1995).
