= Viridios =

Celtic god of vegetation, rebirth and agriculture

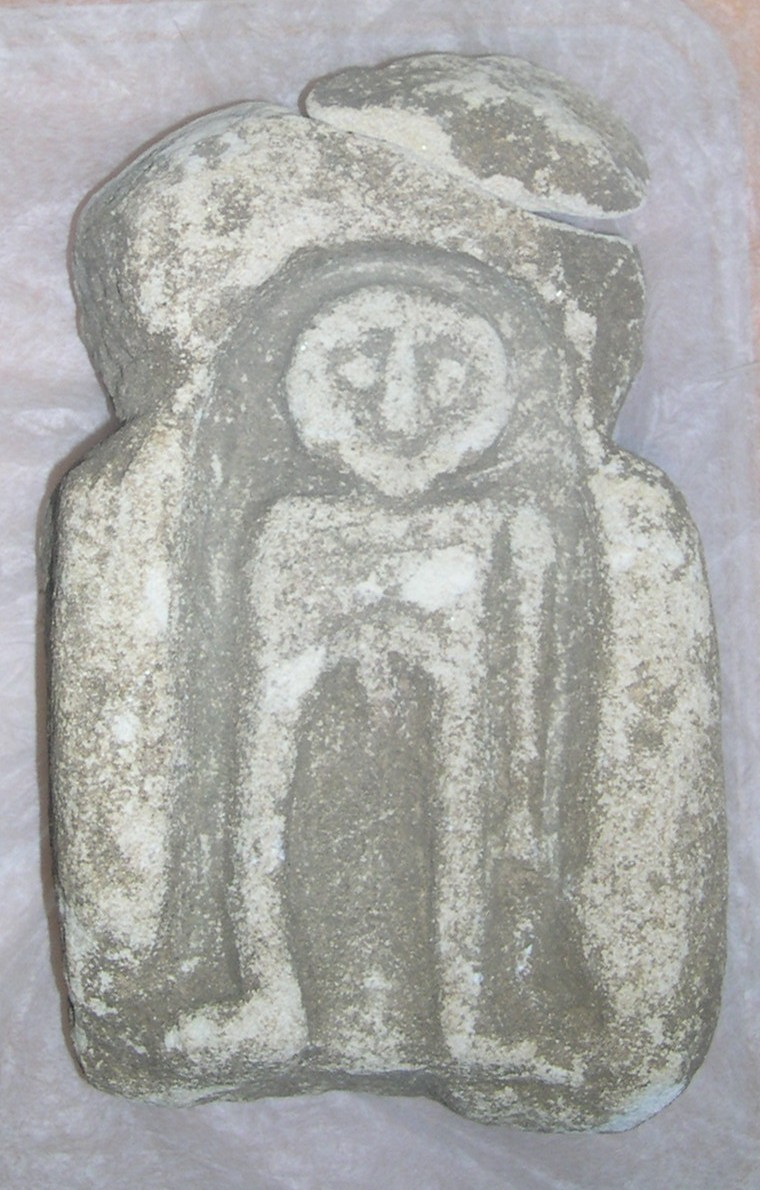
A limestone figurative carving depicting a naked man, from a Romano-British site in Ancaster, conjectured to be Viridios.

Viridios, or Viridius, is a god of ancient Roman Britain.

== Centres of worship ==
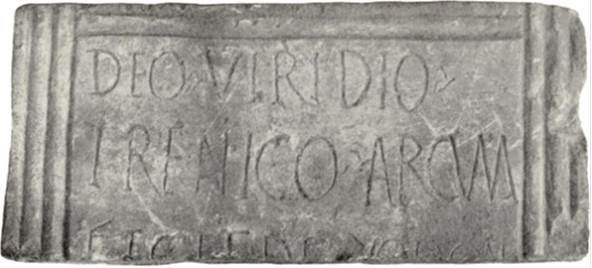
The Ancaster stone found in 1961

Inscribed stones dedicated to Viridios have been recovered in the Romano-British town of Cavsennae or Cavsennis, now Ancaster, Lincolnshire, in England. So far, Ancaster is the only place where inscriptions to this god have been found.

== The Ancaster inscriptions ==
The first inscribed stone was discovered in 1961 in a grave in Ancaster. Wright (1962) reports the find thus:

Ancaster (Causennae), Lincs. (pl. XXVII, 2). Limestone slab, 271 by 12 in., found in 1961 in digging a grave in the new cemetery on the west side of the Roman W ditch (see above, p. 167). The stone had been re-used to form a medieval grave-cover, and in this process the lower moulding and part of 1. 3 had been trimmed off, and on the back the upper and lower edges had been chamfered. As the height of the letters in 1. 2 is 34 in. and substantially exceeds the height of 2–1 in. of 1. i, it seems likely that the text is complete; it reads:

DEO VIRIDIO
TRENICO ARCVM
FECITDESVODON

If the text is complete Trenico must be the dedicator and subject of fecit and don(avit). The god Viridios is unmatched.

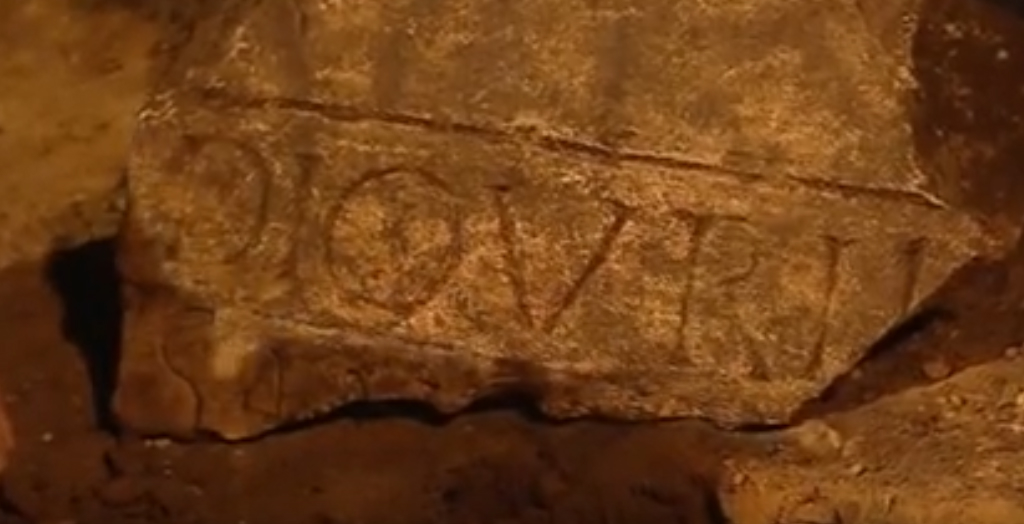
The Time Team stone found in 2001

The Latin inscription may be translated in English as: For the god Viridius, Trenico made this arch, donated from his own funds. This stone is now in The Collection Museum in Lincoln.

A second inscribed stone was discovered in 2001 by British Channel 4 Television's archaeological programme Time Team. The stone was discovered as part of a late Roman or early Sub-Roman cist burial, being used as a side slab in the grave. Located near the grave where the first inscribed stone was found, the inscription on this second stone reads:

DIO VRID
SANCT

which has been interpreted as: To the holy god Viridios.

== Etymology of the name ==
The Ancaster inscriptions are in Latin, suggesting that the name of the god is also in Latin. If so, the name is used in the dative form, meaning to (the deity). The nominative form, and therefore the name of the god, would be Viridius or Viridios. Because of the Latin word viridis ('green', 'fresh', 'vigorous'), the simplest etymology proposed is that the god's name derives from this root word and refers to a local, tribal Roman god possessing these characteristics. The Green Man is a well-known pagan mythic personage whose human face sprouting green leaves or vines is found in some medieval churches.

Significant speculation exists as to the possible Celtic origins of the deity. Wright specifically addresses such speculations, but notes that such a connection cannot be affirmatively made as there are no firm historico-linguistic connections in evidence between the modern conception of Viridios as a Celtic deity and the god Viridios referenced on the inscriptions:

For the stem of Trenico there is a Dobunnian Trenus cited on a diploma (CIL XVI, no. 49). Holder (Altcelt. Sprachsch.) cites nine examples of -ico for men's names. Professor K. Jackson concurs in 'lively', 'vigorous', or 'virile' as the probable translation of Viridios, but says that certainty is unattainable as there are no derivatives in medieval or modern Celtic languages.

== Related archaeological evidence ==
An additional limestone figurative carving, probably used as an altarpiece, was also found near Ancaster and dated to the late Iron Age. The carving depicts a naked man holding an axe, standing beneath an archway. While no inscriptions appear on the stone, the location of the find near Ancaster, and the features displayed on the god that may depict suggested meanings of the name Viridios ('mighty', 'virile', 'verdant', 'fertile'), have led some to speculate that the altarpiece is a depiction of the god Viridios.

== See also ==
- Green Man
- Viridia gens
