= St Mary Magdalene's Church, Old Somerby =

Coordinates: 52.8945°N 0.5673°W

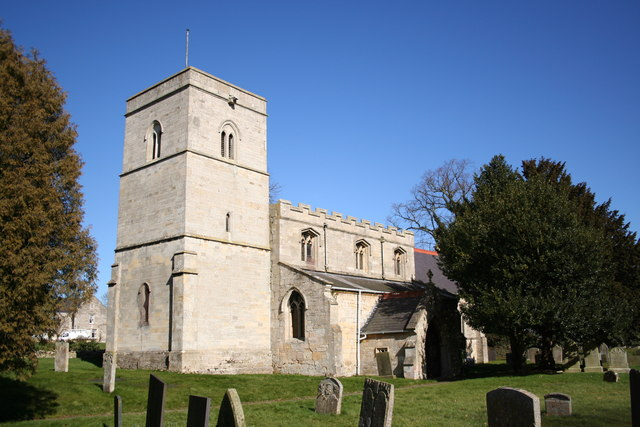

- Location in Lincolnshire
- OS grid reference: SK 96483 33962
- Location: Old Somerby, Lincolnshire
- Country: England
- Denomination: Anglican

History
- Status: Parish church

Architecture
- Functional status: Active
- Heritage designation: Grade II*
- Designated: 20 September 1966
- Architectural type: Church

Administration
- Diocese: Diocese of Lincoln
- Parish: Old Somerby and Great Humby

Clergy
- Vicar: Revd Stephen Buckman

The Church of St Mary Magdalene is a Church of England parish church at Old Somerby in the English county of Lincolnshire. Of 12th century origins with later medieval additions, it was restored in the 18th and 19th centuries. It is a Grade II* listed building.

== History ==
The church stands at the eastern edge of the village, in an area called High Somerby. Its origins are of the 12th century and the chancel arch dates from this period. There are later medieval additions in the Early English Gothic style. The tower was completely rebuilt in the 18th century. A further Victorian restoration took place in 1876.

St Mary Magdalene's is an active parish church in the Diocese of Lincoln.

== Architecture ==
The church is constructed of local limestone rubble and comprises the 18th-century tower, a nave, a south aisle, a chancel, and a porch and vestry. The church fittings include some stained glass and two war memorial plaques commemorating the eight men of the village who died in World War I, and the six killed in World War II. A notable monument is an effigy of the 14th century depicting a knight. At his feet is a carving of his horse. Nicholas Antram, in his revised Lincolnshire volume in the Pevsner Buildings of England series, describes this as "a charming and unusual conceit". (Note: To the right of the knight and his horse is another carving of a kneeling figure, now missing its head. Sources suggest this may be a depiction of the knight's squire or groom.)

St Mary Magdalene's is a Grade II* listed building.

== Gallery ==
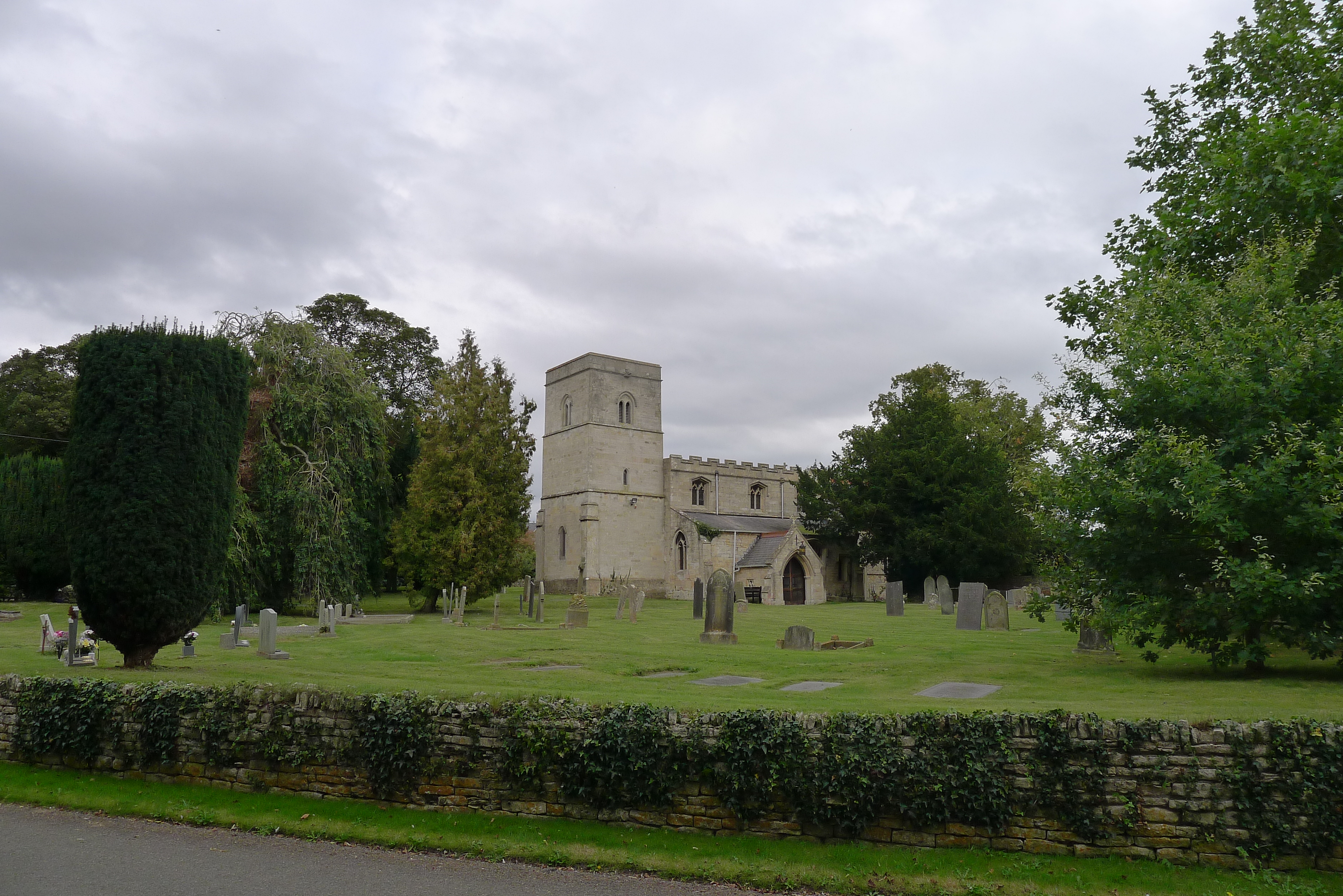
St Mary Magdalene in its churchyard

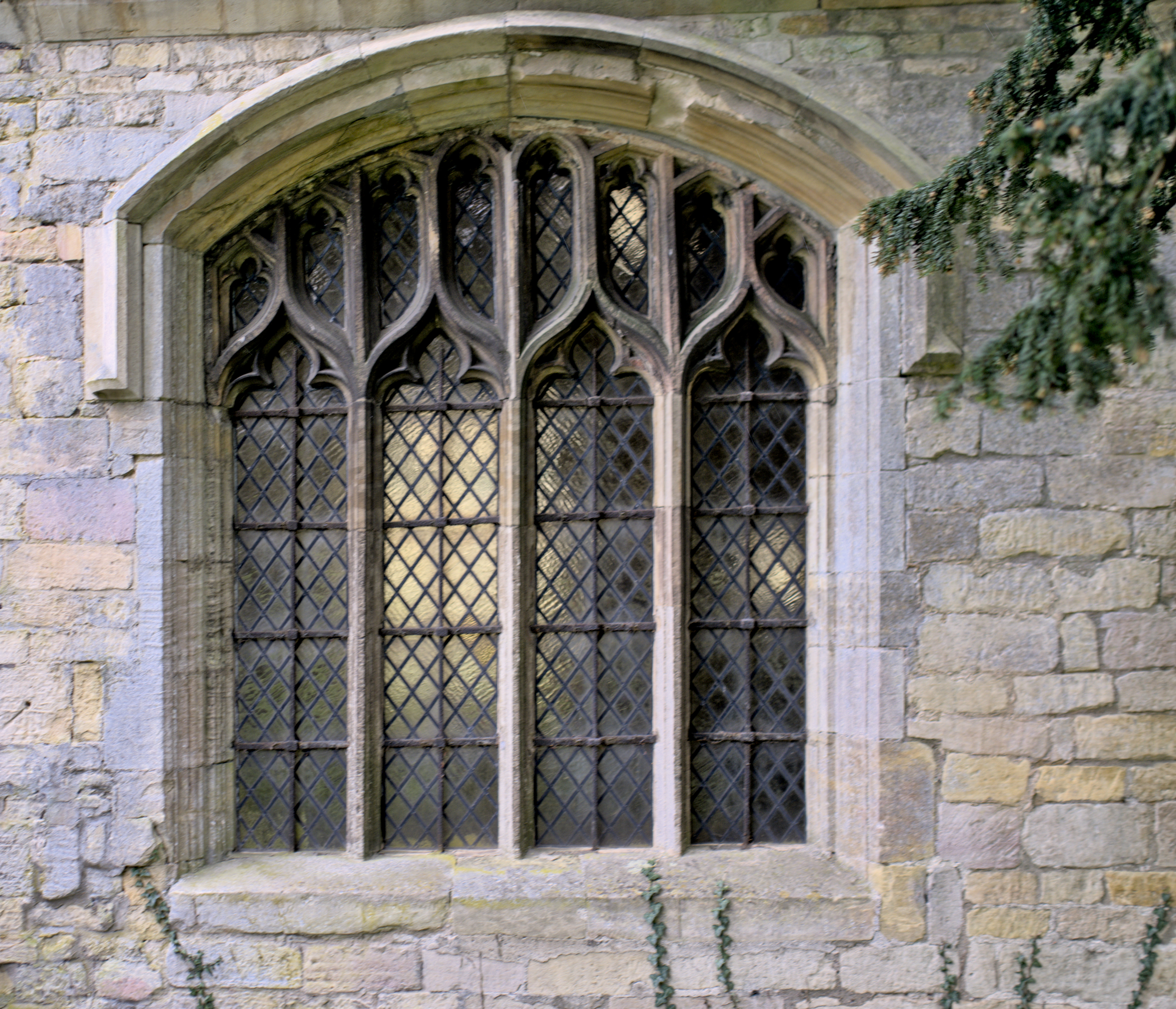
The South window

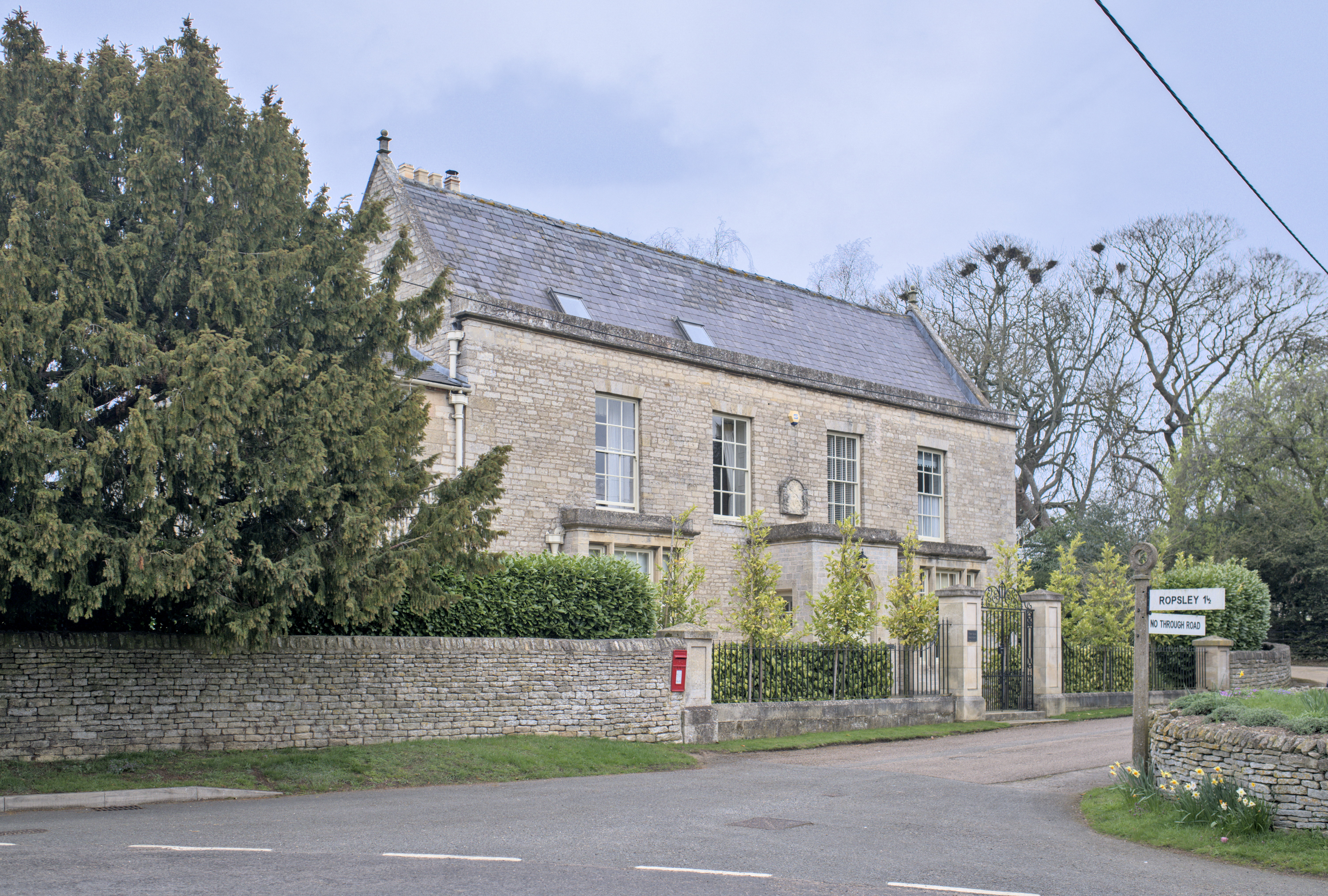
The Old Rectory, a Grade II listed building

== Sources ==
- Pevsner, Nikolaus; Harris, John; Antram, Nicholas (2002). Lincolnshire. The Buildings of England. New Haven, US and London: Yale University Press. ISBN 0-300-09620-8.
