= Little Humby =

Village in Lincolnshire

Coordinates: 52.885°N 0.511°W

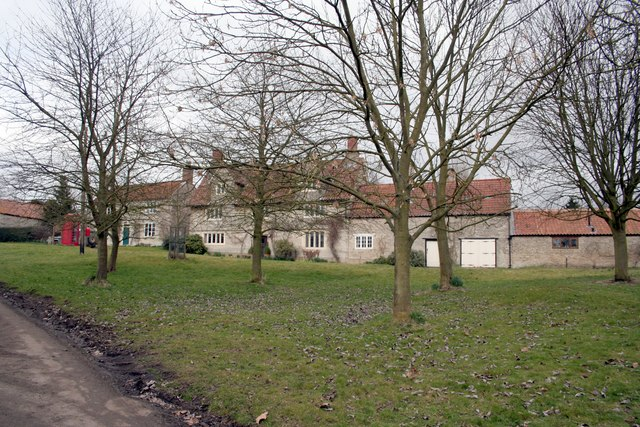
- Little Humby village green

- Location within Lincolnshire
- OS grid reference: TF003330
  - London: 100 mi (160 km) S
- Civil parish: Ropsley and Humby
- District: South Kesteven
- Shire county: Lincolnshire
- Region: East Midlands
- Country: England
- Sovereign state: United Kingdom
- Post town: GRANTHAM
- Postcode district: NG33
- Police: Lincolnshire
- Fire: Lincolnshire
- Ambulance: East Midlands
- UK Parliament: Grantham and Bourne

Little Humby or Humby is a hamlet in the civil parish of Ropsley and Humby, in the South Kesteven district of Lincolnshire, England. It lies 5 miles (8.0 km) east from Grantham, 1 mile (1.6 km) south-east from Ropsley and 1.5 miles (2.4 km) south from the A52 road. Great Humby, a smaller hamlet, is 720 yards (658 m) to the south.

Humby has a ford that is prone to flooding, and a red telephone box. Inhabitants petitioned to keep the box when the local council made plans for a modern replacement.

Local wildlife includes badgers, and birds such as blue tits, wrens, chaffinches, seagulls, kestrels, red kites and buzzards.

Richard Todd, actor, lived and died at Little Humby.

Little Humby was formerly in the parish of Ropsley, in 1866 Little Humby became a separate civil parish, on 24 March 1887 the parish was abolished to form "Humby". In 1881 the parish had a population of 104.
