= Stroxton =

Village in Lincolnshire, England

Coordinates: 52.869875°N 0.655110°W

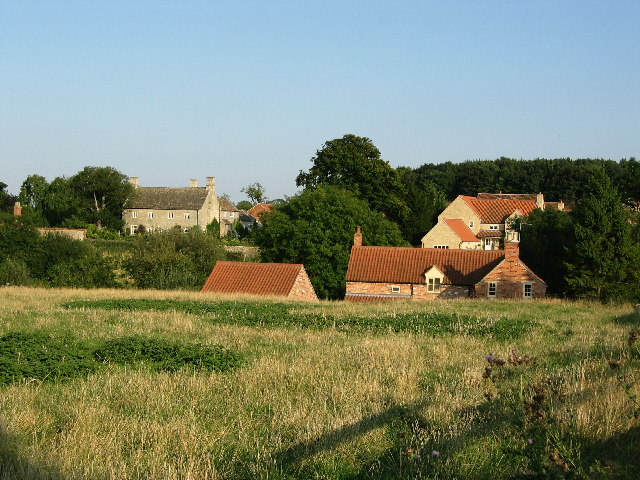
- Stroxton

- Location within Lincolnshire
- OS grid reference: SK904312
  - London: 95 mi (153 km) S
- Civil parish: Little Ponton and Stroxton
- District: South Kesteven
- Shire county: Lincolnshire
- Region: East Midlands
- Country: England
- Sovereign state: United Kingdom
- Post town: GRANTHAM
- Postcode district: NG33
- Dialling code: 01476
- Police: Lincolnshire
- Fire: Lincolnshire
- Ambulance: East Midlands
- UK Parliament: Grantham and Stamford

Stroxton (/ˈstroʊsən/) is a village in the civil parish of Little Ponton and Stroxton, in the South Kesteven district of Lincolnshire, England. It is situated 3 miles (4.8 km) south from the centre of Grantham and about 1 mile (1.6 km) north-west from Great Ponton and the A1 road.

In 1921 the parish had a population of 85. On 1 April 1931 the parish was abolished and merged with Little Ponton to form "Little Ponton and Stroxton".

The village comprises 15 households. The parish church is dedicated to All Saints.

== History ==
=== 1941 Fairey Battle crash ===
On Monday 21 April 1941 at 2.35am, Fairey Battle 'P6674', of 12 FTS, was shot down, with 23 year old instructor Ralph Kilbuern of Coventry, and 19 year old Anthony Foster. It was shot down by Feldwebel Hans Hahn (night fighter pilot) in a Junkers Ju 88 of NJG 3 from Gilze-Rijen Air Base in Netherlands. Another Fairey Battle was shot down over Little Ponton 18 May 1941, around the same time of night. Hahn was later shot down over Grantham in October 1941.
