= Sapperton, Lincolnshire =

Village in the South Kesteven district of Lincolnshire, England

Coordinates: 52.893238°N 0.485774°W

Sapperton
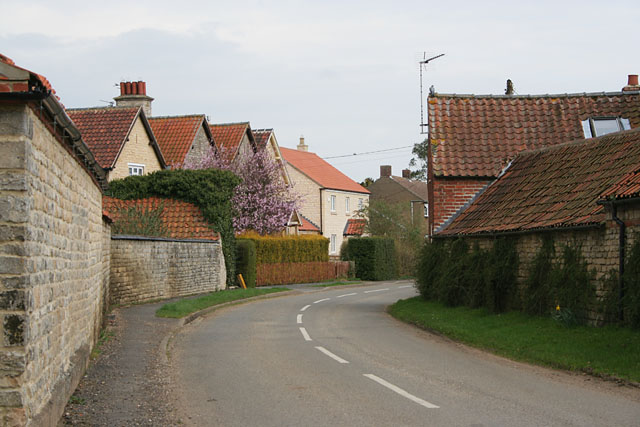
- Sapperton village

- Location within Lincolnshire
- OS grid reference: TF019339
  - London: 100 mi (160 km) S
- Civil parish: Braceby and Sapperton
- District: South Kesteven
- Shire county: Lincolnshire
- Region: East Midlands
- Country: England
- Sovereign state: United Kingdom
- Post town: Sleaford
- Postcode district: NG34
- Police: Lincolnshire
- Fire: Lincolnshire
- Ambulance: East Midlands
- UK Parliament: Grantham and Bourne

Sapperton is a village in the civil parish of Braceby and Sapperton, in the South Kesteven district of Lincolnshire, England. The nearest town is Grantham, 6 miles (9.7 km) to the west. Adjacent villages include Braceby, Pickworth and Ropsley. In 1921 the parish had a population of 46. On 1 April 1931 the parish was abolished and merged with Braceby to form "Braceby and Sapperton".

"Causennis" is a Roman settlement site less than 1 mile (1.6 km) to the south of Sapperton on the East Glenn River, near its source. It was excavated between 1973 and 1981, and again 1984 to 1988, revealing stone buildings, iron-smelting furnaces and various artifacts.

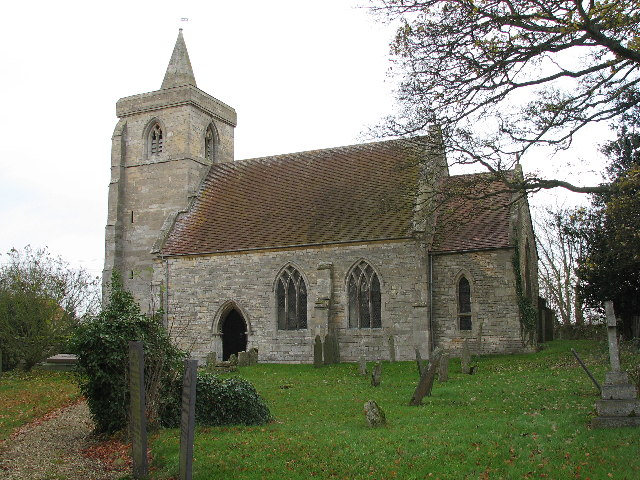
Church of St Nicholas

The Hall is a Grade II listed building and dates possibly from the 16th century, with 17th- and 18th-century alterations, and very minor 19th- and 20th-century alterations.

St Nicholas parish church is Grade II listed and dedicated to Saint Nicholas. It dates from the 12th to the 15th century, with 19th-century alterations. The tower is 13th-century and there is a 12th-century font.

The ecclesiastical parish is part of The North Beltisloe Group of parishes, in the Deanery of Beltisloe in the Diocese of Lincoln. From 2006 to 2011, the incumbent was The Revd Richard Ireson.
