= Little Ponton and Stroxton =

Civil parish in Lincolnshire, England

Coordinates: 52.8768°N 0.6354°W

Little Ponton and Stroxton is a civil parish in the South Kesteven district of Lincolnshire, England. According to the 2001 Census it had a population of 135 across 62 homes, increasing to 235 at the 2011 census.

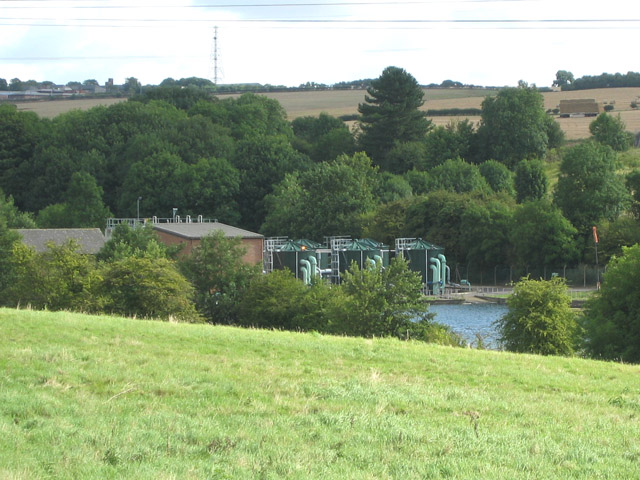
Saltersford

The civil parish contains the villages of Little Ponton and Stroxton, the Nature reserve of Woodnock Valley, The site of a Roman settlement, and part of the Roman road of Ermine Street (known locally as the High Dyke).

== Civil parish ==
The parish was created in 1931 by combining the former civil parishes of Little Ponton and Stroxton.

Local democracy is represented by a parish council, which has been criticised for certain technical failings. A Community Governance Review exploring whether to abolish the council, restore it, or instigate a merger with its neighbour at Great Ponton, was initiated in 2023. Concluding in 2024, 65.9% of Community Governance Review respondents answered that they preferred no change, with 55% of those who wished change backing merger with Great Ponton's parish council.

== History ==
The site of a Roman settlement at Saltersford on the Witham has been identified as the Roman town of Causennae or Causennis mentioned in the Antonine itinerary. Saltersford itself was part of an ancient trading route from Droitwich to the Wash.

Part of the Roman road of Ermine Street (known locally as the High Dyke) passes through the parish.

== Geography ==
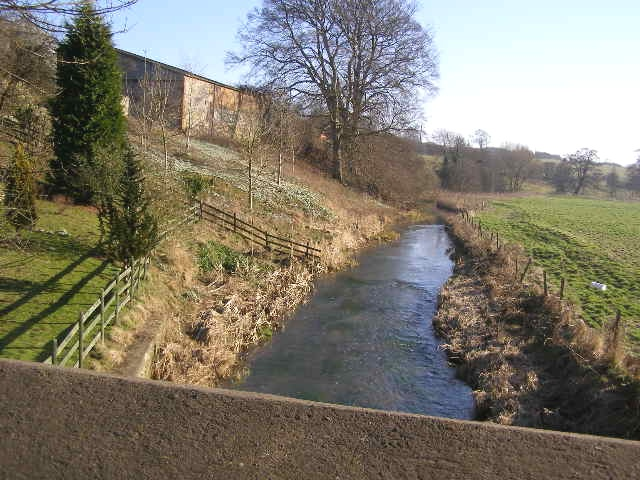
River Witham at Little Ponton

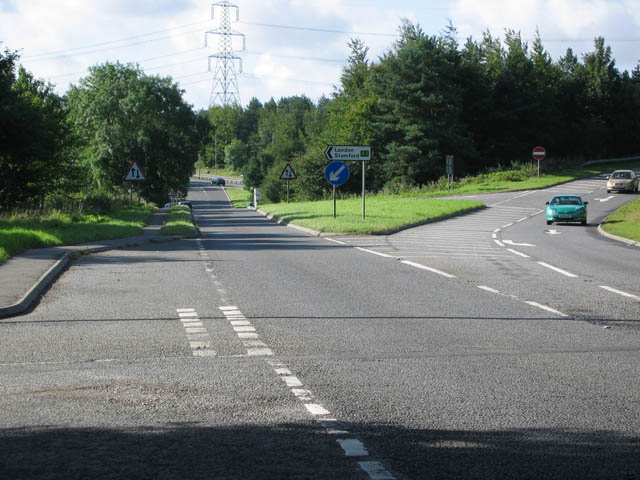
A1 & Great North Road diverge

The parish is bisected by the A1 road, in the south following the path of its predecessor, The Great North Road. At SK921319 they diverge. The new route heads NorthWest as the Grantham Bypass; the older route still runs North into Grantham over Spitalgate Hill, now numbered B1174.

The older Roman road, High Dyke, crosses the eastern end of the parish. The River Witham flows south to north through the parish, and the East Coast Main Line runs parallel to that, slightly more to the east.

Little Ponton, Saltersford and the River Witham are in a valley at around 60 m above sea level. The land to the east of the Witham rises to about 120 m at Poplar farm the edge of the parish. To the west of the river, the land also rises. Sproxton is in the far west of the parish, at 108 m, on Ponton Heath. This basic 'V' shape is further complicated by the Woodnock Valley and the valley of the little stream from Sproxton cut across this landscape, little deep valleys at right angles to the Witham. Outside the villages themselves the land is almost entirely arable. There are small, isolated, wooded coverts, but the only significant woodland is at Ponton Park Wood.

The bedrock of the parish is the Lincolnshire limestone. To the west, on Ponton Heath, the lower series and to the east, around High Dyke, the upper Lincolnshire limestone. The valley of the Witham includes its own alluvial deposits of clay, silt and gravel, and the small elevated platform on which Little Ponton sits is formed of post-glacial sand and gravels. The host of springs around Stroxon are typical of the Lower Lincolnshire limestones.

=== Woodnook Valley ===
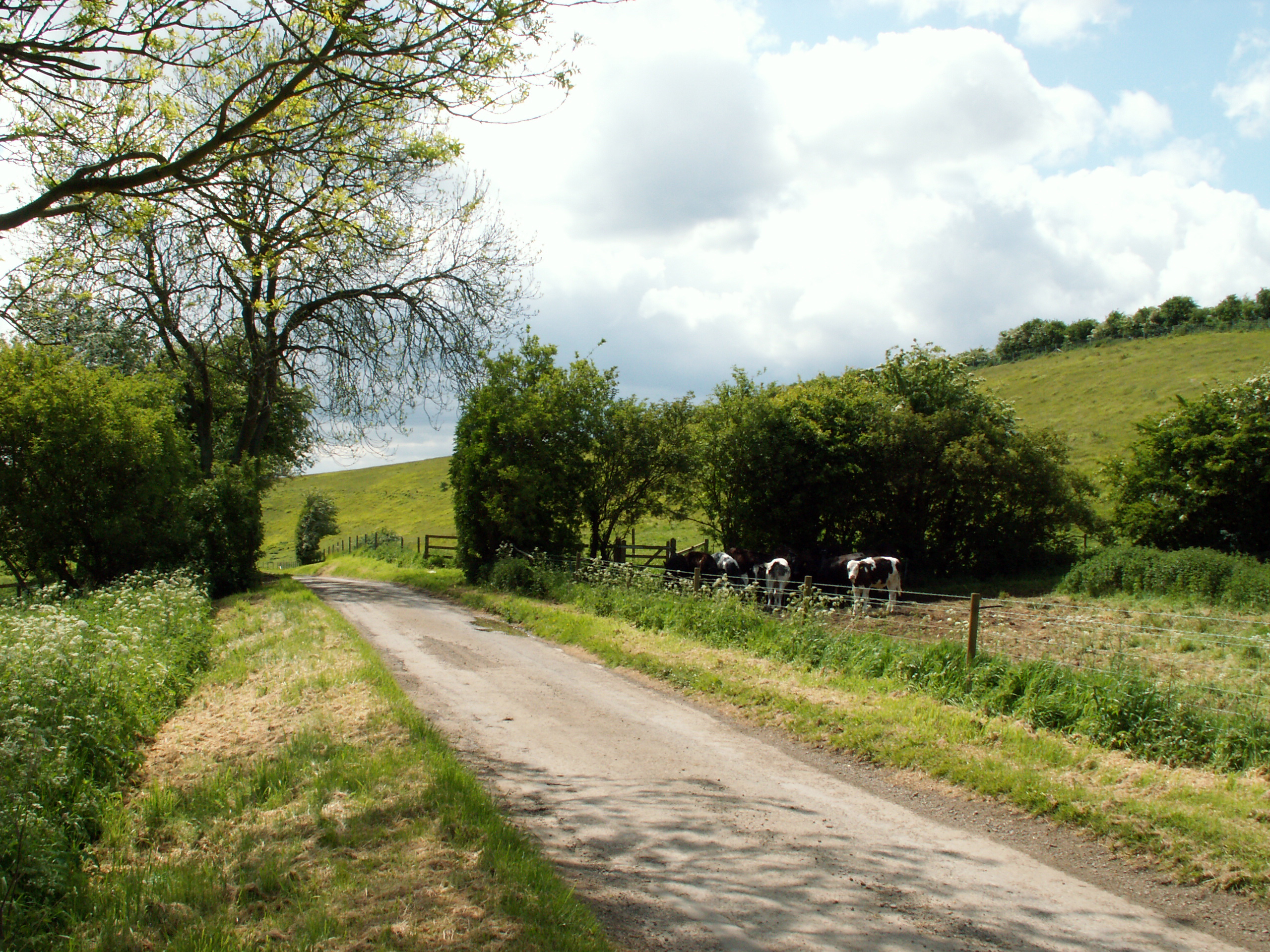
A view west along Woodnook Valley

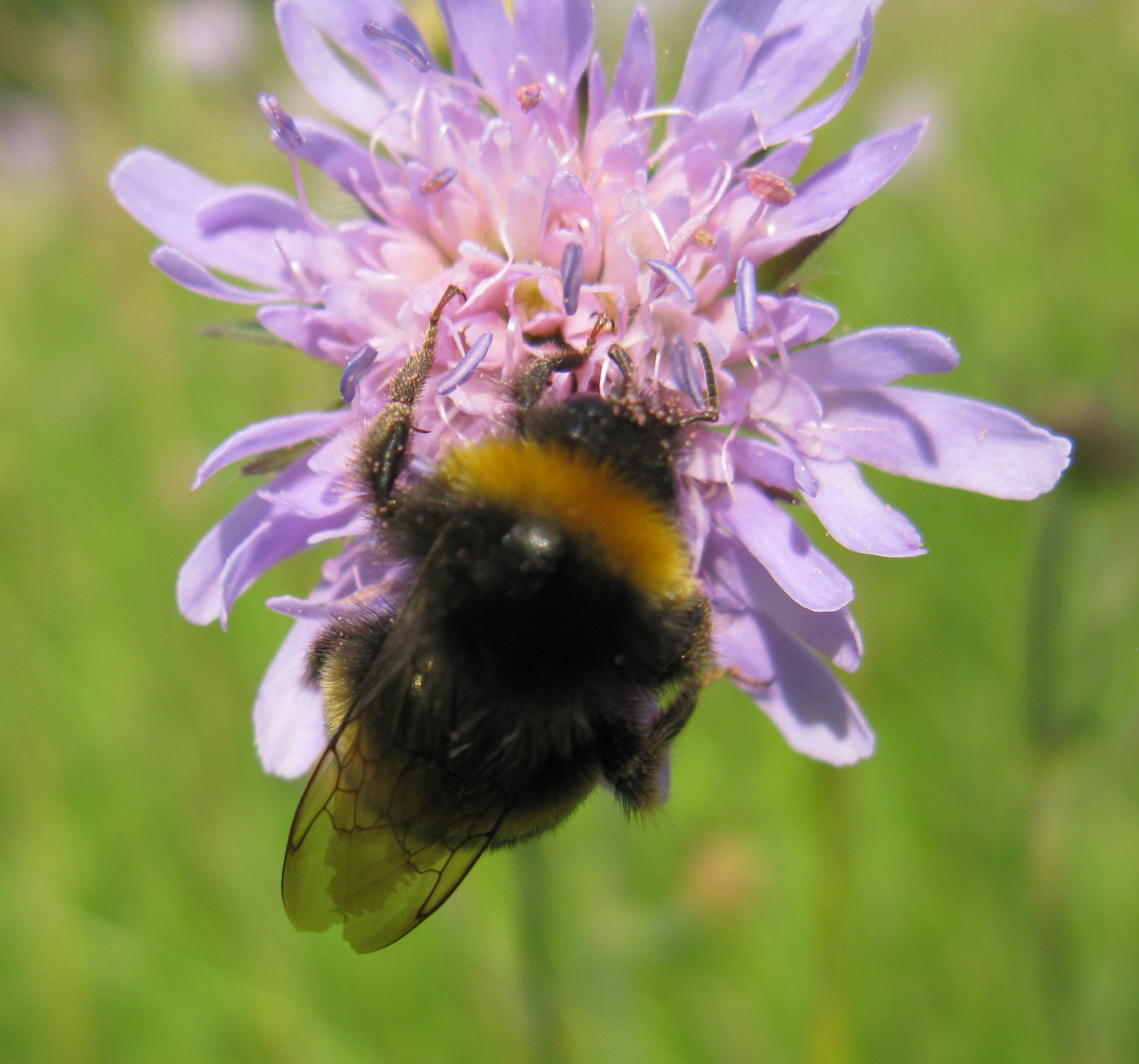
Bombus hortorum on field scabious, Woodnook Valley, July 2012

Woodnook Valley has been a SSSI since March 1986. It is an example of a calcareous grassland. On the site are two types of orchid - the early purple orchid, and the man orchid. There is also the carline thistle, the mouse-ear hawkweed, harebell, glaucous sedge and the common centaury. Insect life is apparent when grassland plants are in flower. Garden bumblebees can be seen on field scabious and lycaenid butterflies typical of this habitat such as the small copper and common blue, and a variety of browns including meadow brown, gatekeeper and ringlet can also be seen. Raptors such as the kestrel, buzzard and red kite also inhabit the area, hunting small rodents and rabbits which inhabit the grassland.
