= Ermine Street =

Roman road from London to York, England

Coordinates: 53.15151°N 0.53454°W

- Old North Road • Roman Road
- Route of Ermine Street

Route information
- Length: 193 mi (311 km)
- Time period: Roman Britain
- Margary number: 2

Major junctions
- From: Londinium (London)
- Durovigutum, Durobrivae, Causennae, Lindum, Petuaria
- To: Eboracum (York)

Location
- Country: United Kingdom

Road network
- Roman roads in Britannia

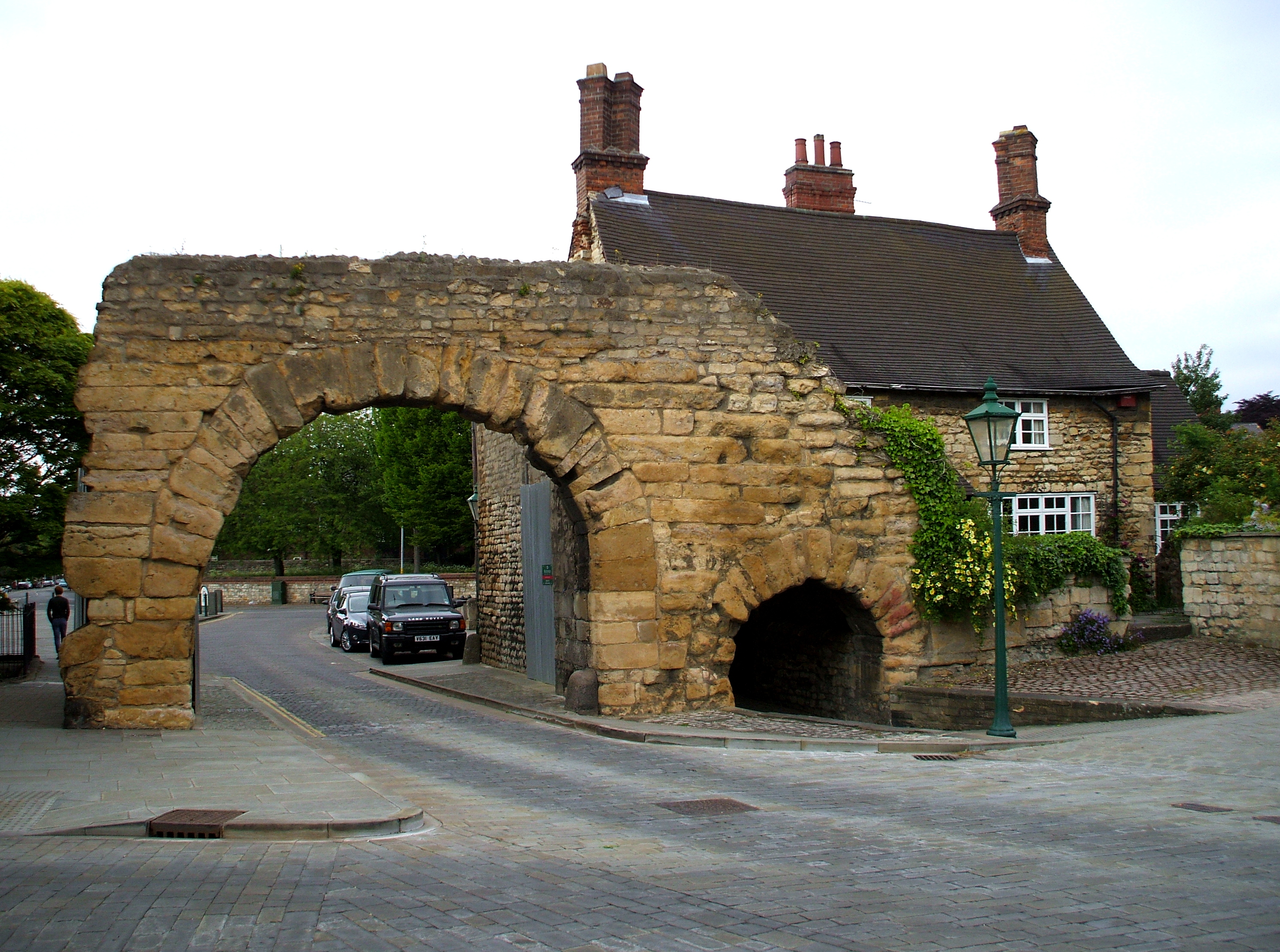
The Roman Newport Arch in Lincoln

Ermine Street is a major Roman road in England that ran from London (Londinium) to Lincoln (Lindum Colonia) and York (Eboracum). The Old English name was Earninga Strǣt (1012), named after a tribe called the Earningas, who inhabited a district later known as Armingford Hundred, around Arrington, Cambridgeshire, and Royston, Hertfordshire. "Armingford", and "Arrington" share the same Old English origin. The original Celtic and Roman names for the route remain unknown. It is also known as the Old North Road from London to where it joins the A1 Great North Road near Godmanchester.

== Course ==
Ermine Street begins at Bishopsgate, where one of the seven gates in the wall surrounding Roman London was located. From here it runs north up Norton Folgate, Shoreditch High Street and Kingsland Road through Stoke Newington (forming Stoke Newington Road and Stoke Newington High Street), Tottenham, Edmonton and eastern Enfield (Ponders End, Enfield Highway, Enfield Wash and Freezy Water) to Royston. This section of Ermine Street from London to Royston is now largely part of the A10. At this point it crosses the Icknield Way. From Royston, it was formerly the A14 to the A1 but now it is the A1198 to Godmanchester (Durovigutum). Ignoring bypasses and modern diversions, the road through Huntingdon to the Alconbury junction on the A1 gives the line. The section from Alconbury to Water Newton, ignoring modern bypasses such as that at Stilton, follows the A1. Ermine street used to pass through Durobrivae, the slight remains of which can be seen to the east, alongside the A1 at Peterborough. The modern road returns to Ermine Street north-west of Stamford, near Great Casterton, through which Ermine Street ran.

The post-Roman road wandered off for two and a half miles (four kilometres) through Colsterworth, but Ermine Street continues as the B6403, through Ancaster to the A17. It then continues as a public right of way, easily walked, until Waddington airfield blocks it at SK981626. The route from Colsterworth, through Ancaster, to Bracebridge Heath is known as High Dike. It runs roughly parallel with and to the east of the A607 between Carlton Scroop and Harmston. High Dike takes to the level, open, dry country of the Lincolnshire Heath while the A607 wanders through the villages on the spring line below. From the Antonine Itinerary there is known to have been a Roman Settlement on the road in South Lincolnshire, called Causennae which has been variously identified with Ancaster Roman Town or Saltersford, south of Grantham.

Another long section remains, now the A15, running north out of Lincoln, past RAF Scampton and Caenby Corner, past Kirton in Lindsey at grid reference SE9698, and continuing almost to the Humber at Winteringham. Before the diversion was made round the extended runway at Scampton, with a very slight diversion at Broughton, it was possible to travel about 33 miles (53 kilometres), from the Newport Arch, the Roman north gate at Lincoln, to the Parish of Winteringham along a road so slightly curved as to be regarded as straight.

Roman Winteringham was the terminal for the ferry to Petuaria (Brough) on the north shore of the Humber. From there, the road curved westwards to York.

This landing place on the south shore of the Humber is significant because Winteringham translates as "the homestead of Winta's people". Apart from Woden, the god, the first leader on Lindsey's list of kings is Winta. Clearly, the end of the Jurassic limestone ridge at the Humber was significant in the English settlement of Lincolnshire. Winterton is a little further inland. Ermine Street and the River Trent together were evidently an important early route of entry into early post-Roman Britain.

== Alternative courses ==
The author Thomas Codrington proposed a more westerly route for "Erming" Street north of London, going via what is now Theobalds Park. This route is marked on many maps.

The Roman Map of Britain above shows a sector of Ermine Street for which there was an alternative route. As Ermine Street extended north out of Lincoln and past Scampton an alternative course of Ermine Street curved left and formed a semicircle on a wide heading west of the Humber Estuary. The straight northerly route, traced in red on the map, between Lincoln and York was the shorter, but was not passable over the Humber Estuary during adverse weather conditions. Thus an alternative route was established (see also Roman roads in Britain). This 'alternative' route is detailed in the Antonine Itinerary and linked York (Eboracum), Castleford (Lagentium), Doncaster (Danum), Littleborough (Agelocum) and Lincoln (Lindum). Beginning at the modern Lincolnshire Showground the portion of this route in Lincolnshire is known as Till Bridge Lane, the modern A1500. The route in the Doncaster area, and again north of Castleford, is known as the Roman Ridge or Roman Rigg.

A large section of this road formed for many later centuries the Great North Road between Nottinghamshire and West Yorkshire.

== See also ==
- Roman Britain
- Roman roads in Britain
