= Ropsley =

Village in the South Kesteven district of Lincolnshire, England

Coordinates: 52.8961°N 0.5268°W

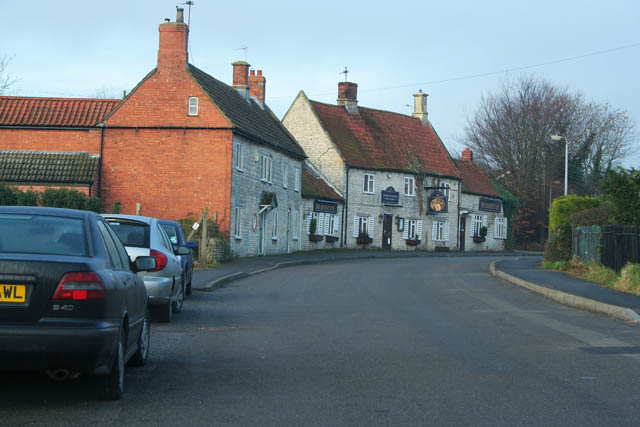
- Ropsley

- Location within Lincolnshire
- OS grid reference: SK992342
  - London: 100 mi (160 km) S
- Civil parish: Ropsley and Humby
- District: South Kesteven
- Shire county: Lincolnshire
- Region: East Midlands
- Country: England
- Sovereign state: United Kingdom
- Post town: GRANTHAM
- Postcode district: NG33
- Police: Lincolnshire
- Fire: Lincolnshire
- Ambulance: East Midlands
- UK Parliament: Grantham and Bourne

Ropsley is a village in the civil parish of Ropsley and Humby, in the South Kesteven district of Lincolnshire, England. The village is situated approximately 5 miles (8 km) east of Grantham.

Ropsley is the location of the source of the River East Glen (River Eden).

== History ==
Ropsley was the birthplace of Richard Foxe, the Tudor bishop who funded the Grammar School at Grantham and Corpus Christi College at Oxford.

A 300-year-old ring dam, 0.5 miles (0.8 km) south-east from the village and identified by a group of trees, was once used as a sheep wash; the blue brickwork of the sheep wash can still be seen. There are paths from the village, past the ring dam, to Little Humby.

There several disused quarries nearby, two of which are situated within the village itself.

On 1 April 1931 the parish was abolished and merged with Humby to form "Ropsley and Humby". At the 1921 census (one of the last before the abolition of the parish), Ropsley had a population of 519.

== Community ==
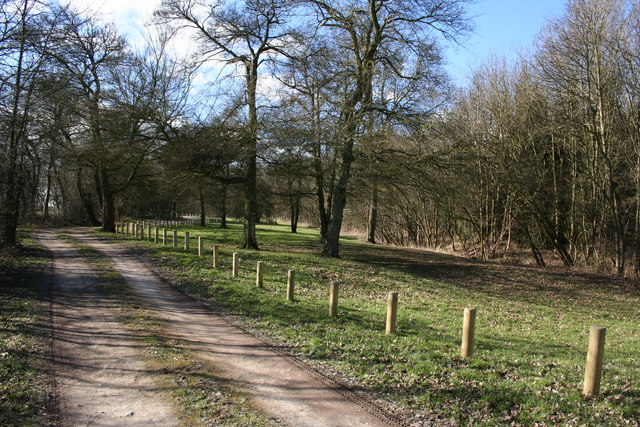
Ropsley Rise Woods; the centre of the woods was thinned in 2008

There is now one village public house: The Green Man, The Ropsley Fox closed down in 2012. Previous pubs included The Peacock. The village bakery was on the high street for 300 years, one of the oldest in the country, closing in 1979. Now a private house, many people can remember visiting the bakery as children to get the family bread and cakes.

Ropsley village hall has grounds which incorporate a basketball court, a football pitch and a cricket pitch. There is a 12-hole golf course on the outskirts of the village. The village running club is Ropsley Road Runners.

Ropsley war memorial is in the centre of the village and dedicated to First and Second World War servicemen. Each year on Remembrance Day a parade, led by a piper, travels from St Peter's Church to the memorial for two minutes silence.

A number of walks in the Ropsley area run through traditional English woodland, including Ropsley Rise Woods.

Previously there were several small farms in the Ropsley area. Today very little of the land is used for livestock; it is almost all arable farmland, growing crops including barley and oil seed rape.

=== St Peter's Church ===
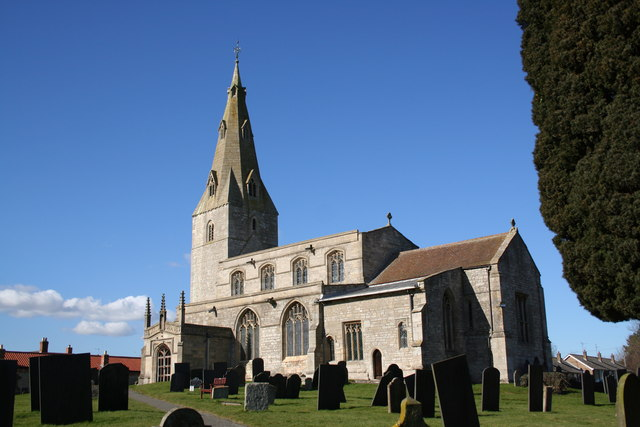
St Peter's Church

The church of St Peter dates back to Norman times. Some parts of the church appear to be of Anglo-Saxon origin. The building dates back to at least 1380. In the 17th century part of the church was demolished and re built by the vicar of the time, Reverend Francis Furlong, because dry rot was discovered in the walls. Two war memorials are inside St Peter's Church: one commemorates War dead, the second, a stained glass window, is a memorial to Sgt Pilot of the Royal Air Force, William Philip Dales from Little Humby.

The ecclesiastical parish is part of The North Beltisloe Group of parishes in the Deanery of Beltisloe in the Diocese of Lincoln. From 2006 to 2011 the incumbent was Rev Richard Ireson and from 2012 Rev Mike Doyle.

== Education ==
The first school was built here in 1717, endowed by James Thompson. It was rebuilt about 1805 after a fire. A Public Elementary School was built here in 1874, and enlarged in 1894 with an increased pupil intake of 400.

Today the school teaches almost 100 pupils. It has its own wildlife area, playground, climbing frame and football pitch, and a bell tower and hall. The school holds a Summer Fete and a Christmas Fayre biannually. Each year at harvest time the school holds a harvest festival; children walk from the school to the church with their offerings. The food collected is then raffled-off.
