= Saint Beccel =

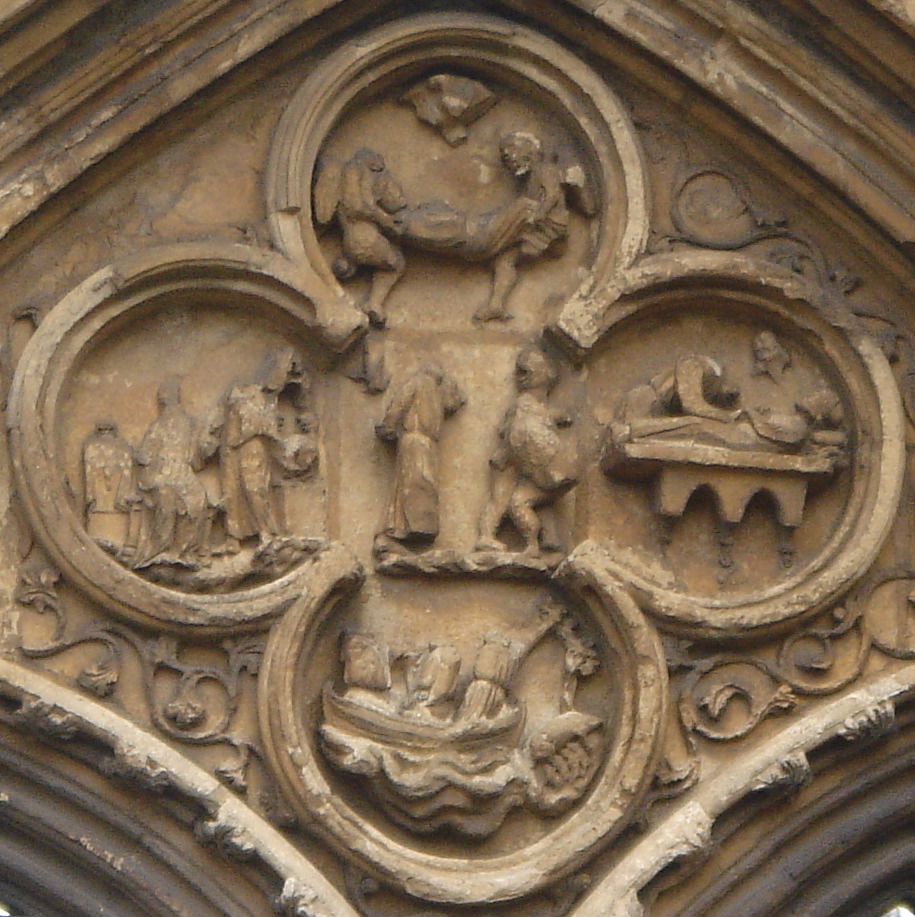
Quatrefoil scene from Crowland Abbey

Bettelin of Crowland, also known as Beccel, was an 8th-century Christian hermit and saint of Crowland, and a follower of Guthlac.

== Biography ==
Impressed by stories of his holiness, Bettelin traveled to be taught by Guthlac of Crowland, which at the time was in Mercia. Beccel served Guthlac fifteen years until his master's death in 714. A story is told however, that early in his tutelage he was afflicted with murderous thoughts against Guthlac, and he struggled to overcome them.

In 714 he took advice from Guthlac, as Guthlac was dying and he and Pega the sister of Guthlac, oversaw the burial of Guthlac. The event is recorded in the second poem of Guthlac, Felix's Life of Saint Guthlac and to a lesser extent the Anglo-Saxon Chronicle and the 15th-century Historia Croylandensis. Felix records that Beccel saw visions of light on the night before Guthlac died and at the time of his death.

There is some speculation Beccel may have been a king turned hermit.

Part of his hagiography concerning his before becoming a hermit:

[He] was a nobleman and married to an Irish princess. When they were traveling in a forest, his wife went into labour, he sought help but could find none and when he returned, both the wife and child were eaten by wolves. After this terrible experience Bettelin left the world, became a pupil of Guthlac of Crowland until Guthlac's death and the founding of the monastery nearby [where he lived] as a hermit under Abbot Kenulf.

== Veneration ==
His relics were translated to Staffordshire before the Vikings sacked Crowland Abbey. He is venerated by the Roman and Eastern Orthodox churches on 9 September.

He is sometimes confused with Bettelin of Stafford.
