= Pega =

8th-century Anglo-Saxon anchoress and saint

Saint Pega
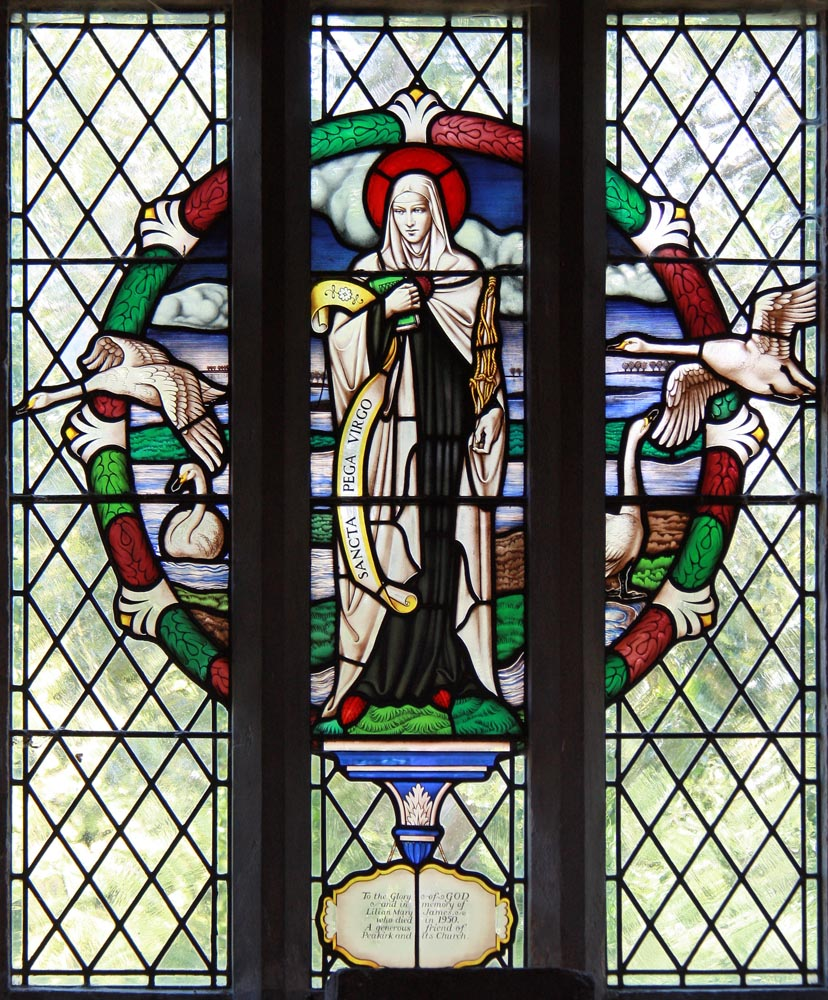
- Stained glass window depicting Saint Pega in Peakirk church

Anchoress
- Born: c. 673; Mercia
- Died: c. 719; Rome
- Venerated in: Catholic Church; Anglican Churches; Eastern Orthodox Church
- Major shrine: Peakirk (partially destroyed)
- Feast: 8 January

Pega (c. 673 – c. 719) is a Christian saint who was an anchoress in the ancient Anglo-Saxon kingdom of Mercia, and the sister of St Guthlac.

== Life ==
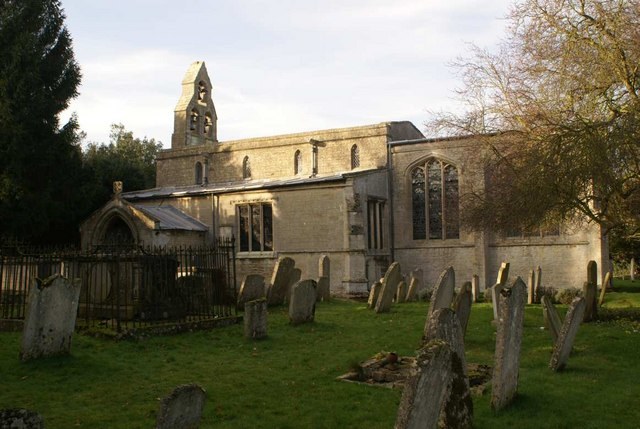
The parish church in Peakirk is dedicated to Saint Pega

The earliest source of information about Pega is in Felix's 8th-century Latin Life of Guthlac, where she is referred to as 'the holy virgin of Christ Pega'. As the sister of Guthlac, Pega would have been the daughter of Penwalh of Mercia and thus belonged to one of Mercia's great noble families.

She lived as an anchoress at what is now Peakirk ("Pega's church") near Peterborough, not far from Guthlac's hermitage at Crowland. When Guthlac realised that his end was near in 714, he summoned Pega, who travelled by boat to her brother's oratory to bury him. One year later, she presided over the translation of his remains into a new sepulchre, when his body was found to be incorrupt. At this time, Pega also used a piece of glutinous salt, which had been previously consecrated by Guthlac, to cure the eyesight of a blind man who had travelled to Crowland from Wisbech.

Henry of Avranches, in his 13th-century poetic life of Guthlac, adds the detail that Guthlac banished Pega from Crowland after the devil assumed her appearance and tempted him to break his fast.

In the 15th-century Croyland Chronicle, Pseudo-Ingulf claims that Pega inherited Guthlac's psalter and scourge, both of which she later gave to Kenulph, the first abbot of Crowland Abbey.

== Death, miracles and legacy ==
Pega went on pilgrimage to Rome after Guthlac's death and died there on 8 January 719, according to a 12th-century account by Orderic Vitalis. Orderic claims that her remains were kept at a church built in Rome in her honour, and that miracles took place there.

The precise location of Pega's hermitage is not known, but it is possible that it was on the site of the 13th-century chapel at St Pega's Hermitage in Peakirk, which is now a private residence.

Peakirk's Church of England parish church is uniquely dedicated to Pega. There is a local legend that Pega's heart was returned to Peakirk and was kept as a relic in the church contained in a heart stone. Its broken remains can still be seen in the south aisle window.

== St Pega's Hermitage ==
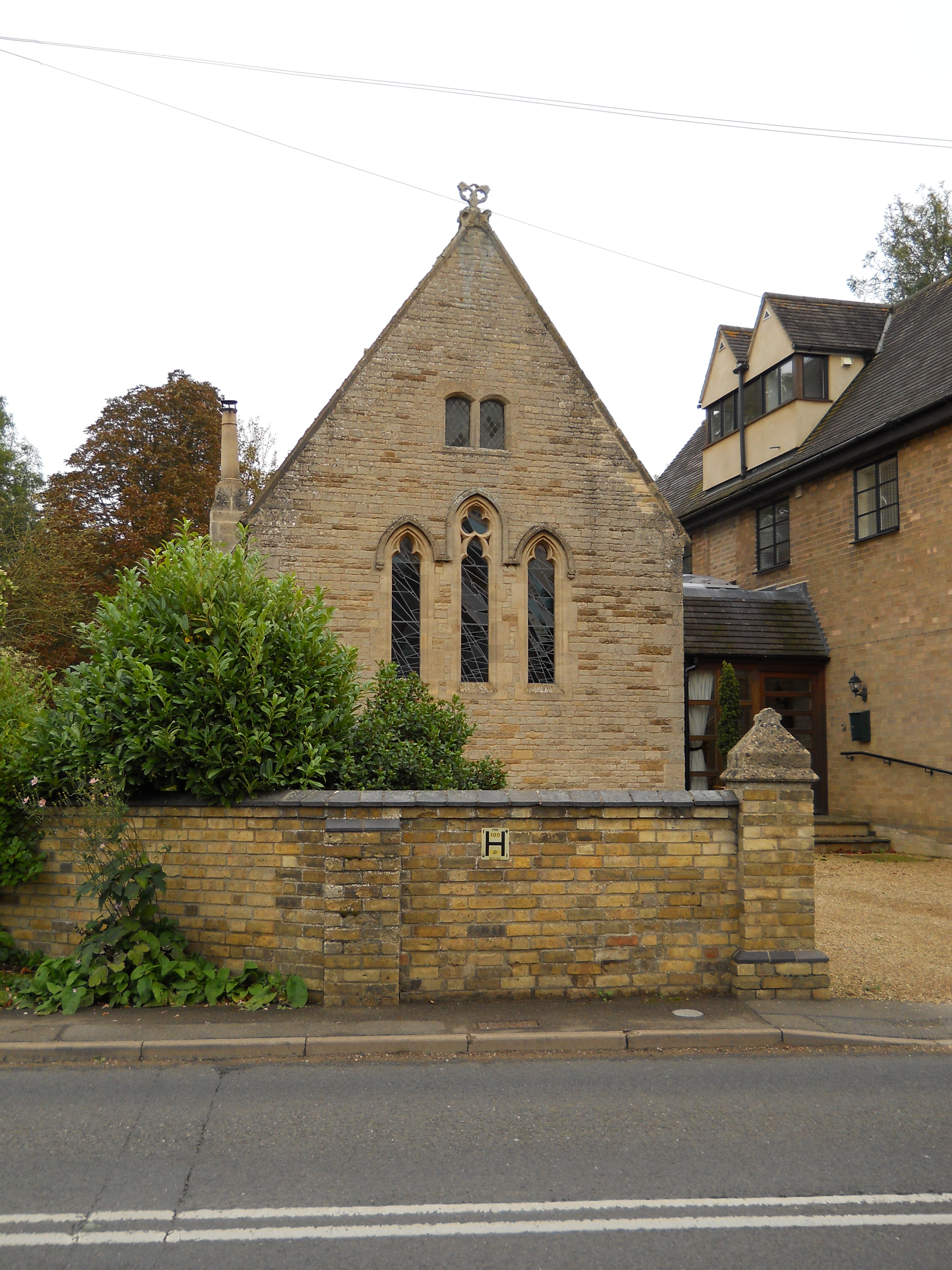
St Pega's Hermitage, Peakirk

St Pega's Hermitage is a chapel, now a private home, on what is considered likely to have been the site of St Pega's cell. A c. 1300 chancel was expanded with a 15th-century nave. It was rebuilt and restored over various centuries, with an order of Anglican nuns housed in accommodation built in the 1850s and extended in 1937 for the Community of the Holy Family.

The nuns, after 1980 from the Society of the Precious Blood, left in 2001, after which the property was deconsecrated by the Bishop of Peterborough, Ian Cundy, and sold. It has been converted into a private residence with an atrium linking the chapel, which retains the altar and other historic features, with the convent buildings. The Hermitage is Grade II listed.
