= Wulfram of Sens =

7th-century archbishop of Sens

Saint Wulfram of Sens
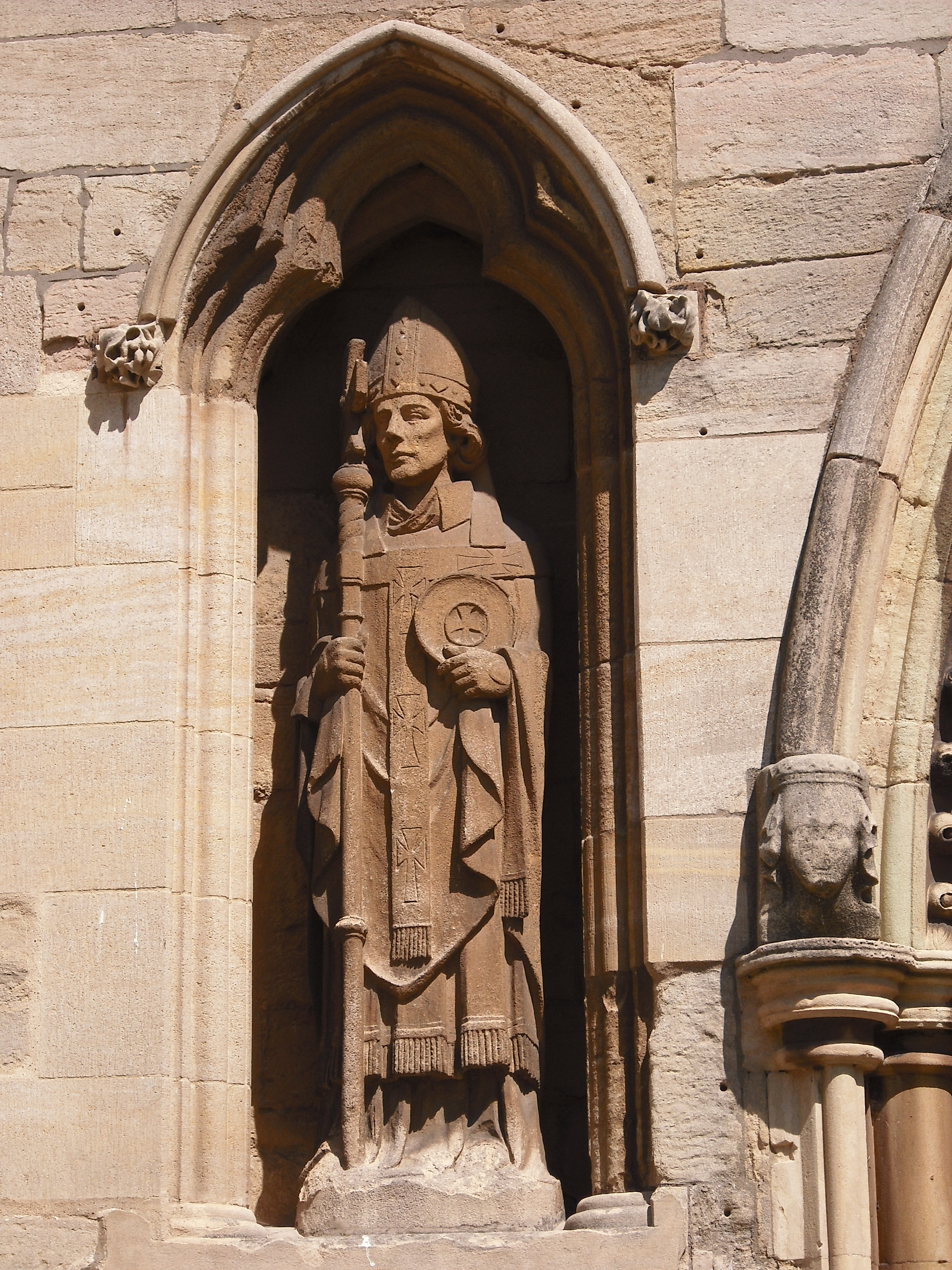
- St. Wulfram statue at his church in Grantham, Lincolnshire.

Confessor
- Born: c. 640 probably Milly-la-Forêt, Essonne, in now France
- Died: 20 March 703; Fontenelle, Kingdom of the Franks (now France)
- Venerated in: Roman Catholic Church, Anglican Communion, Eastern Orthodox Church
- Major shrine: Abbeville; Grantham
- Feast: 20 March; 15 October (Translation of his mortal remains)
- Attributes: Bishop baptizing a young king; cleric with a young king nearby; cleric arriving by ship with monks and baptizing a king; baptizing the son of King Radbod
- Patronage: Abbeville, France

Wulfram of Sens or Wulfram of Fontenelle (also Vuilfran, Wulfrann, Wolfran; Latin: Wulframnus; French: Vulfran or Vulphran; c. 640 – 20 March 703) was the Archbishop of Sens. His life was recorded eleven years after he died by the monk Jonas of Fontenelle. However, there seems to be little consensus about the precise dates of most events whether during his life or post mortem.

Wulfram is depicted in art as baptising a young king or the son of King Radbod. Sometimes the young king is near him and sometimes Wulfram is shown arriving by ship with monks to baptise the king. There are two churches dedicated to him in England, at Grantham, Lincolnshire, and Ovingdean, Sussex, and two in France, one at Abbeville, in the département of Somme, the other in Butot, in the département of the Seine Maritime. As a patron saint, he protects against the dangers of the sea.

== Early life ==
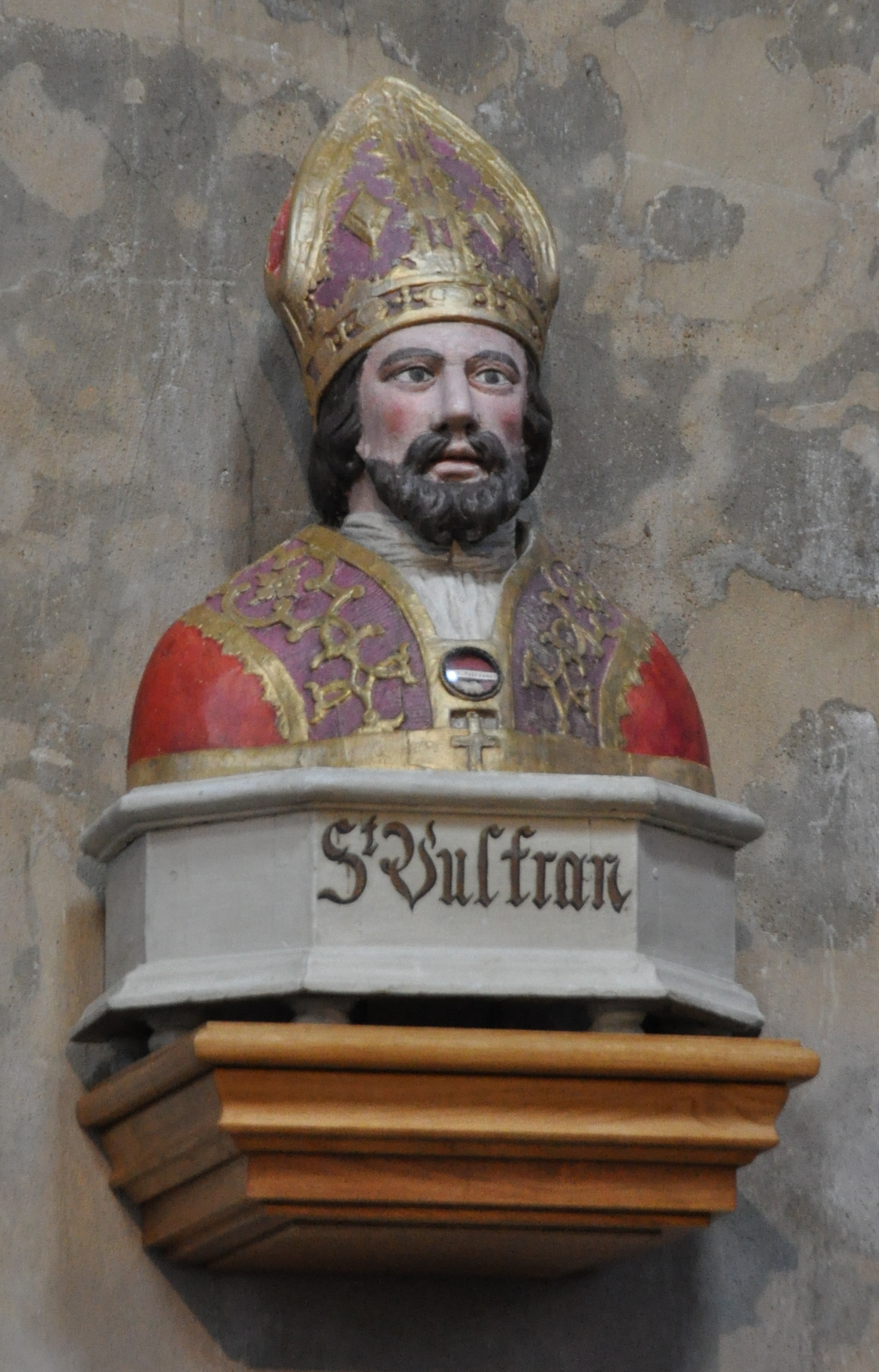
Saint Wulfran, Saint-Wulfran church in Abbeville

Wulfram was born in the diocese of Meaux, at Mauraliacus, an insecurely identified place near Fontainebleau, probably Milly-la-Forêt, Essonne. He was the son of a certain Fulbert, a knight attached to the court of Dagobert I, king of the Franks. King Dagobert's kingdom was divided on his death, and it was close to the court of his partial successor, Clovis II, king of Neustria and Burgundy that Wulfram is likely to have been born a little after Dagobert had died in 639.

Wulfram was educated at Clovis' court and showed a gift for academic learning. He took holy orders and seems to have intended a quiet life but was called to the court of Theodoric III (Thierry III) of Neustria. This seems to have propelled him into greater prominence since, in 692, he was elected Archbishop of Sens. There are various versions of the date for this, the earliest being in 682. However, by 693 he was in the post as he attended an assembly of bishops at Valenciennes.

In 695, he resigned the archbishopric and retired to the Benedictine abbey called "Fontenelle". There are several places called Fontenelle, but this was probably at St-Wandrille, near Caudebec-en-Caux on the lower Seine, in the Diocese of Rouen. However, Johannes Madey places it at Fontenelle in the extreme north of the département of Aisne.

== The mission in Friesland ==
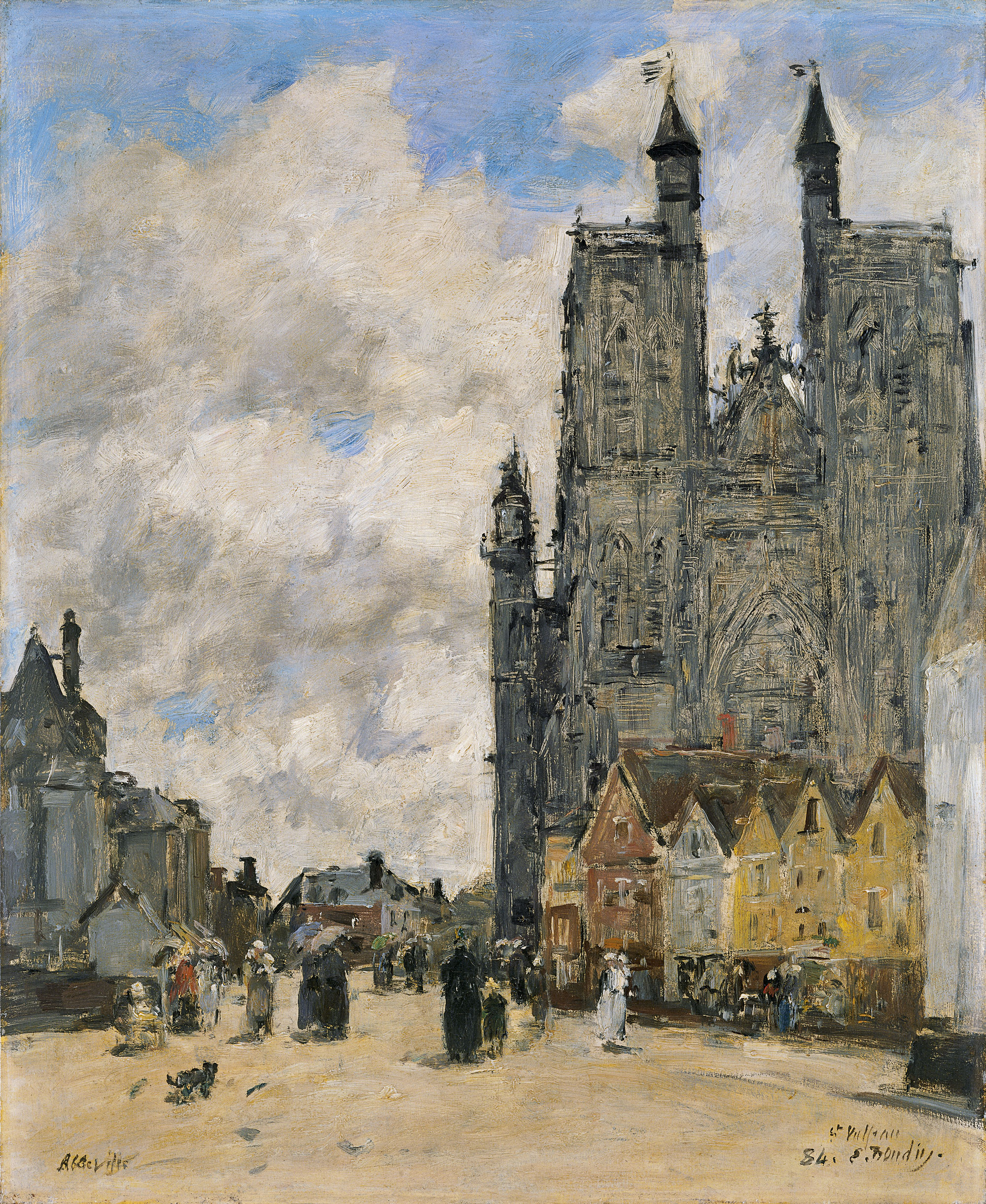
The Square of the Church of Saint Vulfran in Abbeville, Eugène Boudin, 1884

It is said that when Boniface withdrew from his missionary work in Friesland, in order to visit Rome for the second time, Wulfram stood in for him in Friesland. However, Boniface was a younger contemporary, his first and abortive mission in Frisia began in 716 or so, probably after Wulfram had died.

Whatever the order of these events, in Frisia, Wulfram converted the son of King Radbod and was allowed to preach. The custom was that people, including children, were sacrificed to the local gods having been selected by a form of lottery. Wulfram, having remonstrated with Radbod on the subject, was told that the king was unable to change the custom but Wulfram was invited to save them if he could. Wulfram then waded into the sea to save two children who had been tied to posts and left to drown as the tide rose.

According to the story, the turning point came with the rescue of a man, Ovon, who had been chosen by lot to be sacrificed by hanging. Wulfram begged King Radbod to stop the killing, but the people were outraged at the sacrilege proposed. In the end, they agreed that Wulfram's God could have a chance to save Ovon's life, and if he did, Wulfram and the God could have him. Ovon was hanged, and left for a couple of hours, while Wulfram prayed. When the Frisians decided to leave Ovon for dead, the rope broke, Ovon fell and was still alive. Ovon became Wulfram's slave, his follower, a monk, and then a priest at Fontenelle Abbey. The faith of the missionaries (and their power to work miracles) frightened and awed the people, who were baptized and turned away from paganism.

Even Radbod seemed ready for conversion, but just before his baptism, he asked where his ancestors were. Wulfram told him that idolaters went to Hell. Rather than be apart from his ancestors, he chose to stay as he was.

== Wulfram's death and after ==
He retired to Fontenelle, where he died in 703. His year of death is sometimes given as 720, but his interred body is said to have been moved in 704. Regardless of the exact year, Saint Wulfram's feast day is kept on 20 March. He was buried in St. Paul’s chapel in the abbey, but in 704, he was re-buried in the main church. The body was again moved in 1058, this time to the collegiate church of Our Lady in Abbeville, which was then re-dedicated in Wulfram's name. The translation of his body to Abbeville is commemorated on 15 October.

At about this time or later, perhaps when his body was again moved, this time to Abbeville, his arm was taken as a relic to Croyland Abbey, Lincolnshire. The interest in him there may have arisen from Ingulph, the abbot being a former monk of Fontenelle. Also, everyone concerned was a Benedictine. Ingulph, who died in 1109, was secretary to William I, who made him Abbot of Crowland in 1086.

A hagiographical account of his miracles was produced at the Abbey of Saint Wandrille before 1066. Among the miracles are two pertaining to childbirth and children. In one, Wulfram is credited with the miraculous delivery of a stillborn baby, the mother having commenced labor on 20 January (the feast day of Saint Sebastian). A week after Easter, prayers to Wulfram caused her belly to split open so the dead child could be delivered, after which the wound healed as if it had never been, leaving only a "token of the cut". In the other, Wulfram is credited with the safe passage of an accidentally swallowed clothespin, which left the body of a two-year-old boy after three days without having injured it: "Is it not miraculous how through all the twists of the boy's intestines, as if through fine small round tubes, the copper sharp object, now going up high, now going down low, could travel without getting stuck anywhere or causing wounds, and so at last through Nature's lower parts find a way out all in one piece?"

After the building at Crowland was damaged by fire, there was no longer a suitable place for keeping the relic, so it went to Grantham for safe-keeping. In pre-Reformation times the church contained a shrine of St. Wulfram. For two or three hundred years, the reliquary was kept in the crypt chapel below the Lady Chapel, where the pilgrims helped to wear the hollow, now to be seen in stone step before the altar. Later, towards 1350, the arm went to the specially added chapel above the north porch. At some stage in the long process of the English Reformation, this relic was lost.

There is a second church dedicated to Wulfran in Ovingdean; St. Wulfram's in Dorrington is no longer in use.

== See also ==
- Frisian-Frankish wars
