= Ingulf (disambiguation) =

Ingulf was an 11th-century Benedictine abbot of Crowland (Croyland).

Ingulf (also Ingulph; Anglo-Saxon Ingwulf, Old Norse Ingólfr) is a Germanic given name (from Ing, a theonym, and ulf "wolf"); besides the Crowland abbot, it may also refer to:

- Pseudo-Ingulf, the Croyland chronicle formerly associated with the abbot
- Ingulph, a 12th-century Abbot of Abingdon
- Ingólfr Arnarson, 9th-century settler of Iceland
- Ingulf the Mad, title of a 1989 fantasy novel and its eponymous main character
