= Thurcytel =

Abbot of Crowland and perhaps also of Bedford Abbey

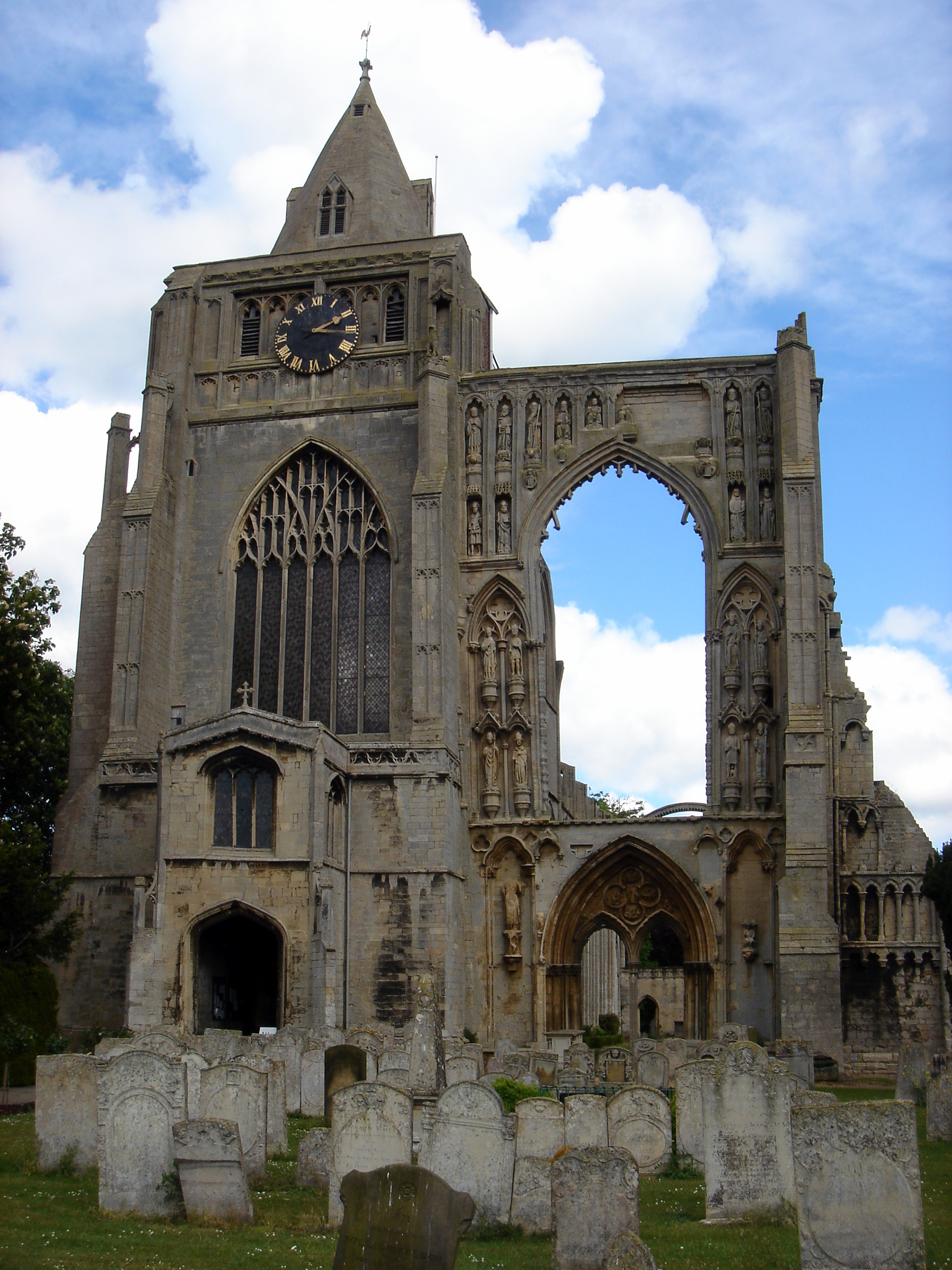
Croyland Abbey.

Thurcytel (or Thurkytel) (died 28 June 975?) was abbot of Crowland and perhaps also of Bedford Abbey.

Thurcytel of Crowland is known from the unreliable history of Crowland Abbey attributed to Pseudo-Ingulf, an account full of anachronisms including the claim that Thurcytel was Lord Chancellor of England. The gist of this account is that Thurcytel is a kinsman and servitor of several Kings of England, from Edward the Elder onwards, and fights at the battle of Brunanburh. He retires from secular life in the reign of King Eadred to become abbot of Crowland, which he has refounded and endowed with lands and treasures in 948. Pseudo-Ingulf's account indicates that Thuryctel died on 28 June 975.

Thurcytel of Crowland has long been identified with the Thurcytel who was abbot of Bedford Abbey at about the same time. Lewis, however, notes that "the case is not clear-cut". This Thurcytel was a kinsman of Oscytel, Archbishop of York, and, thus, also of Oscytel's successor Oswald of Worcester. The Anglo-Saxon Chronicle records that Archbishop Oscytel was buried at Bedford Abbey by Thurcytel in 971. Thurcytel of Bedford was said by some late sources to have been expelled and to have joined the canons of St Paul's in London where he had once been a priest.
