= Buckingham College, Cambridge =

Former college of the University of Cambridge (1428–1542)

Buckingham College
- Cambridge University
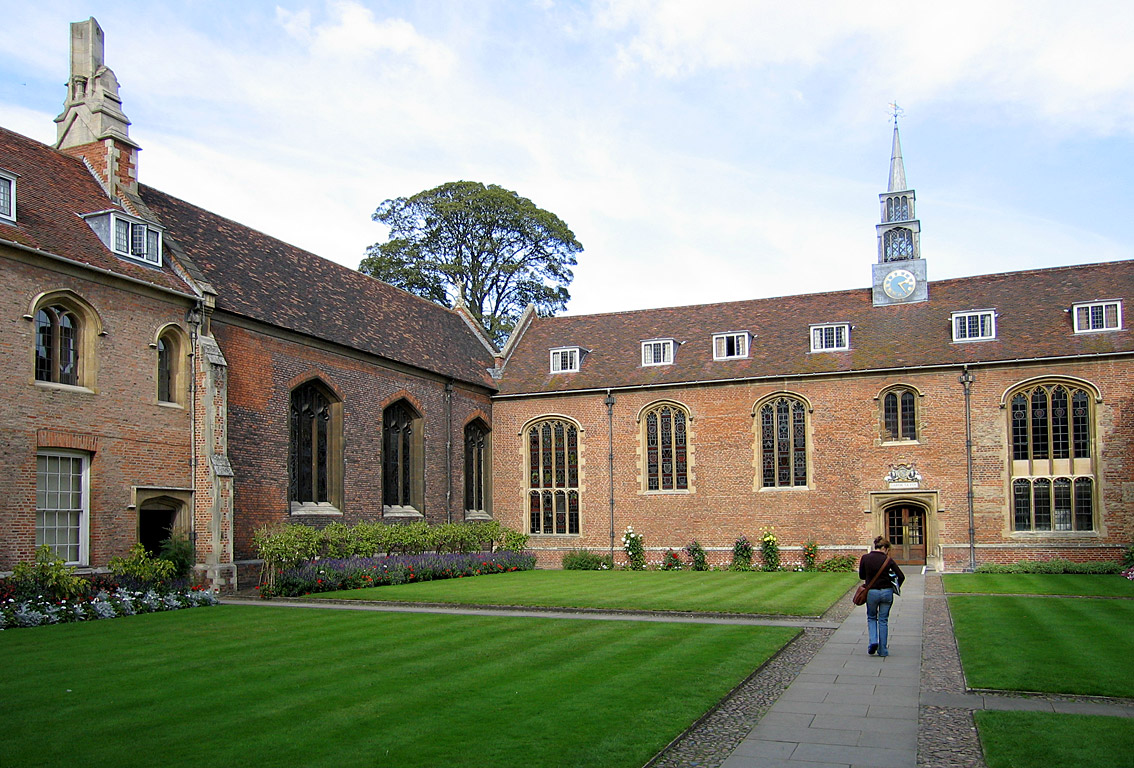
- Surviving buildings, now part of Magdalene College: the chapel, left, and hall, centre.
- Founder: John Lytlington
- Established: 1428 (reformed as Magdalene College in 1542)
- Named for: Henry Stafford, 2nd Duke of Buckingham
- Former names: Monks' Hostel

Buckingham College is the name of a former college of the University of Cambridge, that existed between 1428 and 1542, when it was reformed as Magdalene College.

Abbot John Lytlington of Crowland Abbey was licensed by Letters Patent of King Henry VI to acquire a site so that a hostel could be established in Cambridge for Benedictine student-monks. The Benedictines sited their Monks' Hostel north of the River Cam at a distance from the temptations of town.

The Benedictine monks began fine new buildings early in the 1470s. John of Wisbech, Abbot of Crowland, planned First Court and completed the Chapel. Individual Benedictine abbeys were invited to provide their own student chambers there. Four local Benedictine abbeys, Crowland, Ely, Ramsey and Walden, contributed to the college buildings.

As a result of patronage by the family of Henry Stafford, 2nd Duke of Buckingham, the name of the institution was changed from Monks' Hostel to Buckingham College (the change is known to have occurred between 1472 and 1483). Some students who were not monks were admitted and such lay students would have paid rent to the host abbey whose rooms they occupied.

Thomas Cranmer, later Archbishop of Canterbury, was appointed a lecturer at Buckingham in 1515. In 1519, Edward Stafford, 3rd Duke of Buckingham built the college Hall.

At the Dissolution of the Monasteries one of the abbeys involved in the College, Walden, came into the possession of Thomas, Lord Audley who then refounded Buckingham College as the College of St Mary Magdalene in 1542. Much of Magdalene's First Court dates from Buckingham College.
