= Congé d'élire =

Authorising the election of a bishop

A congé d'élire (/ˌkɒnʒeɪ dɛˈlɪər/ KON-zhay del-EER, French: [kɔ̃ʒe deliʁ]; Law French: congé d'eslire, lit. 'leave/permission to choose') is a licence from the Crown in England issued under the great seal to the dean and chapter of the cathedral church of a diocese, authorizing them to elect a bishop or archbishop, as the case may be, upon the vacancy of any episcopal see in England.

== History ==
The necessity of royal confirmation of the election of a bishop in Anglo-Saxon England, with the Crown delivering or withholding his ring and crozier, was previously claimed on the basis of the Croyland Chronicle credited to the abbot Ingulf; this is, however, now known to be a much later forgery.

Disputes arose for the first time between the crown of England and the see of Rome in the reign of William Rufus, the pope claiming to dispose of the English bishoprics. The Constitutions of Clarendon, promulgated by King Henry II of England in 1164, set out procedures to be used for episcopal elections. Ultimately King John, by his charter Ut liberae sunt electiones totius Angliae (1214), granted that the bishops should be elected freely by the deans and chapters of the cathedral churches, provided the royal permission was first asked, and the royal assent was required after the election.

This arrangement was confirmed by subsequent statutes passed in the reigns of Edward I and Edward III respectively, and the practice was ultimately settled in its present form by the statute Payment of Annates, etc., 1534. According to the provisions of this statute, upon the avoidance of any episcopal see, the dean and chapter of the cathedral church are to certify the vacancy of the see to the crown, and to pray that they may be allowed to proceed to a new election. The crown thereupon grants to the dean and chapter its licence under the great seal to elect a new bishop, accompanied by a letter missive containing the name of the person whom the dean and chapter are to elect. This is also published in the London Gazette within a few days of issue. The dean and chapter are thereupon bound to elect the person so named by the crown within twelve days, in default of which the crown is empowered by the statute to nominate by letters patent such person as it may think fit to the vacant bishopric. Upon the return of the election of the new bishop, the metropolitan is required by the crown to examine and to confirm the election, and the metropolitan's confirmation gives to the election its canonical completeness. In case of a vacancy in the metropolitical sees of Canterbury or York, an episcopal commission is appointed by the guardians of the spiritualities of the vacant see to confirm the election of the new metropolitan. These royal commissioners are usually headed by the other archbishop.

At one time deans of the "old foundation"—in contradistinction to those of the "new foundation", founded by Henry VIII out of the spoils of the dissolved monasteries—were elected by the chapter on a congé d’élire from the crown, but by the time of the First World War all deans were installed by letters patent from the Crown.

== See also ==
- Appointment of Church of England bishops
- Religion in England
