= Abbot of Crowland =

English abbot

The Abbot of Crowland was the head of Crowland Abbey, an English monastery built up around the shrine of Saint Guthlac of Crowland by King Æthelbald of Mercia, and refounded as a Benedictine house circa 948. The last abbot was John Wells (also called John Bridges), who was constrained to surrender the monastery to the king's agents during the Dissolution of the Monasteries in 1539.

== List of Benedictine abbots of Crowland ==
Abbots of Crowland
Incumbent	Dates	Notes
Saint Theodore of Crowland	d. 870	Holy Martyr
Thurcytel	ca 948—ca975	According to the History of Ingulf, the abbey was reformed and refounded in 948, with Thurcytel leaving the service of King Eadred to become its first new abbot. The same claims he died in 975.
Ægelric I	fl. late 10th century	Ægelric was, according to Orderic Vitalis, Thurcytel's nephew.
Ægelric II	fl. late 10th century/ early 11th century	Like Ægelric I, Ægelric II was supposedly a relative of Thurcytel.
Osketel	fl. ca 1012	Supposedly died on 7 October.
Godric	fl. early 11th century	Orderic Vitalis gives his death as 19 January.
Wulfgeat	fl. early-to-mid-11th century	According to Orderic Vitalis, he was Abbot of Peakirk and had permission from Edward the Confessor to hold both abbeys at once. Died on 7 July.
Leofric of Peterborough	fl. mid-11th century	According to the Peterborough Chronicle Leofric held Crowland along with four other abbeys.
Wulfketel	ca 1061—1085x6	Orderic claims that he appointed abbot by Edward the Confessor and Abbot Leofric, and that he was abbot for 24 years. He died at the Gloucester Christmas court of William the Conqueror, in either December 1085 or January 1086. The 'abbot Ulfketyl' of Charles Kingsley novel "Hereward the Wake'".
Ingulf	1085x6—1109	Died 16 November, probably in 1109, as he was said to have been abbot for 24 years (see Wulfketel & Geoffrey d'Orleans notes).
Geoffrey d'Orleans	1109—ca 1124	Orderic says he was born at Orleans, was prior of St Évroult in Normandy, being appointed abbot of Crowland in 1109, holding for 15 years before dying on 5 June (probably 1124).
Waltheof	ca 1126—1138	According to Orderic, he was the "brother of the nobly born Englishman Gospatric", thought to mean that he was the son of Gospatric, Earl of Northumbria (the brother being Gospatric II, Earl of Lothian).
Godfrey	1138x9—1143	Prior of St Albans, electet abbot of Crowland in December 1138 or soon after, and died on 6 April 1143.
Edward	1143—1173	Died on 19 January 1173; after death, the abbey was vacant until sometime after 8 July 1175.
Robert	1175—1189x90	Monk of Reading Abbey, became prior of Leominster, and was appointed abbot of Crowland in the second half of 1175, allegedly remaining abbot for 15 years. His last historical appearance is 3 September 1189, and died on either 17 March or 24 March 1190.
Henry de Longchamp	1190—1236	William de Longchamp, Bishop of Ely, he held the abbey for 46 years, dying in 1236.
Walter de Weston	el. 1236	Monk of Crowland, receives royal consent to hold abbey on 28 September 1236, but was elected against church rules and election was quashed.
Richard	1236—1248	He was the cellarer of Bardney Abbey before being appointed to abbey by Robert Grosseteste, Bishop of Lincoln, who had authority from the Church to make such an appointment. He died 17 June 1248.
Thomas de Welle	1248—1254	A monk of Crowland, sometime sub-prior, he was abbot after Richard's death and held abbey for 6 years, dying on either 8 October or 15 October 1254.
Ranulf de Merche	1254—1280	Another monk of Crowland, after becoming abbot he ruled for 26 years.
Richard de Crowland	1280—1303	Monk of Crowland, elected 27 October 1280, election quashed but appointed anyway by the Bishop of Lincoln, Oliver Sutton.
Simon de Luffenham [Suthluffenham]	1303—1324	He was another abbot from the Crowland monks. He held the abbey for 21 years, notably attending the Council of Vienne in 1311, and dying sometime in 1324.
Henry de Casewick	1324—1359	He was prior of Crowland before becoming abbot in 1324. The abbey suffered from great poverty during his abbacy, coming under the supervision of the crown, the Archbishop of Canterbury and the Earl of Northampton. He died early in 1359.
Thomas de Barnack	1359—1378	A monk of Crowland, he was elected for presentation to the bishop of Lincoln and confirmed by the latter in 1339. After a 14 year abbacy, he died on 12 March 1378.
John of Ashby	from 1378	He became abbot in 1378.
Thomas of Overton	from 1392	He became abbot in 1392.
Richard Upton	from 1417	He became abbot in 1417.
John Litlington	from 1427	He became abbot in 1427. He was licensed by Letters Patent of King Henry VI to acquire a site so that a hostel could be established in Cambridge for student-monks. This hostel was to become Buckingham College and eventually Magdalene College.
John of Wisbech	from 1470	He became abbot in 1470.
Richard Crowland	from 1476	He became abbot in 1476.
Lambert Fossdyke	from 1484	He became abbot in 1484.
Edmund Thorpe	from 1485	He became abbot in 1485.
Philip Everard	from 1497	He became abbot in 1497.
William Gedding	from 1504	He became abbot in 1504.
Richard Bardney	from 1507	He became abbot in 1507.
John Wells (alias John Bridges)	1512—1539	Wells was the last abbot, ruling the abbey from 1512 until he was forced to hand it over to the king's agents in 1539, after the Second Act of Dissolution.

== Notes ==
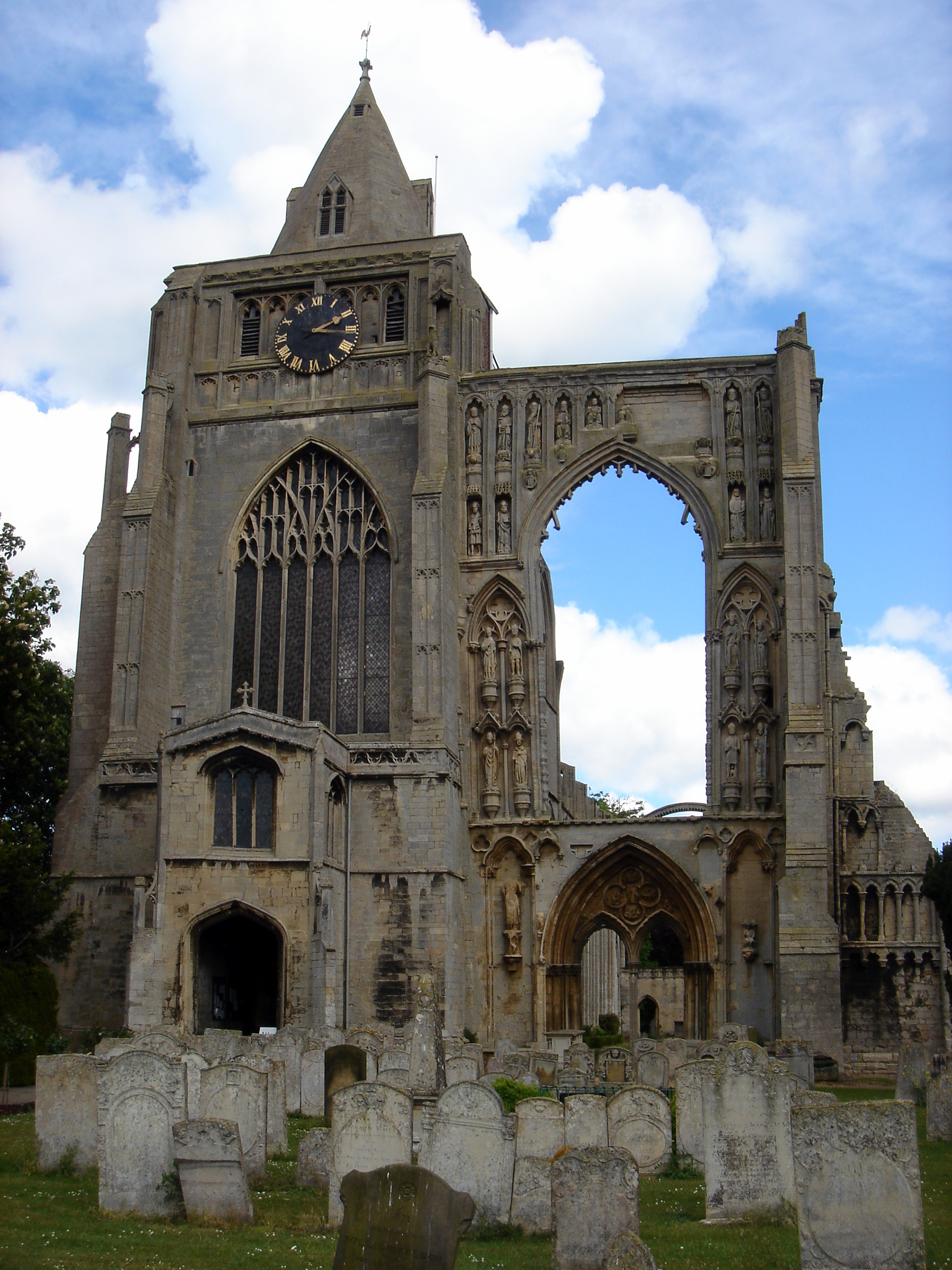
Croyland Abbey.
