= Guthlac poems A and B =

Old English poems

Guthlac A and Guthlac B are a pair of Old English poems written in celebration of the deeds and death of Saint Guthlac of Croyland, a popular Mercian saint. The two poems are presented consecutively in the important Exeter Book miscellany of Old English poetry, the fourth and fifth items in the manuscript. They are clearly intended to be considered two items, judging from the scribe's use of large initials at the start of each poem. Guthlac A begins on 32v, and Guthlac B begins on 44v.

The poems, like the majority of extant Old English poetry, are composed in alliterative verse.

== Summaries ==
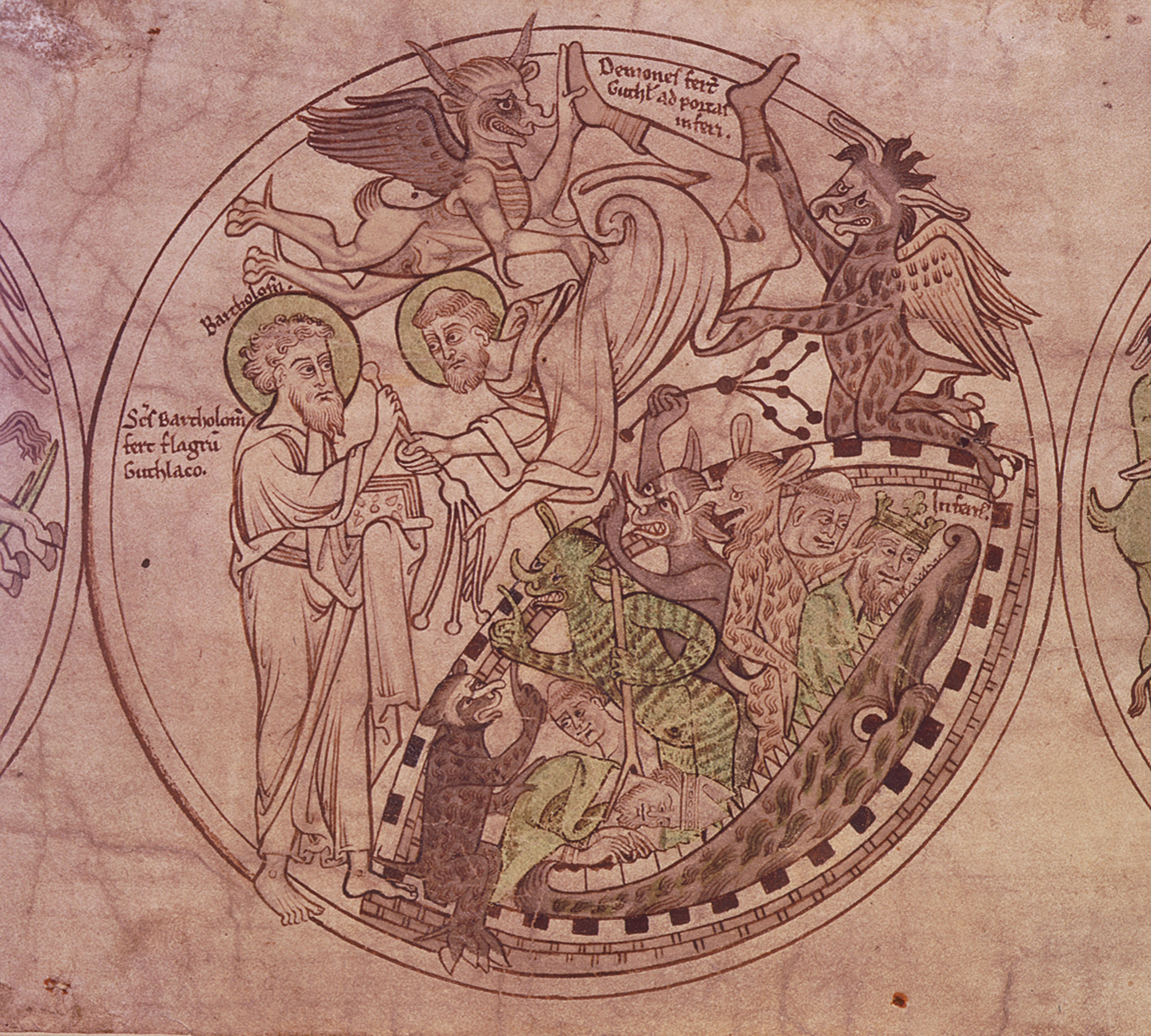
Saint Guthlac, tormented by demons, is handed a scourge by St Bartholomew, Guthlac Roll, 1210, British Library

=== Guthlac A ===
Guthlac A begins by reflecting on the transience of the goodness of creation, dwelling on the idea that humans are getting weaker in piety by the generation, and that those who uphold the laws of God are lessening in number. Furthermore, it is recognized as the tendency of the young man to forsake spirituality for earthly pursuits, while as an older man, he would be more aware of his mortality and turn to God. Those who serve their own earthly interests will mock those who strive towards higher heavenly grace, but those who forsake themselves for that grace are sacrificing worldly pleasures in anticipation of the divine satisfaction to come.

Guthlac started out as a more worldly man who focused on material pursuits instead of pleasing the Lord. One night, an angel and a devil have a fight over his soul, with the angel trying to pull Guthlac toward serving God, and the devil trying to assure Guthlac of the promises of material pleasure and violence. After a long fight, God declares the angel to have won Guthlac's soul.

Guthlac is now living alone in a mountain dwelling, a place that is infested with demons who seek still to win Guthlac over. It is here that Guthlac is tempted and threatened by these demons, but he has the protection of an angel on hand. This angel comforts him and helps him stand up to the demons, while he commits to an ascetic lifestyle, denying himself of all bodily pleasures.

Guthlac is given a glimpse of the world by the demons, which include the wayward lifestyles of those who are building up treasures and material comforts in the monasteries when they are supposed to be serving God.

Even though the demons drag him into hell, Guthlac continues to sing his worship to God. When the demons tell him that he is not good enough for heaven, Guthlac assures them that he will accept the torment of hell and still sing God's praises, if that is God's wish. Guthlac assures the demons that they will always be the wretched way that they are, and suffer misery for eternity, because they will never know God.

Finally, a messenger from God, the Apostle Bartholomew, orders the demons to free Guthlac and return him to his wilderness dwelling unharmed. The demons have no choice but to obey, and Guthlac once again praises God. Guthlac is eventually given a place in heaven with God as his protector, and in moral-tale fashion, the same is assured to those who revere the truth and please God. The poem has made the conflict between good and evil its main purpose, assuring that the events are for all times.

=== Guthlac B ===
Guthlac B is more of a conversational exchange piece. Although the first poem's dialogue is mostly between Guthlac and a set of demons, the second is between Guthlac and another person. It has less action and more discourse. Death is portrayed, not as the eternal doom of humanity, but as the ultimate freedom for Guthlac from the hardships that have been endured in his life.

The focus is on Guthlac's death, on the destiny that was meant for him and the rest of humankind since Adam and Eve were banished from the Garden of Eden. The poem first reflects upon this ultimate human tragedy, where the onslaught of Original Sin made it so that nobody descended from humanity would be free from sin and death.

Guthlac, after having spent several years in the wilderness, is now afflicted with a disease that came to him in the night and will only get worse. Guthlac sickens for days in care of his servant Beccel, and he knows his time of earthly departure will be near.

Despite being sick, Guthlac finds the strength to preach movingly, as if being angelic, from the Gospel on Easter. However, he only grows more ill, and is heard arguing in the night. When asked about it, Guthlac tells his servant that he has been speaking to an angel in the final days of his sickness, and that the servant is to tell Guthlac's sister Pega that he will see her in heaven later, and to claim and bury his body. Then Guthlac opens his mouth to release a sweet, honey-like odor that gives comfort to his servant to breathe. Guthlac tells the servant that it is now time to carry the message of his passing to his sister. Then Guthlac dies, with angels carrying his soul to heaven.

The servant travels quickly to Pega by ship, dutifully and broken-heartedly obeying his master's last wish. The poem ends there, with the servant conveying the extent of his suffering at the loss.

== Sources ==
Early editors posited that one or both of the poems could have been composed by the poet Cynewulf, but neither poem is numbered among that writer's compositions today.

Guthlac B is certainly based primarily on Felix's Latin life of St. Guthlac, the Vita Sancti Guthlaci, written sometime between 730 and 740. The relationship between Guthlac A and the Vita Sancti Guthlaci is, however, less clear. Some recent scholarship concludes that the Old English poem is based directly on the Latin, but other work finds a more complex relationship. An Old English version of the life can be found among the Vercelli Homilies, and a text like this may have been the source for at least some of Guthlac A.

== Editions and translations ==
- Bradley, S. A. J. Anglo-Saxon Poetry: an Anthology of Old English Poems in Prose Translation. London: Everyman, 1982. (tr.)
- Foys, Martin et al. Old English Poetry in Facsimile Project, Madison: Center for the History of Print and Digital Culture, University of Wisconsin-Madison, 2019- (ed., tr. of Guthlac A with digital facsimile pages).
- Kennedy, Charles W. The Poems of Cynewulf, Translated into English. London: Routledge & Sons; New York: Dutton & Co.: 1910. 264–305. (tr.)
- Krapp, George Philip and Elliot Van Kirk Dobbie, ed. The Exeter Book. New York: Columbia UP, 1936. (ed.)
- Muir, Bernard J. The Exeter Anthology of Old English Poetry. Exeter: U of Exeter P, 1994. 2 vol. (ed.)
- Roberts, Jane. The Guthlac Poems of the Exeter Book. Oxford: Clarendon; New York: Oxford UP, 1979. (ed.)
