= Thomas Stiles =

Thomas Stiles or Styles (fl. 1642–1662) of Walton in the parish of Paston, Northamptonshire, was a captain in the Royalist army during the English Civil War. He was governor of Crowland in 1642–1643 and after a time as a prisoner, commander of a troop of horse based at Belvoir Castle.

== Biography ==
Crowland Abbey in Lincolnshire was garrisoned by Royalists in 1642, the first year of the Civil War. Captain Stiles was the first governor. At Oliver Cromwell's request he was imprisoned in Colchester Castle after the abbey was captured by Parliamentary forces under Cromwell's command in 1643.

In September 1644 (after 18 months' imprisonment), Styles was exchanged for Captain Henry Fines (alias Clinton), on the condition that Styles was to travel to Peterborough and from there to Belvoir Castle. At Belvoir, Styles took command of a troop of horse. Not long after his arrival his troop took part in an operation to relieve the garrison at Croyland, but it failed because of Parliamentary forces under the command of Charles Fleetwood and Thomas Fairfax. Styles held the command until the end of the First Civil War. The general surrender in his region of England followed the garrison of Newark's surrender on 6 May 1646 at the behest of Charles I (after his journey to the Scottish army encamped besieging Newark).

After the end of the First Civil War the estate belonging to Styles was sequestrated and he had to compound to get them back. In 1655—a time of tension (see Penruddock uprising)—Stiles had to provide a bond of £1,000 for his good conduct.

In 1662 (after the restoration of the monarchy in 1660), Styles petitioned the Commissioners for the relief of loyal and indigent officers.

Styles died in or around 1678.

== Family ==
Stiles married Lucy.
