= Croyland Chronicle =

Dubious source for English medieval history

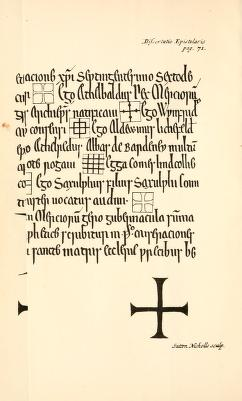
Frontispiece of the Croyland Chronicle in the 1894 edition

The Croyland Chronicle, also called Crowland Chronicle or Historia Croylandensis, is an important primary source for English medieval history, particularly the late 15th century. It is named for its place of origin, the Benedictine Abbey of Croyland or Crowland, in Lincolnshire, England. It was formerly also known as the Chronicle of Ingulf or Ingulphus after its supposed original compiler, the 11th-century abbot Ingulf. As that section of the text is now known to have been a later forgery, its author is instead known as Pseudo-Ingulf. The validity of the source itself has been questioned, partially due to the unknown identity of the original author, and gaps in all continuations of the text. There has also been substantially little effort made to find and translate the original manuscript.

== Contents ==
Several historical chronicles were written at the Abbey of Croyland, which was the wealthiest religious foundation in eastern England during the Middle Ages. Alison Weir writes that the chronicles dated before 1117 are "spurious", while the three anonymously written "continuations" that span the periods 1144–1469, 1459–1486 and 1485–1486 are genuine. It also contains letters which were forged to prove the rights of the monastery.

The first entry of the chronicle concerns 655 AD. Text credited to the Abbot Ingulf follows the initial founding of Croyland Abbey, dedicated to St Guthlac by King Æthelbald, as well as its destruction by the Danes in the late 9th century, and the rebuilding of the monastery. A forged part of the text was formerly used to support the existence of a form of the congé d'élire—royal power over investiture of bishops—in Anglo-Saxon England prior to the Norman Conquest.

The part that covers the years 1459–1486, called the Second Continuation, was written in April 1486, after Henry Tudor had become King Henry VII of England. The text is concerned primarily with the prelude of the War of the Roses, and mild recounting of the battles fought between Richard III and Henry VII. It was written by someone who had access to information from the court of Richard III—described as being a doctor of canon law and member of Edward IV's council. Some historians believe that author was John Russell, Bishop of Lincoln, who was Richard's Lord Chancellor for most of his reign (until Richard dismissed him on 24 July 1485). Others conclude the work was written by a monk of Crowland who has edited a secular source.

Over the years, there has been confusion between the second and third continuators, and the fourth continuator claims not to know the identity of the third. It is, in fact, the second continuator (covering the period 1459–1486) who claims to be writing in April 1486, and, sure enough, this section ends with the marriage of Henry VII of England and Elizabeth of York and the rebellion that followed. This date ties in with the survival of a copy of Titulus Regius in the text, and Russell is known to have been at Crowland during April 1486.

== Manuscripts ==
The original of the Croyland Chronicle is not known. There are several traditions. The fragmentary "British Library (BL) Cotton MS Ortho B xiij" (15th century) and "BL Arundel 178" (16th century).

== Editions ==
- Savile, Henry, ed. (1596). "Descriptio compilata per dominum Ingulphum Abbatem Monasterii Croyland". Rerum Anglicarum scriptores post Bedam praecipui. London. pp. 484r–520r.
- Ingulph's Chronicle of the Abbey of Croyland: with the continuations by Peter of Blois and anonymous writers. Bohn's Antiquarian Library. Translated by Riley, Henry T. London: Henry G. Bohn. 1854.
- Pronay, Nicholas; Cox, John, eds. (1986). The Crowland Chronicle Continuations: 1459–1486. London: Alan Sutton. ISBN 978-0948993008.
