= Guthlac of Crowland =

Christian saint and hermit, 674–714 ACE

Saint Guthlac of Crowland
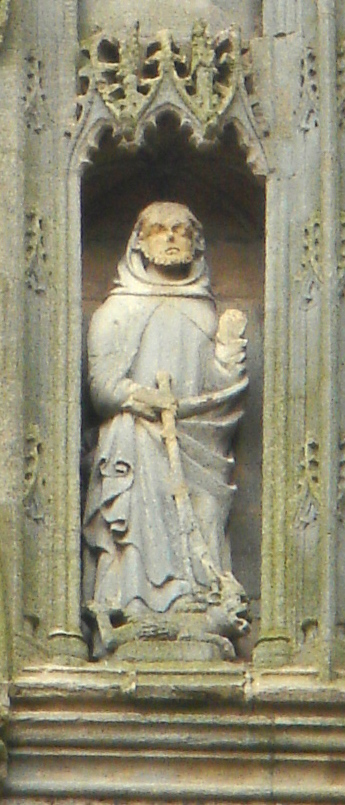
- A 15th-century statue from the second tier of the ruined nave of Crowland Abbey

Hermit
- Born: 674; Kingdom of Mercia
- Died: 714 (aged 40–41); Croyland, Kingdom of Mercia
- Venerated in: Anglican Communion; Catholic Church; Eastern Orthodox Church
- Major shrine: Crowland Abbey; (until 1539)
- Feast: 11 April

Guthlac of Crowland (Old English: Gūðlāc; Latin: Guthlacus; 674‍–‍714 AD) was a Christian hermit and saint in England. He is particularly venerated in the Fens of eastern England where he spent his last years at Crowland in Lincolnshire.

== Hagiography ==
=== Early life ===
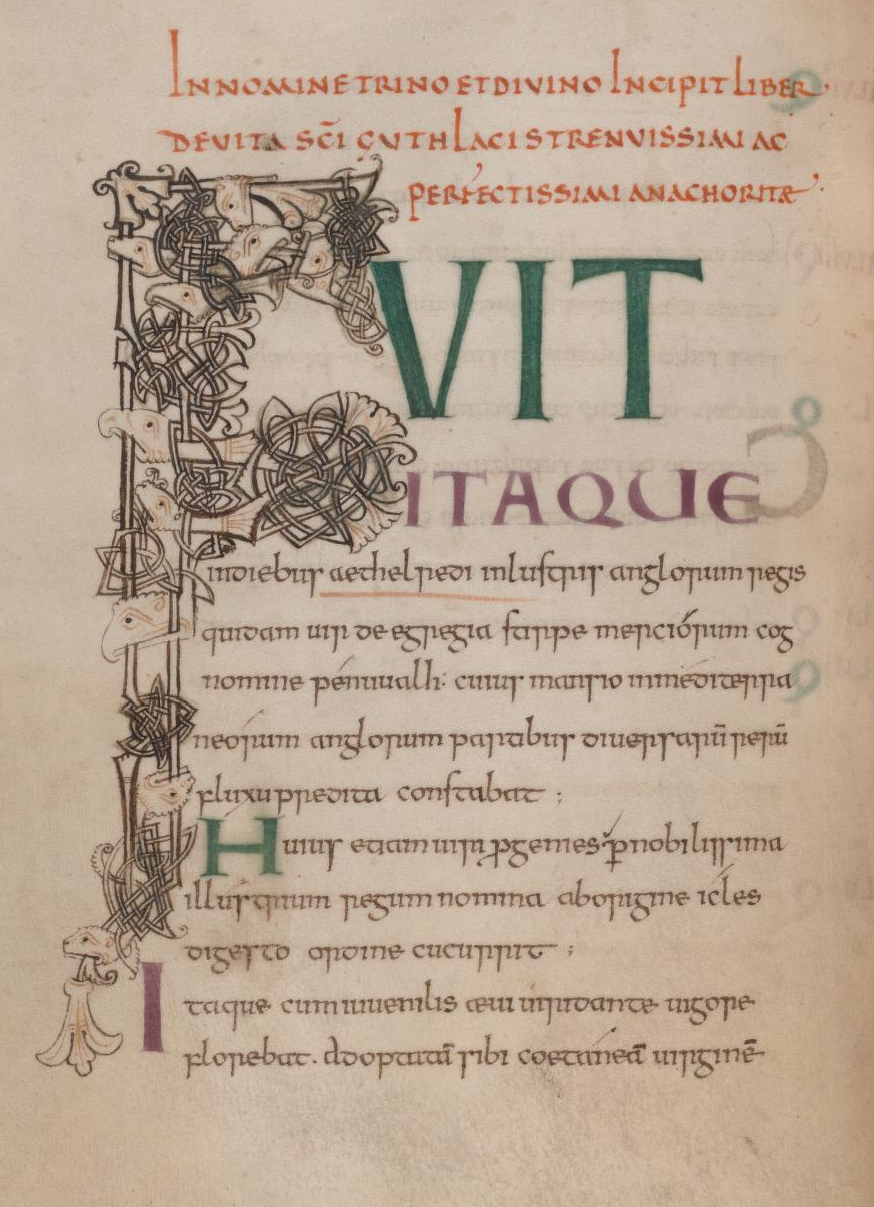
Beginning of Felix's Life of St Guthlac, 8C, Parker Library, Corpus Christi College

Guthlac was the son of Penwalh or Penwald, a noble of the English kingdom of Mercia, and his wife Tette. Guthlac's sister, Pega, is venerated as a saint as well. As a young man, Guthlac fought in the army of King Æthelred of Mercia (r. 675–704). He subsequently became a monk at Repton Abbey in Derbyshire at the age of 24, under the abbess there (Repton being a double monastery). Two years later he sought to live the life of a hermit, and moved out to the island of Croyland, now called Crowland (in present-day Lincolnshire), on St Bartholomew's Day, 699. His early biographer, Felix, writing in the early 8th century, asserts that Guthlac could understand the strimulentes loquelas ('sibilant speech', that is "barbarous language") of Brittonic-speaking demons who haunted him there, only because Guthlac had spent some time in exile among Celtic Britons.

=== Hermit ===
Guthlac built a small oratory and cells in the side of a plundered barrow on the island. There he lived until his death on 11 April 714. Felix, writing within living memory of Guthlac, described his hermit's existence:

Now there was in the said island a mound built of clods of earth which greedy comers to the waste had dug open, in the hope of finding treasure there; in the side of this there seemed to be a sort of cistern, and in this Guthlac the man of blessed memory began to dwell, after building a hut over it. From the time when he first inhabited this hermitage this was his unalterable rule of life: namely to wear neither wool nor linen garments nor any other sort of soft material, but he spent the whole of his solitary life wearing garments made of skins. So great indeed was the abstinence of his daily life that from the time when he began to inhabit the desert he ate no food of any kind except that after sunset he took a scrap of barley bread and a small cup of muddy water. For when the sun reached its western limits, then he thankfully tasted some little provision for the needs of this mortal life.

=== Veneration ===
Guthlac's pious and holy ascetic life became the talk of the land, and many people visited the hermit during his life to seek spiritual guidance from him. He gave sanctuary to Æthelbald, future king of Mercia, who was fleeing from his cousin Ceolred (r. 709–716). Guthlac predicted that Æthelbald would become king, and Æthelbald promised to build him an abbey if his prophecy became true. Æthelbald indeed became king (r. 716–757), and even though Guthlac had died two years before, Æthelbald kept his word and started to build Crowland Abbey on St Bartholomew's Day, 716. Guthlac's feast day is celebrated on 11 April.

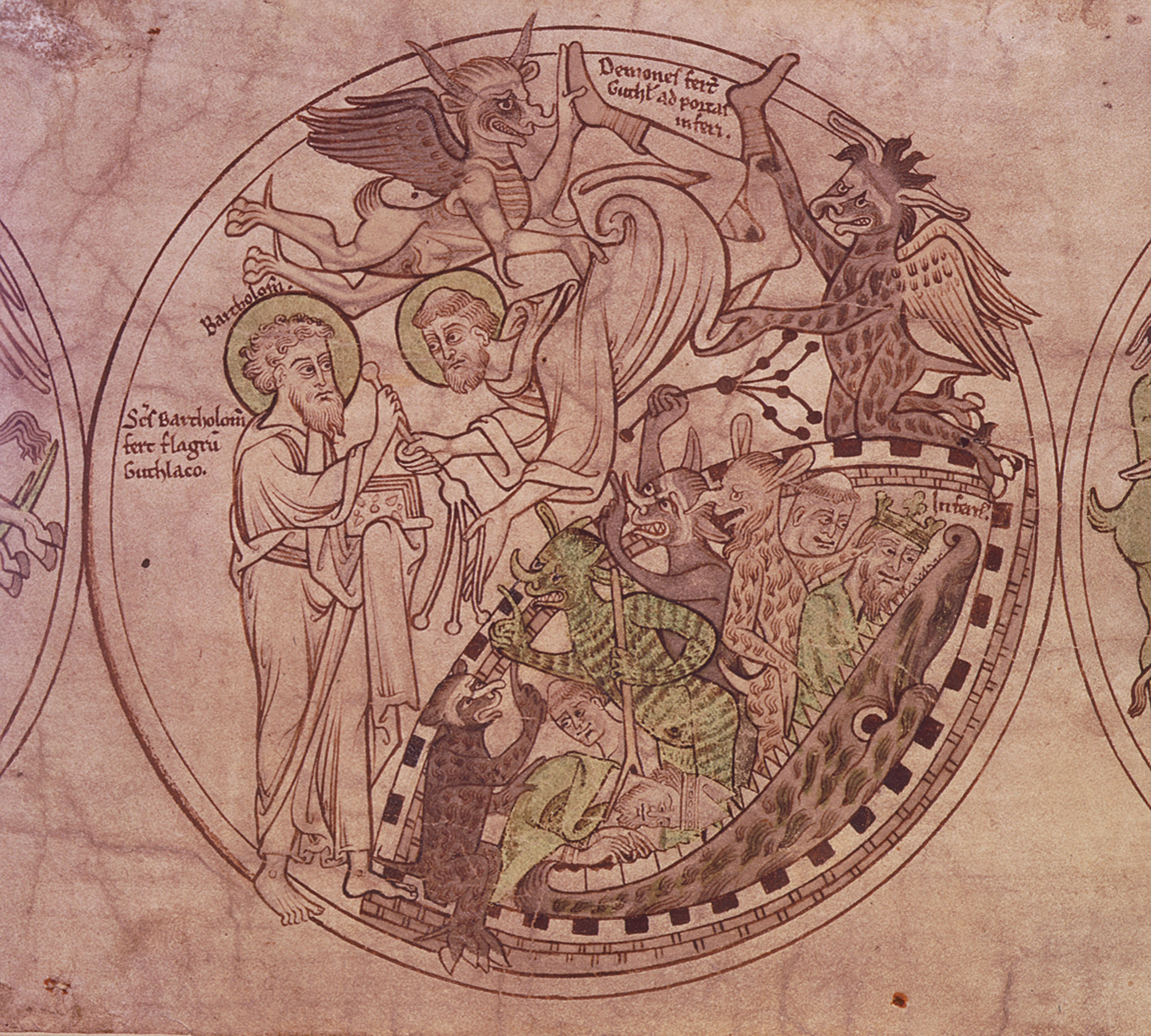
St Guthlac, tormented by demons, is handed a scourge by St Bartholomew, Guthlac Roll, 1210, British Library

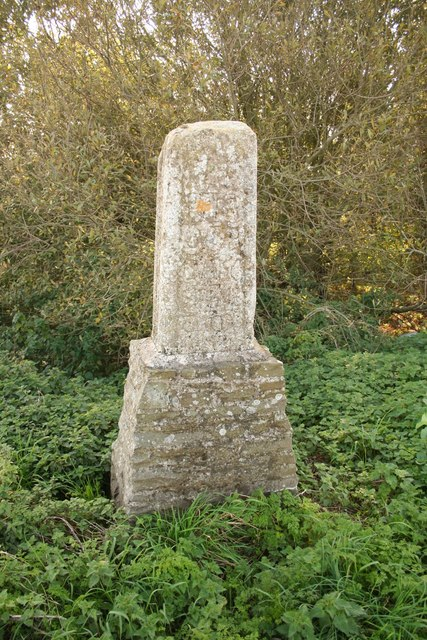
St Guthlac's cross from c. 1200, inscribed Hanc Petra Guthlac ..., marked the boundary of Crowland Abbey.

The 8th-century Latin Vita sancti Guthlaci, written by Felix, describes the entry of the demons into Guthlac's cell:

[...] they were ferocious in appearance, terrible in shape with great heads, long necks, thin faces, yellow complexions, filthy beards, shaggy ears, wild foreheads, fierce eyes, foul mouths, horses' teeth, throats vomiting flames, twisted jaws, thick lips, strident voices, singed hair, fat cheeks, pigeon breasts, scabby thighs, knotty knees, crooked legs, swollen ankles, splay feet, spreading mouths, raucous cries. For they grew so terrible to hear with their mighty shriekings that they filled almost the whole intervening space between earth and heaven with their discordant bellowings.

Felix records Guthlac's foreknowledge of his own death, conversing with angels in his last days. At the moment of death a sweet nectar-like odour emanated from his mouth, as his soul departed from his body in a beam of light while the angels sang. Guthlac had requested a lead coffin and linen winding-sheet from Ecgburh, Abbess of Repton Abbey, so that his funeral rites could be performed by his sister Pega. Arriving the day after his death, she found the island of Crowland filled with the scent of ambrosia. She buried the body on the mound after three days of prayer. A year later Pega had a divine calling to move the tomb and relics to a nearby chapel: Guthlac's body is said to have been discovered uncorrupted, his shroud shining with light. Subsequently Guthlac appeared in a miraculous vision to Æthelbald, prophesying that he would be a future King of Mercia.

== Legacy ==
The cult of Guthlac continued amongst a monastic community at Crowland, with the eventual foundation of Crowland Abbey as a Benedictine establishment in 971. A series of fires at the abbey mean that few records survive from before the 12th century. It is known that in 1136 the remains of Guthlac were moved once more, and that finally in 1196 his shrine was placed above the main altar.

The Yorkshire village of Golcar on the outskirts of Huddersfield is named after Guthlac, who preached in the area during the 8th century. The name of the village is recorded in the Domesday Book of 1086 as Goullakarres. Scholar of early modern British history Paul Cavill discusses in a 2015 essay the origins of the name Guthlac and whether his hagiographer Felix intended to convey that Guthlac was named after his tribe and land, or if, instead, these were named in honour of Guthlac.

It has been proposed that Shakespeare drew on a lost play based on Guthlac when writing his play The Tempest.

== Historiography ==
His first hagiographer, Felix of Crowland composed Guthlac's vita within a decade or two of the hermits's death. Based on textual evidence within the vita, the medieval historian Bertram Colgrave suggests it was most likely written between 730 and 740. Its latest possible date of composition is 749 when its commissioner, Ælfwald of East Anglia died – Felix states in his prologue that he is writing at his king's, Ælfwald's, command. It was written in Anglo-Latin, and follows the traditional patterns for hagiographies. The survival of many early manuscript copies and the use of Felix's text as the source for later vernacular Old English-language adaptations attest the work's influence in the spread of Guthlac's cult.

A short Old English sermon (Vercelli XXIII) and a longer prose translation into Old English are both based on Felix's Vita. There are also two poems in Old English known as Guthlac A and Guthlac B, part of the tenth-century Exeter Book, the oldest surviving collection of English poetry. The relationship of Guthlac A to Felix's Vita is debated, but Guthlac B is based on Felix's account of Guthlac's death.

The story of Guthlac is told pictorially in the Guthlac Roll, a set of detailed illustrations of the early 13th century. This is held in the British Library, with copies on display in Crowland Abbey.

Another account, also dating from after the Norman Conquest, was included in the Ecclesiastical History of Orderic Vitalis, which like the Guthlac Roll was commissioned by the Abbot of Crowland Abbey. At a time when it was being challenged by the crown, the Abbey relied significantly on the cult of Guthlac, which made it a place of pilgrimage and healing. That is reflected in a shift in the emphasis from the earlier accounts of Felix and others. The post-conquest accounts portray him as a defender of the church rather than a saintly ascetic; instead of dwelling in an ancient burial mound, they depict Guthlac overseeing the building of a brick and stone chapel on the site of the abbey.

== Churches and dedications ==
Churches and other places named for Guthlac are predominantly located in the Fens and East Midlands of England, where he was an important saint into Norman times.

The Benedictine St Guthlac's Priory was founded early in the 12th century in Hereford, near the still extant church of St Guthlac at Little Cowarne. The priory was ruined in c. 1143, and relocated to a site near the present St. Guthlac Street, Hereford. It was disestablished during the dissolution of the monasteries in 1538.

=== St Guthlac Fellowship ===
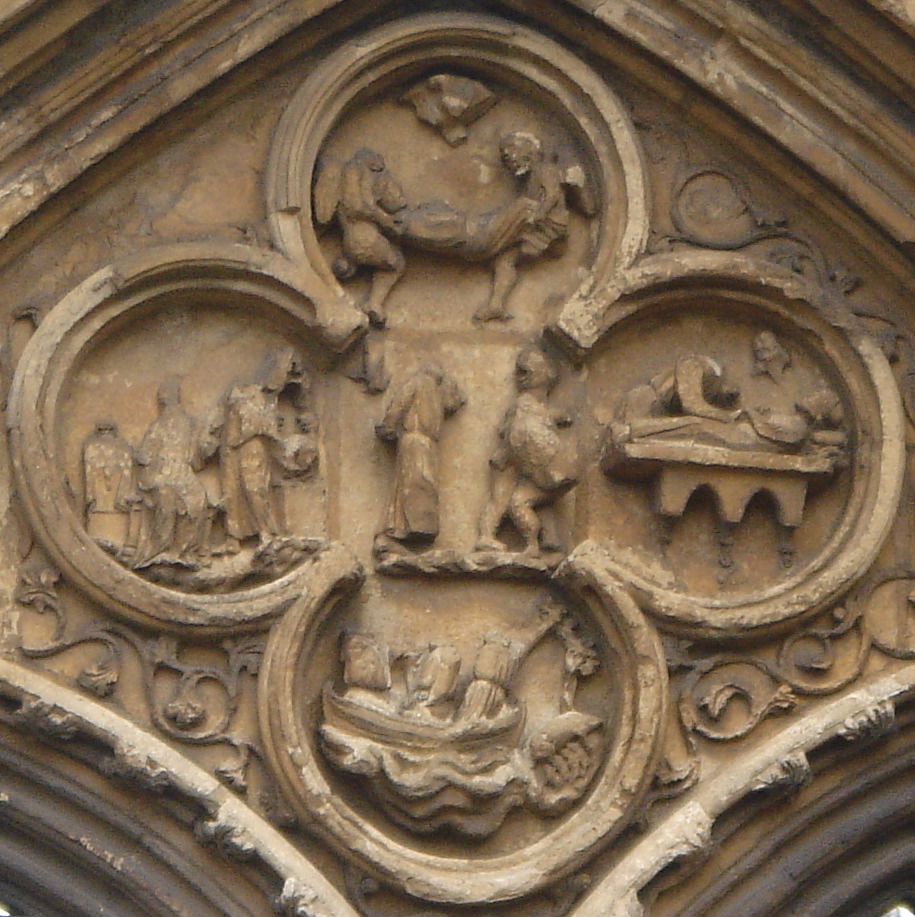
Crowland Abbey's 13th-century quatrefoil with scenes from the life of St Guthlac.

Formed in 1987, St Guthlac's Fellowship is an association of churches sharing a dedication to St Guthlac. Its fellows, all Anglican churches except where noted, are listed below:

- St Guthlac's Church, Astwick in Bedfordshire
- St Guthlac's Church, Little Cowarne in Herefordshire
- St Guthlac's Church, Passenham in Northamptonshire

Located in Leicestershire:

- St Guthlac's Church, Branston
- St Guthlac's Church, Knighton, Leicester
- St Guthlac's Church, Stathern

Located in Lincolnshire:

- Crowland Abbey, in Crowland
- All Saints' Parish Church, Branston
- Our Lady and St Guthlac Church, Deeping St James – a Roman Catholic church
- St Guthlac's Church, Fishtoft
- St Guthlac's Church, Little Ponton
- St Guthlac's Church, Market Deeping

== Gallery ==
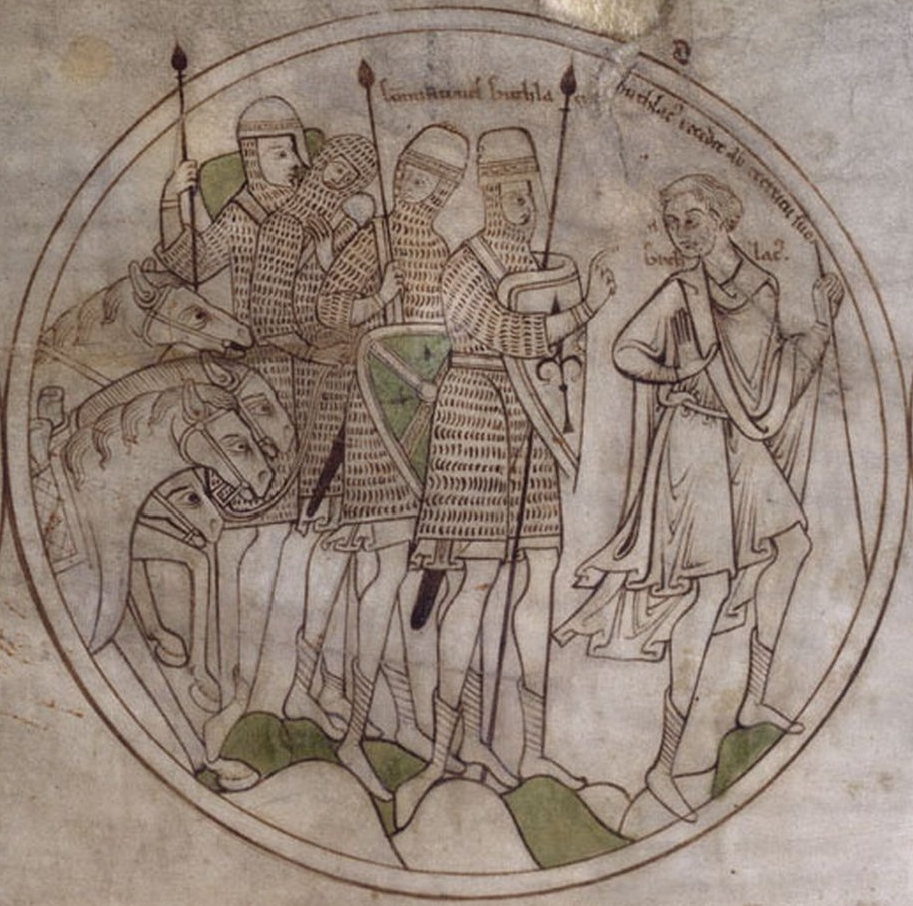
Roundel from Guthlac Roll, 1210: Guthlac in contemplation

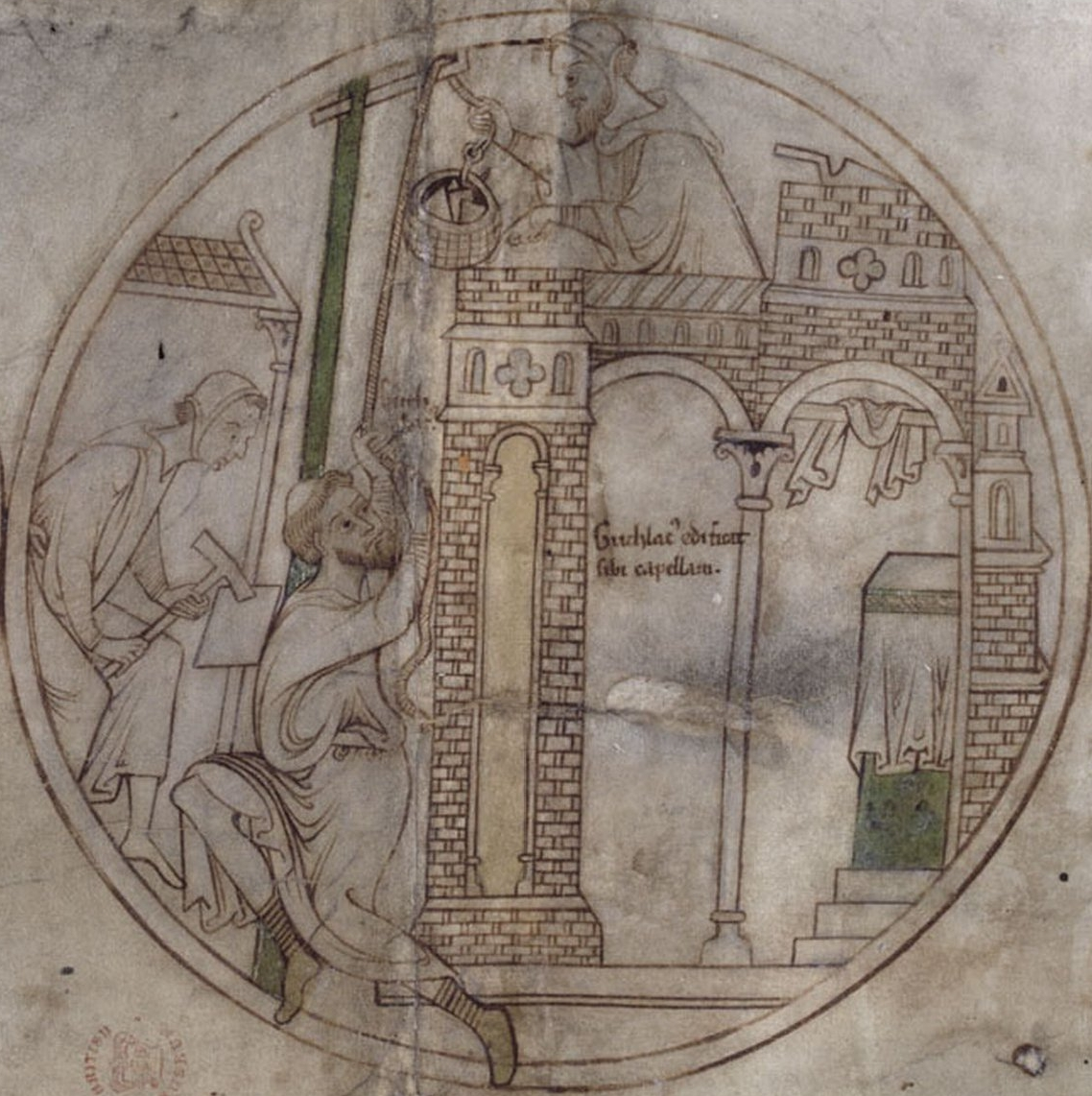
Roundel from Guthlac Roll, 1210: Guthlac builds a chapel at Crowland

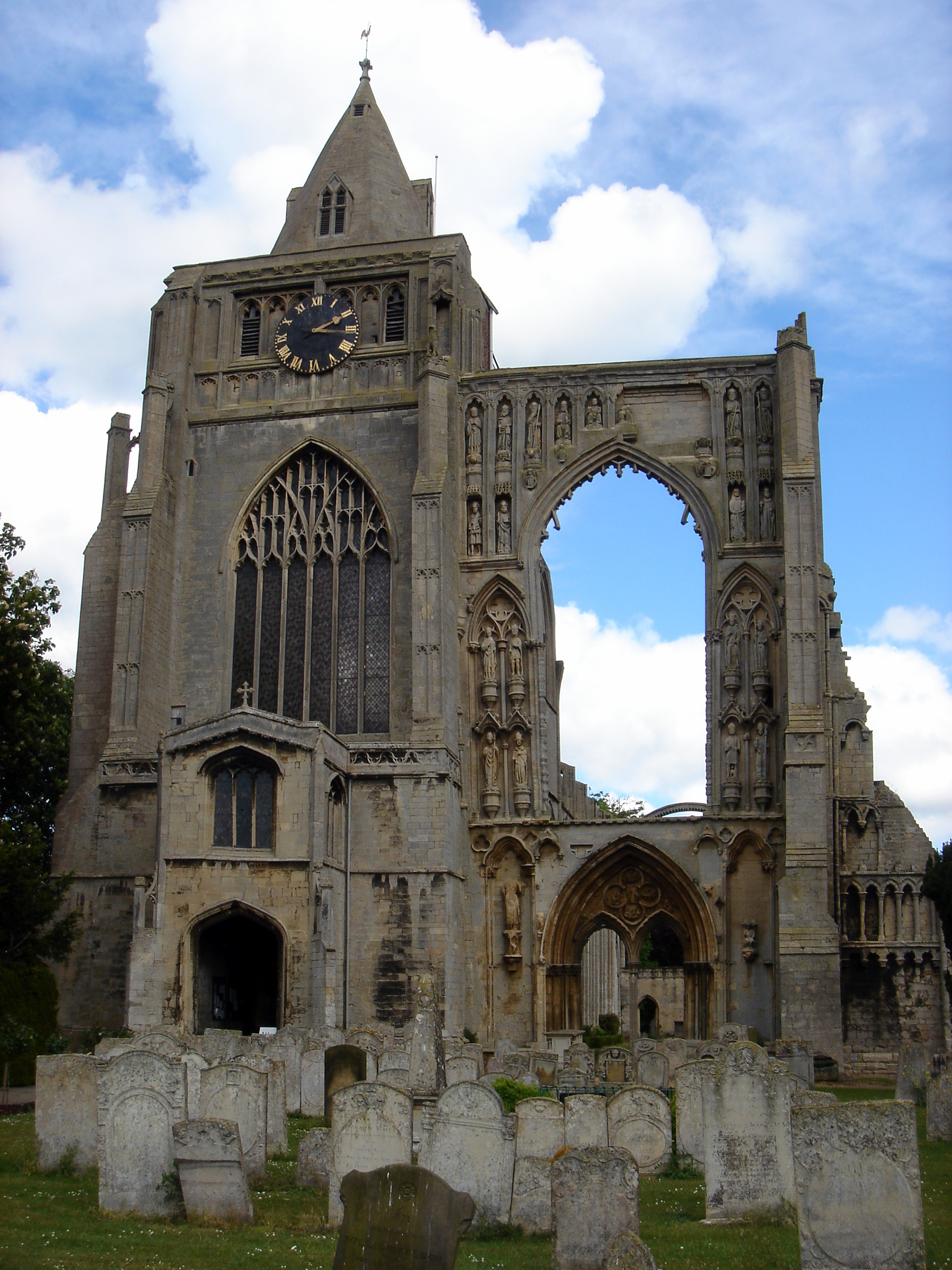
Crowland Abbey

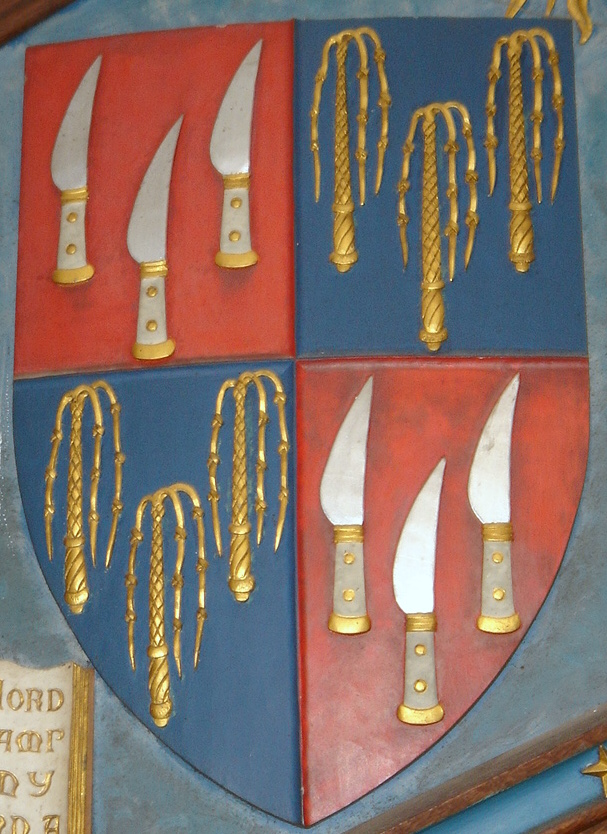
Coat of Arms at Crowland Abbey show scourges and the flaying knives of St Bartholomew

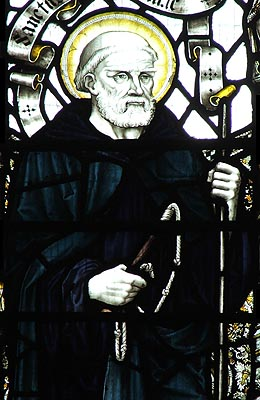
St Guthlac, stained glass, Crowland Abbey

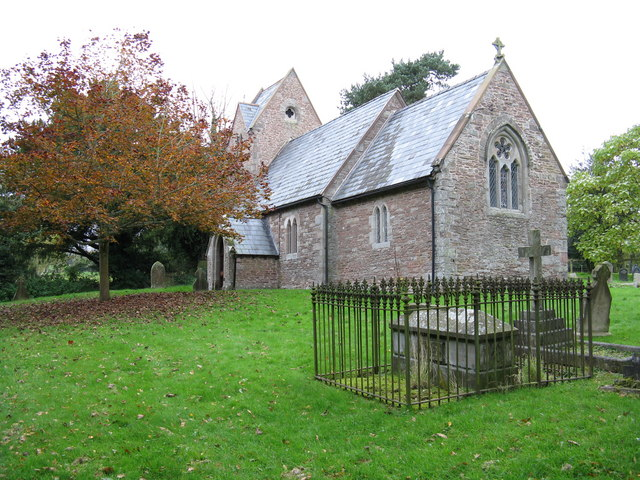
St Guthlac's Church (12C), Little Cowarne, Herefordshire

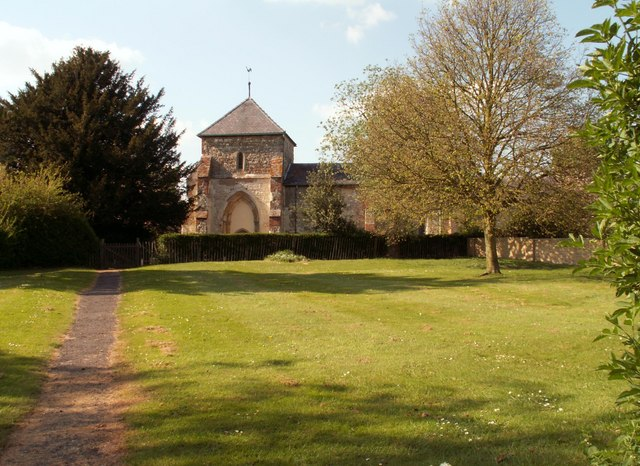
St Guthlac's Church, Astwick, Bedfordshire

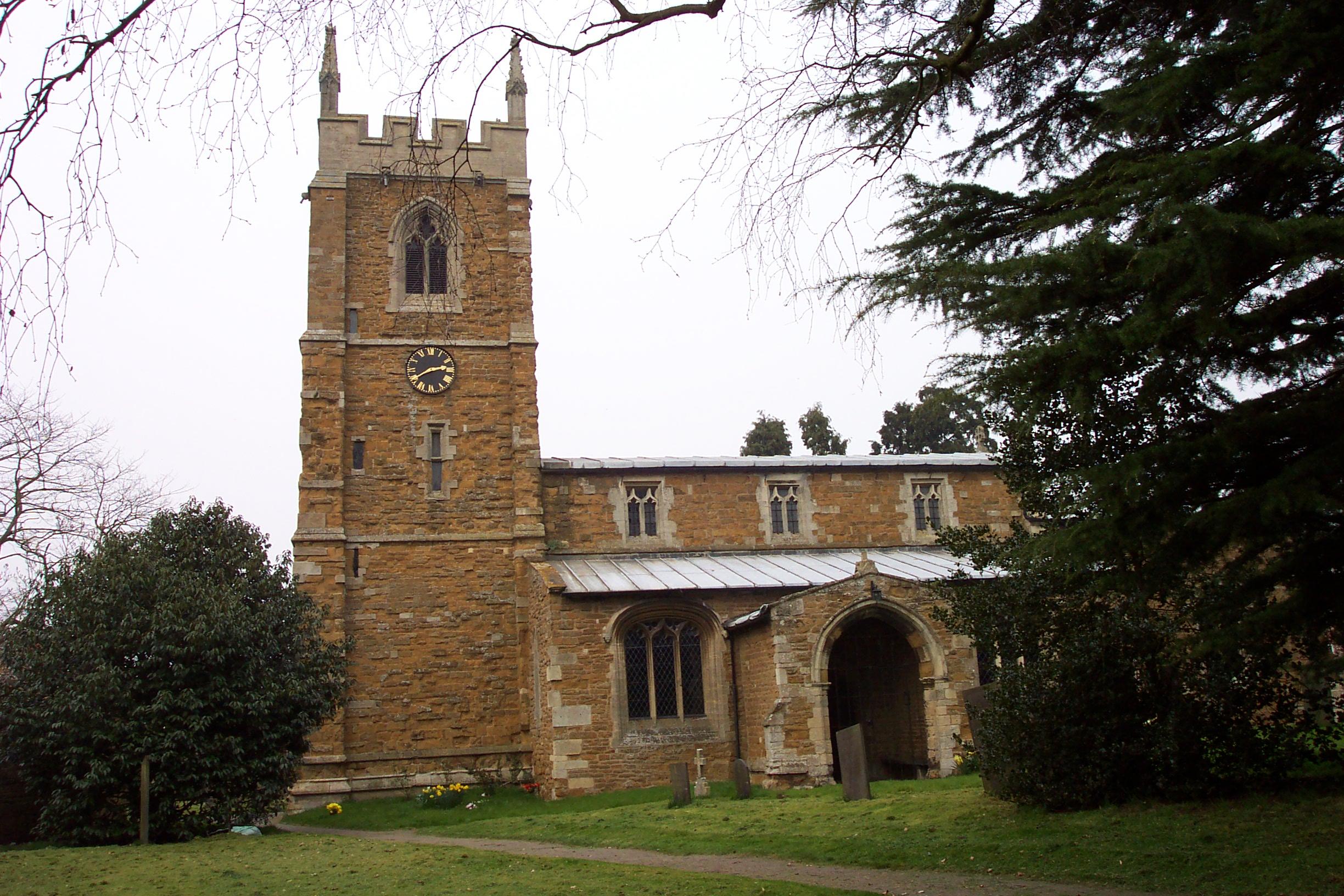
St Guthlac's Church, Stathern, Leicestershire

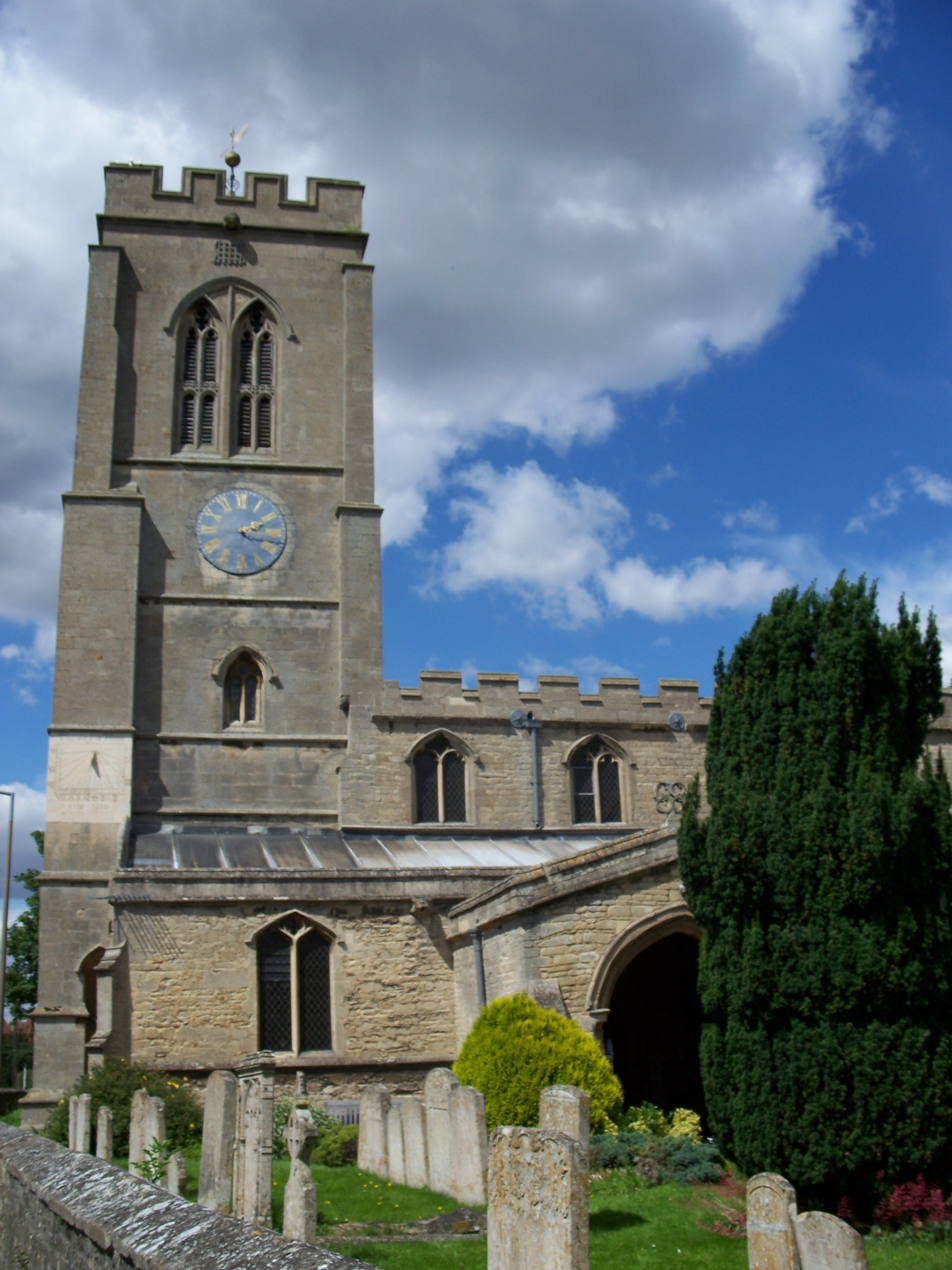
St Guthlac's Church, Market Deeping, Lincolnshire

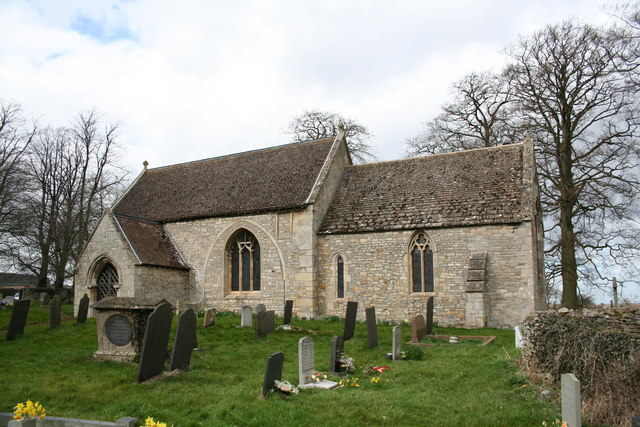
St Guthlac's Church, Little Ponton, Lincolnshire

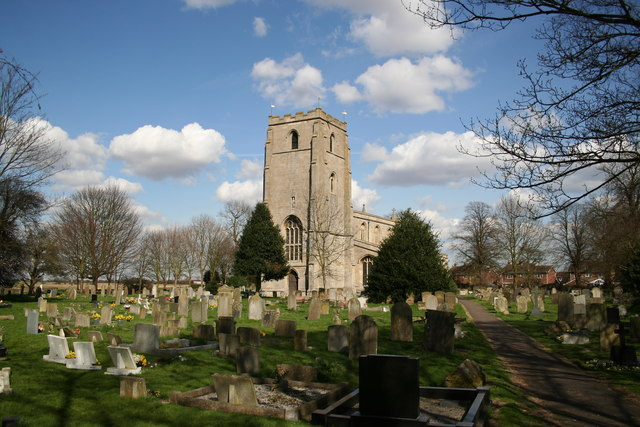
St Guthlac's Church, Fishtoft, Lincolnshire

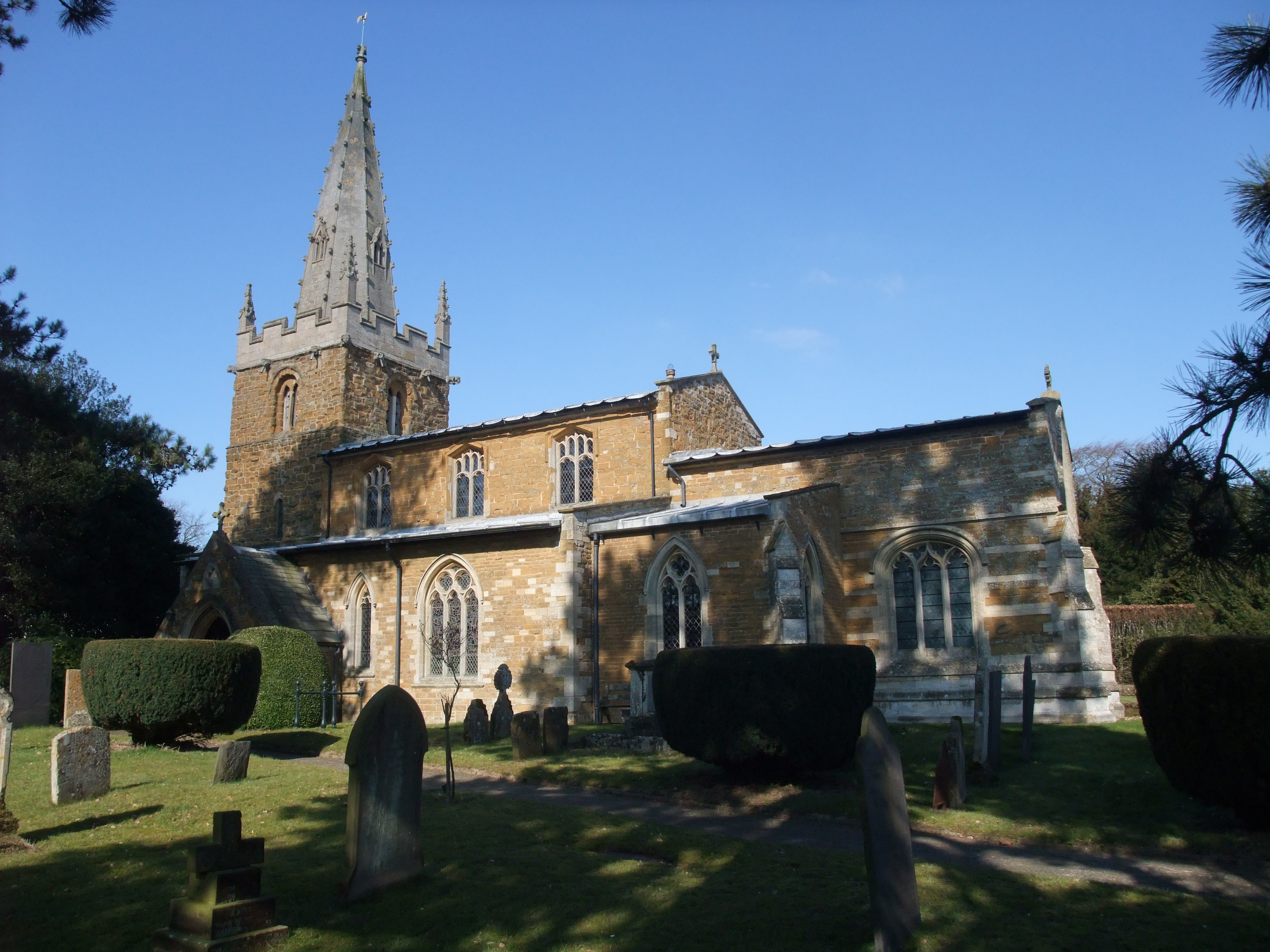
All Saints' Church, Branston, Lincolnshire

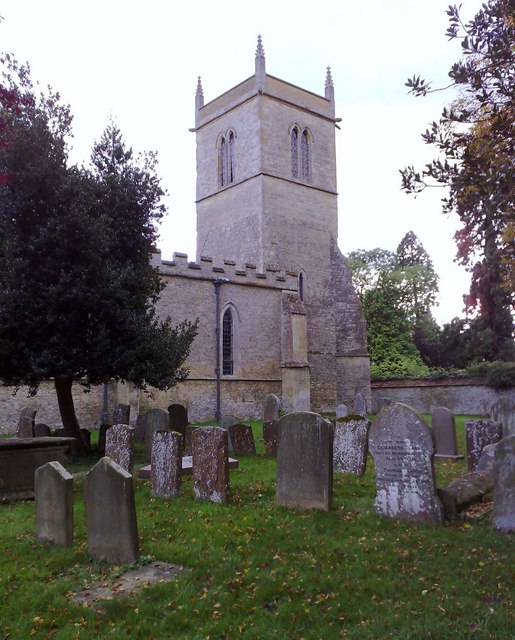
St Guthlac's Church, Passenham, Northamptonshire
