= Ingulf =

Benedictine abbot of Crowland from 1087

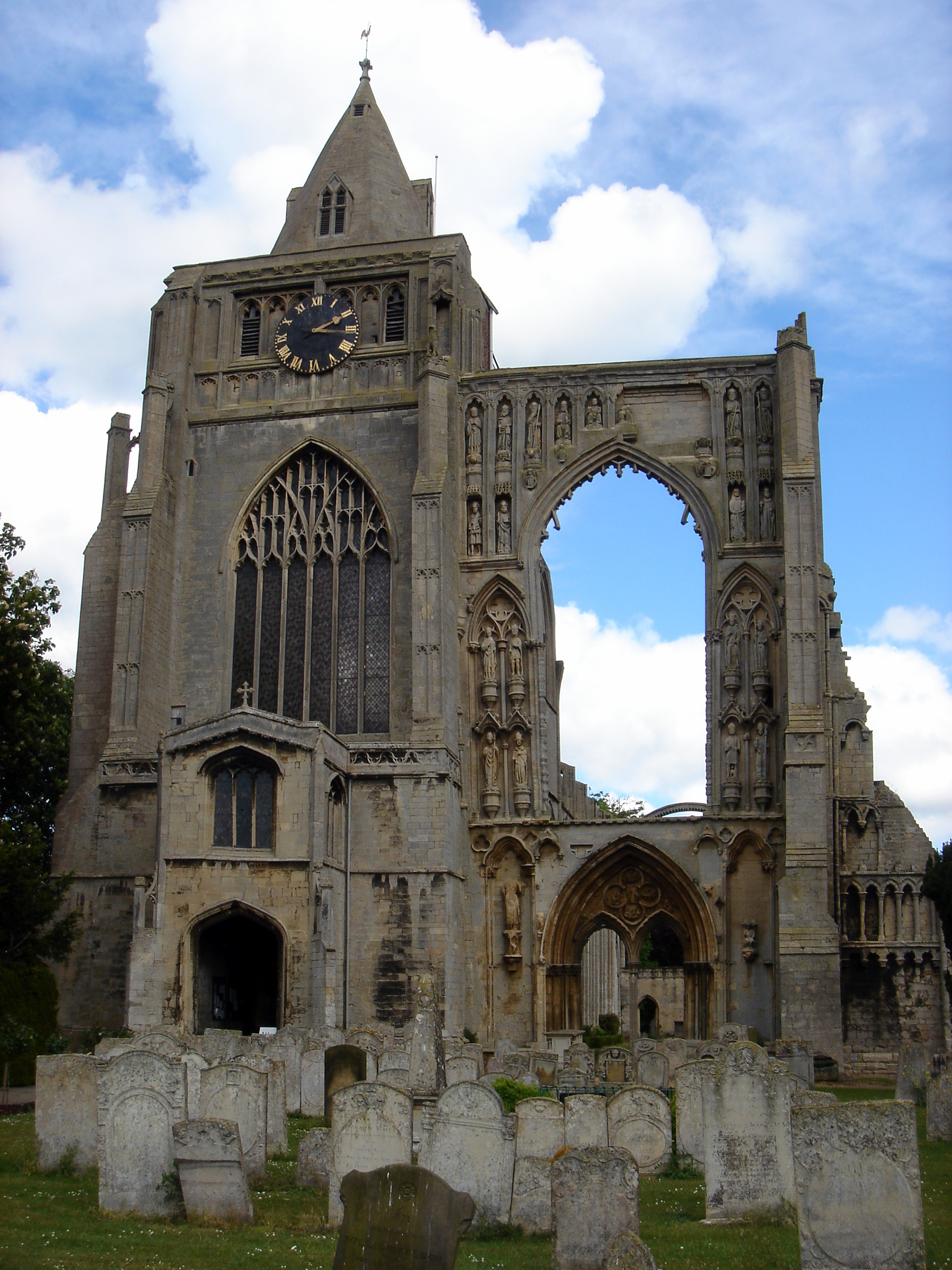
Croyland Abbey.

Ingulf (Latin: Ingulphus; died 16 November 1109) was the Benedictine abbot of Crowland from 1087.

== Life ==
Ingulf was an Englishman who, having travelled to England on diplomatic business as secretary of William, Duke of Normandy, in 1051, was made Abbot of Crowland in 1087 (Chambers and DNB say 1086) at Duke William's instigation after he had become king of England and the abbacy had fallen vacant. 1087 was in the last year of William's reign.

In the meantime, Ingulf had made a pilgrimage to Jerusalem and entered Fontenelle Abbey at Caudebec-en-Caux in Normandy, where after a time, he was appointed prior. He was appointed abbot there in 1080.

As his life as Abbot of Crowland progressed, Ingulf suffered the usual events: gout and the work of rebuilding after a destructive fire in the abbey. However, he was able to obtain an arm of Saint Wulfram; and in 1092 he received the body of Earl Waltheof of Northumbria, an Anglo-Saxon who had been executed per William's orders and who was considered a hero and martyr in popular thought. These relics brought in the pilgrims and eased his money problems.

== Works ==
For several centuries, he was credited with the original authorship of a history of Crowland Abbey, Historia Monasterii Croylandensis, the Croyland Chronicle, a manuscript which has since been shown to have been fabricated well after his time, probably in the 13th or 14th century. The chronicle, which for many years was referred to as 'Ingulf' and is now called the Pseudo-Ingulf, was probably written in order to support claims to property around Crowland, particularly in regard to incursions from Spalding. Crowland was on a small gravel ridge in wet fen. All of the Abbey's arable lands listed in Domesday Book were in other parishes, such as Spalding.
