= Pseudo-Ingulf =

Pseudo-Ingulf is the name given to an unknown English author of the Historia Monasterii Croylandensis, also known as the Croyland Chronicle. Nothing certain is known of Pseudo-Ingulf although it is generally assumed that he was connected with Croyland Abbey.

The Historia Monasterii Croylandensis is attributed to Abbot Ingulph, an 11th-century Abbot of Croyland, but is generally accepted to be a 14th-century work. Those parts of the work written after Pseudo-Ingulf, that is in the 15th century, are considered a valuable source. Pseudo-Ingulf himself is not; while he may have had access to genuine traditions or documents at Croyland, "he misunderstood or garbled these beyond any possibility of recognition".

A number of distinguished 19th-century historians attempted to extract reliable material from Pseudo-Ingulf, notably E. A. Freeman and Sir Francis Palgrave, with limited success.
