= Crowland Abbey =

Former monastery and current parish church in Lincolnshire, England

Coordinates: 52°40′35″N 00°09′55″W

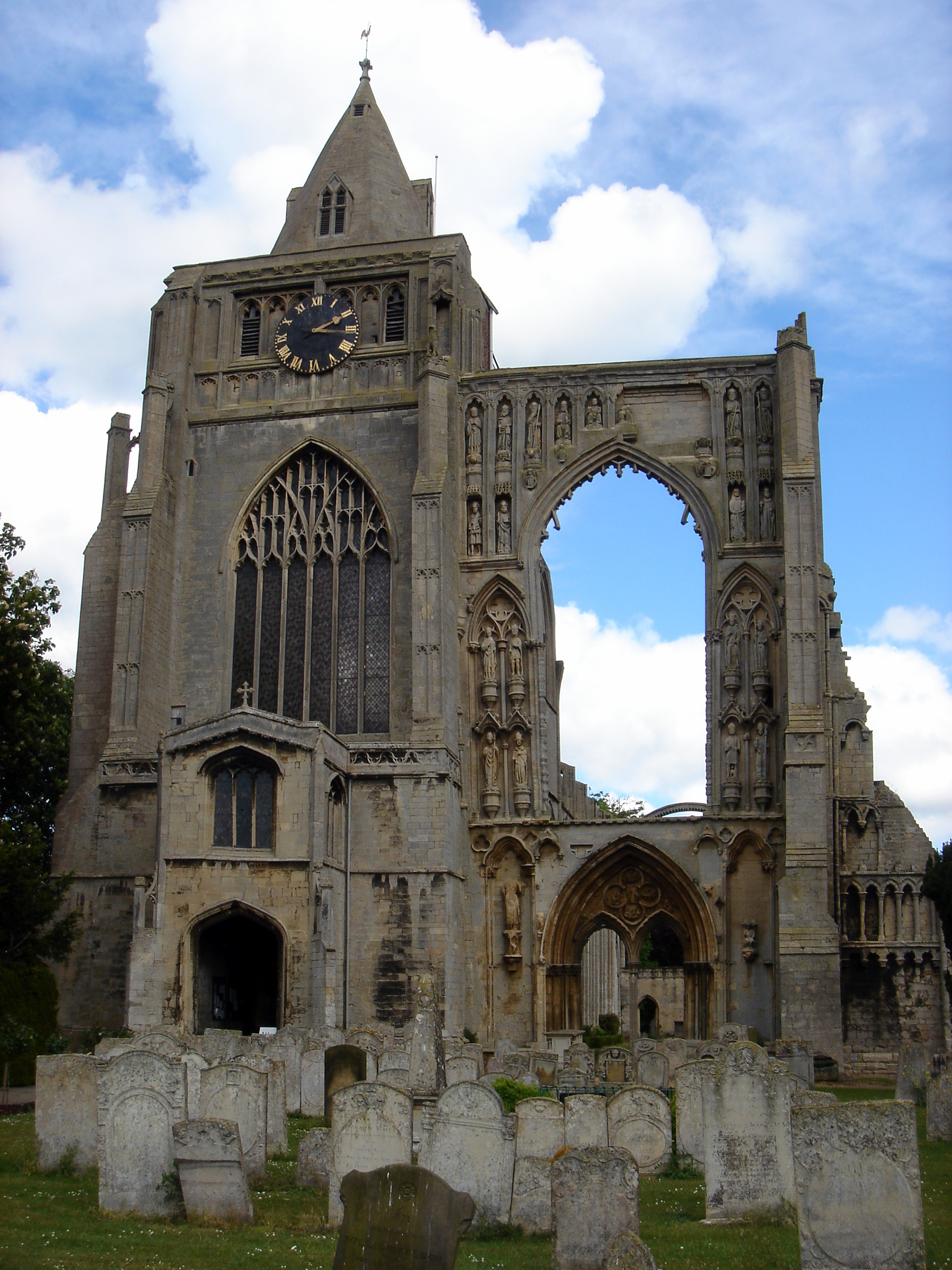
- Crowland Abbey
- Crowland Abbey
- Denomination: Church of England
- Churchmanship: Broad Church
- Website: crowlandabbey.org.uk

History
- Dedication: Blessed Virgin Mary, Saint Bartholomew and Saint Guthlac,

Administration
- Province: Canterbury
- Diocese: Lincoln
- Archdeaconry: Boston
- Deanery: Elloe West
- Parish: Crowland

Clergy
- Vicar: Revd Charles Brown

Crowland Abbey (historically often spelled Croyland Abbey; Latin: Croilandia) is a Church of England parish church, formerly part of a Benedictine abbey church, in Crowland in the English county of Lincolnshire. It is a Grade I listed building.

== History ==
A monk named Guthlac came to what was then an island in the Fens to live the life of a hermit, and he dwelt at Croyland between 699 and 714. Following in Guthlac's footsteps, a monastic community came into being here in the 8th century. Croyland Abbey was dedicated to Saint Mary the Virgin, Saint Bartholomew and Saint Guthlac. During the third quarter of the 10th century Thurcytel, a nobleman, cleric, and relative of Oscytel, Archbishop of York, became abbot of Crowland and endowed the abbey with many estates. It is thought that, about this time, the house adopted the Benedictine rule. In the 11th century, Hereward the Wake was a tenant of the abbey.

Orderic Vitalis and William of Malmesbury were invited to the Abbey in the twelfth century, by the abbot Geoffrey of Orleans, who had previously been the prior of Saint Evroul, following a devastating fire in 1091. While here Orderic not only wrote a monastic history from the time of Guthlac, but also edited a vita of the saint, and composed an account of the death of Earl Waltheof of Northumbria, whose body was laid to rest there. A versified version of the history of Crowland's foundation was made by Henry of Avranches in the thirteenth century.

The location of Croyland Abbey during the 8th century

In 1537, the abbot of Croyland wrote to Thomas Cromwell, sending him a gift of fish: "ryght mekely besychinge yowr Lordshippe favourably to accept the same fyshe, and to be gude and favourable Lord unto me and my poore House." Despite these representations, the abbey was dissolved in 1539. The monastic buildings, including the chancel, transepts and crossing of the church appear to have been demolished fairly promptly but the nave and aisles had been used as the parish church and continued in that role.

During the English Civil War the remains of the abbey were fortified and garrisoned by Royalists in 1642 under governor Thomas Stiles. After a short siege it was taken by Parliamentarian forces under the command of Oliver Cromwell in May 1643, and this appears to have been when serious damage was done to the abbey's structure. The nave roof fell in 1720, and the main south wall was taken down in 1744. The north aisle of the nave was refurbished and remains in use as the parish church.

Crowland is well known to historians as the probable home of the Croyland Chronicle of Pseudo-Ingulf, begun by one of its monks and continued by several other hands.

The church contains a skull which is identified as the skull of the 9th-century Abbot Theodore, who was killed at the altar by Vikings. The relic used to be on public view until it was stolen from its display case in 1982. The skull was returned anonymously in 1999.

The rural poet John Clare wrote a sonnet entitled "Crowland Abbey", which was first published in The Literary Souvenir for 1828 and reprinted in his last book, The Rural Muse in 1835.

== Archaeology ==
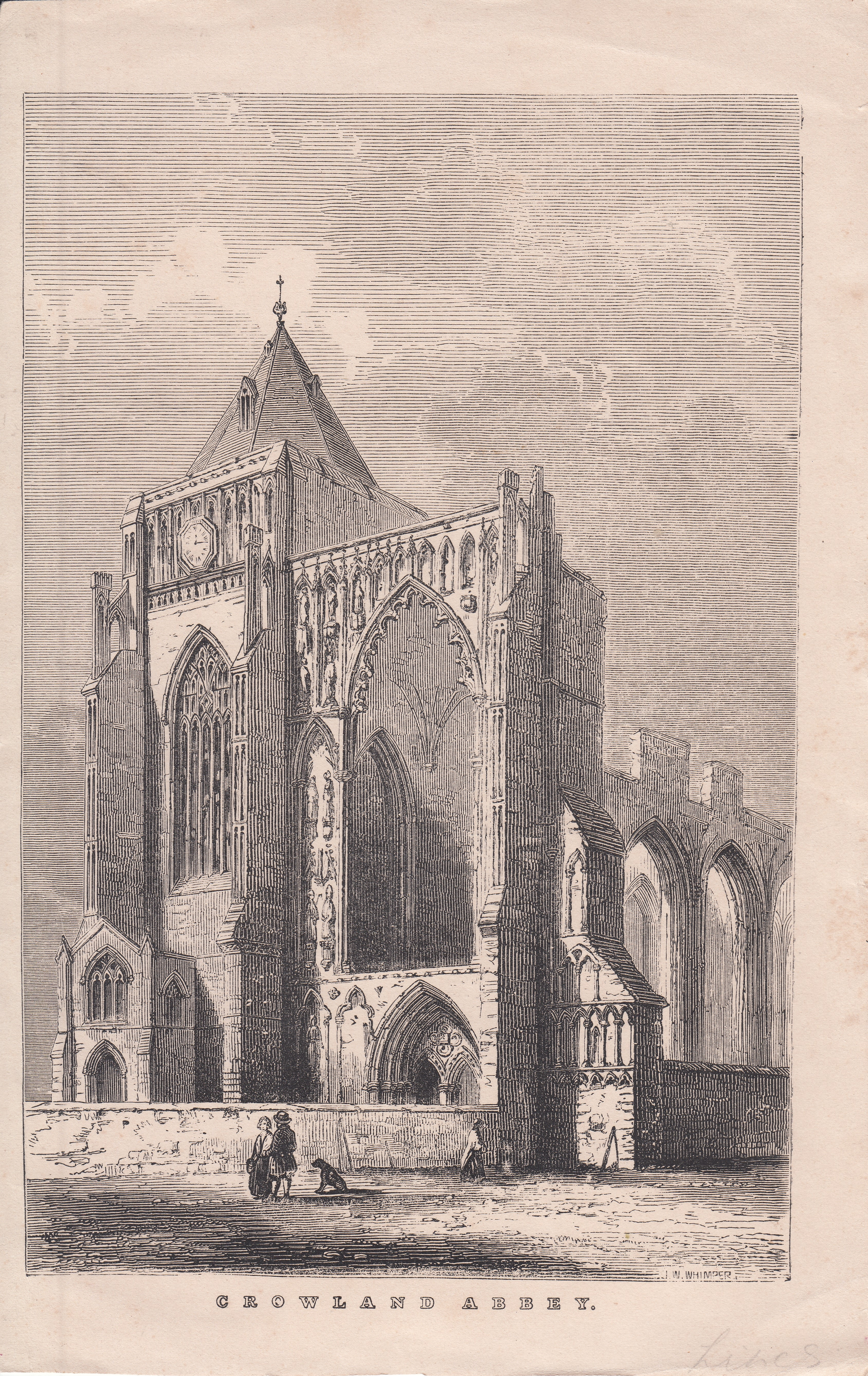

A team of students from Newcastle and Sheffield Universities worked on Anchor Church Field in Crowland for several weeks in 2021 and uncovered some exciting finds – including a high status medieval building. This building was previously thought to represent a medieval chapel, but excavations in 2021 showed it is in fact a medieval hall. This structure would have been used as a residence and was divided into three parts with an ancillary room added to one corner.

== Organ ==
The abbey has a small two manual pipe organ. A specification of the organ can be found on the National Pipe Organ Register.

== Bells ==
Crowland Abbey is claimed to have been the first church in England – and among the first in the world – to have a tuned peal or ring of bells (circa 986). According to the Croyland Chronicle, the Abbot Egelric, who died in 984, supplied the peal of bells:

He also had two large bells made, which he called Bartholomew and Bettelm; also two of middle size, which he called Turketul and Tatwin; and two small ones, to which he gave the names of Pega and Bega. The Lord abbat Turketul had previously had one very large bell made called Guthlac, and when it was rung with the bells before-named, an exquisite harmony was produced thereby; nor was there such a peal of bells in those days in all England.

However, the histories attributed to the 11th-century Abbot Ingulf are now known to be the 14th-century inventions of Pseudo-Ingulf, thus casting doubt on the story.

The chimes of the present bells were the first to be broadcast on wireless radio by the BBC on 1 November 1925. At 90 feet, the 'pull' or ropes are the longest in England.

== Burials ==
- Waltheof II, Earl of Northumbria
- Saint Ælfthryth of Crowland

The churchyard contains the war grave of an airman of the Second World War.

== In fiction ==
- Potter, Jeremy. A Trail of Blood (New York: McCall, 1970)

== See also ==
- List of English abbeys, priories and friaries serving as parish churches
