= A1175 road =

Road in south-west Lincolnshire, England

Coordinates: 52.698°N 0.285°W

A1175

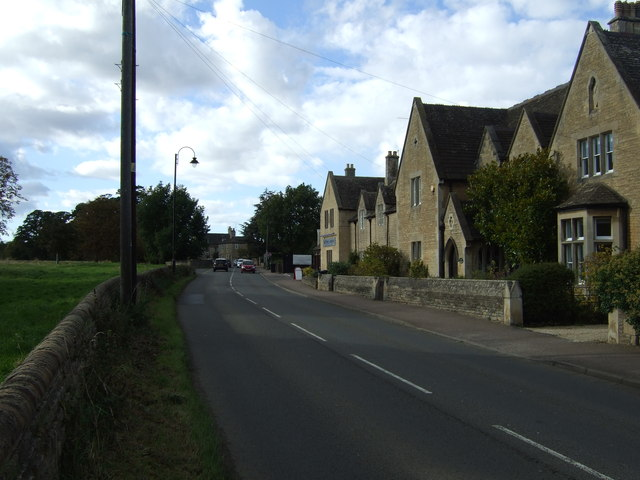
- Main Road, Uffington (A1175)

Route information
- Length: 17.8 mi (28.6 km)

Major junctions
- East end: Stamford, Lincolnshire
- A43 A6121; A15; A16
- West end: Spalding, Lincolnshire

Location
- Country: United Kingdom
- Constituent country: England

Road network
- Roads in the United Kingdom; Motorways; A and B road zones
← A1174	→ A1176

The A1175 road is a road in south-west Lincolnshire, England. It runs between Stamford and Spalding, along the old A16 route.

== History ==
It was previously designated as the southern section of the A16, but is now classified as the A1175 in following the completion of the new Peterborough to Spalding A16 section. The renaming also included a short section of A43 from the Stamford Bypass (A1) into Stamford.

At one time the section from Stamford to Market Deeping was designated part of the A43. The new designation does not regard the route as a trunk.

== Route ==
=== Stamford ===
The A1175 starts as a single carriageway at the A43 junction with the A1 Stamford Bypass, and follows Kettering Road into Stamford to the Junction in St Martins. It turns North as High St. St. Martins, passes over the town bridge (and the River Welland) and turns east along Wharf Road, Ryhall road, and Uffington Road. As Uffington road it crosses the River Gwash, Ben leaving Stamford at Newstead Mill.

=== Stamford to the Deepings ===
Still a single carriageway the A1175 passes through the villages of Uffington and Tallington. At Tallington level crossing, it is crossed on the level by the main London-Edinburgh railway line. The frequency of the trains often causes long delays here. After many years, there are at last plans for a solution. Continuing in a roughly easterly direction the road passes Tallington lakes. The road formed the southern limit of the gravel workings from which the lakes were developed. The road skirts the northern edge of West Deeping where it is crossed by King Street (Roman road).

=== Deeping Bypass ===
The route turns left onto the dual carriageway Deeping Bypass, sharing the road with the A15 Peterborough to Bourne highway, as far as the roundabout for Bourne Road to the north of Market Deeping. From here the A15 departs northwards, and the A1175 heads east, reverting to single carriageway, having the bypass to itself. It crosses the Roman Car Dyke, two examples of civil engineering built nearly two millennia apart.

The dual carriageway ends having bypassed Market Deeping and Deeping St James.

Before the Deeping Bypass was built this road went through Market Deeping and Deeping St James. This route is now known as the B1525. The Deeping Bypass was opened in July 1998, and the whole works, A15 and former A16, cost £10 million.

=== Deeping Fen ===
The whole extraparochial area to the west of Deeping St James was known as Littleworth, and hence the road as Littleworth Drove. But after successful drainage of Deeping Fen in the 18th and 19th century, the village of Deeping St Nicholas was created, and that portion of the road became High Street, Deeping St Nicholas, before reverting to the Littleworth name again at the other end of the village.

The A1175 then, whatever it might be called, leaves the Deeping bypass, still as single carriageway, and passes through the villages of Hop Pole, and Deeping St Nicholas, before crossing the Peterborough-Spalding railway line on an oblique level crossing at the former Littleworth railway station. The route the continues roughly North East past isolated farmhouses until the end of Deeping fen at the North Drove Drain.

=== Cowbit Wash ===
Cowbit is a village a short distance away on the former A1073 Spalding-Peterborough road. Cowbit wash is a low-lying area around the Welland designed to be flooded to protect Spalding. The road crosses this area at its Northern extent.

There is a bridge over the minor North Drove Drain, the road skirts south of the hamlet of Bridge House (named for a defunct public house on the road) and crosses another bridge over the main course of the River Welland. Within a short distance there is another bridge over the New River (an artificial course of the Welland) where there is also a small roundabout.

The small Roundabout marks the crossing with the former A1073 Spalding-Peterborough road, since replaced by the new road which has taken the A16 designation. The former route is truncated to the north, but is still extant to the south as a minor road.

The A1175 continues north-east for around 200m more to its end at the Roundabout, where the A16 Spalding Bypass and A16 Spalding to Peterborough road meet the B1173 local road into Spalding.

== Terrain ==
From Stamford to Uffington the route lies across the gently rolling hills of Upper Lincolnshire limestone, save where the Gwash has cut a valley down the Lower Lincolnshire Limestone. After Uffington, through Tallington to the end of the Deeping bypass at Littleworth, the terrain is flatter, described as river terrace sands and gravels overlying the mudstones of the Kellaway and Oxford clay formations. From Hop Pole onwards, Deeping Fen is formed of tidal zone deposits less than 2 million years old, over the same Oxford clays. This is the true fen, once brackish marsh until drained between the 16th and 19th centuries. At Stamford the road is close to the 50m contour, falling to 22m at Uffington, 11m at West Deeping, and with spotheights of 2m or 3m across Deeping fen to the A16, rising only to cross the Welland Bridge.

The route roughly follows the route of the River Welland from Stamford to Spalding, and actually crosses it near either end, in Stamford and on the Cowbit Washes.

== See also ==
- A roads in Zone 1 of the Great Britain numbering scheme
- The Deepings
- Deeping Fen
