= Newstead =

Newstead may refer to:

== Australia ==
- Newstead, Queensland, a suburb of Brisbane
- Newstead, Tasmania, a suburb of Launceston
- Newstead, Victoria, a town

== Canada ==
- Newstead, Newfoundland and Labrador

== New Zealand ==
- Newstead, Waikato

== Sri Lanka ==
- Newstead Girls College, a school in Negombo

== United Kingdom ==
- Newstead, North Lincolnshire, a former civil parish, now in Cadney
  - Newstead-on-Ancholme Priory
- Newstead, Northumberland, in Adderstone with Lucker
- Newstead, Nottinghamshire, England
  - Newstead Abbey (ancestral home of Lord Byron)
- Newstead, Scottish Borders, the site of the Roman fort at Trimontium
- Newstead, South Kesteven, in Uffington, Lincolnshire, England
  - Newstead Priory
- Newstead Wood School, a grammar school for girls in Orpington, Greater London, England

== United States ==
- Newstead, Kentucky, an unincorporated community
- Newstead, New York, a town

== People ==
- Isabel Newstead (1955–2007), British paralympic athlete
