= Stamford Canal =

Canal in Lincolnshire, England

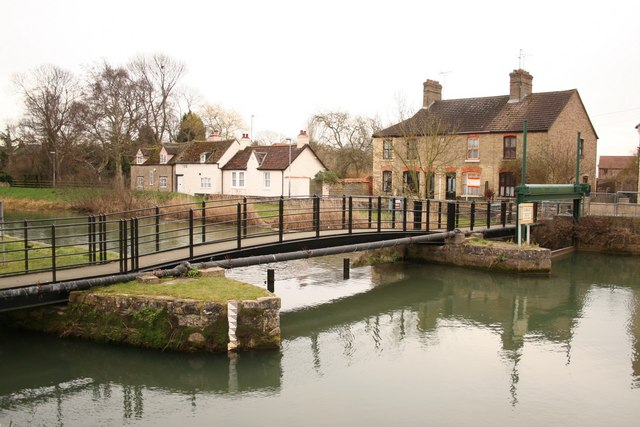
- The remains of Deeping St James High Lock

Specifications
- Locks: 12
- Status: Defunct

History
- Principal engineer: Daniel Wigmore
- Date of act: 1571
- Date completed: 1670
- Date closed: 1863

Geography
- Start point: Stamford
- End point: Market Deeping
- Connects to: River Welland

Stamford Canal, now disused, is one of the earliest post-Roman canals in England. It opened in 1670, around 100 years before the start of the Industrial Revolution which brought about the "golden age" for canals in Britain. Parts of the route can be traced on the ground, though only one lock survives intact. It was part of the Welland Navigation in Lincolnshire. First authorised in 1571, during the reign of Elizabeth I, construction did not start until 1664, under powers granted in 1620 and ratified by James I. It ran for 9.5 miles (15.3 km) from Stamford to Market Deeping and had 12 locks, two of which were on the river section at Deeping St James. No plans of its construction survive, although one of the locks was documented by a visiting water engineer in 1699. It contributed to the wealth of Stamford, allowing barley to be transported to the town for malting.

Plans to link it westwards to the Oakham Canal, northwards to the South Forty-Foot Drain and southwards to the River Nene in 1809 came to nothing, and it closed in 1863, soon after the arrival of the Midland Railway in the area. Although Stamford Corporation attempted to sell it after closure, its ownership was disputed, and they were unable to do so. Its course and some of its structures can still be traced in the landscape. These include warehouses at the terminus in Stamford, and a weir which regulated water levels on the River Gwash, which it crossed on the level.

== History ==
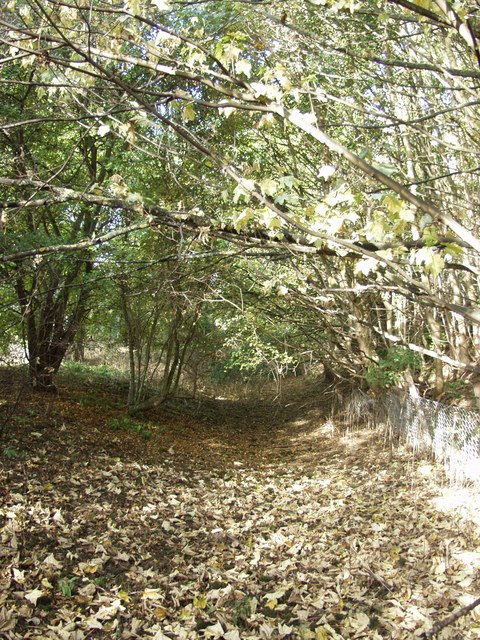
The route of the canal is visible in Uffington Park

The River Welland was one of the earlier on which improvements, in this case to allow navigation to Stamford, were authorised by an act of Parliament. The Welland Navigation Act 1571 (13 Eliz. 1. c. 1) was granted in the reign of Queen Elizabeth I in 1571, and the preamble explained how Stamford had prospered as a result of the river, but also stated that mills built between Stamford and Deeping had resulted in it no longer being navigable, as they had diverted the water. Powers were granted to restore the river using either the old channel or the new one, although it is not clear exactly what was meant by this. There is no evidence that any work was carried out under the terms of the act.

However, the powers were revived in 1620, when Stamford Corporation was given permission by the Commission of Sewers to build a new artificial cut, which would run from the eastern edge of Stamford near Hudd's Mill, to Market Deeping, where it would rejoin the river. The corporation estimated that it would cost £2,000 to carry out the work, and the act enabled them to charge tolls for its use, set initially at three pence (1.25 p) per lock, which could be charged once the work was completed. The decision was ratified in 1623 by a grant of James I, and the corporation expected to have the work completed by 1627. However, they were unable to find a suitable contractor to carry out the work, and failed to reach agreement on terms with David Cecil in 1636, and two other potential contractors after that. Nothing happened until 1664, when an Alderman from Stamford called Daniel Wigmore took the job. He built the cut and 12 locks, which included the High Lock and the Low Lock on the river at Deeping St James, at a cost of £5,000. In return for his expenditure, he was given the lease of the tolls for the next 80 years, for which he paid a rent of one shilling (five pence). The cut was the longest canal with locks in the country, when it was opened in 1670. Its construction preceded the 'canal age' by around 100 years, making it one of England's earliest post-Roman canals.

There are no known contemporary documents describing the design or methods of construction of the canal and nothing about its opening. However, a report from 1632 on alterations to the river noted that 600 men were involved in the work, so presumably there was sufficient labour locally for such tasks. Wigmore probably used handbills at local inns to recruit his workers, since there were no newspapers to carry advertisements. The work would have been done using pickaxes, shovels and wheelbarrows. The excavated ditch was then lined with blue clay to make it watertight. Excavations for a sewer in 1974 and work on a rubbish tip in 1979 revealed the layers of blue clay, and there were clay pits near Stamford, which supported a pottery industry, although their precise location is unknown.

The canal enabled goods to reach Stamford from The Wash, which was 34 miles (55 km) away, by way of Spalding and Crowland. The lower 24.4 miles (39.3 km) used the course of the Welland, after which the two river locks and weirs at Deeping St James were encountered. Beyond Market Deeping, the course consisted of an artificial cut with 10 more locks, by which it reached the eastern edge of Stamford, after which it rejoined the river to reach the town wharf. The length of the cut was 6.5 miles (10.5 km), although the length of the canal is usually quoted as 9.5 miles (15.3 km), to include the improved river sections at both ends. Just below Stamford, the canal crossed the River Gwash on the level. There was a weir on a bypass channel and a sluice on the main river channel, which enabled the river levels to be controlled, so that barges could cross.

=== Operation ===
Trade thrived, for Richard Blome recorded the prosperous Stamford malt trade in 1673, which depended on barley being carried by boat. With the death of Daniel Wigmore, his son-in-law Charles Halford became the owner of the toll rights. In 1695, he was receiving between £400 and £500 per year, most of it derived from the carriage of sea coal. The trade amounted to 3,000 chaldrons that year, and he tried to get the tax on sea coal, which Parliament had approved, reversed. He did not succeed, and failed again in 1706, by which time he stated that the tax had decreased the amount of coal carried to just 500 chaldrons. Besides coal, the canal carried malt and agricultural produce, groceries, timber, slate and stone. Boats used on the canal were small lighters, 35 feet (11 m) long by around 7 feet (2.1 m) wide, capable of carrying from seven to fourteen tons, and normally worked in trains of four vessels.

Although there are no known records from the time the canal was constructed, the lock at Hudd's Mill was documented by Thomas Surbey in 1699. Surbey was a water engineer, and made notes and drawings when he visited it, during a journey from London to York. The lock chamber was 86 feet (26.2 m) long and 11 feet (3.4 m) wide. The gates were hung on stone piers, but the banks between them were of earth. The gates were conventional 'V' gates, similar to modern ones, which included some sort of paddle, but did not include balance beams. Instead, a chain or rope was attached to the mid-stream edge of the gate and to the bank. While this would have made opening the gates possible, it is not obvious how they were shut. The measurements match those of the surviving structures, with the exception of Briggin's lock, which appears to only be 56 feet (17 m) long. There is no visible evidence that it was shortened at some point, nor any obvious reason why it would have been built shorter than all the others.

=== Expansion ===
When the Melton Mowbray Navigation was being planned in 1785, there were discussions of a link to Oakham, which eventually became the Oakham Canal, and onwards to Stamford. The idea of a canal from Stamford to Oakham, 11 miles (18 km) due west, was revived in 1809, with plans for a 7-mile (11 km) link from Stamford to the Nene at Peterborough, and a connection from near Market Deeping northwards to the South Forty-Foot Drain, from where Boston could be reached. A bill for this, together with one for a rival scheme to link Stamford to the Grand Junction Canal, which also included a connection to the South Forty-Foot Drain, were put before Parliament in 1811, but neither met with any success. The idea was raised again in 1815 and 1828, but no further action was taken.

=== Decline ===
With the arrival of the railways, river trade declined. The Midland Railway reached Peterborough in 1846, and opened their line to Melton Mowbray, passing through Stamford, in 1848. Carriage of coal on the canal stopped, as the railways brought cheaper coal from the Midlands. The locks quickly deteriorated, and there were problems with leakage. By April 1863, all traffic had ceased, and Stamford Corporation tried to sell the line at auction, but failed because their ownership of it was disputed.

Since its closure, the canal has largely disappeared but some parts are still viewable on maps and on the ground. The foundations of the two river locks are visible in the Deepings.

The River Welland is currently only navigable to Crowland but plans for the Fens Waterways Link include a new link from above Crowland to above the Dog in a Doublet sluice on the River Nene. There are currently no plans to restore navigation to Stamford. The Dog in a Doublet sluice near Peterborough was built in 1937; the Nene is tidal below it.

== Route ==
Stamford Wharf was the upper limit of navigation, and was situated below Town Bridge, which carries the A43 road over the river at Stamford. There were buildings associated with the canal on both sides of the river, including a large warehouse next to the bridge, parts of which date from 1671, and which is Grade II listed. Barges followed the river down past the ruins of St Leonard's Priory, established in 1090 by the Benedictines, to Hudds Mill, where the cut began, on the north side of the mill. Hudds Mill Lock was almost at the start of the cut. The canal flowed initially to the east, but turned to the north east to cross the River Gwash at right angles. It then entered Uffington Park, where the remains of the weir that regulated river levels at the crossing can still be seen. The Gwash now has much less flow than it did when the canal was active, since the construction of the reservoir at Rutland Water further upstream. The earthworks of the canal continue through the park.

The route of the canal is just to the north of the river, and a public footpath follows it through Uffington Park until it reaches the Uffington to Barnack road. The adjacent bridge over the River Welland has three arches and dates from the seventeenth century but the canal bridge has been filled in to protect its structure. There were three locks in open countryside on this section before the canal reached Tallington where Tallington Village Lock was located just to the north of St Lawrence Church, parts of which date from the 12th to 15th centuries, with later additions. Remains of bridge piers were uncovered during archaeological excavations carried out in 1998 when a water pipeline running from Tallington to West Deeping was installed. No details of the bridge have survived, but the levels suggest that it was probably a movable bridge. The canal then passed close to Tallington Mill, a water mill dating from around 1700, to reach Horse Holmes Lock. A railway line crossed the tail of the lock, but after the demise of the canal, the line was widened, and the lock is thought to be buried beneath the embankment.

The canal then looped around the northern edge of Horse Marsh to reach West Deeping, where there was another lock. There are visible remains of this lock, indicating that it had stone piers at both ends to support the gates, with turf sides between them. It then crossed King Street. An enclosure map dating from 1810 shows that the road crossed the canal by a ford, but that there was also a footbridge to allow pedestrians to cross the canal. From West Deeping to Market Deeping, the canal was close to the northern bank of the northern river channel. There were two more locks in open countryside, and another at the western edge of the town, after which the cut re-joined the river. The final two locks were built on the River Welland, Briggins Lock in Deeping St James, and Low Lock to the south-east of the village.

Points of interest

Point	Coordinates (Links to map resources)	OS Grid Ref	Notes
Deeping Low lock	52.6664°N 0.2800°W	TF164090	
Deeping Gate pack bridge	52.6709°N 0.3000°W	TF150094	
Deeping High lock	52.6717°N 0.3031°W	TF148095	
Thorpe's lock	52.6750°N 0.3242°W	TF134099	
Molecey's lock	52.6747°N 0.3383°W	TF124098	
Eastfield lock	52.6703°N 0.3473°W	TF118093	
St Andrews lock	52.6651°N 0.3608°W	TF109087	
Tallington Horse Holmes lock	52.6615°N 0.3767°W	TF098083	
Tallington Village lock	52.6581°N 0.3882°W	TF091079	
Copthill Turnpike lock	52.6567°N 0.3996°W	TF083077	
Copthill East Farm lock	52.6532°N 0.4086°W	TF077073	
Copthill West Farm lock	52.6515°N 0.4140°W	TF073071	
River Gwash	52.6563°N 0.4519°W	TF048076	level crossing
Hudd's Mill lock	52.6548°N 0.4603°W	TF042074	
Stamford Wharf	52.6503°N 0.4772°W	TF031069	Limit of navigation
