= East Coast Main Line diagram =

UK railway line diagram

The East Coast Main Line is a major trunk railway in the United Kingdom, linking London with Edinburgh. A detailed diagram of the line is housed on this page for technical reasons. There were many lines connecting with collieries etc. branching off the ECML. These are generally not shown.

Where dates for a railway station are shown as e.g. (1853–1959/64) these refer to the dates of closure to passengers and freight. Tallington station is open to freight as of 2008.
