= Peak Hill, Lincolnshire =

Hamlet in the South Holland district of Lincolnshire, England

Coordinates: 52.727846°N 0.128223°W

Peak Hill
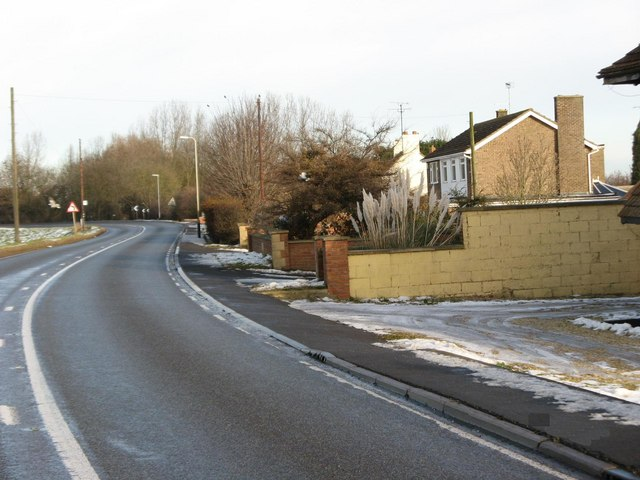
- Peak Hill

- Location within Lincolnshire
- OS grid reference: TF264161
  - London: 80 mi (130 km) S
- Civil parish: Cowbit
- District: South Holland
- Shire county: Lincolnshire
- Region: East Midlands
- Country: England
- Sovereign state: United Kingdom
- Postcode district: PE12
- Police: Lincolnshire
- Fire: Lincolnshire
- Ambulance: East Midlands
- UK Parliament: South Holland and The Deepings

Peak Hill is a hamlet in the South Holland district of Lincolnshire, England. It is situated 4 miles (6 km) south from Spalding and 10 miles (16 km) north-east from Peterborough. The nearest village is Cowbit, about 1 mile (1.6 km) to the north.

Peak Hill is on the eastern bank of the New River (an artificial course of the River Welland), and on Barrier Bank, the former A1073 road. In October 2011 the A1073 was rerouted to the east of the hamlet and redesignated as part of the A16.

The elevation of the village is given as a 5-metre spot height on the Ordnance Survey maps, but the surrounding spot heights are all 2m.
