= Peak Hill =

Peak Hill may refer to:

- Peak Hill, New South Wales, Australia
- Peak Hill, Western Australia
- Peak Hill, Devon, England
- Peak Hill, Lincolnshire, England

== See also ==
- Peaks Hill, area of Purley, London, England
