= Tallington =

Village and civil parish in Lincolnshire, England

Coordinates: 52.66°N 0.38315°W

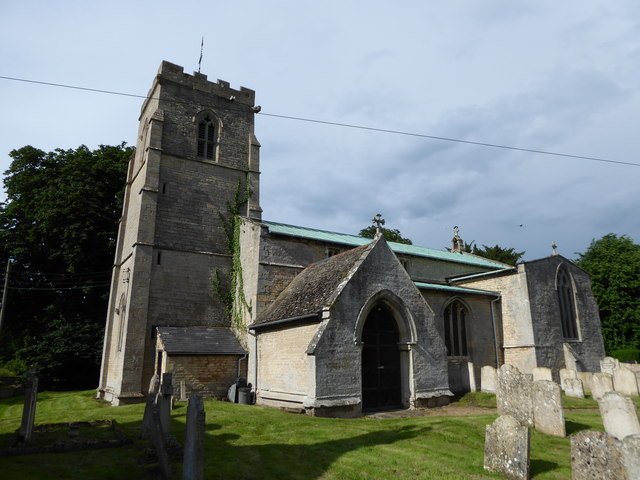
- St Lawrence's Church

- Location within Lincolnshire
- Population: 497 (2011 Census)
- OS grid reference: TF094081
  - London: 80 mi (130 km) S
- Civil parish: Tallington
- District: South Kesteven
- Shire county: Lincolnshire
- Region: East Midlands
- Country: England
- Sovereign state: United Kingdom
- Post town: STAMFORD
- Postcode district: PE9
- Dialling code: 01780
- Police: Lincolnshire
- Fire: Lincolnshire
- Ambulance: East Midlands
- UK Parliament: Rutland and Stamford

Tallington is a village and civil parish in the South Kesteven district of Lincolnshire, England. The population of the civil parish at the 2011 census was 497. It is situated 4 miles (6 km) east from Stamford and 8 miles (13 km) north-west from the centre of Peterborough. The village has around 200 houses.

== Geography ==
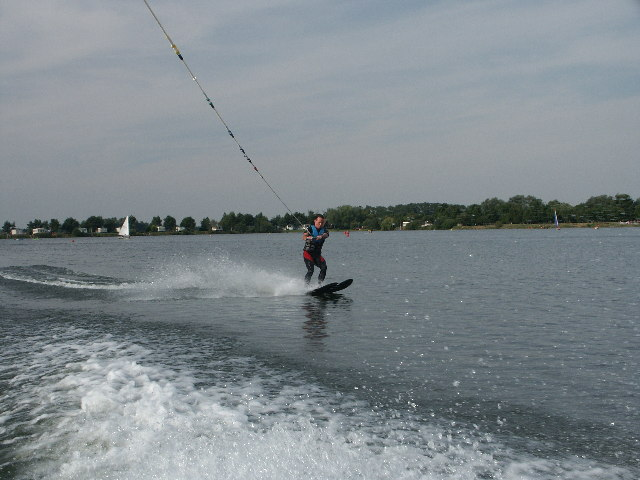
Waterskiing on Tallington Lakes

Tallington is on the main A1175 road (formerly the A16) (for Market Deeping) which runs between Stamford and Spalding. To the west is Uffington. Tallington has a busy level crossing over the East Coast Main Line. Tallington railway station closed in 1959. Since the 1930s there has been a plan for a Tallington bypass and bridge over the railway; even though the village ended up making concrete bridges for many UK motorways (including much of the Yorkshire section of the M62), there has never been a bridge made for the village. Dow-Mac even offered to donate a bridge to the village.

From the East Coast Main Line south-east of the village, the parish boundary follows the River Welland to the west, it meets Uffington and crosses the A1175 a half-mile west of the village at the point where the pylons cross the road, then skirts the edge of Casewick Park. It crosses the ECML a half-mile north of the village, and meets Barholm and Stowe. It skirts the northern edge of Barholm Lodge, across the north section of Tallington Lakes and meets West Deeping at King Street. It follows King Street southwards to the A1175, which it follows to the west, around the western edge of West Deeping, to the River Welland, north of Lolham Mill, where it meets the City of Peterborough and the parish of Bainton.

The Stamford Canal, opened in 1670, passed Tallington where Tallington Village Lock was located just to the north of the church. Remains of bridge piers were uncovered during archaeological excavations carried out in 1998 when a water pipeline running from Tallington to West Deeping was installed. No details of the bridge have survived, but the levels suggest that it was probably a movable bridge. The canal then passed close to Tallington Mill, a water mill dating from around 1700, to reach Horse Holmes Lock. A railway line crossed the tail of the lock, but after the demise of the canal, the line was widened, and the lock is thought to be buried beneath the embankment.

== Local government ==
Tallington is served by a parish council, two district councillors who represent Casewick Ward on South Kesteven District Council and a county councillor representing Deepings West & Rural Division on Lincolnshire County Council. The district councillors elected in 2023 are Rosemary Trollope-Bellew (Con) and Vanessa Smith (Green). The county councillor elected in 2021 is Ashley Baxter (Ind).

== Community ==
At the Tallington Lakes Leisure Park, made from gravel pits, is a dry ski slope and water activities with a campsite. The parish church is dedicated to St Lawrence of Rome and is in the Uffington Group of churches. Parts of the Grade I listed church date from the 12th to 15th centuries. The village public house is the Whistle Stop next to the railway, formerly the Kesteven Arms. The village station closed in 1959. The River Welland and the former Stamford Canal pass across the south of the village. The Lincolnshire county boundary is 100 yards (91 m) to the south.

=== Dow-Mac ===
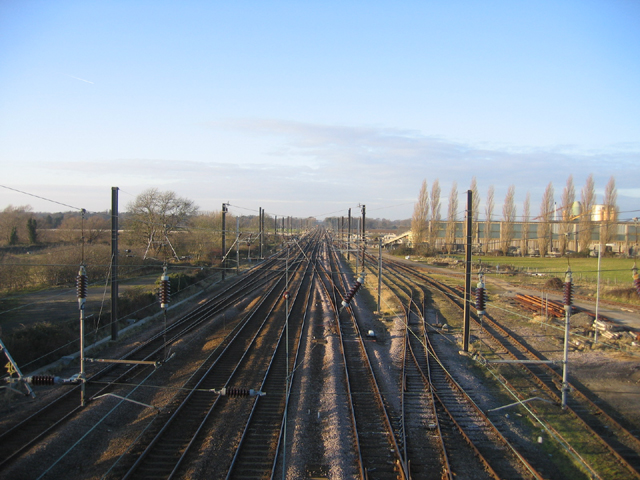
East Coast Main Line looking north, with the former Dow-Mac works on the right

Tallington Lakes are situated directly east of the former Dow-Mac concrete works, and are formed from its gravel pits. Dow-Mac, on Barholm Road, was formed by Harry Dowsett, who lived in Greatford Hall, in 1943 as Dowsett Engineering Construction, later working with Mackay. It made concrete railway sleepers during the war, and later motorway concrete pillars and beams. Prestressed concrete was first made by Dow Mac (Products) Ltd in Tallington.

The site is now known as Tarmac Precast Concrete.
