= New River (Fens) =

Drainage channel in Lincolnshire, England

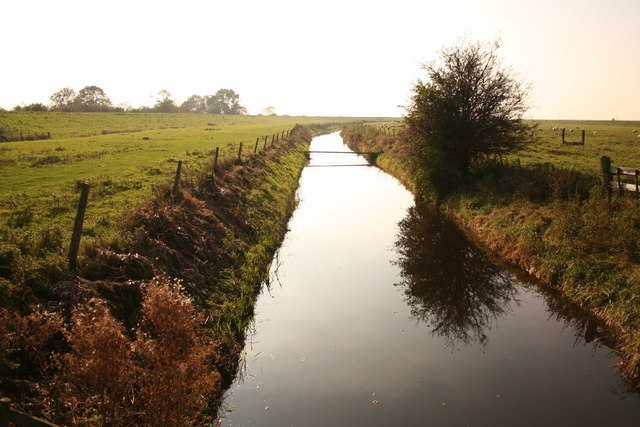
- New River, looking west near Cloot House

Location
- Country: England
- Towns: Crowland, Spalding

Physical characteristics
- Source
  - location: Sissons Farm
  - coordinates: 52.6515°N 0.2582°W
- Mouth
  - location: Little London, Spalding
  - coordinates: 52.7729°N 0.1601°W

Basin features
- Progression: New River - Welland – The Wash – North Sea

The New River is a drainage system in the South Holland district of Lincolnshire, England. Rising just east of Sisson's Farm near Crowland it flows very roughly northwards, following the general line of the River Welland but a little further to the east. It skirts the settlements of Crowland and Cowbit before flowing into the Welland at Cradge Bank near Little London.

Crowland Inclosure Act 1801
- Act of Parliament
- Parliament of the United Kingdom
- Long title: An Act for draining, dividing, and inclosing a Common, called Crowland Common, otherwise Goggushland, and certain open Half-year's Meadow, Commonable, and Waste Grounds, called The Washes and Fodder Lots, in, adjoining, or near the Township of Crowland, in the County of Lincoln.
- Citation: 41 Geo. 3. (U.K.) c. cxvi

Dates
- Royal assent: 23 June 1801

Text of statute as originally enacted

== History ==
The land enclosed between the Welland and the New River is referred to as Washland, Crowland Wash and Cowbit Wash being the principal areas. Washland was designed to be sacrificially flooded as a relief of high river levels. The current land usage, and the rights of the drainage authorities to flood it can be traced back at least to the Crowland Inclosure Act 1801 (41 Geo. 3. (U.K.) c. cxvi), amended by the Lincolnshire Drainage Act 1847 (10 & 11 Vict. c. cclxvii). The arrangement is not theoretical. Cowbit Wash was flooded annually to protect Spalding until the creation of the Coronation Channel allowed excess water to bypass the town. Even now the option to overspill onto the Wash is available.

Although it is customary to say the washes lie between the Welland and the New River, it is more accurate to say that there is an extra bank to the Welland to the south of the New River. It is this bank that restrains the spreading floodwaters: the New River lies in the bottom of this basin to remove the waters. This earthen bank can be seen on the left of the Cloot House photograph above. The availability of a suitable geological feature on which to build this bank determined the shape of the washes, and its location can be traced back through antiquity. Wheeler, writing in the 1890s, wrote:

The right bank of the Welland between Crowland and Spalding is placed at a distance from the channel of the river varying from a quarter to half a mile leaving an area of about 2500 acres which is covered with water whenever the Welland is in flood. The depth of water in this land in high floods is as much as 5 feet. Originally, no doubt, the land by the side of the Wellland was little better than a Morass, and the banks were placed on the nearest firm ground.

Cowbit Wash is around 8 miles (13 km) long from north to south. When it was flooded during the winter months, it regularly froze, and skating championships were held on the ice in the 1800s. Cowbit Wash has not been used for flood relief since the 1950s, following the opening of the Coronation Channel around Spalding in September 1953. However the washes flooded in January 2024 when sections of the right bank of the River Welland breached during a storm. Water levels in the Welland were lowered until repairs could be made, and the Spalding Water Taxi service was cancelled due to insufficient water levels through the town.

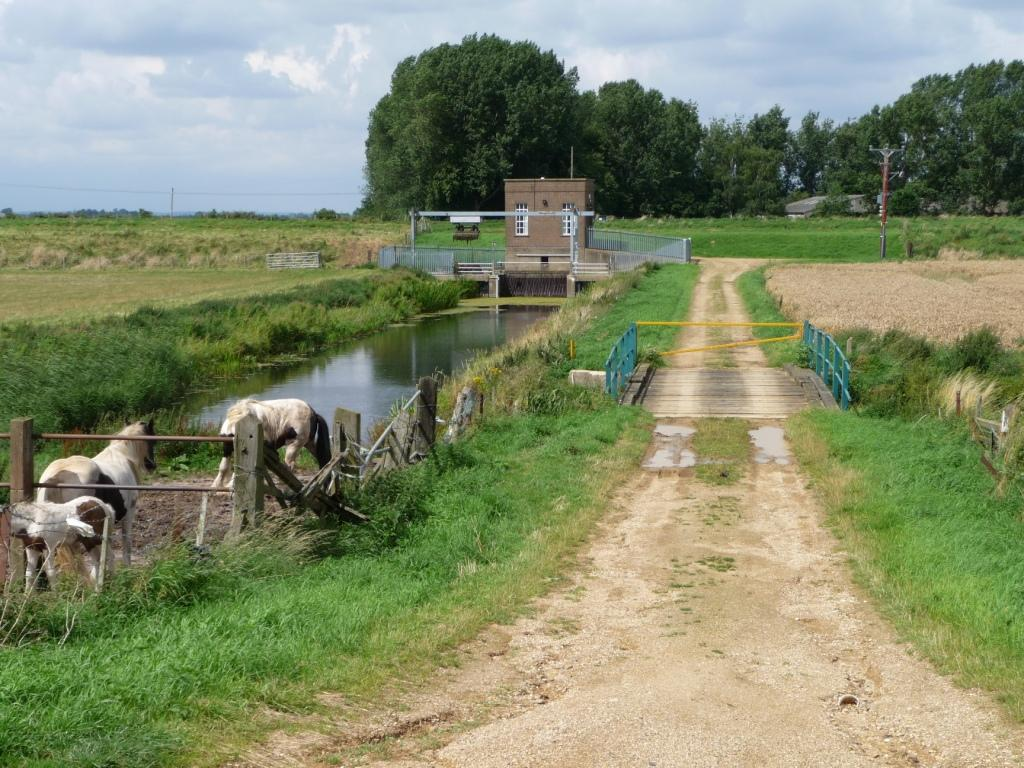
A bridge over the New River, with Crowland & Cowbit Wash pumping station in the background

Once regular flooding of the 2,500 acres (1,000 ha) of Crowland and Cowbit Washes ceased, the land started to be used for arable farming, with crops including sugar beet, potatoes and bulbs. This required the water table to be lower than when it was used for grassland farming. A pumping station was installed at Lock's Mill in 1939, but this was not suitable for draining the washes. The Deeping Fen Internal drainage board (IDB) carried out improvement works to the New River and the main drains that fed into it. They then built a pumping station near Brotherhouse Bar, which could maintain ground water at lower levels than had previously been possible. The station cost £27,000 to build and was completed in 1968. Deeping Fen IDB had been set up in 1939, but in 1973 it merged with three other drainage boards to become the Welland and Deepings IDB. The pumping station has become the Crowland and Cowbit Wash pumping station, and pumps water from the New River into the Welland. It contains two axial flow pumps, capable of transferring 134 Megalitres (Ml) per day.

The North Level District Internal Drainage Board have a pumping station nearby. Postland pumping station was built in 1973, to drain 9.91 square miles (25.7 km^{2}) of agricultural land to the east of the New River. More recently, it has had to handle runoff from urban development in Crowland. The housing developers enlarged the drainage channel to the station, so that it can hold more water, avoiding the need to increase the capacity of the pumps. The station houses three axial flow pumps, powered by 131kW electric motors, which discharge into a 300-foot (90 m) pipeline. The station can transfer 312 Ml per day, and the pipeline carries the water across the washes into the Welland.

== Route ==
The New River begins to the north east of Sissons Farm, close to the confluences between the River Welland, the Maxey Cut, the South Drain and the Folly River. The Welland is navigable below this point, but not above it. The New River heads to the north east, with Corporation Bank forming its right bank. A public byway runs along the top of Corporation Bank. The area between the river and the Welland is called The Wash. To the north of Willow Bank Farm, the distance between the rivers increases, and Kennulph's Stone is located when the widening begins. The stone consists of a rectangular base and part of the shaft of a cross, dating from around 1200, but re-erected at the site in 1817. It is a Grade II listed structure, and the area around it is a scheduled monument. Kennulph was the first abbot of Crowland Abbey.

After Kennulphs Stone, the washland between the rivers is known as Crowland High Wash. Corporation Bank continues until the river reaches Crowland, where it turns to the north. At Crowland, the B1166 road Gravel Causeway crosses both rivers to reach the left bank of the Welland, which it follows upstream. The New River runs along the western edge of Crowland and widens a little. To the north of the town, Wash Bank forms the right bank of the river, with a public footpath running along it. At Crowland Low Wash and Crowland Fodder Lots, the distance between the two rivers is around 0.6 miles (1 km), but the washland then narrows until the New River is running next to the left bank of the Welland. Both turn to the north-east, and there is a land drainage pumping station at the turn. The distance between the rivers then increases again, and at Cloot House the footpath is replaced by Cloot Drove, which becomes Wash Bank once it is running along the embankment.

When the river reaches Brotherhouse Bar, there is a boundary cross near the right bank. This also dates from around 1200, and marked the extent of land owned by Crowland Abbey. It is known as St. Guthlacs Cross, and is built of limestone ashlar. It is a listed structure and a scheduled monument. Historic England call the location Brothershome Bar, rather than the Ordnance Survey's Brotherhouse Bar. A public footpath crosses the river and continues to a new footbridge over the Welland at Four Mile Bar, constructed in 1953 as part of the major drainage works following flooding in 1947. The river turns to the north, and a road runs along the top of Barrier Bank, which forms the right bank. A track called New River Drove runs beside the river, and there are small bridges carrying other tracks across the river into Cowbit Wash. Named ones include Bell Row Drove, Cannonhill Drove, Brownlow's Drove and Tollbar Drove. The village of Cowbit is to the east of the Barrier Bank, and the river turns to the north west there.

As the river turns to the north, Cowbit Wash has been divided by the construction of an embankment carrying the A1175 road. There is a service area by a roundabout on the right bank of the New River. The river continues northwards to Little London, where it enters the Welland through a sluice structure.
