= River Welland =

Lowland river in the east of England

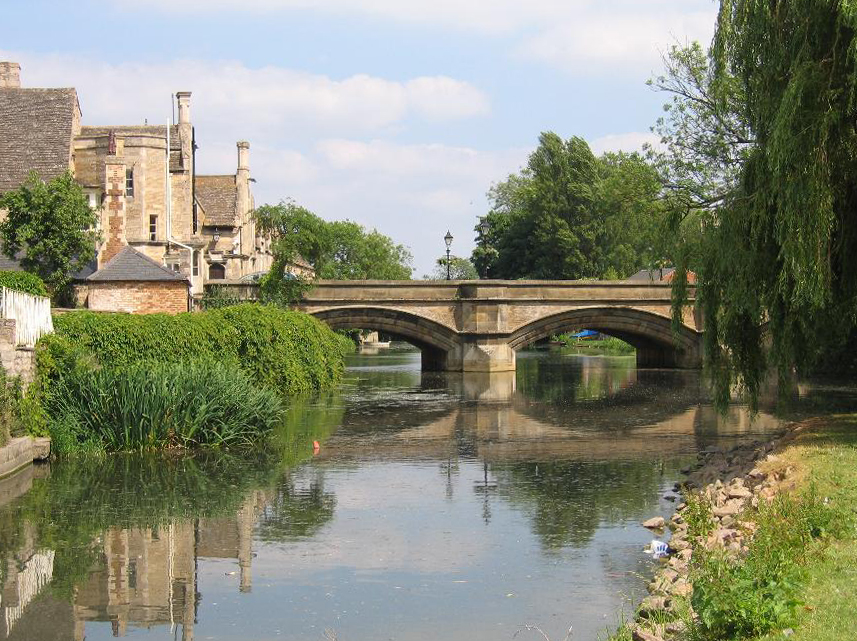
- The river at Stamford

Location
- Country: United Kingdom
- Country within the UK: England
- Counties: Cambridgeshire, Northamptonshire, Leicestershire, Rutland, Lincolnshire
- Towns: Market Harborough, Stamford, Crowland, Spalding

Physical characteristics
- Source
  - location: Hothorpe Hills, Sibbertoft, Northamptonshire
  - coordinates: 52.4399°N 1.0098°W
  - elevation: 157 m (515 ft)
- Mouth: Fosdyke Wash
  - location: The Wash, Lincolnshire
  - coordinates: 52.8983°N 0.0308°E
  - elevation: 1 m (3 ft 3 in)
- Length: 105 km (65 mi)
- Basin size: 1,580 km^{2} (610 sq mi)
- Discharge
  - location: Tallington
  - average: 3.7 m^{3}/s (130 cu ft/s)
  - maximum: 94.5 m^{3}/s (3,340 cu ft/s)

Basin features
- Tributaries
  - left: Eye Brook, River Chater, River Gwash, River Glen
  - right: River Jordan

The River Welland is a lowland river in the east of England, some 65 miles (105 km) long. It drains part of the Midlands eastwards to The Wash. The river rises in the Hothorpe Hills, at Sibbertoft in Northamptonshire, then flows generally northeast to Market Harborough, Stamford and Spalding, to reach The Wash near Fosdyke. It is a major waterway across the part of the Fens called South Holland, and is one of the Fenland rivers that were laid out with washlands. There are two channels between widely spaced embankments with the intention that flood waters would have space in which to spread while the tide in the estuary prevented free egress. However, after the floods of 1947, new works such as the Coronation Channel were constructed to control flooding in Spalding, and the washlands are no longer used solely as pasture, but may be used for arable farming.

Significant improvements were made to the river in the 1660s, when a new cut with 10 locks was constructed between Stamford and Market Deeping, and two locks were built on the river section below Market Deeping. The canal section was known as the Stamford Canal, and was the longest canal with locks in Britain when it was built. The river provided the final outlet to the sea for land drainage schemes implemented in the seventeenth century, although they were not completely successful until a steam-powered pumping station was built at Pode Hole in 1827. Navigation on the upper river, including the Stamford Canal, had ceased by 1863, but Spalding remained an active port until the end of the Second World War.

The Environment Agency is the navigation authority for the river, which is navigable as far upstream as Crowland, and with very shallow draught to West Deeping Bridge, where further progress is hindered by the derelict lock around the weir. The traditional head of navigation was Wharf Road in Stamford. The management of the lower river has been intimately tied up with the drainage of Deeping Fen, and the river remains important to the Welland and Deepings Internal Drainage Board, for whom it provides the final conduit to the sea for pumped water.

Wildlife in the river varies along its length, the faster headwaters being a habitat for trout and the slower lower reaches for perch. The estuary conditions and flat landscapes beyond Fosdyke favour wading birds and migratory species.

== Geography ==
The River Welland, with its tributaries, forms a river system with a catchment area of 609 square miles (1,580 km^{2}). Within this area, 257 miles (414 km) of waterway are designated as "main river", and are therefore managed for flood control by the Environment Agency under the River Welland Catchment Flood Management Plan (CFMP). Of this total, the 14 miles (23 km) below Spalding are tidal, and have sea walls to protect the adjacent land from flooding, while 56 miles (90 km) are fresh water, but run through low-lying land, and are therefore embanked. Within the catchment area, 179 square miles (460 km^{2}) are below sea level, and would be flooded without such defences.

The basin runs in a broadly south-west to north-east direction, with an extension to the north around the West Glen and East Glen rivers. The underlying geology consists of Lias clays at the western end of the catchment, with Lincolnshire limestone in the centre, including the valleys of the Glen. The eastern third is mostly alluvial soils, and it is this part that relies on artificial pumping to prevent flooding. Rainfall over the area varies between 26 and 30 inches (660 and 760 mm) per year, which is quite light, and because the land is efficiently drained during the winter months, there are few reserves, making the area prone to drought in the summer months.

For much of its length the Welland forms the county boundary between Northamptonshire and Leicestershire or Rutland, and lower down between Lincolnshire and Cambridgeshire.

== Course ==
The Welland rises in the Hothorpe Hills in the parish of Sibbertoft, Northamptonshire and it issues at Spring Croft, Church Street. Sibbertoft sits astride one of the principal watersheds in England. Within 2 miles (3.2 km), the small stream forms the border between Northamptonshire and Leicestershire. It flows westwards, before looping round, passing through the grounds of Hothorpe Hall in Theddingworth, now a conference centre, to flow generally eastwards through Lubenham to Market Harborough. One of the driveways to Thorpe Lubenham Hall is carried over the river by an early nineteenth century ashlar bridge which is a Grade II listed structure. To the east of Lubenham, the river passes Old Lubenham Hall, part of an H-plan house built in the late sixteenth century and modified in the early eighteenth century. King Charles I is believed to have stayed there before the Battle of Naseby. Three arms of a square moat surround the house, and the site is a scheduled ancient monument.

=== Market Harborough to Stamford ===
The county border leaves the river on the west side of Market Harborough, as the town is wholly in Leicestershire, and picks it up again on the east side. The River Jordan joins the Welland in the centre of Market Harborough, flowing northwards to the railway station. Langton Brook and Stonton Brook join from the west near Welham. The county border meanders from side to side across relatively straight sections of the river, suggesting that the channel has been engineered. A three-arched bridge, built in 1881 of fine ashlar masonry, with a causeway to the south, carries the Welham to Weston by Welland road over the river, while a four-arched bridge dating from the early nineteenth century carries the Ashley to Medbourne road. Macmillan Way, a long-distance footpath, crosses on its way from Abbotsbury in Dorset to Boston, Lincolnshire. Medbourne Brook joins from the north, after which the river approaches a dismantled railway and is joined by the Stoke Albany Brook, approaching from the south. The river remains on the south side of the railway, while the county border follows a meandering course to the north of it, but rejoins the river near the Bringhurst to Cottingham road. The bridge over the river is plain, but to the north of it is an eighteenth-century causeway, some 110 yards (100 m) long, which is made of stone and pierced by seven large arches and numerous smaller arches for drainage pipes. The causeway has two large semi-circular passing places on its western side.

The Welland passes to the north of Corby near Rockingham, and then to the south of Caldecott, where it becomes the county border between Northamptonshire and Rutland, and the Eye Brook, which has been dammed to form the Eyebrook Reservoir, joins from the north. As it flows past Harringworth, the river forms two channels, with the county border following the smaller, northern channel. It is crossed by the 1,275-yard (1,166 m) Welland Viaduct, with its 82 brick arches, which was completed in 1879, and carries the Oakham to Kettering Line over the valley. Apart from viaducts carrying suburban lines into London, it is the longest railway viaduct to be built in Britain. Uppingham Brook flows eastwards from Uppingham to join on the north bank, and the Jurassic Way long-distance footpath crosses the river at Turtle Bridge. This probably dates from the fourteenth century, although it was widened in 1793, and a parapet has been added subsequently. On the road from Barrowden to Wakerley, there is a medieval bridge with five pointed arches, which was widened in the eighteenth century. Fineshade Brook flows from the south to join the river near Duddington, where there is a well-known mill building of earliest known date 1664. A limestone ashlar bridge with four arches crosses the river, dating from the fifteenth century but widened in 1919. After the river passes under a railway bridge at Ketton, its flow is swelled by the River Chater. The county border again leaves the river to the west of Stamford while below the town the river forms the border between Lincolnshire and Cambridgeshire.

=== Stamford to Spalding ===
Just before Stamford, the Great North Road, now labelled the A1, crosses the river, and a pumping station on the north bank at Stamford Meadows has pumped large quantities of water to the Rutland Water reservoir since its construction in 1975. Stamford was the lowest point at which the river could be forded so the Roman Ermine Street crossed the Welland there. The A16 road crosses the river by a three-arched stone bridge designed by Edward Browning in 1845. Below it, Albert Bridge is made of iron with stone piers, and was erected by Stamford Town Council in July 1881, to replace an earlier bridge which was washed away in a flood. Beyond Stamford, the river passes the site and ruins of the Benedictine St Leonard's Priory. Hudd's Mill marks the point at which the Stamford Canal left the river. The present mill building dates from 1751 and 1771. The River Gwash, which the canal crossed on the level, joins from the north, and the remains of the canal follow the river on its north bank. Below Uffington, the county border follows the old course of the river, first to the south to Tallington and then to the north, while the main course now flows along the Maxey Cut to Peakirk. The old course consists of two streams, fed by sluices from the Maxey Cut, which meander to The Deepings. The eastern stream supplied power to Lolham and Maxey mills, while the western stream did the same for Tallington Mill, which dates from around 1700, West Deeping mill, and Molecey's mill, which still retains its seventeenth-century undershot waterwheel, modified in the 19th century to Poncelet's improved design, and the only surviving waterwheel of its type in Lincolnshire. At the western edge of Market Deeping the two streams join, and they are also joined by the Greatford Cut, which has carried the diverted waters of the West Glen river since the early 1950s.

This section is crossed by King Street, which follows the course of a Roman road. Where it crosses the Maxey Cut, to the south of the original channels, there are a series of 14 arches which comprise Lolham Bridges. They are grouped into five structures to cross the channels in the area, and were funded by the County of Northamptonshire in the seventeenth and eighteenth centuries. The longest span is 16 feet (4.9 m), and the cutwaters carry inscribed stones recording the county's involvement. To the north, an early nineteenth-century stone rubble arched bridge carries the road over a drainage ditch near Lolham Mill, while an eighteenth-century bridge, probably rebuilt in the following century, crosses the mill stream. Another pair of early nineteenth-century bridges, built of coursed limestone with ashlar dressings, carry the road over the northernmost channel.

The bridge at Deeping Gate carries the date 1651, and is a Grade II* listed stone structure with three round arches. After the remains of Deeping High lock and Deeping Low lock, there is a junction where the old course, the Maxey Cut, the South Drain and the Folly River, also a drain, meet. The river is officially navigable below this point. Through Crowland and Cowbit to the edge of Spalding, the river is laid out with washlands, which were historically used as pasture, because the river was allowed to flood the land when tidal levels prevented the water discharging into the sea. The river is bounded on the north and west by a bank, while the New River, a drainage channel to the south and east of it, is bounded by another bank. The land between the channels forms Crowland High Wash, Crowland Fodder Lots and Cowbit Wash. The southern bank is variously named Corporation Bank, Wash Bank and Barrier Bank. These washlands were designed to be flooded in extremis, although the building of the Coronation flood relief channel has made this purpose obsolete.

=== Spalding to Fosdyke Bridge ===
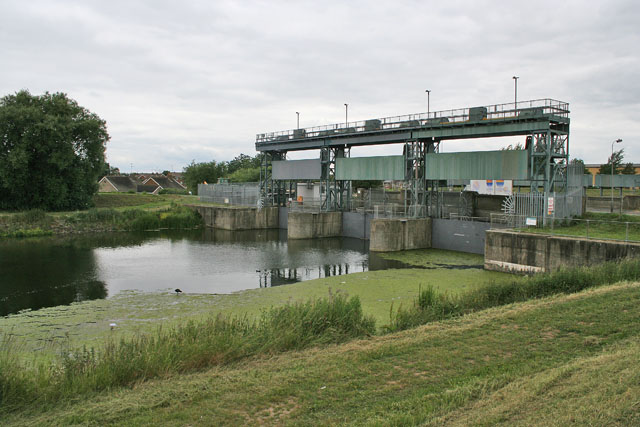
The Coronation Channel and Marsh Road Sluice, Spalding

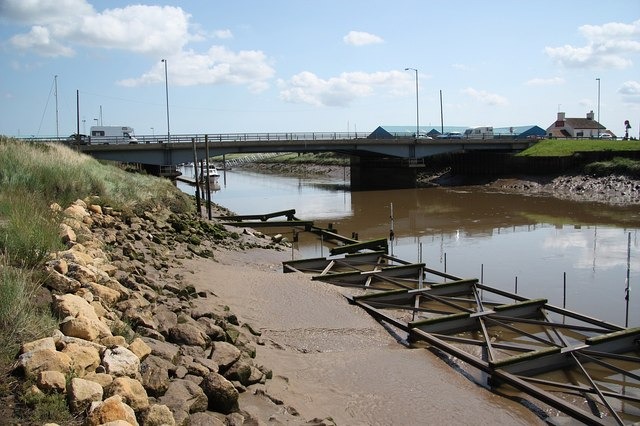
The last bridge over the Welland which carries the A17 before it goes out into the Wash at Fosdyke

Beyond the river banks, much of the fertile arable land is composed of marine silt, which suits the bulb-growing for which Spalding is famous. The commercial growing of bulbs was pioneered in the 1880s, with the first large-scale tulip fields introduced by Sam Culpin in 1907. At its peak in 1939, there were 10,000 acres (4,000 ha) of bulb fields, and 3000 tons of flowers were exported through Spalding railway station. Tulips were grown on around 3,000 acres (1,200 ha) in 1965, but this had reduced to less than 1,000 acres (400 ha) by 1999.

Passing through Spalding, where most of the flow is diverted through the Coronation channel, the town is protected by Marsh Road sluice and a sea lock to the east. Below the town, it is approached by Vernatt's Drain, which runs parallel to the river carrying water pumped from Deeping Fen, and is crossed by the A16 road bridge. Nearby is Pinchbeck Marsh Pumping Station, which houses the last beam engine and scoop wheel to be used in the Fens for land drainage. It was built in 1833, and ran until 1952, when it was replaced by electric pumps. It now forms part of a museum of land drainage run by the Welland and Deepings Internal Drainage Board, in partnership with South Holland District Council. Vernatt's Drain passes through a sluice to join the river, while the sluice that protects the entrance to the River Glen is navigable, to allow boats to reach Tongue End, some 11.5 miles (18.5 km) upstream from its mouth. There are pumping stations for Sea Dike and Lords Drain, and the outfalls of the Risegate Eau and Five Towns drainage channels before the final bridge at Fosdyke is reached.

=== Fosdyke Wash ===
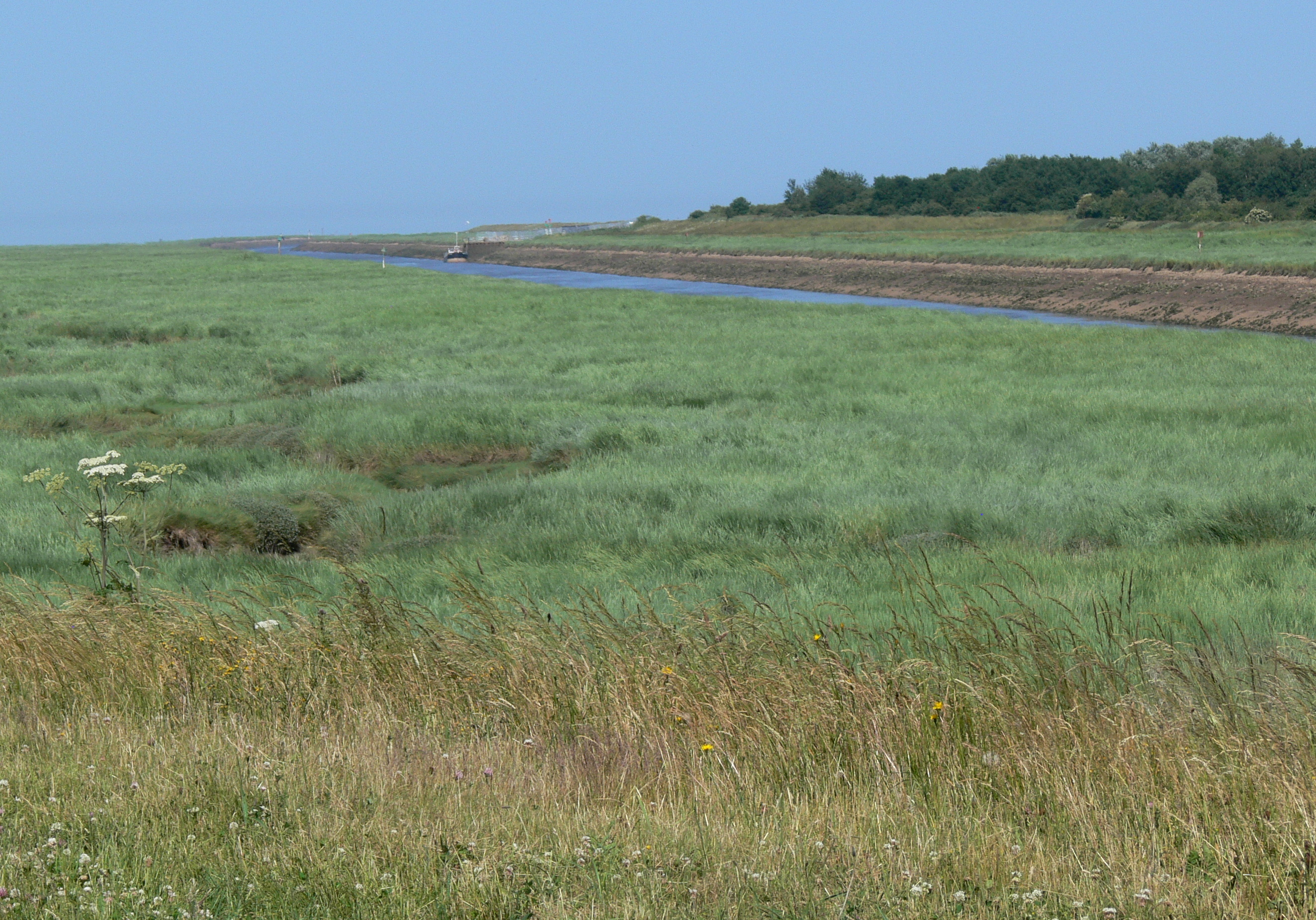
The River Welland at the start of the Fosdyke Wash area of salt marshes where the river becomes a tidal outflow before entering The Wash

After passing Fosdyke Bridge the river passes into Moulton Marsh where it is joined by the Holbeach River, the river from this point then enters a area of extensive salt marshes with estuary like features which make up what is known as 'The Fosdyke Wash' at the very south-western edge of The Wash where the salt marshes becomes indistinguishable from the sea and from here the river quickly loses the traditional characteristics of being a river as the main river banks move away from the river itself at this point to become the main sea embankments and this leaves the river without a distinguishable mouth as it merely becomes a deep tidal channel known as the “Welland Outfall”, where it finally flows into The Wash itself in a area known as the 'Boston Deeps' at Tabs Head, where it also meets the mouth of The Haven close to the RSPB nature reserve at Frampton Marsh.

=== Points on course ===
Point	Coordinates (Links to map resources)	OS Grid Ref	Notes
Source at Sibbertoft	52.4399°N 1.0098°W	SP674828	
Jn with River Jordan	52.4716°N 0.9165°W	SP737865	Market Harborough
Jn with Medbourne Brook	52.5164°N 0.8164°W	SP804916	
Jn with Eye Brook	52.5299°N 0.7090°W	SP876932	
Welland Viaduct	52.5689°N 0.6536°W	SP913976	
Jn with River Chater	52.6407°N 0.5218°W	TF001057	
Roman Ford, Stamford	52.6457°N 0.4865°W	TF025064	
Site of Stamford Wharf	52.6503°N 0.4772°W	TF031069	
Start of Stamford Canal	52.6539°N 0.4640°W	TF040073	
Jn with River Gwash	52.6539°N 0.4509°W	TF048073	
Start of Maxey Cut	52.6558°N 0.3804°W	TF096076	
Jn with Greatford Cut	52.6751°N 0.3350°W	TF126098	
End of Stamford Canal	52.6749°N 0.3180°W	TF138099	
End of Maxey Cut	52.6515°N 0.2617°W	TF176073	
B1166 bridge, Crowland	52.6795°N 0.1830°W	TF229106	
End of New River, Little London	52.7723°N 0.1604°W	TF242210	End of Welland Washes
Start of Coronation Channel	52.7786°N 0.1554°W	TF245217	Spalding
Spalding Lock	52.7997°N 0.1350°W	TF258240	
Jn with River Glen	52.8472°N 0.0970°W	TF282294	Surfleet
Fosdyke Bridge	52.8713°N 0.0423°W	TF318322	Drains called 'Five towns drain'
Mouth at The Wash	52.8983°N 0.0308°E	TF366353	

== History ==
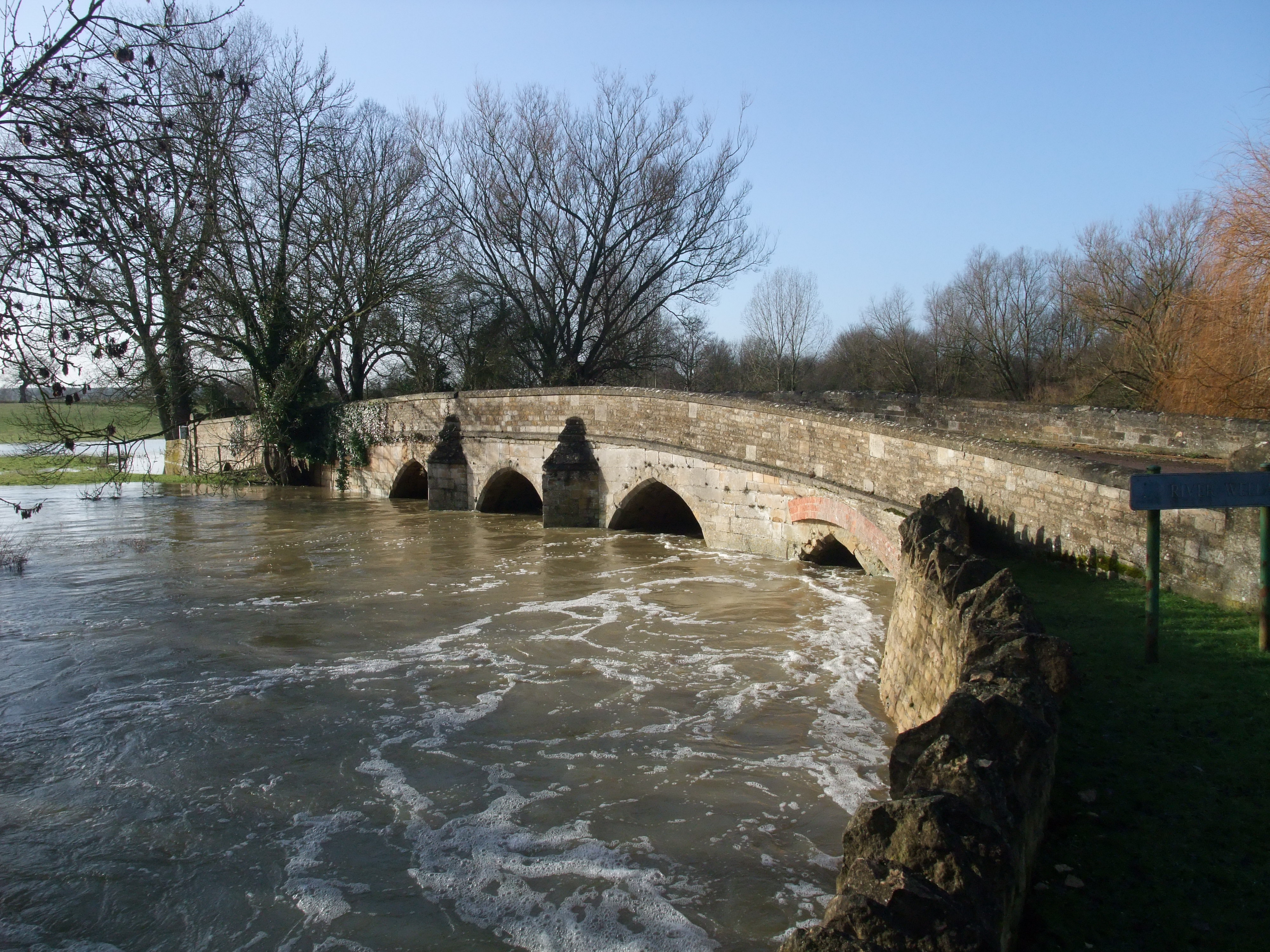
The Welland in spate at Duddington, showing its capacity for flooding adjoining meadows

The origin of the name for the river is unknown but appears to be Pre-English. In Old English the form was Weolud and may have changed to the Middle English form due to folk-etymology or Scandinavian influence. The Welland (Weolud) is first mentioned in the Anglo-Saxon Chronicle for 921 AD.

Richard de Rulos, who was Lord of Deeping Fen during the reign of William the Conqueror erected a strong embankment to prevent flooding of the meadows adjoining the river, which then became fertile fields and a pleasure garden. During the reign of Henry III (1207–1272), complaints were made that of the two channels below Crowland, the one to Spalding was more favourable to the passage of barges, but the Abbot of Crowland had obstructed and narrowed its course by planting willow trees. In the fourteenth century, Spalding was charged with failing to scour and repair the river, causing damage to the king's liege people, but argued that because it was tidal at this point, it was an arm of the sea, and so they were not responsible.

Welland Navigation Act 1571
- Act of Parliament
- Parliament of England
- Long title: An Act to make the River of Weylande navigable.
- Citation: 13 Eliz. 1. c. 1 Pr.

Dates
- Royal assent: 29 May 1571
- Commencement: 2 April 1571 (Note: Start of session.)

Status: Current legislation

The river was one of the earlier rivers to be granted an act of Parliament for improvements, to allow navigation to Stamford. The Welland Navigation Act 1571 (13 Eliz. 1. c. 1 Pr.) was granted in the reign of Elizabeth I in 1571, and detailed how Stamford had prospered as a result of the river, but also stated that mills built between Stamford and Deeping had resulted in it no longer being navigable, for they had diverted the water. Powers were granted to restore the river using either the old channel or the new one, although it is not clear exactly what was meant by this. There is no evidence that any work was carried out under the terms of the act.

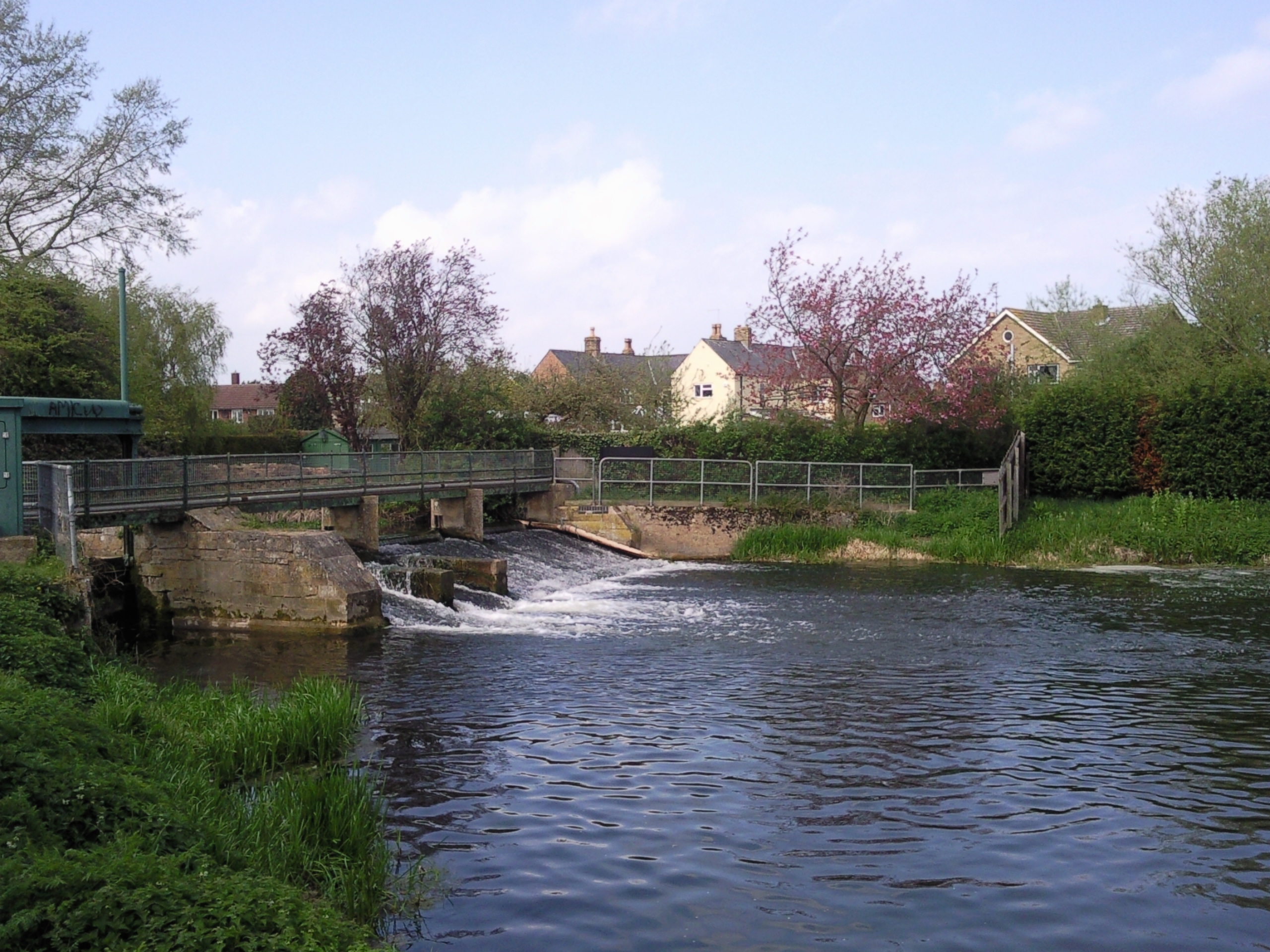
The remains of the low locks at Deeping St James

The powers were revived in 1620, when Stamford Corporation was given permission by the Commission of Sewers to build a new 9.5-mile (15.3 km) artificial cut, which would run from the eastern edge of Stamford near Hudd's Mill, to Market Deeping, where it would rejoin the river. The decision was ratified in 1623 by a grant of James I, and the corporation expected to have the work completed by 1627. However, they were unable to find a suitable contractor to carry out the work, and failed to reach agreement on terms with David Cecil in 1636, and two other potential contractors after that. Finally in 1664, an alderman from Stamford called Daniel Wigmore took the job. He built the cut and 12 locks, which included the High Lock and the Low Lock on the river at Deeping St James, at a cost of £5,000. In return for his expenditure, he was given the lease of the tolls for the next 80 years, for which he paid a rent of one shilling (five pence). The cut, known as the Stamford Canal, is one of the earliest post-Roman canals in England. It opened in 1670, around 100 years before the start of the Industrial Revolution which brought about the "golden age for canals" in Britain. When built, it was the longest canal with locks in Britain, and was very busy with barges carrying flour, malt, coal, timber and limestone.

The people of Market Deeping, Deeping Gate and Deeping St James, together with other villages along the river presented a petition to Elizabeth I, requesting that the fens should be drained, as the banks of the river and of the neighbouring Glen were in a poor state of repair. They suggested that Thomas Lovell should undertake the work, which he did, at a cost of £12,000, for which he received 15,000 acres (6,100 ha) of the land which was reclaimed as a result of the work. Unrest in the early 1600s resulted in most of the works being destroyed, but in 1632 a group of adventurers led by the Earl of Bedford were granted permission to drain Deeping Fen, South Fen and Crowland. The work included making the Welland deeper and wider from Deeping St James to its outfall beyond Spalding, and the construction of side drains. These included a drain running from Pode Hole to below Spalding, which is still known as Vernatt's Drain, after one of the adventurers called Sir Philibert Vernatti. Although declared completed in 1637, efficient drainage would have to wait until the construction of Pode Hole pumping station in 1827.

At Crowland the river used to split into two channels, one broadly following the present course of the river, and the other joining the old South Ea to reach the River Nene near Wisbech. Dugdale, writing in 1662, described the Spalding channel as "a most slow course". The river no longer flows through Crowland, but the unique triangular Trinity Bridge, which spanned the junction, remains in the centre of the town.

Spalding had been a port from a time before any of the river improvements were made. The townspeople had refused to repair the river during the reign of Henry III, for they claimed that here it was part of the sea. Its importance as a port increased with the river improvements and the Stamford Canal, and although it did not have a customs house, by 1695 it had various officials who acted as customs officers for goods arriving at the quays and warehouses. Exports included oats, coleseed, rape oil, hides and wool, with a much greater variety of imports, including stone, timber, coal, groceries, glass and beeswax. More exotic imports included French and Spanish wines, and some of the first imports of tea, coffee and chocolate.

=== Deeping Fen ===
The drainage of Deeping Fen was again addressed when the Draining Deeping Fen Act 1664 (16 & 17 Cha. 2. c. 11) awarded the Earl of Manchester and others 10,000 acres (4,000 ha) of land in return for the drainage works. They were also obliged to maintain the banks of the river, to ensure that both the Welland and the Glen were kept clean and free-flowing, and to ensure that no tolls were charged for navigation on any part of the river below East Deeping. The inadequacy of the outfall and a spate of bad weather stopped them from completing their task. They tried renting out the land they had been granted, but many tenants were unable to pay the rent, due to the poor state of the drainage which reduced crop yields. In April 1729, the Deeping Fen Adventurers received a letter from Captain John Perry, expressing the opinion that the only way to improve the drainage was to improve the river outfalls, and proposing the construction of scouring sluices on the river at Spalding, on Vernatt's drain at its outfall, and on the River Glen at Surfleet. Perry was an engineer of some repute, who had set the standard for engineering reports in 1727, when he published his recommendations for the North Level of the Fens. His plans were approved, and the Adventurers offered to give him land covering nearly 6,000 acres (2,400 ha) in payment for the work. He sold one-third of the land to finance the project, and began work in 1730. Cowbit sluice on the Welland had six 6-foot (1.8 m) wide gates which were operated by chains connected to a treadwheel. At high tide, water was penned in Cowbit Wash, between banks which were set well back from the main channel. The bed of the river below the sluice was loosened by dragging wooden rollers with iron spikes over it. At low tide, the sluice gates were opened, and the flow scoured out the silt for some 3 miles (4.8 km) downstream. A navigation lock was constructed beside the sluice, so that vessels could still gain access to the river above. Perry died in February 1733, and was buried in Spalding churchyard. The lock lasted until it was removed by the Welland commissioners in 1813.

Perry was succeeded by John Grundy, Sr., who published a paper in 1734 on flow in open drains. He calculated theoretic flow rates, and then used observation in the field to modify the results. He oversaw a programme of repairs to the Deeping Bank, which ran for 12 miles (19 km) along the north and west side of the river, while John Scribo was employed to do the same for the Country Bank, which ran for 6 miles (9.7 km) on the south and east. Grundy made the river deeper above Spalding, and also constructed a sluice and reservoir at the mouth of the Glen. The reservoir covered 8 acres (3.2 ha) and provided water to scour the channel below the sluice. His son, John Grundy, Jr., took over after the death of his father in 1748, and spent nearly £10,000 on bank repairs between then and 1764. He rebuilt Perry's sluice soon after 1750, with taller doors and a set of tide gates to prevent the tide moving upstream, and rebuilt the navigation lock in 1754. After 1764, Thomas Hogard became the surveyor of works, but Grundy continued to act as a consultant engineer.

Hogard devised a scheme to cut a new channel from the junction of the Welland and the Glen to Wyberton, on the estuary of the River Witham below Boston. At the end of the 7.5-mile (12.1 km) cut, there would be a huge sluice and a navigation lock. The Adventurers asked Thomas Tofield for a second opinion, who suggested a shorter 5-mile (8 km) cut from Spalding to Fosdyke. They requested help from Grundy, who proposed a 1.5-mile (2.4 km) cut to Fosdyke, and that the outfall of Vernatt's drain should be moved 2.5 miles (4.0 km) downstream. Improvements to the drain were carried out under an act of Parliament, the Fen Drainage Act 1774 (14 Geo. 3. c. 16) obtained in 1774, and another act of Parliament, the Lincoln Drainage, etc. Act 1794 (34 Geo. 3. c. 102), was obtained in 1794 to sanction the Wyberton cut, although the work was not carried out, and Grundy's cut was built under a new act of Parliament of 1801.

Several prominent civil engineer considered the problems of Deeping Fen and the river outfall at the end of the 1700s. Two reports were produced, one by George Maxwell, and the second by Edward Hare, who had been assisted by William Jessop and John Rennie. They formed the basis for the Deeping Fen Act 1801. The channel above Spalding was made deeper, the north bank was made stronger, and the North and South Drove Drains were enlarged through the fen. One of Rennie's recommendations had been to replace the windmills which drove the drainage pumps with a steam pumping station at Pode Hole, but this was not implemented. After reports by Rennie and Thomas Pear in 1815, and by Rennie alone in 1818 and 1820, the provision of steam engines was authorised by an act of Parliament in 1823. The trustees appointed by the 1801 act continued to manage Deeping Fen until they were replaced in 1939 by the Deeping Fen, Spalding and Pinchbeck Internal Drainage Board, subsequently renamed the Welland & Deepings Internal Drainage Board.

=== The Outfall ===
Plans to re-route the outfall along a new channel which would meet the River Witham at The Scalp, near Boston, were authorised in 1794, but the money could not be raised at the time, due to the financial crisis caused by the French Wars. Grundy's shorter channel had been finished by 1810, improving both drainage and navigation. James Walker reported in 1835 on further improvements, making the recommendation that the river below Spalding should be constrained between high banks, so that the scouring action of the water would dredge its own channel. Rather than excavating, which he estimated would cost £70,000, he suggested using fascines made of thorn branches, around which silt would be deposited. Such a scheme would only cost £13,000, and the work went on for many years. The effects of the embankments had resulted in the bed of the river below Fosdyke being around 7 feet (2.1 m) lower by 1845. In 1867, the River Welland Outfall Act enabled the trustees to raise money to repair the walls where the tide had washed away some of the fill behind the fascines. A dredger was employed between 1889 and 1890, which had been invented by a Mr Harrison, the superintendent of works.

With the passing of the Land Drainage Act 1930, the Welland Catchment Board was created. They had spent £91,537 on the outfall by 1937. Towards the end of the Second World War, E. G. Taverner, the chief engineer for the drainage board, devised a plan to relieve flooding in Spalding by creating a bypass channel, and building the Greatford Cut to divert the waters of the West Glen river into the Welland upstream of Market Deeping. The scheme cost £723,000, with much of the work being carried out by W. & C. French, and the Coronation Channel around Spalding was opened in September 1953. Fulney lock was constructed at the same time to exclude the tide from the upper river, as was the Maxey Cut, an embanked channel that bypasses the villages of Market Deeping, Deeping Gate and Deeping St James. During the 1960s and 1970s, several sections of the river above Stamford were made straighter and deeper, to reduce the risk of flooding of agricultural land. To address the habitat and environmental issues causes by such engineering work, the Welland Rivers Trust, a limited company and charitable trust, was set up in 2010. They are seeking to direct regeneration of the river by co-ordinating various organisations, which are known collectively as the Welland Valley Partnership. They published a major document outlining their proposals in February 2013, and by 2020 had completed 36 enhancement projects.

== Navigation ==
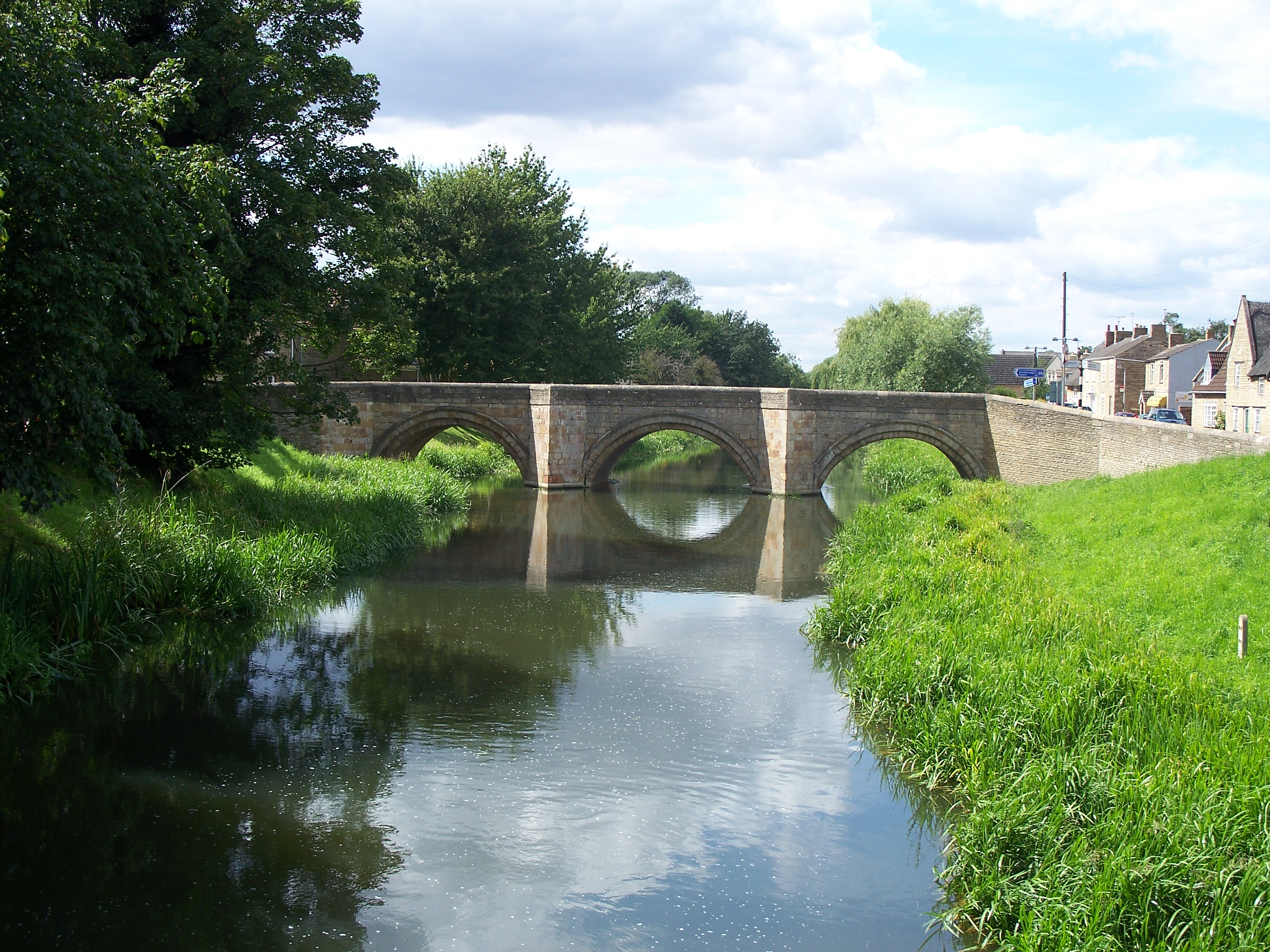
The bridge connecting Deeping St James and Deeping Gate crosses the old course of the River Welland.

The river as far as Stamford was used by the Romans for navigation, as it formed part of a system including the Car Dyke, which ran along the western edge of the Fens and crossed the river near the modern Folly River. Navigation to Stamford was improved by the canal. Boats used on the canal were small lighters, around 7 feet (2.1 m) wide, capable of carrying from seven to fourteen tons, and normally worked in trains of four vessels. With the arrival of the railways, river trade declined. The Midland Railway reached Peterborough in 1846, and opened their line to Melton Mowbray, passing through Stamford, in 1848. Carriage of coal on the upper river stopped, and the locks deteriorated. By April 1863, all traffic had ceased, and Stamford Corporation tried to sell the line at auction, but failed because their ownership of it was disputed.

Trade on the lower river was carried in barges and keels. During the early 1800s as trade was increasing, so the river was simultaneously silting up. Around 1800, vessels carrying 60 tons could reach the port facilities at Spalding; however, by the 1820s, ships could only be loaded with 40 tons each as the river silting had worsened. Trade records indicate that in 1829, vessels carried just under 20,000 tons to and from Spalding, and by 1835 this had increased to over 34,000 tons. There was pressure from merchants to cater for larger vessels, and with later improvements, carried out under an Act of Parliament obtained in 1837, barges and sloops of up to 120 tons could use the port. Because the river was maintained for drainage, some commercial traffic continued despite the railways, and tolls of £478 were collected on 11,690 tons in 1888. Coal for Spalding gasworks arrived by boat until the early 1900s, and the last regular trade was the carriage of corn, hay and straw from Spalding to Fosdyke, where the cargo was transferred to larger ships. All commercial carrying had ceased by the end of the Second World War.

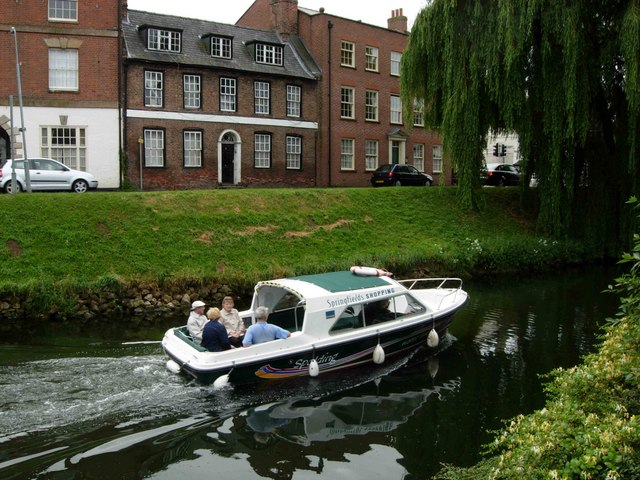
Spalding water taxi

A water taxi service was launched in Spalding in July 2005. Its route is from just off Spalding's High Street upstream along the river, turning onto the Coronation Channel, and going to Springfields Outlet Shopping & Festival Gardens, and back.

Vessels of 110 by 30 feet (33.5 by 9.1 m) and drawing 8 feet (2.4 m) can still proceed along the estuary at high water, and can travel inland as far as Fulney lock. They cannot pass through the lock as it is only 62.3 by 27.8 feet (19.0 by 8.5 m) and at normal summer water levels, can accommodate boats drawing 2.6 feet (0.79 m). The river is officially navigable to the point at which the Folly River joins it, but the length of boats allowed on this section is restricted to 35 feet (11 m) long, considerably less than the lock dimensions would suggest. Navigation on this stretch was severely restricted by Four Mile Bar footbridge, which provided just 5.25 feet (1.60 m) of headroom, but this was increased when a new single-span arched bridge was installed in early 2007 by the Lincolnshire Waterways Partnership. Smaller boats such as canoes, which can be carried around obstructions, can continue up to Stamford, but they must use the old course of the river through the Deepings, rather than the Maxey cut.

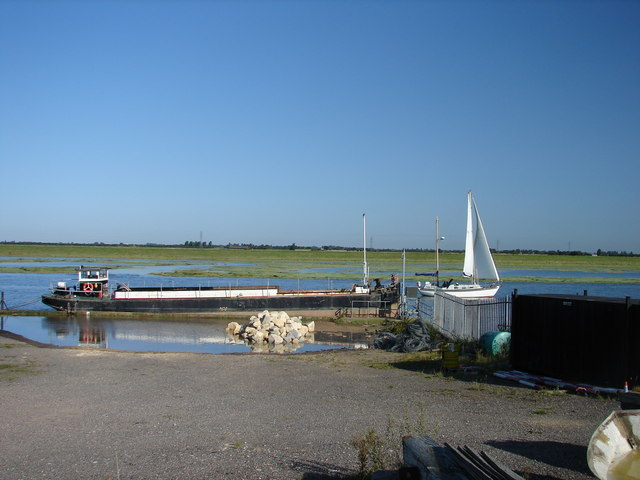
Barge and passing yacht between Fosdyke and the Wash

Below Spalding, there were no restrictions on headroom, which allowed small coasters to reach the town. The bridge at Fosdyke was a swing bridge, to comply with the provisions of the Fosdyke Bridge Act of 1870. The demise of such traffic allowed it to be replaced by a fixed bridge with headroom of 16.5 feet (5.0 m), but the powers of the original Act had to be rescinded, and the Port of Fosdyke Act was obtained in 1987 to allow this to happen. The redundant wharfs at Fosdyke have been developed to provide moorings for yachts and other pleasure craft. The lock at Fulney has three sets of gates, two pointing towards the sea, and a third between them which points upriver. Thus, the lock can only be used when the level below it is higher than the level above it, and as the tide falls, the intermediate gate closes to prevent its use.

The principle of there being no tolls for use of the river was established by the 1664 Act of Parliament. This was reversed by the 1794 Act, which imposed high tolls, until they were reduced by the provisions of an Act of Parliament obtained in 1824. The river is now managed by the Environment Agency between Stamford and just below Fosdyke bridge, and a licence is required to use it. From there to the Wash, it was managed by the Port of Fosdyke Authority, but since they went into administration, the Environment Agency have also managed the section from Fosdyke Bridge to below the Holbeach River.

== Wildlife ==
In its upper reaches the river supports a wild brown trout population and the occasional grayling. Chub and perch dominate the middle reaches around Stamford, with pike, perch, zander, roach, bream, rudd, ruffe, gudgeon and eels inhabiting the lower lengths around Spalding.

A collaboration between the Welland Rivers Trust, the Wild Trout Trust and the Environment Agency has resulted in the construction of a rock ramp, to allow migrating sea trout to pass up the river beyond the weir on the Maxey Cut, which was acting as a barrier. Some 300 tons of rock, with 50 tons of finer material forming a top layer, were used to create the ramp. The finer material ensures that water mainly flows over the ramp, rather than through it. The ramp also enables young eels or elvers to move up the river, and provides habitat for stone loach and bullheads.

Large numbers of swans and geese use the river around Crowland, and out to sea. Smaller populations of each can be seen around the Stamford Meadows, and further upstream.

In 2015, a grey seal found its way from the Wash up the river and spent a few weeks sleeping in gardens next to the river in Deeping St James. The seal was spotted further downstream in Spalding as it eventually made its way back to the sea.

On the south bank of the river below Fosdyke bridge, the Lincolnshire Wildlife Trust have established Moulton Marsh nature reserve, on a strip of land where soil was excavated to raise the banks in 1981. Habitat is provided by some broad-leafed woodland, covering 15 acres (6.1 ha), several salt-water lagoons and tidal scrapes, covering 35 acres (14 ha), and 40 acres (16 ha) of saltmarsh. A variety of birds can be seen, including little grebe and water rail, which spend the winter on the lagoons, while the scrapes, which consist of shallow pools and muddy shorelines, are visited by common redshank and little egret.

Between the river mouth and the River Witham, a large expanse of saltmarsh provides breeding grounds for common redshank, Eurasian oystercatcher and reed bunting in the summer, and Eurasian wigeon, mallard, common shelduck and common teal in the winter. Birds of prey such as hen harrier and merlin feed on the flocks of linnet and twite, while the mudflats support dunlin, Eurasian whimbrel, and bar-tailed godwit. The Lincolnshire Wildlife Trust have a reserve there, which is next to RSPB Frampton Marsh, a reserve managed by the Royal Society for the Protection of Birds.

== Water quality ==
The Environment Agency measure the water quality of the river systems in England. Each is given an overall ecological status, which may be one of five levels: high, good, moderate, poor and bad. There are several components that are used to determine this, including biological status, which looks at the quantity and varieties of invertebrates, angiosperms and fish. Chemical status, which compares the concentrations of various chemicals against known safe concentrations, is rated good or fail.

The water quality of the River Welland was as follows in 2019.

Section	Ecological Status	Chemical Status	Length	Catchment	Channel
Welland - headwaters to conf Jordan	Poor	Fail	9.7 miles (15.6 km)	20.62 square miles (53.4 km^{2})	
Welland - conf Jordan to conf Langton Bk	Poor	Fail	3.8 miles (6.1 km)	6.36 square miles (16.5 km^{2})	
Welland - conf Langton Bk to conf Gwash	Moderate	Fail	33.1 miles (53.3 km)	48.69 square miles (126.1 km^{2})	
Welland - conf Gwash to conf Greatford Cut	Moderate	Fail	11.1 miles (17.9 km)	7.31 square miles (18.9 km^{2})	
Welland - conf Greatford Cut to tidal	Moderate	Fail	20.7 miles (33.3 km)	27.49 square miles (71.2 km^{2})	

Like most rivers in the UK, the chemical status changed from good to fail in 2019, due to the presence of polybrominated diphenyl ethers (PBDE) and mercury compounds, neither of which had previously been included in the assessment.

== See also ==
- List of rivers of England
- Rolls-Royce Welland, Britain's first production jet engine
- Welland River in Ontario

== Bibliography ==
- Boyes, John; Russell, Ronald (1977). The Canals of Eastern England. David and Charles. ISBN 978-0-7153-7415-3.
- Cox, Barrie (1994). The place-names of Rutland. English Place-Name Society. ISBN 978-0-904889-17-8.
- Cumberlidge, Jane (2009). Inland Waterways of Great Britain (8th ed.). Imray Laurie Norie and Wilson. ISBN 978-1-84623-010-3.
- Edwards, L. A. (1985). Inland Waterways of Great Britain (6th ed.). Imray Laurie Norie and Wilson. ISBN 978-0-85288-081-4.
- Edwards, Samuel, ed. (1810). Extracts taken from Harod's history of Stamford: relating to the navigation of the River Welland from Stamford to the Sea. Stamford, UK.
- Ekwall, Eilert (1928). English river-names. Clarendon Press.
- French, Chris (24 June 2020). "Welland Catchment 5 Year Plan" (PDF). Welland Valley Partnership. Archived (PDF) from the original on 23 December 2021.
- Labrum, E. A. (1994). Civil Engineering Heritage: Eastern and central England. Thomas Telford. ISBN 978-0-7277-1970-6.
- Powell, Mary (March 2007). "Bridge over the Welland" (PDF). Newsletter 12. Lincolnshire Waterways Partnership. Archived (PDF) from the original on 31 August 2021.
- Saunders, Mary (1836). Lincolnshire in 1836. John Saunders.
- Skempton, Sir Alec; et al. (2002). A Biographical Dictionary of Civil Engineers in Great Britain and Ireland: Vol 1: 1500 to 1830. Thomas Telford. ISBN 978-0-7277-2939-2.
- Wheeler, William Henry; Batty, Leonard Charles (1896). A History of the Fens of South Lincolnshire. British Library Historical Print Collections. ISBN 978-1-241-32839-9.
- The Rivers Welland and Glen Users Guide (PDF). Environment Agency. 2008. Archived from the original (PDF) on 26 July 2011.
