= River Jordan, Northamptonshire =

River in Northamptonshire and Leicestershire, England

Jordan
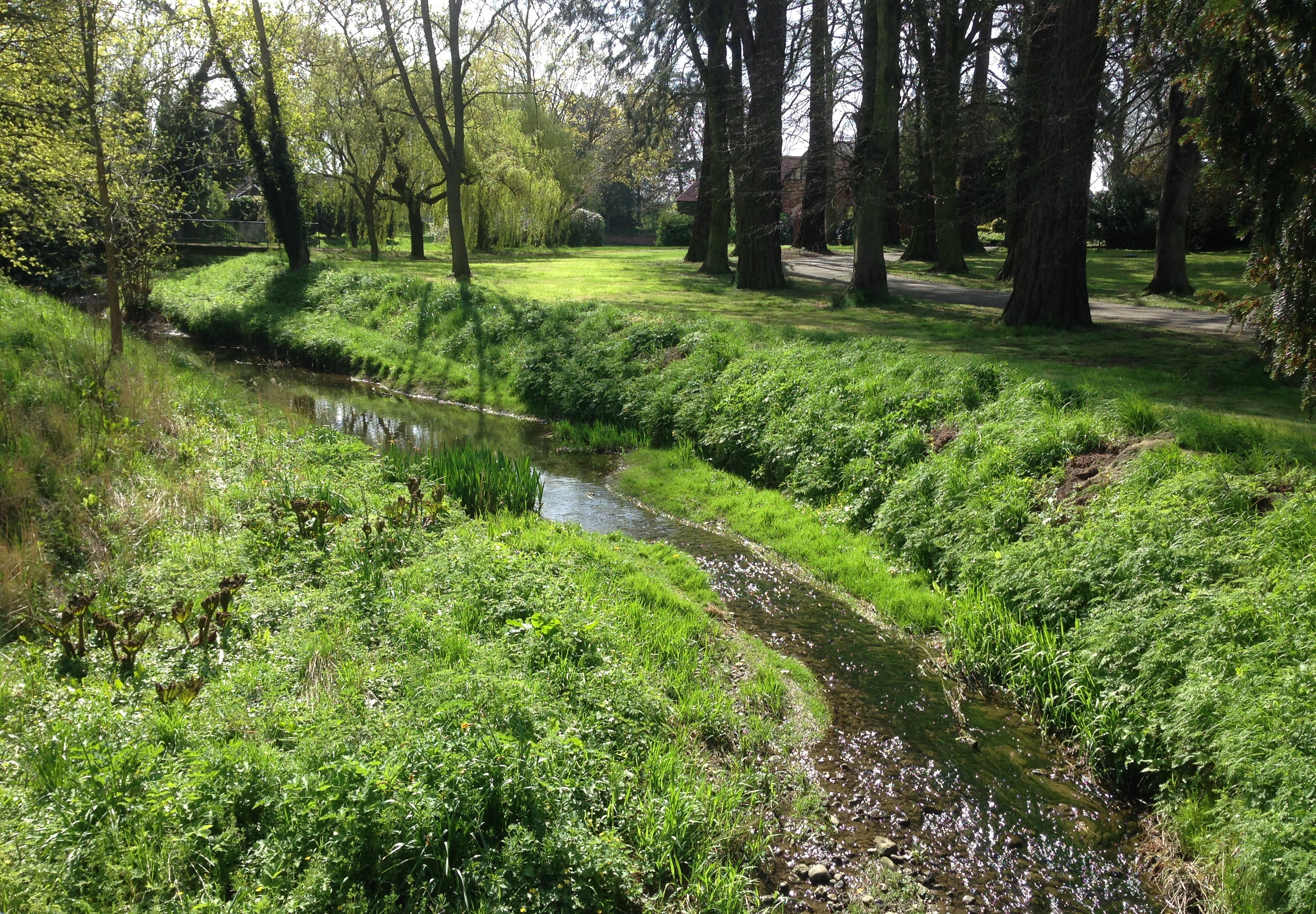
- The River Jordan in Little Bowden

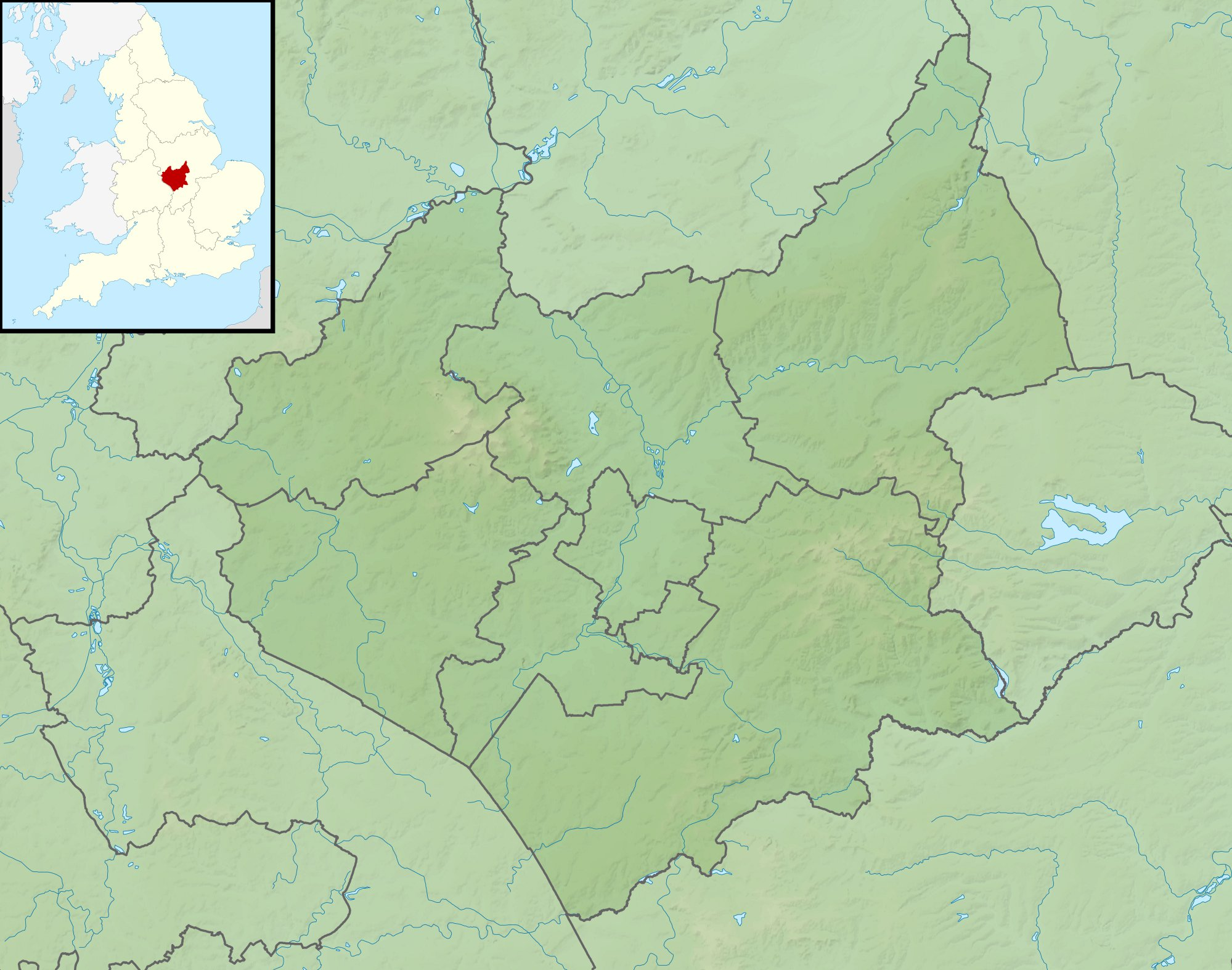
- Location of the river mouth in Leicestershire

Location
- Country: England
- Counties: Northamptonshire, Leicestershire

Physical characteristics
- Source
  - location: Desborough, Northamptonshire
  - coordinates: 52.455898°N 0.838524°W
  - elevation: 140 m (460 ft)
- Mouth: River Welland
  - location: Market Harborough, Leicestershire
  - coordinates: 52.478592°N 0.909807°W
  - elevation: 81 m (266 ft)
- Basin size: 21.4 km^{2} (8.3 sq mi)

Basin features
- River system: River Welland

The River Jordan is a short river in the East Midlands of England. It is a tributary of the River Welland.

== Course ==
It rises to the north-west of Desborough in Northamptonshire before flowing through Braybrooke and into Leicestershire at Little Bowden within Market Harborough before joining the River Welland at Rockingham Road, Market Harborough, close to the railway station and bridge.

== Status ==
In 2019, the overall classification of the River Jordan was 'Bad' under the Water Framework Directive for reasons of poor livestock, soil and nutrient management in the agricultural land surrounding it, enrichment from treated sewage effluent and physical modification for land drainage.
