= Fosdyke =

Village and civil parish in the Borough of Boston, Lincolnshire, England

Coordinates: 52.879495°N 0.04529°W

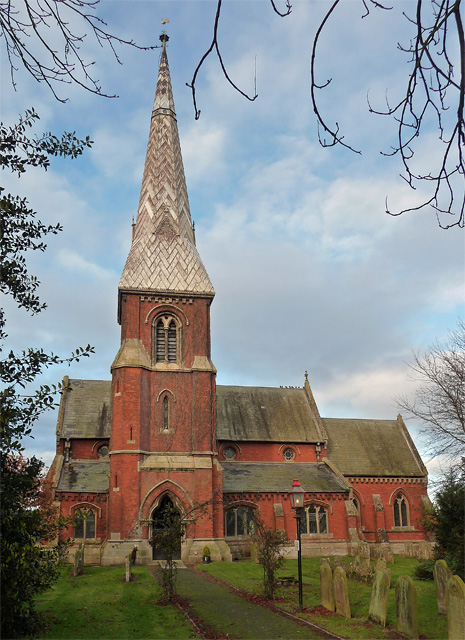
- All Saints, Fosdyke

- Location within Lincolnshire
- Population: 480 (2011)
- OS grid reference: TF316331
  - London: 90 mi (140 km) S
- Civil parish: Fosdyke
- District: Boston
- Shire county: Lincolnshire
- Region: East Midlands
- Country: England
- Sovereign state: United Kingdom
- Post town: Boston
- Postcode district: PE20
- Dialling code: 01205
- Police: Lincolnshire
- Fire: Lincolnshire
- Ambulance: East Midlands
- UK Parliament: Boston and Skegness

Fosdyke is a village and civil parish in the Borough of Boston, Lincolnshire, England. The population of the civil parish at the 2021 census was 510. It is situated approximately 7 miles (11 km) south from Boston, just off the A17, and 2 miles (3.2 km) east from the junction of the A17 with the A16.

== History ==
The name derives from the Old English and Old Norse "fotrs dic", meaning Fotr's (personal name) ditch.

Fosdyke's Grade II listed Anglican church is dedicated to All Saints. In 1871–72 the church was entirely rebuilt in brick on the site of an older church, in an Early English style. The architect was Edward Browning. The church was built at the expense of Rev. Basil Beridge, rector and lord of the manor at Algarkirk.

In 1885 Kelly's Directory reported the existence of a Primitive Methodist chapel, a coastguard station, and a row of 400-year-old almshouses, founded by Sir Thomas Middlecott for the Fosdyke and Algarkirk parishes. In 1625 Middlecott founded these almshouses for ten poor folk of good name and repute of Fosdyke and Algarkirk. The building was sold in the late 1970s, the money being used to build modern bungalows in Fosdyke and Algarkirk. The almshouses are now privately owned homes.

== Geography ==
The village is near the mouth of the River Welland, and the parish extends across the river to include both ends of the hamlet of Fosdyke Bridge.

Fosdyke Wash, the marshy area at the mouth of the Welland, is shown by Ordnance Survey as the nearest coastal location to Coton in the Elms in Derbyshire, which is the furthest point from the sea in Great Britain, 70 miles (113 km) away.

Fosdyke is one of eighteen civil parishes which, together with Boston, form the Borough of Boston local government district, in place since a reorganisation of 1 April 1974 which resulted from the Local Government Act 1972. Fosdyke parish forms part of the Five Villages electoral ward, along with Algarkirk, Bicker, Sutterton and Wigtoft. Hitherto, the parish had formed part of Boston Rural District in the Parts of Holland. Holland was one of the three divisions (formally known as parts) of the traditional county of Lincolnshire. Since the Local Government Act 1888 Holland had been, in most respects, a county in itself.

== Community ==
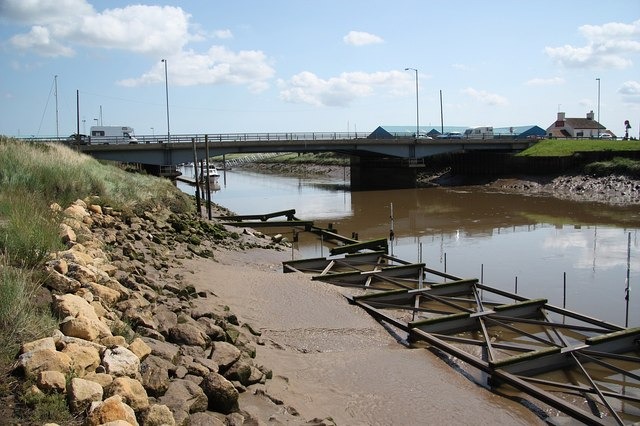
Fosdyke Bridge carrying the A17 over the Welland

Fosdyke has a village hall. The nearest post office is in Sutterton. The Ship Inn was refurbished, extended and reopened in 2024 and serves pub food and has seven bedrooms. Fosdyke has a Social Club called Fozzy's, a playing field with football pitch and changing rooms, has an enclosed multisport area, used for five-a-side football, basketball and volleyball. Adjacent to the social club building is a children's adventure playground. Situated at the end of the playing field is a bowls club. Businesses include builders, handymen, producers of fruit and vegetables, car body repair and a coach company. Next to Fosdyke Bridge is Fosdyke Yacht Haven, a pleasure boat marina and boatyard. The marina has dry land facilities for sailing craft.

=== Population ===
Population of Fosdyke Civil Parish
Year	1801	1811	1821	1831	1841	1851	1881	1891	1901	1911	1921	1931	1951	1961
Population	173	166	272	215	400	420	477	433	436	449	509	626	508	483
