= Newstead Priory =

Augustinian monastery in Lincolnshire, England

Coordinates: 52.65828°N 0.454248°W

Newstead Priory was a priory in Lincolnshire, England, between Stamford and Uffington.

It was founded as a hospital towards the end of the 12th century, and became a house of Augustinian Canons in or before 1226. Newstead Priory was situated on the River Gwash about halfway between Stamford and Uffington and near to the water mill.

== Burials ==
- William d'Aubigny (rebel)
