= River Gwash =

River in the East Midlands of England

Gwash
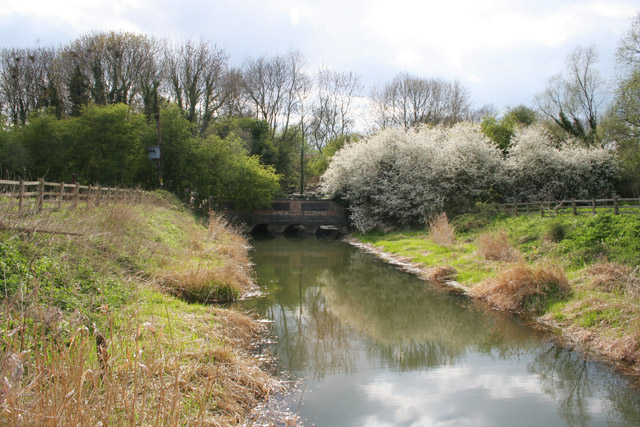
- The Gwash at Manton, before it enters Rutland Water

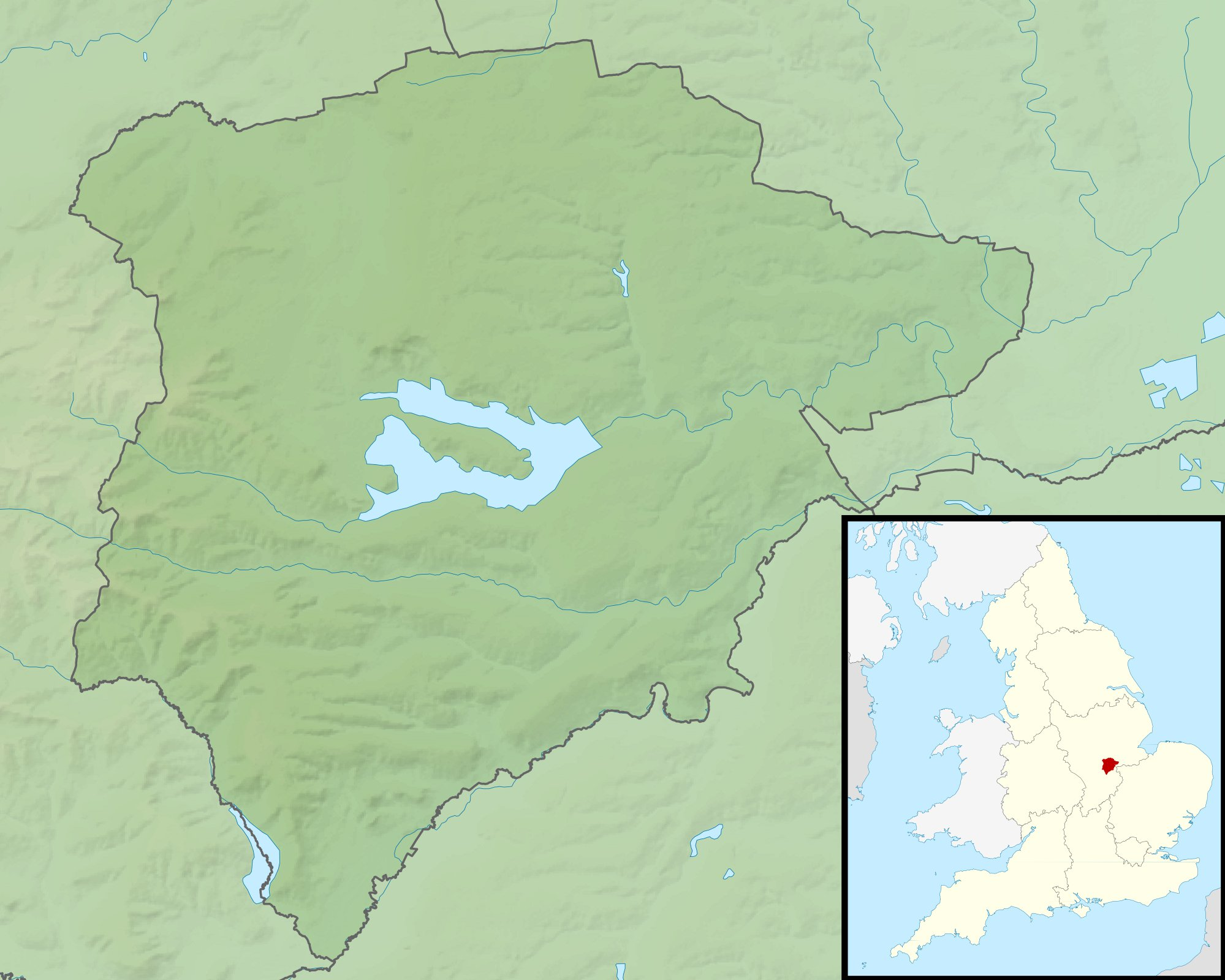
- Location of the river mouth close to Rutland

Location
- Country: England
- Counties: Lincolnshire, Rutland, Leicestershire

Physical characteristics
- Source
  - location: Knossington
  - coordinates: 52.672149°N 0.820308°W
  - elevation: 168 m (551 ft)
- Mouth: River Welland
  - location: Stamford
  - coordinates: 52.654065°N 0.450421°W
  - elevation: 19 m (62 ft)
- Length: 39 km (24 mi)

Basin features
- River system: River Welland
- Tributaries
  - left: North Brook

The River Gwash, occasionally Guash, a tributary of the River Welland, flows through the English counties of Leicestershire, Rutland and Lincolnshire. It rises just outside the village of Knossington in Leicestershire, near the western edge of Rutland. It is about 39 kilometres (24 mi) long.

== Course ==
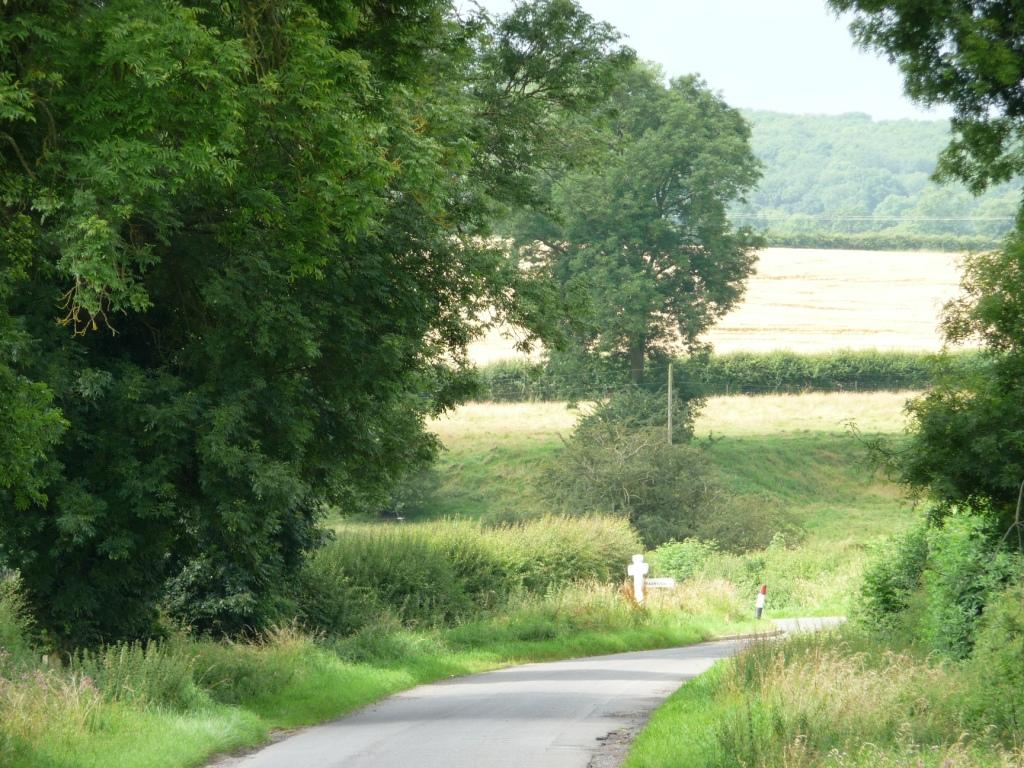
Valley of the Gwash at Brooke Priory

The source of the river is just north-west of the village of Knossington, but the Gwash is formed of several small headwaters that come together near Braunston-in-Rutland before passing the site of Brooke Priory at SK847062 and running westward to pass under the railway northwest of Manton (SK876052).

The Gwash then helps to fill the Rutland Water reservoir which was formed by damming its valley at Empingham. From the reservoir a controlled flow is released to maintain the flow around Tolethorpe Hall, Ryhall and Stamford and into the River Welland. The flow is enhanced by the Gwash's tributary, the North Brook, at SK956083 in Empingham, which significantly helps maintain riverlife.

East of Stamford, its course is now fixed, but it lies in a small flood plain which shows clear signs of the river's former meandering. The pasture fields include depressions that fill during wet seasons, forming oxbow lakes, though they are not of the classical shape. Near Stamford it is the parish boundary between Stamford and Uffington.

West of Stamford, the Gwash crossed the Stamford Canal, requiring some elaborate hydraulic works. Although the canal has been dry for over a century, the Borderville weir has only just been removed, and some meanders re-watered.

The river feeds the millpond at Newstead Mill in the parish of Uffington before entering the Welland at Newstead Bridge just east of Stamford. The confluence was restored in 2021 by the Welland Rivers Trust.

== Wildlife ==
The river supports a wild variety of fish species, including grayling and trout. Chub and dace inhabit the lower length below Newstead bridge in Stamford.

Attempts have been made to re-introduce water voles in the area. There are also concerns about non-native signal crayfish becoming dominant in the river, and reports of a deliberate introduction. The river has formed part of pilot trials of means to control that population.

== Etymology ==
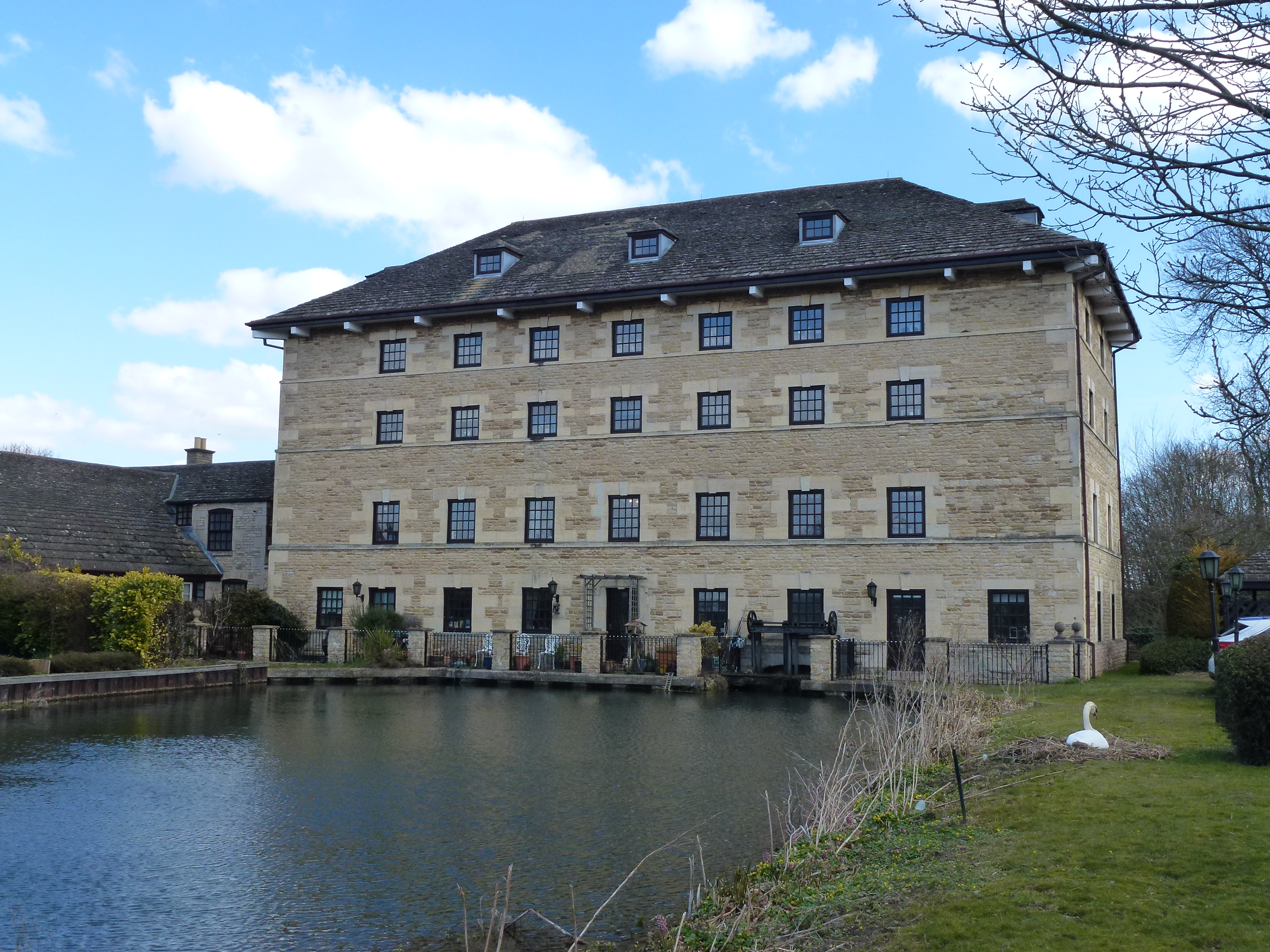
Newstead Mill, on the Gwash near the confluence with the Welland

The gw- opening is unknown in Old English but common in Brythonic languages such as modern Welsh. As such many words containing this element are borrowed into English, with the gw- becoming w-. The earliest recorded form of the name was "le Whasse" (c. 1230), with the modern spelling Gwash first recorded in 1586, with William Camden also using this spelling in his work Britannia, in the following century.

Most etymologists believe that the original name was Old English, with the word (ge)waesc (a washing, a flood) being suggested as a possible derivation.

== In literature ==
Local poet John Clare wrote a sonnet about the Gwash, published in Poems Descriptive of Rural Life and Scenery (London, 1820):

Where winding gash wirls round its wildest scene
On this romantic bend I sit me down
On that side view the meads their smoothing green
Edg'd with the peeping hamlets checkering brown
Here the steep hill as dripping headlong down
While glides the stream a silver streak between
As glides the shaded clouds along the sky
Brightning & deep'ning loosing as they're seen
In light & shade—so when old willows lean
Thus their broad shadow—runs the river bye
With tree & bush repleat a wilderd scene
& mossd & Ivyd sparkling on my eye—
O thus wild musing am I doubly blest
My woes unheeding—& my heart at rest.

== Sources ==
- Wheeler, William Henry; Batty, Leonard Charles (1896). A History of the Fens of South Lincolnshire. British Library Historical Print Collections. ISBN 978-1-241-32839-9.
