= Uffington, Lincolnshire =

Village and civil parish in Lincolnshire, England

Coordinates: 52.656138°N 0.430162°W

Uffington
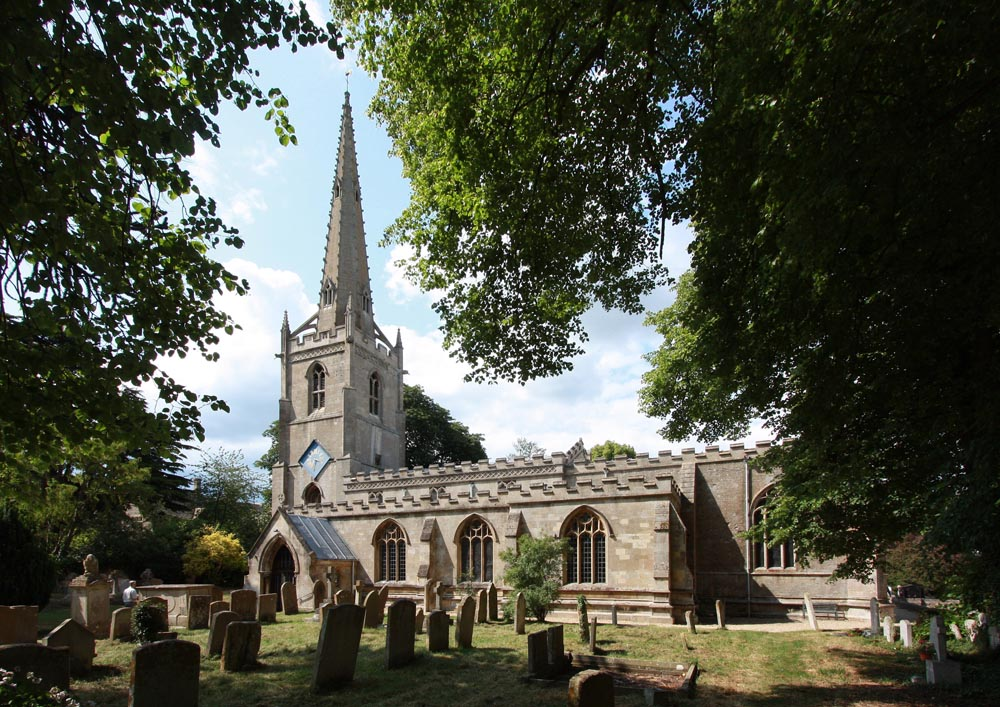
- St Michael and All Angels' Church, Uffington

- Location within Lincolnshire
- Population: 686 (2011)
- OS grid reference: TF062076
  - London: 85 mi (137 km) S
- District: South Kesteven
- Shire county: Lincolnshire
- Region: East Midlands
- Country: England
- Sovereign state: United Kingdom
- Post town: STAMFORD
- Postcode district: PE9
- Police: Lincolnshire
- Fire: Lincolnshire
- Ambulance: East Midlands
- UK Parliament: Grantham and Stamford

Uffington is a village and civil parish in the South Kesteven district of Lincolnshire, England. The population of the civil parish at the 2011 census was 686. It is in the valley of the River Welland, between Stamford and The Deepings.

== Geography ==
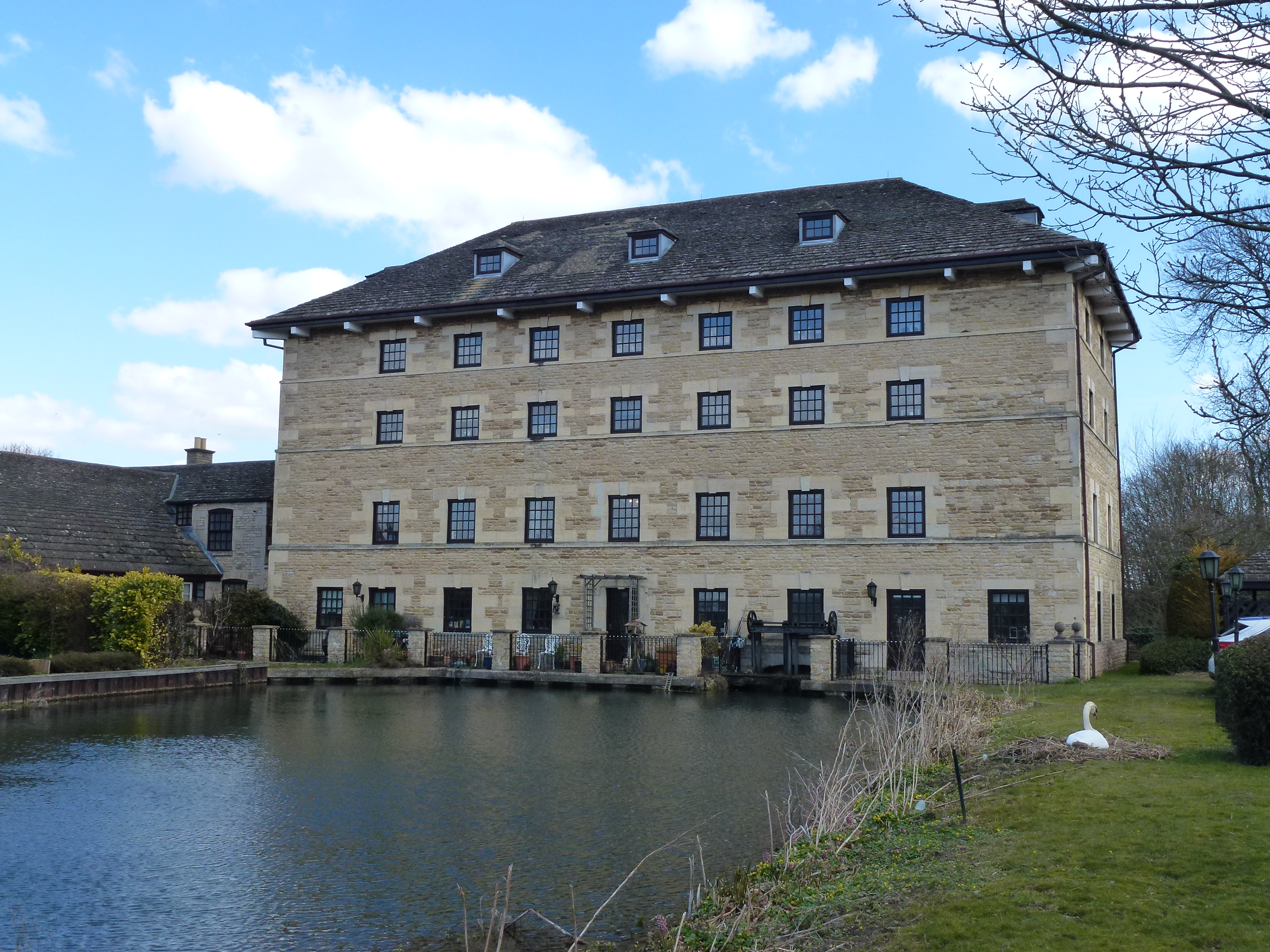
Newstead Mill

The village lies 1 mile (1.6 km) east of Stamford on the A1175 (previously the A16) where the low Jurassic clay and cornbrash ridge on which it stands lies 100 feet (30 m) or so above the level of The Fens.

Uffington Park, the grounds of a country house built in 1681 by the Bertie family and demolished by fire in 1904, lies between the village and the River Welland. Subsidiary buildings of Uffington House remain.

To the north-east is Casewick House, a Grade I listed country house, now divided into three units; several associated buildings are Grade II. It was a medieval house, remodelled in the 17th century and refronted 1786–88 by William Legge of Stamford in Gothick style.

Towards Stamford lay Newstead Priory. Newstead Mill is a Grade II listed watermill on the River Gwash; it is now converted to flats.

== Community ==
The Grade I listed parish church, St Michael and All Angels, dates back to the 12th century and was significantly restored in 1864 by Edward Browning. It is part of the Uffington Group of churches that also includes Tallington, Barholm, West Deeping, Wilsthorpe, Braceborough and Greatford. The thatched public house on Bertie Lane in the village is called the Bertie Arms. On the west side of the village is a nursery.

Until 1961 the village was served by Uffington and Barnack railway station. Today the village is served by Delaine Buses on the Stamford to Market Deeping route.

== Lost village of Casewick ==
Casewick Hall is the location of a deserted medieval village mentioned as "Casuic" in the Domesday survey, and as "Casewick" in a tax list of 1334. By 1816 only Casewick House and one other house had survived.

== Governance ==
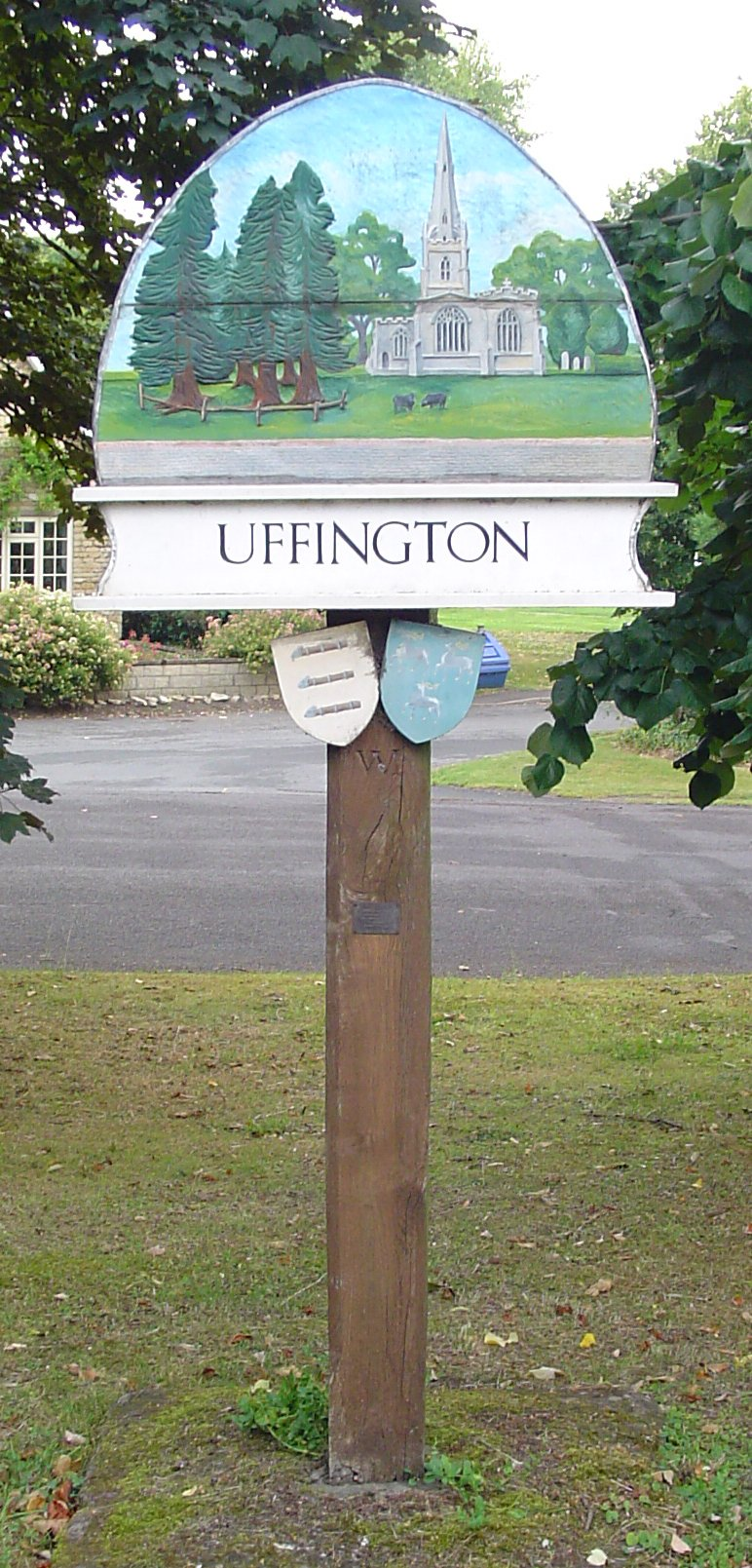
Village sign in Uffington

Uffington is served by a parish council, two district councillors who represent Casewick Ward on South Kesteven District Council and a county councillor representing Deepings West & Rural Division on Lincolnshire County Council. The district councillors elected in 2023 are Rosemary Trollope-Bellew (Con) and Vanessa Smith (Green). The county councillor elected in 2021 is Ashley Baxter (Ind).
