= Tallington railway station =

Former railway station in Lincolnshire, England

Coordinates: 52.6639°N 0.3823°W

Tallington
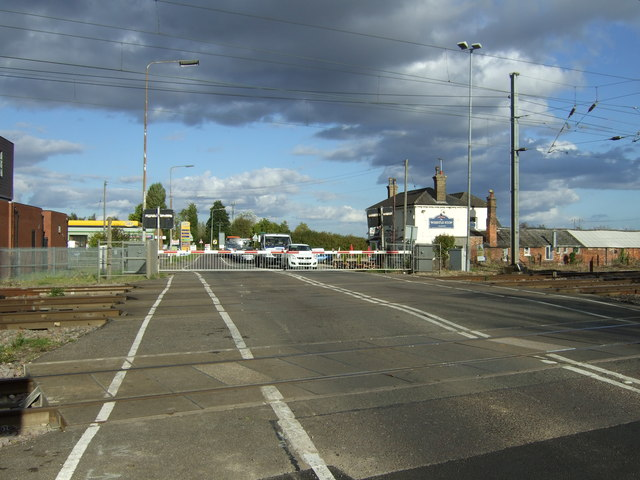
- Level crossing at Tallington

General information
- Location: Tallington, Lincolnshire; England
- Grid reference: TF095086
- Platforms: 2

Other information
- Status: Disused

History
- Pre-grouping: Great Northern Railway
- Post-grouping: London and North Eastern Railway

Key dates
- 2 October 1853: Opened
- 15 June 1959: Closed
Location

Tallington railway station was a station in Tallington, Lincolnshire on the Great Northern Railway between Grantham and Peterborough. It was closed in 1959, however the former goods yard is still open and is used by the Dow-Mac works at Tallington for delivery of concrete beams, bridge supports, sleepers, etc. by rail.

Preceding station	Historical railways	Following station
Peterborough North; Line and station open	Great Northern Railway	Essendine; Line open, station closed
