= Cowbit =

Village and civil parish in Lincolnshire, England

Coordinates: 52.743769°N 0.134059°W

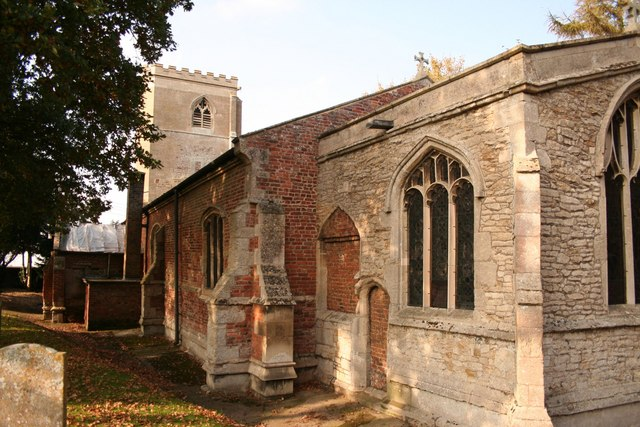
- Church of St Mary, Cowbit

- Location within Lincolnshire
- Population: 1,220 (2011)
- OS grid reference: TF260178
  - London: 85 mi (137 km) S
- District: South Holland
- Shire county: Lincolnshire
- Region: East Midlands
- Country: England
- Sovereign state: United Kingdom
- Post town: Spalding
- Postcode district: PE12
- Police: Lincolnshire
- Fire: Lincolnshire
- Ambulance: East Midlands
- UK Parliament: South Holland and The Deepings

Cowbit (locally pronounced Cubbit) is a village and civil parish in the South Holland district of Lincolnshire, England. The population of the civil parish at the 2011 census was 1,220. It is situated 3 miles (5 km) south from Spalding and 5 miles (8 km) north from Crowland.

Cowbit falls within the drainage area of the Welland and Deepings Internal Drainage Board.

Cowbit Grade I listed Anglican parish church is dedicated to St Mary. The church was built on a small scale in the 14th century by Prior de Moulton of Spalding. A chancel and Perpendicular tower were added by Bishop Russell of Lincoln in 1487. Restoration was carried out in 1882. A Wesleyan chapel was built in 1842, and rebuilt in 1861. To the south, on the road to the hamlet of Peak Hill, is a stone named after St Guthlac, being a boundary marker for the earlier lands of Crowland Abbey.

The village contains a Grade II listed early 19th-century mill, a Church of England primary school, public play area, village hall, a garage, and a village store.

On 16 October 2011, work was completed on a new bypass for the A1073, which previously ran through the village. This new route has been re-designated to form part of the A16.

Cowbit previously had a railway station on Spalding to March line; the line is no longer in use.

Cowbit Wash lies to the west of the village, extends 8 miles (13 km) from north to south, and is nearly 1 mile (1.6 km) broad. Mainly arable land, it is a flood plain for the navigable River Welland, separated from Cowbit by an earth bank, Barrier Bank, that carries an unclassified road, the former A1073. Previously Welland overflow regularly flooded the Wash, the water freezing-over during winter allowing for ice skating and skating championships. A relief channel (Coronation Channel) for the Welland at Spalding made Cowbit Wash obsolete for many decades following its construction but during the winter of 2023-24 following months of heavy rainfall and Storm Henk the River Welland breached its banks near Crowland subsequently flooding the wash for the very first time since 1947.

Since Queen Victoria's Diamond Jubilee in 1897 there has been a punt gun salute over Cowbit Wash every coronation and jubilee, concurrent with gun salutes in London, including the June 2012 Diamond Jubilee of Elizabeth II.

== Notable people ==
- Charles Chattell (1932–2020) of 5 Clarkson Avenue appeared as an East German station master in the film Octopussy; filming began on 6 September 1982.
