= William Henry Wheeler =

- Born: 1832
- Died: 1915 (aged 82–83)
- Education: King's College London
- Occupations: Engineer, inventor, antiquarian, architect, author

William Henry Wheeler (1832–1915) was an English civil engineer, author, architect, inventor and antiquarian.

Wheeler was born in Hammersmith in 1832. He read for a degree at King's College London, and in 1867 became a member of the Institution of Civil Engineers, from which he was the recipient of the Telford Medal. He later became a member of the British Association, The Royal Agricultural Society and the International Congress on Navigation.

For forty-four years he was the Borough and Harbour Engineer of Boston, Lincolnshire, and there designed the town's New Dock, built between 1882 and 1884. He designed Boston Corporation's swimming baths, opened in 1880, Lincolnshire's first public park, and Boston Cottage Hospital, which opened in 1875 and later became Pilgrim Hospital. He carried out commercial and residential work, including designing a Jacobean-style staircase for a house on Boston High Street, and designed his own house on London Road which today is a preparatory school.

Wheeler was an authority in the field of low-lying land reclamation and Lincolnshire history, writing books on the topics including The History of the Fens of South Lincolnshire. He was an inventor of the eroder-dredger for which he received a bronze medal at the St Louis Exhibition, a freemason, and a member of Boston's Rifle Volunteer Corps, becoming its quartermaster sergeant.

He married Martha E. Sills of Casthorpe, near Barrowby, Lincolnshire, they producing two sons who both drowned at sea, and a daughter. He died in Bromley in 1915; his cremated remains were interred in St Nicholas' churchyard, Skirbeck, a church where he provided two stained glass windows in memory of his wife and sons.

== Bibliography ==
- A Practical Manual of Tides and Waves, reprint, HardPress Publishing (2013). ISBN 9781313055079
- The sea-coast: (1) Destruction (2) Littoral drift (3) Protection, reprint, Nabu Press (2010). ISBN 1172201927
- A history of the fens of south Lincolnshire, being a description of the rivers Witham and Welland and their estuary, and an account of the reclamation, drainage, and enclosure of the fens adjacent thereto (1897), reprint, Book on Demand. ISBN 1275175686
