= West Deeping =

Village and civil parish in Lincolnshire, England

Coordinates: 52.6657°N 0.3598°W

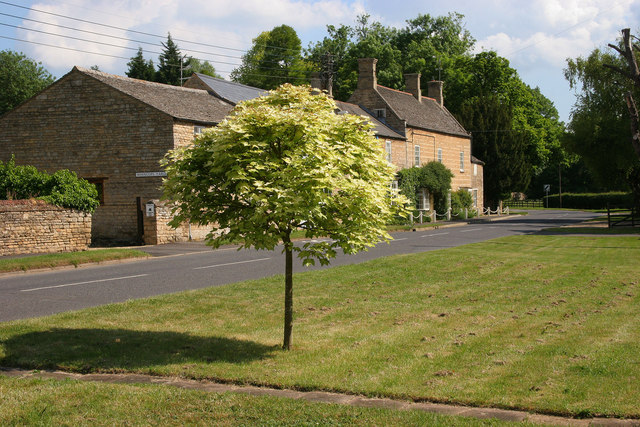
- King Street, West Deeping

- Location within Lincolnshire
- Population: 255 (2011)
- OS grid reference: TF109092
  - London: 85 mi (137 km) S
- District: South Kesteven
- Shire county: Lincolnshire
- Region: East Midlands
- Country: England
- Sovereign state: United Kingdom
- Post town: PETERBOROUGH
- Postcode district: PE6
- Police: Lincolnshire
- Fire: Lincolnshire
- Ambulance: East Midlands
- UK Parliament: South Holland and The Deepings

West Deeping is a village and civil parish in the South Kesteven district of Lincolnshire, England. The population of the civil parish at the 2011 census was 255. It is situated on the A1175 road, 5 miles (8 km) east from Stamford and 2 miles (3.2 km) west from Market Deeping. It is the smallest of The Deepings group of villages situated around the A1175 road. Village population is 277.

The name 'Deeping' comes from the Old English deoping meaning 'deep place'.

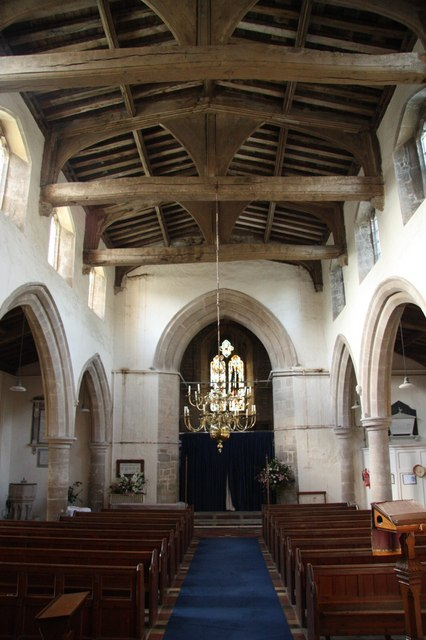
Nave of St Andrew's Church, West Deeping

The Roman road of King Street passes through the village and crosses the A1175.

The church of St Andrew dates back to the 13th century, with further additions in 1676 and 1803 and a restoration in 1876–77, and is Early English, Decorated and Perpendicular in style. It is part of The Uffington Group of the Deanery of Stamford, in the Diocese of Lincoln.

The village public house is the Red Lion.
