= Deeping =

Deeping may refer to:

- The settlements of, and within The Deepings in Lincolnshire, England:
  - Market Deeping
  - Deeping St James
  - Deeping St Nicholas
  - Deeping Gate
  - West Deeping
- Warwick Deeping (1877-1950), English author
- HMT Warwick Deeping, British anti-submarine trawler in World War II
