= Spalding Common =

Area near Spalding in Lincolnshire, England

Coordinates: 52.761744°N 0.180551°W

- Location within Lincolnshire
  - London: 95 mi (153 km) S
- Civil parish: Unparished
- District: South Holland
- Shire county: Lincolnshire
- Region: East Midlands
- Country: England
- Sovereign state: United Kingdom
- Post town: SPALDING
- Postcode district: PE11
- Police: Lincolnshire
- Fire: Lincolnshire
- Ambulance: East Midlands
- UK Parliament: South Holland and The Deepings

Spalding Common is an area south-west of Spalding in Lincolnshire, England, near Little London. Part of Deeping Fen, it includes farmland that was drained following parliamentary enclosure in 1801. Along its eastern edge, suburban housing has emerged since the late 19th century. Residents are served by a community hall, which opened in 1956. A primary school, Goodfellows School, operated from 1871 to 2004, and there was a baptist chapel at the Common from 1870 to 1966.

== History ==
=== Prehistory ===
Remains of an Iron Age and Roman settlement, including a small cemetery, were discovered on a site at Spalding Common during housing development in 2024.

=== Fenland ===
Spalding Common is part of Deeping Fen. Another section of Deeping Fen had been enclosed and partly drained in the 17th century by a group called the Adventurers, but the common lands north-east of this, by Spalding and Pinchbeck, remained undrained and unenclosed; until the beginning of the 19th century, part of Spalding Common was used as a reservoir for water drained from other parts of the Deeping Fen.

Spalding Common was enclosed by an Act of Parliament in 1801. This was part of a wider process of enclosure and draining of the common lands around Deeping Fen; Spalding Common was the first of these lands to be fenced and drained, with portions sold off to pay for later works. On the edge of the Common, Little London emerged as a settlement along the turnpike road to Deeping. In 1848 the Common was described as "a large tract of inclosed fen ... now well drained and in a profitable state of cultivation". Late-19th-century Ordnance Survey maps show that Spalding Common was south-west of the built-up area of Spalding and west of the River Welland.

=== Housing and amenities ===
By 1892, housing had emerged in the area. In 1924, Spalding Urban District Council purchased land at Spalding Common to build 22 council houses, of which 20 were completed by 1925. Another housing development, at Goodfellows Road, was completed in 1939. In the late 1980s, planning permission was granted to build over 20 homes on a site off Spalding Common; the developer began advertising homes at the site, known as Fantail Close, in 1989. A development of 135 homes at the former Millfield Nursery commenced in 2022 and is due to be finished in 2025.

Spalding Common Baptist Church opened in 1870, but closed in 1966; the building has since been demolished. Goodfellows School opened at Spalding Common in 1871, and became a Church of England primary school in 1941; it closed in 2004; its buildings were demolished in 2019 and a care home was built on the site. By 1921, there was a Post Office at Spalding Common. Spalding Common Community Hall opened in March 1956 on land purchased in 1955 by the Spalding Common Community Fund, which had been founded in 1953 to raise money for the project; in 1975 the hall was destroyed in an arson attack, and a replacement opened in December 1976 at a cost of £20,000.

== Transport and community ==
Residents are served by the buses between Spalding and Peterborough, Bourne, Market Deeping and Stamford. The Spalding Western Relief Road is also proposed to run to a roundabout nearby if built.

As of 2025, Spalding Common Community Hall operates at 25 Spalding Common.

There is also a local volunteer group who litterpick around Spalding named "The Wombles of Spalding Common".
