= Little London, Spalding =

Suburb of Spalding in Lincolnshire, England

Coordinates: 52.774243°N 0.163853°W

Little London
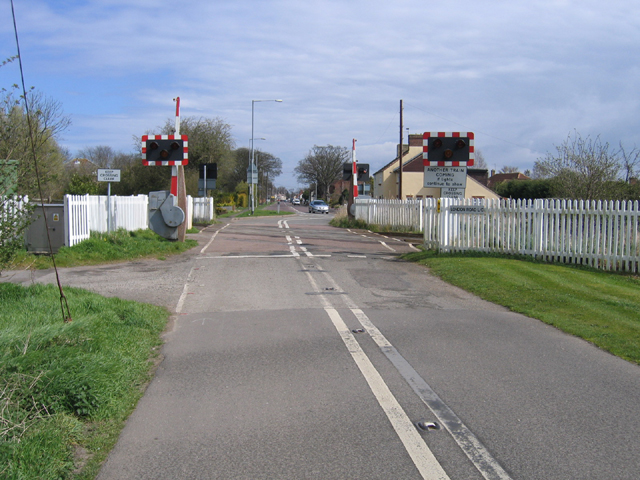
- London Road level crossing in Little London

- Location within the United Kingdom
- Population: 136
  - London: 90 mi (140 km) S
- Civil parish: Unparished
- District: South Holland
- Shire county: Lincolnshire
- Region: East Midlands
- Post town: SPALDING
- Postcode district: PE9
- Police
- Fire
- Ambulance
- UK Parliament: South Holland and The Deepings

Little London is a settlement south-west of Spalding in South Holland in Lincolnshire, England. It is near the confluence of the River Welland and Hill's Drain, and sits near the edge of Deeping Fen. The settlement emerged south-west of the Hawthorn Bank tollbar on the turnpike to Deeping St James, following the enclosure and draining of Spalding Common in the early 19th century. It provided services to residents of the Common so that they did not have to pay the toll to access the town. Though originally a discrete settlement, it has been absorbed into Spalding's urban area by large planned housing developments built in the 20th and 21st centuries. Little London had its own Primitive Methodist chapel between 1829 and 1985. Residents are also served Spalding Common Community Hall, which opened in 1956.

== History ==
=== Origins and development ===
In 1763, an Act of Parliament was passed to turnpike Littleworth Drove which extended from Spalding to Deeping St James across Deeping Fen. The closest tollbar to Spalding was at Hawthorn Bank, where the fen ended. In 1801, the common lands at Deeping Fen were enclosed and this included Spalding Common, which also ended at Hawthorn Bank. Following enclosure, the Common was drained and cultivated. After this, a settlement emerge south-west of Hawthorn Bank along the road, consisting of tradespeople, inns and shops catering for residents of the Common, who preferred to use their services as this did not requiring crossing the tollbar and paying to access services in Spalding town. As the road ultimately continued on to London, the settlement became known as Little London. By the late 1880s, the Ordnance Survey map shows that Little London by then also included two windmills, a corn mill and a public house, Oat Sheaf Inn. In the early 1890s, Lord Carrington provided agricultural smallholdings and allotments at Little London, including 33 acres (13 ha) of allotments.

In the 1960s and 1970s, private housing developers began acquiring greenfield land at Little London, and the area has been substantially developed with housing in the 20th century, including between Little London and the Welland, and in the 21st century to the north of Little London. These and other developments adjoining Spalding, have brought the settlement into the town's urban area.

=== The Raceground ===
To the west of what became Little London were fields used for racing horses in the 18th century, and that area became known as The Raceground, a name which persisted into at least the 1970s.

=== Amenities ===
Little had previously had a Sunday School which was mentioned in 1864. The area is recorded as having a Primitive Methodist chapel, built in 1829 but closed in 1985; as of 1995 it was in use as a storehouse. Spalding Common Community Hall opened in March 1956, and was rebuilt in December 1976 following a fire, at a cost of £20,000. As of 2025, Spalding Common Community Hall continues to operate at 25 Spalding Common; as set out in its governing documents, the hall's charitable purpose includes use by the residents of Spalding Common and Little London for meetings, lessons, and other leisure activities.
