= Deeping Fen =

Area in Lincolnshire, England

Coordinates: 52.7284°N 0.20205°W

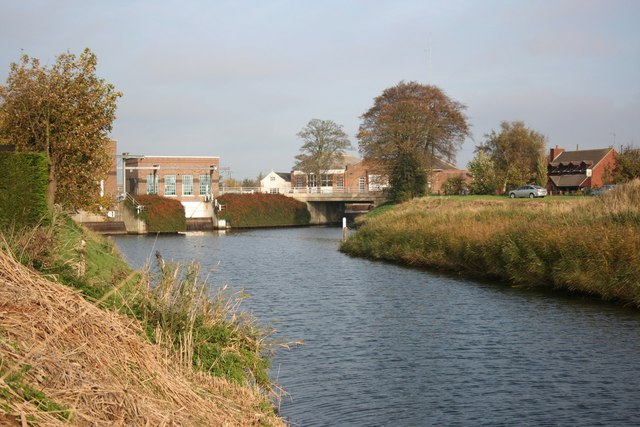
- The electric pumping station at Pode Hole, known as the Adventurers pumping station

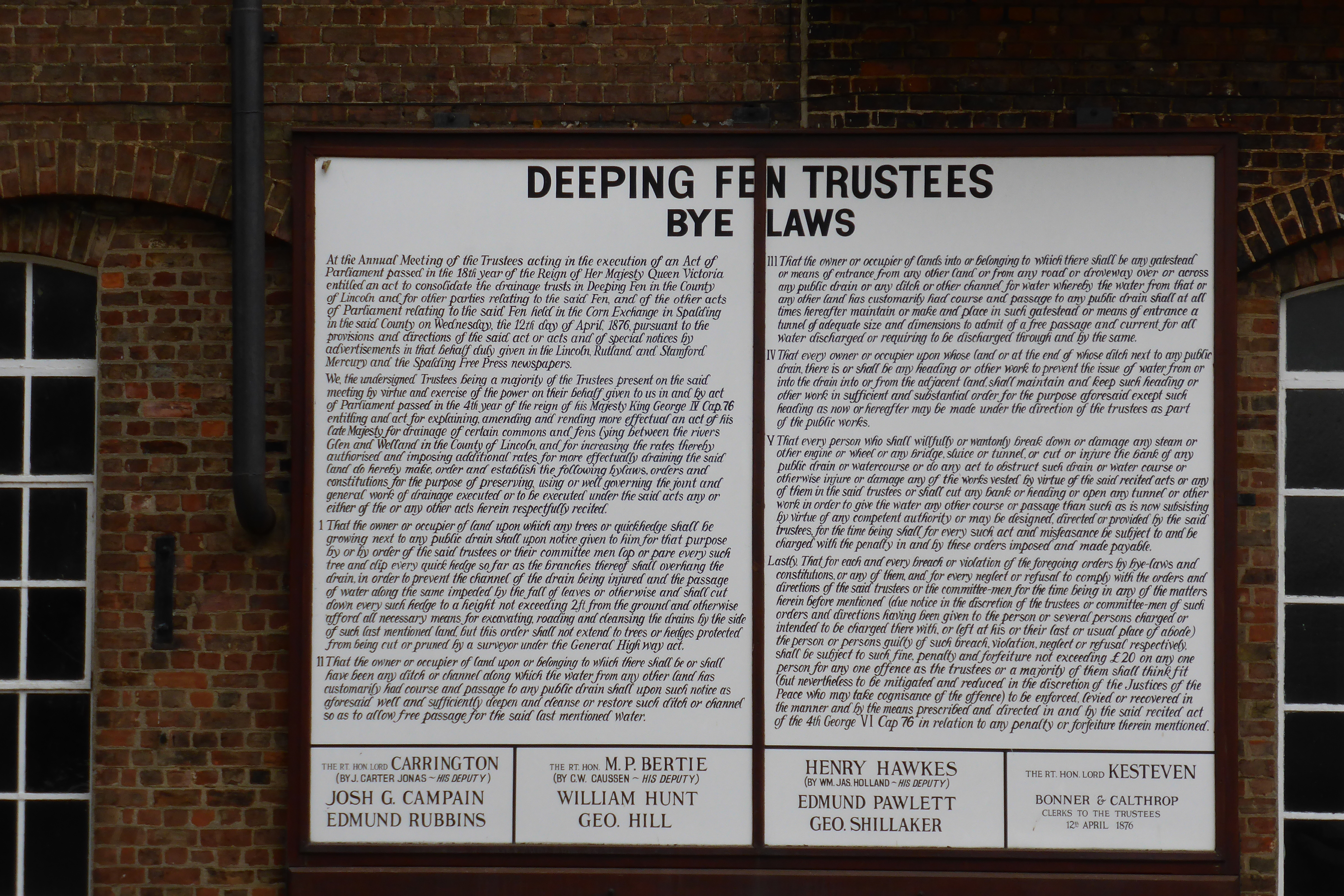
- Bylaws posted on the old pump station

- Location within Lincolnshire
- Population: 1,961
- OS grid reference: TF215160
  - London: 85 mi (137 km) S
- Civil parish: Deeping St Nicholas
- District: South Holland
- Shire county: Lincolnshire
- Region: East Midlands
- Country: England
- Sovereign state: United Kingdom
- Postcode district: PE6
- UK Parliament: South Holland and The Deepings

Deeping Fen is a low-lying area in the South Holland district of Lincolnshire, England, which covers approximately 47 square miles (120 km^{2}). It is bounded by the River Welland and the River Glen, and is extensively drained, but the efficient drainage of the land exercised the minds of several of the great civil engineers of the 17th and 18th centuries.

Drainage schemes were first authorised during the reign of Queen Elizabeth I, but from 1632, a group of adventurers took control of the drainage, in return for which they were granted land. They faced the problem that the outfalls of the River Welland and the River Glen were not sufficiently low to enable proper drainage by gravity, and most schemes included improvement to the rivers. John Perry, an engineer of some repute, who had set the standard for engineering reports in 1727, began work in 1730, and was followed by John Grundy, Sr., a pioneer in applying scientific principles to civil engineering problems. His son, John Grundy, Jr., was another capable engineer, who was retained as a consultant after he resigned as full-time Surveyor of Works.

In 1800 the civil engineers William Jessop and John Rennie assisted local engineers with plans for improvements, the chief of which was for a steam pumping station. This plan was not implemented immediately, but two steam engines fitted with scoop wheels were installed at Pode Hole in 1823. The pumping station was the largest in the Fens at the time, and remained so for many years. Steam gradually gave way to diesel engines and scoop wheels were replaced by centrifugal pumps, and the diesel engines were then replaced by electric motors. However, the beam engine and scoop wheel at Pinchbeck Marsh, which ran from 1833 to 1952, was not scrapped, and can be visited by the public.

From 1801 the fen was managed by trustees, appointed under the terms of the Kesteven and Holland Inclosures and Drainage Act 1801, and this remained the case until 1939 when the administrative structure was replaced by the Welland & Deepings Internal Drainage Board.

== Location ==
Deeping Fen is a low-lying area bounded by the River Welland and the River Glen, which meet at its northern tip, covering around 47 square miles (120 km^{2}). It was originally an extra-parochial liberty, as it was formed of waste land which had previously belonged to a number of other parishes, but because it had been reclaimed by Adventurers, was free from land tax and ecclesiastical tithes. About half of the fen became the parish of Deeping St Nicholas in 1846, which became a civil parish in reforms authorised by an act of Parliament of 1856.

The name of the fen is derived from the Old English 'Deoping', which means a "deep or low place". The village was listed as "Estdeping" in the Domesday Book, an inventory of the country compiled in 1086.

== History ==
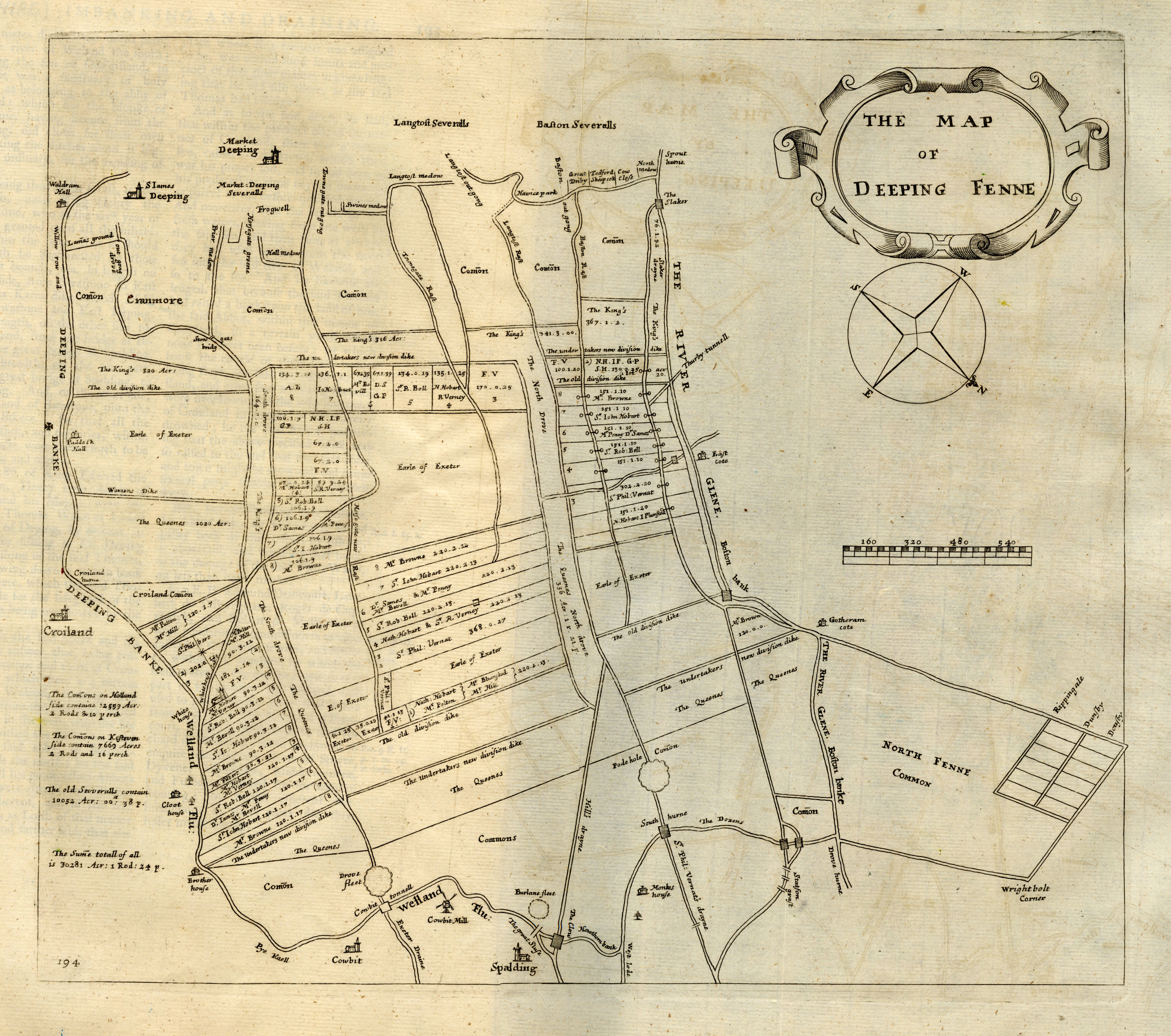
The Map of Deeping Fenne from "The history of imbanking and drayning" by William Dugdale (1662).

People of Market Deeping, Deeping Gate and Deeping St James, together with other villages along the River Welland, presented a petition to Elizabeth I, requesting that the fens should be drained, as the banks of the river and of the neighbouring River Glen were in a poor state of repair. They suggested that Thomas Lovell should undertake the work, which he did, at a cost of £12,000, for which he received 15,000 acres (6,100 ha) of the land which was reclaimed as a result of the work. Unrest in the early 1600s resulted in most of the works being destroyed, but in 1632 a group of adventurers led by the Earl of Bedford were granted permission to drain Deeping Fen, South Fen and Croyland. The work included making the Welland deeper and wider from Deeping St James to its outfall beyond Spalding, and the construction of side drains. These included a drain running from Pode Hole to below Spalding, which is still known as Vernatt's Drain, after one of the adventurers called Sir Philibert Vernatti. Although declared completed in 1637, efficient drainage would have to wait until the construction of Pode Hole pumping station in 1827.

Draining Deeping Fen Act 1664
- Act of Parliament
- Parliament of England
- Long title: An Act for drayning of the Fenn called Deeping Fenn and other Fenns therin mentioned.
- Citation: 16 & 17 Cha. 2. c. 11 (Note: Also listed as 16 & 17 Cha. 2. c. 20 Pr.)
- Territorial extent: England and Wales

Dates
- Royal assent: 2 March 1665
- Commencement: 24 November 1664 (Note: Start of session.)
- Repealed: 30 July 1856
Other legislation
Amends	Relief of Thomas Lovell Act 1603
Repealed by	Deeping Fen Drainage Act 1856
Relates to	Deeping Fen Drainage Act 1737

Status: Repealed

Text of statute as originally enacted

The drainage of the fen was again addressed when the Draining Deeping Fen Act 1664 (16 & 17 Cha. 2. c. 11) awarded the Earl of Manchester and others 10,000 acres (4,000 ha) of land in return for the drainage works. They were also obliged to maintain the banks of the Welland. The inadequacy of its outfall and a spate of bad weather stopped them from completing their task. They tried renting out the land they had been granted, but many tenants were unable to pay the rent, due to the poor state of the drainage which reduced crop yields. In April 1729, the Deeping Fen Adventurers received a letter from Captain John Perry, expressing the opinion that the only way to improve the drainage was to improve the river outfalls, and proposing the construction of scouring sluices on the river at Spalding, on Vernatt's drain at its outfall, and on the River Glen at Surfleet. Perry was an engineer of some repute, who had set the standard for engineering reports in 1727, when he published his recommendations for the North Level of the Fens. His plans were approved, and the Adventurers offered to give him land covering nearly 6,000 acres (2,400 ha) in payment for the work. He sold one third of the land to finance the project, and began work in 1730. Cowbit sluice on the Welland had six 6-foot (1.8 m) wide gates which were operated by chains connected to a treadwheel. At high tide, water was penned in Cowbit Wash, between banks which were set well back from the main channel. At low tide, the sluice gates were opened, and the flow scoured out silt from the river bed for some 3 miles (4.8 km) downstream. Perry died in February 1733, before the other works were completed, and was buried in Spalding churchyard.

=== Scientific drainage ===
Perry was succeeded by John Grundy, Sr., who had arrived in the region in 1731 at the request of the Duke of Buccleuch, who wanted his estates surveyed. Perry was building the Spalding sluice at the time, and Grundy's work allowed him to study drains, banks, sluices and outfalls. He formed the opinion that mathematical and philosophical principles should be applied to the drainage of low-lying regions. In 1733, he surveyed the parish of Moulton, a little further downstream, to assess how drainage could be improved for the Commissioners of Sewers. He demonstrated the use of a telescopic spirit level, which enabled him to achieve accurate levels, with errors of less than 1 inch per mile (2 cm per km). Next he addressed the issue of flow in open drains. Using his mathematical principles, he calculated that water in a drain which was 4 miles (6.4 km) long, and had a fall of 12 inches (30 cm) over its length should travel at around 4 feet per second (1.2 m/s), taking 1 hour and 28 minutes to travel the length of the drain. Observations in the field showed him that other factors, such as fluid friction, resulted in the actual flow rate being less than half of this. He published a paper of his findings in April 1734, and insisted that accurate mapping and levels, together with physical observation of drains and rivers, were essential to deciding how fenland could best be drained. In the same month, he began working for the Adventurers of Deeping Fen, to produce a drainage scheme. He spent some time mapping 22 miles (35 km) of the Welland, and his chief recommendation was for a reservoir and sluice at the outfall of the River Glen, which would enable the outfall to be scoured at low tide, by releasing water from the reservoir.

Deeping Fen Drainage Act 1737
- Act of Parliament
- Parliament of Great Britain
- Long title: An Act to enable the Adventurers, Owners, and Proprietors, of the Taxable Lands, and the Owners and Proprietors of the Free Lands, in Deeping Fens, and other Fens, in the County of Lincoln, therein mentioned, to raise a competent Sum of Money, for the effectual Draining and future Preservation of all the said Fens, according to their Agreement in that Behalf, and to carry the said Agreement into Execution; and for other Purposes therein mentioned.
- Citation: 11 Geo. 2. c. 39
- Territorial extent: Great Britain

Dates
- Royal assent: 20 May 1738
- Commencement: 24 June 1738 (Note: Section 1.)
- Repealed: 30 July 1856
Other legislation
Repealed by	Deeping Fen Drainage Act 1856
Relates to	Draining Deeping Fen Act 1664

Status: Repealed

Text of statute as originally enacted

In July 1737 Grundy and Humphry Smith set out their plans for the fen, and a bill was put before Parliament, to allow the Adventurers to raise the £15,000 estimated cost by taxes. The act was granted in 1738, and Smith and Grundy were appointed "Surveyors and Agents of Deeping Fen." They oversaw a programme of repairs to the Deeping Bank, which ran for 12 miles (19 km) along the south-eastern edge of the fen, protecting it from the Welland. John Scribo did the same for the Country Bank, which ran for 6 miles (9.7 km) on the far side of the river. Grundy made the river deeper above Spalding, and also constructed a sluice and reservoir at the mouth of the Glen. The reservoir covered 8 acres (3.2 ha) and provided water to scour the channel below the sluice. Two drainage mills were constructed, each with a 16-foot (4.9 m) scoop wheel, one on Vernatt's Drain and the other on Hill's Drain. The bed of the Glen had also been regraded and its banks raised by 1742, when Smith retired and Grundy took sole charge of the works. He oversaw the job of making the Welland through Spalding deeper and wider, and suggested that the outfall of Vernatt's Drain should be moved 2.5 miles (4.0 km) downstream from its existing position. Although not implemented immediately, his son completed this task in 1774. Grundy died in 1748, having been a pioneer in applying scientific principles to civil engineering problems.

=== Civil engineers ===
John Grundy, Jr., took over as Surveyor of Works after the death of his father in 1748, and spent nearly £10,000 on repairs to the Deeping Bank and the Country bank between then and 1764. He rebuilt Perry's sluice on the Welland soon after 1750, with taller doors and a set of tide gates to prevent the tide moving upstream. In 1755 three more drainage mills were built on Hills Drain, while a sluice on the Forty Foot Drain followed in 1758. From 1759 to 1761 he was engaged in lowering the bed of the Welland below the outfall sluice by 2.5 feet (0.76 m). After 1764, Thomas Hogard became the Surveyor of Works, but Grundy continued to act as a consultant engineer.

Hogard devised a scheme to cut a new channel from the junction of the Welland and the Glen to Wyberton, on the estuary of the River Witham below Boston. At the end of the 7.5-mile (12.1 km) cut, there would be a huge sluice and a navigation lock. The Adventurers asked Thomas Tofield for a second opinion, who suggested a shorter 5-mile (8.0 km) cut from Spalding to Fosdyke. They requested help from Grundy, who proposed a 1.5-mile (2.4 km) cut to Fosdyke, and that the outfall of Vernatt's drain should be moved downstream as his father had suggested. Improvements to the drain were carried out under an act of Parliament obtained in 1774, and an act was obtained in 1794 to sanction the Wyberton cut, although the work was not carried out, and Grundy's shorter cut was built under a new act of 1801.

The fen was inundated in 1798, and the civil engineers William Jessop and John Rennie were asked to assist the local engineers Edward Hare and George Maxwell. There was a clear understanding that the outfalls were too high to allow proper drainage by gravity, and two possible solutions were considered. The first was an outfall at a lower level, which would involve hugh expense in its construction, and the second, favoured by Jessop and Rennie, was the provision of steam pumping engines at Pode Hole. These would pump water from the internal drains of the fen to Vernatt's Drain, and the lower internal water levels would allow the existing wind-powered drainage mills to work efficiently. A report was produced, which formed the basis for the Deeping Fen Act 1801. The channel of the Welland above Spalding was made deeper, the north bank was made stronger, and the North and South Drove Drains which crossed the fen to join Vernatt's Drain at Pode Hole were made deeper. At the time there were no steam engines working in the fens, and Rennie's recommendation of a steam pumping station at Pode Hole was not implemented.

=== Pumping stations ===
After reports by Rennie and Thomas Pear in 1815, and by Rennie alone in 1818 and 1820, the provision of steam engines was authorised by an act in 1823. The land which formed the North Drove was at a lower level to that in the South Drove, and so it was intended to keep the water at different levels in each drain, so that a less powerful engine could be built to pump the South Drove Drain. By the time the details had been finalised, engines of 60 hp (45 kW) and 80 hp (60 kW) were ordered. Both engines were beam engines. The larger one was manufactured by Butterley, was called the Holland engine, and drove a scoop wheel which was 28 feet (8.5 m) in diameter. The wheel had 40 scoops and lifted the water by 5 feet (1.5 m). The smaller engine, which was called the Kesteven engine, was made by Fenton & Murrey, and drove a similar scoop wheel. They were operational by August 1825, having cost £26,673. The pumping station was the largest in the Fens at the time, and remained so for many years.

Upgrading of the plant occurred several times. The Kesteven and Holland engines were overhauled in 1881 and 1883 respectively. Flow into the wheel pits was restricted by the provision of shuttles, and rising breasts were fitted on the outflow, so that the height at which the water was discharged could be varied as the water level in Vernatt's drain varied. Five new boilers, which could supply either engine, were fitted in 1883, and had been replaced by five more some time before 1928, for the new boilers failed in that year. The Kesteven engine had its scoop wheel removed, although the rest of the plant was not scrapped until 1952.

Two 100 hp (75 kW) twin-cylinder diesel engines were installed to aid the steam plant, the first in 1914 and the second in 1920. They were made by Mirrlees, and were scrapped in 1956. Following the demise of the steam engines, a Mirrlees 250 hp (190 kW) five-cylinder diesel engine, which drove a 54-inch (140 cm) pump was obtained. The first electric pump was installed in 1939, to be joined by three more in 1957, once the Mirrlees engines had been decommissioned. A new engine house was built in 1964, which held two 650 hp (480 kW) Ruston diesel engines driving 60-inch (150 cm) Gwynnes Limited pumps, and a third 410 hp (310 kW) Ruston unit, fitted with a 50-inch (130 cm) Gwynnes pump. The remaining Mirrlees engine and the first electric pump were scrapped at this time.

=== Other districts ===
Pinchbeck South Fen is a region covering 1,700 acres (690 ha) lying on the west side of Vernatt's Drain. It was originally managed as the Fourth District by the Deeping Fen trustees, but was independent in 1828, when the occupants approached the trustees with a plan to drain some of the water from the fen to the Pode Hole pumps. A tunnel already existed under Vernatt's drain, and so the trustees agreed. However, the charges levied by the trustees for this service rose dramatically, so that the South Fen residents decided to build their own pumping engine at Pode Hole in 1830. A Fenton & Murray beam engine driving a 20-foot (6.1 m) scoop wheel was installed, at a cost of £3,000, which was considerably less than the charge the trustees wanted to make. The engine was replaced by a suction gas engine and Ruston pump in 1919, which was decommissioned in 1943 when a Petter oil engine with a 20-inch (51 cm) Gwynnes pump was installed. This only lasted for ten years, as two electric motors driving 24-inch (61 cm) and 20-inch (51 cm) pumps were fitted in 1953.

Pinchbeck Marsh was also part of Deeping Fen, but following the failure of the work carried out under the 1801 Act to effectively drain the area, an act of Parliament was obtained in 1832 to create a separate district, called the Spalding and Pinchbeck District, or Blue Gowt, as water from the 6,000 acres (2,400 ha) feeds into the River Glen from the Blue Gowt Drain. A 20 hp (15 kW) Butterley beam engine driving a 22-foot (6.7 m) scoop wheel was installed in 1833. Although a new boiler was installed in 1895, the engine and wheel continued to operate until 1952, making it the last beam engine and scoop wheel combination to be used in the Fens, and also the one which ran for the longest time. Its function was replaced by the two electric pumps fitted in 1953, which also pump the Pinchbeck South Fen, but the plant was retained, and is now open to the public, although the steam engine is now turned by an electric motor.

The management of Deeping Fen by trustees, appointed under the terms of the 1801 Act, continued until they were replaced in 1939 by the Deeping Fen, Spalding and Pinchbeck Internal Drainage Board, which became part of the Welland & Deepings Internal Drainage Board, when it amalgamated with three other local internal drainage boards in 1973.

== See also ==
- Pinchbeck Engine
- Pode Hole
- Vernatt's Drain
- The Deepings

== Bibliography ==
- Boyes, John; Russell, Ronald (1977). The Canals of Eastern England. David and Charles. ISBN 978-0-7153-7415-3.
- Brabner, J.H.F., ed. (1895). "The Comprehensive Gazetteer of England and Wales". Archived from the original on 27 September 2011.
- Hills, Richard L. (2008). The Drainage of the Fens. Landmark Publishing Ltd. ISBN 978-1-84306-323-0.
- Hinde, K. S. G. (2006). Fenland Pumping Engines. Landmark Publishing Ltd. ISBN 978-1-84306-188-5.
- Lewis, Samuel, ed. (1831). "A Topographical Dictionary of England". British History Online.
- Mills, A. D. (1998). A Dictionary of English Place-Names. Oxford University Press. ISBN 978-0-19-280074-9.
- Raithby, John, ed. (1819). Statutes of the Realm. Vol. 5: 1628–80. pp. 559–568, Charles II, 1664 & 1665, An Act for drayning of the Fenn called Deeping Fenn and other Fenns therin mentioned.
- Roberts, R. A., ed. (1910). Calendar of the Cecil Papers in Hatfield House. Vol. 12: 1602–1603. pp. 157–180, 'May 1602, 16–31'.
- Skempton, Sir Alec; et al. (2002). A Biographical Dictionary of Civil Engineers in Great Britain and Ireland: Vol 1: 1500 to 1830. Thomas Telford. ISBN 978-0-7277-2939-2.
