= Stowgate =

Hamlet in Lincolnshire, England

Coordinates: 52.6808°N 0.2382°W

- Location within Lincolnshire
- OS grid reference: TF192107
  - London: 80 mi (130 km) S
- District: South Kesteven
- Shire county: Lincolnshire
- Region: East Midlands
- Country: England
- Sovereign state: United Kingdom
- Post town: PETERBOROUGH
- Postcode district: PE6
- Dialling code: 01778
- Police: Lincolnshire
- Fire: Lincolnshire
- Ambulance: East Midlands
- UK Parliament: South Holland and The Deepings

Stowgate is a hamlet and shrunken village in the South Kesteven district of Lincolnshire, England. It is situated approximately 2 miles (3 km) north-east from Deeping St James, and is linked to the Deepings group of villages.

Stowgate contains very few houses, most of which are farmhouses. The settlement grew up around Stowgate Farm – the farmhouse of which still exists – which was divided into a number of smaller farms intended to provide housing and agricultural land for those who contributed to war effort. One farm was demolished in the 1950s.

An Ordnance Survey map from 1898 provides a visual record of Stowgate Farm during that period.
