= Hop Pole =

Hamlet in Lincolnshire, England

Coordinates: 52.710°N 0.245°W

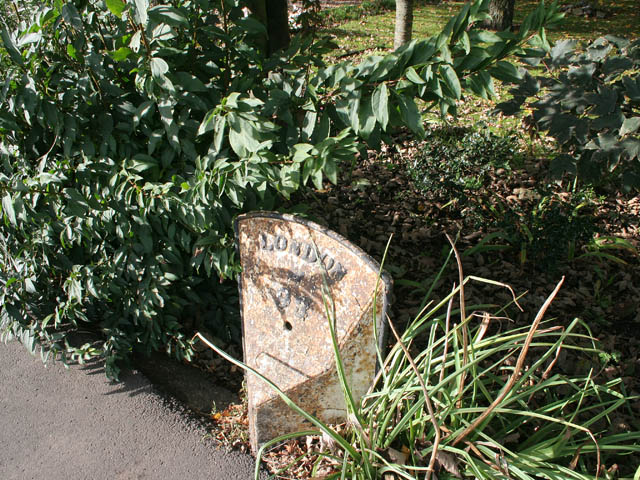
- Victorian cast-iron milepost by Littleworth Drove

- Location within Lincolnshire
- Population: 105
- OS grid reference: TF186140
  - London: 80 mi (130 km) S
- Civil parish: Deeping St. Nicholas
- District: South Holland
- Shire county: Lincolnshire
- Region: East Midlands
- Country: England
- Sovereign state: United Kingdom
- Post town: SPALDING
- Postcode district: PE11
- Dialling code: 01775
- Police: Lincolnshire
- Fire: Lincolnshire
- Ambulance: East Midlands
- UK Parliament: South Holland and The Deepings

Hop Pole is a hamlet in the South Holland district of Lincolnshire, England. It is situated between Deeping St James and Deeping St Nicholas, and on the A1175 Littleworth Drove road.

No separate population statistic is available for Hop Pole. The best available report is for the whole Deeping St Nicholas civil parish with a total of 1323 people within 505 dwellings. There are approximately 40 homes in Hop Pole, around 105 people pro-rata.

Hop Pole falls within the drainage area of the Welland and Deepings Internal Drainage Board. Hop Pole had three pubs: The Oat Sheaf Inn (closed 1957 and since demolished), The Blue Bell Inn (closed 2012 and now a motorhome stop-over site) and the Hop Pole Inn (closed in 1928 following the death of its long-serving landlord, Charles Stainsby).

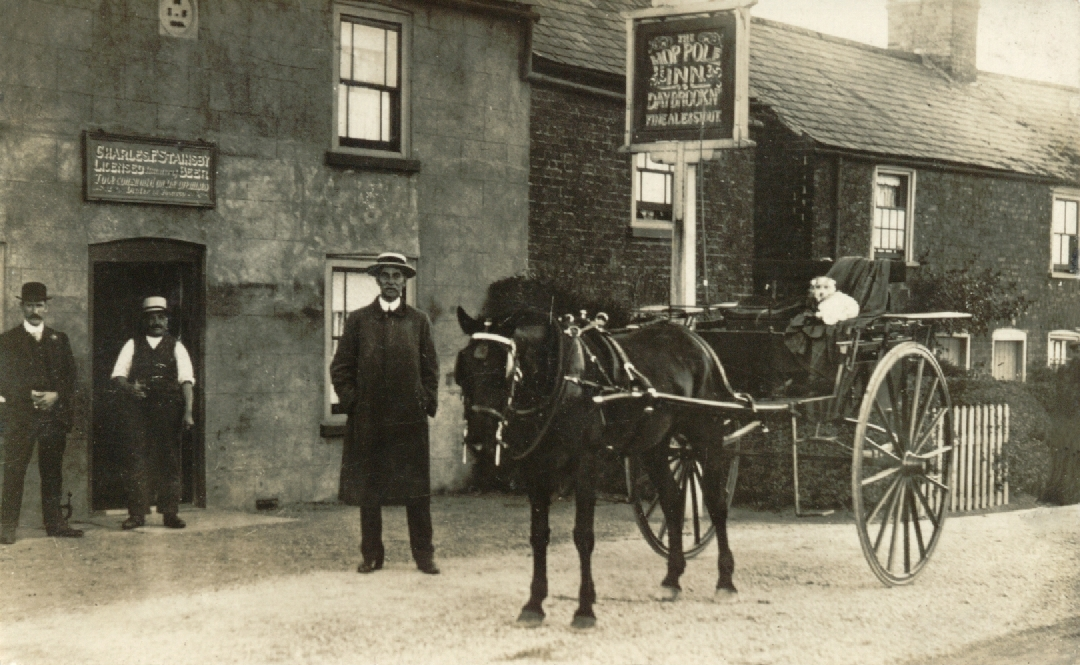
The Hop Pole Inn, undated 1920s postcard
