= Frognall =

Village in Lincolnshire, England

Coordinates: 52.677°N 0.281°W

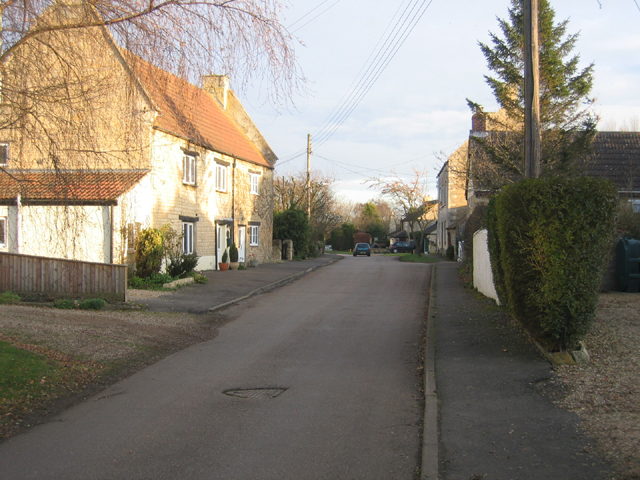
- Frognall

- Location within Lincolnshire
- Population: 7,929
- OS grid reference: TF 16318 10197
  - London: 80 mi (130 km) south
- Civil parish: Deeping St James
- District: South Kesteven
- Shire county: Lincolnshire
- Region: East Midlands
- Country: England
- Sovereign state: United Kingdom
- Post town: PETERBOROUGH
- Postcode district: PE6
- Police: Lincolnshire
- Fire: Lincolnshire
- Ambulance: East Midlands
- UK Parliament: South Holland and The Deepings

Frognall is a small village in the South Kesteven district of Lincolnshire, England. It is situated just north-east of Deeping St James, to which it is almost conjoined, and on the Spalding Road, the B1525, which becomes the A1175 road on its route northwards from The Deepings to Spalding. It is within the civil and ecclesiastical parish of Deeping St James.

The village public houses used to be The Goat and the Rose Inn. The Rose Inn closed down in 2013.
