= The Deepings School =

Academy in Lincolnshire, England

Location
- Park Road; Deeping St. James, Lincolnshire, PE6 8NF; England; 52.67481°N 0.29689°W

Information
- Type: Academy
- Motto: "Dare To Excel"
- Established: 1958
- Department for Education URN: 137873 Tables
- Ofsted: Reports
- Headteacher: Kirstie Johnson
- Staff: 159
- Gender: Coeducational
- Age: 11 to 18
- Enrolment: 1,400+ pupils
- Houses: Welland , Priory & Guthlac
- Colour: Welland Priory Guthlac
- Website: http://www.deepingschool.org.uk/

The Deepings School is a coeducational secondary school and sixth form with academy status, located on Park Road in Deeping St James (near Peterborough) in Lincolnshire, England. As of April 2022, the school is attended by almost 1,500 pupils aged 11 to 18 taught by 90 teaching staff. It includes pupils from Stamford, Spalding, Langtoft, Baston, Bourne and the Deeping area.

== Construction ==
The site was on nine acres, on the main Spalding to Market Deeping road. It had steel and reinforced concrete, faced with Stamfordstone bricks from Williamson Cliff Ltd. Structural steelwork was from Robert Stevenson Structural of Norwich.

The classrooms were decorated in soft pastels, so as not to distract, with stronger shades in the circulation areas of corridors and stairways. In the domestic science room were facilities for cooking on gas, electricity and solid fuel. On the ground floor was a general science room, with island benches. The gym was 16 ft high, and had 2,800 sq ft, with mahogany herringbone sprung flooring.The assembly hall and dining room were combined, with the kitchens at the back of the hall; it was served around 200 meals a day. The practical handicraft room was joined to the main building with a concrete archway - it taught wood and forge work, metal turning and lathe operating.

== History ==
=== Secondary modern school ===
Deepings County Secondary Modern opened on Tuesday 9 September 1958 with 247 pupils. It was opened by Kesteven Education Authority, based in Sleaford. It cost £100,000, and it was hoped to have around 300 boys and girls. The headmaster was Mr E. Lamb. It was co-educational, which was Kesteven's policy. It took in those from Market Deeping, West Deeping, Deeping St James, Langtoft, Baston and Greatford. The school was named The Deepings Secondary Modern School in May 1957, in consultation with Deeping St James parish council.

=== Comprehensive ===
In August 1971 Kesteven Council decided to make the school comprehensive from September 1972, and an 11-18 age school for 1,200. It was given government approval in March 1972, but some Deeping St James children had previously taken and passed the eleven plus; of these, two were given places at Bourne Grammar School.

It became a comprehensive school from September 1972 with around 450 pupils. The Design Centre started construction in July 1973, to be completed by March 1974 and open by September 1974; it was a two-storey building, with two science laboratories and a staffroom, in preparation for a comprehensive intake.

The headteacher from Easter 1972, 44-year-old John Sweet, lived in Uffington; he had taken over from Mr G. Thomas, and had been the deputy headteacher since 1964; John Sweet was previously head of English at South Molton County Secondary School in Devon, and was from South Wales. He replaced Mr G. Thomas.

John Sweet died on 2 October 1974 in a car accident at North Rauceby crossroads, travelling to Brant Broughton. He lived at 'Little Spinney'. The van driver, working for Lindisposables Ltd, was 25 year old Robert Woods, of 149 Parthian Avenue in Wyberton, and was taken to Grantham Hospital. The inquest into the accident was held at Rauceby Hospital on 3 October. Mr Sweet was identified by Jeffrey Coulthurst, of Ancaster, the local director of education. A large picture of both crashed vehicles adorned the front page of the 'Sleaford Standard', with the headline 'Teacher killed' and also the 'Stamford Mercury'. Mr Sweet had had an accident at North Rauceby crossroads before, in 1966, when living at 106 Eastgate in Deeping St James, being fined £15 at Sleaford magistrates in July 1966 for careless driving. The accident in 1966 was identical to that in 1974, from descriptions of witnesses. The pathologist, from Lincoln County Hospital, said that death was probably instantaneous, not helped by Mr Sweet not wearing a seatbelt.

The new headteacher from April 1975 was John Meredith; from 1964 he had been headteacher of a British military school in West Germany. Mr Meredith left in the summer of 1988, and the new headteacher was David Bryars, deputy head of Wickersley Comprehensive School, and a Maths teacher.

=== Academy ===
The school converted to academy status on 1 February 2012.

=== Buildings ===
Admissions rose to 360, with the addition of a rural science block, built away from the main building, to teach soil study and vegetable growing, and greenhouse cultivation.

In 1990 a new library and sixth form centre was built, opened in 1991. A language and mathematics block was built in 1997, and a drama studio in 1998.

On Monday 8 July 1991 at around 4am, two people, aged 16, who previously attended the school, deliberately set fire to the science block, destroying the office of the head of upper school. 18 firemen attended from Market Deeping, Bourne and Crowland. In February 1992 at Peterborough Court, Matthew Bolton received six months, and Lee Markey received a 200-hour community service order.

Birgitte, Duchess of Gloucester opened new the Maths building, Music suite and drama studio on Tuesday 27 April 1999, and later visited Holbeach Hospital. She planted a tree in memory in memory of Joe Watkins, with his parents David and Lorraine; he had collapsed in a Music lesson at 10.30am on Thursday 26 March 1998, and subsequently died. He was believed to have had a type of cardiac arrest. His funeral was on Friday 3 April 1998 at Deeping St James Priory church.

In 2005 a Business and Enterprise block was built. A new staff room was built, and in 2011 a new school reception, sixth-form facilities, and conference centre were completed. A new sixth form block was completed in 2013.

In 2015 a new science centre was built after the original science classrooms were knocked down. In 2020, a new block, designed to be a replacement Art and Design department after the previous Business and Enterprise block was knocked down, was constructed. When students returned to school following the first national lockdown, final-year secondary students were allocated this block to have all of their lessons in. In 2022, this was later changed to function as its intended purpose. In 2022, a new sports hall was erected after the Deepings Leisure Centre closed down.

=== Reports ===
The 2010 Ofsted report for the 2009 inspection rated the school as grade 1 "outstanding" overall. In 2013 the school also achieved grade 1 "outstanding" from Ofsted.

=== Staff ===
In 2011 school head teacher Chris Beckett became one of 100 UK teachers selected by the National College for Schools Leadership as a National Leader of Education. In 2016, Richard Lord took over as headteacher. He resigned in August 2022. In September 2022, Alun Ebeneezer, appointed as an interim headteacher by Anthem Trust, was appointed temporarily until December. In January 2023, Matthew Wattling was appointed by Anthem Trust, alongside Kirstie Johnson as the deputy headteacher. In April, Wattling became executive, and Johnson became headteacher.

== Curriculum ==
School teaching provision is in line with National Curriculum, and includes the humanities, sciences, mathematics, English language and literature, technology, communications and foreign languages. Subjects can be taken towards GCSE and A-level examinations.

== Notable alumni ==
- Jade Etherington, Paralympian downhill skier
- Jonathan Foyle, architectural broadcaster
- Johnathan Hoggard, BRDC British Formula 3 driver
- Julie Hollman, heptathlete
- Jake Jarman, gymnast
- Ajay Tegala, wildlife presenter and author
- Ben Wright, footballer
