= John Grundy Jr. =

English civil engineer (1719–1783)

John Grundy Jr. (1719–1783) was an English civil engineer, who worked on a number of drainage schemes, canal projects and dock works. He lived in Spalding, Lincolnshire, from 1739. Part of his legacy was his Report Books, seventeen volumes containing copies of his reports and other supporting documents from most of his projects, which in some cases are the only surviving records of major civil engineering projects. They were re-discovered in 1988.

== Life history ==
John Grundy was the son of John Grundy, Sr. and Elizabeth Dalton. His father taught mathematics and was a land surveyor, who later became a civil engineer. John was born in the Leicestershire village of Congerstone, where he was baptised on 1 July 1719. The family moved to Spalding in south Lincolnshire in 1739, after his father became engineer for the drainage works at Deeping Fen. He joined the Gentlemen's Society in December 1739, and started work on his first known engineering project in the same year. This was for a sluice at Pinchbeck, where the Blue Gowt Drain joined the River Glen. His father probably supervised the project, and the two engineers worked on plans for improvements to the River Witham in 1743, which although they were not implemented at the time, formed the basis for subsequent work. He married Lydia Knipe in January 1743, and they had two daughters, Mary and Lydia, who survived into adulthood, and four other children who died as infants. His wife died in 1764, and he was married again in 1766, to Ann Maud, the widow of the vicar of St. Neots.

He remained based in Spalding for the rest of his life, and died there on 15 June 1783. In his will (dated 15 January), he ensured that his widow was well provided for, and left £1,000 to each of four grandchildren. He also bequeathed his books and manuscripts to Rev. J. G. Thompson, who was his eldest grandson and later became the vicar of the parish of Belton, near Grantham.

== Engineering works ==
Grundy was involved with major projects at Grimsthorpe between 1746 and 1752 which included an earth dam to create an artificial lake, and returned there intermittently over the next 20 years. Between 1748 and 1764, he was employed as engineer for Deeping Fen, which included maintenance of the River Welland. During this time, he also took on consulting work and gained a good reputation for this. In 1762 he became the collector of the Land Tax in Spalding district, which although it only occupied him for a few weeks each year, earned him more money than his salary from Deeping Fen. He resigned the Deeping Fen position in 1764, but was retained as a consultant.

His next projects included the Holderness drainage scheme, planning and supervision of the Louth Navigation which opened in 1770, the Adlingfleet drainage scheme, the Driffield Navigation, which also opened in 1770, the Laneham drainage scheme, and the Weighton drainage and navigation scheme, completed in 1775. He continued to act as consultant for Deeping Fen during this time, and also oversaw the construction of the first of the docks at Hull, the largest in England when it was completed in 1778.

After 1775, he was much less active in the civil engineering field, although he continued to produce reports when asked. His biggest achievement in this period was the production of his Report Books, running to 12 volumes and 4,000 pages, with details of all his projects, except the works for Deeping Fen.

=== Details ===
The Act to authorise the Holderness Drainage scheme was passed at around the time that Grundy's wife of 21 years had died. He wrote a personal letter to his friend, the engineer John Smeaton, expressing his sadness. Less than two months later, both men visited the site on 4 July 1764, and produced a report ten days later. Later, Grundy sent the working drawings for the terminal sluice into the Humber to Smeaton, who made some suggestions and drew up a bill of materials. Grundy then acted as engineer for the project, which included 17 miles (27 km) of barrier bank to protect the land to the east of the River Hull from flooding by the river. John Hoggard oversaw the construction of the bank, while Joseph Page acted as resident engineer for the construction of the sluice and drains, and Charles Tate acted as land surveyor. Grundy made several visits to check progress, until the main drains and sluice were completed in October 1767, although work continued on the bank and minor drains until 1772, under Hoggard's supervision.

The Laneham Drainage scheme covered an area of some 10 square miles (26 km^{2}) between Laneham and West Burton in Nottinghamshire on the western bank of the River Trent. Grundy was approached in December 1768 by a group of landowners, and produced his first plans in February 1769. They included a catchwater drain running along the western edge of the region to route several streams to a sluice on the Trent, a 7-mile (11 km) floodbank to prevent inundation by the river, and a Mother Drain with side drains to route rainwater to another sluice. He then produced detailed plans, which formed the basis for an Act of Parliament, and stayed in London during March and April 1769 to ensure the bill was passed. He acted as engineer for the Drainage Commissioners who had been appointed by the Act, and the scheme was finished in May 1772, on time and at a cost of £15,000. One change to the original scheme was his decision to add a drainage mill at Sturton, to lift water from the Mother Drain into the Trent. He made seven or more site visits during the course of the contract.

== Legacy ==
When he died, Grundy left his report books and copies of all his subsequent reports to his grandson. They were bought by Sir Joseph Banks, who was president of the Royal Society, in 1793, and the loose reports were bound into a further five volumes. The Banks family retained the books until 1918, when they were sold at auction. Nothing more was heard of them until 1955, when volume 2 was obtained by the Institution of Civil Engineers from a book dealer in London. Subsequently, the remaining 16 volumes were discovered in the library at the University of Leeds, where they had been since 1930. Lord Brotherton had given them to the university as part of a large bequest, and they were found in 1988. In addition to Grundy's reports, the volumes contain carefully drawn diagrams and plans, together with copies of estimates, minutes of meetings, and other details of his schemes. Volume 2 covers his work at Grimsthorpe, volume 4 covers work on the River Dee and volumes 10 and 11 give the details of the Laneham drainage scheme. These volumes are particularly important because there are few other records of these projects.
