= John Grundy Sr. =

John Grundy, Sr. (c.1696 – 1748) was a teacher of mathematics, a land surveyor, and later a civil engineer. Grundy lived in Congerstone, Leicestershire, England for the first forty years of his life; he later moved to Spalding in Lincolnshire. He was one of the first engineers to apply mathematical principles to the problems of land drainage. His son, John Grundy Jr., was also a civil engineer.

== Life history ==
John Grundy was the son of Benjamin and Mary Grundy. He was born in the village of Bilstone, probably in 1696, but resided in the nearby village of Congerstone for most of his early life. He married Elizabeth Dalton some time before 1719, for their first son, John Grundy Jr., was baptised in the church at Congerstone on 1 July of that year. He became well known as a land surveyor, and taught mathematics to private pupils, advertising his skills in Market Bosworth, Derby and Leicester. He visited Spalding in 1731, to do some surveying for the Duke of Buccleuch, where he noticed the work being undertaken by John Perry on the River Welland. He became convinced that "mathematical and philosophical principles" could be applied to the proper drainage of low-lying ground. He joined the Gentlemen's Society at Spalding in 1731, and presented them with a map of Spalding in 1732.

Over the next six years, he made several trips to the Spalding area and Deeping Fen to work on drainage projects; he moved his family to Spalding in 1738. He had trained his son well, for he undertook his first project at Pinchbeck sluice in 1739, and the two of them worked jointly on a survey of the River Witham from Lincoln to Boston, and plans for drainage of the fens bordering the river. He died at the age of 52, on 30 December 1748 at Spalding, but was buried in Congerstone. His son, who went on to become one of the leading English civil engineers of the eighteenth century, erected a memorial in the church building.

In memory of John Grundy, late of Spalding, in Lincolnshire, who without the advantage of a liberal education had gained by his industry a competent knowledge in several of the learned sciences and lived by all ingenious honest men deservedly beloved and died by all such truly regretted.

== Surveying ==
Grundy used a number of devices to enable him to carry out surveys, including a theodolite, a circumferentor, Beighton's improved plane table, and a Gunter's chain. When he undertook work for the Duke of Buccleugh in 1731, surveying his south Lincolnshire estates, he used the opportunity to study banks, drains, sluices and outfalls. The contract lasted for six months, and it was during this time that his ideas about applying mathematical principles developed. In 1733, he worked for the Commissioners of Sewers, surveying the parish of Moulton, near Spalding, and suggesting ways in which its drainage could be improved. To assist him, he obtained a spirit level with telescopic sights from Jonathan Sisson, who was the best instrument maker at the time. With it, he was able to achieve an accuracy better than 1 inch per mile (15 mm per km). He demonstrated its use to Henry Beighton, a Fellow of the Royal Society, in 1734, who was convinced that Grundy's methods for obtaining such accuracy were correct.

== Drainage ==
By 1734, Grundy had done enough research to publish a paper on the problem of flow in an open channel. He considered the movement of a single drop of water along a drain which was 4 miles (6.4 km) long, and dropped 12 inches (30 cm) over that distance. Treating it in a similar way to free fall on an inclined plane, he calculated that the drop would take 1 hour and 28 minutes to cover the distance, and would thus travel at about 4 feet (1.2 m) per second. He understood that this calculation ignored the effect of fluid friction, and used field observations to show that the actual speed was less than half of his theoretical value. He also tackled the science of flow through a sluice, and insisted that draining of fenland could only be achieved by accurate mapping, correct determination of levels, and detailed observations on the ground. His conclusions met with the approval of John Theophilus Desaguliers, another Fellow of the Royal Society, who advocated the application of science to engineering problems, and who wrote papers on Experimental Philosophy.

In 1735, Grundy went to see the River Dee, where Nathaniel Kinderley was working on a new ship canal through Chester. Although he thought that there were some aspects which could be better, he was upset by a paper published by Thomas Badeslade, which was extremely critical of it, and also of the work he was doing at Deeping Fen. A series of published exchanges took place in early 1736. Grundy took the view that making channels narrow and deep was important, since it increased the speed at which the water moved, and therefore its scouring action. Baseslade advocated allowing the maximum volume of water to move up and down a tidal river, and therefore opposed sluices, new cuts and the enclosing of salt marshes. Although the debate continued long after Grundy's death, he again pioneered the use of scientific principles, using works such as Castelli's Mensuration of Running Water to support his case.

== Projects ==
Following his work for the Duke of Baccleuch, he was asked to survey the parish of Moulton in 1733. The request came from the Commissioners of Sewers, and the survey was to include plans for improving the drainage of the parish lands. It is unclear whether the plans were implemented, but in the following year, he was surveying 30,000 acres (120 km^{2}) of fenland to the west of Spalding, at the request of the Adventurers of Deeping Fen. He produced a map of 22 miles (35 km) of the River Welland, and proposed the construction of a reservoir and sluice at the junction of the River Glen and the Welland, which would be used to scour the river below that point. The following year, he surveyed Vernatt's Drain, the main drainage channel of Deeping Fen. No action was taken immediately, but in 1737, the Adventurers decided to proceed. Working with Humphrey Smith, Grundy revised his proposals somewhat, and they formed the basis for an enabling Act of Parliament obtained in 1737. Although Grundy initially worked under Smith, soon both men were directing separate parts of the works. By 1742, the project was completed. The 12-mile (19 km) Deeping Bank flood bank had been repaired, the Welland and Glen had both been regraded, the banks of the Glen had been raised, a reservoir covering 8 acres (3.2 ha) and a sluice had been built at the mouth of the Glen to allow the channel to be scoured, the banks of the Glen had been raised and two drainage mills with scoop wheels had been constructed, one on Vernatt's Drain and the other on Hill's Drain.

Grundy continued to work on the Welland until 1746, making the channel through Spalding deeper and wider in 1744 and 1745, and carrying out other routine improvements, costing about £1,200 per year. He proposed that the outfall from Vernatt's Drain should be moved 2.5 miles (4.0 km) towards the sea, and although he did not see this actioned during his lifetime, his proposals were eventually implemented in 1774. During this period, he also made a survey of the River Witham, working with his son, and proposed a 7-mile (11 km) cut to improve navigation and flow on the river, but again did not see it implemented. In this case, the cost of £16,200 was too high, but the work was carried out in the 1760s.
