= Deeping St Nicholas =

Village in Lincolnshire, England

Coordinates: 52.7284°N 0.20205°W

Deeping Saint Nicholas
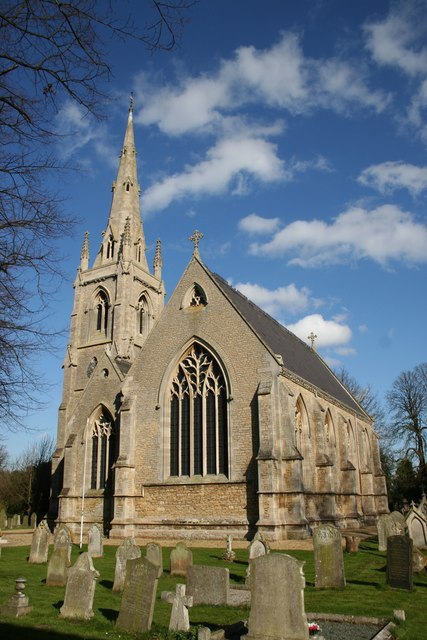
- Deeping St Nicholas church

- Location within Lincolnshire
- Population: 1,961 (2011)
- OS grid reference: TF215160
- Civil parish: Deeping St Nicholas
- District: South Holland
- Shire county: Lincolnshire
- Region: East Midlands
- Country: England
- Sovereign state: United Kingdom
- Post town: SPALDING
- Postcode district: PE11
- Dialling code: 01775
- Police: Lincolnshire
- Fire: Lincolnshire
- Ambulance: East Midlands
- UK Parliament: South Holland and The Deepings

Deeping St Nicholas is a village in Lincolnshire, England, on the A1175 road between The Deepings and Spalding. Unlike Market Deeping, which is in South Kesteven district, Deeping St Nicholas is in South Holland.

Deeping St Nicholas is also a South Holland civil parish which includes the small settlements of Tongue End and Hop Pole, and a number of outlying farms. Its population at the 2011 census was 1,961.

== Village ==
The village has a 19th-century stone church, the parish church of St Nicholas. The ecclesiastical parish is part of the Elloe West Deanery of the Diocese of Lincoln. There is no incumbent. It is part of the South Lincolnshire Circuit of the Methodist Church

The whole civil parish falls within the drainage area of the Welland and Deepings Internal Drainage Board.

At the Western end of the village is a level crossing for the Lincoln - Peterborough railway line, the site of the former Littleworth railway station. The goods shed there was used for agricultural produce, including transshipment from the narrow gauge potato railway that also crossed the road.

A Primary School opened on 2 January 1877 with a roll of 5 under a Mr Hanley. The current head teacher, Mr Tom Emery, oversees over 50 children.

In 2008, eight large wind turbines, the blades of which are 42 metres (137.8 ft) in length, were constructed on land to the north of the settlement.

== History ==
In the 1086 Domesday Book, the village is written as "Estdeping".

From John Marius Wilson's 1872 Imperial Gazetteer of England and Wales:

DEEPING FEN, a fen and a chapelry in Bourn district, Lincoln. The fen lies on the North Drove and the South Drove drains, between Market-Deeping and Spalding; and comprises upwards of 30,000 acres. About one-half consists of enclosed commons, included in parishes; and the rest is extra-parochial. The chapelry comprises the extra-parochial part; was constituted in 1846; bears the alternative name of Deeping-St. Nicholas; lies adjacent to North Drove railway station, and 5 miles WSW of Spalding; and has a post office, of the name of Deeping-St. Nicholas, under Spalding. Acres, 16, 290. Real property, £27, 681. Pop., 1, 180. Houses, 184. The living is a vicarage in the diocese of Lincoln. Value, £210. Patrons, the Trustees of the late W. Stevenson, Esq.. St. Nicholas's church was consecrated in 1846.

There is some evidence that before 1846, a building located in what is now the village centre was used as a school and also functioned as a chapel-of-ease. The new church replaced this older, provisional chapel-of-ease which historically fell under the ecclesiastical supervision of Sts. Mary & Nicolas church in Spalding - the vicar was Rev. Dr. William Moore, father of Canon Moore who succeeded him. When consecrated St. Nicholas's became a temporary chapel-of-ease in the district, called, in 1846, the "Ecclesiastical District of St. Nicholas Church in Deeping Fen". Other sources have suggested St. Nicholas's 'parent' church was Spalding St. John's, but this cannot have been the case: St Johns was itself not built until 1874/5, a generation later than Deeping St. Nicholas. In 1853 the chapelry was disbanded and the (ecclesiastical) parish became fully operational when the first resident incumbent perpetual curate, Revd. Lewis Edward Masters Barnwell, was inducted and installed (the first incumbent of all, from 1846 to 1853, was not resident: he was Reverend Charles B Bellairs, who was resident in Bedworth, Warwickshire.) With the installation of Edward Barnwell (the church registers clearly show this was the style the priest preferred to use) and the formation of the civil parish of Deeping St. Nicholas in 1856, the long title for the district slowly began to fade away and was not used after the 1860s. In 1849, according to the 1849 Clergy List, there was a curate, Reverend Charles Burton Reid but where he lived is uncertain as the newly-built vicarage was not completed until 1853. The church was built by Charles Kirk, an architect from Sleaford, in Decorated style common in older surrounding churches.

== Businesses ==
Most employment remains in agriculture. Other businesses are:

- D. Steele (farming)
- Vine House farm shop
- J. A. Watts (Mareham) Ltd (farming)
- J. Woodhead (farming)

== See also ==
- Saint Nicholas
