= Ian Strange (British artist) =

English ornithologist

Ian John Strange MBE (20 July 1934 – 30 September 2018), also known as the Bird Man, was a British artist, writer, ornithologist and conservationist who was associated with the Falkland Islands.

== Early years ==
Strange was born at Market Deeping in Lincolnshire. He attended school at Wolverhampton, subsequently studying at Wolverhampton College of Art, the Birmingham Botanical Gardens (United Kingdom) and the University of Birmingham. He then served with the Independent Parachute Brigade, following which he studied at the Essex College of Agriculture, also working on farms in the Essex fenlands. It was during this period that he met and married his first wife, Irene Hutley.

== Falkland Islands ==
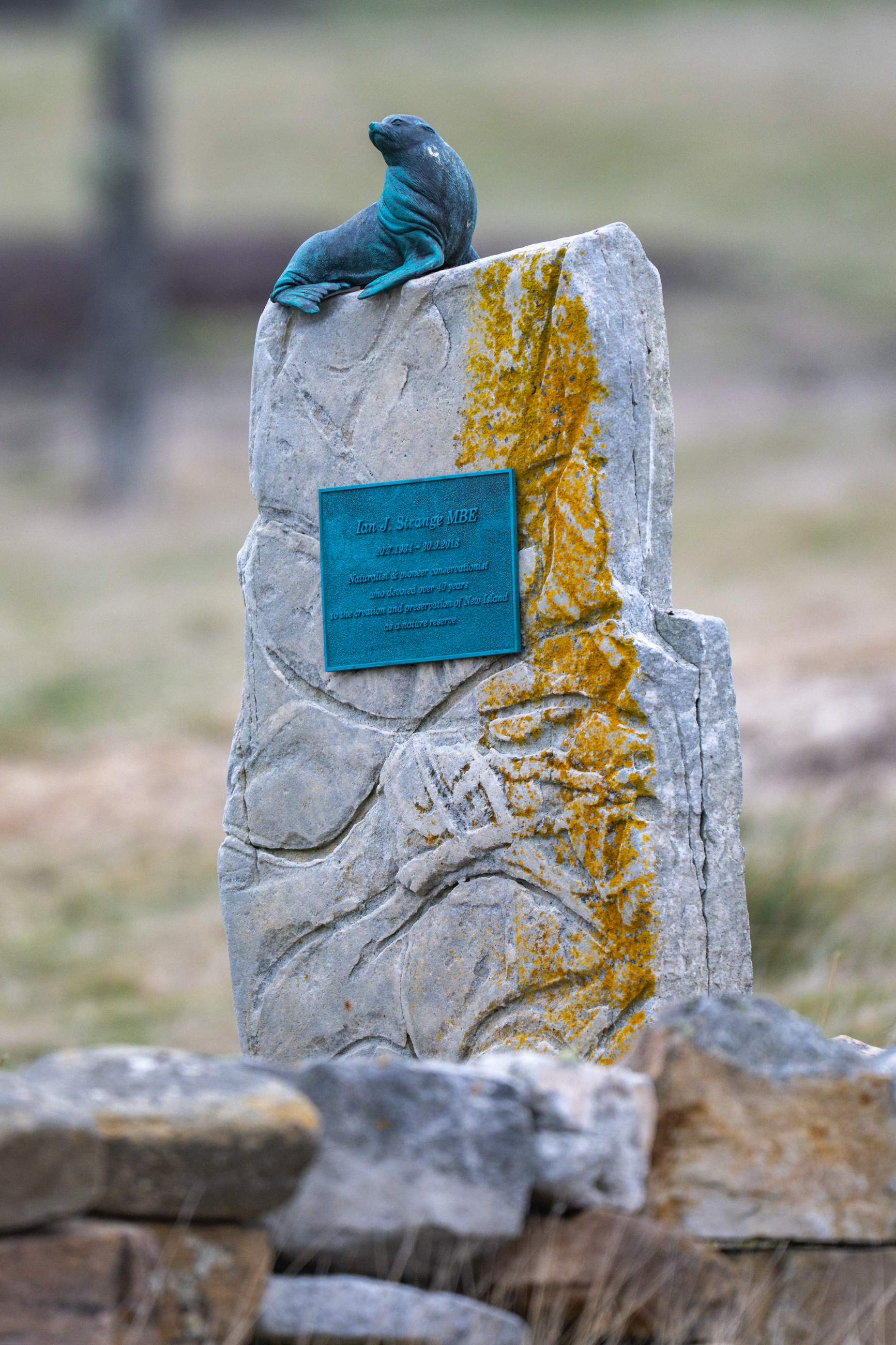
Memorial on New Island

In 1959 Strange accepted a position establishing and managing an experimental mink fur farm in the Falkland Islands for the Hudson's Bay Company. During the 1960s he became involved in conservation activities – promoting the establishment of wildlife reserves on several of the islands and surveying seal populations there. The unviability of fur farming led to Strange's return to the UK in 1967, but he returned to the Falklands in 1968 as a tour organiser with Lindblad Travel. In 1969 he married Ann Gisby and settled permanently in the Falklands, pursuing his attempts to obtain greater protection for the wildlife while making a living from writing articles and selling paintings. In 1971 he became an honorary advisor to the Falklands Government on wildlife and conservation. His first book, The Falkland Islands, was published in 1972. In the same year Strange was able, with additional sponsorship, to purchase New Island as a reserve and wildlife research centre.

== Publications ==
- 1972 – The Falkland Islands. David & Charles. ISBN 9780715355855 (second edition 1981, third edition 1983)
- 1976 – The Bird Man: An Autobiography. Gordon & Cremonesi: London. ISBN 0-86033-015-X
- 1981 – Penguin World. Putnam. ISBN 0-396-08000-6
- 1985 – The Falklands: South Atlantic Islands. Dodd Mead. ISBN 9780396086161
- 1987 – The Falkland Islands and their Natural History. David & Charles: Newton Abbot, Devon, UK. ISBN 0-715-38833-9
- 1990 – Collins Field Guide to the Wildlife of the Falkland Islands and South Georgia. HarperCollins. ISBN 9780002198394
- 1995 – The Striated Caracara Phalcoboenus australis in the Falkland Islands. Author.
- 2005 – Atmosphere – Landscapes of the Falkland Islands. (With Georgina Strange). Design in Nature. ISBN 0-9550708-0-5
