= Bilstone =

Village in Leicestershire, England

Coordinates: 52.6446°N 1.46524°W

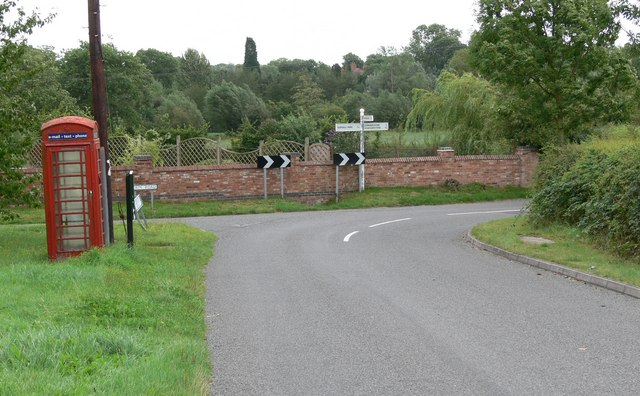
- Twycross Road, Bilstone

- Location within Leicestershire
- OS grid reference: SK362053
  - London: 95 mi (153 km) SE
- Civil parish: Shackerstone
- District: Hinckley and Bosworth
- Shire county: Leicestershire
- Region: East Midlands
- Country: England
- Sovereign state: United Kingdom
- Post town: NUNEATON
- Postcode district: CV13
- Dialling code: 01827
- Police: Leicestershire
- Fire: Leicestershire
- Ambulance: East Midlands
- UK Parliament: Hinckley and Bosworth

Bilstone is a small village and former civil parish, now in the parish of Shackerstone, in the Hinckley and Bosworth district of Leicestershire, England. It is approximately 12 miles (19 km) west from the county town and city of Leicester, and 2 miles (3.2 km) east from Twycross and the A444 road. In 1931 the parish had a population of 68.

The village's name means 'farm/settlement of Bildr' or 'farm/settlement on a corner or angle'.

A half mile to the south, on Gibbet Lane, is a gibbet post, dating from 1800. The post was used to hang the remains of John Massey, who murdered his wife in 1801. The post was half an hour away from the murder site. At the west of the village is a Grade II listed early 19th-century farmhouse. At the north of the village on Mill Lane is a disused 18th-century watermill, with adjoined 19th-century buildings. The mill was operational in the 1950s; today its machinery doesn't exist.

Bilstone is listed in the Domesday Book as in the Guthlaxton Hundred of Leicestershire, with two ploughlands, three households and three freemen. In 1066 Countess Godiva was Lord, she remaining as such in 1086, also becoming Tenant-in-chief to William I.

In 1870-1872 Bilston was a township in the parish of Norton Juxta Twycross with a population of 116 and 25 houses.

In 1866 Bilstone became a parish in its own right, on 1 April 1935 the parish was abolished and merged with Shackerstone.

John Grundy Sr., land surveyor and civil engineer, was born in Bilstone c. 1696.
