= Market Deeping Town Hall =

Municipal building in Market Deeping, Lincolnshire, England

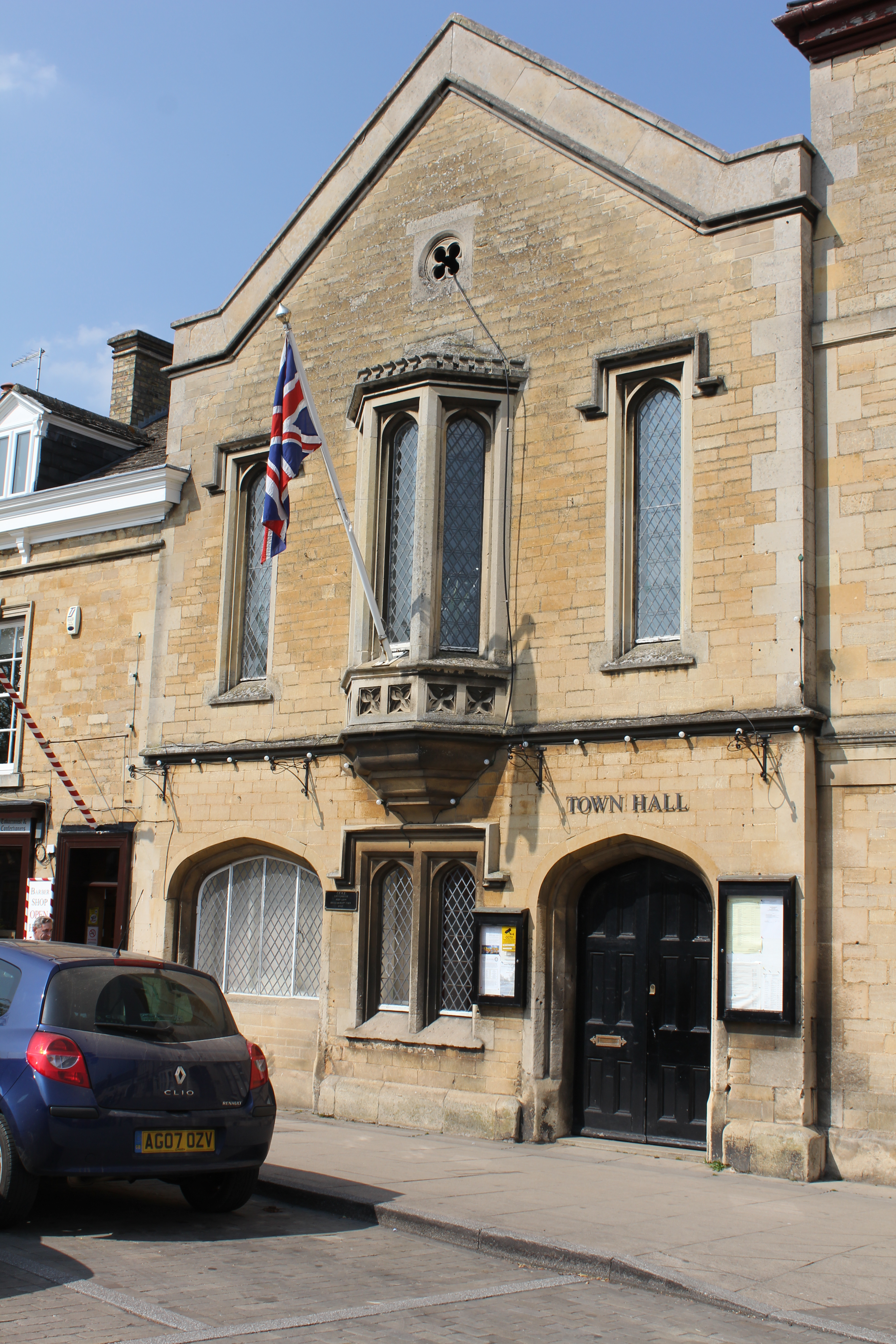
- Market Deeping Town Hall

- Shown in Lincolnshire
- 52.6755°N 0.3171°W
- Location: Market Place, Market Deeping

History
- Built: 1835

Site notes
- Architect: Thomas Pilkington
- Architectural style: Gothic Revival style

Listed Building – Grade II
- Official name: Town Hall
- Designated: 22 June 1987
- Reference no.: 1317350

Market Deeping Town Hall is a municipal structure in the Market Place, Market Deeping, Lincolnshire, England. The structure, which is the meeting place of Market Deeping Town Council, is a Grade II listed building.

== History ==
The building was commissioned to replace an earlier town hall of uncertain age at the west end of the Market Place. The new building was designed by Thomas Pilkington in the Gothic Revival style, built in limestone with ashlar dressings at a cost of £320 and was completed in 1835.

The design involved an asymmetrical main frontage with three bays facing onto the Market Place. On the ground floor, the right hand bay featured a Tudor style doorway while the left hand bay contained a wide round headed window and the centre bay contained a pair of mullioned windows; on the first floor there was a prominent central oriel window flanked by narrow single-light windows. There was a gable above with a quatrefoil in the centre. Internally, the principal rooms were a waiting room on the ground floor and some offices on the first floor. The building also originally had police cells in the basement.

In the 19th century, petty session hearings were held in the town hall every third Wednesday. In 1878, a reading room and an educational institute were installed in the building, which continued to serve as the meeting place for the civil parish of Market Deeping until, with local government re-organisation, it was transferred to the ownership of South Kesteven District Council in 1974. The newly-formed Market Deeping Town Council took a lease on the building from South Kesteven District Council in 1977, and started to use the building as its main meeting place.

In 2012 a plaque was attached to the front of the town hall, above the window in the left hand bay, to recognise the selection of Market Deeping as an Olympic Torch Town for the 2012 Summer Olympics. Also in 2012, South Kesteven District Council prepared an asset management plan which identified the building as being surplus to requirements. After finding that the building was also in need of extensive repairs, particularly to the roof, costing of £50,000, the district council sold it to the town council for a nominal sum in March 2020.
