= Deeping Gate =

Village in Cambridgeshire, England

Coordinates: 52.670546°N 0.299826°W

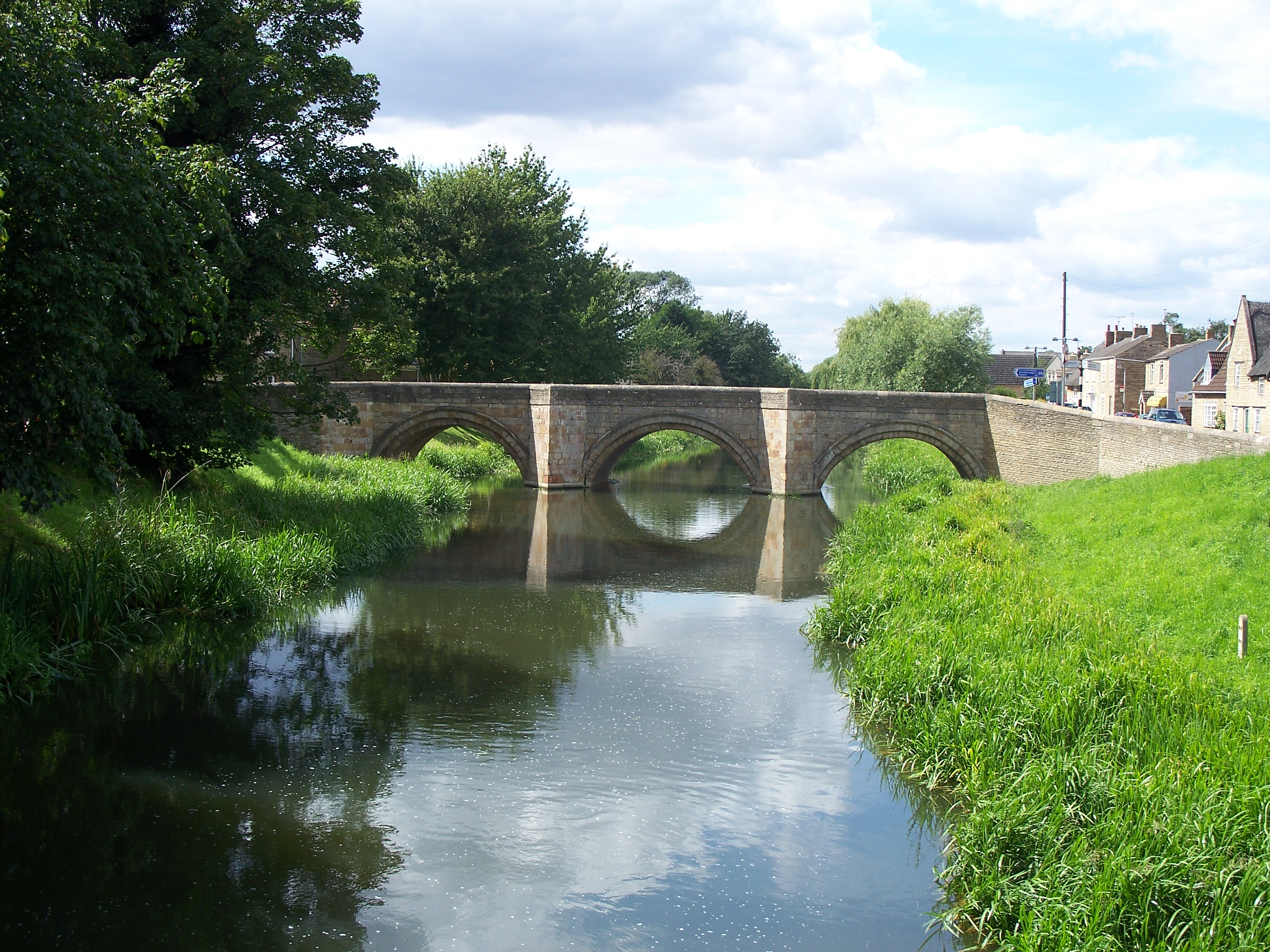
- The bridge connecting Deeping St. James and Deeping Gate

- Location within Cambridgeshire
- Population: 515 (2011 Census)
- Civil parish: Deeping Gate
- Unitary authority: Peterborough
- Ceremonial county: Cambridgeshire
- Region: East
- Country: England
- Sovereign state: United Kingdom
- Post town: Peterborough
- Postcode district: PE6
- Police: Cambridgeshire
- Fire: Cambridgeshire
- Ambulance: East of England
- UK Parliament: North West Cambridgeshire

Deeping Gate is a village and civil parish, lying on the River Welland in Cambridgeshire. Traditionally, the area was part of the Soke of Peterborough, geographically considered a part of Northamptonshire; it now falls within the City of Peterborough unitary authority area of Cambridgeshire. With a very small population, void of any major services, including a post office or even a chapel, the community depends on nearby Market Deeping, one and a quarter miles (2.0 km) north of the river in Lincolnshire, for economic and market services. The parish had a population of 258 males and 257 females according to the 2011 Census. Renaissance composer Robert Fayrfax (Fairfax) was a native of the village. Fairfax House, the most prominent and grand property in the village, was home to the Fairfax Family.

In the 1870s Wilson described Deeping Gate as:

a hamlet in Maxey parish, Northampton; at the boundary with Lincoln, 1 mile SE of Market-Deeping. Real property, £1, 867. Pop., 224. Houses, 47

St. Peter's, Maxey, the most northerly ecclesiastical parish in the Diocese of Peterborough, includes Deeping Gate. For local government purposes it forms part of Northborough ward, within North West Cambridgeshire parliamentary constituency. Deeping Gate falls within the drainage area of the Welland and Deepings Internal Drainage Board.

This time series shows the total population of the parish of Deeping Gate over the course of 130 years:

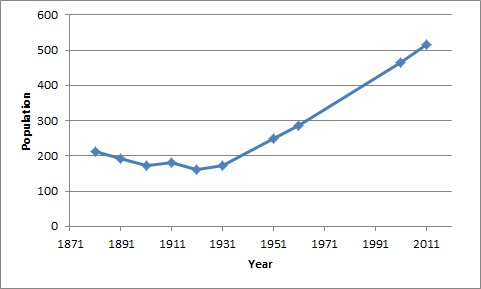
Deeping Gate population time series 1881-2011

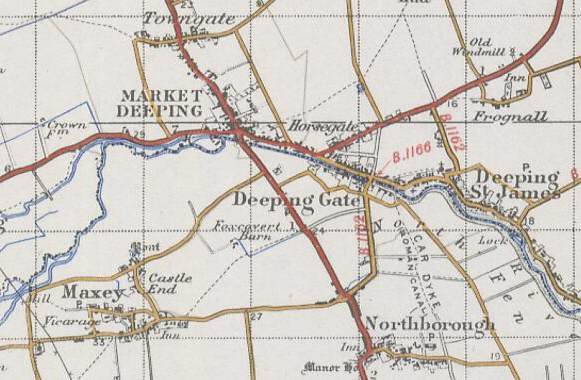
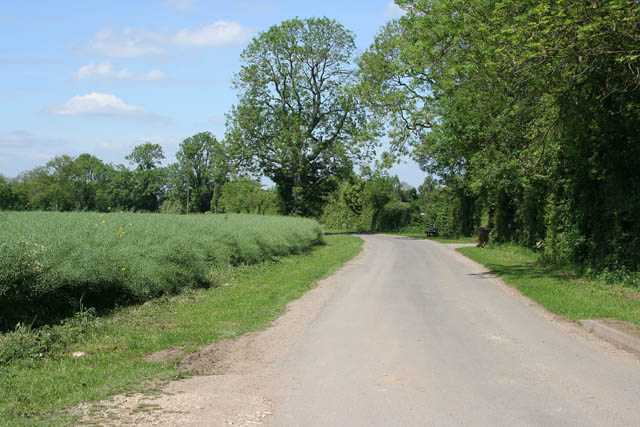

== See also ==
- The Deepings
