= The Deepings =

Series of settlements in eastern England

Coordinates: 52.67012°N 0.30076°W

Map showing the location of The Deepings within Lincolnshire

The Deepings (grid reference TF150094) are a series of settlements close to the River Welland near the borders of southern Lincolnshire and north western Cambridgeshire in eastern England. Peterborough is about 8 miles to the south, Spalding about 10 miles to the north east and Stamford about 8 miles to the west.

The area is very low-lying, and gave The Deepings their name (a Saxon name translatable as either 'deep places' or 'deep lands'). The villages are mentioned in the Domesday Book. Deeping Fen lies to the North, and the drainage of it was an important part of seventeenth and eighteenth century land reclamation. It is now the responsibility of the Welland and Deepings Internal Drainage Board.

The Deepings

== The Settlements ==
=== Lincolnshire ===
Within the South Kesteven District Council Area:

- Market Deeping — a market town and the largest of the Deepings settlements
- Deeping St James — a village and the second largest Deepings settlement. The civil parish of Deeping St James includes the villages of:
  - Frognall
  - Stowgate
- West Deeping

Within the South Holland District Council Area:

- Deeping St Nicholas
  - Hop Pole — a hamlet within the Deeping St Nicholas civil parish
- Tongue End

=== Cambridgeshire ===
- Deeping Gate — a village within the City of Peterborough

== History ==
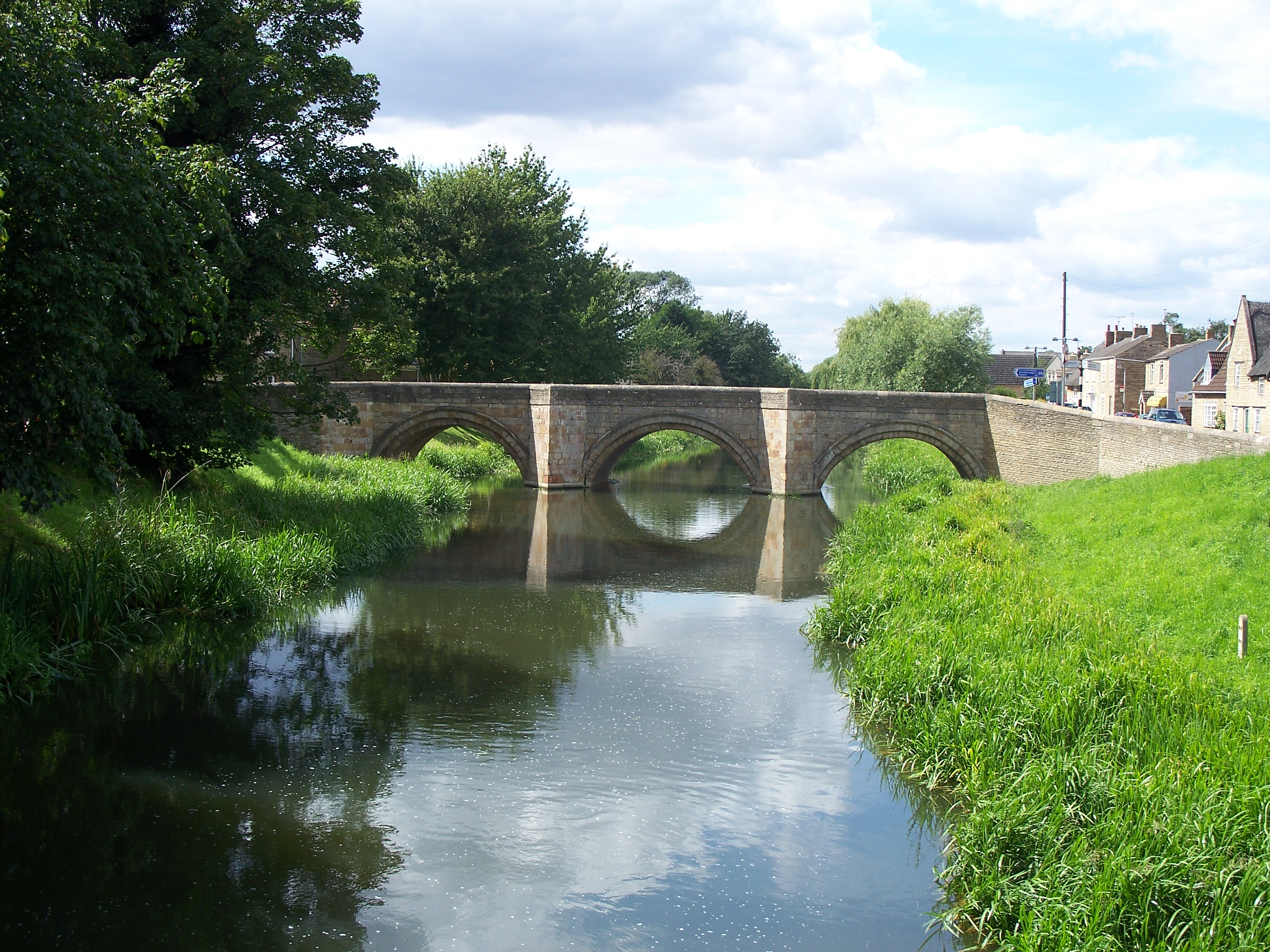
The old bridge over the River Welland connecting Deeping St James and Deeping Gate.

Drainage of the area dates back at least as far as the Romans, and the Car Dyke, but the capital involved always required a strong state, and rich men, to improve the land.

In William the Conqueror's reign Richard de Rulos who was the Lord and Owner of part of Deeping Fen "and was much addicted to good husbandry, such as tillage and breeding of cattle. took in a great part of the common fen adjacent and converted it into several, for meadows and pastures. He also made an Inclosure from the Chapel of St. Guthlac of all his lands up to the Cardyke, excluding the river Welland within a mighty bank; because almost every year his meadows lying near that stream were overflowed. upon this bank he erected tenements and cottages and in a short time made it a large town, whereunto he assigned gardens and arable fields, By thus embanking the river he reduced the low grounds, which before that time were deep lakes and impassable fens, (hence the name Deep-ing or Deep Meadow), into most fruitful fields and pastures; and the most humid and moorish parts to a garden of pleasure. Having by this good husbandry brought the soil to that fertile condition, he converted the chapel of St Guthlac into a church, the place now being called Market Deeping, By the like means of banking and draining he also made a village dedicated to St. James in the very pan of Pudlington, and by much labour and charge reduced it into fields, meadows, and pasture, which is now called Deeping St. James

-- W.H. Wheeler, quoting William Dugdale. Dugdale drew heavily on William Camden's Brittania which tells the same story in nearly the same words.

== See also ==
- Deeping St James Priory
- Saint Guthlac's church, Market Deeping
