= St Guthlac's Church, Market Deeping =

Church in Lincolnshire, England

St Guthlac's Church
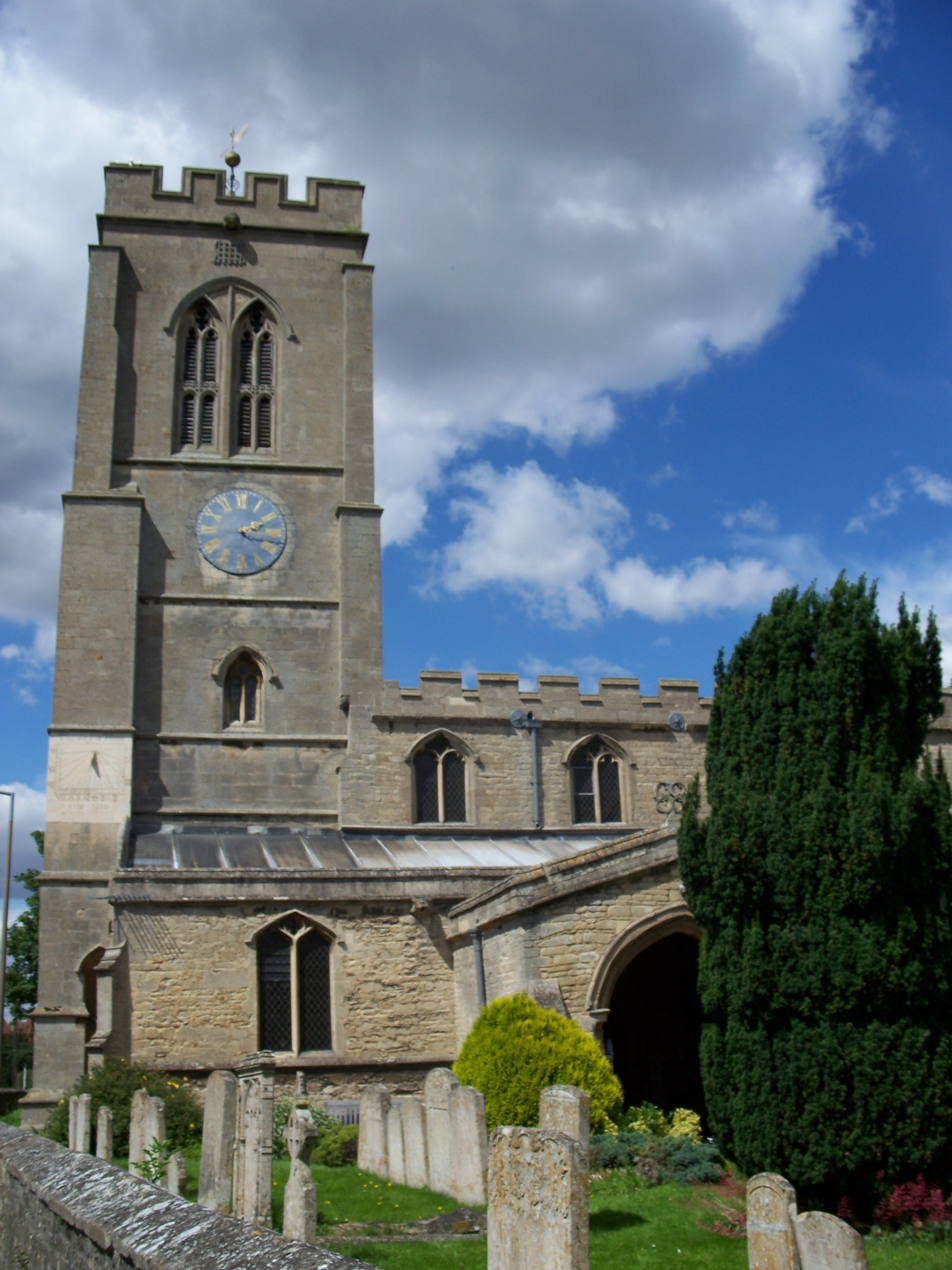
- The bell tower from the south
- St Guthlac's Church
- 52°40′43″N 0°19′12″W
- Denomination: Church of England
- Website: www.stguthlacs.org.uk

History
- Dedication: Saint Guthlac

Administration
- Province: Canterbury
- Diocese: Lincoln

Clergy
- Rector: Rev'd Georgina Holding

Saint Guthlac's Church, Market Deeping is a parish church of the Church of England in Market Deeping, Lincolnshire, England.

== Background ==
The largely 15th-century church of St Guthlac is the only church in Market Deeping, and is part of the Church of England. The church is in the Diocese of Lincoln in the Deanery of Elloe West. St Guthlac's is a member of the Deepings Churches Together, a local organisation of churches within The Deepings, and a member of the St Guthlac fellowship. As of 2020 the rector is the Reverend Georgina Holding.

== Architecture ==
On the south face of the tower is a limestone sundial inscribed with "The day is thine", with a similar sundial on the north face which bears the words "The Night cometh". The nave is supported on the south aisle by Norman arches, whereas those on the north aisle are later Gothic period. The church organ is Victorian. The stained glass windows in the chancel depict scenes of the life of the St Guthlac, including one in which he is seen sailing through what is now the fens to establish a monastery, now Crowland Abbey.

== Organ ==
The church has a two manual pipe organ.National Pipe Organ Register.
