= Deeping St James Priory =

Priory in Deeping St James, Lincolnshire, England

Coordinates: 52.6717°N 0.2895°W

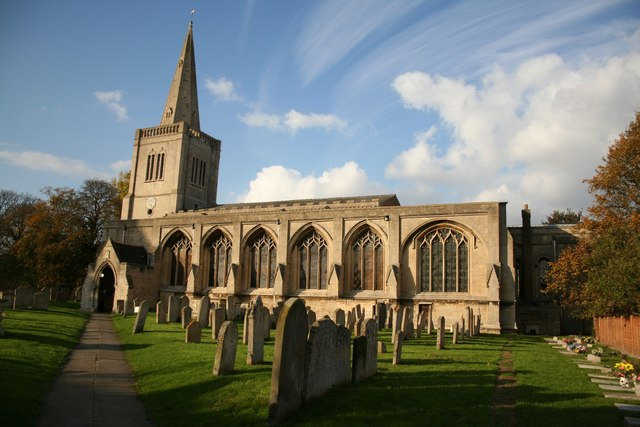
Priory church of Deeping St James

Deeping St James Priory was a priory in Deeping St James, Lincolnshire, England. It was a dependency of Thorney Abbey.

== History ==
In 1139 Baldwin Fitz Gilbert established the Benedictine Priory of Saint James at Deeping as a cell of Thorney Abbey. The endowment of the priory consisted of the two churches of Deeping, St James and St Guthlac. While Thorney Abbey appointed the priest and supervised the administration of the Priory, the church was still the parish church of the local villagers.

The cell was dissolved at the surrender of Thorney in 1539. The priory church remains as the Church of England parish church of Deeping St James and is a Grade I listed building.

On the south-east side of the churchyard was the priory tithe barn, which measured 90 feet by 20 feet, 6 inches internally. It has variously been described as 13th century, late 15th century, or 17th century. It was demolished in 1963.

There are no surface indications or remains of the monastic house.

The church contained an organ dating from 1902 by Abbot & Smith; a specification can be found on the National Pipe Organ Register.

== Priors of Deeping ==
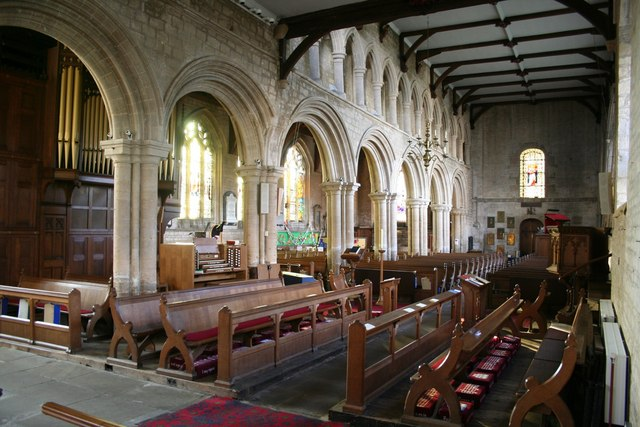
Priory church nave arcade

The list of known names is incomplete:

- Jocelyn, occurs in the 12th century
- James Nassington, occurs 1299
- Thomas of Gosberkirk, occurs from 1329 to 1347
- John de Charteris, occurs 1358 and 1365
- William Lee, last prior.
