= Market Deeping =

Town in Lincolnshire, England

Coordinates: 52.6776°N 0.3173°W

- Town
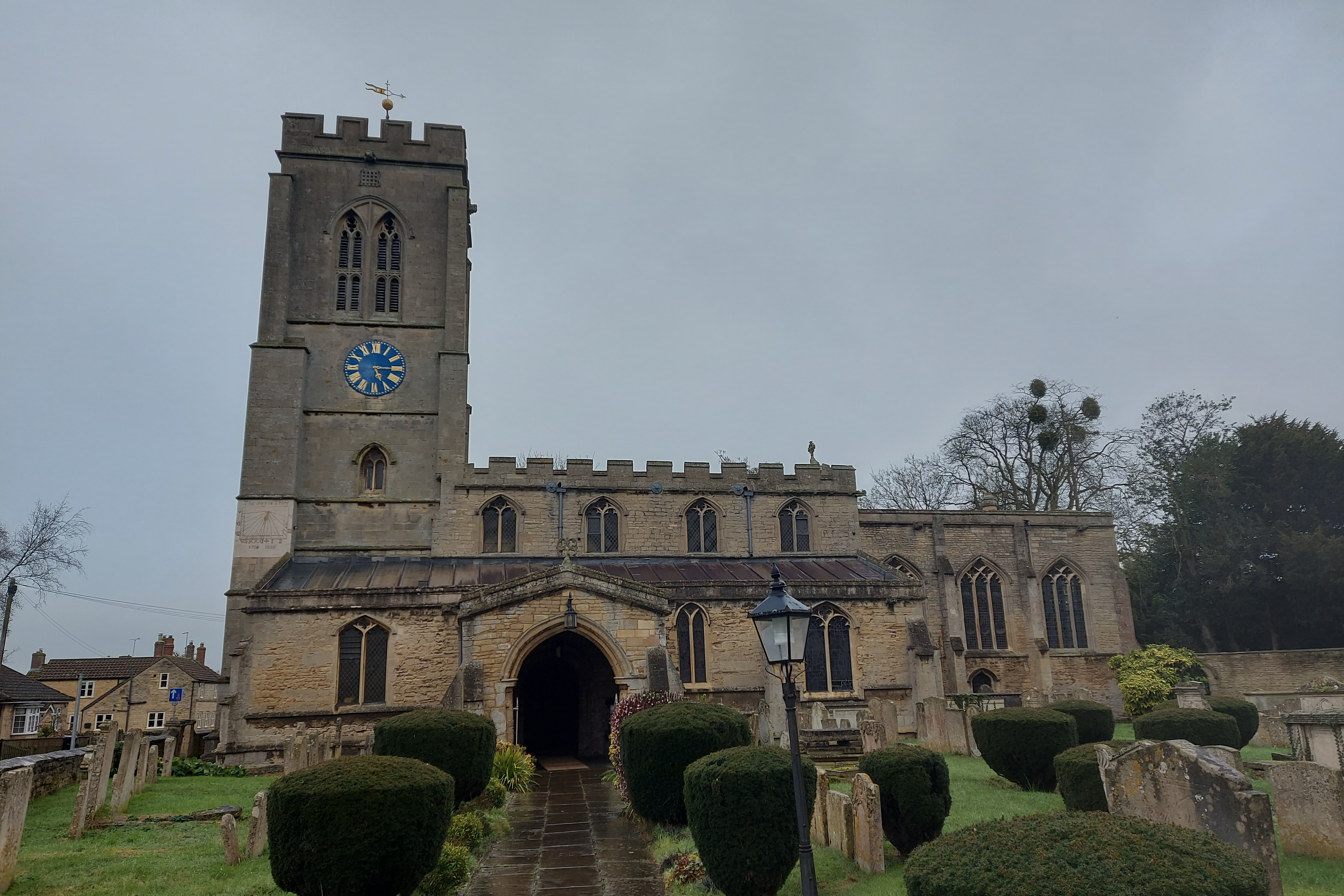
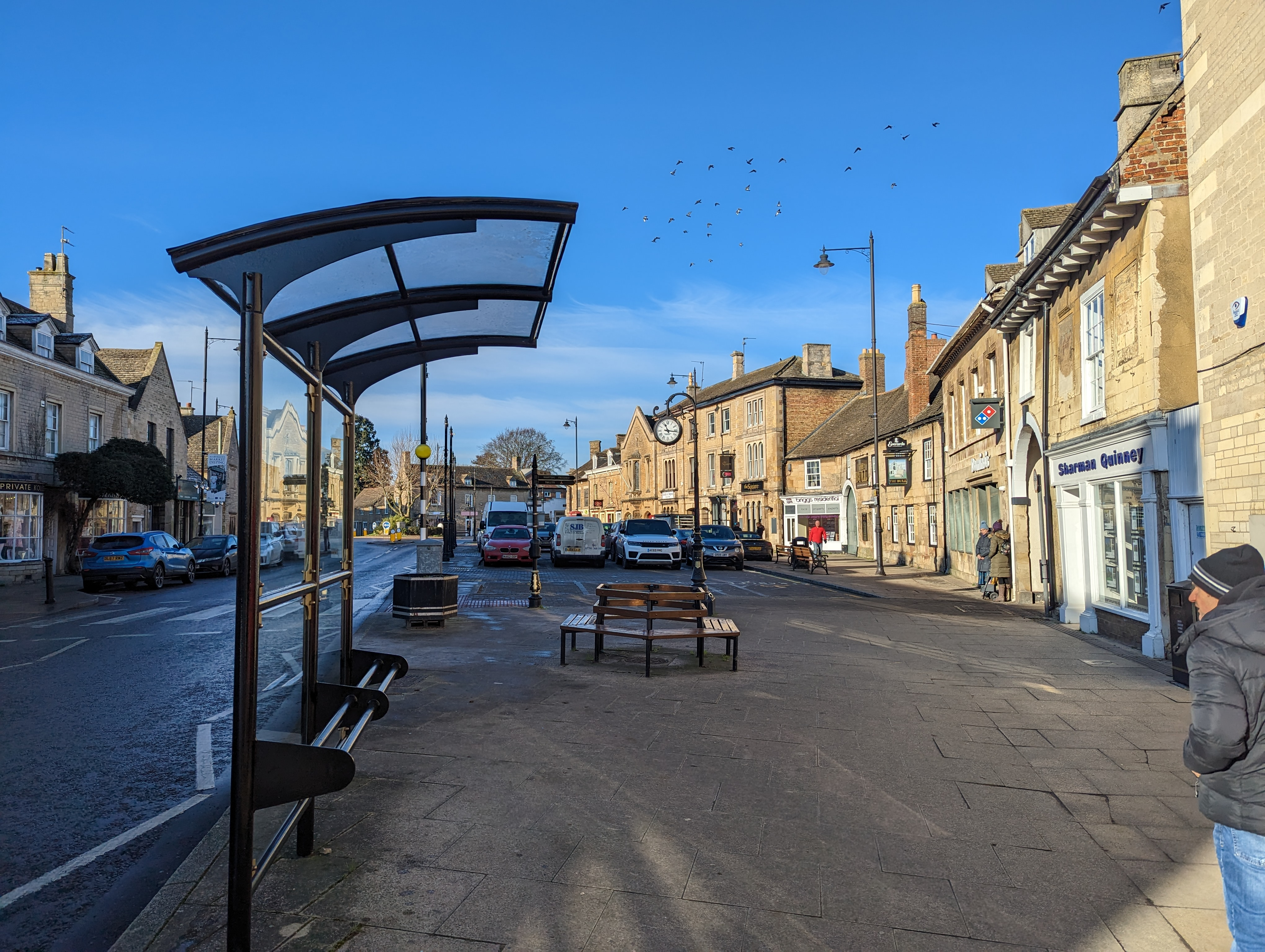
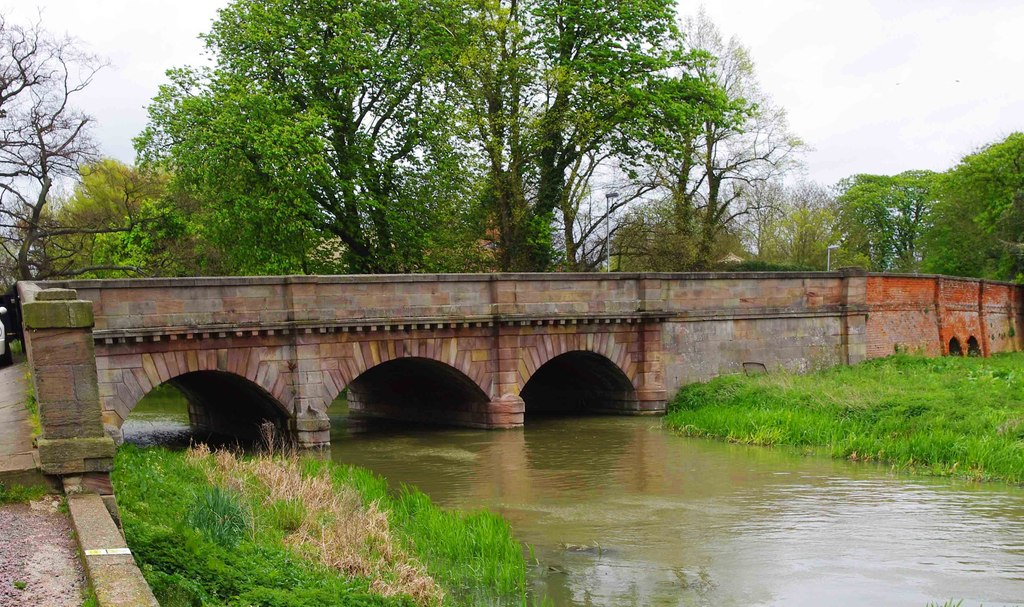
- St Guthlac's Church Market Place River Welland

- Location within Lincolnshire
- Population: 6,008 (2011)
- OS grid reference: TF137102
  - London: 80 mi (130 km) S
- Civil parish: Market Deeping
- District: South Kesteven
- Shire county: Lincolnshire
- Region: East Midlands
- Country: England
- Sovereign state: United Kingdom
- Post town: PETERBOROUGH
- Postcode district: PE6
- Dialling code: 01778
- Police: Lincolnshire
- Fire: Lincolnshire
- Ambulance: East Midlands
- UK Parliament: South Holland and The Deepings

Market Deeping is a market town and civil parish in the South Kesteven district of Lincolnshire, England, on the north bank of the River Welland and the A15 road. The population of the town at the 2011 census was 6,008.

== History ==
The name Deeping derives from the Old English dēoping meaning 'deep place'. The town's market has been held since at least 1220.

The town developed around the commercial use of the River Welland, which today is backed onto by many pleasant Georgian stone buildings. The town is part of a group of Lincolnshire villages and hamlets, collectively called the Deepings, which include Deeping Gate, West Deeping, Deeping St James and Langtoft.

The Grade II listed limestone Packhorse Bridge was built in 1651, just after the English Civil War. The bridge was narrow, allowing for single file traffic only. Refuge ledges were built into either side of the bridge for pedestrian safety. A marker on the side of the bridge indicates the level of the water during the floods of 1880. The river was once of great commercial importance, navigable as far as Stamford.

Today the river trade has all but gone and the navigation greatly diminished - its head now terminating at the derelict lock at Deeping St James, just upstream of the Packhorse Bridge. Although no longer navigable for commercial traffic, the river provides pleasant scenic walks. Access to the town from the south nowadays is via a later and wider road bridge with two lanes for traffic and pavements on either side.

The £10 million four-mile-long (6.4 km) A15 and A16 bypass opened in July 1998, which incorporates a 2.5-mile (4.0 km) stretch of single and dual carriageway. The A16 has now moved to the former A1073 from Crowland to Spalding, and the bypass became the A1175 in October 2011.

== Governance ==
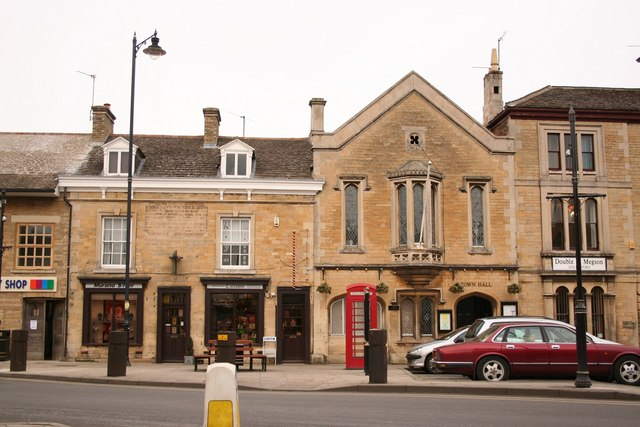
Market Deeping Town Hall

The town is part of the South Holland and The Deepings Parliamentary Constituency but is also part of South Kesteven District. It sends three district councillors to SKDC which is based in Grantham. It currently has one Conservative and two Independents although since 1983 it has mostly returned Liberals and Independents. The first Green Party candidate stood in 2007 and was runner-up.

The town and some of the surrounding villages including West Deeping and Tallington form the new Deepings West and Rural division of Lincolnshire County Council which will elects one councillor (currently a Conservative since the May 2017 elections).

The town elects 13 councillors to form Market Deeping Town Council which is based at Market Deeping Town Hall.

== Geography ==
Market Deeping, with 2,462 households, is the largest of The Deepings followed by the large village Deeping St James. The River Welland forms the border with the Peterborough unitary authority area. It is the seventh-lowest-lying town in terms of height above sea level in England. The town is known for its stone buildings dating back to the 17th century, its largely 15th-century church dedicated to St. Guthlac and the remains of a market cross.

== Economy ==
On 1 February 1994 Prince Edward, Duke of Kent visited Park Air Electronics on the Northfields Industrial Estate, accompanied by Sir Henry Nevile, then the Lord Lieutenant of Lincolnshire. This company is now called Park Air Systems, owned by Northrop Grumman. Best of British magazine is based on Market Gate. In July 2010 the Eventus Business Centre was opened on the Northfields Industrial Estate, a purpose-built business centre financed through Lincolnshire County Council.

== Community ==
=== Education ===
The main secondary school is the Deepings School, in neighbouring Deeping St. James, an academy school with a comprehensive intake. It was built as the Deeping County Secondary Modern School in 1958, and became a comprehensive in the mid-1970s. The rest of South Kesteven operates a selective education system. Market Deeping's two primary schools are William Hildyard Church Of England Primary And Nursery School and Market Deeping Community Primary School.

=== Religion ===
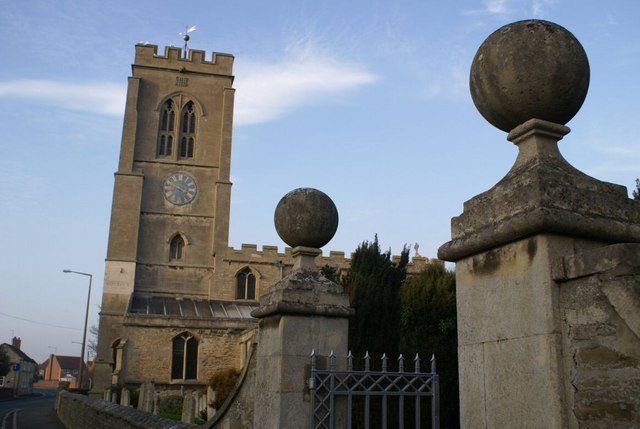
Saint Guthlac's Church

The parish of Market Deeping falls within the Diocese of Lincoln and the town's Anglican church is dedicated to St Guthlac. It is situated on Church Street. It is the only church in the town although there are five in neighbouring Deeping St James namely: the Catholic Church of St Mary and Guthlac; Deepings Methodist Church, Deeping Baptist Church and the Open Door Baptist Church of the Deepings.

=== Amenities ===
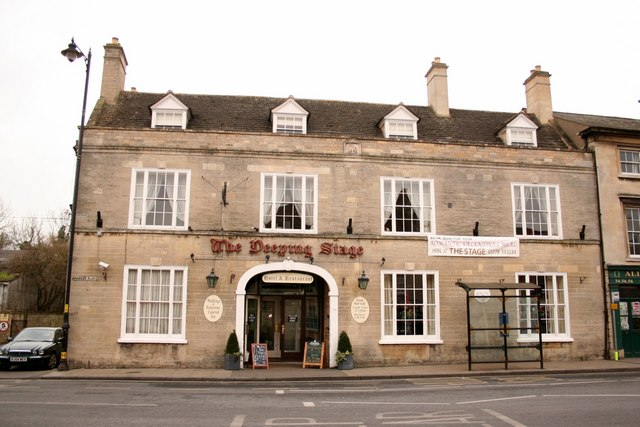
The Deeping Stage

The Deeping Stage Hotel is in Market Place is by the River Welland. Other Deeping pubs include The Vine, The White Horse, The Bull and The Square.

The town has two significant fish and chip shops: The Boundary, which won the East of England Fish and Chip Shop of the Year award in 2007, "one of the top ten in the country;" and Linford's which was one of seven runners-up in the National Fish and Chip Awards in 2012.

Market Deeping's food and grocery outlets include supermarkets, pizza, Italian, Thai, British, Nepalese, Indian and American restaurants.

=== Media ===
Market Deeping is covered by the Sandy Heath transmitter which broadcasts BBC local news service Look East and ITV Anglia, or the Belmont transmitter for BBC Look North (East Yorkshire and Lincolnshire) and ITV Calendar (Yorkshire and Lincolnshire). There is also reception from the Waltham transmitter which broadcasts BBC East Midlands Today and ITV Central.

Local radio is provided by BBC Radio Cambridgeshire and BBC Radio Lincolnshire. The area is one of the few in Lincolnshire to be covered by a local DAB multiplex, NOW Peterborough.

Newspapers covering Market Deeping, based in larger towns nearby, are the Stamford Mercury, the Lincolnshire Free Press and the Peterborough Telegraph. There is also several local publications including the monthly I'd rather be in Deeping magazine and the weekly Deepings Advertiser.

=== Sport ===
Market Deeping's football team is Deeping Rangers F.C., formed in 1964. The local rugby union club is Deepings Rugby Union F.C.; its 1st XV were Champions of Midlands 6 East (South) in 2007. The girls' football team is the Deeping Diamonds F.C. There is also Deepings Swimming Club, Woody Heights skate park in nearby Deeping St James, and a BMX track adjacent to the remains of the original 1980s track, located on the John Eve Playing Field. The Bourne Deeping Hockey Club has recently been formed.

== Notable people ==
- Julie Hollman – heptathlon athlete
- Ian Strange – naturalist and writer on the Falkland Islands
- Ajay Tegala – wildlife presenter and author
