= Deeping St James =

Village in Lincolnshire, England

Coordinates: 52.6717°N 0.29955°W

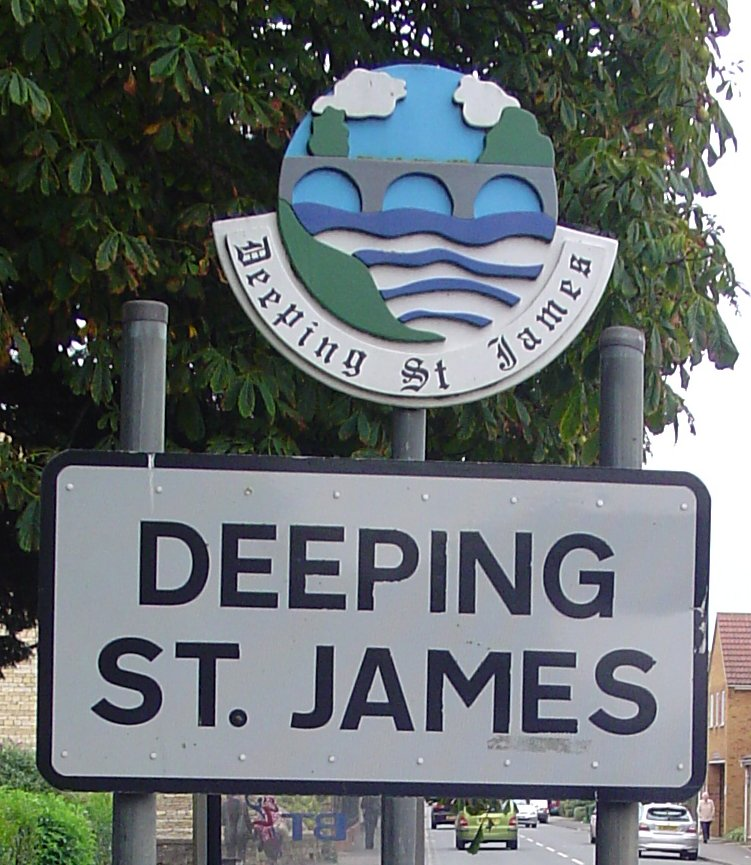
- Signpost in Deeping St James

- Location within Lincolnshire
- Population: 6,923
- OS grid reference: TF150095
  - London: 80 mi (130 km) S
- Civil parish: Deeping St James
- District: South Kesteven
- Shire county: Lincolnshire
- Region: East Midlands
- Country: England
- Sovereign state: United Kingdom
- Post town: PETERBOROUGH
- Postcode district: PE6
- Dialling code: 01778
- Police: Lincolnshire
- Fire: Lincolnshire
- Ambulance: East Midlands
- UK Parliament: South Holland and The Deepings

Deeping St James is a large village in the South Kesteven district of Lincolnshire, England. The population of the civil parish (including Frognall) was reported as 7,051 at the 2011 census.

== History ==
Based around a now lost 12th-century Benedictine Priory, destroyed during the Dissolution of the Monasteries, the Grade I listed Anglican church of St James is the largest church in The Deepings. It is a mixture of Norman, Early English and Perpendicular styles, with a tower and spire added in 1717. The stones from the priory were used to build various 17th-century buildings in the area.

The village also has an 18th-century village lock-up, constructed on the site and with the materials from a 15th-century wayside cross.

In the 17th century the manor was associated with the Wymondsold family of Welbeck Place, Putney, Surrey and East Lockinge, Berks.

St James Deeping railway station, built by the Great Northern Railway Company in 1848, was closed in 1964.

Although the separate cut for the Stamford Canal did not start until upstream of Market Deeping, Briggin's lock (or the Deeping High lock) was an important part of the Welland Navigation, and is still in place but is not navigable.

=== World War II ===
A Junkers Ju 88 of NJG 2 crashed at 1.25am on June 22 1941, being shot down by a Bristol Beaufighter 'R2069' of 25 Sqn at RAF Wittering.

- Pilot Oberfeldwebel Otto Wiese, aged 27, was killed
- Gefreiter Hermann Mandel, his parachute caught fire and he was killed. Both were buried at Cannock Chase
- Radio operator Unteroffizier Heinrich Beul baled out, taken prisoner and taken to RAF Wittering

The aircraft was shot down by Flying Officer Michel J. Herrick DFC, guided by a ground control unit at RAF Orby

== Geography ==
Deeping St James lies 1 mile (1.6 km) east from Market Deeping, to which it is conjoined, and on the River Welland, at the centre of rich sedimentary agricultural land on the B1166 and B1162 roads. With a population of 6,923 in 2,837 households, it is the largest of The Deepings parishes. It falls within the drainage basin of the Welland and Deepings Internal Drainage Board.

== Community ==
The parish church of St James is part of the Elloe West Deanery of the Diocese of Lincoln. The 2013 incumbent is The Reverend Sonia Marshall. There is also the Catholic church of Our Lady and St Guthlac, and a Methodist and two Baptist chapels. With St Guthlac's church in Market Deeping, these comprise the Churches Together in Deeping group.

The Deepings School, the main secondary school for the Deepings area, is located on Park Road. The school is next to the former Deepings Leisure Centre which permanently closed down in 2021.

The village has three public houses, Chinese restaurants and takeaways, a pizza restaurant, garage, home care provider, bakery/tea room, a garden railway specialist, and three computer systems companies.

Resident at Deeping St James is three-time BDO World Champion and three-time World Masters darts champion Martin Adams. In 2015 he was granted the freedom of Deeping St James by the local parish council. Composer Philip Spratley is also a resident.

== Sport ==
A short-lived greyhound racing track was opened at the rear of Bundle Farm on 13 June 1931. The racing was independent (not affiliated to the sports governing body the National Greyhound Racing Club) and was known as a flapping track, which was the nickname given to independent tracks. Racing was every Tuesday and Saturday.

== Archaeology ==
The village is notable for a significant assemblage of ceremonial regalia, including crumpled copper-alloy crowns and a bowl, dating to the late 2nd or early 3rd century AD. Evidence suggests that seasonal ceremonies related to agriculture and the periodic flooding of the river may have taken place here, with locals possibly wearing the crowns performing these rituals.

== Gallery ==
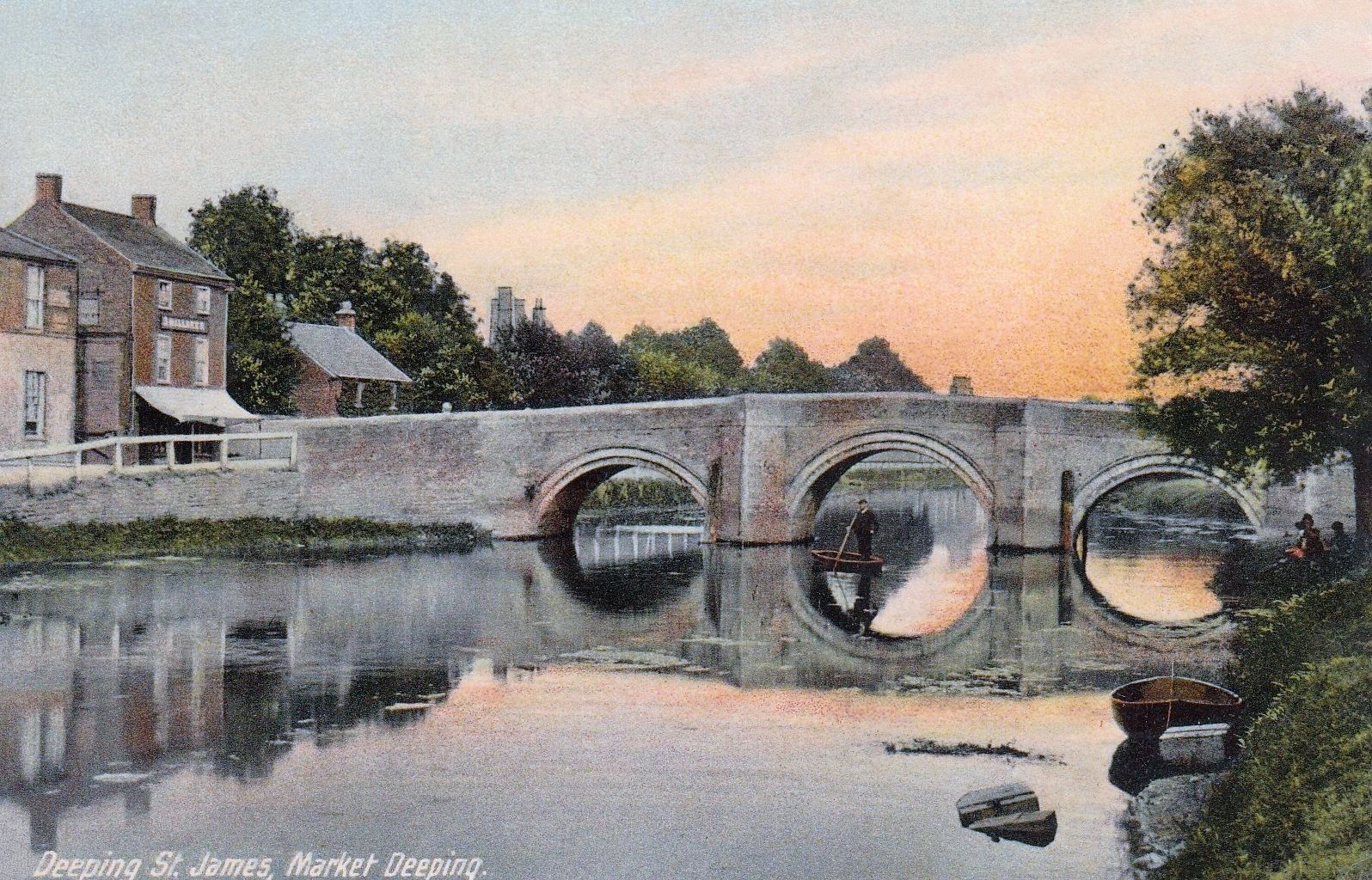
Grade II* listed 1651 Deeping Gate Bridge, photographed c. 1900

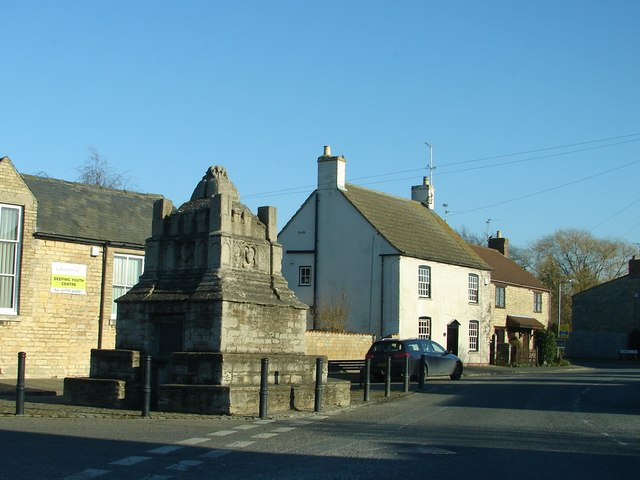
The 18th-century village lockup

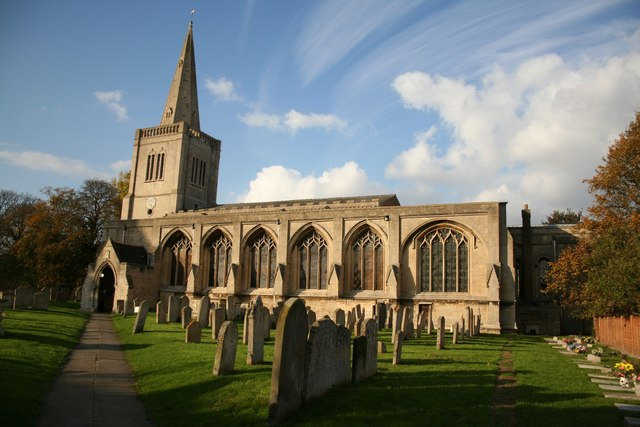
Deeping St James Priory Church

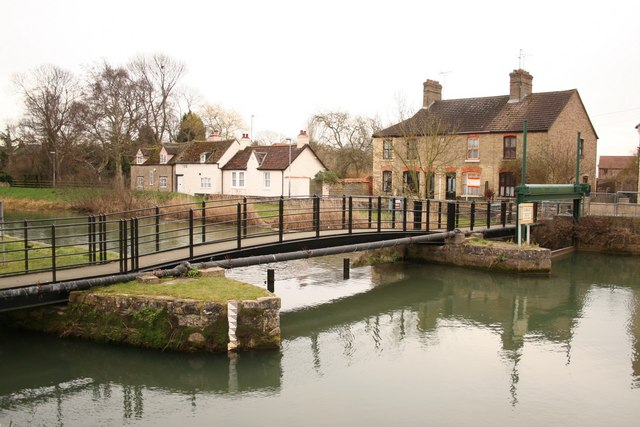
The High lock at Deeping St James
