= South Holland and The Deepings =

UK Parliament constituency (since 1997)

Coordinates: 52.75°N 0.10°W

- County constituency for the House of Commons
- Interactive map of boundaries since 2010
- Location within the East Midlands
- County: Lincolnshire
- Electorate: 76,139 (March 2020)
- Major settlements: Spalding, Holbeach, Long Sutton, Sutton Bridge and The Deepings

Current constituency
- Created: 1997
- Member of Parliament: Sir John Hayes (Conservative)
- Seats: One
- Created from: Holland with Boston, Stamford and Spalding

South Holland and The Deepings is a constituency in Lincolnshire represented in the House of Commons of the UK Parliament since its 1997 creation by John Hayes, a Conservative.

At the 2017 general election, the constituency recorded a higher Conservative share of the vote than any constituency since 1970, with 69.9% of voters backing the party. South Holland also delivered the second-highest "Leave" vote in the 2016 referendum on the UK's membership of the European Union (EU). 73.6% of voters endorsed the UK's withdrawal from the EU, second only to neighbouring Boston. At the 2019 general election, the Conservative majority was 62.7%, the highest of any Conservative in any constituency in any general election since Kensington South in 1955. Hayes took 75.9% of the vote, the third highest for the Conservatives only after Castle Point in Essex and Boston and Skegness.

== Constituency profile ==
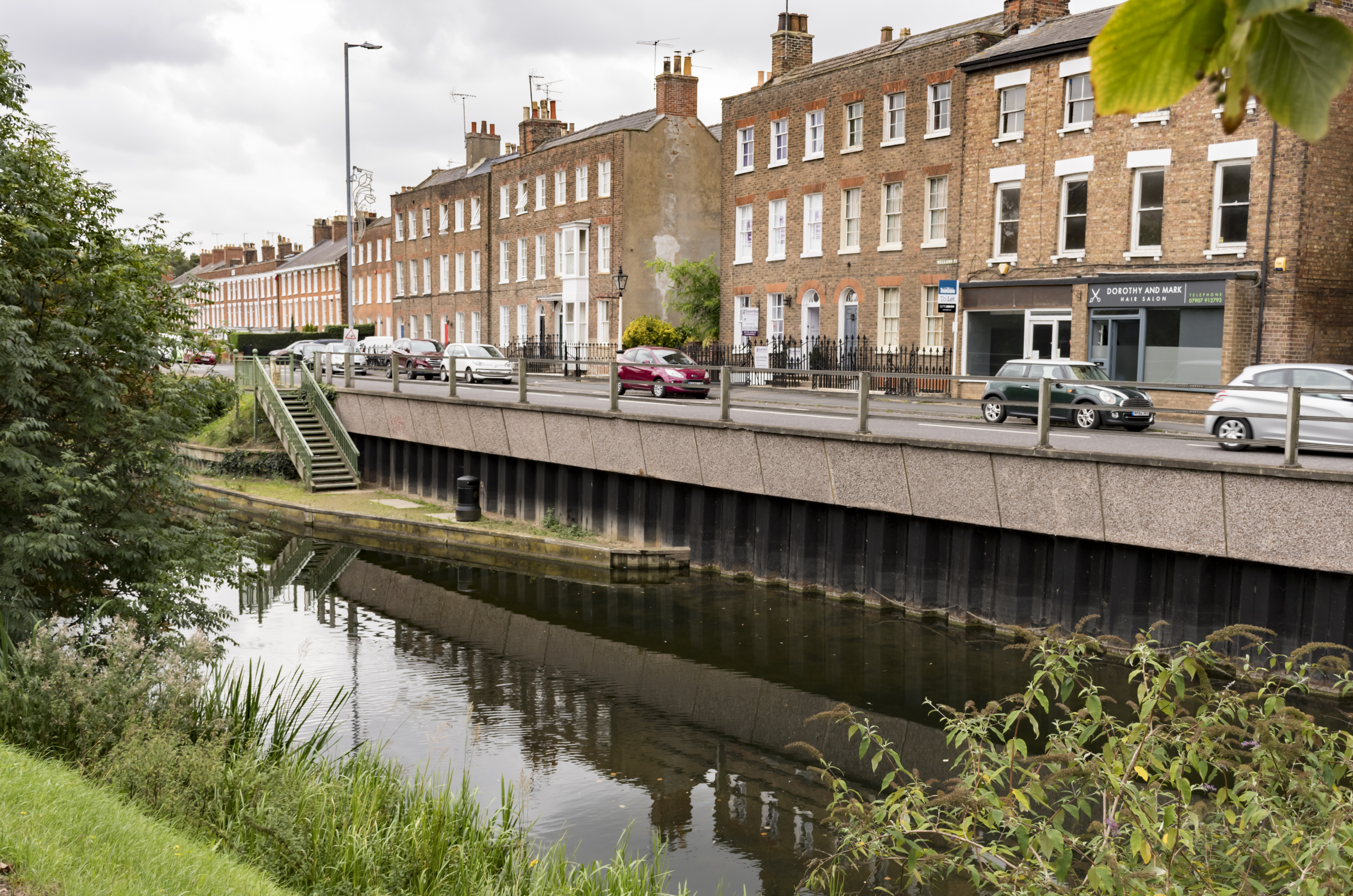
River Welland, Spalding

South Holland and The Deepings is a constituency in Lincolnshire in the East Midlands of England. It is named after the South Holland District and the town of Market Deeping and its nearby villages, collectively called the Deepings. The constituency's largest town is Spalding which has a population of around 31,000. Other settlements include the towns of Crowland, Holbeach, Long Sutton and Sutton Bridge and the villages of Pinchbeck and Donington.

This is a large, rural constituency with many small towns and villages. It lies within the Fens, a low-lying marshy region that was mostly drained in the early 19th century. Spalding is a historic market town and a centre for local agricultural trade; the surrounding area is a major producer of flowers (especially tulips) and vegetables. Most of the constituency has below-average levels of wealth, however Spalding and Market Deeping are more affluent. House prices here are generally similar to the rest of the East Midlands but lower than the UK average.

South Holland and The Deepings has a large retired population and low proportions of young and middle-aged adults. Residents have below-average rates of income but high levels of homeownership. The child poverty rate is in line with the overall UK figure. They have very low levels of education and are generally religious. A high proportion of residents work in the agriculture, retail and transport sectors and the percentage claiming unemployment benefits is low. White people made up 96% of the population at the 2021 census. Those of White non-British origin were 11% of residents, including many Poles and Lithuanians.

At the local district council level, most of the towns in this constituency are represented by independents and localists whilst the rural villages elected Conservatives. At the county council, which held elections more recently (in 2025), almost all seats in this constituency were won by Reform UK. Voters in South Holland and The Deepings overwhelmingly supported leaving the European Union in the 2016 referendum. An estimated 72% voted in favour of Brexit compared to the UK-wide figure of 52%, the ninth-highest percentage out of 650 constituencies nationwide according to Electoral Calculus.

== Boundaries ==
=== 1997–2010 ===
The District of South Holland, with the wards of Deeping St James, Market Deeping, West Deeping and Truesdale, which are all in the District of South Kesteven.

The constituency was created in 1997 from parts of the former seats of Holland with Boston and Stamford and Spalding. It covers the area around Spalding. It corresponds to the local government District of South Holland, but with Market Deeping, Deeping St James and West Deeping added.

=== Current ===
The District of South Holland, with the District of South Kesteven wards of Deeping St James, and Market & West Deeping.

In minor boundary changes that were put in place for the 2010 general election, parts of the two civil parishes of Baston and Langtoft, forming much of the Truesdale ward, were moved to the neighbouring constituency of Grantham and Stamford. This made Deeping St James, Market Deeping and West Deeping the only South Kesteven civil parishes to stay in the constituency, the remainder comprising South Holland District.

The 2023 review of Westminster constituencies left the boundaries unchanged.

== History ==
The last non-Conservative member for the predecessor main seat was Sir Herbert Butcher (served 1937–1966) who for much of that time was in the National Liberal Party set up in 1931.

The member from 1966 until 1997 was Richard Body for the main contributor seat (in later years as MP, knighted), who had previously been an MP during the Eden government and the start of the Macmillan government for Billericay, and later wrote assertive books on agriculture and on the Common Agricultural Policy.

In the 2017 general election, the seat returned the highest vote share for the Conservatives nationally at 69.9%. In the 2019 general election, it was an extremely safe Conservative seat. It had the largest percentage majority, third-largest absolute majority, and third-largest Conservative vote share of any seat held by the party; nationally the seat had the eleventh-largest percentage majority of any constituency.

== Members of Parliament ==
Holland with Boston and Stamford & Spalding prior to 1997

Election	Member	Party
1997	John Hayes	Conservative

== Elections ==
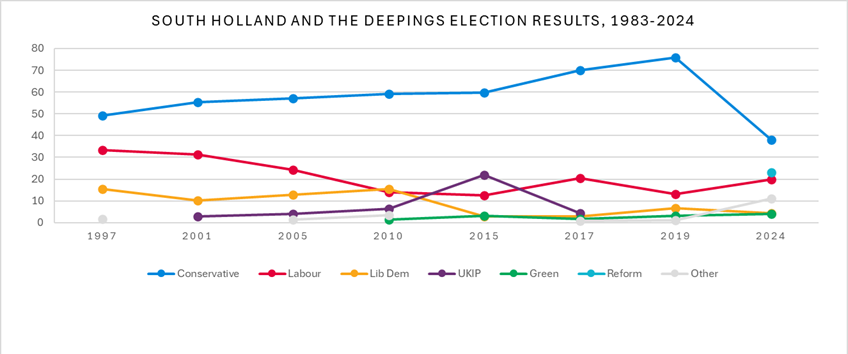
South Holland and the Deepings election results 1997–2024

=== Elections in the 2020s ===
General election 2024: South Holland and the Deepings
Party	Candidate	Votes	%	±%
Conservative	John Hayes	17,462	38.0	−37.9
Reform	Matthew Swainson	10,606	23.1	N/A
Labour	Paul Hilliar	9,086	19.8	+6.6
Independent	Mark Edward Le Sage	5,031	11.0	N/A
Liberal Democrats	Jack Braginton	1,945	4.2	−2.4
Green	Rhys Baker	1,800	3.9	+0.6
Majority		6,856	14.9	−47.8
Turnout		45,930	60.4	−4.3
Registered electors		78,473		
Conservative hold		Swing		

=== Elections in the 2010s ===
General election 2019: South Holland and the Deepings
Party	Candidate	Votes	%	±%
Conservative	John Hayes	37,338	75.9	+6.0
Labour	Mark Popple	6,500	13.2	−7.2
Liberal Democrats	Davina Kirby	3,225	6.6	+3.8
Green	Martin Blake	1,613	3.3	+1.5
Independent	Rick Stringer	503	1.0	+0.3
Majority		30,838	62.7	+13.2
Turnout		49,179	64.7	−1.1
Registered electors		75,990		
Conservative hold		Swing	+6.6	

General election 2017: South Holland and the Deepings
Party	Candidate	Votes	%	±%
Conservative	John Hayes	35,179	69.9	+10.3
Labour	Voyteck Kowalewski	10,282	20.4	+8.0
UKIP	Nicola Smith	2,185	4.3	−17.5
Liberal Democrats	Julia Cambridge	1,433	2.8	−0.2
Green	Daniel Wilshire	894	1.8	−1.4
Independent	Rick Stringer	342	0.7	New
Majority		24,897	49.5	+11.7
Turnout		50,315	65.8	−1.9
Registered electors		76,381		
Conservative hold		Swing	+1.2	

General election 2015: South Holland and the Deepings
Party	Candidate	Votes	%	±%
Conservative	John Hayes	29,303	59.6	+0.5
UKIP	David Parsons	10,736	21.8	+15.3
Labour	Matthew Mahabadi	6,122	12.4	−1.6
Green	Daniel Wilshire	1,580	3.2	+1.8
Liberal Democrats	George Smid	1,466	3.0	−12.5
Majority		18,567	37.8	−5.8
Turnout		49,207	63.9	+1.9
Registered electors		77,015		
Conservative hold		Swing	−7.9	

General election 2010: South Holland and the Deepings
Party	Candidate	Votes	%	±%
Conservative	John Hayes	29,639	59.1	+2.1
Liberal Democrats	Jennifer Conroy	7,759	15.5	+2.6
Labour	Gareth Gould	7,024	14.0	−10.5
UKIP	Richard Fairman	3,246	6.5	+2.5
BNP	Roy Harban	1,796	3.6	New
Green	Ashley Baxter	724	1.4	New
Majority		21,880	43.6	+11.1
Turnout		50,188	65.8	+4.3
Conservative hold		Swing	−0.2	

=== Elections in the 2000s ===
General election 2005: South Holland and The Deepings
Party	Candidate	Votes	%	±%
Conservative	John Hayes	27,544	57.1	+1.7
Labour	Linda Woodings	11,764	24.4	−7.0
Liberal Democrats	Steve Jarvis	6,244	12.9	+2.6
UKIP	Jamie Corney	1,950	4.0	+1.1
Independent	Paul Poll	747	1.5	New
Majority		15,780	32.7	+8.7
Turnout		48,249	60.6	−1.5
Conservative hold		Swing	+4.4	

General election 2001: South Holland and The Deepings
Party	Candidate	Votes	%	±%
Conservative	John Hayes	25,611	55.4	+6.1
Labour	Graham Walker	14,512	31.4	−1.9
Liberal Democrats	Grace Hill	4,761	10.3	−5.3
UKIP	Malcolm Charlesworth	1,318	2.9	New
Majority		11,099	24.0	+8.0
Turnout		46,202	62.1	−9.9
Conservative hold		Swing		

=== Elections in the 1990s ===
General election 1997: South Holland and The Deepings
Party	Candidate	Votes	%	±%
Conservative	John Hayes	24,691	49.3	
Labour	John Lewis	16,700	33.3	
Liberal Democrats	Peter Millen	7,836	15.6	
Non-party Conservative	Guy Erwood	902	1.8	
Majority		7,991	16.0	
Turnout		50,129	72.0	
Conservative win (new seat)				

== See also ==
- List of parliamentary constituencies in Lincolnshire
