= South Kesteven District Council elections =

Local government elections in Lincolnshire, England

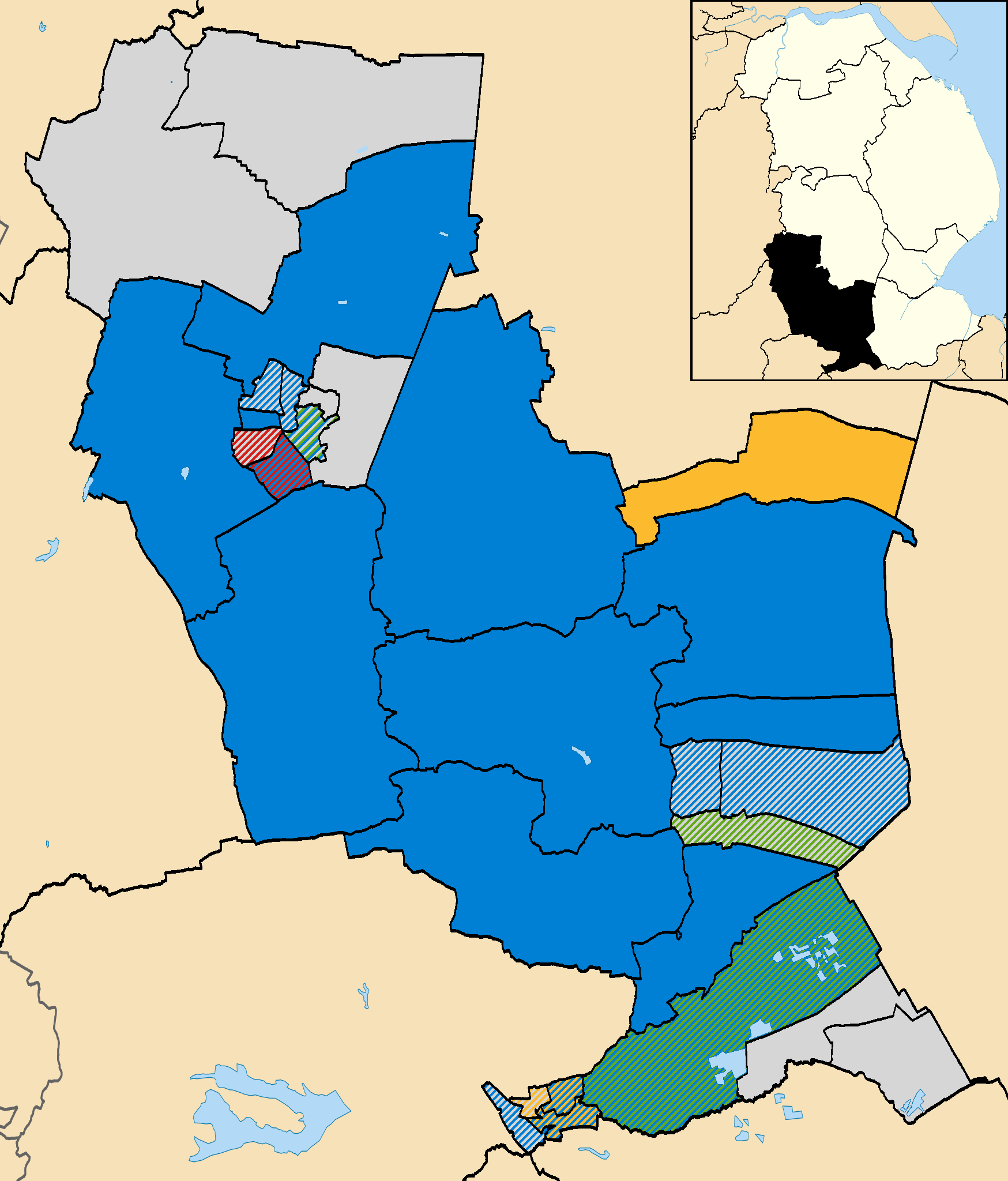
Map of the results of the 2023 South Kesteven District Council election. Conservatives in blue, Liberal Democrats in orange, Labour in red, Green Party in green, and independents in grey.

South Kesteven District Council in Lincolnshire, England is elected every four years. Since the last boundary changes in 2015, 56 councillors have been elected from 30 wards.

== Council elections ==
Summary of the results of recent council elections, click on the year for full details of each election. Boundary changes took place for the 1999 and 2015 elections, with the number of councillors being reduced from 58 to 56 in 2015.

- 1973 South Kesteven District Council election
- 1976 South Kesteven District Council election
- 1979 South Kesteven District Council election (New ward boundaries)
- 1983 South Kesteven District Council election

Year	Conservative	Independent	Labour	Lincolnshire Independents	UK Independence Party	Liberal Democrats	Others	Liberal (post 1989)	Liberal (pre 1989)	Vacant	Notes
1987	27	11	8	0	0	0	0	0	8	3	
1991	22	14	12	0	0	9	0	0	0	0	District boundary changes took place but the number of seats remained the same
1995	13	18	17	0	0	6	0	3	0	0	
1999	29	13	12	0	0	3	1	0	0	0	New ward boundaries
2003	31	12	10	0	0	5	0	0	0	0	
2007	35	15	2	0	0	6	0	0	0	0	
2011	38	12	6	1	0	1	0	0	0	0	
2015	45	6	3	1	1	0	0	0	0	0	New ward boundaries
2019	40	11	3	0	0	2	0	0	0	0	
2023	24	22	2	0	0	4	4	0	0	0	Others = Green Party

== District result maps ==
2003 results map

2007 results map

2011 results map

2015 results map

2019 results map

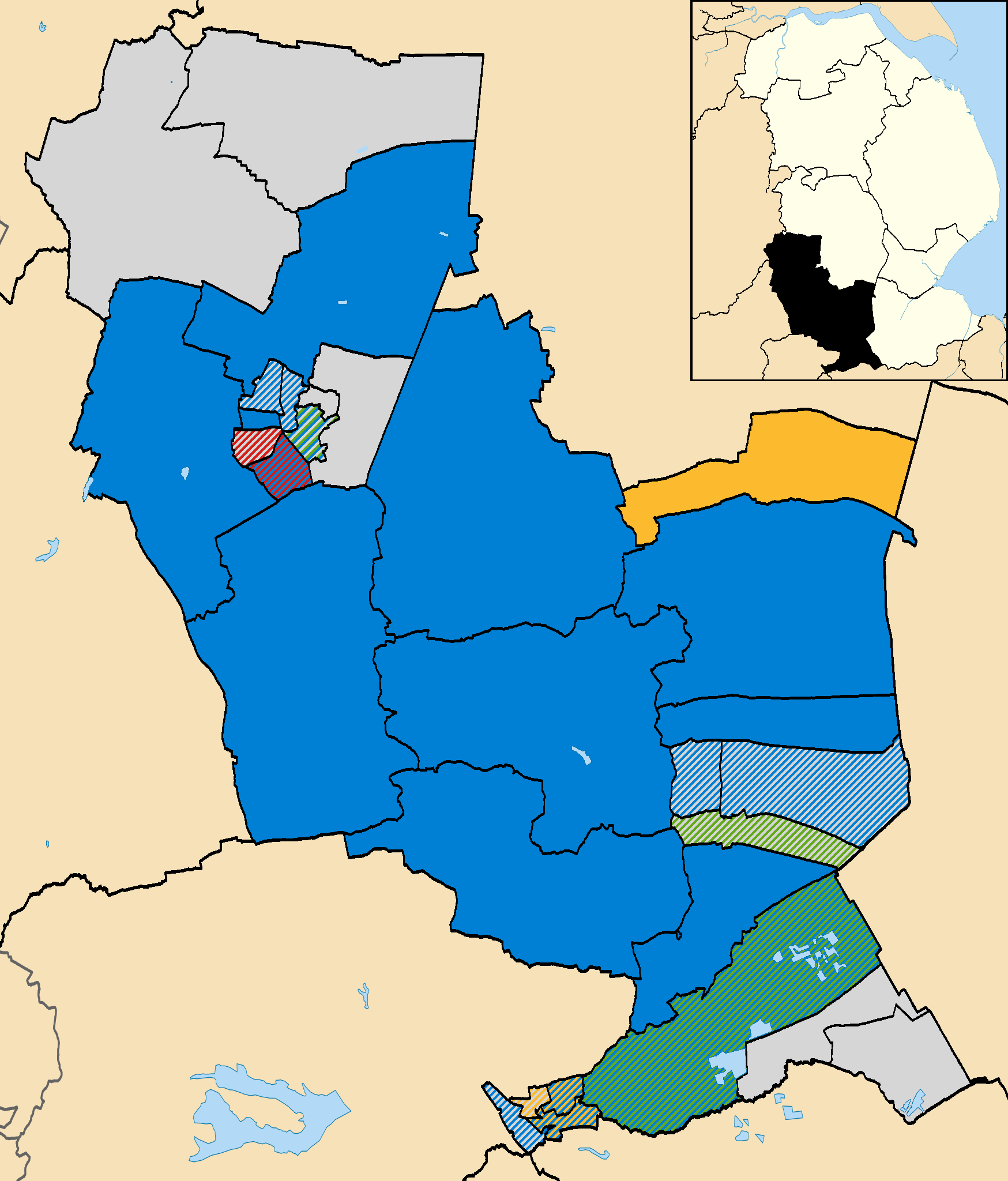
2023 results map

== By-election results ==
By-elections occur when seats become vacant between council elections. Below is a summary of recent by-elections; full by-election results can be found by clicking on the by-election name.

By-election	Date	Incumbent party	Winning party
Deeping St James	5 December 1996	Labour	Conservative
Heath	22 May 1997	Conservative	Ind. Conservative
Barrowby	17 July 1997	Independent	Conservative
Harrowby	17 July 1997	Labour	Independent Labour
Ringstone	17 July 1997	Independent	Independent
Harrowby	11 December 1997	Labour	Labour
Stamford St Johns	14 May 1998	Liberal Democrats	Conservative
Greyfriars	16 July 1998	Conservative	Conservative
Harrowby	24 August 2000	Labour	Conservative
All Saints	7 June 2001	Labour	Labour
St Mary's	7 June 2001	Conservative	Conservative
Greyfriars	21 October 2004	Conservative	Conservative
All Saints	1 September 2005	Conservative	Conservative
Earlesfield	1 September 2005	Labour	Labour
St Anne's	1 September 2005	Independent	Labour
Market and West Deeping	9 March 2006	Labour	Conservative
Truesdale	18 May 2006	Independent	Conservative
Aveland	13 March 2014	Conservative	Conservative
Belvoir	3 December 2015	Conservative	Conservative
Deeping St James	5 May 2016	Conservative	Conservative
Stamford St George's	15 March 2018	Conservative	Conservative
Stamford St John's	15 March 2018	Conservative	Conservative
Glen	6 May 2021	Conservative	Conservative
Grantham Arnoldfield	28 October 2021	Conservative	Conservative
Stamford All Saints	28 October 2021	Conservative	Independent
Aveland	24 February 2022	Conservative	Conservative
Isaac Newton	24 February 2022	Conservative	Conservative
Bourne East	10 November 2022	Conservative	Conservative
Grantham St Wulfram's	10 November 2022	Conservative	Conservative
Toller	15 December 2022	Independent	Liberal Democrats
Grantham St Wulfram's	9 November 2023	Conservative	Conservative
Aveland	11 December 2025	Conservative	Reform
Belmont	11 December 2025	Independent	Reform
Grantham St Wulfram's	22 October 2026	Independent	Conservative
