= 2015 South Kesteven District Council election =

2015 UK local government election

Map of the results of the 2015 South Kesteven District Council election. Conservatives in blue, independents in grey, Labour in red, UK Independence Party in purple and Lincolnshire Independents in black.

The 2015 South Kesteven District Council election took place on 7 May 2015 to elect members of South Kesteven District Council in Lincolnshire, England. The whole council was up for election after boundary changes reduced the number of seats by two. The Conservative Party stayed in overall control of the council.

== Background ==
After the previous election in 2011 the Conservatives remained in control of the council with 38 seats, compared to 12 independents, 6 for Labour and 1 each for the Liberal Democrats and Lincolnshire Independents. By the time of the 2015 election there were two UK Independence Party councillors, after Mike and Jean Taylor defected from the Conservatives in January 2015, following their failure to be re-selected as Conservative candidates for the council election. Meanwhile, in Harrowby ward the Labour councillors Ian Selby and Bruce Wells stood as independents after they were deselected by Labour.

The Conservative leader of the council Linda Neal stood down at the 2015 election, with Bob Adams being chosen to succeed her as Conservative group leader. A seat in Bourne West was vacant by the election after the death of Conservative councillor John Smith, while in Market and West Deeping ward the election was postponed until 25 June after the death of independent councillor Reg Howard.

Boundary changes since the 2011 election reduced the number of councillors from 58 to 56, while the number of wards declined from 34 to 30.

== Election result ==
The Conservatives kept a large majority on the council after winning 44 of the 53 seats contested on 7 May. The three seats in Market and West Deeping elected on 25 June had two independents and one Conservative councillors elected.

South Kesteven local election result 2015
Party	Seats	Gains	Losses	Net gain/loss	Seats %	Votes %	Votes	+/−
Conservative	45				83.0	51.4	53,130	+2.5
Independent	6				7.5	12.4	12,828	-12.2
Labour	3				5.7	15.2	15,696	+2.6
UKIP	1				1.9	10.0	10,300	+9.3
Lincolnshire Independent	1				1.9	2.9	3,013	+1.6
Stamford Group of Independents	0				0.0	4.7	4,865	+4.7
Green	0				0.0	1.9	1,943	-4.3
Liberal Democrats	0				0.0	1.6	1,667	-4.1

The above totals include the delayed election in Market and West Deeping ward.

== Ward results ==
Aveland
Party	Candidate	Votes	%	±%
Conservative	Peter Moseley	1,114	77.3	
Labour	Muriel Sowden	327	22.7	
Majority		787	54.6	
Turnout		1,441	72	

Belmont (2 seats)
Party	Candidate	Votes	%	±%
Conservative	George Chivers	1,350		
Conservative	Nicholas Craft	1,192		
Labour	Richard Galvin	680		
Labour	Victoria Smith	641		
Turnout		3,863	62	

Belvoir (2 seats)
Party	Candidate	Votes	%	±%
Conservative	Pamela Bosworth	1,749		
Conservative	Thomas Webster	1,570		
Labour	Jonathan Wacey	763		
Turnout		4,082	72	

Bourne Austerby (3 seats)
Party	Candidate	Votes	%	±%
Conservative	Duncan Ashwell	1,523		
Conservative	Jane Kingman	1,459		
Conservative	Robert Reid	1,190		
Independent	Paul Fellows	746		
Labour	James Marsden	647		
Lincolnshire Independent	John Ireland	642		
Turnout		6,207	62	

Bourne East (2 seats)
Party	Candidate	Votes	%	±%
Conservative	Robert Russell	1,153		
Conservative	Judith Smith	1,126		
UKIP	Roger Woodbridge	715		
Labour	Lisa Holmes	691		
Turnout		3,685	64	

Bourne West (2 seats)
Party	Candidate	Votes	%	±%
Conservative	David Mapp	1,518		
Lincolnshire Independent	Helen Powell	940		
UKIP	William Learoyd	837		
Conservative	Hannah Westropp	821		
Labour	Roberta Britton	654		
Turnout		4,770	69	

Casewick (2 seats)
Party	Candidate	Votes	%	±%
Conservative	Kelham Cooke	1,743		
Conservative	Rosemary Woolley	1,646		
Independent	Elizabeth Channell	722		
Independent	Thomas Butterfield	699		
Lincolnshire Independent	Justin Mackenzie	468		
Turnout		5,278	75	

Castle
Party	Candidate	Votes	%	±%
Conservative	Nicholas Robins	842	58.2	
Labour	Jean Joyce	319	22.0	
UKIP	David Plowright	286	19.8	
Majority		523	36.1	
Turnout		1,447	73	

Deeping St James (3 seats)
Party	Candidate	Votes	%	±%
Labour	Fair Deal Dilks	unopposed		
Conservative	Leigh Johnson	unopposed		
Independent	Judy Stevens	unopposed		

Dole Wood
Party	Candidate	Votes	%	±%
Conservative	Barry Dobson	893	61.7	
Lincolnshire Independent	Anthony Smith	554	38.3	
Majority		339	23.4	
Turnout		1,447	73	

Glen
Party	Candidate	Votes	%	±%
Conservative	Martin Wilkins	951	69.3	
UKIP	Patrick Beese	422	30.7	
Majority		529	38.5	
Turnout		1,373	74	

Grantham Arnoldfield (2 seats)
Party	Candidate	Votes	%	±%
Conservative	Helen Goral	1,203		
Conservative	Dean Ward	886		
UKIP	Michael Taylor	516		
UKIP	Jean Taylor	483		
Labour	Cash Carraway	382		
Labour	Tanwir Chowdhury	349		
Independent	Alfred Kent	335		
Turnout		4,154	68	

Grantham Barrowby Gate (2 seats)
Party	Candidate	Votes	%	±%
Conservative	Lynda Coutts	1,095		
Conservative	Frank Turner	842		
UKIP	John Allan	576		
UKIP	Simon Finch	523		
Labour	Elizabeth Ropson	474		
Labour	David Simpson	395		
Independent	Ian Mihill	354		
Green	Samuel Hadlow	249		
Turnout		4,508	64	

Grantham Earlesfield (2 seats)
Party	Candidate	Votes	%	±%
UKIP	Felicity Cunningham	903		
Labour	Tracey Forman	814		
Labour	Robert Shorrock	676		
Turnout		2,393	43	

Grantham Harrowby (2 seats)
Party	Candidate	Votes	%	±%
Independent	Ian Selby	770		
Conservative	Linda Wootten	749		
Labour	Susan Orwin	528		
Labour	Mark Ashberry	522		
Independent	Bruce Wells	514		
Lincolnshire Independent	Michael Williams	409		
Turnout		3,492	56	

Grantham Springfield (2 seats)
Party	Candidate	Votes	%	±%
Conservative	Nicola Manterfield	768		
Conservative	Adam Stokes	744		
Labour	Mark Bartlett	597		
UKIP	Maureen Simon	591		
Labour	Carole Thomson	433		
Green	Gerhard Lohmann-Bond	254		
Turnout		3,387	56	

Grantham St Vincents (3 seats)
Party	Candidate	Votes	%	±%
Conservative	Michael Cook	1,110		
Labour	Charmaine Morgan	938		
Conservative	Graham Jeal	894		
UKIP	Donald Atkinson	801		
Conservative	Stuart McBride	774		
Labour	John Morgan	699		
Labour	Alexander Morse	639		
Green	Caroline Coram	502		
Independent	Anita Selby	341		
Independent	Patricia Ellis	318		
Turnout		7,016	57	

Grantham St Wulfram's (2 seats)
Party	Candidate	Votes	%	±%
Conservative	Raymond Wootten	1,409		
Conservative	Jacqueline Smith	1,296		
UKIP	Paul Martin	685		
Labour	Yvonne Gibbins	639		
Labour	Stephen Diggines	620		
Turnout		4,649	63	

Isaac Newton (2 seats)
Party	Candidate	Votes	%	±%
Conservative	William Adams	1,388		
Conservative	Andrea Webster	891		
UKIP	Derek Creasey	734		
Labour	Paul Jacklin	486		
Turnout		3,499	63	

Lincrest
Party	Candidate	Votes	%	±%
Conservative	Peter Stephens	1,126	75.2	
Labour	Lee Steptoe	372	24.8	
Majority		754	50.3	
Turnout		1,498	75	

Loveden Heath
Party	Candidate	Votes	%	±%
Independent	Robert Sampson	924	59.2	
Conservative	Alexander Maughan	638	40.8	
Majority		286	18.3	
Turnout		1,562	73	

Morton
Party	Candidate	Votes	%	±%
Conservative	Frances Cartwright	680	50.5	
Independent	Richard Wells	667	49.5	
Majority		13	1.0	
Turnout		1,347	69	

Peascliffe and Ridgeway (2 seats)
Party	Candidate	Votes	%	±%
Conservative	Rosemary Brown	1,390		
Conservative	Ian Stokes	1,277		
Independent	Jeffrey Thompson	1,167		
Independent	John Andrews	776		
Turnout		4,610	70	

Stamford All Saints (2 seats)
Party	Candidate	Votes	%	±%
Conservative	Michael Exton	1,100		
Conservative	Breda-Rae Griffin	826		
Stamford Group of Independents	Susan Sandall	646		
Stamford Group of Independents	Maxwell Sawyer	609		
UKIP	Gareth Vaughan	603		
Labour	David Bimson	529		
Turnout		4,313	65	

Stamford St George's (2 seats)
Party	Candidate	Votes	%	±%
Conservative	Katherine Brown	926		
Conservative	Brenda Sumner	588		
UKIP	David Taylor	539		
Stamford Group of Independents	Percival Sandall	525		
Labour	John Godber	441		
Labour	Vivien Pointon	441		
Stamford Group of Independents	Gloria Johnson	403		
Green	Michael Carr	346		
Turnout		4,209	62	

Stamford St John's (2 seats)
Party	Candidate	Votes	%	±%
Conservative	Terl Bryant	1,385		
Conservative	Damian Evans	1,273		
Stamford Group of Independents	Clement Walden	820		
Stamford Group of Independents	Anthony Story	784		
UKIP	Allen Hewett	620		
Turnout		4,882	71	

Stamford St Mary's (2 seats)
Party	Candidate	Votes	%	±%
Conservative	Matthew Lee	967		
Conservative	Brian Sumner	890		
Liberal Democrats	Doarkanathsing Bisnauthsing	641		
Stamford Group of Independents	John Dawson	623		
Stamford Group of Independents	David Taylor	455		
Liberal Democrats	Pamela Bisnauthsing	349		
Green	Anushree Campbell	310		
Green	David Dorson	282		
Turnout		4,517	67	

Toller
Party	Candidate	Votes	%	±%
Conservative	Michael King	943	67.8	
Liberal Democrats	Brian Withnall	448	32.2	
Majority		495	35.6	
Turnout		1,391	68	

Viking (2 seats)
Party	Candidate	Votes	%	±%
Independent	Paul Wood	1,617		
Conservative	Sarah Wilks	1,332		
Conservative	Kathryn Wilks	1,295		
Independent	Laura King	1,231		
Turnout		5,475	74	

=== Market and West Deeping countermanded election ===
The election in Market and West Deeping ward was countermanded (delayed) until 25 June 2015 after the death of independent councillor Reg Howard who had been standing for re-election. Two of the three seats were won by independents Robert Broughton and Ashley Baxter, while Conservative Nicholas Neilson won the third seat.

Market and West Deeping (3 seats)
Party	Candidate	Votes	%	±%
Independent	Robert Broughton	612		
Independent	Ashley Baxter	609		
Conservative	Nicholas Neilson	605		
Independent	David Shelton	426		
Liberal Democrats	Adam Brookes	229		
UKIP	Robert O'Farrell	224		
UKIP	William Learoyd	129		
UKIP	Roger Woodbridge	113		
Turnout		1243	23.1	

== By-elections between 2015 and 2019 ==
=== Belvoir by-election ===
Belvoir by-election 3 December 2015
Party	Candidate	Votes	%	±%
Conservative	Hannah Westropp	603	52.5	−17.1
Independent	Laura King	212	18.5	+18.5
Labour	Louise Clack	175	15.2	−15.2
UKIP	Mike Taylor	159	13.8	+13.8
Majority		391	34.0	
Turnout		1,149		
Conservative hold		Swing		

=== Deeping St James by-election ===
Deeping St James by-election 5 May 2016
Party	Candidate	Votes	%	±%
Conservative	Steve Benn	784	49.7	N/A
Liberal Democrats	Adam Brookes	436	27.7	N/A
Labour	Lisa Holmes	286	18.1	N/A
Green	Gerhard Lohmann-Bond	70	4.4	N/A
Majority		348	22.1	
Turnout		1,576		
Conservative hold		Swing		

=== Stamford St George's by-election ===
Stamford St George's by-election 15 March 2018
Party	Candidate	Votes	%	±%
Conservative	Rachael Cooke	309	45.6	+12.3
Independent	Gloria Johnson	174	25.7	+6.8
Labour	Christopher Dennett	114	16.8	+0.9
Liberal Democrats	Jack Stow	68	10.0	+10.0
Green	Gerhard Lohmann-Bond	13	1.9	−10.3
Majority		135	19.9	
Turnout		678		
Conservative hold		Swing		

=== Stamford St John's by-election ===
Stamford St John's by-election 15 March 2018
Party	Candidate	Votes	%	±%
Conservative	David Taylor	327	39.4	−9.6
Independent	Steve Carroll	267	32.1	+32.1
Liberal Democrats	Harrish Bisnauthsing	156	18.8	+18.8
Labour	Cameron Clack	66	7.9	+7.9
Green	Simon Whitmore	15	1.8	+1.8
Majority		60	7.2	
Turnout		831		
Conservative hold		Swing		
