= 2007 South Kesteven District Council election =

2007 UK local government election

Map of the results of the 2007 South Kesteven District Council election. Conservatives in blue, independents in grey, Liberal Democrats in yellow and Labour in red.

The 2007 South Kesteven District Council election took place on 3 May 2007 to elect members of South Kesteven District Council in Lincolnshire, England. The whole council was up for election and the Conservative Party stayed in overall control of the council.

== Election result ==
The Conservatives kept a majority on the council making a net gain of one seat to have 35 councillors. The independents and Liberal Democrats also made gains at the expense of Labour who lost five of the seven seats they were defending. Overall turnout at the election was 35%, up from 29.65% at the last election in 2003.

The defeated Labour candidates included the group leader John Hurst, who lost his seat in Grantham St Johns to the Conservatives, and the party's deputy leader Rob Shorrock in Earlesfield, where independent candidates took two of the three seats for the ward. Labour also lost seats in St Anne's ward to an independent and a Conservative, as well as a seat in Isaac Newton ward to the Conservatives, however Labour did gain a seat in Harrowby. Other changes had Conservative council cabinet member Terl Bryant lose in All Saints ward, but a Conservative candidate defeated independent councillor Angeline Percival in Glen Eden.

South Kesteven local election result 2007
Party	Seats	Gains	Losses	Net gain/loss	Seats %	Votes %	Votes	+/−
Conservative	35			+1	60.3	43.6	20,165	-0.3
Independent	15			+3	25.9	28.6	13,220	+8.4
Liberal Democrats	6	1	0	+1	10.3	13.4	6,202	-2.1
Labour	2	1	6	-5	3.4	11.8	5,479	-7.6
Green	0	0	0	0	0.0	1.4	667	+0.3
UKIP	0	0	0	0	0.0	0.9	409	+0.9
Organisation of Free Democrats	0	0	0	0	0.0	0.2	112	+0.2

== Ward results ==
All Saints (2 seats)
Party	Candidate	Votes	%	±%
Independent	Susan Sandall	639		
Liberal Democrats	Sam Jalili	533		
Conservative	David Brailsford	378		
Conservative	Terl Bryant	346		
Turnout		1,896		
Independent gain from Conservative		Swing		
Liberal Democrats gain from Conservative		Swing		

Aveland
Party	Candidate	Votes	%	±%
Conservative	Andrea Webster	unopposed		
Conservative hold		Swing		

Barrowby
Party	Candidate	Votes	%	±%
Conservative	Pam Bosworth	unopposed		
Conservative hold		Swing		

Belmont (2 seats)
Party	Candidate	Votes	%	±%
Conservative	George Chivers	unopposed		
Conservative	Nick Craft	unopposed		
Conservative hold		Swing		
Conservative hold		Swing		

Bourne East (3 seats)
Party	Candidate	Votes	%	±%
Conservative	Judy Smith	1,019		
Conservative	David Higgs	744		
Conservative	Bob Russell	744		
Independent	Guy Cudmore	696		
Labour	Jean Joyce	600		
Turnout		3,803		
Conservative gain from Independent		Swing		
Conservative hold		Swing		
Conservative hold		Swing		

Bourne West (3 seats)
Party	Candidate	Votes	%	±%
Independent	Trevor Holmes	940		
Conservative	John Smith	762		
Conservative	Linda Neal	754		
Conservative	Brian Fines	728		
Independent	Helen Powell	608		
Independent	Derrick Crump	332		
Turnout		4,124		
Independent gain from Conservative		Swing		
Conservative hold		Swing		
Conservative hold		Swing		

Deeping St James (3 seats)
Party	Candidate	Votes	%	±%
Conservative	Ray Auger	969		
Liberal Democrats	Kenneth Joynson	947		
Conservative	Bryan Helyar	778		
Labour	'Fair Deal' Phil Dilks	652		
Turnout		3,346		
Conservative hold		Swing		
Liberal Democrats hold		Swing		
Conservative hold		Swing		

Earlesfield (3 seats)
Party	Candidate	Votes	%	±%
Independent	Jock Kerr	401		
Labour	Alan Davidson	330		
Independent	Stuart McBride	313		
Conservative	Adam Stokes	290		
Labour	Yvonne Gibbins	287		
Conservative	Jean Taylor	279		
Independent	Ken Linford	265		
Labour	Rob Shorrock	252		
Turnout		2,417		
Independent gain from Labour		Swing		
Labour hold		Swing		
Independent gain from Labour		Swing		

Ermine
Party	Candidate	Votes	%	±%
Conservative	Trevor Scott	unopposed		
Conservative hold		Swing		

Forest
Party	Candidate	Votes	%	±%
Conservative	Paul Carpenter	434	63.1	
Liberal Democrats	Owen Handford	254	36.9	
Majority		180	26.2	
Turnout		688		
Conservative hold		Swing		

Glen Eden
Party	Candidate	Votes	%	±%
Conservative	Maureen Spencer-Gregson	430	52.5	
Independent	Angeline Percival	389	47.5	
Majority		41	5.0	
Turnout		819		
Conservative gain from Independent		Swing		

Grantham St John's (2 seats)
Party	Candidate	Votes	%	±%
Conservative	Stuart Farrar	348		
Conservative	Benjamin Newcombe-Jones	289		
Labour	John Hurst	279		
Independent	Paul Abraham	241		
Labour	Steve Prince	229		
Independent	Chris Osborne	226		
Organisation of Free Democrats	John Andrews	112		
Turnout		1,724		
Conservative gain from Independent		Swing		
Conservative gain from Labour		Swing		

Green Hill (2 seats)
Party	Candidate	Votes	%	±%
Conservative	Alan Parkin	513		
Conservative	Frank Turner	493		
Independent	Alwyn Todd	461		
Independent	Delia Hearmon	328		
Turnout		1,795		
Conservative hold		Swing		
Conservative hold		Swing		

Greyfriars (2 seats)
Party	Candidate	Votes	%	±%
Conservative	Mike Taylor	442		
Conservative	Ian Stokes	405		
Independent	Roy Williams	253		
Independent	Philip Burrows	209		
Labour	Erica South	152		
Labour	David Burling	139		
Liberal Democrats	Simon Finch	128		
Turnout		1,728		
Conservative hold		Swing		
Conservative hold		Swing		

Harrowby (3 seats)
Party	Candidate	Votes	%	±%
Independent	Mike Williams	556		
Labour	Ian Selby	532		
Independent	Avril Williams	501		
Independent	Colin Thulborn	490		
Labour	Charmaine Morgan	407		
Labour	John Morgan	404		
Conservative	Alvina Newnham	364		
Turnout		3,254		
Independent hold		Swing		
Labour gain from Independent		Swing		
Independent hold		Swing		

Heath
Party	Candidate	Votes	%	±%
Conservative	Peter Martin-Mayhew	unopposed		
Conservative hold		Swing		

Hillsides
Party	Candidate	Votes	%	±%
Independent	Ibis Channell	461	58.6	−2.1
Conservative	Rosemary Woolley	326	41.4	+2.1
Majority		135	17.2	−4.2
Turnout		787		
Independent hold		Swing		

Isaac Newton
Party	Candidate	Votes	%	±%
Conservative	Bob Adams	494	78.8	+30.3
Liberal Democrats	Kathleen Tanner	133	21.2	+21.2
Majority		361	57.6	
Turnout		627		
Conservative gain from Labour		Swing		

Lincrest
Party	Candidate	Votes	%	±%
Conservative	Peter Stephens	unopposed		
Conservative hold		Swing		

Loveden
Party	Candidate	Votes	%	±%
Independent	Albert Kerr	unopposed		
Independent hold		Swing		

Market and West Deeping (3 seats)
Party	Candidate	Votes	%	±%
Independent	Reg Howard	903		
Conservative	Michael Exton	827		
Independent	Bob Broughton	806		
Green	Ashley Baxter	667		
Labour	Roy Bell	360		
Turnout		3,563		
Independent hold		Swing		
Conservative hold		Swing		
Independent gain from Conservative		Swing		

Morkery
Party	Candidate	Votes	%	±%
Conservative	Margery Radley	unopposed		
Conservative hold		Swing		

Peascliffe
Party	Candidate	Votes	%	±%
Independent	Jeff Thompson	unopposed		
Independent hold		Swing		

Ringstone
Party	Candidate	Votes	%	±%
Conservative	Frances Cartwright	unopposed		
Conservative hold		Swing		

Saxonwell
Party	Candidate	Votes	%	±%
Independent	Paul Wood	unopposed		
Independent hold		Swing		

St Annes's (2 seats)
Party	Candidate	Votes	%	±%
Independent	Rob Hearmon	461		
Conservative	Michael Cook	428		
Independent	Bruce Wells	359		
Labour	Fereshteh Hurst	269		
Labour	Alan Kane	232		
Turnout		1,749		
Independent gain from Labour		Swing		
Conservative gain from Labour		Swing		

St George's (2 seats)
Party	Candidate	Votes	%	±%
Independent	Bob Sandall	522		
Liberal Democrats	Joyce Gaffigan	436		
Conservative	Shirley Chapman	370		
Labour	Bill Turner	355		
Conservative	Brenda Sumner	347		
Turnout		2,030		
Independent gain from Conservative		Swing		
Liberal Democrats hold		Swing		

St Mary's (2 seats)
Party	Candidate	Votes	%	±%
Independent	John Dawson	531		
Conservative	John Harvey	500		
Conservative	Graham Wheatley	494		
Independent	Robert Conboy	438		
Liberal Democrats	Jane Peckett	406		
Liberal Democrats	Tim Fitzgerald	319		
Turnout		2,688		
Conservative hold		Swing		
Independent gain from Independent		Swing		

St Wulfram's (2 seats)
Party	Candidate	Votes	%	±%
Conservative	Graham Wheat	568		
Conservative	Ray Wootten	505		
Independent	Barry Phillips	491		
Independent	Ian Mihill	400		
Liberal Democrats	Martin James	249		
Liberal Democrats	Judy Smith	239		
Turnout		2,452		
Conservative hold		Swing		
Conservative hold		Swing		

Stamford St John's (3 seats)
Party	Candidate	Votes	%	±%
Liberal Democrats	Harrish Bisnauthsing	909		
Liberal Democrats	Maureen Jalili	838		
Liberal Democrats	Christine Brough	811		
Conservative	David Nalson	794		
Conservative	John Judge	766		
Conservative	Brian Sumner	721		
Turnout		4,839		
Liberal Democrats hold		Swing		
Liberal Democrats hold		Swing		
Liberal Democrats hold		Swing		

Thurlby
Party	Candidate	Votes	%	±%
Conservative	John Nicholson	unopposed		
Conservative hold		Swing		

Toller
Party	Candidate	Votes	%	±%
Conservative	Reg Lovelock	unopposed		
Conservative hold		Swing		

Truesdale (2 seats)
Party	Candidate	Votes	%	±%
Conservative	Andrew Moore	878		
Conservative	Tom Webster	638		
UKIP	Tom Butterfield	409		
Turnout		1,925		
Conservative gain from Independent		Swing		
Conservative hold		Swing		

Witham Valley
Party	Candidate	Votes	%	±%
Conservative	Rosemary Kaberry-Brown	unopposed		
Conservative hold		Swing		
