= 2019 South Kesteven District Council election =

South Kesteven District Council election

- 2 May 2019

All 56 seats on South Kesteven District Council 29 seats needed for a majority

	First party	Second party	Third party
Leader	Matthew Lee
Party	Conservative	Independent	Labour
Last election	45 seats, 51.4%	6 seats, 12.4%	3 seats, 15.2%
Seats before	45	6 (Note: Plus one seat held by Lincolnshire Independents.)	3
Seats after	40	11	3
Seat change	▼5	▲5	Steady
Popular vote	27,924	10,053	9,691
Percentage	53.3%	19.2%	18.5%
Swing	▲1.9%	▲6.8%	▲3.3%
	Fourth party	Fifth party	Sixth party
Party	Liberal Democrats	Green	UKIP
Last election	0 seats, 1.6%	0 seats, 1.9%	1 seat, 10.0%
Seats before	0	0	1
Seats after	2	0	0
Seat change	▲2	Steady	▼1
Popular vote	1,749	2,014	928
Percentage	3.3%	3.8%	1.8%
Swing	▲1.7%	▲1.9%	▼8.2%
- Map of the results of the 2019 South Kesteven District Council election. Conservatives in blue, Liberal Democrats in orange, Labour in red, and independents in grey.
Leader before election
Matthew Lee
Conservative
Leader after election
Matthew Lee
Conservative

The 2019 South Kesteven District Council election took place on 2 May 2019 to elect members of South Kesteven District Council. This was on the same day as other local elections. The entire council (56 seats) was up for election. The incumbent Conservatives lost 5 seats and UKIP lost 1, while independents gained 5 and the Liberal Democrats gained 2, though the Conservatives, led by Matthew Lee, retained a comfortable majority on the council. Two wards (Aveland and Dole Wood) did not hold a vote, as an equal number of candidates ran as seats available.

== Results ==
South Kesteven District Council election result 2019
Party	Seats	Gains	Losses	Net gain/loss	Seats %	Votes %	Votes	+/−
Conservative	40	1	6	-5	71.4	53.3	27,924	+1.9
Independent	11	5	0	+5	19.6	19.2	10,053	+6.8
Labour	3	1	1	-	5.6	18.5	9,691	+3.3
Liberal Democrats	2	2	0	+2	3.6	3.3	1,749	+1.7
Green	0	0	0	-	0.0	3.8	2,014	+1.9
UKIP	0	0	1	-1	0.0	1.8	928	-8.2

== Results by ward ==
=== Aveland ===
Aveland
Party	Candidate	Votes	%
Conservative	Peter Moseley	N/A	N/A
Turnout		N/A	N/A
Conservative hold			

No election was held, as just 1 candidate ran for the seat.

=== Belmont ===
Belmont
Party	Candidate	Votes	%
Conservative	George Chivers	475	51.19
Conservative	Linda Wootten	457	49.25
Labour	Phil Gadd	298	32.11
Labour	Janie Lee	239	25.75
UKIP	Joshua Scarborough	193	20.80
Turnout		956	27.35
Conservative hold			
Conservative hold			

=== Belvoir ===
Belvoir
Party	Candidate	Votes	%
Conservative	Pam Bosworth	867	65.24
Conservative	Hannah Westropp	825	62.08
Labour	Andrew Blackwell	348	26.19
Labour	Veronica Townsend	337	25.36
Turnout		1,389	35.16
Conservative hold			
Conservative hold			

=== Bourne Austerby ===
Bourne Austerby
Party	Candidate	Votes	%
Independent	Paul Fellows	678	53.39
Conservative	Robert Reid	507	39.92
Conservative	Jane Kingman	500	39.37
Green	Simon Whitmore	390	30.71
Conservative	Brian Sumner	265	20.87
Liberal Democrats	Ian Smith	232	18.27
Labour	Bob Mumby	231	18.19
Turnout		1,280	23.75
Independent gain from Conservative			
Conservative hold			
Conservative hold			

=== Bourne East ===
Bourne East
Party	Candidate	Votes	%
Independent	Philip Knowles	558	55.80
Conservative	Judith Smith	459	45.90
Conservative	Julia Reid	369	36.90
Labour	James Marsden	193	19.30
Turnout		1,012	28.43
Independent gain from Conservative			
Conservative hold			

=== Bourne West ===
Bourne West
Party	Candidate	Votes	%
Independent	Anna Kelly	740	59.20
Conservative	Helen Crawford	638	51.04
Conservative	Penny Johnson	393	31.44
Labour	Steve Gabbutt	251	20.08
Turnout		1,258	31.53
Independent gain from Lincolnshire Independent			
Conservative hold			

=== Casewick ===
Casewick
Party	Candidate	Votes	%
Conservative	Kelham Cooke	1,039	75.13
Conservative	Rosemary Trollope-Bellew	969	70.07
Labour	Barry Hare	301	21.76
Turnout		1,433	32.52
Conservative hold			
Conservative hold			

=== Castle ===
Castle
Party	Candidate	Votes	%
Conservative	Nicholas Robins	365	47.77
Independent	David Fowler	327	42.80
Labour	Harry Podro	72	9.42
Majority		38	4.97
Turnout		774	39.98
Conservative hold			

=== Deeping St James ===
Deeping St James
Party	Candidate	Votes	%
Independent	Philip Dilks	1,291	69.30
Conservative	Judy Stevens	945	50.72
Conservative	Jill Thomas	714	38.33
Labour	Hilary Hosking	461	24.75
Conservative	Andy Halfhide	349	18.73
Turnout		1,879	33.61
Independent hold			
Conservative hold			
Conservative gain from Labour			

Philip Dilks had been elected in 2015 as Labour, and Judy Stevens as an independent.

=== Dole Wood ===
Dole Wood
Party	Candidate	Votes	%
Conservative	Barry Dobson	N/A	N/A
Turnout		N/A	N/A
Conservative hold			

No election was held, as just 1 candidate ran for the seat.

=== Glen ===
Glen
Party	Candidate	Votes	%
Conservative	Chris Benn	493	75.04
UKIP	Patrick Beese	164	24.96
Majority		329	50.08
Turnout		723	38.27
Conservative hold			

=== Grantham Arnoldfield ===
Grantham Arnoldfield
Party	Candidate	Votes	%
Conservative	Helen Goral	655	68.44
Conservative	Dean Ward	612	63.95
Labour	Peter Davies	232	24.24
Labour	Arron Hogg	225	23.51
Turnout		1,006	26.28
Conservative hold			
Conservative hold			

=== Grantham Barrowby Gate ===
Grantham Barrowby Gate
Party	Candidate	Votes	%
Conservative	Mark Whittington	607	66.27
Conservative	John Cottier	571	62.34
Labour	Jonathan Wacey	285	31.11
Labour	Stephen Backhouse	255	27.84
Turnout		970	24.71
Conservative hold			
Conservative hold			

=== Grantham Earlesfield ===
Grantham Earlesfield
Party	Candidate	Votes	%
Labour	Louise Clack	367	48.74
Labour	Lee Steptoe	298	39.58
UKIP	Bruce Wells	257	34.13
Conservative	Gareth Knight	188	24.97
Conservative	Katy Williams	164	21.78
Turnout		758	18.90
Labour gain from UKIP			
Labour hold			

=== Grantham Harrowby ===
Grantham Harrowby
Party	Candidate	Votes	%
Independent	Ian Selby	632	68.40
Conservative	Hilary Westropp	198	21.43
Conservative	Peter Stephens	187	20.24
Labour	Jessie Shorrock	177	19.16
Labour	Christopher Dennett	165	17.86
Turnout		943	25.56
Independent hold			
Conservative hold			

=== Grantham Springfield ===
Grantham Springfield
Party	Candidate	Votes	%
Conservative	Nikki Manterfield	384	50.93
Conservative	Adam Stokes	382	50.66
Labour	Bernice Cullimore	314	41.64
Labour	Rob Shorrock	314	41.64
Turnout		798	21.31
Conservative hold			
Conservative hold			

=== Grantham St Vincent's ===
Grantham St Vincent's
Party	Candidate	Votes	%
Labour	Charmaine Morgan	610	44.69
Conservative	Graham Jeal	522	38.24
Conservative	Annie Mason	483	35.38
Conservative	Owen Pugh	481	35.24
Labour	Edward Clarke	478	35.02
Labour	John Morgan	422	30.92
Green	Helen Andrews	405	29.67
Green	Ian Andrews	316	23.15
Turnout		1,407	26.66
Labour hold			
Conservative hold			
Conservative hold			

=== Grantham St Wulfram's ===
Grantham St Wulfram's
Party	Candidate	Votes	%
Conservative	Ray Wootten	720	57.74
Conservative	Jacky Smith	628	50.36
Green	Ian Simmons	280	22.45
Green	Anne Gayfer	266	21.33
Labour	Carole Thomson	204	16.36
Labour	Wayne Hasnip	198	15.88
Turnout		1,272	31.07
Conservative hold			
Conservative hold			

=== Isaac Newton ===
Isaac Newton
Party	Candidate	Votes	%
Conservative	Bob Adams	627	69.82
Conservative	David Bellamy	576	64.14
Labour	Paula Tangney	206	22.94
Labour	Vincent Tangney	165	18.37
Turnout		944	25.58
Conservative hold			
Conservative hold			

=== Lincrest ===
Lincrest
Party	Candidate	Votes	%
Conservative	Sarah Trotter	564	73.82
Labour	Steve Welton	200	26.18
Majority		364	47.64
Turnout		822	41.47
Conservative hold			

=== Loveden Heath ===
Loveden Heath
Party	Candidate	Votes	%
Independent	Penny Milnes	442	51.58
Independent	Peter Sandy	193	22.52
Conservative	Mary Whittington	169	19.72
Labour	Paul Jacklin	53	6.18
Turnout		865	41.63
Independent hold			

=== Market and West Deeping ===
Market and West Deeping
Party	Candidate	Votes	%
Independent	Ashley Baxter	1,126	62.83
Conservative	Bob Broughton	774	43.19
Independent	Virginia Moran	766	42.75
Independent	Wayne Lester	588	32.81
Liberal Democrats	Adam Brookes	493	27.51
Conservative	Nick Neilson	448	25.00
Conservative	Josh Yarham	375	20.93
Turnout		1,796	33.90
Independent hold			
Conservative hold			
Independent hold			

=== Morton ===
Morton
Party	Candidate	Votes	%
Conservative	Sue Woolley	416	73.89
Labour	Edward Mumby	147	26.11
Majority		269	47.78
Turnout		588	30.28
Conservative hold			

=== Peascliffe and Ridgeway ===
Peascliffe and Ridgeway
Party	Candidate	Votes	%
Conservative	Rosemary Kaberry-Brown	657	56.44
Conservative	Ian Stokes	626	53.78
Green	John Andrews	357	30.67
Labour	Tracey Forman	171	14.69
Labour	Tatenda Chipunza	122	10.48
Turnout		1,209	30.83
Conservative hold			
Conservative hold			

=== Stamford All Saints ===
Stamford All Saints
Party	Candidate	Votes	%
Conservative	Breda-Rae Griffin	562	60.11
Conservative	Mike Exton	533	57.01
Labour	Nicolette Morphy	343	36.68
Turnout		972	25.51
Conservative hold			
Conservative hold			

=== Stamford St George's ===
Stamford St George's
Party	Candidate	Votes	%
Conservative	Gloria Johnson	398	39.10
Liberal Democrats	Amanda Wheeler	398	39.10
Conservative	Maxine Couch	342	33.60
Labour	Claire Campbell	287	28.19
UKIP	David Taylor	190	18.66
Turnout		1,030	26.92
Conservative hold			
Liberal Democrats gain from Conservative			

=== Stamford St John's ===
Stamford St John's
Party	Candidate	Votes	%
Conservative	John Dawson	531	50.19
Conservative	Susan Sandall	531	50.19
Independent	Steve Carroll	507	47.92
Labour	Brenda Smith	193	18.24
Turnout		1,071	26.26
Conservative hold			
Conservative hold			

=== Stamford St Mary's ===
Stamford St Mary's
Party	Candidate	Votes	%
Liberal Democrats	Harrish Bisnauthsing	626	50.73
Conservative	Matthew Lee	617	50.00
Conservative	David Taylor	610	49.43
Labour	Deborah Hughes	283	22.93
Turnout		1,287	35.05
Liberal Democrats gain from Conservative			
Conservative hold			

=== Toller ===
Toller
Party	Candidate	Votes	%
Independent	Jan Hansen	388	51.46
Conservative	Mike King	366	48.54
Majority		22	2.92
Turnout		764	37.27
Independent gain from Conservative			

=== Viking ===
Viking
Party	Candidate	Votes	%
Independent	Paul Wood	988	63.78
Independent	Jane Wood	829	53.52
Conservative	Claire Storer	423	27.31
Conservative	Sarah Stokes	368	23.76
Labour	Graham Louth	128	8.26
UKIP	Xandra Arundel	124	8.01
Labour	Sven Tasker	118	7.62
Turnout		1,556	38.79
Independent hold			
Independent gain from Conservative			

== Changes 2019–2023 ==
=== By-elections ===
==== Glen by-election ====
Glen by-election 6 May 2021
Party	Candidate	Votes	%	±%
Conservative	Penny Robins	585	77.8	+2.8
Labour	Paul Richardson	167	22.2	+22.2
Majority		418	55.6	
Turnout		752		
Conservative hold		Swing		

The by-election was held after Conservative councillor Chris Benn resigned on health grounds.

==== Grantham Arnoldfield by-election ====
Grantham Arnoldfield by-election 28 October 2021
Party	Candidate	Votes	%	±%
Conservative	Kaffy Rice-Oxley	460	65.0	−8.8
Labour	Stuart Fawcett	136	19.2	−7.0
Green	Mike Turner	112	15.8	+15.8
Majority		324	45.8	
Turnout		708		
Conservative hold		Swing		

The by-election was held after Conservative councillor Helen Goral resigned.

==== Stamford All Saints by-election ====
Stamford All Saints by-election 28 October 2021
Party	Candidate	Votes	%	±%
Independent	Richard Cleaver	496	57.0	+57.0
Conservative	Amanda Schonhut	214	24.6	−37.5
Independent	Tony Story	114	13.1	+13.1
Independent	Maxwell Sawyer	46	5.3	+5.3
Majority		282	32.4	
Turnout		870		
Independent gain from Conservative		Swing		

The by-election was held following the death of Conservative councillor Mike Exton.

==== Aveland by-election ====
Aveland by-election 24 February 2022
Party	Candidate	Votes	%	±%
Conservative	Richard Dixon-Warren	373	72.4	N/A
Labour	Barry Hare	142	27.6	N/A
Majority		231	44.9	
Turnout		515		
Conservative hold		Swing		

The by-election was held after Conservative councillor Peter Moseley resigned following controversial tweets in which he compared vaccine mandates introduced by Canadian prime minister Justin Trudeau to Nazi Germany.

==== Isaac Newton by-election ====
Isaac Newton by-election 24 February 2022
Party	Candidate	Votes	%	±%
Conservative	Ben Green	412	51.8	−23.5
Independent	Andrew Skelton	165	20.7	+20.7
Labour	Stuart Fawcett	147	18.5	−6.2
Green	Mike Turner	72	9.0	+9.0
Majority		247	31.0	
Turnout		796		
Conservative hold		Swing		

The by-election was held following the death of Conservative councillor Bob Adams in November 2021; he had represented the ward since 2007 and served as council leader from 2015 to 2017.

==== Bourne East by-election ====
Bourne East by-election 10 November 2022
Party	Candidate	Votes	%	±%
Conservative	Julia Reid	310	43.5	
Labour	Alex Molyneux	154	21.6	
Independent	Brenda Johnson	120	16.9	
Liberal Democrats	John Ireland	78	10.9	N/A
Green	Rhys Baker	50	7.0	N/A
Majority		156	21.9	
Turnout		714	20.3	−8.1
Conservative hold		Swing		

The by-election was held following the death of Conservative councillor Judy Smith, who had served on the council for almost 20 years.

==== Grantham St Wulfram's by-election ====
Grantham St Wulfram's by-election 10 November 2022
Party	Candidate	Votes	%	±%
Conservative	Mary Whittington	359	39.2	
Independent	Tim Harrison	307	33.6	N/A
Labour	Archie Hine	174	19.0	
Green	Ian Simmons	75	8.2	
Majority		52	5.6	
Turnout		916	22.4	−8.9
Conservative hold		Swing		

The by-election was held after Conservative councillor Jacky Smith resigned.

==== Toller by-election ====
Toller by-election 15 December 2022
Party	Candidate	Votes	%	±%
Liberal Democrats	Murray Turner	256	60.1	N/A
Conservative	Tony Vaughan	170	39.9	−8.6
Majority		86	20.2	
Turnout		432	20.8	−16.5
Liberal Democrats gain from Independent		Swing		

The by-election was held after independent councillor Jan Hansen resigned, citing a culture of "bullying and intimidation" at the council.
