= 2003 South Kesteven District Council election =

2003 UK local government election

Map of the results of the 2003 South Kesteven District Council election. Conservatives in blue, independents in grey, Labour in red and Liberal Democrats in yellow.

The 2003 South Kesteven District Council election took place on 1 May 2003 to elect members of South Kesteven District Council in Lincolnshire, England. The whole council was up for election and the Conservative Party gained control of the council from no overall control.

== Background ==
Before the election the Conservatives had half of the seats on the council with 29 councillors, compared to 14 independents, 12 Labour and 3 Liberal Democrats. The Conservatives ran the council in alliance with the Liberal Democrats, with Linda Neal taking over as leader of the council from Phil Taylor in 2002.

96 candidates stood for the 58 seats on the council over 34 wards, 15 fewer candidates than at the 1999 election. In 11 wards there was no election as the candidates for those seats were elected without opposition. The Conservatives stood 42 candidates, compared to 20 for Labour, 19 independents, 13 Liberal Democrats and 2 candidates for the Green Party.

== Election result ==
The Conservatives gained two seats to take an overall majority on the council with 31 councillors. This came at the expense of the independents and Labour, who both lost two seats to have 12 and 10 councillors respectively. Meanwhile, the Liberal Democrats picked up two seats to have 5 councillors. Overall turnout at the election was 29.65%, around 3% less than in 1999.

The successful candidates included five married couples, Labour's Dorrien and Neil Dexter, Fereshteh and John Hurst and Avril and Mike Williams, as well as Conservatives Margery and Norman Radley and Graham and Mary Wheat. Conservative gains included picking up a seat in Bourne East, but they did lose three seats to the Liberal Democrats in Stamford St John's. In Stamford St George's the second seat for the ward was decided by the toss of a coin and had Conservative Bob Sandall defeat Liberal Democrat Ray Lee.

South Kesteven local election result 2003
Party	Seats	Gains	Losses	Net gain/loss	Seats %	Votes %	Votes	+/−
Conservative	31			+2	53.4	43.9	15,421	
Independent	12			-2	20.7	20.2	7,103	
Labour	10			-2	17.2	19.4	6,813	
Liberal Democrats	5			+2	8.6	15.5	5,438	
Green	0			0	0.0	1.1	373	

== Ward results ==
All Saints (2 seats)
Party	Candidate	Votes	%	±%
Conservative	Terl Bryant	443		
Conservative	Paul Morris	425		
Labour	Mark Ashberry	352		
Labour	Robert Loomes	347		
Turnout		1,567		

Aveland
Party	Candidate	Votes	%	±%
Conservative	Gerald Taylor	unopposed		

Barrowby
Party	Candidate	Votes	%	±%
Conservative	Pamela Bosworth	491	82.9	
Labour	Paul Jacklin	101	17.1	
Majority		390	65.9	
Turnout		592		

Belmont (2 seats)
Party	Candidate	Votes	%	±%
Conservative	George Chivers	441		
Conservative	Nicholas Craft	441		
Liberal Democrats	Jane Carr	288		
Liberal Democrats	Andrew Carr	232		
Green	Helen Cross	174		
Turnout		1,576		

Bourne East (3 seats)
Party	Candidate	Votes	%	±%
Independent	John Kirkman	854		
Conservative	Judith Smith	636		
Conservative	Donald Fisher	569		
Independent	Guy Cudmore	473		
Labour	Derrick Crump	417		
Turnout		2,949		

Bourne West (3 seats)
Party	Candidate	Votes	%	±%
Conservative	Linda Neal	715		
Conservative	John Smith	683		
Conservative	Brian Fines	659		
Labour	Trevor Holmes	573		
Turnout		2,630		

Deeping St James (3 seats)
Party	Candidate	Votes	%	±%
Liberal Democrats	Raymond Auger	797		
Liberal Democrats	Kenneth Joynson	761		
Conservative	Bryan Helyar	683		
Labour	Helen Blades	617		
Turnout		2,858		

Earlesfield (3 seats)
Party	Candidate	Votes	%	±%
Labour	Neil Dexter	356		
Labour	Dorrien Dexter	345		
Labour	Yvonne Gibbins	290		
Conservative	Madge Allen	230		
Liberal Democrats	Simon Finch	143		
Liberal Democrats	Raymond Harding	119		
Turnout		1,483		

Ermine
Party	Candidate	Votes	%	±%
Conservative	Manoharan Nadarajah	unopposed		

Forest
Party	Candidate	Votes	%	±%
Conservative	Paul Carpenter	unopposed		

Glen Eden
Party	Candidate	Votes	%	±%
Independent	Angeline Percival	unopposed		

Grantham St John's (2 seats)
Party	Candidate	Votes	%	±%
Independent	John Wilks	480		
Labour	John Hurst	325		
Conservative	Donald Atkinson	245		
Turnout		1,050		

Green Hill (2 seats)
Party	Candidate	Votes	%	±%
Conservative	Alan Parkin	588		
Conservative	Frank Turner	542		
Labour	Alan Kane	217		
Turnout		1,347		

Greyfriars (2 seats)
Party	Candidate	Votes	%	±%
Conservative	Michael Taylor	443		
Conservative	Joan Stokes	422		
Labour	Erica South	231		
Turnout		1,096		

Harrowby (3 seats)
Party	Candidate	Votes	%	±%
Independent	Stephen Hewerdine	621		
Labour	Michael Williams	462		
Labour	Avril Williams	458		
Labour	Clifford Wells	423		
Independent	Bruce Wells	410		
Conservative	Peter Stephens	382		
Liberal Democrats	Julie Hirst	229		
Liberal Democrats	Martin James	226		
Turnout		3,211		

Heath
Party	Candidate	Votes	%	±%
Conservative	Peter Martin-Mayhew	513	79.8	
Independent	Terence Norman	130	20.2	
Majority		383	59.6	
Turnout		643		

Hillsides
Party	Candidate	Votes	%	±%
Independent	Elizabeth Channell	405	60.7	
Conservative	Thomas Trollope-Bellew	262	39.3	
Majority		143	21.4	
Turnout		667		

Isaac Newton
Party	Candidate	Votes	%	±%
Labour	Ian Selby	326	51.5	
Conservative	William Adams	307	48.5	
Majority		19	3.0	
Turnout		633		

Lincrest
Party	Candidate	Votes	%	±%
Conservative	Norman Radley	unopposed		

Loveden
Party	Candidate	Votes	%	±%
Independent	A.V Kerr	unopposed		

Market and West Deeping (3 seats)
Party	Candidate	Votes	%	±%
Labour	Alan Galbraith	unopposed		
Independent	Reg Howard	unopposed		
Conservative	Stan Pease	unopposed		

Morkery
Party	Candidate	Votes	%	±%
Conservative	Margery Radley	302	53.8	
Independent	Christopher Robinson	259	46.2	
Majority		43	7.7	
Turnout		561		

Peascliffe
Party	Candidate	Votes	%	±%
Independent	Jeffery Thompson	411	68.5	
Conservative	Ian Stokes	189	31.5	
Majority		222	37.0	
Turnout		600		

Ringstone
Party	Candidate	Votes	%	±%
Conservative	Frances Cartwright	unopposed		

Saxonwell
Party	Candidate	Votes	%	±%
Independent	Paul Wood	350	55.2	
Conservative	Nigel Parker	284	44.8	
Majority		66	10.4	
Turnout		634		

Stamford St. John's (3 seats)
Party	Candidate	Votes	%	±%
Liberal Democrats	Doarkanathsing Bisnauthsing	714		
Liberal Democrats	Maureen Jalili	618		
Liberal Democrats	Stephen O'Hare	574		
Conservative	Michael Exton	561		
Conservative	David Nalson	544		
Conservative	Brian Sumner	475		
Turnout		3,486		
Liberal Democrats gain from Conservative		Swing		
Liberal Democrats gain from Conservative		Swing		
Liberal Democrats gain from Conservative		Swing		

St. Anne's (2 seats)
Party	Candidate	Votes	%	±%
Independent	Charles Burrows	468		
Labour	Fereshteh Hurst	296		
Conservative	Janice Clough	281		
Independent	Harry Thomas	217		
Green	Margaret Gregory	199		
Turnout		1,461		

St George's (2 seats)
Party	Candidate	Votes	%	±%
Labour	Joyce Gaffigan	370		
Conservative	Percival Sandall	340		
Liberal Democrats	Raymond Lee	339		
Labour	Robina Hill	307		
Turnout		1,356		

St. Mary's (2 seats)
Party	Candidate	Votes	%	±%
Conservative	Robert Conboy	666		
Conservative	Azar Woods	486		
Independent	Cedric Cadman	321		
Turnout		1,473		

St. Wulfram's (2 seats)
Party	Candidate	Votes	%	±%
Conservative	Herbert Wheat	614		
Conservative	Mary Wheat	559		
Liberal Democrats	Judith Smith	398		
Turnout		1,571		

Thurlby
Party	Candidate	Votes	%	±%
Conservative	John Nicholson	unopposed		

Toller
Party	Candidate	Votes	%	±%
Conservative	Reg Lovelock	unopposed		

Truesdale (2 seats)
Party	Candidate	Votes	%	±%
Independent	Paul Genever	649		
Independent	George Waterhouse	541		
Independent	Thomas Butterfield	514		
Turnout		1,704		

Witham Valley
Party	Candidate	Votes	%	±%
Conservative	Rosemary Kaberry-Brown	unopposed		

== By-elections between 2003 and 2007 ==
=== Greyfriars ===
Greyfriars by-election 21 October 2004
Party	Candidate	Votes	%	±%
Conservative	Ian Stokes	166	47.6	−18.1
Labour		98	28.1	−6.2
Liberal Democrats		85	24.4	+24.4
Majority		68	19.5	
Turnout		349	12	
Conservative hold		Swing		

=== All Saints ===
All Saints by-election 1 September 2005
Party	Candidate	Votes	%	±%
Conservative		271	40.8	−14.9
Labour		193	29.0	−15.3
Liberal Democrats		186	28.0	+28.0
Independent		14	2.1	+2.1
Majority		78	11.7	
Turnout		664	19.0	
Conservative hold		Swing		

=== Earlesfield ===
Earlesfield by-election 1 September 2005
Party	Candidate	Votes	%	±%
Labour		219	62.2	+13.4
Conservative		133	37.8	+6.2
Majority		86	24.4	
Turnout		352	8.2	
Labour hold		Swing		

=== St Anne's ===
Labour won a by-election in St Anne's ward after the death of councillor Fred Burrows. Labour candidate Lee Steptoe was unopposed after the Conservative candidates papers were found to be invalid, while the Liberal Democrats were unable to find the required 10 seconders.

St Anne's by-election 27 October 2005
Party	Candidate	Votes	%	±%
Labour	Lee Steptoe	unopposed		
Labour gain from Independent		Swing		

=== Market and West Deeping ===
Market and West Deeping by-election 9 March 2006
Party	Candidate	Votes	%	±%
Conservative	Michael Exton	unopposed		
Conservative gain from Labour		Swing		

=== Truesdale ===
Truesdale by-election 18 May 2006
Party	Candidate	Votes	%	±%
Conservative	Thomas Webster	416	42.2	
Liberal Democrats		232	23.6	
Independent		171	17.4	
Independent		166	16.9	
Majority		184	18.7	
Turnout		985	27.7	
Conservative gain from Independent		Swing		
