= 2023 South Kesteven District Council election =

2023 English local election

- 4 May 2023

All 56 seats on South Kesteven District Council 29 seats needed for a majority

	First party	Second party	Third party
Leader	Kelham Cooke
Party	Conservative	Independent	Green
Last election	40 seats, 53.3%	11 seats, 19.2%	0 seats, 3.8%
Seats before	38 (Note: Including one vacant seat in Peascliffe and Ridgeway ward previously held by Conservative councillor Rosemary Kaberry-Brown until her resignation in November 2022.)	13 (Note: Of the thirteen independent councillors before the election, four sat with the Liberal Democrats as the "Democratic Independents" group led by independent Philip Knowles, three formed the "Alliance South Kesteven" group led by Ashley Baxter, three formed the "Independent Group" led by Paul Wood and the other three did not form part of a group.)	0
Seats after	24	22	4
Seat change	▼16	▲11	▲4
Popular vote	10,450	12,527	3,906
Percentage	30.0%	36.0%	11.2%
Swing	▼23.3%	▲16.8%	▲7.4%
	Fourth party	Fifth party
Party	Liberal Democrats	Labour
Last election	2 seats, 3.3%	3 seats, 18.5%
Seats before	3	2
Seats after	4	2
Seat change	▲2	▼1
Popular vote	2,844	4,528
Percentage	8.2%	13.0%
Swing	▲4.9%	▲7.4%
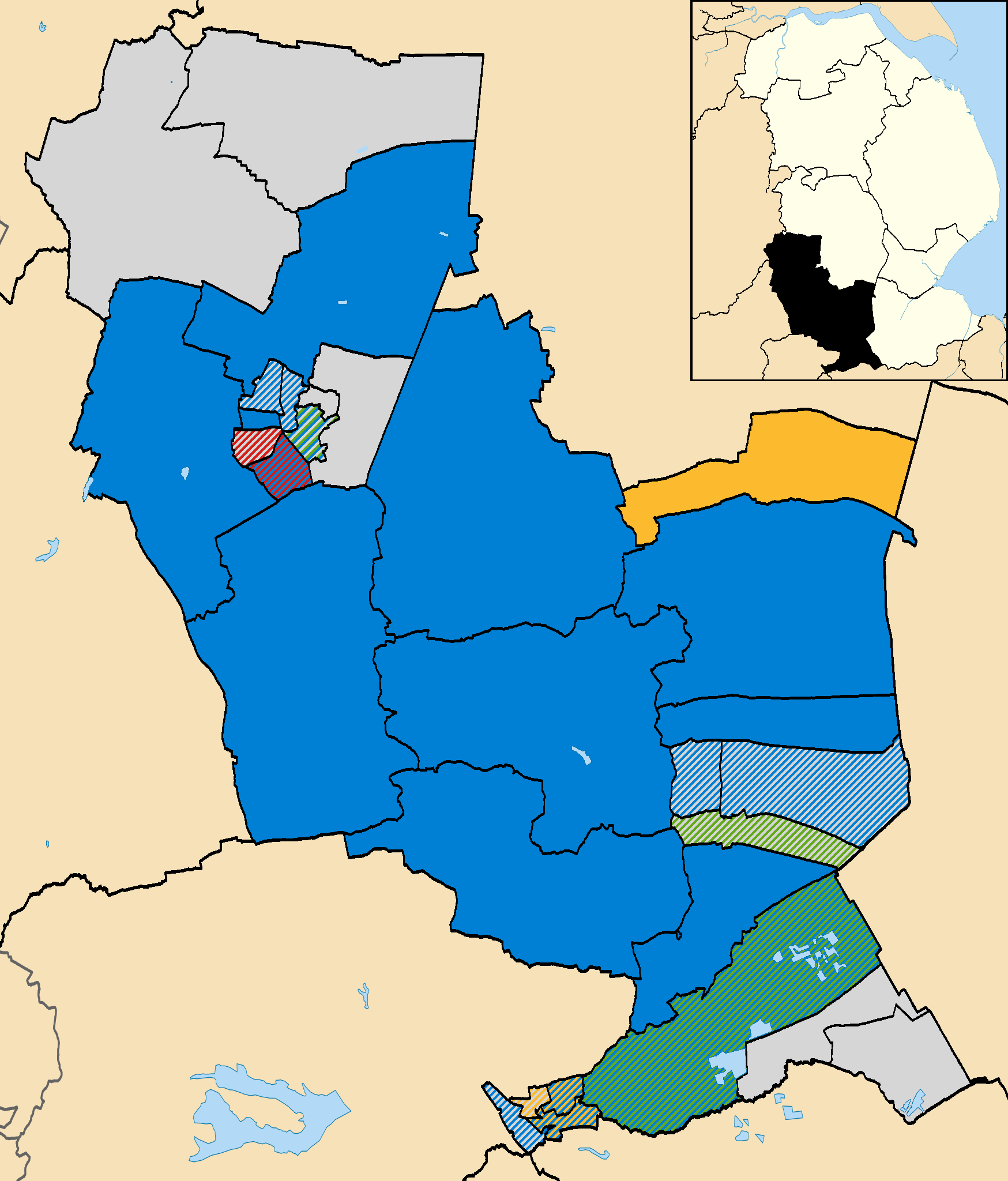
- Map of the results of the 2023 South Kesteven District Council election. Conservatives in blue, Liberal Democrats in orange, Labour in red, Green Party in green, and independents in grey.
Leader before election
Kelham Cooke
Conservative
Leader after election
Richard Cleaver
Independent
No overall control

The 2023 South Kesteven District Council election took place on 4 May 2023 to elect all 56 members of South Kesteven District Council in Lincolnshire, England. This was on the same day as other local elections across England.

The council was under Conservative majority control prior to the election. The Conservatives remained the largest party after the election but lost their majority. Both the Conservative leader, Kelham Cooke, and deputy leader, Adam Stokes, lost their seats.

A coalition of some of the independent councillors and the Greens, Liberal Democrats and Labour formed to take control of the council, narrowly beating a rival coalition of the Conservatives and some of the other independents to form an administration by one vote at the council's subsequent annual meeting on 18 May 2023. Independent councillor Richard Cleaver therefore became leader of the council, defeating the new Conservative leader, Graham Jeal.

== Results summary ==
The overall results were as follows:

South Kesteven District Council election result 2023
Party	Seats	Gains	Losses	Net gain/loss	Seats %	Votes %	Votes	+/−
Independent	22	12	1	+11	39.3	36.0	12,527	+10.4
Conservative	24	0	16	-16	42.9	30.0	10,450	-23.3
Labour	2	1	2	-1	3.6	13.0	4,528	+7.4
Green	4	4	0	+4	7.1	11.2	3,906	+7.4
Liberal Democrats	4	2	0	+2	7.1	8.2	2,844	+4.9
Reform	0	0	0	0	0.0	1.1	371	N/A
Lincolnshire Independent	0	0	0	0	0.0	0.6	192	N/A
SDP	0	0	0	0	0.0	0.0	17	N/A

Four seats were elected unopposed, all of which were taken by Conservatives.

== Ward results ==
The results for each ward were as follows, with an asterisk (*) indicating an incumbent councillor standing for re-election.

=== Aveland ===
Aveland
Party	Candidate	Votes	%	±%
Conservative	Richard Adrian Dixon-Warren*	457	58.6	+58.6
Liberal Democrats	James Robert Brown	210	26.9	N/A
Reform	Michael George Rudkin (Mike Rudkin)	113	14.5	N/A
Turnout		784	39.02	
Registered electors		2,009		
Conservative hold				

=== Belmont ===
Belmont (2 seats)
Party	Candidate	Votes	%	±%
Independent	Philip Alan Gadd (Phil Gadd)	514	54.3	+22.2
Independent	Elvis Stooke	446	47.1	N/A
Conservative	Linda Wootten*	332	35.1	−14.2
Conservative	Dean Anthony William Ward*	275	29.1	−22.1
Labour	Myles Joseph Thomas Sadler	203	21.5	−4.3
Turnout		946	26.99	
Registered electors		3,505		
Independent gain from Conservative				
Independent gain from Conservative				

Dean Ward represented Grantham St Wulfram's ward prior to the election.

=== Belvoir ===
Belvoir (2 seats)
Party	Candidate	Votes	%	±%
Conservative	Pamela Bosworth*	901	61.9	−3.3
Conservative	Robert Ian Leadenham	791	54.4	−7.7
Labour	David Julian Simpson (Julian Simpson)	505	34.7	+8.5
Turnout		1,474	35.75	
Registered electors		4,123		
Conservative hold				
Conservative hold				

=== Bourne Austerby ===
Bourne Austerby (3 seats)
Party	Candidate	Votes	%	±%
Independent	Paul David Fellows*	664	47.6	−5.8
Green	Emma Louise Baker	587	42.1	+11.4
Green	Rhys Rhobat Baker	530	38.0	N/A
Conservative	Robert Philip Harry Reid*	504	36.2	−3.7
Conservative	Christopher Neal (Chris Neal)	454	32.6	−6.8
Green	Ian Paul Simmons	394	28.3	N/A
Turnout		1,402	22.78	
Registered electors		6,154		
Independent hold				
Green gain from Conservative				
Green gain from Conservative				

=== Bourne East ===
Bourne East (2 seats)
Party	Candidate	Votes	%	±%
Independent	Philip James Knowles*	417	42.9	−12.9
Conservative	Zoe Emma Lane	355	36.5	−9.4
Conservative	Julia Ray Reid*	353	36.3	−0.6
Independent	Brenda Maureen Johnson	352	36.2	N/A
Labour	Barnabas Baricz Hughes	214	22.0	+2.7
Turnout		974	28.07	
Registered electors		3,470		
Independent hold				
Conservative hold				

=== Bourne West ===
Bourne West (2 seats)
Party	Candidate	Votes	%	±%
Conservative	Helen Joyce Crawford*	629	50.4	−0.6
Independent	Anna Sylvia Kelly*	600	48.0	−11.2
Liberal Democrats	John Bernard Ireland	579	46.4	N/A
Labour	John Stephen Francis Riley	194	15.5	−4.6
Turnout		1,257	32.21	
Registered electors		3,903		
Conservative hold				
Independent hold				

=== Casewick ===
Casewick (2 seats)
Party	Candidate	Votes	%	±%
Green	Vanessa Mary Smith	1,057	62.8	N/A
Conservative	Rosemary Helen Trollope-Bellew*	709	42.2	−27.9
Conservative	Kelham Harry Cooke*	688	40.9	−34.2
Turnout		1,688	37.49	
Registered electors		4,502		
Green gain from Conservative				
Conservative hold				

=== Castle ===
Castle
Party	Candidate	Votes	%	±%
Conservative	Nick Robins*	unopposed		−47.8
Conservative hold				

=== Deeping St James ===
Deeping St James (3 seats)
Party	Candidate	Votes	%	±%
Independent	Philip Maurice Dilks*	1,470	76.1	+6.8
Independent	Bridget Ann Ley	1,224	63.4	N/A
Independent	James Alexander Denniston	973	50.4	N/A
Independent	Judy Deanne Stevens*	736	38.1	−12.6
Labour	Michael Kenton Horder (Mike Horder)	371	19.2	−5.6
Turnout		1,936	33.95	
Registered electors		5,703		
Independent hold				
Independent gain from Conservative				
Independent gain from Conservative				

Judy Stevens was elected as a Conservative in 2019 but stood as an independent in 2023.

=== Dole Wood ===
Dole Wood
Party	Candidate	Votes	%	±%
Conservative	Barry Martin Dobson*	409	53.7	+53.7
Independent	Nigel Gareth Eveleigh	352	46.3	N/A
Turnout		764	38.78	
Registered electors		1,970		
Conservative hold				

=== Glen ===
Glen
Party	Candidate	Votes	%	±%
Conservative	Penny Robins*	unopposed		−75.0
Conservative hold				

=== Grantham Arnoldfield ===
Grantham Arnoldfield (2 seats)
Party	Candidate	Votes	%	±%
Independent	Paul David Alec Stokes	529	42.9	N/A
Conservative	Paul Michael Martin	449	36.4	−32.0
Conservative	Kathleen-Mary Rice-Oxley* (Kaffy Rice-Oxley)	420	34.1	−29.9
Labour	Thomas Vincent Greenwood (Tom Greenwood)	412	33.4	+9.2
Independent	Michael Detlef Beckett (Mike Beckett)	357	29.0	N/A
Turnout		1,238	29.25	
Registered electors		4,232		
Conservative hold				
Independent gain from Conservative				

=== Grantham Barrowby Gate ===
Grantham Barrowby Gate (2 seats)
Party	Candidate	Votes	%	±%
Conservative	Gareth Lewis Keith Knight	467	40.1	−22.2
Conservative	Mark Anthony Whittington*	445	38.2	−28.1
Labour Co-op	Jonathan Michael Cook	430	36.9	+5.8
Independent	Adrian Mark Smith	343	29.5	N/A
Green	Raymond David Shrouder (Ray Shrouder)	257	22.1	N/A
Independent	John Raymond Parkhill	206	17.7	N/A
Turnout		1,166	30.11	
Registered electors		3,872		
Conservative hold				
Conservative hold				

=== Grantham Earlesfield ===
Grantham Earlesfield (2 seats)
Party	Candidate	Votes	%	±%
Labour	Lee Andrew Steptoe*	305	51.9	+12.3
Independent	Steven Cunnington	301	51.2	N/A
Labour	Carole Anne Thomson (Caz Thomson)	218	37.1	−11.6
Independent	Bruce Wells	214	36.4	+2.3
Turnout		591	14.93	
Registered electors		3,959		
Labour hold				
Independent gain from Labour				

=== Grantham Harrowby ===
Grantham Harrowby (2 seats)
Party	Candidate	Votes	%	±%
Independent	Ian Edward Selby*	526	60.5	−7.9
Independent	Christopher Thomas Noon (Chris Noon)	468	53.8	N/A
Labour	David Aaron Burling	259	29.8	+10.6
Conservative	Clio Lyndon Perraton-Williams	187	21.5	+0.1
Turnout		872	24.09	
Registered electors		3,620		
Independent hold				
Independent gain from Conservative				

=== Grantham Springfield ===
Grantham Springfield (2 seats)
Party	Candidate	Votes	%	±%
Labour	Robert Murray Shorrock (Rob Shorrock)	364	41.8	+0.2
Conservative	Nicola Anne Manterfield* (Nikki Manterfield)	301	34.6	−16.3
Conservative	Adam Neil Stokes*	295	33.9	−16.8
Independent	Matthew William Ash	277	31.8	N/A
Green	John Chadwick	210	24.1	N/A
Turnout		874	23.01	
Registered electors		3,799		
Labour gain from Conservative				
Conservative hold				

=== Grantham St Vincent's ===
Grantham St Vincent's (3 seats)
Party	Candidate	Votes	%	±%
Green	Patricia Ellis (Patsy Ellis)	520	35.8	+6.1
Independent	Charmaine Dawn Morgan*	517	35.6	−9.1
Conservative	Graham Frank Jeal*	400	27.5	−10.7
Labour	Tracey Ann Forman	393	27.0	−8.0
Green	Anne Elizabeth Gayfer	375	25.8	+2.6
Green	Alex James Ferguson	372	25.6	N/A
Labour	Janeile Eardley	365	25.1	−5.8
Conservative	Brian Rodney Monro	344	23.7	−11.7
Independent	John George Morgan	328	22.6	−8.3
Independent	Gary Wayne Rudd	324	22.3	N/A
Turnout		1,458	28.07	
Registered electors		5,194		
Green gain from Conservative				
Independent gain from Labour				
Conservative hold				

Charmaine Morgan had been elected as a Labour councillor in 2019 but left the party to sit as an independent in 2022. Seat shown as independent gain from Labour to allow comparison with 2019 result.

=== Grantham St Wulfram's ===
Grantham St Wulfram's (2 seats)
Party	Candidate	Votes	%	±%
Independent	Timothy James Harrison (Tim Harrison)	588	44.9	N/A
Conservative	Raymond Wootten* (Ray Wootten)	523	39.9	−17.8
Independent	Susan Elizabeth Swinburn	471	35.9	N/A
Conservative	Mary June Whittington*	390	29.7	−20.7
Labour	Beverley Sarah Jones	321	24.5	+8.1
Turnout		1,312	32.37	
Registered electors		4,053		
Independent gain from Conservative				
Conservative hold				

=== Isaac Newton ===
Isaac Newton (2 seats)
Party	Candidate	Votes	%	±%
Conservative	David Michael Bellamy*	576	59.5	−4.6
Conservative	Benjamin Samuel Oliver Green* (Ben Green)	512	52.9	−16.9
Labour	Archie George Hine	281	29.0	+6.1
Green	Michael James Turner (Mike Turner)	277	28.6	N/A
Turnout		980	26.34	
Registered electors		3,721		
Conservative hold				
Conservative hold				

=== Lincrest ===
Lincrest
Party	Candidate	Votes	%	±%
Conservative	Sarah Joan Trotter*	unopposed		−73.8
Conservative hold				

=== Loveden Heath ===
Loveden Heath
Party	Candidate	Votes	%	±%
Independent	Penelope Milnes* (Penny Milnes)	539	63.6	+12.0
Conservative	Judith Rebecca Sharman	309	36.4	+16.7
Turnout		854	40.69	
Registered electors		2,099		
Independent hold				

=== Market and West Deeping ===
Market and West Deeping (3 seats)
Party	Candidate	Votes	%	±%
Independent	Ashley John Baxter*	1,255	71.9	+9.1
Independent	Virginia Elizabeth Moran*	934	53.5	+10.7
Independent	Pamela Pauline Byrd (Pam Byrd)	803	46.0	N/A
Independent	Robert John Broughton* (Bob Broughton)	751	43.0	−0.2
Independent	Martin Reilly	563	32.2	N/A
Independent	Xanthe Judith Collins (Xan Collins)	244	14.0	N/A
Turnout		1,755	32.10	
Registered electors		5,468		
Independent hold				
Independent hold				
Independent gain from Conservative				

Bob Broughton had been elected in 2019 as a Conservative but stood in 2023 as an independent.

=== Morton ===
Morton
Party	Candidate	Votes	%	±%
Conservative	Sue Woolley*	unopposed		−73.9
Conservative hold				

=== Peascliffe and Ridgeway ===
Peascliffe and Ridgeway (2 seats)
Party	Candidate	Votes	%	±%
Conservative	Ian Stokes*	561	46.4	−7.4
Conservative	Peter Francis Howard Stephens	497	41.1	−15.3
Independent	Nicholas Stewart Johnson (Nick Johnson)	306	25.3	N/A
Labour	Keith Richard White	276	22.8	+8.1
Green	John Hadden Millar	254	21.0	−9.7
Independent	Verena Ridgley (Vee Ridgley)	175	14.5	N/A
Turnout		1,213	30.25	
Registered electors		4,010		
Conservative hold				
Conservative hold				

=== Stamford All Saints ===
Stamford All Saints (2 seats)
Party	Candidate	Votes	%	±%
Liberal Democrats	Habibur Rahman (Habib Rahman)	550	51.7	N/A
Independent	Maxwell Graham Sawyer (Max Sawyer)	467	43.9	N/A
Conservative	Breda-Rae Griffin*	375	35.2	−24.9
Conservative	Nicola Sandall	335	31.5	−25.5
Turnout		1,071	28.08	
Registered electors		3,814		
Liberal Democrats gain from Conservative				
Independent gain from Conservative				

Seat change compared to 2019 election; one of the seats had been won by an independent at a by-election in 2021.

=== Stamford St George's ===
Stamford St George's (2 seats)
Party	Candidate	Votes	%	±%
Liberal Democrats	Rhea Natasha Rayside	548	56.6	+17.5
Conservative	Gloria Johnson*	424	43.8	+4.7
Reform	Angela Michelle Carter-Begbie	202	20.9	N/A
Turnout		992	26.60	
Registered electors		3,729		
Liberal Democrats hold				
Conservative hold				

=== Stamford St John's ===
Stamford St John's (2 seats)
Party	Candidate	Votes	%	±%
Independent	Richard James Cleaver*	1,041	79.7	N/A
Conservative	Susan Jennifer Sandall*	375	28.7	−21.5
Conservative	Percival William Robert Sandall (Robert Sandall)	353	27.0	−23.2
Turnout		1,317	30.72	
Registered electors		4,287		
Independent gain from Conservative				
Conservative hold				

Richard Cleaver represented Stamford All Saints prior to the election.

=== Stamford St Mary's ===
Stamford St Mary's
Party	Candidate	Votes	%	±%
Liberal Democrats	Doarkanathsing Harrish Bisnauthsing* (Harrish Bisnauthsing)	701	59.0	+8.3
Conservative	Jane Kingman*	441	37.1	−12.9
Independent	Julie Clarke	414	34.8	N/A
Green	Judith Carol Clarke (Judi Clarke)	350	29.5	N/A
Turnout		1,201	32.64	
Registered electors		3,679		
Liberal Democrats hold				
Conservative hold				

Seat change compared to 2019 election; the Conservative elected in 2019, Matthew Lee, had left the party in 2022 and sat the remainder of his term as an independent. He did not stand for re-election. Jane Kingman had represented Bourne Austerby prior to the election.

=== Toller ===
Toller
Party	Candidate	Votes	%	±%
Liberal Democrats	Murray Frank Turner*	256	36.5	N/A
Lincolnshire Independent	Christopher Clark (Chris Clark)	192	27.4	N/A
Conservative	Anthony Philip Vaughan (Tony Vaughan)	181	25.8	−22.7
Reform	Amanda Gackowska (Amanda Gee)	56	8.0	N/A
SDP	Alexander Leslie Mitchell	17	2.4	N/A
Turnout		706	33.91	
Registered electors		2,082		
Liberal Democrats gain from Independent				

Seat change compared to 2019 election; Murray Turner had won the seat at a by-election in December 2022.

=== Viking ===
Viking (2 seats)
Party	Candidate	Votes	%	±%
Independent	Paul Wood*	1,055	70.5	+6.7
Independent	Jane Wood*	937	62.6	+9.1
Conservative	Claire Margaret Storer	585	39.1	+11.8
Turnout		1,507	37.00	
Registered electors		4,073		
Independent hold				
Independent hold				

== Changes 2023–2027 ==
- 28 February 2025: Rosemary Trollope-Bellew (Conservative, Casewick) joined Reform UK.
- 11 March 2025: Trollope-Bellew left Reform UK to sit as an independent, after the party said she had not been authorised to represent it.
- 17 July 2025: Graham Jeal (St Vincent's), Ben Green and David Bellamy (both Isaac Newton) left the Conservatives to join Reform UK, forming the council's first Reform UK group.
- 7 October 2025: Mark Whittington (Conservative, Grantham Barrowby Gate) left the Conservatives to join Reform UK.
- 28 October 2025: Whittington left Reform UK to sit as an independent, citing personal reasons related to his health.

=== By-elections ===
==== Grantham St Wulfram's ====
Grantham St Wulfram's by-election, 9 November 2023
Party	Candidate	Votes	%	±%
Conservative	Matthew Robert Bailey	361	33.7	
Independent	Susan Elizabeth Swinburn	233	21.8	
Labour Co-op	Jonathan Michael Cook	173	16.2	
Green	Anne Elizabeth Gayfer	145	13.5	
Liberal Democrats	James Antony Osborn	135	12.6	
Independent	Dean Anthony William Ward	24	2.2	
Turnout		1,084	26.7	
Registered electors		4,057		
Conservative hold				

This by-election was triggered by the death of Conservative councillor Ray Wootten.

==== Aveland ====
Aveland by-election: 11 December 2025
Party	Candidate	Votes	%	±%
Reform	Kyle Abel	290	41.0	+26.5
Conservative	Tony Vaughan	280	39.5	−19.1
Green	Brynley Heaven	115	16.2	N/A
Labour	David Burling	23	3.2	N/A
Turnout		708	35.65	−3.37
Registered electors		1,986		
Reform gain from Conservative		Swing		

The by-election was held after Conservative councillor Richard Dixon-Warren resigned, citing a wish to spend more time with his family and his work with charities and local organisations.

==== Belmont ====
Belmont by-election: 11 December 2025
Party	Candidate	Votes	%	±%
Reform	Richard Litchfield	239	33.4	N/A
Conservative	Adam Stokes	237	33.1	−2.0
Independent	Declan Gibbons	143	20.0	N/A
Green	Sean Hothersall	61	8.5	N/A
Labour	Susan Nash	35	4.9	−16.6
Turnout		715	20.85	−6.14
Registered electors		3,430		
Reform gain from Independent		Swing		

The by-election was held after independent councillor Philip Gadd resigned; he did not respond to a request for comment on his reasons for standing down.

==== Grantham St Wulfram's ====
Grantham St Wulfram's by-election, 22 October 2026 Resignation of Tim Harrison (Independent)
Party	Candidate	Votes	%	±%
Conservative	Ben Lavender	437	38.3	+1.8
Reform	Andy McKinlay	286	25.1	N/A
Independent	Marie Reid	149	13.1	N/A
Labour	Tim Galsworthy	141	12.4	−10.0
Green	Ian Simmons	74	6.5	N/A
Independent	Wayne Hasnip	54	4.7	N/A
Majority		151	13.2	N/A
Turnout		1,143	28.5	−4.1
Registered electors		4,015		
Conservative gain from Independent				
