= 2011 South Kesteven District Council election =

2011 UK local government election

Map of the results of the 2011 South Kesteven District Council election. Conservatives in blue, independents in grey, Labour in red, Liberal Democrats in yellow and Lincolnshire Independents in black.

The 2011 South Kesteven District Council election took place on 5 May 2011 to elect members of South Kesteven District Council in Lincolnshire, England. The whole council was up for election and the Conservative Party stayed in overall control of the council.

== Election result ==
The Conservatives remained in control of the council after gaining seats from the Liberal Democrats. These gains included taking all three seats in St Johns ward, as well as a seat each in All Saints and St Georges wards. Labour also made gains to move to six councillors, while the number of independents dropped.

The election in Deeping St James was delayed from the original date after the death of a Liberal Democrat councillor for the ward.

South Kesteven local election result 2011
Party	Seats	Gains	Losses	Net gain/loss	Seats %	Votes %	Votes	+/−
Conservative	38	6	2	+4	65.5	48.9	30,584	+5.3
Independent	12	3	7	-4	20.7	24.6	15,363	-4.0
Labour	6	4	0	+4	10.3	12.6	7,858	+0.8
Liberal Democrats	1	1	6	-5	1.7	5.7	3,578	-7.7
Lincolnshire Independent	1	1	0	+1	1.7	1.3	830	+1.3
Green	0	0	0	0	0.0	6.2	3,872	+4.8
UKIP	0	0	0	0	0.0	0.7	435	-0.2

The above totals include the delayed election in Deeping St. James.

== Ward results ==
All Saints (2 seats)
Party	Candidate	Votes	%	±%
Conservative	Breda-Rae Griffin	480		
Independent	Susan Sandall	452		
Independent	Maxwell Sawyer	413		
Labour	David Bimson	318		
Liberal Democrats	Ismail Jalili	271		
Labour	Adam Wissen	247		
Turnout		2,181		
Conservative gain from Liberal Democrats		Swing		
Independent hold		Swing		

Aveland
Party	Candidate	Votes	%	±%
Conservative	Debbie Wren	624	72.1	
Liberal Democrats	Peter Morris	241	27.9	
Majority		383	44.3	
Turnout		865		
Conservative hold		Swing		

Barrowby
Party	Candidate	Votes	%	±%
Conservative	Pamela Bosworth	424	51.6	
Independent	Lynda Coutts	397	48.4	
Majority		27	3.3	
Turnout		821		
Conservative hold		Swing		

Belmont (2 seats)
Party	Candidate	Votes	%	±%
Conservative	George Chivers	727		
Conservative	Nicholas Craft	705		
Labour	Michael Burton	415		
Labour	Deborah Grinnell	407		
Liberal Democrats	Martin James	211		
Turnout		2,465		
Conservative hold		Swing		
Conservative hold		Swing		

Bourne East (3 seats)
Party	Candidate	Votes	%	±%
Conservative	Judith Smith	1,416		
Conservative	David Higgs	1,179		
Conservative	Robert Russell	1,148		
Green	David Evans	776		
Turnout		4,519		
Conservative hold		Swing		
Conservative hold		Swing		
Conservative hold		Swing		

Bourne West (3 seats)
Party	Candidate	Votes	%	±%
Conservative	Linda Neal	1,018		
Conservative	John Smith	858		
Lincolnshire Independent	Helen Powell	830		
Conservative	Kirsty Roche	795		
Independent	Trevor Holmes	729		
Labour	Jonathan Hitch	440		
Turnout		4,670		
Conservative hold		Swing		
Conservative hold		Swing		
Lincolnshire Independent gain from Independent		Swing		

Earlesfield (3 seats)
Party	Candidate	Votes	%	±%
Labour	Alan Davidson	351		
Independent	David Kerr	232		
Labour	Robert Shorrock	217		
Conservative	Richard Davies	162		
Independent	Stuart McBride	162		
Independent	Alwyn Todd	161		
Conservative	Paul Manterfield	119		
Conservative	Umar Nadine	50		
Turnout		1,454		
Labour hold		Swing		
Independent hold		Swing		
Labour gain from Independent		Swing		

Ermine
Party	Candidate	Votes	%	±%
Conservative	Trevor Scott	601	59.4	
Independent	Christina Lees	410	40.6	
Majority		191	18.9	
Turnout		1,011		
Conservative hold		Swing		

Forest
Party	Candidate	Votes	%	±%
Conservative	Paul Carpenter	unopposed		
Conservative hold		Swing		

Glen Eden
Party	Candidate	Votes	%	±%
Conservative	Nicholas Robins	unopposed		
Conservative hold		Swing		

Grantham St. John's (2 seats)
Party	Candidate	Votes	%	±%
Conservative	Adam Stokes	530		
Conservative	Jean Taylor	512		
Labour	Mark Bartlett	479		
Labour	David Burling	458		
Independent	Elisabeth Simpson	321		
Turnout		2,300		
Conservative gain from Independent		Swing		
Conservative hold		Swing		

Green Hill (2 seats)
Party	Candidate	Votes	%	±%
Conservative	Alan Parkin	668		
Conservative	Frank Turner	658		
Independent	Ian Mihill	645		
Independent	Geoffrey Wildman	466		
Turnout		2,437		
Conservative hold		Swing		
Conservative hold		Swing		

Greyfriars (2 seats)
Party	Candidate	Votes	%	±%
Conservative	Michael Taylor	549		
Conservative	Ian Stokes	456		
Independent	John Andrews	305		
Labour	Yvonne Gibbins	268		
Independent	Alfred Kent	246		
Labour	Susan Duerdoth	194		
Turnout		2,018		
Conservative hold		Swing		
Conservative hold		Swing		

Harrowby (3 seats)
Party	Candidate	Votes	%	±%
Labour	Ian Selby	730		
Labour	Bruce Wells	644		
Labour	Mark Ashberry	584		
Conservative	Lee Bruce	579		
Conservative	Linda Wootten	561		
Conservative	Graham Jeal	510		
Independent	Michael Williams	395		
Turnout		4,003		
Labour hold		Swing		
Labour gain from Independent		Swing		
Labour gain from Independent		Swing		

Heath
Party	Candidate	Votes	%	±%
Independent	Robert Sampson	384	45.3	
Conservative	Peter Martin-Mahew	314	37.1	
Independent	Peter Sandy	149	17.6	
Majority		70	8.3	
Turnout		847		
Independent gain from Conservative		Swing		

Hillsides
Party	Candidate	Votes	%	±%
Independent	Elizabeth Channell	568	60.0	+1.4
Conservative	Thomas Trollope-Bellew	379	40.0	−1.4
Majority		189	20.0	+2.8
Turnout		947		
Independent hold		Swing		

Isaac Newton
Party	Candidate	Votes	%	±%
Conservative	William Adams	unopposed		
Conservative hold		Swing		

Lincrest
Party	Candidate	Votes	%	±%
Conservative	Peter Stephens	unopposed		
Conservative hold		Swing		

Loveden
Party	Candidate	Votes	%	±%
Independent	Albert Kerr	unopposed		
Independent hold		Swing		

Market and West Deeping (3 seats)
Party	Candidate	Votes	%	±%
Conservative	Paul Cosham	959		
Independent	Robert Broughton	847		
Independent	Reginald Howard	844		
Conservative	Michael Exton	766		
Green	Ashley Baxter	622		
Independent	Jessica Fraylich	533		
Green	John Scholfield	330		
Green	William Booker	302		
Turnout		5,203		
Conservative hold		Swing		
Independent hold		Swing		
Independent hold		Swing		

Morkey
Party	Candidate	Votes	%	±%
Conservative	Martin Wilkins	unopposed		
Conservative hold		Swing		

Peascliffe
Party	Candidate	Votes	%	±%
Independent	Jeffrey Thompson	unopposed		
Independent hold		Swing		

Ringstone
Party	Candidate	Votes	%	±%
Conservative	Frances Cartwright	590	62.1	
Green	Alexandra King	188	19.8	
Liberal Democrats	Janire Morris	172	18.1	
Majority		402	42.3	
Turnout		950		
Conservative hold		Swing		

Saxonwell
Party	Candidate	Votes	%	±%
Independent	Paul Wood	721	70.0	
Conservative	Mamoharan Nadarajah	309	30.0	
Majority		412	40.0	
Turnout		1,030		
Independent hold		Swing		

St. Anne's (2 seats)
Party	Candidate	Votes	%	±%
Conservative	Michael Cook	431		
Labour	Charmaine Morgan	396		
Labour	John Morgan	370		
Independent	Dale Wright	352		
Conservative	Nicola Manterfield	320		
Independent	Robert Hearmon	245		
Independent	Walter Kirk	201		
Turnout		2,315		
Conservative hold		Swing		
Labour gain from Independent		Swing		

St. George's (2 seats)
Party	Candidate	Votes	%	±%
Independent	Percival Sandall	426		
Conservative	Brenda Sumner	409		
Labour	Sandra Curran	322		
Labour	William Turner	319		
Independent	Maxine Couch	306		
Liberal Democrats	Joyce Gaffigan	272		
Green	Richard Rae	142		
Turnout		2,196		
Independent hold		Swing		
Conservative gain from Liberal Democrats		Swing		

St. Mary's (2 seats)
Party	Candidate	Votes	%	±%
Conservative	Elizabeth Bevan	676		
Liberal Democrats	Doarkanathsing Bisnauthsing	606		
Independent	John Dawson	516		
Conservative	Brian Sumner	515		
Green	Martin Bamford	294		
Independent	Jonathan Poznanski	281		
Turnout		2,888		
Conservative hold		Swing		
Liberal Democrats gain from Independent		Swing		

St. Wulfram's (2 seats)
Party	Candidate	Votes	%	±%
Conservative	Raymond Wootten	837		
Conservative	Jacqueline Wootten	772		
Labour	Paul Jacklin	404		
Labour	Eric Goodyer	295		
Liberal Democrats	Jane Sharp	238		
Turnout		2,546		
Conservative hold		Swing		
Conservative hold		Swing		

Stamford St. John's (3 seats)
Party	Candidate	Votes	%	±%
Conservative	David Nalson	1,232		
Conservative	Terl Bryant	1,103		
Conservative	Graddon Rowlands	1,014		
Independent	Clement Walden	639		
Independent	Anthony Story	600		
Liberal Democrats	Maureen Jalili	551		
Liberal Democrats	Christine Brough	485		
UKIP	Robert Foulkes	435		
Turnout		6,059		
Conservative gain from Liberal Democrats		Swing		
Conservative gain from Liberal Democrats		Swing		
Conservative gain from Liberal Democrats		Swing		

Thurlby
Party	Candidate	Votes	%	±%
Conservative	John Nicholson	unopposed		
Conservative hold		Swing		

Toller
Party	Candidate	Votes	%	±%
Conservative	Michael King	629	66.1	
Green	Susan Towers	170	17.9	
Liberal Democrats	Brian Withnall	152	16.0	
Majority		459	48.3	
Turnout		951		
Conservative hold		Swing		

Truesdale (2 seats)
Party	Candidate	Votes	%	±%
Conservative	Rosemary Woolley	1,066		
Conservative	Kelham Cooke	914		
Independent	Thomas Butterfield	462		
Green	Rose Booker	409		
Turnout		2,851		
Conservative hold		Swing		
Conservative hold		Swing		

Witham Valley
Party	Candidate	Votes	%	±%
Conservative	Rosemary Kaberry-Brown	588	53.3	
Independent	Jane Wood	516	46.7	
Majority		72	6.5	
Turnout		1,104		
Conservative hold		Swing		

=== Deeping St James delayed election ===
The election in Deeping St James was delayed until 23 June 2011 after the death of the Liberal Democrat councillor for the ward since 1983, Ken Joynson. The Conservatives and Liberal Democrats both lost a seat, at the election, with the Conservative retaining one of the three seats. The other two seats were won by an independent and by Phil Dilks, a former Labour county councillor who stood with no party description.

Deeping St. James (3 seats)
Party	Candidate	Votes	%	±%
Independent	Philip Dilks	792		
Independent	Judy Stevens	647		
Conservative	Raymond Auger	631		
Conservative	Robert Thomas	483		
Green	Ashley Baxter	350		
Conservative	Michael Exton	318		
Green	Michael Bossingham	289		
Liberal Democrats	Philip Hammersley	242		
Liberal Democrats	Janire Morris	70		
Liberal Democrats	Peter Morris	67		
Turnout		3,889		
Independent gain from Liberal Democrats		Swing		
Independent gain from Conservative		Swing		
Conservative hold		Swing		

== By-elections between 2011 and 2015 ==
A by-election was held in Aveland on 13 March 2014 after the resignation of Conservative councillor Debbie Wren. The seat was held for the Conservatives by Peter Moseley with a majority of 243 votes over Labour candidate John Morgan.

Aveland by-election 13 March 2014
Party	Candidate	Votes	%	±%
Conservative	Peter Moseley	359	75.6	+3.5
Labour	John Morgan	116	24.4	+24.4
Majority		243	51.2	+6.9
Turnout		475	26.2	
Conservative hold		Swing		
