= 1999 South Kesteven District Council election =

1999 UK local government election

The 1999 South Kesteven District Council election took place on 6 May 1999 to elect members of South Kesteven District Council in Lincolnshire, England. The whole council was up for election with boundary changes since the last election in 1995. The council stayed under no overall control.

== Election result ==
South Kesteven local election result 1999
Party	Seats	Gains	Losses	Net gain/loss	Seats %	Votes %	Votes	+/−
Conservative	29			+13	50.0			
Independent	13			-4	22.4			
Labour	12			-3	20.7			
Liberal Democrats	3			-4	5.2			
Others	1			+1	1.7			
Liberal	0			-2	0			

== By-elections between 1999 and 2003 ==
=== Harrowby ===
Harrowby by-election 24 August 2000
Party	Candidate	Votes	%	±%
Conservative		222	24.7	+7.4
Labour		221	24.6	−3.3
Independent Labour		213	23.7	−1.5
Liberal Democrats		181	20.1	+20.1
Independent		62	6.9	−22.7
Majority		1	0.1	
Turnout		899	19.7	
Conservative gain from Labour		Swing		

=== All Saints ===
All Saints by-election 7 June 2001
Party	Candidate	Votes	%	±%
Labour		1,013	54.8	+5.8
Conservative		837	45.2	−5.8
Majority		176	9.4	
Turnout		1,850		
Labour hold		Swing		

=== St Mary's ===
St Mary's by-election 7 June 2001
Party	Candidate	Votes	%	±%
Conservative		952	45.6	−21.7
Labour		638	30.6	−2.2
Liberal Democrats		498	23.9	+23.9
Majority		314	15.0	
Turnout		2,088		
Conservative hold		Swing		
